= 2024 UEFA Women's Nations League Finals squads =

The following squads were selected by the four teams competing in the 2024 UEFA Women's Nations League Finals.

Each national team had to submit a squad of 23 players, three of whom had to be goalkeepers, at least ten days before the opening match of the tournament. If a player became injured or ill severely enough to prevent her participation in the tournament before her team's first match, she could be replaced by another player.

== France ==
Manager: Hervé Renard

The following 24 players were named in the France squad. On 24 February, Sandy Baltimore withdrew from the team for personal reasons and was replaced by Vicki Bècho.

No.	Pos.	Player	Date of birth (age)	Caps	Goals	Club
1	GK	Solène Durand	20 November 1994 (aged 29)	4	0	(Italian Football Federation) Sassuolo
2	DF	Maëlle Lakrar	27 May 2000 (aged 23)	10	3	(French Football Federation) Montpellier
3	FW	Julie Dufour	29 January 2001 (aged 23)	4	0	(French Football Federation) Paris FC
4	DF	Estelle Cascarino	5 February 1997 (aged 27)	15	1	(Italian Football Federation) Juventus
5	DF	Élisa De Almeida	11 January 1998 (aged 26)	28	3	(French Football Federation) Paris Saint-Germain
6	MF	Amandine Henry	28 September 1989 (aged 34)	98	14	(United States Soccer Federation) Angel City FC
7	DF	Sakina Karchaoui	26 January 1996 (aged 28)	68	0	(French Football Federation) Paris Saint-Germain
8	MF	Grace Geyoro	2 July 1997 (aged 26)	76	17	(French Football Federation) Paris Saint-Germain
9	FW	Eugénie Le Sommer	18 May 1989 (aged 34)	188	93	(French Football Federation) Lyon
10	MF	Amel Majri	25 January 1993 (aged 31)	73	11	(French Football Federation) Lyon
11	FW	Kadidiatou Diani	1 April 1995 (aged 28)	94	26	(French Football Federation) Lyon
12	FW	Clara Matéo	28 November 1997 (aged 26)	29	4	(French Football Federation) Paris FC
13	DF	Selma Bacha	9 November 2000 (aged 23)	26	2	(French Football Federation) Lyon
14	MF	Sandie Toletti	13 July 1995 (aged 28)	50	3	(Royal Spanish Football Federation) Real Madrid
15	MF	Kenza Dali	31 July 1991 (aged 32)	62	12	(The Football Association) Aston Villa
16	GK	Pauline Peyraud-Magnin	17 March 1992 (aged 31)	47	0	(Italian Football Federation) Juventus
17	MF	Léa Le Garrec	9 July 1993 (aged 30)	12	2	(French Football Federation) Fleury
18	FW	Marie-Antoinette Katoto	1 November 1998 (aged 25)	33	27	(French Football Federation) Paris Saint-Germain
19	DF	Griedge Mbock Bathy	26 February 1995 (aged 28)	76	8	(French Football Federation) Lyon
20	FW	Delphine Cascarino	5 February 1997 (aged 27)	56	14	(French Football Federation) Lyon
21	GK	Constance Picaud	5 July 1998 (aged 25)	6	0	(French Football Federation) Paris Saint-Germain
22	DF	Ève Périsset	24 December 1994 (aged 29)	55	4	(The Football Association) Chelsea
23	DF	Thiniba Samoura	11 February 2004 (aged 20)	0	0	(French Football Federation) Paris Saint-Germain
	FW	Vicki Bècho	3 October 2003 (aged 20)	11	1	(French Football Federation) Lyon

== Germany ==
Manager: Horst Hrubesch

No.	Pos.	Player	Date of birth (age)	Caps	Goals	Club
1	GK	Merle Frohms	28 January 1995 (aged 29)	47	0	(German Football Association) VfL Wolfsburg
2	DF	Sarai Linder	26 October 1999 (aged 24)	8	0	(German Football Association) TSG Hoffenheim
3	DF	Kathrin Hendrich	6 April 1992 (aged 31)	67	5	(German Football Association) VfL Wolfsburg
4	DF	Sophia Kleinherne	12 April 2000 (aged 23)	27	1	(German Football Association) Eintracht Frankfurt
5	DF	Marina Hegering	17 April 1990 (aged 33)	34	4	(German Football Association) VfL Wolfsburg
6	MF	Lena Oberdorf	19 December 2001 (aged 22)	44	3	(German Football Association) VfL Wolfsburg
7	FW	Lea Schüller	12 November 1997 (aged 26)	54	35	(German Football Association) Bayern Munich
8	MF	Sydney Lohmann	19 June 2000 (aged 23)	26	4	(German Football Association) Bayern Munich
9	FW	Svenja Huth	25 January 1991 (aged 33)	87	14	(German Football Association) VfL Wolfsburg
10	FW	Laura Freigang	1 February 1998 (aged 26)	24	12	(German Football Association) Eintracht Frankfurt
11	FW	Alexandra Popp (captain)	6 April 1991 (aged 32)	135	67	(German Football Association) VfL Wolfsburg
12	GK	Ann-Katrin Berger	9 October 1990 (aged 33)	8	0	(The Football Association) Chelsea
13	MF	Sara Däbritz	15 February 1995 (aged 29)	103	17	(French Football Federation) Lyon
14	MF	Elisa Senß	10 January 1997 (aged 27)	2	0	(German Football Association) Bayer Leverkusen
15	DF	Giulia Gwinn	2 July 1999 (aged 24)	39	6	(German Football Association) Bayern Munich
16	MF	Linda Dallmann	2 September 1994 (aged 29)	59	12	(German Football Association) Bayern Munich
17	DF	Pia-Sophie Wolter	13 November 1997 (aged 26)	1	0	(German Football Association) Eintracht Frankfurt
18	FW	Vivien Endemann	7 August 2001 (aged 22)	0	0	(German Football Association) VfL Wolfsburg
19	FW	Klara Bühl	7 December 2000 (aged 23)	44	19	(German Football Association) Bayern Munich
20	MF	Sjoeke Nüsken	22 January 2001 (aged 23)	23	2	(The Football Association) Chelsea
21	GK	Stina Johannes	23 January 2000 (aged 24)	0	0	(German Football Association) Eintracht Frankfurt
22	MF	Jule Brand	16 October 2002 (aged 21)	39	7	(German Football Association) VfL Wolfsburg
23	DF	Sara Doorsoun	17 November 1991 (aged 32)	50	1	(German Football Association) Eintracht Frankfurt
	FW	Lena Petermann	5 February 1994 (aged 30)	22	5	(The Football Association) Leicester City

== Netherlands ==
Manager: Andries Jonker

No.	Pos.	Player	Date of birth (age)	Caps	Goals	Club
1	GK	Daphne van Domselaar	6 March 2000 (aged 23)	24	0	(The Football Association) Aston Villa
2	DF	Lynn Wilms	3 October 2000 (aged 23)	39	1	(German Football Association) VfL Wolfsburg
3	DF	Caitlin Dijkstra	30 January 1999 (aged 25)	19	1	(Royal Dutch Football Association) Twente
4	FW	Romée Leuchter	12 January 2001 (aged 23)	12	2	(Royal Dutch Football Association) Ajax
5	DF	Merel van Dongen	11 February 1993 (aged 31)	63	2	(Mexican Football Federation) Monterrey
6	DF	Marisa Olislagers	9 September 2000 (aged 23)	10	0	(Royal Dutch Football Association) Twente
7	FW	Lineth Beerensteyn	11 October 1996 (aged 27)	100	32	(Italian Football Federation) Juventus
8	MF	Sherida Spitse (captain)	29 May 1990 (aged 33)	227	44	(Royal Dutch Football Association) Ajax
9	FW	Chasity Grant	19 April 2001 (aged 22)	0	0	(Royal Dutch Football Association) Ajax
10	MF	Daniëlle van de Donk	5 August 1991 (aged 32)	150	36	(French Football Federation) Lyon
11	FW	Lieke Martens	16 December 1992 (aged 31)	156	61	(French Football Federation) Paris Saint-Germain
12	MF	Jill Baijings	23 February 2001 (aged 23)	8	0	(German Football Association) Bayern Munich
13	FW	Renate Jansen	7 December 1990 (aged 33)	61	5	(Royal Dutch Football Association) Twente
14	MF	Jackie Groenen	17 December 1994 (aged 29)	108	9	(French Football Federation) Paris Saint-Germain
15	FW	Katja Snoeijs	31 August 1996 (aged 27)	24	11	(The Football Association) Everton
16	GK	Lize Kop	17 March 1998 (aged 25)	7	0	(The Football Association) Leicester City
17	FW	Shanice van de Sanden	2 October 1992 (aged 31)	96	21	(The Football Association) Liverpool
18	DF	Kerstin Casparij	23 February 2024 (aged 0)	32	0	(The Football Association) Manchester City
19	MF	Wieke Kaptein	29 August 2005 (aged 18)	5	0	(Royal Dutch Football Association) Twente
20	DF	Dominique Janssen	17 January 1995 (aged 29)	106	6	(German Football Association) VfL Wolfsburg
21	MF	Damaris Egurrola	26 August 1999 (aged 24)	27	5	(French Football Federation) Lyon
22	FW	Esmee Brugts	28 July 2003 (aged 20)	28	8	(Royal Spanish Football Federation) Barcelona
23	GK	Barbara Lorsheyd	26 March 1991 (aged 32)	1	0	(Royal Dutch Football Association) ADO Den Haag

== Spain ==
Manager: Montserrat Tomé

Spain announced a 25-woman squad on 15 February 2024.

No.	Pos.	Player	Date of birth (age)	Caps	Goals	Club
1	GK	María Isabel Rodríguez	23 July 1999 (aged 24)	19	0	(Royal Spanish Football Federation) Real Madrid
2	DF	Ona Batlle	10 June 1999 (aged 24)	42	1	(Royal Spanish Football Federation) Barcelona
3	MF	Teresa Abelleira	9 January 2000 (aged 24)	28	2	(Royal Spanish Football Federation) Real Madrid
4	DF	Irene Paredes (vice-captain)	4 July 1991 (aged 32)	100	11	(Royal Spanish Football Federation) Barcelona
5	DF	María Méndez	10 April 2001 (aged 22)	4	1	(Royal Spanish Football Federation) Levante
6	MF	Aitana Bonmatí (4th captain)	18 January 1998 (aged 26)	60	21	(Royal Spanish Football Federation) Barcelona
7	FW	Salma Paralluelo	13 November 2003 (aged 20)	19	9	(Royal Spanish Football Federation) Barcelona
8	FW	Mariona Caldentey (3rd captain)	19 March 1996 (aged 27)	66	23	(Royal Spanish Football Federation) Barcelona
9	FW	Alba Redondo	27 August 1996 (aged 27)	34	14	(Royal Spanish Football Federation) Levante
10	FW	Jennifer Hermoso	9 May 1990 (aged 33)	109	52	(Mexican Football Federation) Tigres UANL
11	MF	Alexia Putellas (Captain)	4 February 1994 (aged 30)	113	30	(Royal Spanish Football Federation) Barcelona
12	DF	Oihane Hernández	4 May 2000 (aged 23)	17	1	(Royal Spanish Football Federation) Real Madrid
13	GK	Catalina Coll	23 April 2001 (aged 22)	8	0	(Royal Spanish Football Federation) Barcelona
14	DF	Laia Aleixandri	25 August 2000 (aged 23)	22	2	(The Football Association) Manchester City
15	FW	Eva Navarro	27 January 2001 (aged 23)	18	4	(Royal Spanish Football Federation) Atlético Madrid
16	DF	Laia Codina	22 January 2000 (aged 24)	10	2	(The Football Association) Arsenal
17	FW	Lucía García	14 July 1998 (aged 25)	42	10	(The Football Association) Manchester United
18	MF	Maite Oroz	25 March 1998 (aged 25)	12	4	(Royal Spanish Football Federation) Real Madrid
19	DF	Olga Carmona	12 June 2000 (aged 23)	36	3	(Royal Spanish Football Federation) Real Madrid
20	MF	Fiamma Benítez	19 June 2004 (aged 19)	8	2	(Royal Spanish Football Federation) Valencia
21	MF	Victoria López	26 July 2006 (aged 17)	0	0	(Royal Spanish Football Federation) Barcelona
22	FW	Athenea del Castillo	24 October 2000 (aged 23)	37	12	(Royal Spanish Football Federation) Real Madrid
23	GK	Elene Lete	7 May 2002 (aged 21)	1	0	(Royal Spanish Football Federation) Real Sociedad
	MF	Sheila García	15 March 1997 (aged 26)	18	0	(Royal Spanish Football Federation) Atlético Madrid
	MF	María Pérez	24 December 2001 (aged 22)	5	0	(Royal Spanish Football Federation) Sevilla
