= 2024–25 Supercopa de España Femenina =

2024–25 Supercopa de España
Spanish Women's Super Cup

Tournament details
- Host country: Spain
- City: Leganés
- Dates: 22–26 January 2025
- Teams: 4

Final positions
- Champions: Barcelona (5th title)
- Runners-up: Real Madrid

Tournament statistics
- Matches played: 3
- Goals scored: 13 (4.33 per match)
- Top scorer(s): Caroline Graham Hansen; Ewa Pajor; Clàudia Pina; Amaiur Sarriegi (2 goals each)

The 2024–25 Supercopa de España Femenina was the sixth edition of the current Supercopa de España Femenina, an annual women's football competition for clubs in the Spanish football league system that were successful in its major competitions in the preceding season.

Barcelona were defending champions and won their fifth (fourth consecutive) Supercopa title after defeating Real Madrid 5–0 in the final. It was the first time Real Madrid had reached a Supercopa final, and the first time a Women's Clásico match took place as a competition final. With Real Madrid failing to score against Barcelona, the final also marked two calendar years (since the 2023 Supercopa semi-final) that Real Madrid had gone goalless in Clásicos.

== Draw ==
The draw for the competition took place in July 2024 ahead of the 2024–25 Liga F season, deciding which of the qualified teams would face each other. At the time of the draw, the location had not been decided, with the announcement that this would happen at the end of December 2024. On 20 December, it was reported that the tournament would be hosted in Leganés as it had been in the previous season, with all matches taking place at the same stadium, the Estadio Municipal de Butarque.

== Qualification ==
The competition featured both finalists of the 2023–24 Copa de la Reina, as well as the next two highest-ranked clubs in the 2023–24 Liga F that had not already qualified through the cup final. As Barcelona were champions of all titles in 2023–24, the second- and third-placed league teams were qualified.

=== Qualified teams ===
The following four teams qualified for the tournament.

Team	Method of qualification
Barcelona	2023–24 Copa de la Reina winner
Real Sociedad	2023–24 Copa de la Reina runner-up
Real Madrid	2023–24 Liga F runner-up
Atlético Madrid	2023–24 Liga F third place

== Matches ==
Source: Press Sheet PDF

=== Bracket ===
Semi-finals
22 January 2025
Barcelona	3
Atlético Madrid	0
23 January 2025
Real Madrid	3
Real Sociedad	2

Final
26 January 2025
Barcelona	5
Real Madrid	0

=== Semi-finals ===
22 January 2025
19:00 CET (UTC+1)

Barcelona	3–0	Atlético Madrid
Pina 44', 73'; Hansen 90+2'	Report	Queiroz (yellow card) 28'; Ajibade (yellow card) 49'

Estadio Municipal de Butarque, Leganés
Attendance: 4,570
Referee: Eugenia Gil Soriano

23 January 2025
19:00 CET (UTC+1)

Real Madrid	3–2	Real Sociedad
Weir 4'; Angeldahl 37'; Caicedo 71'; Toletti (yellow card) 90+9'	Report	Sarriegi 10', 90+5'; Eguiguren (yellow card) 73'; Sarasola (yellow card) 84'

Estadio Municipal de Butarque, Leganés
Attendance: 3,651
Referee: Planes Terol

=== Final ===
26 January 2025
12:00 CET (UTC+1)

Barcelona	5–0	Real Madrid
Hansen 31'; Pajor 37', 45+4'; Guijarro 62'; Putellas 84'	Report

Estadio Municipal de Butarque, Leganés
Attendance: 9,452
Referee: Olatz Rivera Olmedo

Barcelona	Real Madrid

GK	13	(Spain) Cata Coll
DF	22	(Spain) Ona Batlle	(substituted off) 78'
DF	2	(Spain) Irene Paredes
DF	4	(Spain) Mapi León
DF	16	(Sweden) Fridolina Rolfö	(substituted off) 65'
MF	12	(Spain) Patricia Guijarro	(substituted off) 85'
MF	14	(Spain) Aitana Bonmatí
MF	11	(Spain) Alexia Putellas (c)
FW	10	(Norway) Caroline Graham Hansen	(substituted off) 65'
FW	17	(Poland) Ewa Pajor
FW	9	(Spain) Clàudia Pina	(substituted off) 78'
Substitutes:
GK	1	(Spain) Gemma Font
GK	25	(England) Ellie Roebuck
DF	5	(Spain) Jana Fernández	(substituted on) 78' (yellow card) 81'
DF	8	(Spain) Marta Torrejón
MF	23	(Norway) Ingrid Engen
MF	18	(Portugal) Kika Nazareth
MF	19	(Spain) Vicky López	(substituted on) 78'
MF	21	(England) Keira Walsh	(substituted on) 85'
MF	24	(Netherlands) Esmee Brugts	(substituted on) 65'
MF	28	(Spain) Alba Caño
FW	7	(Spain) Salma Paralluelo	(substituted on) 65'
Manager:
(Spain) Pere Romeu

GK	1	(Spain) Misa Rodríguez
DF	5	(Brazil) Antônia
DF	23	(France) Maëlle Lakrar
DF	14	(Spain) María Méndez
DF	7	(Spain) Olga Carmona (c)
MF	18	(Colombia) Linda Caicedo
MF	6	(France) Sandie Toletti	(yellow card) 36'
MF	21	(Sweden) Filippa Angeldahl
FW	11	(Spain) Alba Redondo	(substituted off) 66'
FW	10	(Scotland) Caroline Weir	(substituted off) 66'
FW	9	(Denmark) Signe Bruun	(substituted off) 79'
Substitutes:
GK	13	(France) Mylène Chavas
GK	26	(Spain) Laia López
DF	2	(Spain) Oihane Hernández
DF	4	(Spain) Rocío Gálvez
DF	12	(Brazil) Yasmim
DF	15	(Spain) Sheila García
MF	3	(Spain) Teresa Abelleira	(substituted on) 79'
FW	16	(Denmark) Caroline Møller
FW	19	(Spain) Eva Navarro	(substituted on) 66'
FW	22	(Spain) Athenea del Castillo	(substituted on) 66'
Manager:
(Spain) Alberto Toril

Most valuable player (MVP):
Patricia Guijarro (Barcelona)

Assistant referees:
Silvia Fernández Pérez
Andrea Peña Peña
Fourth official:
Beatriz Cuesta Arribas
Video assistant referee:
Marta Huerta de Aza
Assistant video assistant referees:
Rocío Puente Pino
Daniel Trujillo Suárez

Match rules

- 90 minutes.
- 30 minutes of extra time if necessary.
- Penalty shoot-out if scores still level.
- Maximum of twelve named substitutes.
- Maximum of five substitutions, with a sixth allowed in extra time. (Note: Each team was given only three opportunities to make substitutions, with a fourth opportunity in extra time, excluding substitutions made at half-time, before the start of extra time and at half-time in extra time.)
- Maximum of one concussion substitution.

== Criticisms ==
The competition was intended to feature the use of video assistant referee (VAR), however in the first semi-final, the technology did not function for the first 70 minutes of the match. It was also initially intended that semi-automated offside technology would be used, but the stadium was not fitted with this. In the first semi-final, there were multiple questionable calls relating to offside goals and penalties for both teams taken before the 70th minute. The technical group released a statement after the match explaining the deficiency and assuring that the VAR technology would be available from the start of the second semi-final. Barcelona goalkeeper Cata Coll opined that the lack of VAR was confusing, as they were only informed when on the pitch, but that at least if the match had started without VAR it should have ended without VAR, as referee actions changed.

Commenters also criticised the low attendance for high-profile matches, blaming this on the organisation of the RFEF for not naming a venue until less than a month before the competition, and for changing the dates of the semi-finals, preventing supporters (especially those from Barcelona and Donostia-San Sebastián) from being able to plan to attend. Travelling teams was also the focus of complaints from pundits about the prize money awarded: the winning team would win €27,500 but the cost of the non-Madrid teams to travel and accommodate their players for the duration was an estimated €63,000 per team.

During the competition it was announced that the RFEF was planning to include the Supercopa de España Femenina in negotiations with Saudi Arabia, where the men's Supercopa de España has been held for several years, for the women's competition to also be held in Saudi Arabia in future editions until 2034. Players and fans were immediately and strongly critical of this, with protests based in both economic and cultural arguments: criticisms referred to the still-growing women's football audience within Spain, the fact Barcelona Femení attract larger crowds than any other team when properly promoted, and Saudi Arabia's poor track record of women's and LGBTQ+ rights. Alexia Putellas and Aitana Bonmatí, Barcelona players and multiple Ballon d'Or winners, both vehemently rejected the prospect of playing the Supercopa in Saudi Arabia.

== See also ==
- 2024–25 Copa de la Reina
