= 2024–25 Real Madrid Femenino season =

Real Madrid Femenino
2024–25 season
- President: Florentino Pérez
- Head coach: Alberto Toril
- Stadium: Alfredo Di Stéfano Stadium
- Liga F: 2nd
- Copa de la Reina: Semi-finals
- Supercopa de España: Runners-up
- UEFA Champions League: Quarter-finals
- Top goalscorer: League: Alba Redondo (15 goals); All: Alba Redondo (20 goals)
- Biggest win: Home: Real Madrid 7–0 Twente (13 November 2024); Away: Espanyol 0–5 Real Madrid (6 September 2024)
- Biggest defeat: Home: Real Madrid 0–5 Barcelona (6 March 2025); Away: Barcelona 5–0 Real Madrid (26 January 2025)
Home colours	Away colours	Third colours
- All statistics correct as of 20 May 2025.

The 2024–25 season was the 9th season in the existence of Real Madrid Femenino and the club's 5th season since being officially rebranded as part of Real Madrid.

== Summary ==
=== Pre-season ===
On 17 June 2024, Real Madrid announced the departure of their first captain Ivana Andrés having played for the club for four seasons. The next day, the exit of Claudia Zornoza was announced. On 19 June, Real Madrid announced that Kenti Robles would also be leaving the club, with the departures of Sofie Svava, Kathellen, Freja Olofsson, and Hayley Raso also being confirmed over the next four days. On July 1, the first signing of the new season, Filippa Angeldahl, was announced. The next day, the club announced the signing of Alba Redondo On July 3, it was announced that Melanie Leupolz was joining the club for the new season. Maëlle Lakrar was announced to be joining the club the next day. On 6 July, Eva Navarro became the club's fifth signing ahead of the new season. The next week, Real Madrid announced the signings of Antônia, Sheila García, and María Méndez.

== Players ==
=== Current squad ===
As of 18 May 2025.

Note: Flags indicate national team as defined under FIFA eligibility rules; some limited exceptions apply. Players may hold more than one non-FIFA nationality.

No.	Pos.	Nation	Player
1	GK	ESP	Misa Rodríguez (vice-captain)
3	MF	ESP	Teresa Abelleira (3rd captain)
4	DF	ESP	Rocío Gálvez
5	DF	BRA	Antônia
6	MF	FRA	Sandie Toletti
7	DF	ESP	Olga Carmona (captain)
9	FW	DEN	Signe Bruun
10	MF	SCO	Caroline Weir
11	FW	ESP	Alba Redondo
12	DF	BRA	Yasmim
13	GK	FRA	Mylène Chavas
14	DF	ESP	María Méndez
15	DF	ESP	Sheila García
16	FW	DEN	Caroline Møller

No.	Pos.	Nation	Player
17	FW	ESP	Carla Camacho
18	FW	COL	Linda Caicedo
19	FW	ESP	Eva Navarro
20	FW	FRA	Naomie Feller
21	MF	SWE	Filippa Angeldahl
22	FW	ESP	Athenea del Castillo
23	DF	FRA	Maëlle Lakrar
24	MF	GER	Melanie Leupolz
26	GK	ESP	Laia López
29	DF	ESP	Silvia Cristóbal
33	DF	ESP	Noemí Bejarano
36	MF	ESP	Irune Dorado
39	MF	ESP	Elsa Santos
40	FW	ESP	Paula Comendador

== Transfers ==
=== In ===
Date	Pos.	Player	From	Type	Ref.
1 July 2024	FW	(Spain) Paula Partido	(Scotland) Celtic	Loan return	
1 July 2024	MF	(Sweden) Filippa Angeldahl	(England) Manchester City	Free transfer	
2 July 2024	FW	(Spain) Alba Redondo	(Spain) Levante	Free transfer	
3 July 2024	MF	(Germany) Melanie Leupolz	(England) Chelsea	Transfer	
4 July 2024	DF	(France) Maëlle Lakrar	(France) Montpellier	Free transfer	
6 July 2024	FW	(Spain) Eva Navarro	(Spain) Atlético Madrid	Free transfer	
8 July 2024	DF	(Brazil) Antônia	(Spain) Levante	Free transfer	
9 July 2024	DF	(Spain) Sheila García	(Spain) Atlético Madrid	Free transfer	
10 July 2024	DF	(Spain) María Méndez	(Spain) Levante	Free transfer	
2 January 2025	DF	(Brazil) Yasmim	(Brazil) Corinthians	Free transfer	

=== Out ===
Date	Pos.	Player	To	Type	Ref.
1 July 2024	DF	(Spain) Ivana Andrés	(Italy) Inter	End of contract	
1 July 2024	MF	(Spain) Claudia Zornoza	(United States) Utah Royals	End of contract	
1 July 2024	DF	(Mexico) Kenti Robles	(Mexico) Pachuca	End of contract	
1 July 2024	DF	(Denmark) Sofie Svava	(France) Lyon	End of contract	
1 July 2024	DF	(Brazil) Kathellen	(Saudi Arabia) Al Nassr	End of contract	
1 July 2024	MF	(Sweden) Freja Olofsson	(Spain) Madrid CFF	End of contract	
1 July 2024	FW	(Australia) Hayley Raso	(England) Tottenham Hotspur	End of contract	
9 July 2024	DF	(Spain) María Valle	(Spain) Real Sociedad	Loan	
17 July 2024	MF	(Spain) Olaya Rodríguez	(Spain) Deportivo Abanca	Loan	
18 July 2024	FW	(Spain) Paula Partido	(Spain) Sevilla	Loan	
13 September 2024	MF	(Spain) Maite Oroz	(England) Tottenham Hotspur	Transfer	
14 February 2025	DF	(Spain) Oihane Hernández	(United States) Orlando Pride	Transfer	

== Pre-season and friendlies ==
Win Draw Loss Fixtures

17 August 2024 Trofeo Teide	UD Tenerife (Spain)	1–1 (7–6 p)	(Spain) Real Madrid	Tenerife
20:00 WEST (UTC+1)	María José 79'	Report	Lara 90+3' (o.g.)	Stadium: Estadio Municipal Los Cuartos
	Penalties
	Pisco (penalty scored); María José (penalty scored); Estella (penalty missed); Monday (penalty scored); Koko (penalty scored); Eulalia (penalty scored); Andrea (penalty scored); Lara (penalty scored)		(penalty scored) Oroz; (penalty scored) Rocío; (penalty missed) Møller; (penalty scored) Pau Comendador; (penalty scored) Amaya; (penalty scored) Marisa; (penalty scored) Irune; (penalty missed) Elsa

25 August 2024 Friendly	Real Madrid (Spain)	1–1	(Spain) Madrid CFF	Madrid
21:00 CEST (UTC+2)	Bruun 82'	Report	McKenna 55'	Stadium: Estadio Alfredo Di Stéfano

1 September 2024 Torneo Cantarrana	Deportivo Abanca (Spain)	Cancelled	(Spain) Real Madrid	Viveiro
11:00 CEST (UTC+2)		Report		Stadium: Campo Municipal de Cantarrana

1 September 2024 Friendly	Deportivo Abanca (Spain)	0–2	(Spain) Real Madrid	Abegondo
		Report	Navarro 58'; Hernández 85'	Stadium: Cidade Deportiva de Abegondo

== Competitions ==
=== Overall record ===
Competition	First match	Last match	Starting round	Final position	Record							
Competition	First match	Last match	Starting round	Final position	Pld	W	D	L	GF	GA	GD	Win %
Liga F	6 September 2024	18 May 2025	Matchday 1	2nd	30	24	4	2	87	28	+59	80.00
Copa de la Reina	20 December 2024	12 March 2025	Round of 16	Semi-finals	4	2	0	2	6	9	−3	50.00
Supercopa de España	21 January 2025	26 January 2025	Semi-finals	Runners-up	2	1	0	1	3	7	−4	50.00
UEFA Women's Champions League	19 September 2024	26 March 2025	Second qualifying round	Quarter-finals	10	7	0	3	27	12	+15	70.00
Total					46	34	4	8	123	56	+67	73.91

Source: Soccerway

=== Liga F ===
==== League table ====
Pos	Team	Pld	W	D	L	GF	GA	GD	Pts	Qualification or relegation
1	Barcelona (C)	30	28	0	2	128	16	+112	84	Qualification for the Champions League league phase
2	Real Madrid	30	24	4	2	87	28	+59	76	Qualification for the Champions League third qualifying round
3	Atlético Madrid	30	16	10	4	49	23	+26	58	Qualification for the Champions League third qualifying round
4	Athletic Club	30	16	3	11	40	32	+8	51	
5	Granada	30	14	3	13	42	45	−3	45	

Source: LigaF.es
Rules for classification: 1) Points; 2) Head-to-head points; 3) Goal difference; 4) Number of goals scored
(C) Champions

==== Results summary ====
Overall								Home						Away					
Pld	W	D	L	GF	GA	GD	Pts	W	D	L	GF	GA	GD	W	D	L	GF	GA	GD
30	24	4	2	87	28	+59	76	10	3	2	43	17	+26	14	1	0	44	11	+33

Source: La Liga

==== Results by round ====
Match	1	2	3	4	5	6	7	8	9	10	11	12	13	14	15	16	17	18	19	20	21	22	23	24	25	26	27	28	29	30
Ground	A	A	H	A	H	H	A	H	A	H	A	H	A	H	H	A	H	A	H	A	A	H	A	H	A	H	H	A	H	A
Result	W	W	W	W	W	D	W	W	W	L	W	W	W	W	L	W	W	W	W	W	W	D	W	W	W	W	W	W	D	D
Position	1	1	1	2	2	2	2	3	2	3	3	2	2	2	2	2	2	2	2	2	2	2	2	2	2	2	2	2	2	2

Source: La Liga
A = Away; H = Home; W = Win; D = Draw; L = Loss; P = Postponed

==== Matches ====
6 September 2024 1	Espanyol	0–5	Real Madrid	Sant Adrià de Besòs
20:00 CET (UTC+2)		Report	Méndez 13'; Weir 24', 56'; del Castillo 58'; Oroz 84'	Stadium: Ciutat Esportiva Dani Jarque; Referee: Beatriz Cuesta Arribas

14 September 2024 2	Real Betis	0–3	Real Madrid	Seville
18:30 CET (UTC+2)		Report	Bruun 10', 28'; Toletti 45'	Stadium: Ciudad Deportiva Luis del Sol; Referee: Olatz Rivera Olmedo

22 September 2024 3	Real Madrid	2–0	Athletic Club	Madrid
19:00 CET (UTC+2)	Carmona 18' (pen.); Zubieta 23' (o.g.)	Report		Stadium: Alfredo Di Stéfano Stadium; Referee: Ainara Andrea Acevedo Dudley

29 September 2024 4	Costa Adeje Tenerife	1–4	Real Madrid	San Isidro
19:00 CET (UTC+1)	Babajide 35' (pen.)	Report	Møller 29', 45'; Caicedo 31'; Angeldahl 90+2'	Stadium: Campo de Fútbol de Adeje; Referee: Amy Peñalver Pearce

4 October 2024 5	Real Madrid	1–0	Valencia	Madrid
19:00 CET (UTC+2)	Carmona 26'	Report		Stadium: Alfredo Di Stéfano Stadium; Referee: Ylenia Sánchez Miguel

13 October 2024 6	Real Madrid	1–1	Atlético Madrid	Madrid
20:00 CET (UTC+2)	Weir 7'	Report	Bøe Risa 78' (pen.)	Stadium: Alfredo Di Stéfano Stadium; Referee: Paola Cebollada López

20 October 2024 7	Madrid CFF	0–1	Real Madrid	Fuenlabrada
19:00 CET (UTC+2)		Report	Bruun 17'	Stadium: Estadio Fernando Torres; Referee: Andrea Fernández Firvida

8 January 2025 8	Real Madrid	6–0	Levante	Madrid
20:00 CET (UTC+1)	del Castillo 12', 45+3'; Redondo 46'; Abelleira 66'; Bruun 68'; Møller 88'	Report		Stadium: Alfredo Di Stéfano Stadium; Referee: Elena Peláez Arnillas

9 November 2024 9	Levante Badalona	1–3	Real Madrid	Sant Joan Despí
16:00 CET (UTC+1)	González 19'	Report	Feller 76'; Redondo 89', 90+7'	Stadium: Municipal de Les Planes; Referee: María Eugenia Gil Soriano

17 November 2024 10	Real Madrid	0–4	Barcelona	Madrid
20:00 CET (UTC+1)		Report	Guijarro 4', 22'; Pina 39'; Putellas 86'	Stadium: Alfredo Di Stéfano Stadium; Attendance: 5,210; Referee: Zulema González González

4 February 2025 11	Real Sociedad	1–4	Real Madrid	San Sebastián
19:00 CET (UTC+1)	Pardo 71'	Report	Bruun 5', 27'; Jacinto 69' (o.g.); Redondo 84'	Stadium: Zubieta Facilities; Referee: Ainara Andrea Acevedo Dudley

8 December 2024 12	Real Madrid	4–1	Sevilla	Madrid
17:00 CET (UTC+1)	García 19'; Toletti 25'; Caicedo 29'; Bruun 45+2'	Report	López 73'	Stadium: Alfredo Di Stéfano Stadium; Referee: Amy Peñalver Pearce

15 December 2024 13	Deportivo Abanca	1–4	Real Madrid	A Coruña
16:30 CET (UTC+1)	Lara 36'	Report	Carmona 79'; Redondo 85'; Méndez 89'; Bruun 90+5'	Stadium: Cidade Deportiva de Abegondo; Referee: Paola Cebollada López

12 January 2025 14	Real Madrid	3–1	Granada	Madrid
16:00 CET (UTC+1)	Lakrar 15'; Bruun 60'; Navarro 90+4'	Report	Imade 27'	Stadium: Alfredo Di Stéfano Stadium; Referee: Zulema González González

19 January 2025 15	Real Madrid	0–1	Eibar	Madrid
12:00 CET (UTC+1)		Report	Álvarez 28'	Stadium: Alfredo Di Stéfano Stadium; Referee: Elena Peláez Arnillas

5 January 2025 16	Atlético Madrid	1–2	Real Madrid	Alcalá de Henares
12:00 CET (UTC+1)	Rodríguez 65' (o.g.)	Report	Caicedo 44'; García 53' (o.g.)	Stadium: Centro Deportivo Wanda Alcalá de Henares; Referee: María Gloria Planes Terol

31 January 2025 17	Real Madrid	5–0	Espanyol	Madrid
20:00 CET (UTC+1)	Lakrar 39'; del Castillo 45+2'; Caicedo 51'; Redondo 64'; Méndez 90+2'	Report		Stadium: Alfredo Di Stéfano Stadium; Referee: Elia María Martínez Martínez

8 February 2025 18	Levante	1–2	Real Madrid	Buñol
14:00 CET (UTC+1)	Alonso 42'	Report	Weir 23' (pen.); Redondo 27'	Stadium: Ciudad Deportiva de Buñol; Referee: Andrea Fernández Firvida

16 February 2025 19	Real Madrid	3–2	Levante Badalona	Madrid
18:00 CET (UTC+1)	Navarro 40'; Lakrar 45+1'; Redondo 90+3'	Report	Llompart 13' (pen.); Elloh 81'	Stadium: Alfredo Di Stéfano Stadium; Referee: Beatriz Cuesta Arribas

2 March 2025 20	Athletic Club	1–2	Real Madrid	Bilbao
12:00 CET (UTC+1)	García 10' (pen.)	Report	Lakrar 40'; Carmona 80'	Stadium: San Mamés Stadium; Referee: María Gloria Planes Terol

9 March 2025 21	Sevilla	0–4	Real Madrid	Seville
14:00 CET (UTC+1)		Report	Redondo 34', 70'; del Castillo 41'; Feller 90+1'	Stadium: Estadio Jesús Navas; Referee: Amy Peñalver Pearce

15 March 2025 22	Real Madrid	2–2	Deportivo Abanca	Madrid
12:00 CET (UTC+1)	Camacho 53'; Carmona 82' (pen.)	Report	Rodríguez 24' (pen.); Antônia 62' (o.g.)	Stadium: Alfredo Di Stéfano Stadium; Referee: Ylenia Sánchez Miguel

23 March 2025 23	Barcelona	1–3	Real Madrid	Barcelona
12:00 CET (UTC+1)	Hansen 67'	Report	Redondo 41'; Weir 87', 96'	Stadium: Estadi Olímpic Lluís Companys; Referee: Olatz Rivera Olmedo

30 March 2025 24	Real Madrid	3–0	Real Sociedad	Madrid
18:00 CET (UTC+2)	Weir 4'; Møller 71'; del Castillo 77'	Report		Stadium: Alfredo Di Stéfano Stadium; Referee: Ainara Andrea Acevedo Dudley

12 April 2025 25	Eibar	0–3	Real Madrid	Eibar
18:30 CET (UTC+2)		Report	Feller 50'; Caicedo 79'; Bruun 90+4'	Stadium: Ipurua Municipal Stadium; Referee: Andrea Fernández Firvida

20 April 2025 26	Real Madrid	5–1	Real Betis	Madrid
16:00 CET (UTC+2)	Weir 9' (pen.); Bruun 24', 40'; Méndez 28'; Angeldahl 37'	Report	Zouhir 44'	Stadium: Alfredo Di Stéfano Stadium; Referee: Marta Huerta de Aza

25 April 2025 27	Real Madrid	7–3	Madrid CFF	Madrid
19:30 CET (UTC+2)	Redondo 15', 47'; Angeldahl 24', 90+1'; Villafañe 81' (o.g.); Weir 85'; Caicedo 90+6'	Report	Nautnes 41', 51'; Andonova 53'	Stadium: Alfredo Di Stéfano Stadium; Referee: Paola Cebollada López

4 May 2025 28	Granada	1–2	Real Madrid	Granada
16:00 CET (UTC+2)	Imade 72'	Report	Weir 11'; Caicedo 85'	Stadium: Ciudad Deportiva del Granada CF; Referee: Amy Peñalver Pearce

11 May 2025 29	Real Madrid	1–1	Costa Adeje Tenerife	Madrid
12:00 CET (UTC+2)	Møller 89'	Report	Babajide 62'	Stadium: Alfredo Di Stéfano Stadium; Referee: Lorena Del Mar

18 May 2025 30	Valencia	2–2	Real Madrid	Paterna
12:00 CET (UTC+2)	López 66' (o.g.); Marcos 89'	Report	Redondo 6', 49'	Stadium: Ciudad Deportiva de Paterna; Referee: Elia María Martínez Martínez

=== Copa de la Reina ===
20 December 2024 Round of 16	Villarreal	0–2	Real Madrid	Villarreal
19:00 CET (UTC+1)		Report	Redondo 30'; Abelleira 61'	Stadium: Ciudad Deportiva Villarreal CF; Referee: Beatriz Cuesta Arribas

13 February 2025 Quarter-finals	Real Madrid	3–1 (a.e.t.)	Real Sociedad	Madrid
21:00 CET (UTC+1)	Weir 22'; Toletti 95'; Caicedo 106'	Report	Sarriegi 45+1'	Stadium: Alfredo Di Stéfano Stadium; Attendance: 954; Referee: Zulema González González

6 March 2025 Semi-finals - First Leg	Real Madrid	0–5	Barcelona	Madrid
19:00 CET (UTC+1)		Report	Paralluelo 1', 41'; Pajor 13', 27', 77'	Stadium: Alfredo Di Stéfano Stadium; Attendance: 2,185; Referee: Marta Huerta de Aza

12 March 2025 Semi-finals - Second Leg	Barcelona	3–1	Real Madrid	Sant Joan Despí
19:00 CET (UTC+1)	Guijarro 24'; Pajor 48', 68'	Report	Bruun 90+2'	Stadium: Johan Cruyff Stadium; Attendance: 3,689; Referee: Elena Peláez Arnillas

=== Supercopa de España Femenina ===
23 January 2025 Semifinal	Real Madrid	3–2	Real Sociedad	Leganés
19:00 CET (UTC+1)	Weir 4'; Angeldahl 37'; Caicedo 71'	Report	Sarriegi 10', 90+5'	Stadium: Estadio Municipal de Butarque; Attendance: 3,651; Referee: María Gloria Planes Terol

26 January 2025 Final	Barcelona	5–0	Real Madrid	Leganés
12:00 CET (UTC+1)	Hansen 31'; Pajor 37', 45+3'; Guijarro 63'; Putellas 85'	Report		Stadium: Estadio Municipal de Butarque; Attendance: 9,452; Referee: Olatz Rivera Olmedo

=== UEFA Champions League ===
==== Second Qualifying Round ====
The second round draw was held on 9 September 2024.

19 September 2024 First leg	Sporting CP (Portugal)	1–2	(Spain) Real Madrid	Alcochete
17:00 CET (UTC+2)	Bravo 45+4' (pen.)	Report	Athenea 11'; Leupolz 90+6'	Stadium: Aurélio Pereira Stadium; Attendance: 624; Referee: Emanuela Rusta (Albania)

26 September 2024 Second leg	Real Madrid (Spain)	3–1	(Portugal) Sporting CP	Madrid
20:00 CET (UTC+2)	Toletti 7', 51'; Redondo 90+4'	Report	Capeta 5'	Stadium: Alfredo Di Stéfano; Attendance: 1,238; Referee: Shona Shukrula (Netherlands)

Real Madrid won 5–2 on aggregate.

==== Group stage ====
The group stage draw was held on 27 September 2024.

Pos	Team	Pld	W	D	L	GF	GA	GD	Pts	Qualification	CHE	RMA	TWE	CEL
1	(England) Chelsea	6	6	0	0	19	6	+13	18	Advance to quarter-finals	—	3–2	6–1	3–0
2	(Spain) Real Madrid	6	4	0	2	20	7	+13	12	Advance to quarter-finals	1–2	—	7–0	4–0
3	(Netherlands) Twente	6	2	0	4	9	19	−10	6		1–3	2–3	—	3–0
4	(Scotland) Celtic	6	0	0	6	1	17	−16	0		1–2	0–3	0–2	—

Source: UEFA
Rules for classification: Group stage tiebreakers

8 October 2024	Chelsea (England)	3–2	(Spain) Real Madrid	Fulham
21:00 CET (UTC+2)	Nüsken 2'; Reiten 27' (pen.); Ramírez 53'	Report	Redondo 39'; Caicedo 84'	Stadium: Stamford Bridge; Attendance: 3,832; Referee: Ivana Martinčić (Croatia)

17 October 2024	Real Madrid (Spain)	4–0	(Scotland) Celtic	Madrid
18:45 CET (UTC+2)	Weir 7'; Bruun 72'; Møller 80'; Caicedo 83' (pen.)	Report		Stadium: Estadio Alfredo Di Stéfano; Attendance: 1,139; Referee: Silvia Gasperotti (Italy)

13 November 2024	Real Madrid (Spain)	7–0	(Netherlands) Twente	Madrid
18:45 CET (UTC+1)	Bruun 3'; Méndez 13', 63'; Feller 50'; Weir 55'; Hernández 65'; Camacho 90+2'	Report		Stadium: Estadio Alfredo Di Stéfano; Attendance: 1,017; Referee: Christian-Petru Ciochirca (Austria)

20 November 2024	Twente (Netherlands)	2–3	(Spain) Real Madrid	Enschede
18:45 CET (UTC+1)	Ravensbergen 29'; Te Brake 90+6'	Report	Caicedo 45+2'; Bruun 71'; Redondo 90+4'	Stadium: De Grolsch Veste; Attendance: 8,091; Referee: Katalin Kulcsár (Hungary)

11 December 2024	Celtic (Scotland)	0–3	(Spain) Real Madrid	Hamilton
21:00 CET (UTC+1)		Report	Bruun 30', 71'; Redondo 85'	Stadium: New Douglas Park; Attendance: 1,314; Referee: Iuliana Elena Demetrescu (Romania)

17 December 2024	Real Madrid (Spain)	1–2	(England) Chelsea	Madrid
18:45 CET (UTC+1)	Weir 7'	Report	Macário 51' (pen.), 56' (pen.)	Stadium: Estadio Alfredo Di Stéfano; Attendance: 2,057; Referee: Maria Sole Ferrieri Caputi (Italy)

==== Knockout phase ====
===== Quarter-finals =====
18 March 2025 First leg	Real Madrid (Spain)	2–0	(England) Arsenal	Madrid
18:45 CET (UTC+1)	Caicedo 22'; del Castillo 83'	Report		Stadium: Estadio Alfredo Di Stéfano; Attendance: 3,102; Referee: Frida Klarlund (Denmark)

26 March 2025 Second leg	Arsenal (England)	3–0 (2–3 agg.)	(Spain) Real Madrid	Holloway
21:00 CET (UTC+1)	Russo 46', 59'; Caldentey 49'	Report		Stadium: Emirates Stadium; Attendance: 22,517; Referee: Silvia Gasperotti (Italy)

== Statistics ==
=== Squad statistics ===
As of match played 18 May 2025.

No.	Pos	Nat	Player	Total		Liga F		Copa de la Reina		Supercopa de España		Champions League	
No.	Pos	Nat	Player	Apps	Goals	Apps	Goals	Apps	Goals	Apps	Goals	Apps	Goals
Goalkeepers
1	GK	(Spain) ESP	Misa Rodríguez	39	0	24	0	3	0	2	0	10	0
13	GK	(France) FRA	Mylène Chavas	5	0	4	0	1	0	0	0	0	0
26	GK	(Spain) ESP	Laia López	2	0	2	0	0	0	0	0	0	0
Defenders
4	DF	(Spain) ESP	Rocío Gálvez	18	0	13+1	0	1	0	0	0	2+1	0
5	DF	(Brazil) BRA	Antônia	27	0	14+5	0	4	0	1+1	0	0+2	0
7	DF	(Spain) ESP	Olga Carmona	42	5	18+8	5	3+1	0	2	0	10	0
12	DF	(Brazil) BRA	Yasmim	15	0	11+1	0	1+1	0	0	0	0+1	0
14	DF	(Spain) ESP	María Méndez	38	6	20+3	4	3+1	0	2	0	9	2
15	DF	(Spain) ESP	Sheila García	36	1	15+9	1	0+4	0	1	0	5+2	0
23	DF	(France) FRA	Maëlle Lakrar	41	4	25+1	4	4	0	2	0	9	0
29	DF	(Spain) ESP	Silvia Cristóbal	1	0	0+1	0	0	0	0	0	0	0
33	DF	(Spain) ESP	Noemí Bejarano	1	0	0+1	0	0	0	0	0	0	0
Midfielders
3	MF	(Spain) ESP	Teresa Abelleira	29	2	13+6	1	1+1	1	0+2	0	1+5	0
6	MF	(France) FRA	Sandie Toletti	36	5	15+7	2	4	1	2	0	7+1	2
10	MF	(Scotland) SCO	Caroline Weir	41	15	17+9	10	2+1	1	2	1	10	3
21	MF	(Sweden) SWE	Filippa Angeldahl	44	5	21+7	4	3+1	0	2	1	8+2	0
24	MF	(Germany) GER	Melanie Leupolz	27	1	14+3	0	1	0	1	0	8	1
36	MF	(Spain) ESP	Irune Dorado	10	0	1+6	0	0+2	0	0	0	0+1	0
39	MF	(Spain) ESP	Elsa Santos	1	0	0+1	0	0	0	0	0	0	0
Forwards
9	FW	(Denmark) DEN	Signe Bruun	40	18	14+12	12	2+1	1	2	0	7+2	5
11	FW	(Spain) ESP	Alba Redondo	43	20	18+11	15	2+2	1	1+1	0	3+5	4
16	FW	(Denmark) DEN	Caroline Møller	20	6	8+7	5	0+1	0	0	0	1+3	1
17	FW	(Spain) ESP	Carla Camacho	9	2	1+6	1	0+1	0	0	0	0+1	1
18	FW	(Colombia) COL	Linda Caicedo	36	13	17+8	7	1	1	2	1	8	4
19	FW	(Spain) ESP	Eva Navarro	31	2	11+10	2	1+2	0	0+2	0	0+5	0
20	FW	(France) FRA	Naomie Feller	29	4	11+6	3	3	0	0	0	4+5	1
22	FW	(Spain) ESP	Athenea del Castillo	41	8	18+9	6	3+1	0	0+2	0	5+3	2
40	FW	(Spain) ESP	Paula Comendador	1	0	0+1	0	0	0	0	0	0	0
Players transferred out during the season
8	MF	(Spain) ESP	Maite Oroz	1	1	0+1	1	0	0	0	0	0	0
2	DF	(Spain) ESP	Oihane Hernández	18	1	4+7	0	1	0	0	0	5+1	1

Source: FBREF

=== Goals ===
As of match played 18 May 2025.

Rank	No.	Pos.	Nat.	Player	Liga F	CDLR	Supercopa	UWCL	Total
1	11	FW	(Spain)	Alba Redondo	15	1	–	4	20
2	9	FW	(Denmark)	Signe Bruun	12	1	–	5	18
3	10	MF	(Scotland)	Caroline Weir	10	1	1	3	15
4	18	FW	(Colombia)	Linda Caicedo	7	1	1	4	13
5	22	FW	(Spain)	Athenea del Castillo	6	–	–	2	8
6	14	DF	(Spain)	María Méndez	4	–	–	2	6
6	16	FW	(Denmark)	Caroline Møller	5	–	–	1	6
8	6	MF	(France)	Sandie Toletti	2	1	–	2	5
8	7	DF	(Spain)	Olga Carmona	5	–	–	–	5
8	21	MF	(Sweden)	Filippa Angeldahl	4	–	1	–	5
11	23	DF	(France)	Maëlle Lakrar	4	–	–	–	4
11	20	FW	(France)	Naomie Feller	3	–	–	1	4
13	3	MF	(Spain)	Teresa Abelleira	1	1	–	–	2
13	19	FW	(Spain)	Eva Navarro	2	–	–	–	2
13	17	FW	(Spain)	Carla Camacho	1	–	–	1	2
16	8	MF	(Spain)	Maite Oroz	1	–	–	–	1
16	24	MF	(Germany)	Melanie Leupolz	–	–	–	1	1
16	2	DF	(Spain)	Oihane Hernández	–	–	–	1	1
16	15	DF	(Spain)	Sheila García	1	–	–	–	1
Own goals (from the opponents)					4	–	–	–	4
Total					87	6	3	27	123

Source: FBREF

=== Clean sheets ===
As of match played 18 May 2025.

Rank	No.	Nat.	Player	Liga F	CDLR	Supercopa	UWCL	Total
1	1	(Spain)	Misa Rodríguez	8	–	–	4	12
2	13	(France)	Mylène Chavas	2	1	–	–	3
Total				10	1	0	4	15

Source: FBREF

== Awards ==
Name	Position	Award	Ref.
(Colombia) Linda Caicedo	Forward	The 100 Best Female Footballers in the World 2024 – #25	
(Spain) Olga Carmona	Defender	The 100 Best Female Footballers in the World 2024 – #44	
(Spain) Teresa Abelleira	Midfielder	The 100 Best Female Footballers in the World 2024 – #69	
(Scotland) Caroline Weir	Midfielder	The 100 Best Female Footballers in the World 2024 – #83	
(Spain) Olga Carmona	Defender	FIFPRO World 11 – Women's World XI 2024	
(Colombia) Linda Caicedo	Forward	FIFPRO World 11 – Women's World XI 2024	
(Colombia) Linda Caicedo	Forward	IFFHS Women's Youth (U20) World Team 2024	
(Colombia) Linda Caicedo	Forward	Liga F Player of the month – January	
