= 2023–24 Real Madrid Femenino season =

Real Madrid Femenino
2023–24 season
- President: Florentino Pérez
- Coach: Alberto Toril
- Stadium: Alfredo Di Stéfano Stadium
- Liga F: 2nd
- Copa de la Reina: Quarter-finals
- Supercopa de España: Semi-finals
- UEFA Champions League: Group stage
- Top goalscorer: League: Signe Bruun (13); All: Signe Bruun (14)
- Biggest win: 7–1 vs Real Sociedad; 7–1 vs Valencia
- Biggest defeat: 0–5 vs Barcelona
Home colours	Away colours	Third colours

The 2023–24 season is the 8th season in the existence of Real Madrid Femenino and the club's 4th season since being officially rebranded as part of Real Madrid.

== Players ==
=== Current squad ===
As of 10 July 2023

Note: Flags indicate national team as defined under FIFA eligibility rules; some limited exceptions apply. Players may hold more than one non-FIFA nationality.

No.	Pos.	Nation	Player
1	GK	ESP	Misa Rodríguez
2	DF	MEX	Kenti Robles
3	MF	ESP	Teresa Abelleira
4	DF	ESP	Rocío Gálvez
5	DF	ESP	Ivana Andrés (captain)
6	MF	FRA	Sandie Toletti
7	DF	ESP	Olga Carmona
8	MF	ESP	Maite Oroz
9	FW	DEN	Signe Bruun
10	MF	SCO	Caroline Weir
11	DF	ESP	Oihane Hernández

No.	Pos.	Nation	Player
13	GK	FRA	Mylène Chavas
14	DF	BRA	Kathellen
15	FW	AUS	Hayley Raso
16	FW	DEN	Caroline Møller
17	FW	ESP	Carla Camacho
18	FW	COL	Linda Caicedo
20	FW	FRA	Naomie Feller
21	MF	ESP	Claudia Zornoza
22	FW	ESP	Athenea del Castillo
23	DF	DEN	Sofie Svava
24	MF	SWE	Freja Olofsson

== Transfers ==
=== In ===
Date	Pos.	Player	From	Type	Ref.
3 July 2023	DF	(Spain) Oihane Hernández	(Spain) Athletic Club	Free transfer	
5 July 2023	GK	(France) Mylène Chavas	(France) Bordeaux	Free transfer	
8 July 2023	FW	(Australia) Hayley Raso	(England) Manchester City	Free transfer	
10 July 2023	FW	(Denmark) Signe Bruun	(France) Lyon	Free transfer	

=== Out ===
Date	Pos.	Player	To	Type	Ref.
1 July 2023	FW	(Spain) Esther González	(United States) Gotham FC	End of contract	
1 July 2023	FW	(Spain) Lorena Navarro	(Spain) Real Sociedad	End of contract	
1 July 2023	GK	(France) Méline Gérard	Retired		
1 July 2023	FW	(Spain) Claudia Florentino	(Spain) Valencia	End of contract	
1 July 2023	FW	(Spain) Marta Corredera	Free agent	End of contract	
12 July 2023	DF	(Spain) Lucía Rodríguez	(Spain) Sevilla FC	Contract termination	
22 August 2023	FW	(Spain) Nahikari García	(Spain) Athletic Club	Contract termination	

=== Contract renewals ===
Date	Pos.	Player	Contract length	Contract ends	Ref.
9 June 2023	MF	(Spain) Claudia Zornoza	One year	2024	
16 June 2023	FW	(Denmark) Caroline Møller	Two years	2025	
30 June 2023	MF	(Scotland) Caroline Weir	Three years	2026	
21 July 2023	FW	(Spain) Carla Camacho	Two years	2025	
16 May 2024	FW	(Spain) Athenea del Castillo	Four years	2028	
23 May 2024	DF	(Spain) Rocío Gálvez	Two years	2026	
28 May 2024	MF	(France) Sandie Toletti	Three years	2027	
30 May 2024	FW	(France) Naomie Feller	Two years	2026	
6 June 2024	MF	(Spain) Teresa Abelleira	Two years	2026	
13 June 2024	GK	(Spain) Misa Rodríguez	Two years	2026	

== Competitions ==
=== Overall record ===
Competition	First match	Last match	Starting round	Final position	Record							
Competition	First match	Last match	Starting round	Final position	Pld	W	D	L	GF	GA	GD	Win %
Liga F	15 September 2023	15 June 2024	Matchday 1	2nd	30	24	1	5	74	33	+41	80.00
Copa de la Reina	13 January 2024	8 February 2024	Round of 16	Quarter-finals	2	1	0	1	6	2	+4	50.00
Supercopa de España	19 January 2024		Semi-finals	Semi-finals	1	0	0	1	0	4	−4	0.00
UEFA Women's Champions League	11 October 2023	30 January 2024	Second qualifying round	Group stage	8	2	1	5	10	11	−1	25.00
Total					41	27	2	12	90	50	+40	65.85

Source: Soccerway

=== Liga F ===
==== League table ====
Pos	Team	Pld	W	D	L	GF	GA	GD	Pts	Qualification or relegation
1	Barcelona (C)	30	29	1	0	137	10	+127	88	Qualification for the Champions League group stage
2	Real Madrid	30	24	1	5	74	33	+41	73	Qualification for the Champions League second round
3	Atlético de Madrid	30	18	7	5	53	22	+31	61	Qualification for the Champions League first round
4	Levante	30	17	9	4	59	28	+31	60	
5	Athletic Club	30	17	2	11	38	37	+1	53	

Source: Liga F
Rules for classification: 1) Points; 2) Head-to-head points; 3) Goal difference; 4) Number of goals scored
(C) Champions

==== Results summary ====
Overall								Home						Away					
Pld	W	D	L	GF	GA	GD	Pts	W	D	L	GF	GA	GD	W	D	L	GF	GA	GD
30	24	1	5	74	33	+41	73	11	0	4	42	19	+23	13	1	1	32	14	+18

Source: La Liga

==== Results by round ====
Match	2	3	1^{1}	4	5	6	7	8	9	10	11	12	13	15	16	17	14^{2}	18	19	20	21	22	23	24	25	26	27	28	29	30
Ground	A	A	H	H	A	H	A	H	A	H	H	A	H	A	H	A	A	H	A	H	H	A	H	A	H	A	H	A	H	A
Result	W	W	W	W	W	L	W	W	L	W	L	W	W	W	W	W	D	W	W	W	L	W	W	W	W	W	L	W	W	W
Position	3	2	2	2	2	3	2	2	2	2	3	2	3	3	2	2	2	2	2	2	2	2	2	2	2	2	2	2	2	2

Source: La Liga
A = Away; H = Home; W = Win; D = Draw; L = Loss; P = Postponed
Notes:
- ^{1} Matchday 1 (vs Real Betis) was originally scheduled for 9 September 2023, but was postponed due to Liga F players' strike.
- ^{2} Matchday 14 (vs Atlético Madrid) was originally scheduled for 20 January 2024, but was postponed due to both teams' involvement in the Supercopa de España.

==== Matches ====
15 September 2023 2	Valencia	0–2	Real Madrid	Paterna
21:00 CET (UTC+1)		Report	del Castillo 1'; Feller 72'	Stadium: Ciudad Deportiva de Paterna; Referee: Olatz Rivera Olmedo

1 October 2023 3	Costa Adeje Tenerife	1–2	Real Madrid	San Isidro
12:00 CET (UTC+1)	Babajide 90+1'	Report	Bruun 34'; Oroz 88'	Stadium: Campo de Fútbol La Palmera; Referee: Arantza Gallastegui Pérez

4 October 2023 1	Real Madrid	5–1	Real Betis	Madrid
20:00 CET (UTC+1)	Oroz 2'; Raso 53'; Feller 59'; Perea 64' (o.g.); Bruun 76'	Report	Cameron 90+3'	Stadium: Estadio Alfredo Di Stéfano; Referee: Raquel Suárez González

7 October 2023 4	Real Madrid	1–0	Villarreal	Madrid
20:30 CET (UTC+1)	Bruun 90'	Report		Stadium: Estadio Alfredo Di Stéfano; Referee: Ainara Andrea Acevedo Dudley

14 October 2023 5	Granada	2–5	Real Madrid	Granada
18:30 CET (UTC+1)	Suárez 38'; Imade 56'	Report	del Castillo 13'; Feller 49'; Toletti 67', 68'; Bruun 89'	Stadium: Ciudad Deportiva del Granada CF; Referee: María Gloria Planes Terol

22 October 2023 6	Real Madrid	1–2	Levante	Madrid
18:30 CET (UTC+1)	Caicedo 50'	Report	Fernández 12'; Nunes 67'	Stadium: Estadio Alfredo Di Stéfano; Referee: Ylenia Sánchez Miguel

4 November 2023 7	Eibar	0–1	Real Madrid	Eibar
18:30 CET (UTC+1)		Report	Bruun 73'	Stadium: Ipurua Municipal Stadium; Referee: Elia María Martínez Martínez

10 November 2023 8	Real Madrid	7–1	Real Sociedad	Madrid
20:00 CET (UTC+1)	del Castillo 17', 36'; Bruun 26'; Raso 54'; Gálvez 65'; Oroz 77'; Feller 85'	Report	Eizagirre 47'	Stadium: Estadio Alfredo Di Stéfano; Referee: Paola Cebollada López

19 November 2023 9	Barcelona	5–0	Real Madrid	Barcelona
12:00 CET (UTC+1)	Bonmatí 17'; Hansen 43'; Caldentey 45+1'; Pina 90+1'; Vicky López 90+3'	Report		Stadium: Estadi Olímpic Lluís Companys; Referee: María Eugenia Gil Soriano

26 November 2023 10	Real Madrid	5–2	Sporting de Huelva	Madrid
14:00 CET (UTC+1)	del Castillo 37'; Carmona 39'; Raso 42'; Møller 63', 64'	Report	Isina 57'; Cienfu 90'	Stadium: Estadio Alfredo Di Stéfano; Referee: Elia María Martínez Martínez

9 December 2023 11	Real Madrid	1–3	Sevilla	Madrid
18:30 CET (UTC+1)	Møller 85'	Report	Hernández 51' (o.g.); Aparicio 90+4'; Gili 90+10'	Stadium: Estadio Alfredo Di Stéfano; Referee: Olatz Rivera Olmedo

17 December 2023 12	Levante Las Planas	0–2	Real Madrid	Sant Joan Despí
14:00 CET (UTC+1)		Report	Zornoza 17'; Carmona 43' (pen.)	Stadium: Municipal de Les Planes; Referee: Andrea Fernández Firvida

7 January 2024 13	Real Madrid	1–3	Madrid CFF	Madrid
18:00 CET (UTC+1)	Ivana 90+5'; Møller 90+9'	Report	Librán 90+1'	Stadium: Estadio Alfredo Di Stéfano; Referee: Zulema González González

27 January 2024 15	Athletic Club	0–1	Real Madrid	Lezama
18:30 CET (UTC+1)		Report	Feller 43'	Stadium: Lezama (Field 2); Referee: Paola Cebollada López

3 February 2024 16	Real Madrid	7–1	Valencia	Madrid
20:30 CET (UTC+1)	Caicedo 29'; Møller 38', 45', 53'; Bruun 65'; Feller 81'; Oroz 90+1'	Report	Marcos 56'	Stadium: Estadio Alfredo Di Stéfano; Referee: Ylenia Sánchez Miguel

11 February 2024 17	Real Betis	1–4	Real Madrid	Seville
14:00 CET (UTC+1)	Armengol 75'	Report	Møller 58'; Bruun 64'; del Castillo 66', 83'	Stadium: Ciudad Deportiva Luis del Sol; Referee: Elena Peláez Arnillas

14 February 2024 14	Atlético Madrid	1–1	Real Madrid	Alcalá de Henares
20:00 CEST (UTC+2)	Guijarro 5'	Report	Carmona 22' (pen.)	Stadium: Centro Deportivo Wanda Alcalá de Henares; Referee: Ainara Andrea Acevedo Dudley

18 February 2024 18	Real Madrid	2–1	Costa Adeje Tenerife	Madrid
16:00 CET (UTC+1)	Carmona 28' (pen.); Bruun 90+2'	Report	Babajide 55'	Stadium: Estadio Alfredo Di Stéfano; Referee: María Eugenia Gil Soriano

9 March 2024 19	Sevilla	0–1	Real Madrid	Seville
18:30 CET (UTC+1)		Report	Carmona 48'	Stadium: Estadio Jesús Navas; Referee: Amy Peñalver Pearce

16 March 2024 20	Real Madrid	1–0	Eibar	Madrid
20:00 CET (UTC+1)	Ivana 4'	Report		Stadium: Estadio Alfredo Di Stéfano; Referee: Beatriz Cuesta Arribas

24 March 2024 21	Real Madrid	0–3	Barcelona	Madrid
18:00 CET (UTC+1)		Report	Rolfö 10'; Bonmatí 55'; Graham Hansen 67'	Stadium: Estadio Alfredo Di Stéfano; Referee: Olatz Rivera Olmedo

30 March 2024 22	Villarreal	0–2	Real Madrid	Villarreal
19:00 CET (UTC+1)		Report	Feller 34', 56'	Stadium: Ciudad Deportiva Villarreal CF; Referee: Elena Peláez Arnillas

14 April 2024 23	Real Madrid	5–0	Granada	Madrid
19:00 CET (UTC+1)	Caicedo 27'; Pérez 29' (o.g.); Feller 53'; Bruun 66'; Abelleira 70'	Report		Stadium: Estadio Alfredo Di Stéfano; Referee: Ylenia Sánchez Miguel

20 April 2024 24	Levante	2–4	Real Madrid	Buñol
12:00 CET (UTC+1)	Nunes 5'; Baños 90+4'	Report	Zornoza 66'; Caicedo 72', 86'; Oroz 88'	Stadium: Ciudad Deportiva de Buñol; Referee: María Gloria Planes Terol

28 April 2024 25	Real Madrid	2–1	Levante Las Planas	Madrid
18:00 CET (UTC+1)	Raso 85'; Zornoza 90+8'	Report	Uribe 9'	Stadium: Estadio Alfredo Di Stéfano; Referee: Raquel Suárez González

5 May 2024 26	Madrid CFF	0–1	Real Madrid	Fuenlabrada
20:30 CET (UTC+1)		Report	Zornoza 7'	Stadium: Estadio Fernando Torres; Referee: Andrea Fernández Firvida

12 May 2024 27	Real Madrid	2–3	Atlético Madrid	Madrid
21:00 CET (UTC+1)	Møller 34'; Kathellen 70'	Report	Ana Vitória 37'; Ajibade 56'; Bøe Risa 76'	Stadium: Estadio Alfredo Di Stéfano; Referee: Marta Huerta de Aza

26 May 2024 28	Real Sociedad	1–2	Real Madrid	San Sebastián
16:30 CEST (UTC+2)	Marcos 37'	Report	Bruun 8'; del Castillo 30'	Stadium: Zubieta Facilities; Referee: Patricia Luna Varo

9 June 2024 29	Real Madrid	1–0	Athletic Bilbao	Madrid
18:30 CEST (UTC+2)	Comendador 69'	Report		Stadium: Estadio Alfredo Di Stéfano; Referee: Amy Peñalver Pearce

16 June 2024 30	Sporting de Huelva	1–4	Real Madrid	Huelva
19:00 CEST (UTC+2)	Hmírová 82'	Report	Carmona 32'; Bruun 42', 53'; Feller 75'	Stadium: Estadio Nuevo Colombino; Referee: Raquel Suárez González

=== Copa de la Reina ===
13 January 2024 Round of 16	Real Betis	0–5	Real Madrid	Seville
16:30 CEST (UTC+2)		Report	del Castillo 6'; Toletti 45+1' (pen.); Caicedo 70'; Møller 80'; Freja Olofsson 81'	Stadium: Ciudad Deportiva Luis del Sol; Referee: Elena Peláez Arnillas

8 February 2024 Quarter-final	Atlético Madrid	2–1	Real Madrid	Alcalá de Henares
21:00 CET (UTC+1)	Ludmila 37'; Eva Navarro 53'	Report	Caicedo 47'	Stadium: Centro Deportivo Wanda Alcalá de Henares; Referee: Beatriz Cuesta Arribas

=== Supercopa de España Femenina ===
17 January 2024 Semi-final	Barcelona	4–0	Real Madrid	Leganés
19:00 CET (UTC+1)	Caldentey 12', 39' (pen.); Paralluelo 15', 52'	Report		Stadium: Estadio Municipal de Butarque; Referee: Marta Huerta de Aza

=== UEFA Champions League ===
==== Second Qualifying Round ====
The second round draw was held on 15 September 2023.

11 October 2023 First leg	Real Madrid (Spain)	2–1	(Norway) Vålerenga	Madrid
20:00	Zornoza 4'; Gálvez 44'	Report	Rogic 27'	Stadium: Estadio Alfredo Di Stéfano; Attendance: 2,143; Referee: Sabina Bolić (Croatia)

18 October 2023 Second leg	Vålerenga (Norway)	0–3	(Spain) Real Madrid	Oslo
19:30		Report	Toletti 29'; Feller 68'; del Castillo 90+5'	Stadium: Intility Arena; Attendance: 6,341; Referee: Alina Peşu (Romania)

Real Madrid won 5–1 on aggregate.

==== Group stage ====
The group stage draw was held on 20 October 2023.

Pos	Team	Pld	W	D	L	GF	GA	GD	Pts	Qualification
1	(England) Chelsea	6	4	2	0	15	5	+10	14	Advance to quarter-finals
2	(Sweden) BK Häcken	6	3	2	1	6	5	+1	11	Advance to quarter-finals
3	(France) Paris FC	6	2	1	3	5	11	−6	7	
4	(Spain) Real Madrid	6	0	1	5	5	10	−5	1	

Source: UEFA
Rules for classification: Group stage tiebreakers

15 November 2023 1	(Spain) Real Madrid	2–2	(England) Chelsea	Madrid
21:00	Carmona 10', 79' (pen.)	Report	Charles 41'; Kerr 74'	Stadium: Estadio Alfredo Di Stéfano; Attendance: 2,913; Referee: Frida Klarlund (Denmark)

23 November 2023 2	BK Häcken (Sweden)	2–1	(Spain) Real Madrid	Gothenburg
18:45	Kafaji 59'; Kosola 76'	Report	Bruun 10'	Stadium: Bravida Arena; Attendance: 4,897; Referee: Ivana Projkovska (North Macedonia)

14 December 2023 3	Paris FC (France)	2–1	(Spain) Real Madrid	Paris
18:45	Dufour 4'; Thiney 6'	Report	Møller 53'	Stadium: Stade Sébastien Charléty, Attendance: 10,693; Referee: Maria Sole Ferrieri Caputi (Italy)

20 December 2023 4	Real Madrid (Spain)	0–1	(France) Paris FC	Madrid
21:00		Report	Thiney 79' (pen.)	Stadium: Estadio Alfredo Di Stéfano; Attendance: 1,596; Referee: Alina Peşu (Romania)

24 January 2024 5	Chelsea (England)	2–1	(Spain) Real Madrid	Fulham
21:00	Reiten 62' (pen.); Chavas 71' (o.g.)	Report	Athenea 69'	Stadium: Stamford Bridge; Attendance: 11,262; Referee: Catarina Campos (Portugal)

30 January 2024 6	Real Madrid (Spain)	0–1	(Sweden) BK Häcken	Madrid
18:45		Report	Kafaji 63'	Stadium: Estadio Alfredo Di Stéfano; Attendance: 862; Referee: Riem Hussein (Germany)

== Statistics ==
=== Squad statistics ===
As of last matchday.

No.	Pos	Nat	Player	Total		Liga F		Copa de la Reina		Supercopa de España		Champions League	
No.	Pos	Nat	Player	Apps	Goals	Apps	Goals	Apps	Goals	Apps	Goals	Apps	Goals
Goalkeepers
1	GK	(Spain) ESP	Misa Rodríguez	34	0	25	0	2	0	1	0	6	0
13	GK	(France) FRA	Mylène Chavas	7	0	5	0	0	0	0	0	2	0
Defenders
2	DF	(Mexico) MEX	Kenti Robles	20	0	9+6	0	0+1	0	0	0	4	0
4	DF	(Spain) ESP	Rocío Gálvez	25	2	20+1	1	0+1	0	0	0	3	1
5	DF	(Spain) ESP	Ivana Andrés	35	1	25	1	2	0	1	0	6+1	0
7	DF	(Spain) ESP	Olga Carmona	36	8	22+5	6	0+1	0	1	0	7	2
11	DF	(Spain) ESP	Oihane Hernández	30	0	18+2	0	2	0	1	0	4+3	0
14	DF	(Brazil) BRA	Kathellen	29	1	17+1	1	2	0	1	0	7+1	0
23	DF	(Denmark) DEN	Sofie Svava	25	0	10+8	0	2	0	0+1	0	2+2	0
50	DF	(Spain) ESP	María Valle	1	0	0+1	0	0	0	0	0	0	0
Midfielders
3	MF	(Spain) ESP	Teresa Abelleira	35	1	22+5	1	1	0	0	0	7	0
6	MF	(France) FRA	Sandie Toletti	32	4	22+2	2	2	1	1	0	4+1	1
8	MF	(Spain) ESP	Maite Oroz	34	5	7+17	5	0+2	0	0+1	0	3+4	0
10	MF	(Scotland) SCO	Caroline Weir	1	0	1	0	0	0	0	0	0	0
21	MF	(Spain) ESP	Claudia Zornoza	38	5	19+9	4	1	0	1	0	7+1	1
24	MF	(Sweden) SWE	Freja Olofsson	23	1	1+14	0	0+1	1	1	0	3+3	0
Forwards
9	FW	(Denmark) DEN	Signe Bruun	31	14	16+9	13	0+1	0	0	0	4+1	1
15	FW	(Australia) AUS	Hayley Raso	39	4	10+18	4	0+2	0	0+1	0	4+4	0
16	FW	(Denmark) DEN	Caroline Møller	31	11	17+6	9	2	1	0+1	0	4+1	1
17	FW	(Spain) ESP	Carla Camacho	4	0	0+3	0	0	0	0	0	0+1	0
18	FW	(Colombia) COL	Linda Caicedo	35	7	23+3	5	2	2	1	0	4+2	0
20	FW	(France) FRA	Naomie Feller	35	11	14+13	10	2	0	1	0	1+4	1
22	FW	(Spain) ESP	Athenea del Castillo	41	11	25+5	8	2	1	1	0	6+2	2
27	FW	(Spain) ESP	Olaya Rodríguez	9	0	1+5	0	0	0	0+1	0	0+2	0
46	FW	(Spain) ESP	Marisa García	6	0	1+2	0	0	0	0	0	0+3	0
48	FW	(Spain) ESP	Paula Comendador	4	1	0+3	1	0	0	0	0	0+1	0

=== Goals ===
As of last matchday.

Rank	No.	Pos.	Nat.	Player	Liga F	CDLR	Supercopa	UWCL	Total
1	10	FW	(Denmark)	Signe Bruun	13	–	–	1	14
2	16	FW	(Denmark)	Caroline Møller	9	1	–	1	11
2	20	FW	(France)	Naomie Feller	10	–	–	1	11
2	22	FW	(Spain)	Athenea del Castillo	8	1	–	2	11
5	7	DF	(Spain)	Olga Carmona	6	–	–	2	8
6	18	FW	(Colombia)	Linda Caicedo	5	2	–	–	7
7	8	MF	(Spain)	Maite Oroz	5	–	–	–	5
7	21	MF	(Spain)	Claudia Zornoza	4	–	–	1	5
9	6	MF	(France)	Sandie Toletti	2	1	–	1	4
9	15	FW	(Australia)	Hayley Raso	4	–	–	–	4
11	4	DF	(Spain)	Rocío Gálvez	1	–	–	1	2
11	5	DF	(Spain)	Ivana Andrés	2	–	–	–	2
13	3	MF	(Spain)	Teresa Abelleira	1	–	–	–	1
13	14	DF	(Brazil)	Kathellen	1	–	–	–	1
13	24	MF	(Sweden)	Freja Olofsson	–	1	–	–	1
13	48	FW	(Spain)	Paula Comendador	1	–	–	–	1
Own goals					2	0	0	0	2
Total					74	6	0	10	90
