= Yunquera de Henares =

Yunquera de Henares, Spain
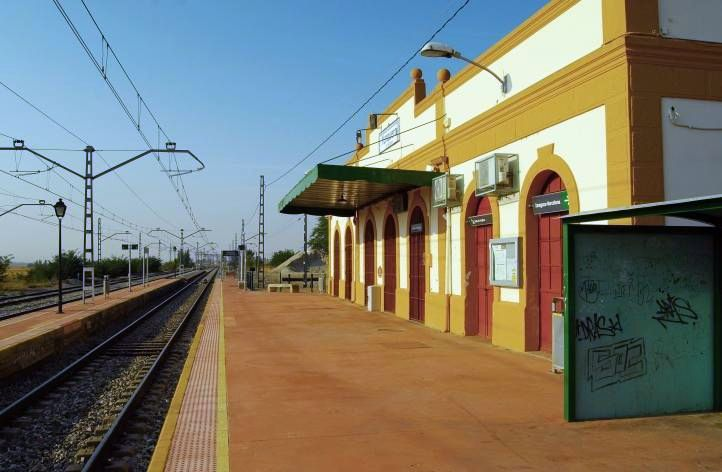

- Flag Coat of arms

- Location within Province of Guadalajara Location within Castilla-La Mancha Location within Spain
- Coordinates: 40°45′19″N 3°09′57″W
- Country: Spain
- Autonomous community: Castile-La Mancha
- Province: Guadalajara
- Municipality: Yunquera de Henares

Area
  - Total: 31.22 km^{2} (12.05 sq mi)
- Elevation: 693 m (2,274 ft)

Population (2025-01-01)
  - Total: 4,706
- Time zone: UTC+1 (CET)
  - Summer (DST): UTC+2 (CEST)
- Website: http://www.yunqueradehenares.com

Yunquera de Henares is a municipality in the province of Guadalajara, Castile-La Mancha, Spain. As of January 2016, the population is 3,835 people, of which about 51% are men and 49% are women. The municipality is located about 80 km northeast of Madrid.

== Religious Significance ==
Yunquera de Henares is a member of the Parish of San Pedro Apóstol (Saint Peter the Apostle) and is home to the Hermitage of the Farm, in which can be found the church's patron Virgin Mary, "Our Lady of the Farm." This devotion dates back to at least 1658, which is the oldest written record of the story. The tale is that a local shepherd watching over his sheep witnessed an apparition of the Virgin Mary, who spoke to him. The shepherd shared this with the town, who came to see the image of the Lady and brought it back to the village. The story tells that many sick people in Yunquera were miraculously healed upon seeing the image.

== Notable people ==
- Sheila García (born 1997), footballer for the Spain national team
