= Oihane Hernández =

Spanish footballer (born 2000)

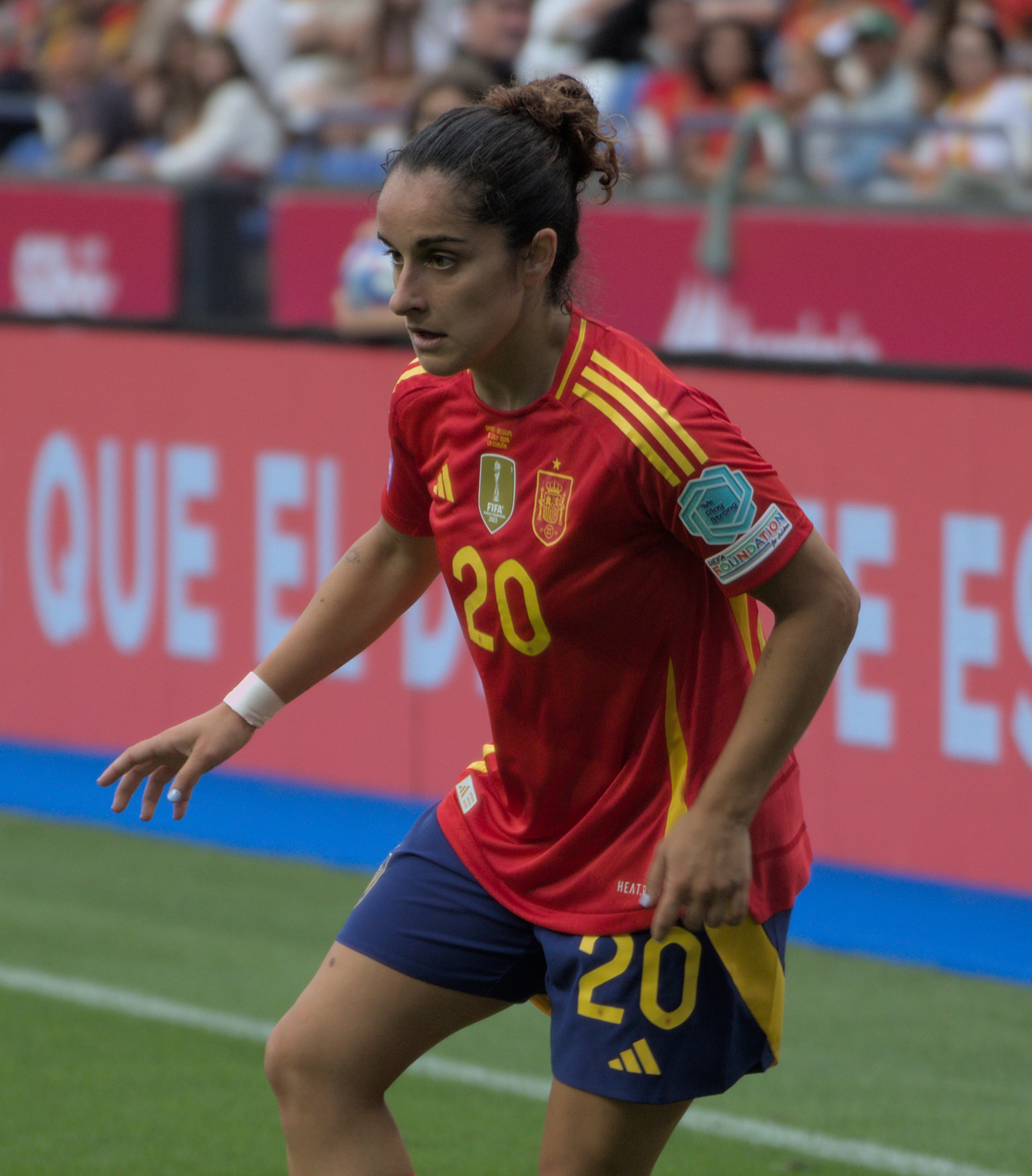
- Oihane playing for Spain, 2024

Personal information
- Full name: Oihane Hernández Zurbano
- Date of birth: 4 May 2000 (age 26)
- Place of birth: Sopela, Spain
- Height: 1.65 m (5 ft 5 in)
- Position: Right back

Team information
- Current team: Orlando Pride
- Number: 21

Youth career
- 2010–2015: Betiko Neskak

Senior career*
Years	Team	Apps	(Gls)
2015–2019	Athletic Club B	80	(9)
2019–2023	Athletic Club	103	(3)
2023–2025	Real Madrid	31	(0)
2025–	Orlando Pride	48	(0)

International career^{‡}
2016–2017	Spain U17	6	(0)
2017–2019	Spain U19	16	(0)
2022	Spain U23	1	(0)
2022–	Spain	27	(1)
Medal record
Women's football
Representing Spain
FIFA Women's World Cup
Winner	2023 Australia–New Zealand
UEFA Women's Nations League
Winner	2024 France–Netherlands–Spain
UEFA Women's Under-19 Championship
Winner	2018 Switzerland
- * Club domestic league appearances and goals as of 03:24, 8 November 2026 (UTC) ‡ National team caps and goals as of 01:31, 10 August 2024 (UTC)

Oihane Hernández Zurbano (born 4 May 2000) is a Spanish professional footballer who plays as a right back for the Orlando Pride in the National Women's Soccer League (NWSL) and the Spain national team. She has previously played in Liga F for Athletic Club and Real Madrid.

== Club career ==
=== Athletic Club ===
Oihane Hernández began her career in the youth team of Betiko Neskak, a club based in Erandio. In 2015 she was signed by Athletic Club and initially played for the Basque club's B team in the Segunda División. In the course of her fourth season in the reserve ranks, Oihane made her first-team debut in a league match against Atlético Madrid on 5 January 2019. Overall she made five appearances and one goal in the senior squad that season. Although Oihane started the 2019–20 season with the B team, she only played two games in the Segunda División before moving to the first team permanently. In 2020, she signed a new contract running until 2023.

Athletic reached the delayed semi-finals of the 2019–20 Copa de la Reina, losing to EdF Logroño on penalties. In the championship, the Basque women finished fifth. In August 2021, Oihane won the Basque Cup with Athletic; after beating SD Eibar 4–0 in the semifinals, they won the final 2–1 against Deportivo Alavés. Athletic had previously finished the Spanish championship in a disappointing eleventh place, and fared only slightly better in the two subsequent campaigns (seventh in 2021–22, tenth in 2022–23). They reached the Copa semi-finals again in 2023, but this time lost 4–0 to Real Madrid. By now established as a regular on the right flank, Oihane had made 109 competitive appearances, scoring three goals, for Athletic by the time of departing the club in the summer of 2023.

=== Real Madrid ===
Oihane signed for Real Madrid in July 2023. On 15 September, she made her debut for the club in a game against Valencia.

=== Orlando Pride ===
On 14 February 2025, Oihane transferred to NWSL club Orlando Pride, signing a two-year contract with a mutual option. She made her club debut on 12 April, coming on as a second-half substitute for Cori Dyke in a 1–0 victory over the Seattle Reign.

== International career ==
Oihane Hernández took part in the UEFA Development Tournament with Spain U16 in May 2016. A few months later she was in the squad for the U-17 World Cup and took third place with her selection in the final round. Oihane made three appearances over the course of the tournament. At the 2017 U-17 European Championship finals, she reached the final with Spain but lost this on penalties to Germany. She won her first title at the U-19 European Championship in 2018, this time the Iberians beat their German peers 1–0 in the final, and Oihane himself played in all five final round matches.

On 2 September 2022, Oihane made her Spain senior national team debut in the penultimate game of World Cup qualifiers against Hungary, when she came on as a 77th-minute substitute for Olga Carmona. A few days later she was in the starting XI against Ukraine.

== Career statistics ==
=== Club ===
As of 2 September 2026

Appearances and goals by club, season and competition
Club	Season	League			National cup (Note: Includes Copa de la Reina)		Continental		Other		Total	
Club	Season	Division	Apps	Goals	Apps	Goals	Apps	Goals	Apps	Goals	Apps	Goals
Athletic Club B	2015–16	Segunda División	24	3	—		—		—		24	3
Athletic Club B	2016–17	Segunda División	16	3	—		—		—		16	3
Athletic Club B	2017–18	Segunda División	24	3	—		—		—		24	3
Athletic Club B	2018–19	Segunda División	16	0	—		—		—		16	0
Athletic Club B	Total		80	9	—		—		—		80	9
Athletic Club	2018–19	Primera División / Liga F	5	1	0	0	—		—		5	1
Athletic Club	2019–20	Primera División / Liga F	17	0	3	0	—		—		20	0
Athletic Club	2020–21	Primera División / Liga F	33	1	0	0	—		—		33	1
Athletic Club	2021–22	Primera División / Liga F	23	0	1	0	—		—		24	0
Athletic Club	2022–23	Primera División / Liga F	25	1	2	0	—		—		27	1
Athletic Club	Total		103	3	6	0	—		—		109	3
Real Madrid	2023–24	Liga F	20	0	2	0	7 (Note: Includes UEFA Women's Champions League)	0	1 (Note: Appearances in Supercopa de España Femenina)	0	30	0
Real Madrid	2024–25	Liga F	11	0	1	0	6	1	0	0	18	1
Real Madrid	Total		31	0	3	0	13	1	1	0	48	1
Orlando Pride	2025	National Women's Soccer League	20	0	0	0	3 (Note: Appearances in CONCACAF W Champions Cup)	0	2 (Note: Appearances in NWSL Playoffs)	0	25	0
Orlando Pride	2026	National Women's Soccer League	23	0	—		—		0	0	23	0
Orlando Pride	Total		43	0	0	0	3	0	2	0	47	0
Career total			257	12	9	0	16	1	3	0	295	13

=== International ===
As of match played 9 August 2024

Appearances and goals by national team and year
National team	Year	Apps	Goals
Spain	2022	6	0
Spain	2023	11	1
Spain	2024	10	0
Total		27	1

Scores and results list Spain's goal tally first, score column indicates score after each Hernández goal.

List of international goals scored by Oihane Hernández
No.	Date	Venue	Opponent	Score	Result	Competition
1	31 October 2023	Letzigrund, Zürich, Switzerland	Switzerland	1–0	7–1	2023–24 UEFA Women's Nations League

== Honours ==
Spain U19

- U19 European Championship: 2018

Spain

- FIFA Women's World Cup: 2023
- UEFA Women's Nations League: 2023–24
