= María Valle =

Spanish footballer (born 2004)

Personal information
- Full name: María Valle López
- Date of birth: 14 November 2004 (age 21)
- Place of birth: Los Palacios y Villafranca, Spain
- Position: Defender

Team information
- Current team: Real Madrid B

Youth career
- 2018–2019: Sevilla

Senior career*
Years	Team	Apps	(Gls)
2019–2021	Real Betis B		
2020–2024	Real Betis	46	(1)
2024–	Real Madrid B	11	(0)
2024	Real Madrid	1	(0)
2024–2025	→ Real Sociedad (loan)	0	(0)

International career^{‡}
2021–	Spain U19	8	(1)
2021–	Spain U20	1	(0)
Medal record
Women's football
Representing Spain
UEFA Women's Under-19 Championship
Winner	2022 Czech Republic
- * Club domestic league appearances and goals as of 05:49, 23 June 2024 (UTC) ‡ National team caps and goals as of 05:49, 23 June 2024 (UTC)

María Valle López (born 14 November 2004) is a Spanish professional footballer who plays as a defender for Primera Federación club Real Madrid B.

== Club career ==
Valle started her career at Sevilla's academy.

On 9 July 2024, Real Sociedad announced that they had signed Valle.

== Career statistics ==
As of match played 14 June 2024

Appearances and goals by club, season and competition
Club	Season	League			Copa de la Reina		Continental		Other		Total	
Club	Season	Division	Apps	Goals	Apps	Goals	Apps	Goals	Apps	Goals	Apps	Goals
Real Betis	2020–21	Primera División	22	0	—		—		—		22	0
Real Betis	2021–22	Primera División	21	1	1	0	—		—		22	1
Real Betis	2022–23	Liga F	3	0	0	0	—		—		3	0
Real Betis	2023–24	Liga F	0	0	2	0	—		—		2	0
Real Betis	Total		46	1	3	0	—		—		49	1
Real Madrid B	2023–24	Segunda Federación	5	0	—		—		—		5	0
Real Madrid	2023–24	Primera División	1	0	0	0	0	0	0	0	1	0
Career total			52	1	3	0	0	0	0	0	55	1

== Honours ==
Spain U19

- UEFA Women's Under-19 Championship: 2022
