= Sandie Toletti =

French footballer (born 1995)

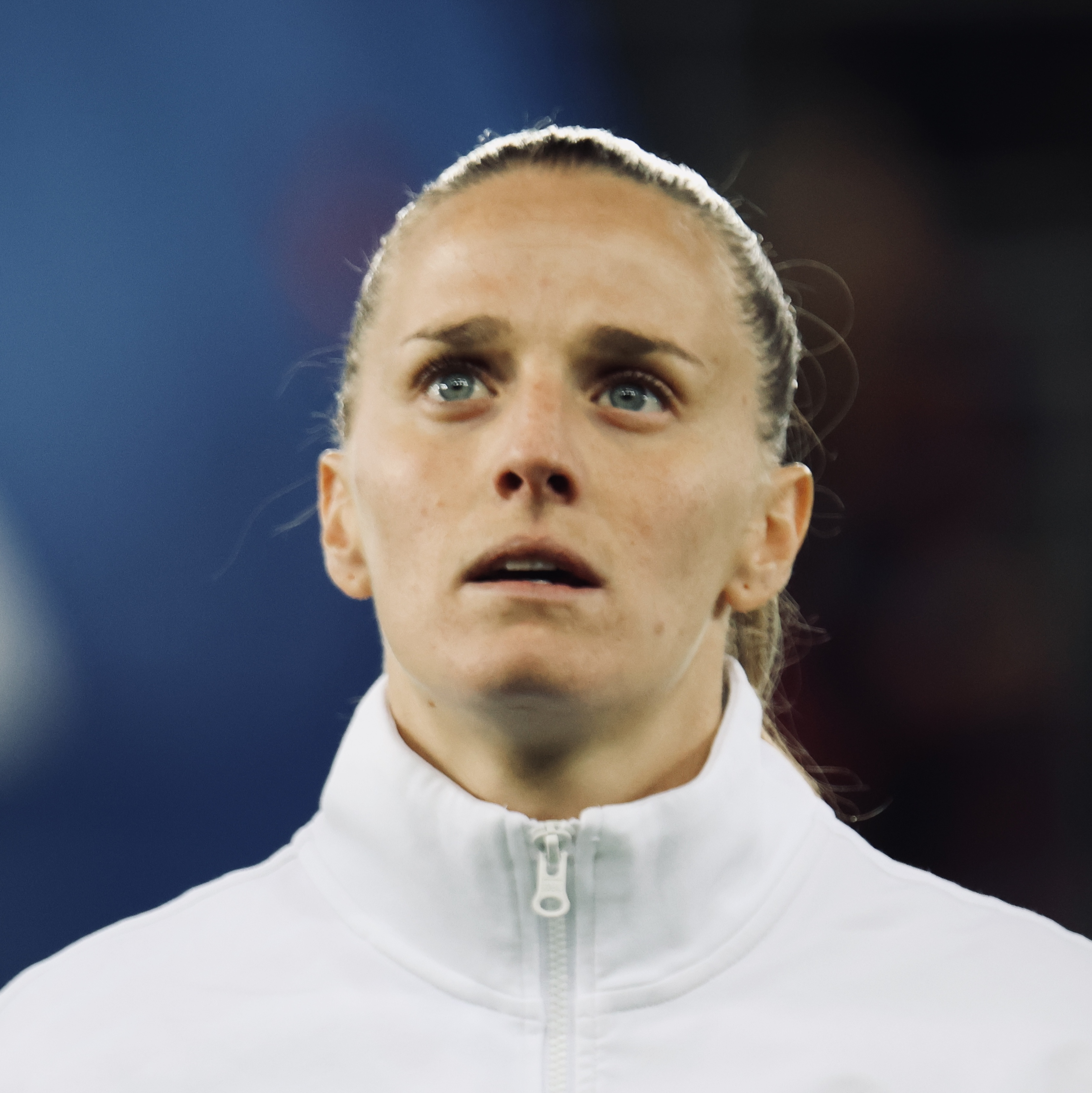
- Toletti with Real Madrid in 2023

Personal information
- Full name: Sandie Rose Toletti
- Date of birth: 13 July 1995 (age 31)
- Place of birth: Bagnols-sur-Cèze, France
- Height: 1.69 m (5 ft 7 in)
- Position: Midfielder

Team information
- Current team: Real Madrid
- Number: 6

Youth career
- 2001–2008: Sporting Club Cavillargues
- 2008–2009: FC Bagnols Pont
- 2010–2013: Montpellier

Senior career*
Years	Team	Apps	(Gls)
2013–2020	Montpellier	127	(14)
2020–2022	Levante	53	(10)
2022–	Real Madrid	88	(9)

International career
2010–2012	France U17	34	(12)
2013–2014	France U19	19	(10)
2014	France U20	6	(0)
2018	France U23	4	(4)
2013–2025	France	72	(4)
Medal record
Women's football
Representing France
UEFA Women's Nations League
Runner-up	2024
FIFA U-20 Women's World Cup
Third place	2014 Canada
UEFA Women's Under-19 Championship
Winner	2013 Wales
FIFA U-17 Women's World Cup
Winner	2012 Azerbaijan
UEFA Women's Under-17 Championship
Runner-up	2012 Switzerland
Runner-up	2011 Switzerland
- * Club domestic league appearances and goals as of 19:51, 31 August 2026 (UTC)

Sandie Rose Toletti (born 13 July 1995) is a French professional footballer who plays as a midfielder for Liga F club Real Madrid.

== Club career ==
A playmaking midfielder, Toletti joined Montpellier in 2010 and broke into the first team in 2013.

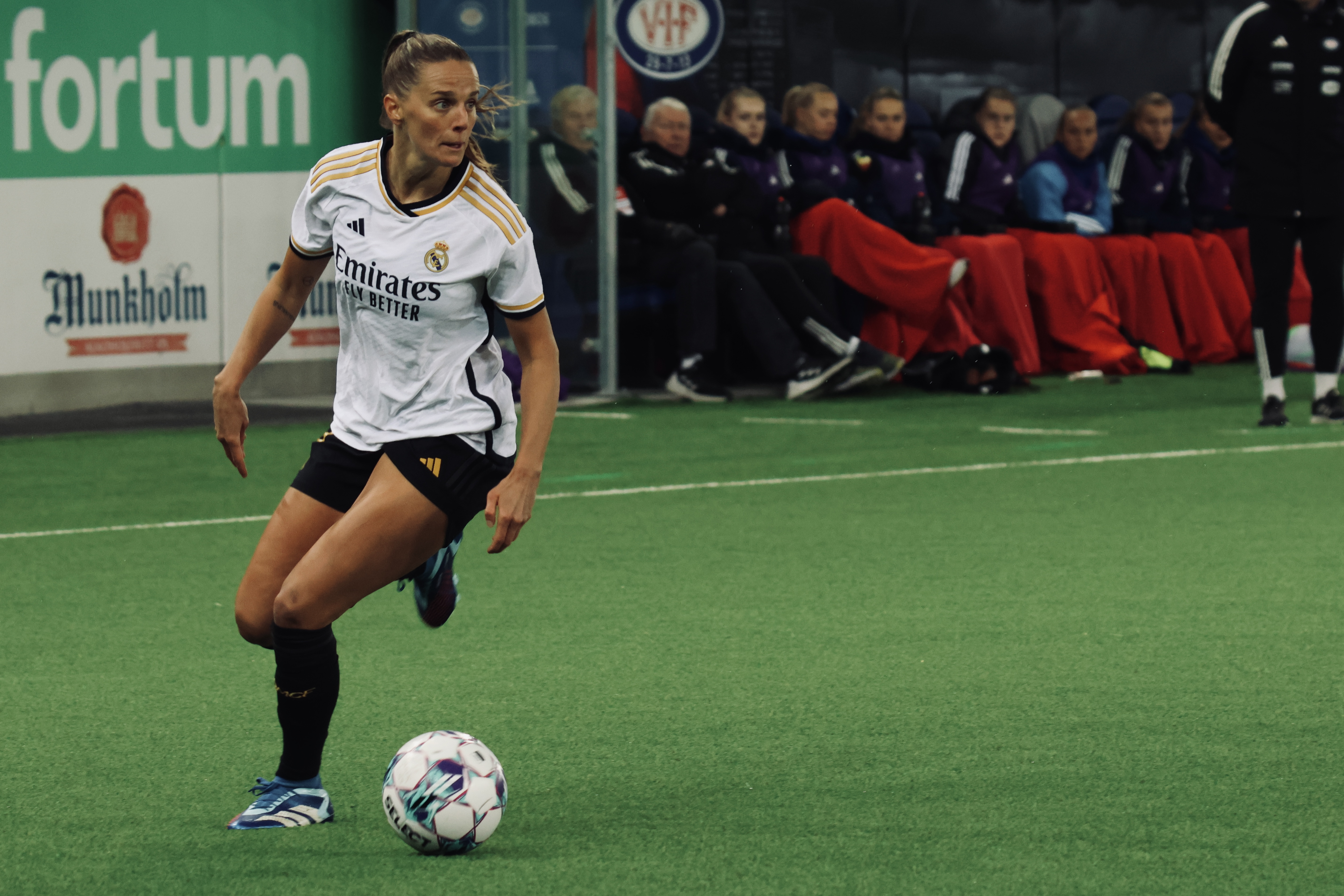
Toletti with Real Madrid in 2023

On 3 August 2022, Toletti's signing was announced at Real Madrid. Toletti quickly became an important player for Real Madrid, regularly featuring in the starting lineup. She has made over 100 appearances for the club.

== International career ==
With the French under-17 team, Toletti played in the 2012 UEFA Under-17 Championship where France lost a penalty shootout in the final to Germany. She was named UEFA's Golden Player for the tournament. She won FIFA U17 World Championship with France later that year, defeating North Korea in the final after a penalty shootout. At the 2013 UEFA Under-19 Championship, Toletti was UEFA's Golden Player again. In the final she scored France's first goal in their 2–0 extra time win over England.

In October 2013 she made her senior France debut in a 6–0 win over Poland. She was called up to the France squad for the UEFA Euro 2017. On 30 May 2022, she was called up to the France squad for the UEFA Euro 2022.

Toletti was called up to the France squad for the 2023 FIFA World Cup. In July 2024, she was named to France's squad for the 2024 Olympics. On 13 October 2025, she announced her retirement from international football.

== Career statistics ==
=== Club ===
As of match played 18 May 2025

Appearances and goals by club, season and competition
Club	Season	League			National cup (Note: Includes Coupe de France, Copa de la Reina)		Continental		Other		Total	
Club	Season	Division	Apps	Goals	Apps	Goals	Apps	Goals	Apps	Goals	Apps	Goals
Montpellier	2012–13	D1F	0	0	1	0	—		—		1	0
Montpellier	2013–14	D1F	22	1	1	0	—		—		23	1
Montpellier	2014–15	D1F	20	3	5	0	—		—		25	3
Montpellier	2015–16	D1F	18	0	3	1	—		—		21	1
Montpellier	2016–17	D1F	20	4	2	0	—		—		22	4
Montpellier	2017–18	D1F	15	3	3	0	6 (Note: Appearances in UEFA Women's Champions League)	1	—		24	4
Montpellier	2018–19	D1F	17	2	1	0	—		—		18	2
Montpellier	2019–20	D1F	15	1	3	1	—		—		18	2
Montpellier	Total		127	14	19	2	6	1	—		152	17
Levante	2020–21	Primera División	28	6	3	0	—		2 (Note: Appearance(s) in Supercopa de España)	0	33	6
Levante	2021–22	Primera División	25	4	2	0	4	2	0	0	31	6
Levante	Total		53	10	5	0	4	2	2	0	64	12
Real Madrid	2022–23	Liga F	23	2	3	2	10	0	0	0	36	4
Real Madrid	2023–24	Liga F	24	2	2	1	5	1	1	0	32	4
Real Madrid	2024–25	Liga F	22	2	4	1	8	2	2	0	36	5
Real Madrid	Total		69	6	9	4	23	3	3	0	104	13
Career total			249	28	33	6	33	5	5	0	320	42

=== International ===
As of match played 13 July 2025

Appearances and goals by national team and year
National team	Year	Apps	Goals
France	2013	2	0
France	2014	1	0
France	2015	1	0
France	2016	4	0
France	2017	5	0
France	2021	9	1
France	2022	14	1
France	2023	14	1
France	2024	12	0
France	2025	10	1
Total		72	4

Scores and results list France's goal tally first, score column indicates score after each Toletti goal.

List of international goals scored by Sandie Toletti
No.	Date	Venue	Opponent	Score	Result	Competition
1	22 October 2021	Stade Dominique Duvauchelle, Créteil, France	Estonia	5–0	11–0	2023 FIFA Women's World Cup qualification
2	1 July 2022	Stade de la Source, Orléans, France	Vietnam	3–0	7–0	Friendly
3	18 February 2023	Stade Raymond Kopa, Angers, France	Uruguay	4–1	5–1	2023 Tournoi de France
4	13 July 2025	St. Jakob-Park, Basel, Switzerland	Netherlands	1–0	5–2	UEFA Women's Euro 2025

== Honours ==
France U19

- UEFA Women's Under-19 Championship: 2013

France U17

- FIFA U-17 Women's World Cup: 2012

Individual

- UEFA Women's Under-17 Championship: Golden Player 2012
- UEFA Women's Under-19 Championship: Golden Player 2013
