= Laia López =

Spanish footballer (born 2007)

Personal information
- Full name: Laia López de la Morena
- Date of birth: 29 January 2007 (age 19)
- Place of birth: Madrid, Spain
- Height: 1.78 m (5 ft 10 in)
- Position: Goalkeeper

Team information
- Current team: Real Madrid
- Number: 13

Youth career
- 2014–2018: Atlético Chopera
- 2018–2022: Madrid CFF
- 2022–2023: Real Madrid

Senior career*
Years	Team	Apps	(Gls)
2022	Madrid CFF B	7	(0)
2023–2026	Real Madrid B	35	(0)
2025–	Real Madrid	2	(0)

International career
2022–2024	Spain U17	23	(0)
2024–	Spain U19	10	(0)
Medal record
Women's football
Representing Spain
FIFA U-20 Women's World Cup
Winner	2026 Poland
UEFA Women's Under-19 Championship
Winner	2025 Poland
Winner	2026 Bosnia and Herzegovina
UEFA Women's Under-17 Championship
Winner	2024 Sweden
FIFA U-17 Women's World Cup
Runner-up	2024 Dominican Republic
- * Club domestic league appearances and goals as of 6 November 2025

Laia López de la Morena (born 27 January 2007) is a Spanish professional footballer who plays as a goalkeeper for Liga F club Real Madrid.

== Club career ==
At the age of seven, Laia López began playing football with Atlético Chopera in Alcobendas, near Madrid. At eleven, she joined Madrid CFF, where she progressed through several youth categories before making her debut with the club's B team in April 2022 in a Primera Federación match against Córdoba CF.

In 2022, at the age of fifteen, López signed for Real Madrid, initially joining the club's youth academy. In September 2023, she made her debut with Real Madrid Femenino B, which competed in the Segunda Federación at the time. She made sixteen appearances during the 2023–24 season and helped the team earn promotion to the Primera Federación. In 2024, she also won the Copa Juvenil with the club's youth team.

On 11 May 2025, López made her first-team debut for Real Madrid in the Liga F in a match against Tenerife.

On 17 June 2026, López was promoted to the first team, signing a contract until 2030.

== International career ==
López made her debut for the Spain under-17 national team on 25 September 2022 during the qualification campaign for the 2023 UEFA Women's Under-17 Championship. At the final tournament, Spain reached the final but were defeated 3–2 by France. López featured once, appearing in the last match of the group stage.

The following year, she was again included in Spain's squad for the 2024 UEFA Women's Under-17 Championship, where Spain won the title after defeating England 4–0 in the final. This time López served as the team's first-choice goalkeeper, playing in all matches except the third group-stage fixture. A few months later, she was part of the national team in the 2024 FIFA U-17 Women's World Cup, where Spain finished as runners-up after losing 4–3 on penalties to North Korea in the final. López started in five of Spain's six matches in the tournament.

She made her debut for the Spain under-19 team on 27 November 2024 during the qualifiers for the 2025 UEFA Women's Under-19 Championship. In June 2025, Spain won the European title with a 4–0 victory over France in the final. López played four matches during the tournament, including the final, and kept a clean sheet in all of them.

== Honours ==
Real Madrid B

- Segunda Federacion: 2023–24

Spain U17

- UEFA Women's Under-17 Championship: 2024
- FIFA U-17 Women's World Cup runner-up: 2024

Spain U19

- UEFA Women's Under-19 Championship: 2025, 2026

Spain U20

- FIFA U-20 Women's World Cup: 2026

Individual

- UEFA Women's Under-17 Championship Team of the Tournament: 2024
- FIFA U-20 Women's World Cup Golden Glove: 2026
