= Maëlle Lakrar =

French footballer (born 2000)

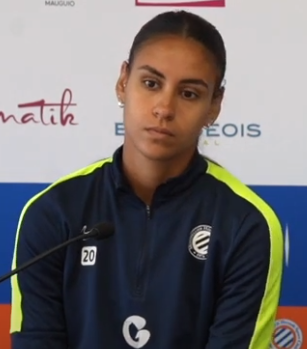
- Lakrar in 2024

Personal information
- Full name: Maëlle Ourida Louisette Lakrar
- Date of birth: 27 May 2000 (age 26)
- Place of birth: Orange, France
- Height: 1.70 m (5 ft 7 in)
- Position: Defender

Team information
- Current team: Real Madrid
- Number: 23

Youth career
- 2006–2015: Salon BAF

Senior career*
Years	Team	Apps	(Gls)
2015–2018	Marseille	50	(1)
2018–2024	Montpellier	96	(3)
2024–	Real Madrid	45	(4)

International career^{‡}
2016	France U16	10	(0)
2016–2017	France U17	12	(5)
2017–2019	France U19	21	(5)
2017–2020	France U20	14	(1)
2021–2022	France U23	5	(1)
2023–	France	41	(3)
Medal record
Women's football
Representing France
UEFA Women's Nations League
Runner-up	2024
Third place	2025
UEFA Women's Under-19 Championship
Winner	2019 Scotland
- * Club domestic league appearances and goals as of 4 October 2026 ‡ National team caps and goals as of 10 October 2026

Maëlle Ourida Louisette Lakrar (born 27 May 2000) is a French professional footballer who plays as a defender for Liga F club Real Madrid and the France national team.

== Club career ==
A former youth academy player of Salon BAF, Lakrar joined Division 2 Féminine club Marseille in August 2015 at the age of fifteen.

In July 2018, she moved to Montpellier.

On 4 July 2024, Lakrar joined Liga F club Real Madrid. She quickly established herself as an important player for Real Madrid, making 41 appearances, scoring four goals, and keeping 12 clean sheets in all competitions during her debut season at the club. She also renewed her contract with Real Madrid until 2028.

== International career ==
Lakrar has represented France at different youth levels. She was part of the France squad at the 2018 FIFA U-20 Women's World Cup. She was part of the France under-19 squad which won the 2019 UEFA Women's Under-19 Championship. For her performances, she was named in the Team of the Tournament.

In February 2023, Lakrar received her first call-up to the senior team for the 2023 Tournoi de France. She made her debut on 18 February 2023 in a 5–1 win against Uruguay.

On 6 June 2023, Lakrar was named in the 26-player preliminary squad for the 2023 FIFA Women's World Cup. She was also named in the final 23-player squad on 4 July 2023. Lakrar scored her first international goals against Republic of Ireland on 6 July 2023, scoring in the 45th+1st minute and the 61st minute. She would later score in the World Cup against Panama on 2 August 2023, scoring in the 21st minute.

Lakrar was part of the France squad that were runners-up in the 2023–24 UEFA Women's Nations League. In July 2024, she was named in France's squad for the 2024 Olympics. In June 2025, she was named in the squad for the UEFA Women's Euro 2025.

== Career statistics ==
=== Club ===
As of match played 30 March 2025

Appearances and goals by club, season and competition
Club	Season	League			National cup (Note: Includes Coupe de France Féminine, Copa de la Reina)		Continental		Other		Total	
Club	Season	Division	Apps	Goals	Apps	Goals	Apps	Goals	Apps	Goals	Apps	Goals
Marseille	2015–16	D2F	20	0	0	0	—		—		20	0
Marseille	2016–17	D1F	11	0	1	0	—		—		12	0
Marseille	2017–18	D1F	19	1	2	0	—		—		21	1
Marseille	Total		50	1	3	0	0	0	0	0	53	1
Montpellier	2018–19	D1F	15	0	1	0	—		—		16	0
Montpellier	2019–20	D1F	7	0	2	0	—		—		9	0
Montpellier	2020–21	D1F	15	0	1	1	—		—		16	1
Montpellier	2021–22	D1F	18	1	2	1	—		—		20	2
Montpellier	2022–23	D1F	22	1	2	1	—		—		24	2
Montpellier	2023–24	D1F	19	1	1	0	—		—		20	1
Montpellier	Total		96	3	9	3	0	0	0	0	105	6
Real Madrid	2024–25	Liga F	21	4	4	0	9 (Note: Appearances in UEFA Women's Champions League)	0	2 (Note: Appearances in Supercopa de España Femenina)	0	36	4
Career total			167	8	16	3	9	0	2	0	194	11

=== International ===
As of match played 10 October 2026

Appearances and goals by national team and year
National team	Year	Apps	Goals
France	2023	10	3
France	2024	14	0
France	2025	11	0
France	2026	6	0
Total		41	3

Scores and results list France's goal tally first, score column indicates score after each Lakrar goal.

List of international goals scored by Maëlle Lakrar
No.	Date	Venue	Opponent	Score	Result	Competition
1	6 July 2023	Tallaght Stadium, Dublin, Republic of Ireland	Republic of Ireland	1–0	3–0	Friendly
2	6 July 2023	Tallaght Stadium, Dublin, Republic of Ireland	Republic of Ireland	3–0	3–0	Friendly
3	2 August 2023	Sydney Football Stadium, Sydney, Australia	Panama	1–1	6–3	2023 FIFA Women's World Cup

== Honours ==
Marseille

- Division 2 Féminine: 2015–16

France U19

- UEFA Women's Under-19 Championship: 2019

France

- UEFA Women's Nations League runners-up: 2023–24

Individual

- UEFA Women's Under-17 Championship team of the tournament: 2017
- UEFA Women's Under-19 Championship team of the tournament: 2019
- Primera División Team of the Year: 2024–25
