= Sheila García =

Spanish footballer (born 1997)

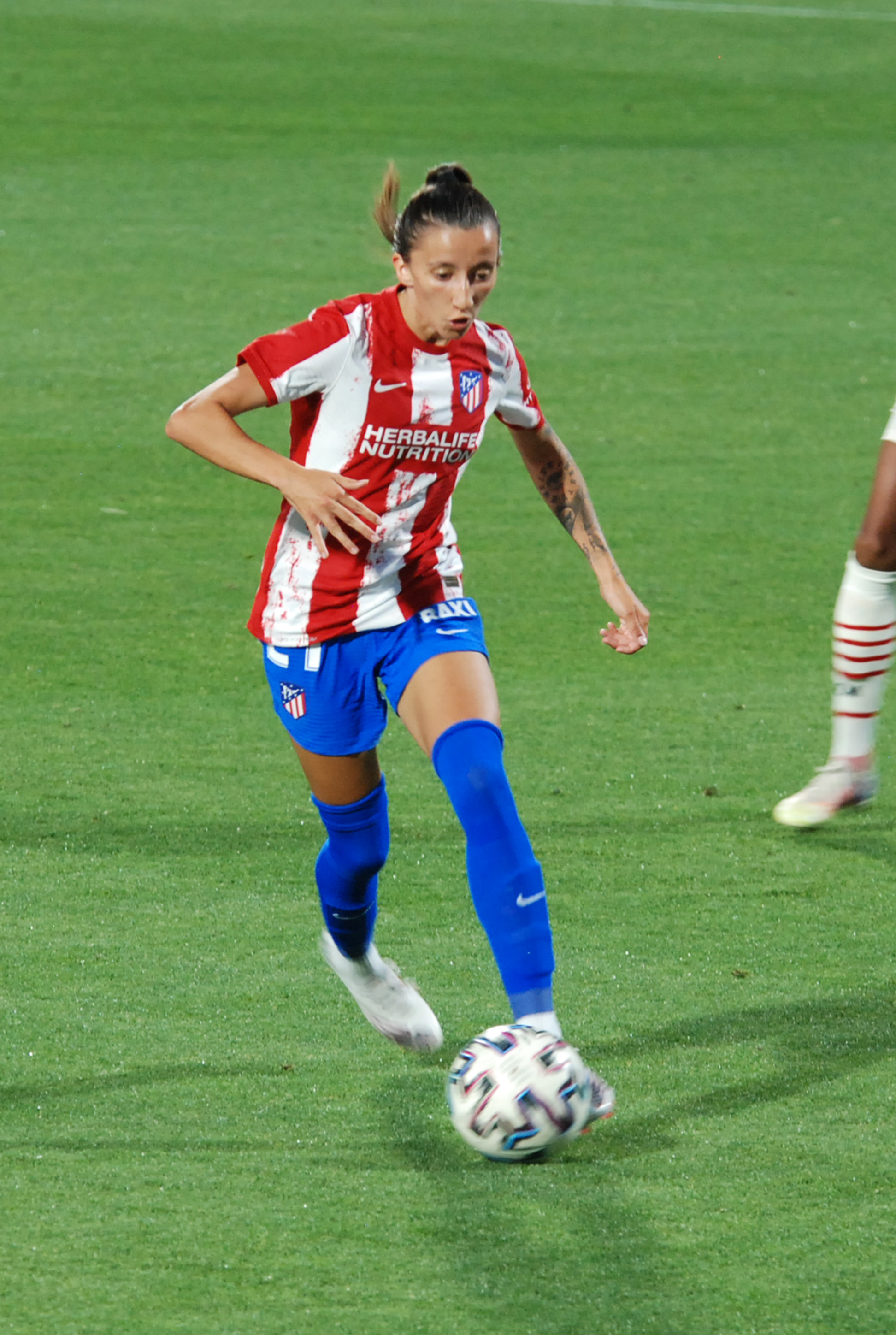
- García with Atlético Madrid in 2021

Personal information
- Full name: Sheila García Gómez
- Date of birth: 15 March 1997 (age 29)
- Place of birth: Yunquera de Henares, Spain
- Height: 1.62 m (5 ft 4 in)
- Positions: Right back; forward

Team information
- Current team: Inter Milan

Senior career*
| Years | Team | Apps | (Gls) |
| 2011–2016 | Dínamo Guadalajara | | |
| 2016–2021 | Rayo Vallecano | 135 | (20) |
| 2021–2024 | Atlético Madrid | 69 | (7) |
| 2024–2026 | Real Madrid | 46 | (1) |
| 2026– | Inter Milan | 0 | (0) |

International career
| 2019–2025 | Spain | 23 | (1) |
Medal record
Women's football
Representing Spain
UEFA Women's Nations League
| Winner | 2024 France–Netherlands–Spain |
- * Club domestic league appearances and goals as of 19:48, 10 May 2026 (UTC)

Sheila García Gómez (born 15 March 1997) is a Spanish professional footballer who plays as a right back for Serie A club Inter Milan and the Spain national team.

== Club career ==
Sheila began playing club football with Dinamo Guadalajara, and was awarded the 2015 Golden Ball as the best player from Castilla-La Mancha in the Spanish national league. Sheila moved to Liga F side Rayo Vallecano where she was the club's most important player during the 2018–19 season.

On 9 July 2024, she signed for Real Madrid. She made 36 appearances and scored one goal in all competitions for Real Madrid during her debut season.

On 12 July 2026 she signed a three-year contract with Serie A club Inter Milan until 30 June 2029.

== International career ==
Sheila missed participating in the 2023 FIFA World Cup finals with Spain through injury.

== Career statistics ==
=== Club ===
As of match played 15 June 2024

Appearances and goals by club, season and competition
| Club | Season | League | | | Cup (Note: Includes the Copa de la Reina de Fútbol) | | Europe (Note: Includes the UEFA Women's Champions League) | | Other (Note: Includes the Supercopa de España Femenina) | | Total | |
| Club | Season | Division | Apps | Goals | Apps | Goals | Apps | Goals | Apps | Goals | Apps | Goals |
|---|---|---|---|---|---|---|---|---|---|---|---|---|
| Rayo Vallecano Femenino | 2016–17 | Primera División | 30 | 6 | 1 | 0 | — | | — | | 31 | 6 |
| Rayo Vallecano Femenino | 2017–18 | Primera División | 27 | 5 | — | | — | | — | | 27 | 5 |
| Rayo Vallecano Femenino | 2018–19 | Primera División | 28 | 2 | 1 | 0 | — | | — | | 29 | 2 |
| Rayo Vallecano Femenino | 2019–20 | Primera División | 20 | 3 | 0 | 0 | — | | — | | 20 | 3 |
| Rayo Vallecano Femenino | 2020–21 | Primera División | 30 | 4 | — | | — | | — | | 20 | 3 |
| Rayo Vallecano Femenino | Total | | 135 | 20 | 2 | 0 | — | | — | | 137 | 20 |
| Atlético Madrid | 2021–22 | Primera División | 28 | 3 | 0 | 0 | — | | 2 | 0 | 30 | 3 |
| Atlético Madrid | 2022–23 | Liga F | 22 | 4 | 2 | 1 | — | | — | | 24 | 5 |
| Atlético Madrid | 2023–24 | Liga F | 19 | 0 | 4 | 1 | — | | 1 | 0 | 24 | 1 |
| Atlético Madrid | Total | | 69 | 7 | 6 | 2 | — | | 3 | 0 | 78 | 9 |
| Real Madrid | 2024–25 | Liga F | 0 | 0 | 0 | 0 | 0 | 0 | 0 | 0 | 0 | 0 |
| Career Total | | | 204 | 27 | 8 | 2 | 0 | 0 | 3 | 0 | 215 | 29 |

=== International ===
As of match played 21 February 2025

Appearances and goals by national team and year
| National team | Year | Apps | Goals |
|---|---|---|---|
| Spain | 2019 | 1 | 0 |
| Spain | 2020 | 2 | 0 |
| Spain | 2021 | 0 | 0 |
| Spain | 2022 | 10 | 0 |
| Spain | 2023 | 5 | 0 |
| Spain | 2024 | 1 | 1 |
| Spain | 2025 | 1 | 0 |
| Total | | 21 | 1 |

Scores and results list Spain's goal tally first, score column indicates score after each García goal.

List of international goals scored by Sheila García
| No. | Date | Venue | Opponent | Score | Result | Competition |
|---|---|---|---|---|---|---|
| 1. | 5 April 2024 | Den Dreef, Leuven, Belgium | Belgium | 6–0 | 7–0 | UEFA Women's Euro 2025 qualifying |

== Honours ==
Atlético Madrid

- Copa de la Reina: 2022–23

Spain

- UEFA Women's Nations League: 2023–24

== Personal life ==
Sheila married Carlota Castellanos on 26 June 2026.
