= Olga Carmona =

Spanish footballer (born 2000)

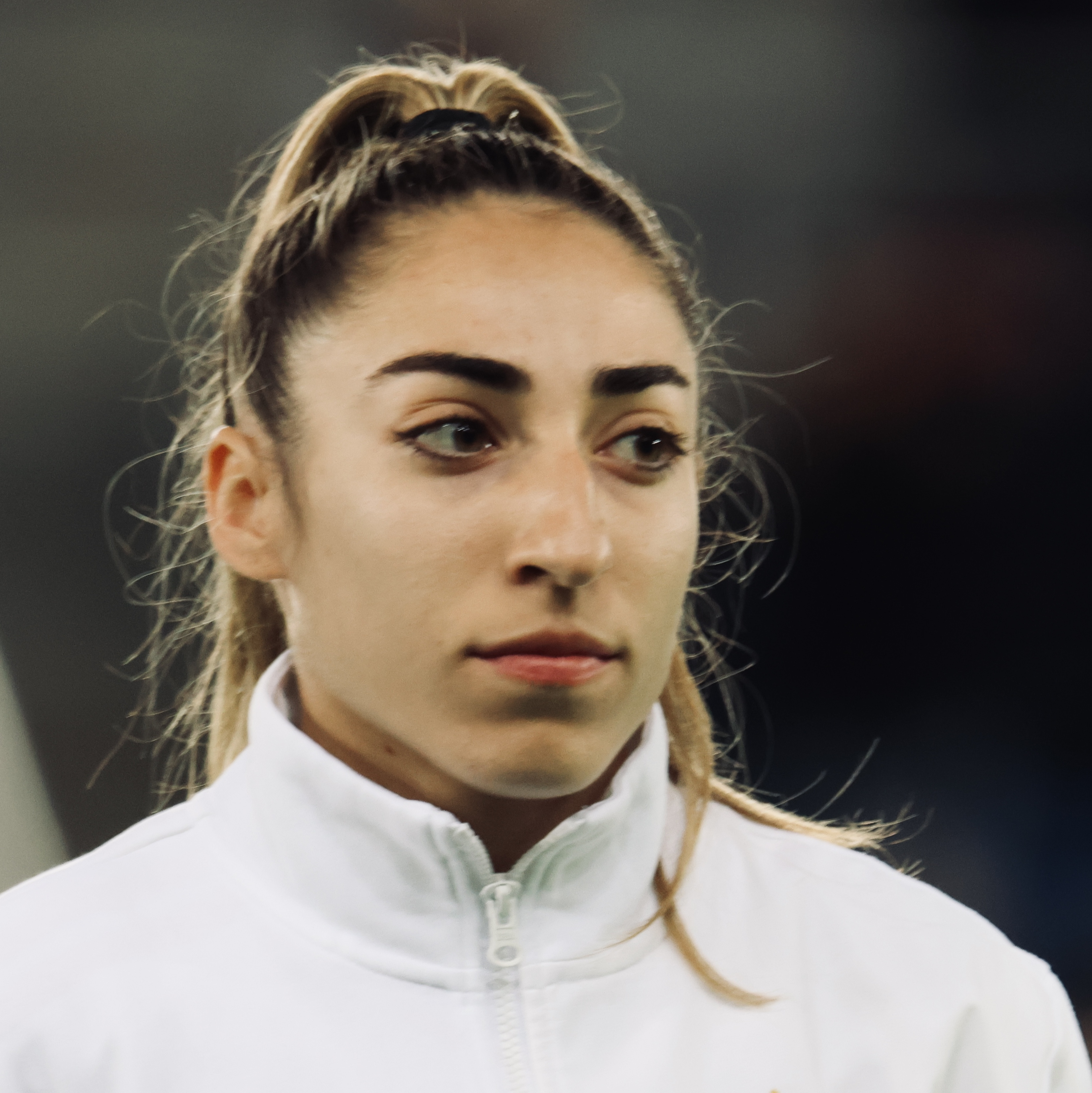
- Carmona with Real Madrid in 2023

Personal information
- Full name: Olga Carmona García
- Date of birth: 12 June 2000 (age 26)
- Place of birth: Seville, Spain
- Height: 1.59 m (5 ft 3 in)
- Positions: Left back; wing-back

Team information
- Current team: Paris Saint-Germain
- Number: 77

Youth career
- 2006–2007: Sevilla Este
- 2007–2017: Sevilla

Senior career*
Years	Team	Apps	(Gls)
2017–2020	Sevilla	75	(7)
2020–2025	Real Madrid	135	(21)
2025–	Paris Saint-Germain	19	(1)

International career^{‡}
2017–2019	Spain U19	18	(7)
2021	Spain U23	2	(0)
2021–	Spain	70	(3)
Medal record
Women's football
Representing Spain
FIFA Women's World Cup
Winner	2023 Australia–New Zealand
UEFA Women's Championship
Runner-up	2025 Switzerland
UEFA Women's Nations League
Winner	2024 France–Netherlands–Spain
Winner	2025 France–Germany–Spain–Sweden
UEFA Women's Under-19 Championship
Winner	2018 Switzerland
- * Club domestic league appearances and goals as of 09:03, 22 October 2026 (UTC) ‡ National team caps and goals as of 09:03, 22 October 2026 (UTC)

Olga Carmona García (born 12 June 2000) is a Spanish professional footballer who plays as a left back for Première Ligue club Paris Saint-Germain and the Spain national team. She played for Sevilla before joining Real Madrid in 2020. Carmona was Real Madrid's captain until 2025 when she signed for Paris Saint-Germain.

== Club career ==
Born in Seville, Andalusia, Carmona began her football career at the age of six with Sevilla Este. In Carmona's first professional season, she contributed with five goals in 25 matches as Sevilla finished 12th. In 2007, she moved to the youth team of Sevilla FC, where she was to spend nine years. For the 2016–17 season, Carmona made it into the first team that was playing in the Segunda División, the second division in Spain at the time. She managed with her team in her first season promotion to the Primera División. While her club landed in the lower mid-table of the league for the following three seasons, Carmona reached the semi-finals of both 2018–19 and 2019–20 domestic cups, in which Sevilla were defeated by eventual winners Real Sociedad and FC Barcelona.

In the summer of 2020, Carmona signed for Real Madrid's newly formed women's football section where she served as a captain and made a record 186 appearances, scoring 28 goals. Carmona opted not to renew her contract, seeking a fresh challenge.

On 18 June 2025, Paris Saint-Germain announced the signing of Carmona on a three-year contract, running until 2028. This marked the end of her five season spell at Real Madrid.

== International career ==
Carmona won the 2018 European Championship with the U-19 national team by beating Germany 1–0 in the final. She herself contributed four goals in ten games in qualifying and the finals to win the title. A year later, she was again with the U-19 in the finals of the European Championship, where her team lost 1–3 after extra time in the semifinals against France.

On 13 April 2021, Carmona made her senior team debut in a friendly match against Mexico. She played a critical role in Spain’s World Cup championship in 2023.

In 2023, at 23 years of age, Carmona played a key role in Spain's victory in the FIFA World Cup, eventually being selected as captain of the Spain squad in both the team's semi-final and the final and scoring decisive goals in each of the two matches. In the semi-final against Sweden on 15 August, Carmona helped her team achieve a 2–1 victory by scoring the decisive goal from a precise long-range shot. Five days later, during the 29th minute of the Final against England, she scored the only goal as Spain went on to win 1–0 to claim the trophy. Carmona was also named player of the match in the final.

In October 2023, Carmona was confirmed as a part of Spain's leadership and captaincy team.

On 10 June 2025, Carmona was called up to the Spain squad for the UEFA Women's Euro 2025.

== Personal life ==
Carmona's older brother, Fran Carmona, is also a footballer and plays as a defender for Ourense CF.

Growing up, Carmona's parents insisted that she should not play football, instead steering her towards swimming, tennis and sevillana dancing; they eventually relented when she would not change her mind. Carmona's father died after a prolonged illness two days before the 2023 FIFA Women's World Cup final in which she scored the winning goal. Her mother and brothers were present in Australia to watch her play, and she learned of her father's death after Spain's victory celebrations.

As of 2023, in addition to her professional responsibilities with Real Madrid, Carmona was in the process of completing her undergraduate studies for a degree in Physical Activity and Sports Sciences.

== Career statistics ==
=== Club ===
As of match played 4 October 2026

Appearances and goals by club, season and competition
Club	Season	League			National cup (Note: Includes Copa de la Reina, Coupe de France Féminine)		Continental		Other		Total	
Club	Season	Division	Apps	Goals	Apps	Goals	Apps	Goals	Apps	Goals	Apps	Goals
Sevilla	2017–18	Primera División	25	5	0	0	—		—		25	5
Sevilla	2018–19	Primera División	30	2	3	0	—		—		33	2
Sevilla	2019–20	Primera División	20	0	2	0	—		—		22	0
Sevilla	Total		75	7	5	0	—		—		80	7
Real Madrid	2020–21	Primera División	28	5	1	0	—		—		29	5
Real Madrid	2021–22	Primera División	28	2	3	1	8	3 (Note: Appearance(s) in UEFA Women's Champions League)	1 (Note: Appearance(s) in Supercopa de España)	0	40	6
Real Madrid	2022–23	Liga F	26	3	4	0	8	1	1	0	39	4
Real Madrid	2023–24	Liga F	27	6	1	0	7	2	1	0	36	8
Real Madrid	2024–25	Liga F	26	5	4	0	10	0	2	0	42	5
Real Madrid	Total		135	21	13	1	33	6	5	0	186	28
Paris Saint-Germain	2025–26	Première Ligue	18	1	2	0	5	1	3 (Note: One appearance in Première Ligue play-offs, two appearances in Coupe LFFP)	0	28	2
Paris Saint-Germain	2026–27	Première Ligue	1	0	0	0	0	0	0	0	1	0
Paris Saint-Germain	Total		19	1	2	0	5	1	3	0	29	2
Career total			229	29	20	1	38	7	8	0	295	37

=== International ===
As of match played 9 June 2026

Appearances and goals by national team and year
National team	Year	Apps	Goals
Spain	2021	5	0
Spain	2022	13	0
Spain	2023	18	3
Spain	2024	14	0
Spain	2025	17	0
Spain	2026	3	0
Total		70	3

Scores and results list Spain's goal tally first, score column indicates score after each Carmona goal.

List of international goals scored by Olga Carmona
No.	Date	Venue	Opponent	Score	Result	Competition
1	19 February 2023	CommBank Stadium, Sydney, Australia	Australia	1–3	2–3	2023 Cup of Nations
2	15 August 2023	Eden Park, Auckland, New Zealand	Sweden	2–1	2–1	2023 FIFA Women's World Cup
3	20 August 2023	Stadium Australia, Sydney, Australia	England	1–0	1–0	2023 FIFA Women's World Cup

== Honours ==
Spain

- FIFA Women's World Cup: 2023
- UEFA Women's Championship runner-up: 2025
- UEFA Women's Nations League: 2023–24, 2025

Spain U19

- UEFA Women's Under-19 Championship: 2018

Individual

- FIFA Women's World Cup Final Player of the Match: 2023
- FIFA FIFPRO Women's World 11: 2023, 2024
- IFFHS Women's World Team of the Year: 2023
- Primera División Team of the Year: 2023–24
