= María Méndez =

Spanish footballer (born 2001)

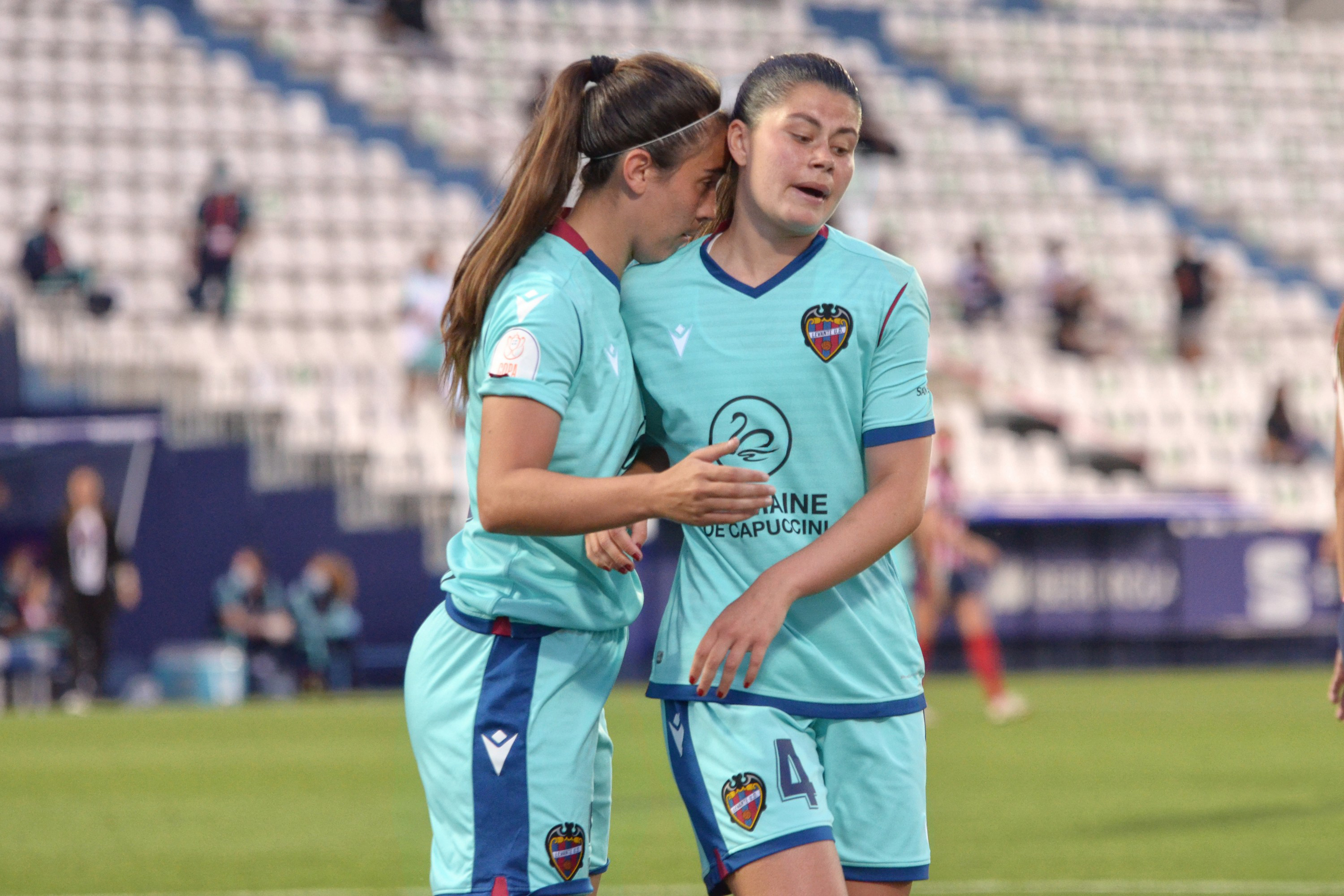
- Méndez (right) with Levante UD in 2021

Personal information
- Full name: María Méndez Fernández
- Date of birth: 10 April 2001 (age 25)
- Place of birth: Oviedo, Spain
- Height: 1.70 m (5 ft 7 in)
- Position: Centre back

Team information
- Current team: Real Madrid
- Number: 14

Youth career
- 2015–2016: Oviedo Moderno B

Senior career*
Years	Team	Apps	(Gls)
2016–2019	Oviedo Moderno/Real Oviedo	3+	(0+)
2019–2020	Deportivo La Coruña	20	(4)
2020–2024	Levante	96	(8)
2024–	Real Madrid	46	(5)

International career^{‡}
2018	Spain U17	11	(0)
2019	Spain U19	2	(0)
2021–2022	Spain U23	3	(1)
2022–	Spain	21	(3)
2019	Asturias	1	(1)
Medal record
Women's football
Representing Spain
UEFA Women's Championship
Runner-up	2025 Switzerland
UEFA Women's Nations League
Winner	2024 France–Netherlands–Spain
FIFA U-17 Women's World Cup
Winner	2018 Uruguay
UEFA Women's Under-17 Championship
Winner	2018 Lithuania
- * Club domestic league appearances and goals as of 19:48, 31 August 2026 (UTC) ‡ National team caps and goals as of 16:09, 18 April 2026 (UTC)

María Méndez Fernández (born 10 April 2001) is a Spanish professional footballer who plays as a centre back for Liga F club Real Madrid and the Spain national team.

== Club career ==
=== Oviedo Moderno/Real Oviedo ===
Méndez began playing for Oviedo Moderno's youth teams at 13, and eventually moved up to their B team. At 15, she made her debut for Oviedo's senior team, and for the 2016–17 season, she made the jump to the first team, which was relegated to the Segunda División in the previous season. Around this time, Méndez began to play as a midfielder, which she would continue to do before leaving for Deportivo de La Coruña.

In the 2017–18 season, Méndez won Group 1 of the Segunda División with Oviedo. They advanced to promotion playoffs for the Primera División, but were knocked out 1–2 on aggregate by EdF Logroño. After Méndez won the 2018 FIFA U-17 Women's World Cup with Spain, she was honored at the Estadio Carlos Tartiere, and Oviedo released a statement hailing her as a "club legend."

While at Oviedo, Méndez was given the nickname "Pecas," meaning "freckles" in Spanish. Later on in her time at Oviedo, Méndez became one of the club's captains.

=== Deportivo la Coruña ===
On 17 June 2019, Méndez joined newly-promoted Deportivo de La Coruña with a one-year deal upon the expiration of her contract with Oviedo. In her first season playing in the Spanish top flight, she made 20 league appearances and scored 4 goals as the club finished in 6th place.

=== Levante UD ===
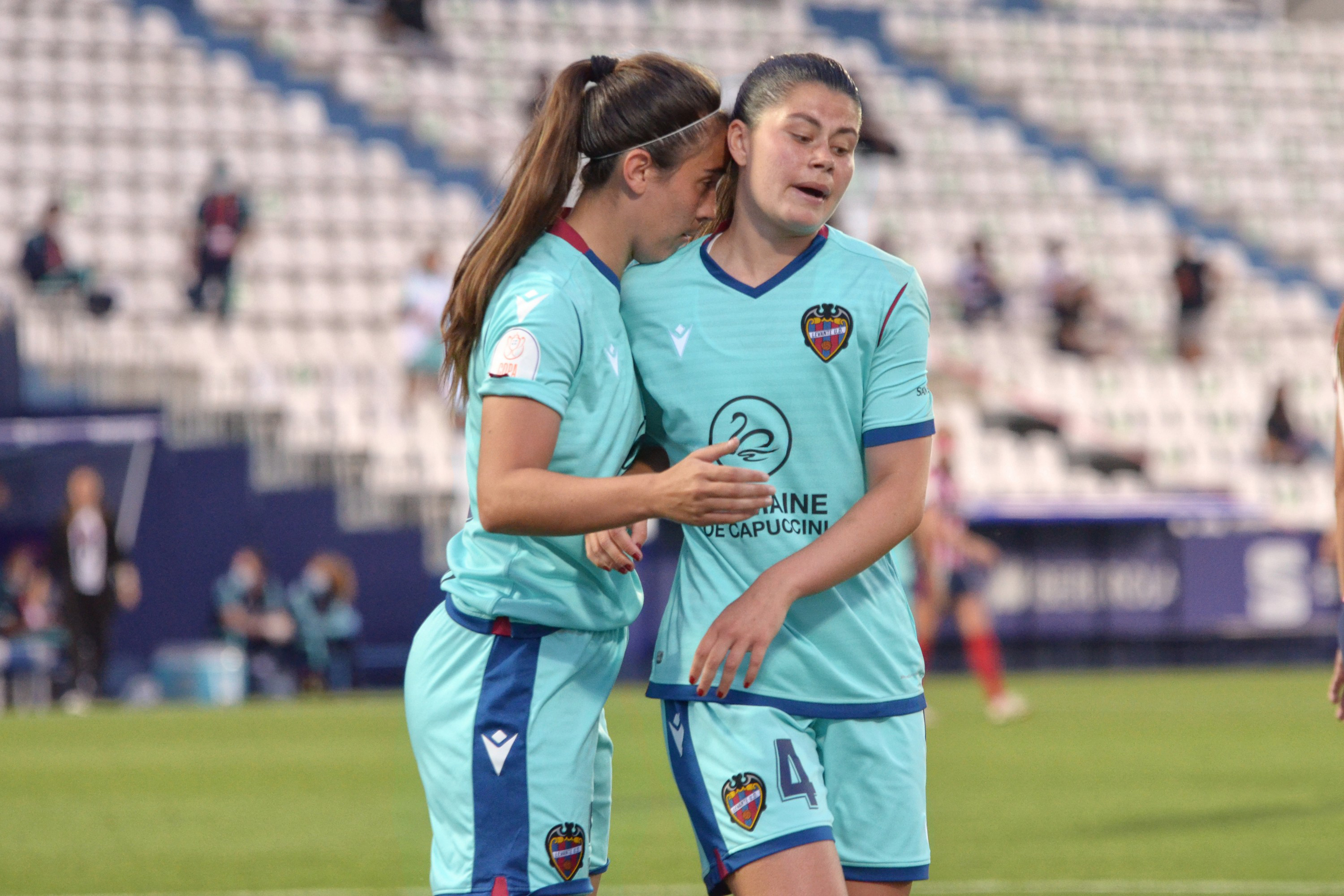
Méndez (right) with Levante UD in 2021

On 24 June 2020, Méndez joined Levante UD on a three-year deal. In her first season at Levante, Méndez played all but two of Levante's league matches as they finished third in the Primera División, qualifying for the UEFA Women's Champions League for the first time in 12 years. She also played in each match of Levante's runner-up 2020–21 Copa de la Reina campaign. In the quarterfinals of the tournament, Méndez scored both goals in a 2–1 win against UDG Tenerife to send Levante through to the semifinals. After beating Atlético Madrid in extra time, Méndez played the first Copa de la Reina final of her career as Levante lost 4–2 to FC Barcelona.

Ahead of the 2021–22 season, Méndez was given the role of Levante's fourth captain. She made her debut in the UEFA Women's Champions League with a win against Celtic in the first qualifying round, and Levante advanced to the final round after defeating Rosenborg BK. Levante faced Olympique Lyonnais in the final round of qualifying and lost 4–2 on aggregate, ending their Champions League season.

=== Real Madrid ===
On 10 July 2024, Méndez joined Real Madrid She quickly became an important player for the team, establishing herself in the starting lineup as Real Madrid finished second in the Liga F and reached the quarter-finals of the UWCL, where they were eliminated by Arsenal.

== International career ==
Méndez was a regular starter in Spain's U17 team that won the 2018 UEFA Women's Under-17 Championship, which qualified them for the 2018 FIFA U-17 Women's World Cup.

On 2 November 2018, Méndez was called up to play in the 2018 FIFA U-17 Women's World Cup. She started all of Spain's matches in the tournament, and on 1 December 2018, Méndez started the final of the final against Mexico, which ended in a 2–1 victory for Spain. Spain's U17s became the first Spanish team to win a Women's World Cup in any age category.

In 2019, Méndez was given her first call-up to Spain's U-19 women's national team.

Méndez made her senior debut on 11 November 2022, starting in a 7–0 friendly home win over Argentina. She scored her first international goal in the Nations League 7-1 away win over Switzerland.

On 10 June 2025, Méndez was called up to the Spain squad for the UEFA Women's Euro 2025.

== Personal life ==
Méndez is the younger sister of Miguel Méndez, a former player of Real Oviedo's youth teams and the former coach of Real Oviedo Femenino.

== Career statistics ==
=== International ===
Appearances and goals by national team and year
National team	Year	Apps	Goals
Spain	2022	1	0
Spain	2023	3	1
Spain	2024	2	1
Total		6	2

Scores and results list Spain's goal tally first, score column indicates score after each Méndez goal.

List of international goals scored by María Méndez
No.	Date	Venue	Opponent	Score	Result	Competition
1	31 October 2023	Letzigrund, Zürich, Switzerland	Switzerland	3–0	7–1	2023–24 UEFA Women's Nations League
2	9 April 2024	Estadio El Plantío, Burgos, Spain	Czech Republic	1–1	3–1	UEFA Women's Euro 2025 qualifying
3	18 April 2026	Estadio Nuevo Arcángel, Córdoba, Spain	Ukraine	3–0	5–0	2027 FIFA Women's World Cup qualification

== Honours ==
Real Oviedo

- Segunda Division, Group I: 2017–18

Spain

- UEFA Women's Championship runner-up: 2025
- UEFA Women's Nations League: 2023–24, 2025

Spain U17

- FIFA U-17 Women's World Cup: 2018
- UEFA Women's Under-17 Championship: 2018
