= Ivana Andrés =

Spanish footballer (born 1994)

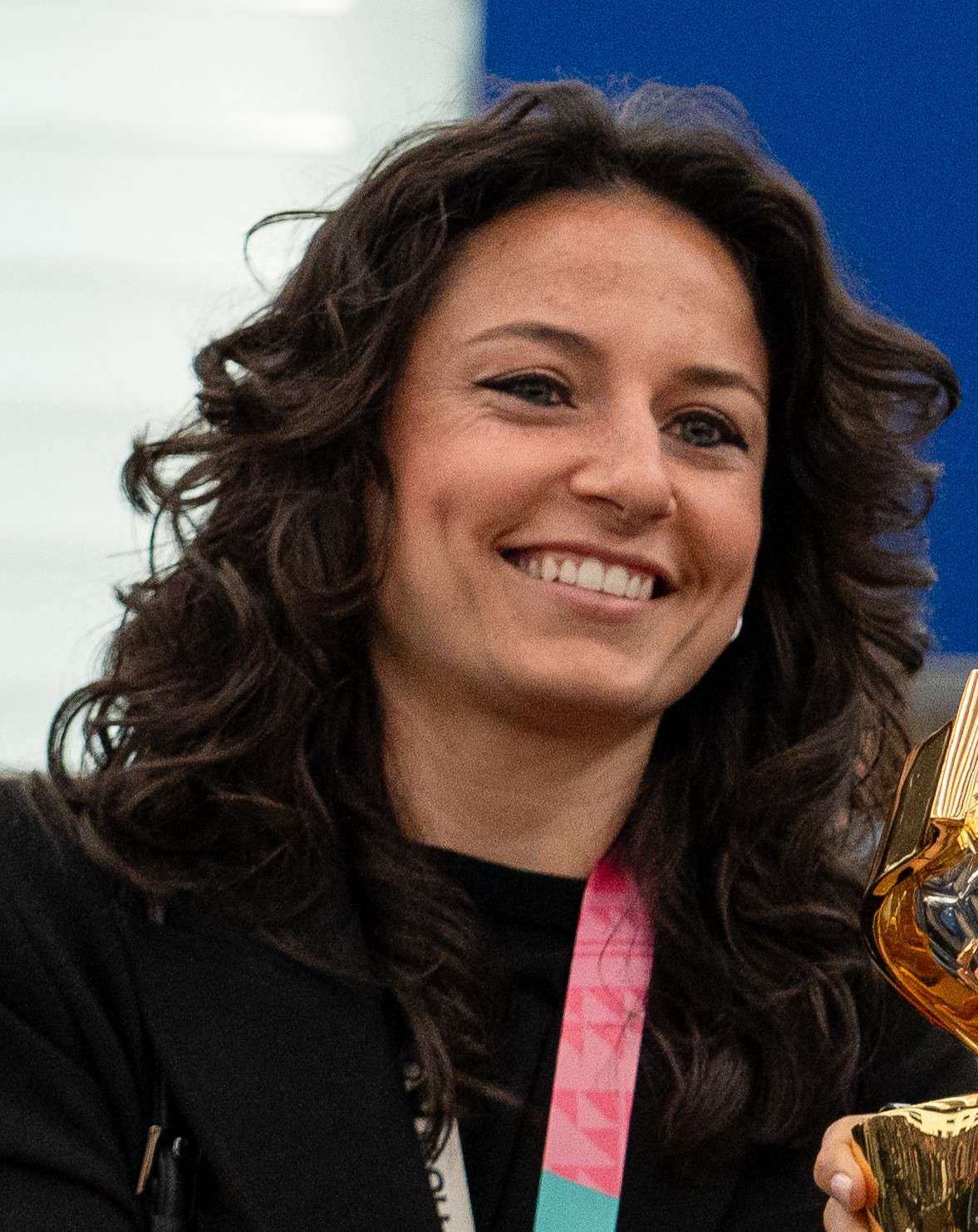
- Andrés in 2024

Personal information
- Full name: Ivana Andrés Sanz
- Date of birth: 13 July 1994 (age 32)
- Place of birth: Aielo de Malferit, Spain
- Height: 1.64 m (5 ft 5 in)
- Position: Centre back

Team information
- Current team: Inter Milan
- Number: 5

Youth career
- Aielo CF
- 2007–2008: DSV Colegio Alemán

Senior career*
Years	Team	Apps	(Gls)
2009–2018	Valencia	237	(6)
2018–2020	Levante	49	(2)
2020–2024	Real Madrid	105	(2)
2024–	Inter Milan	46	(3)

International career^{‡}
2015–2023	Spain	53	(0)
Medal record
Women's football
Representing Spain
FIFA Women's World Cup
Winner	2023 Australia–New Zealand
UEFA Women's Under-17 Championship
Winner	2010 Switzerland
Winner	2011 Switzerland
- * Club domestic league appearances and goals as of 10 May 2026 (UTC) ‡ National team caps and goals as of 21:37, 27 March 2024 (UTC)

Ivana Andrés Sanz (born 13 July 1994) is a Spanish professional footballer who plays as a centre back for Serie A club Inter Milan and the Spain national team.

== Club career ==
=== Youth ===
Ivana Andrés began her career in her hometown of Aielo de Malferit in the local club Aielo CF. At age 12 she joined the DSV Colegio Alemán school in the 2007–08 campaign Here she went through the C and B teams before making it into the Valencia CF first team in 2009, which was already playing in the First Division at the time.

=== Valencia ===
In 2009, the club signed an agreement with Valencia CF and from then on operated as the women's football section of the renowned club. She would play at FC Valencia for nine more years, reaching, among other things, the final of the 2015 Copa de la Reina, where the team finally reached the final after a surprising 1-0 win in the semi-final against favorites FC Barcelona lost 2-1 to Sporting de Huelva. In the 2016/17 season, third place in the league was the best result in the club's history. In her final years at Valencia FC, Ivana Andrés was captain of the team.

=== Levante ===
After several years in the team, being the club captain for the last seasons, she made a surprise transfer to city rivals Levante UD, with whom she finished third in the Spanish championship in two seasons behind the dominant teams of the time, FC Barcelona and Atlético Madrid.

=== Real Madrid ===
In the summer of 2020, she signed for Real Madrid's newly founded women's section and was named team captain in her first season.

In the first match of the year for 2024, Andrés scored the equalizer in the 2-1 victory over Madrid CFF in the 91st minute.

=== Inter Milan ===
On 27 June 2024, Andrés was announced at Inter Milan on a three year contract.

== International career ==
=== Youth ===
As an under-17 international, Ivana Andrés took part in the 2010 U-17 World Cup and achieved third place. She was in the starting line-up in all six final round matches. She won first place in the 2010 U-17 European Championship over the Republic of Ireland. The following year she played in the European Championship again with the U17s, winning the gold medal with a 1-0 victory in the final against France. Andrés competed in both the semifinals and the final.

With the U-19 national team she reached the final of the 2012 European Championship where they lost in the final after extra time against Sweden.

=== Senior ===
Ivana Andrés made her debut in the senior squad on February 11, 2015 in a friendly match against Belgium, the same year she was called up to the final squad for the 2015 World Cup, but did not make any appearances during the tournament. She won her first title with the national team at the 2017 Algarve Cup, where Spain prevailed 1-0 in the final against Canada. Ivana Andrés played all four games. She missed the 2017 European Championship, which took place shortly afterwards, due to a broken collarbone.

On 20 May 2019, Andrés was called up to the Spain squad for the 2019 FIFA Women's World Cup.

Andrés was part of the Spain squad called up for the UEFA Women's Euro 2022.

Andrés was called up to the 23-player Spain squad for the 2023 FIFA Women's World Cup. She won first place in the 2023 World Cup with her team.

== Personal life ==
Since June 2022 Andrés is married to her wife Anabel Moreno Barragán.

== Career statistics ==
=== Club ===
As of match played 10 May 2026

Appearances and goals by club, season and competition
Club	Season	League			National Cup (Note: Includes Copa de la Reina)		Continental (Note: Includes UEFA Women's Champions League)		Other		Total	
Club	Season	Division	Apps	Goals	Apps	Goals	Apps	Goals	Apps	Goals	Apps	Goals
Valencia	2009–10	Superliga Femenina	18	0	–		–		–		18	0
Valencia	2010–11	Superliga Femenina	22	1	2	0	–		–		24	1
Valencia	2011–12	Primera División	29	1	–		–		–		29	1
Valencia	2012–13	Primera División	24	1	–		–		–		24	1
Valencia	2013–14	Primera División	25	1	–		–		–		25	1
Valencia	2014–15	Primera División	30	1	3	0	–		–		33	1
Valencia	2015–16	Primera División	30	1	2	0	–		–		32	1
Valencia	2016–17	Primera División	30	0	1	0	–		–		31	0
Valencia	2017–18	Primera División	29	0	2	0	–		–		31	0
Valencia	Total		237	6	10	0	–		–		247	6
Levante	2018–19	Primera División	28	2	1	0	–		–		29	2
Levante	2019–20	Primera División	21	0	1	0	–		1 (Note: Appearances in Supercopa de España)	0	23	0
Levante	Total		49	2	2	0	–		1	0	52	2
Real Madrid	2020–21	Primera División	31	0	1	0	—		—		32	0
Real Madrid	2021–22	Primera División	27	0	1	0	8	0	1	0	37	0
Real Madrid	2022–23	Liga F	22	0	4	1	6	0	1	0	33	1
Real Madrid	2023–24	Liga F	25	2	2	0	7	0	1	0	35	2
Real Madrid	Total		105	2	8	1	21	0	3	0	137	3
Inter Milan	2024–25	Serie A Women	25	2	2	0	–		–		27	2
Inter Milan	2025–26	Serie A Women	21	1	2	0	5 (Note: Appearances in UEFA Women's Europa Cup)	0	3 (Note: Appearances in Serie A Women's Cup)	0	31	1
Inter Milan	Total		46	3	4	0	5	0	3	0	58	3
Career total			437	13	24	1	26	0	7	0	494	14

=== International ===
Appearances and goals by national team and year
National team	Year	Apps	Goals
Spain	2015	2	0
Spain	2016	0	0
Spain	2017	8	0
Spain	2018	6	0
Spain	2019	6	0
Spain	2020	1	0
Spain	2021	7	0
Spain	2022	12	0
Spain	2023	11	0
Total		53	0

== Honours ==
Spain

- FIFA Women's World Cup: 2023
- UEFA Women's Nations League: 2023–24
- UEFA Women's Under-17 Championship: 2010, 2011
- Algarve Cup: 2017

Inter Milan

- Serie A runner-up: 2025–26

Individual

- Serie A Best Defender: 2024–25
- Serie A Team of the Season: 2024–25, 2025–26
- AIC Serie A Women's Team of the Year: 2024–25
