= Maite Oroz =

Spanish footballer

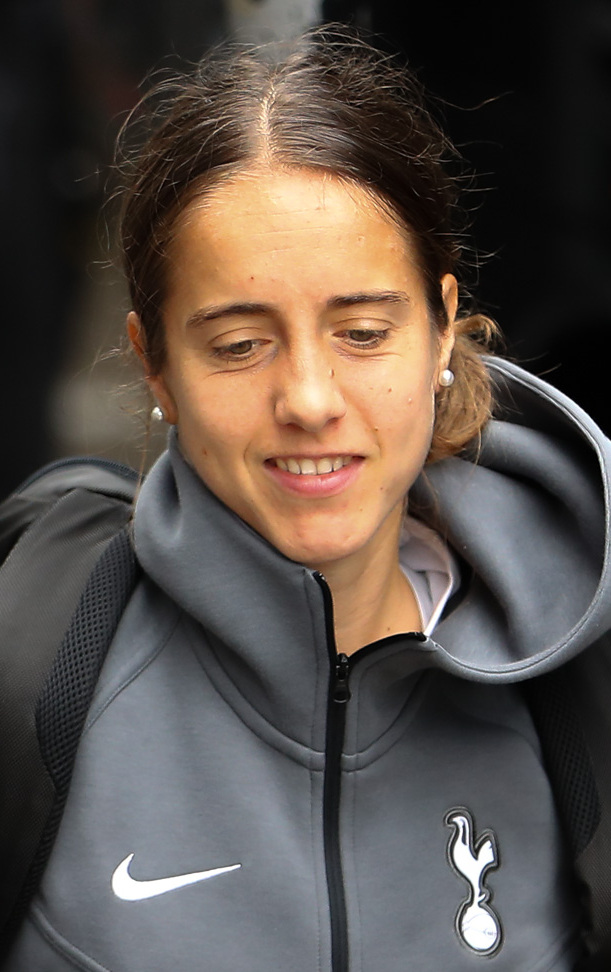
- Oroz with Tottenham Hotspur in 2024

Personal information
- Full name: Maite Oroz Areta
- Date of birth: 25 March 1998 (age 28)
- Place of birth: Huarte, Spain
- Height: 1.56 m (5 ft 1 in)
- Position: Midfielder

Team information
- Current team: Tottenham Hotspur
- Number: 10

Youth career
- 2004–2010: Huarte
- 2010–2013: Osasuna

Senior career*
Years	Team	Apps	(Gls)
2013–2014	Osasuna		
2014–2015	Athletic Club B	23	(10)
2015–2020	Athletic Club	107	(8)
2020–2024	Real Madrid	110	(12)
2024–	Tottenham Hotspur	17	(0)

International career^{‡}
2013	Spain U16		
2013–2015	Spain U17	13	(4)
2016–2017	Spain U19	16	(8)
2016–2018	Spain U20	9	(0)
2017–2020	Basque Country	2	(0)
2017–2020	Navarre	1	(0)
2021–	Spain	15	(4)
Medal record
Women's football
Representing Spain
UEFA Women's Nations League
Winner	2024 France–Netherlands–Spain
- * Club domestic league appearances and goals as of 14:41, 17 May 2026 (UTC) ‡ National team caps and goals as of 00:18, 2 July 2024 (UTC)

Maite Oroz Areta (Spanish: [ˈmajte oˈɾoθ aˈɾeta]; born 25 March 1998) is a Spanish professional footballer who plays as a midfielder for Women's Super League club Tottenham Hotspur and the Spain national team. She made her senior club debut with Athletic Club in 2015 and departed in 2020, then played for Real Madrid for four years before moving to England and joining Tottenham in 2024.

== Club career ==
Born in Huarte, Navarre, Oroz began playing football with boys in the village team CD Huarte at the age of 6, joining the youth system at Osasuna in nearby Pamplona aged 12. From an early age, she was marked out as a promising talent due to her skill in the ball, creativity, and confidence. She played with Osasuna's senior team for a season in the Segunda División before the women's section of the club was disbanded in 2014, leading her to join Athletic Club.

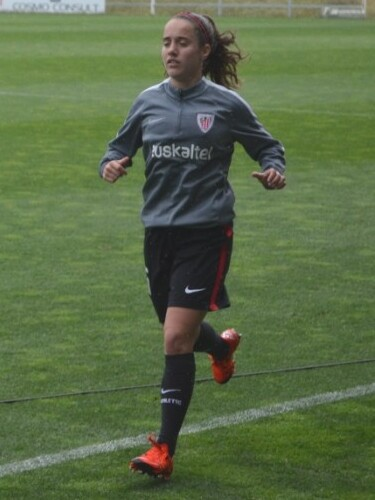
Oroz warming up with Athletic Club, 2017

Following a year with the club's B-team, she made her senior team debut in September 2015 and became a regular from then on, making 30 appearances in the 2015–16 Primera División as Athletic finished as champions. She played and scored in the subsequent 2016–17 UEFA Champions League, but the club did not progress beyond the opening knockout round.

In September 2018, Oroz sustained a serious injury, rupturing the anterior cruciate ligament of her left knee during a league match against Atlético Madrid (one of several such injuries suffered by players in Athletic's various teams over a short period) which ruled her out for the entire 2018–19 season. Along with teammate and friend Damaris Egurrola, she decided to leave the club when her contract expired in the summer of 2020. In July 2020, after she had already agreed to join Real Madrid Femenino, a court case regarding the legality of 'compensation lists' for players in Spanish women's football confirmed that her new employers would not have to pay a fee to Athletic Club.

She immediately became a part of Real Madrid's history by being one of the 11 players to start in their first official match in October 2020 (with almost a full team of new signings, they lost 4–0 at home to Barcelona). Two weeks later she was among the scorers in their first victory, and by March 2023 had made her 100th appearance for the Merengues, reaching the milestone in the same match as goalkeeper Misa Rodríguez.

On 13 September 2024, Oroz signed for Tottenham Hotspur on a four-year contract.

On 21 October 2025, Tottenham announced that Oroz had suffered a season-ending ACL injury during a League Cup game against Birmingham City.

== International career ==
Oroz was involved with Spanish national age-group teams at several levels and with much success, being a member of the under-17 squad that claimed the bronze medal at the 2013 UEFA Women's Under-17 Championship, silver at the 2014 FIFA U-17 Women's World Cup and gold at the 2015 UEFA Women's Under-17 Championship; the under-19 squad which reached the final of the 2016 UEFA Women's Under-19 Championship then won the 2017 tournament; and the under-20 squad who were runners-up at the 2018 FIFA U-20 Women's World Cup, having also been involved in the 2016 edition.

In October 2019, she was called up to the inaugural squad for España Promesas (essentially Spain B), along with two clubmates.

Oroz made her senior debut for Spain in 2021; she was a member of the squad that won the 2024 UEFA Women's Nations League Finals, but was not selected for other major tournaments around that time.

She has also played for the unofficial Basque Country and Navarre representative teams, making her debut for both in 2017.

== Career statistics ==
=== Club ===
As of match played 16 May 2026

Appearances and goals by club, season and competition
Club	Season	League			National cup (Note: Includes Copa de la Reina, Women's FA Cup)		League cup (Note: Includes FA Women's League Cup)		Continental (Note: Includes UEFA Women's Champions League)		Other (Note: Includes Supercopa de España Femenina)		Total	
Club	Season	Division	Apps	Goals	Apps	Goals	Apps	Goals	Apps	Goals	Apps	Goals	Apps	Goals
Athletic Club	2015–16	Primera División	30	5	1	0	—		—		—		31	5
Athletic Club	2016–17	Primera División	27	1	1	0	—		2	1	—		30	2
Athletic Club	2017–18	Primera División	26	2	3	0	—		—		—		29	2
Athletic Club	2018–19	Primera División	3	0	0	0	—		—		—		3	0
Athletic Club	2019–20	Primera División	21	0	2	0	—		—		—		23	0
Athletic Club	Total		107	8	7	0	—		2	1	—		116	9
Real Madrid	2020–21	Primera División	30	1	1	0	—		—		—		31	1
Real Madrid	2021–22	Primera División	26	2	3	0	—		6	1	1	0	36	3
Real Madrid	2022–23	Liga F	29	3	4	0	—		10	0	1	0	34	3
Real Madrid	2023–24	Liga F	24	5	2	0	—		7	0	1	0	34	5
Real Madrid	2024–25	Liga F	1	1	0	0	—		0	0	0	0	1	1
Real Madrid	Total		110	12	10	0	—		23	1	3	0	136	13
Tottenham Hotspur	2024–25	Women's Super League	16	0	0	0	3	0	—		—		19	0
Tottenham Hotspur	2025–26	Women's Super League	1	0	0	0	2	0	—		—		3	0
Tottenham Hotspur	Total		17	0	0	0	5	0	—		—		22	0
Career total			234	20	17	0	5	0	25	2	3	0	274	22

=== International ===
As of match played 17 July 2024

Appearances and goals by national team and year
National team	Year	Apps	Goals
Spain	2021	1	0
Spain	2022	4	1
Spain	2023	7	3
Spain	2024	3	0
Total		15	4

Scores and results list Spain's goal tally first, score column indicates score after each Oroz goal.

List of international goals scored by Maite Oroz
No.	Date	Venue	Opponent	Score	Result	Competition
1	11 November 2022	Estadio Municipal Álvarez Claro, Melilla, Spain	Argentina	2–0	7–0	Friendly
2	16 February 2023	Industree Group Stadium, Gosford, Australia	Jamaica	1–0	3–0	2023 Cup of Nations
3	26 September 2023	Estadio Nuevo Arcángel, Córdoba, Spain	Switzerland	5–0	5–0	2023–24 UEFA Women's Nations League
4	31 October 2023	Letzigrund, Zürich, Switzerland	Switzerland	7–1	7–1	2023–24 UEFA Women's Nations League

== Honours ==
Spain

- UEFA Women's Nations League: 2023–24
