= 2021–22 Real Madrid Femenino season =

Real Madrid Femenino
2021–22 season
- President: Florentino Pérez
- Coach: David Aznar (until 29 November); Alberto Toril (from 29 November)
- Stadium: Alfredo Di Stéfano Stadium
- Primera División: 3rd
- Copa de la Reina: Semi-finals
- Supercopa de España: Semi-finals
- UEFA Champions League: Quarter-finals
- Top goalscorer: League: Esther González (14); All: Esther González (17)
- Highest home attendance: 3,318 vs Barcelona, UEFA Women's Champions League, 22 March 2022
- Biggest win: 5–0 vs Breiðablik, UEFA Women's Champions League, 13 October 2021
- Biggest defeat: 0–5 vs Barcelona, Primera División, 13 March 2022
Home colours	Away colours	Third colours

The 2021–22 season was the 6th season in the existence of Real Madrid Femenino and the club's 2nd season after being officially rebranded as part of Real Madrid. In addition to the domestic league, they participated in the Copa de la Reina. By virtue of their performances the previous season, the club also competed in the UEFA Women's Champions League and the Supercopa de España for the very first time.

David Aznar returned for his fourth campaign as a coach but was sacked and replaced by Alberto Toril after the club's draw with Alavés on match day eleven.

== Competitions ==
=== Overall record ===
Competition	First match	Last match	Starting round	Final position	Record							
Competition	First match	Last match	Starting round	Final position	Pld	W	D	L	GF	GA	GD	Win %
Primera División	5 September 2021	15 May 2022	Matchday 1		30	19	3	8	41	31	+10	63.33
Copa de la Reina	1 March 2022	25 May 2022	Round of 16	Semi-finals	3	2	0	1	6	5	+1	66.67
Supercopa de España	19 January 2022		Semi-finals	Semi-finals	1	0	0	1	0	1	−1	0.00
UEFA Women's Champions League	31 August 2021	30 March 2022	Second qualifying round	Quarter-finals	10	5	1	4	17	15	+2	50.00
Total					44	26	4	14	64	52	+12	59.09

Source: Soccerway

=== Primera División ===
==== League table ====
Pos	Team	Pld	W	D	L	GF	GA	GD	Pts	Qualification or relegation
1	Barcelona (C)	30	30	0	0	159	11	+148	90	Qualification for the Champions League group stage
2	Real Sociedad	30	21	3	6	67	38	+29	66	Qualification for the Champions League second round
3	Real Madrid	30	19	3	8	41	31	+10	60	Qualification for the Champions League first round
4	Atlético de Madrid	30	17	8	5	71	28	+43	59	
5	Granadilla	30	16	6	8	42	44	−2	54	

Source: RFEF Primera Iberdrola
Rules for classification: 1) Points; 2) Head-to-head points; 3) Goal difference; 4) Number of goals scored
(C) Champions

=== UEFA Champions League ===
==== Second Qualifying Round ====
The second round draw was held on 22 August 2021.

31 August 2021 First-leg	Real Madrid (Spain)	1–1	(England) Manchester City	Madrid
21:00	Robles 90+2'	Report	Weir 47'	Stadium: Alfredo Di Stéfano; Referee: Sandra Bastos (Portugal)

8 September 2021 Second-leg	Manchester City (England)	0–1 (1-2 agg.)	(Spain) Real Madrid	Manchester
20:00 (19:00 BST)		Report	Zornoza 44'	Stadium: MCFC Academy Stadium; Referee: Riem Hussein (Germany)

Real Madrid won 2–1 on aggregate.

==== Group stage ====
The group stage draw was held on 13 September 2021.

Pos	Team	Pld	W	D	L	GF	GA	GD	Pts	Qualification
1	(France) Paris Saint-Germain	6	6	0	0	25	0	+25	18	Advance to Quarter-finals
2	(Spain) Real Madrid	6	4	0	2	12	6	+6	12	Advance to Quarter-finals
3	(Ukraine) Zhytlobud-1 Kharkiv	6	1	1	4	2	15	−13	4	
4	(Iceland) Breiðablik	6	0	1	5	0	18	−18	1	

Source: UEFA
Rules for classification: Group stage tiebreakers
