= Real Madrid Femenino =

Women's association football club in Madrid

- Full name: Real Madrid Club de Fútbol Femenino
- Nicknames: Las Blancas (The Whites); Las Merengues (The Meringues); Las Vikingos (The Vikings); La Casa Blanca (The White House); Madridistas (Supporters)
- Short name: RMA
- Founded: Club Deportivo TACÓN: 12 September 2014; 12 years ago Real Madrid Femenino: 1 July 2020; 6 years ago
- Stadium: Estadio Alfredo Di Stéfano
- Capacity: 6,000
- President: Florentino Pérez
- Head coach: Pau Quesada
- League: Liga F
- 2025–26: Liga F, 2nd
- Website: realmadrid.com/womens
Home colours	Away colours	Third colours

Real Madrid Club de Fútbol Femenino is a Spanish professional women’s football club based in Madrid, competing in the Primera División, the highest level of women’s football in Spain. Founded in 2014 as the independent Club Deportivo TACÓN, the team entered into a merger and acquisition process with Real Madrid CF in 2019. Upon the completion of this integration, it was officially rebranded in 2020 as the women’s football section of Real Madrid. The team hosts its home fixtures at the Alfredo Di Stéfano Stadium, a venue within the club’s Ciudad Real Madrid training complex.

== History ==
=== 2014–2019: Club Deportivo TACÓN ===
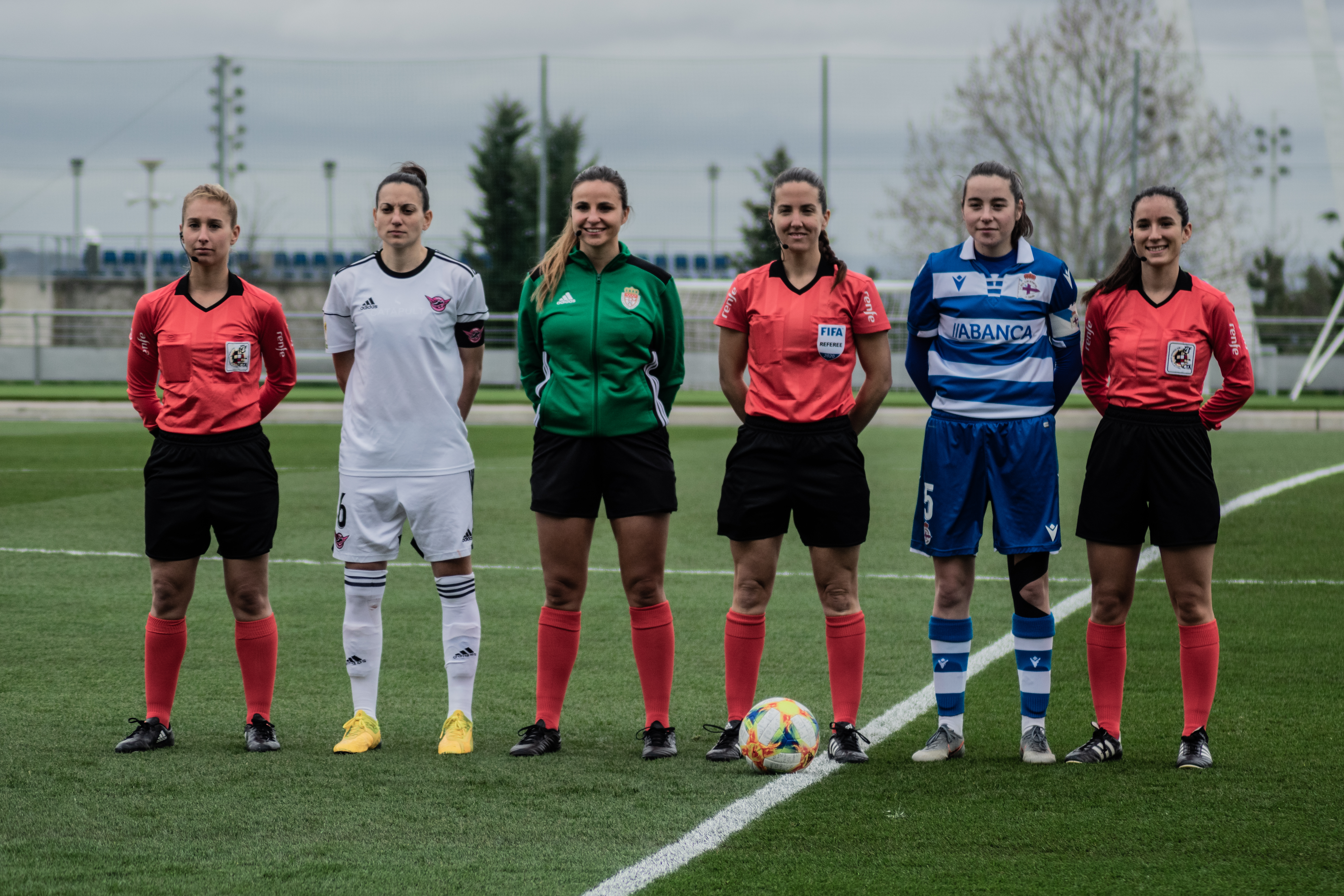
Final season as CD Tacón against Deportivo in March 2020

CD TACÓN was founded on 12 September 2014. The name TACÓN (Heel) is an acronym of Trabajo (work) Atrevimiento (dare/bravery) Conocimiento (knowledge) Organización (organisation) Notoriedad (visibility/renown). In their first competitive season, 2015–16, the club only registered an under-14 team. In June 2016, TACÓN announced a merger with CD Canillas for incorporating their women's senior (which had been competing in the second tier for the past three seasons) and under-19 teams.

In their first season at senior level, in the 2016–17 Segunda División, TACÓN finished second in their regional group, below Madrid CFF who won promotion to the Primera División.

Because both TACÓN and Madrid CFF (founded in 2010 by businessman Alfredo Ulloa, a Real Madrid socio - club member - like TACÓN's founder, Ana Rossell) were clubs open to a potential takeover by Real Madrid, a rivalry developed between them. Rosell described the clubs' relations as "cordial" in 2019.

Rossell had petitioned successive Real Madrid presidents, Lorenzo Sanz, Florentino Pérez and Ramón Calderón, to create a women's football section since 1997, but received no official response. According to Rossell, her requests were denied, with club executives citing that a women's section wasn't economically sustainable. In those years, she was a player for Atlético Feminas and Canillas. In 2016, Rossell called publicly for Real Madrid to create a women's football section.

In June 2017 Real Madrid's president, Florentino Pérez, claimed that the club would make its own women's team from scratch, and not buy an existing club. Rossell had claimed in 2013 that Pérez was first starting to consider women's football at the club. Real was thus doing so several years or decades later than many other clubs in Europe and in the city of Madrid itself. On El Larguero in 2017, Pérez said “We will definitely have a women’s team,” he said. “We’re working on it, but it will be from the position of a newly formed club, not a team in which we bring the best player from Germany, Brazil… That is not what Madridismo is all about.”

As late as September 2018, Pérez still ruled out having a women's team, as El Confidencial reported: "Florentino did not want to spend on a section that did not guarantee trophies and his agents lied to him about the expenses necessary for him to create it". Women's football was not mentioned at all by Pérez at the club's annual assembly on 23 September 2018, and Oscar Sanz of El País wrote, "Real Madrid has the dubious honor of being, together with Getafe, the only First Division club that has neither had nor has a women's team."

=== 2019: Takeover by Real Madrid ===
After three seasons in the Segunda División, on 19 May 2019, TACÓN achieved promotion to the Primera División.

On 25 June 2019, the Real Madrid CF board of directors announced a proposal of integrating TACÓN as their women's football section to be presented to their socios (members). As part of the agreement, TACÓN would play their 2019–20 season matches at Ciudad Real Madrid during the transition, with the merger being officially completed on 1 July 2020. On 15 September 2019, The Extraordinary General Assembly of Real Madrid approved the absorption of the club. Florentino Perez, speaking at the General Assembly after the vote to absorb was passed, cited that TACÓN's youth system was the reason why it was chosen as the base for the women's team, thus striving to stay true to Real Madrid's philosophy of developing Spanish talent.

=== 2019–2020: Transition year ===
Having been promoted, the club went on to lose a large majority of its playing squad in the summer of 2019. Argentine midfielder Ruth Bravo moved to Rayo Vallecano, while others like Lixy, Marbel Okoye and Yamilla Badell did not have their contracts renewed. In order to strengthen for the coming season, the club saw the arrival of Swedish duo Kosovare Asllani and Sofia Jakobsson; French midfielder Aurélie Kaci from Atlético Madrid, Ainoa Campo from Madrid CFF, English forward Chioma Ubogagu, goalkeeper Ana Valles Nigerian defender Osinachi Ohale, as well as the Brazilian pair Daiane and Thaisa Moreno, who was nominated for best midfielder in her lone year at A.C. Milan Women. The last signing of the summer was versatile defender Babett Peter from VFL Wolfsburg.

Despite the wealth of talent and experience at their disposal, CD TACÓN's start to the season was nothing short of abysmal, with a heavy loss against Barcelona (9–1) in its debut match, and EDF Logroño particularly standing out. After a poor run with just one win in nine games, the team started to gain a sense of stability in November 2019, going on a five match unbeaten run. TACÓN finished the shortened 2019–20 season in 10th place, with many fans unhappy with how the team had thrown away a 3–0 lead with ten minutes to go and ended up losing 4–3 on home soil in the last match before the outbreak of the COVID-19 pandemic.

Real Madrid Women were also the subject of a documentary series in 2020.

=== 2020–2021: Real Madrid Femenino ===
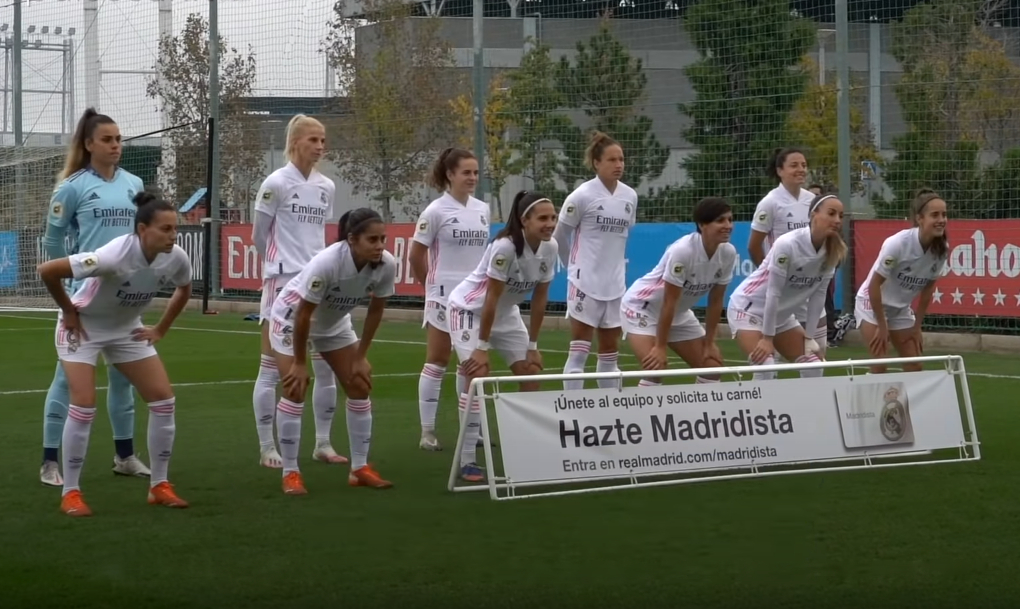
Real Madrid's first season (2020–21) after being officially incorporated under the Real Madrid banner

On 1 July 2020, Real Madrid CF released an official communication confirming the completion of the takeover, thereby signalling the complete absorption of CD TACÓN, which would then operate as 'Real Madrid' from that date onwards.

The new structure of the section includes a senior team, reserve side similar to Castilla, known as 'Real Madrid Femenino B', an Under-19 team, 'Juvenil' and a 'Cadete' for under-15s and below. The structure already existed under CD TACÓN and has been integrated into Real Madrid's famous La Fábrica. The remaining TACÓN Juvenil and Cadete teams that couldn't be absorbed right away have since been rebranded as 'Fenix Football Club', which in turn merged with CD Masriver in 2021.

== Crests ==
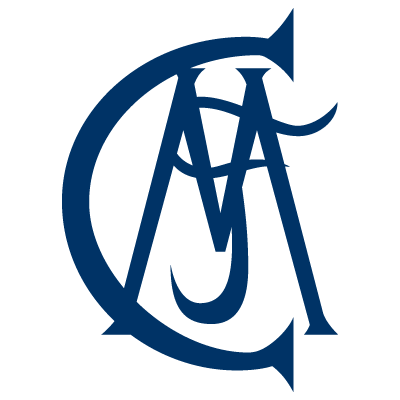
1902

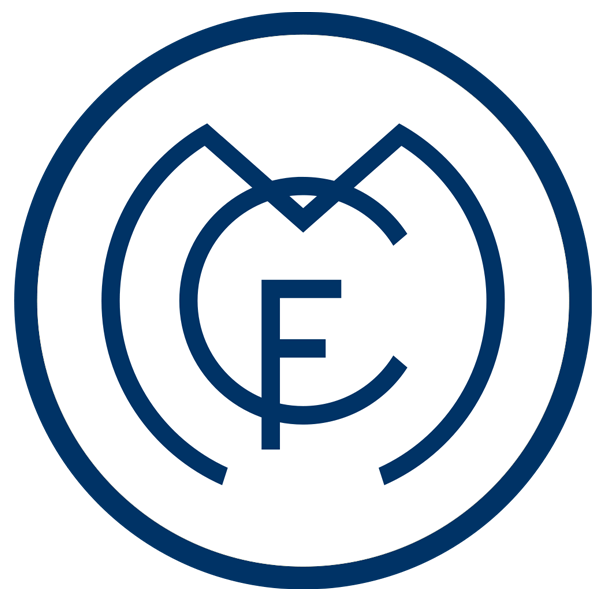
1908

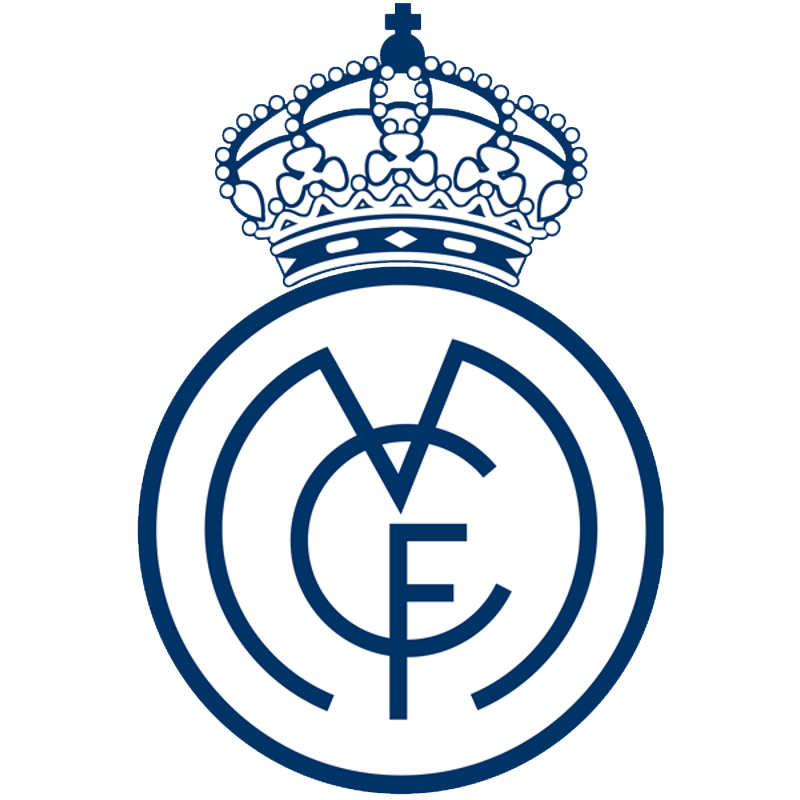
1920

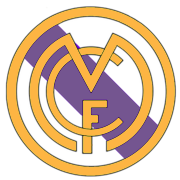
1931

2001

The club’s first crest featured a decorative interlacing of the initials "MCF" (Madrid Club de Fútbol) in dark blue on a plain background. A redesign came when the letters were enclosed inside a circle, creating a more balanced and unified emblem. The next transformation occurred when King Alfonso XIII granted the club royal patronage, adding a crown on top of the badge and formally styling the institution as Real Madrid Club de Fútbol. Following the proclamation of the Second Spanish Republic in 1931, royal symbols were removed, the crown disappeared, and in its place a mulberry diagonal stripe was introduced to represent the historic region of Castile. After the Spanish Civil War, the crown was restored while the Castilian stripe was retained, and the badge adopted a more colourful design with gold details. The most recent significant adjustment came in 2001, when the club modernised the crest for the digital era by refining its lines, brightening the gold, and standardising the colours, including altering the Castilian stripe to a more bluish shade.

Real Madrid Femenino, officially created on 1 July 2020 after the absorption of CD Tacón, adopted the same crest and corporate identity, symbolising its full integration into Real Madrid Club de Fútbol and ensuring visual continuity across all sections of the institution.

== Affiliation with Real Madrid CF ==
Throughout their history, Real Madrid Femenino has maintained a direct institutional affiliation with Real Madrid CF, having been formally integrated into the club’s structure in 2020 following the acquisition and transformation of CD Tacón. Unlike many historically independent women’s teams, the side was incorporated as part of the club’s strategic expansion into women’s football, ensuring full alignment with Real Madrid’s sporting and organisational model from its inception under its current identity.

As an official section of Real Madrid CF, the women’s team shares the club’s corporate structure, resources, and long-term sporting vision. The team benefits from access to professional training facilities, including Ciudad Real Madrid, as well as medical, technical, and administrative support systems. Additionally, Real Madrid Femenino is fully integrated into the club’s global branding, marketing strategies, and digital platforms, reflecting its status as a core component of the club.

== Home ground ==
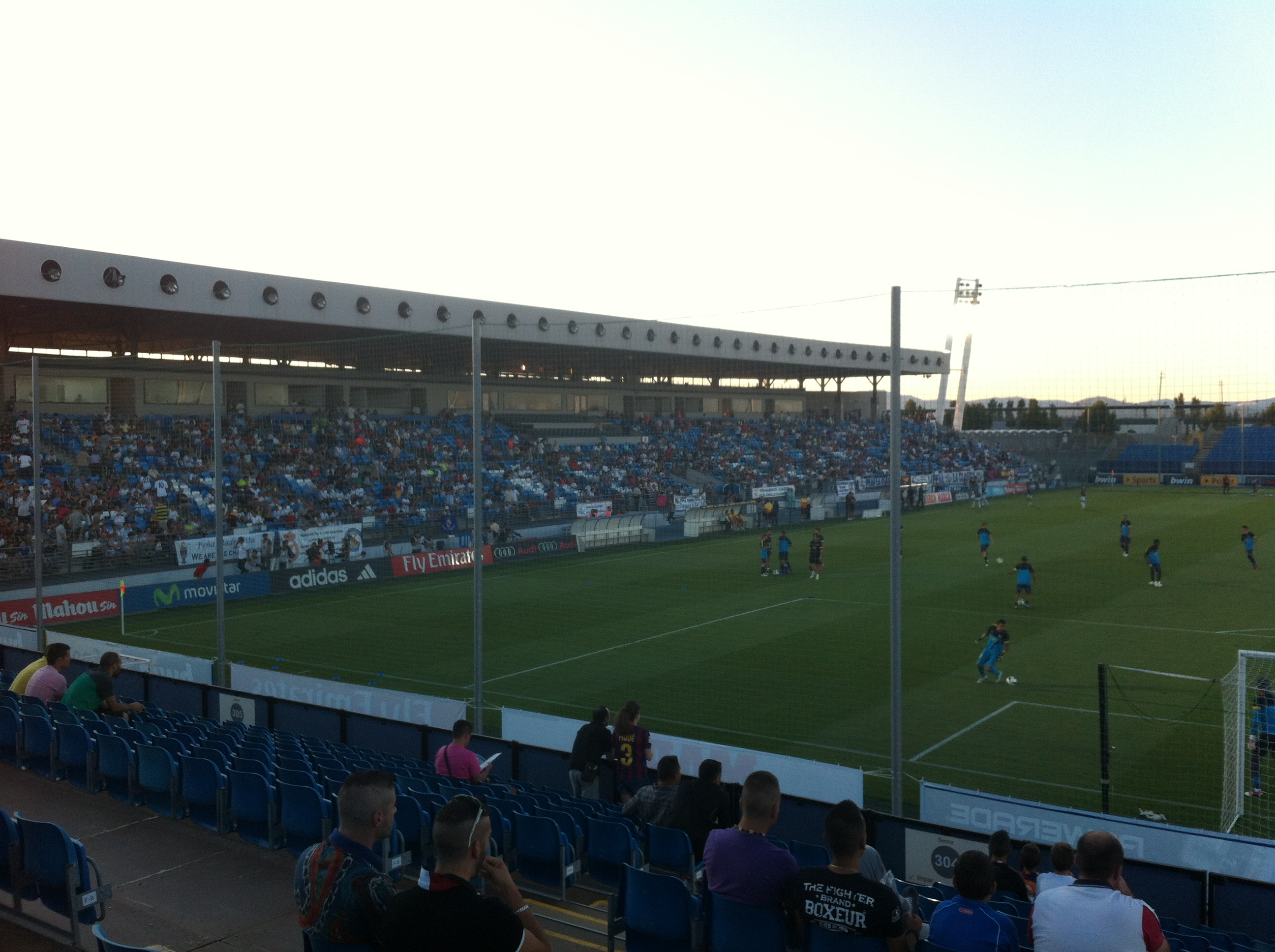
Alfredo Di Stéfano Stadium

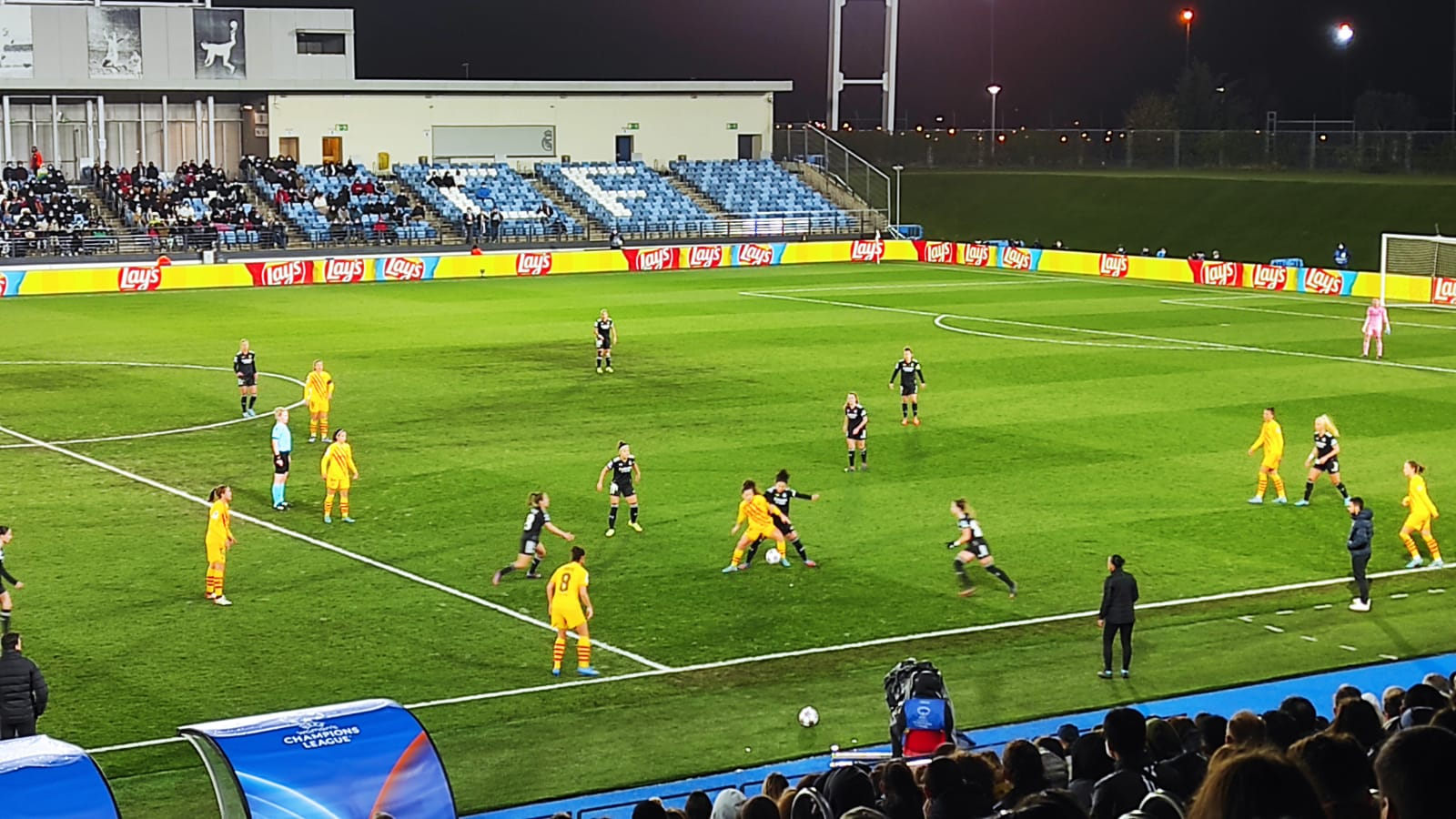
El Clásico being played at Alfredo Di Stéfano Stadium in March 2022

During the transition season, TACÓN played their home fixtures at Field 11 in Ciudad Real Madrid. The matches were not open to the general public, with only club members, selected away fans and those possessing a membership card, allowed to attend. Following the completion of the merger, and given that the senior men's team was using the Estadio Alfredo di Stéfano, Real Madrid Femenino continued to play their home matches at Field 11. At the start of the 2021–22 season, the women's team have alternated between Field 11 and the Alfredo di Stéfano stadium, initially with a reduced capacity for fan attendance.

== Support ==
Real Madrid Femenino shares much of its fanbase with the wider Real Madrid community (Madridistas), while also developing its own identity since its full integration into Real Madrid in mid-2020. The takeover of CD Tacón and rebranding was completed on 1 July 2020, giving the women’s team access to Real Madrid’s infrastructure and wider visibility.

Home matches are primarily held at the Alfredo Di Stéfano Stadium in the club’s Ciudad Real Madrid complex, a venue also shared with Real Madrid Castilla. Crowd sizes have increased in recent seasons, particularly for high-profile matches. For example, in the 2022–23 season, Real Madrid Femenino registered a highest home attendance of 5,126 in a Liga F match vs FC Barcelona.

League-wide data also supports rising support: in Liga F, attendance at stadiums increased by 7 % compared to prior season, while televised audience rose by 90 %. More matches are being held in “main” stadiums rather than smaller or training-complex grounds, enhancing matchday visibility.

Financially, Real Madrid Femenino is among Europe’s leading women’s clubs in revenue: in the 2023-24 season, it earned approximately €10.5 million, putting it in the top 5 for women’s clubs in Deloitte’s “Football Money League – Women.”

Matchday culture shows a mixture of traditions inherited from the wider Real Madrid support (chants, club identity, presence of “Madridistas”) together with growing interest specific to the women’s section. High-profile fixtures draw larger, more diverse crowds. Club communications, social media, televised coverage, and “fan experience” initiatives have also contributed to raising profile and engagement.

== Season to season ==
Season	Division	Place	Copa de la Reina	UEFA Champions League
As CD TACÓN
2016–17	2ª	2nd		
2017–18	2ª	1st		
2018–19	2ª	1st		
2019–20	1ª	10th	Quarter-finals	
As Real Madrid Femenino
2020–21	1ª	2nd	Quarter-finals	
2021–22	1ª	3rd	Semi-finals	Quarter-finals
2022–23	1ª	2nd	Runners-up	Group stage
2023–24	1ª	2nd	Quarter-finals	Group stage
2024–25	1ª	2nd	Semi-finals	Quarter-finals
2025–26	1ª	2nd	Quarter-finals	Quarter-finals

=== 2020–21 ===
The 2020–21 campaign was Real Madrid Femenino's first official season under the Real Madrid name following the full absorption of CD Tacón in July 2020. Under head coach David Aznar, the team rapidly established itself as one of the strongest sides in Spain, finishing second place in the Primera División behind Barcelona, which secured the club's first-ever qualification for European competition. The team also reached the quarter-finals of the Copa de la Reina before being eliminated.

Several players emerged as key figures during the club's inaugural season. Striker Kosovare Asllani was the side’s leading goalscorer, delivering decisive performances including a rapid hat-trick in February 2021, which underlined her importance in attack. Left-back Olga Carmona quickly became a regular starter and contributed both defensively and offensively throughout the campaign. Captain Ivana Andrés, who had joined in the summer of 2020, provided leadership and stability in central defence, while goalkeeper Misa Rodríguez impressed with consistent saves and numerous clean sheets. Veteran defender Babett Peter also contributed valuable experience in what was her final season with the club.

Real Madrid’s debut season in the women’s top flight was widely considered a success, as the club became Barcelona’s closest challenger in the domestic league. The second-place finish represented a major milestone in the short history of the women’s section, laying the foundations for the team’s continued development in Spain and in Europe.

=== 2021–22 ===
The 2021–22 campaign marked the club's debut in European competition. Having finished second in the league the previous year, the team entered the newly expanded UEFA Women's Champions League at the qualifying stage.

Under head coach David Aznar, Real Madrid began their European campaign by defeating Manchester City 2–1 on aggregate in the second qualifying round, a result described in the press as historic as it secured the club's place in the group stage of the competition. Drawn in Group B alongside Paris Saint-Germain, Breiðablik and Kharkiv, the Spanish side advanced to the quarter-finals after finishing second in the group with four wins. Their run ended in the last eight against reigning champions Barcelona, who won the tie 8–3 on aggregate.

In domestic competition, Real Madrid endured a difficult start in the Primera División and at one point sat outside the top five. In December 2021, after a series of poor results, Aznar was dismissed and replaced by Alberto Toril. Under Toril, results improved dramatically and the team climbed the table, ultimately finishing third in the league to secure a return to European competition.

The Copa de la Reina saw Real Madrid reach the semi-finals, where they were eliminated by Sporting Huelva in extra time.

A number of players stood out during the season. Athenea del Castillo impressed with her pace and creativity on the wing. Goalkeeper Misa Rodríguez was again a decisive presence between the posts, and striker Esther González contributed crucial goals following her arrival from Levante.

Overall, the season was regarded as a landmark for Real Madrid Femenino. Their successful European debut, recovery in the domestic league under Toril, and progress to the semi-finals of the Copa de la Reina demonstrated the rapid growth of the team and consolidated their position as one of the top clubs in Spain and Europe.

=== 2022–23 ===
The 2022–23 campaign coincided with the first fully professional Liga F season, and under manager Alberto Toril Real Madrid confirmed their status as genuine title challengers by finishing second in the league behind FC Barcelona.

Real Madrid combined domestic consistency with a deep Cup run. The side reached their first Copa de la Reina final, where they drew 2–2 with Atlético Madrid after extra time but lost the title in the subsequent penalty shootout, denying Real Madrid their first major trophy to that point. The team also took part in the Supercopa de España, reaching the final four before being eliminated by Barcelona in the semi-final stage.

In continental competition Real Madrid participated in the UEFA Women's Champions League but did not progress beyond the newly expanded group stage, defending their place among Europe’s regular participants while highlighting the gap to the continent’s very elite sides.

The 2022 summer transfer window was the club’s most significant to date. Real Madrid signed Scotland international Caroline Weir (from Manchester City) as a marquee midfield/attacking signing; French forward Naomie Feller, Brazilian centre-back Kathellen, French midfielder Sandie Toletti and Swedish midfielder Freja Olofsson also arrived to strengthen the squad. In February 2023 Real Madrid completed the high-profile signing of Colombian forward Linda Caicedo, who made an immediate impact after joining from Deportivo Cali.

On the pitch Caroline Weir was the club’s top scorer in the league, with 19 Liga F goals and finished the season as Real Madrid’s leading scorer in all competitions (28 goals), providing the goals and the impetus that powered Madrid’s domestic challenge. Forward Esther González provided complementary goals return (16 league goals), while the emergence of younger players and midseason additions (notably Linda Caicedo) added attacking options and excitement for supporters. Statistically the team league campaign won, scoring 80 goals and conceding 25 in Liga F, and produced several results including a 7–1 win over Alavés; overall the season showed both attacking potency and the squad depth that would be needed to compete on multiple fronts in subsequent years.

=== 2023–24 ===
The 2023–24 season saw Real Madrid Femenino consolidate their place among Spain's leading sides while continuing to build experience in European competition. Coached by Alberto Toril, the team finished second in Liga F for the third consecutive campaign, once again playing the role of Barcelona’s primary domestic challenger and securing qualification for the following season's UEFA Women's Champions League.

In the UEFA Women's Champions League Real Madrid faced a demanding group and were unable to progress from the group stage, an exit that underlined both the progress the club has made on the continental stage and the remaining gap to Europe's elite teams.

Domestically the club had mixed fortunes in cup competitions. Real Madrid were eliminated before the Copa de la Reina final after a tightly contested tie, and they also exited the Supercopa de España Femenina at the semi-final stage; these results reflected the increasingly competitive nature of Spanish women’s football and the narrow margins that separate the top clubs.

Individually, the squad benefitted from a blend of experienced internationals and emerging talent. Caroline Weir provided creativity and goals from midfield, while forwards such as Signe Bruun and Naomie Feller contributed important scoring returns across competitions; Athenea del Castillo reaffirmed her importance to the side by committing her future to the club with a contract renewal, and Misa Rodríguez remained a dependable presence in goal.

=== 2024–25 ===
The 2024–25 season was another strong campaign for Real Madrid Femenino under manager Alberto Toril, further consolidating the club among Spain's top teams and increasing their impact in European competition. The squad underwent several departures before the season began, including first captain Ivana Andrés, Claudia Zornoza, Kenti Robles, Sofie Svava, Kathellen, Freja Olofsson, and Hayley Raso, while signings such as Filippa Angeldahl were brought in to refresh the midfield.

In Liga F Real Madrid again finished in 2nd place, behind Barcelona, maintaining their status as the primary challengers domestically. A landmark moment came on 23 March 2025, when Real Madrid secured their first ever victory over Barcelona (1–3) in an official match, with goals by Alba Redondo and a Caroline Weir double.

In domestic cup competitions, Real Madrid were runners-up in the Supercopa de España Femenina, losing to Barcelona in the final. In the Copa de la Reina, they reached the semi-finals.

In the UEFA Women’s Champions League Real Madrid also registered a strong run, making it to the quarter-finals. They secured important group-stage wins (including over Twente) which saw them advance from the group. Alba Redondo was the club’s league top scorer with 15 goals and added up to 20 in all competitions, making her the season’s top scorer as well.

== Record in UEFA Women's Champions League ==
All results (home, away and aggregate) list Real Madrid's goal tally first.

Season	Round	Club	Home	Away	Aggregate
2021–22	QR2	(England) Manchester City	1–1	1–0	2–1
2021–22	Group stage	(Ukraine) Zhytlobud Kharkiv	3–0	1–0	2nd
2021–22	Group stage	(Iceland) Breiðablik	5–0	3–0	2nd
2021–22	Group stage	(France) Paris Saint-Germain	0–2	0–4	2nd
2021–22	Quarter-finals	(Spain) Barcelona	1–3	2–5	3–8
2022–23	QR1	(Austria) Sturm Graz	6–0		
2022–23	QR1	(England) Manchester City	1–0		
2022–23	QR2	(Norway) Rosenborg	3–0	2–1	5–1
2022–23	Group stage	(France) Paris Saint-Germain	0–0	1–2	3rd
2022–23	Group stage	(England) Chelsea	1–1	0–2	3rd
2022–23	Group stage	(Albania) Vllaznia Shkodër	5–1	2–0	3rd
2023–24	QR2	(Norway) Vålerenga Fotball	2–1	3–0	5–1
2023–24	Group stage	(England) Chelsea	2–2	1–2	4th
2023–24	Group stage	(Sweden) BK Häcken	0–1	1–2	4th
2023–24	Group stage	(France) Paris FC	0–1	1–2	4th
2024–25	QR2	(Portugal) Sporting CP	3–1	2–1	5–2
2024–25	Group stage	(England) Chelsea	1–2	2–3	2nd
2024–25	Group stage	(Netherlands) Twente	7–0	3–2	2nd
2024–25	Group stage	(Scotland) Celtic	4–0	3–0	2nd
2024–25	Quarter-finals	(England) Arsenal	2–0	0–3	2–3
2025–26	QR3	(Germany) Eintracht Frankfurt	3–1	2–1	5–1
2025–26	League phase	(Italy) Roma	6–2		7th
2025–26	League phase	(France) Paris Saint-Germain	2–1 ^{a}		7th
2025–26	League phase	(France) Paris FC	1–1		7th
2025–26	League phase	(England) Arsenal	1–2 ^{a}		7th
2025–26	League phase	(Germany) VfL Wolfsburg	2–0		7th
2025–26	League phase	(Netherlands) Twente	1–1 ^{a}		7th
2025–26	K.O. phase play-offs	(France) Paris FC	3–2 ^{a}	2-0	5–2
2025–26	Quarter-finals	(Spain) Barcelona	2–6	0–6^{a}	2–12
2026-27	QR 3	(Netherlands) AFC Ajax	2-0^{a}	2–1	4–1

^{a} Away game

== UEFA club coefficient ranking ==
As of 5 May 2026

Rank	Team	Points
6	(Germany) VfL Wolfsburg	73.000
7	(France) PSG	63.000
8	(Spain) Real Madrid	60.500
9	(Italy) Juventus	51.250
10	(Italy) AS Roma	42.000

Since being officially rebranded as Real Madrid Femenino in 2020, the club has experienced a rapid rise both domestically and in Europe. In their first full season (2020–21), Madrid finished second in the Primera División, which secured qualification for the UEFA Women's Champions League for the first time. The club established itself quickly as a regular Champions League participant, reaching the group stage in 2021–22 and later advancing to the quarter-finals in 2024–25.

This progress has been reflected in UEFA's club coefficients, which ranks clubs based on their results over a five-year period. From not having any coefficient points prior to 2020, Real Madrid rapidly climbed the ranking table. As of May 2026, the club stood 8th in Europe. The ascent is regarded as one of the fastest among elite women’s clubs, with Madrid benefitting from consistent top-two domestic finishes, high-profile player recruitment, and increasing experience in European competition. Their position within the top ten of UEFA's coefficient ranking is considered a sign of their growing stature and influence in women’s football, ensuring better seeding in future continental campaigns and cementing their reputation as one of the emerging powers of the game.

== Players ==
=== Current squad ===
As of 25 August 2026.

Note: Flags indicate national team as defined under FIFA eligibility rules; some limited exceptions apply. Players may hold more than one non-FIFA nationality.

No.	Pos.	Nation	Player
1	GK	GER	Merle Frohms
2	DF	ESP	Noe Bejarano
3	DF	NED	Janou Levels
4	DF	ESP	Silvia Cristóbal
5	FW	ESP	Paula Comendador
6	MF	FRA	Sandie Toletti
7	FW	NED	Lotte Keukelaar
8	MF	GER	Sara Däbritz
9	FW	DEN	Signe Bruun
10	FW	ESP	Athenea del Castillo (captain)
11	FW	NED	Lineth Beerensteyn
12	FW	SWE	Felicia Schröder

No.	Pos.	Nation	Player
13	GK	ESP	Laia López
14	DF	ESP	María Méndez
15	MF	ESP	Irune Dorado
16	MF	SWE	Filippa Angeldahl
17	MF	POR	Andreia Jacinto
18	FW	COL	Linda Caicedo
19	DF	ESP	Eva Navarro
20	MF	GER	Elisa Senß
21	DF	DEN	Sara Holmgaard
22	DF	SWE	Bella Andersson
23	DF	FRA	Maëlle Lakrar
24	MF	ITA	Arianna Caruso

=== Notable players ===
This section lists players who have appeared in least 100 matches or scored at least 35 goals for the club.

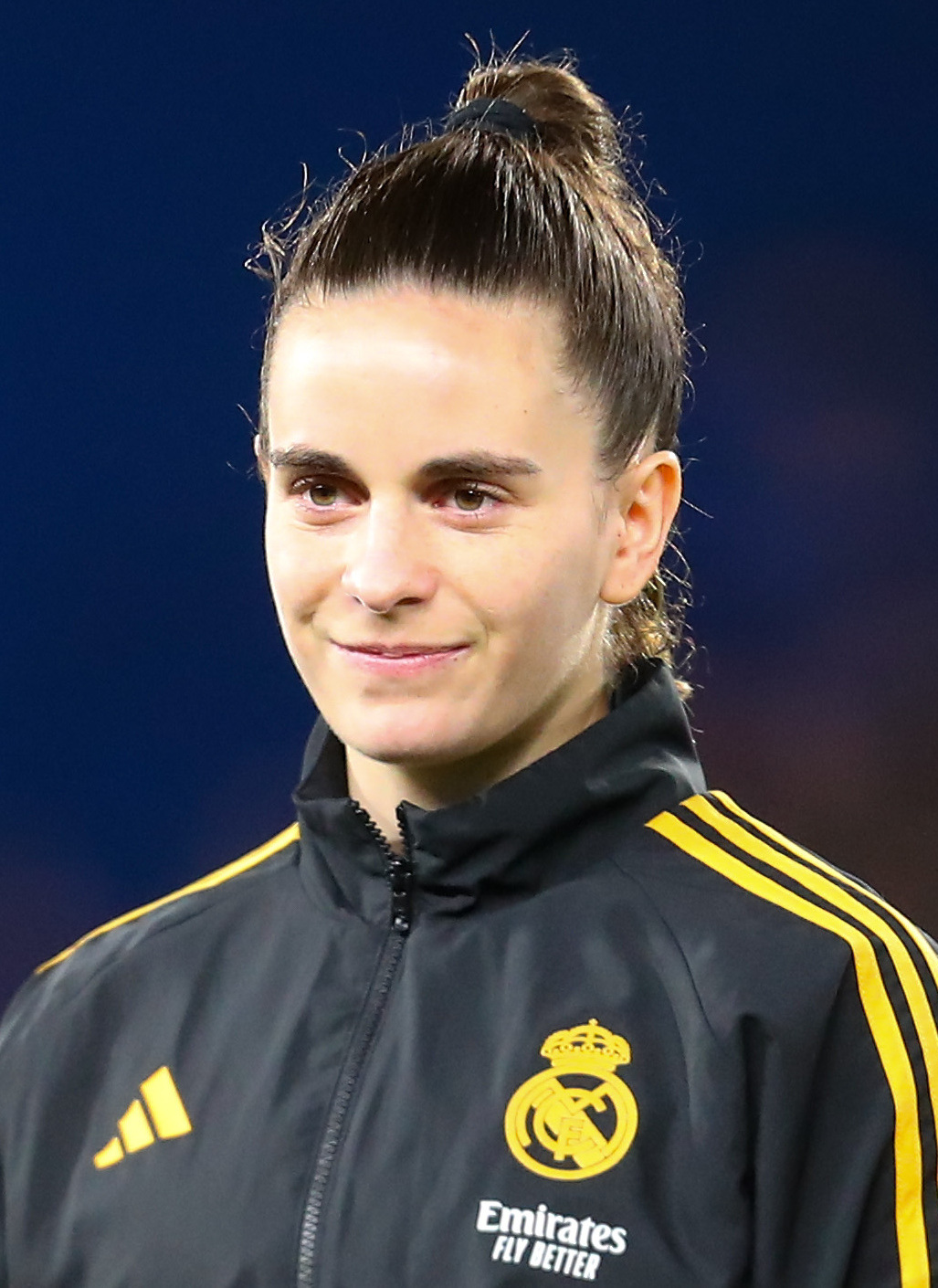
Teresa Abelleira

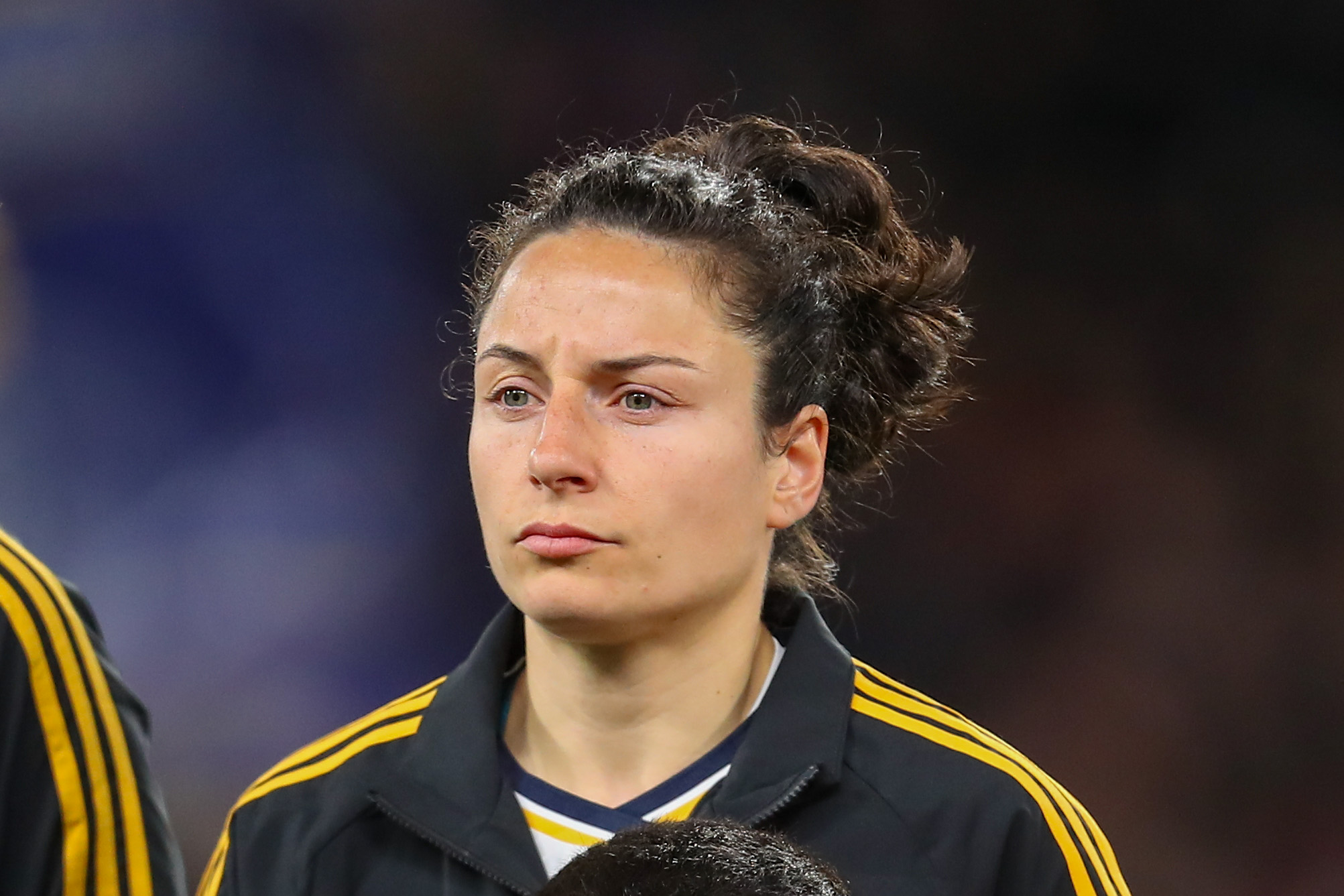
Ivana Andrés

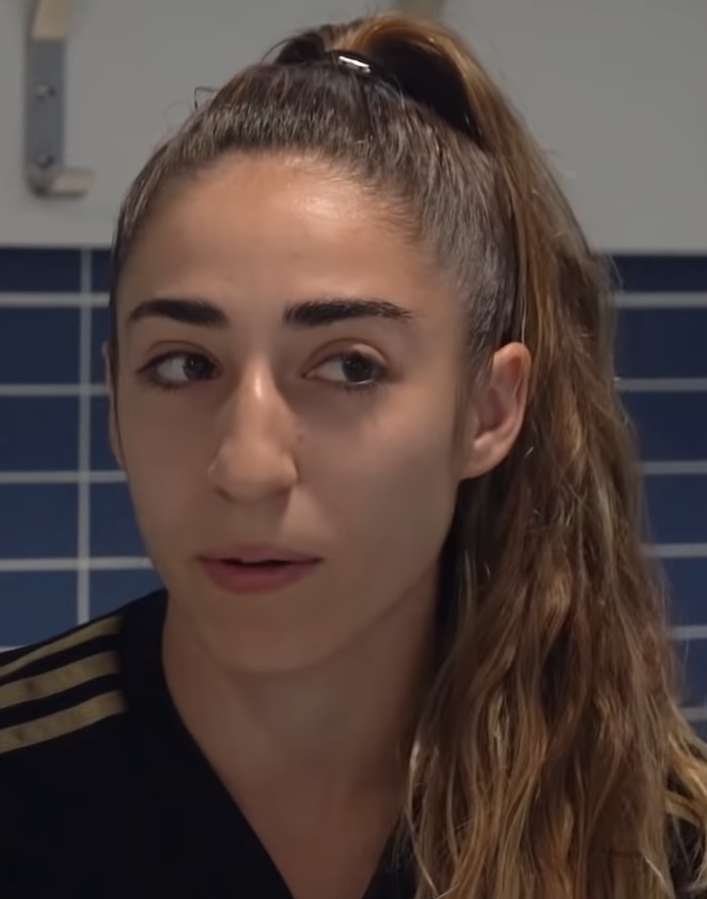
Olga Carmona

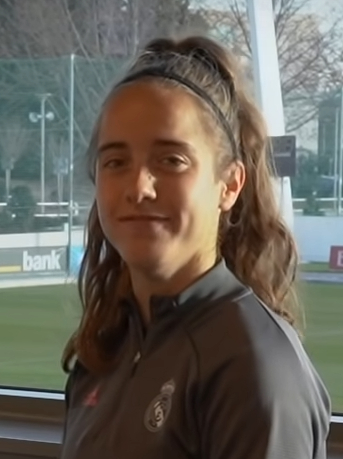
Maite Oroz

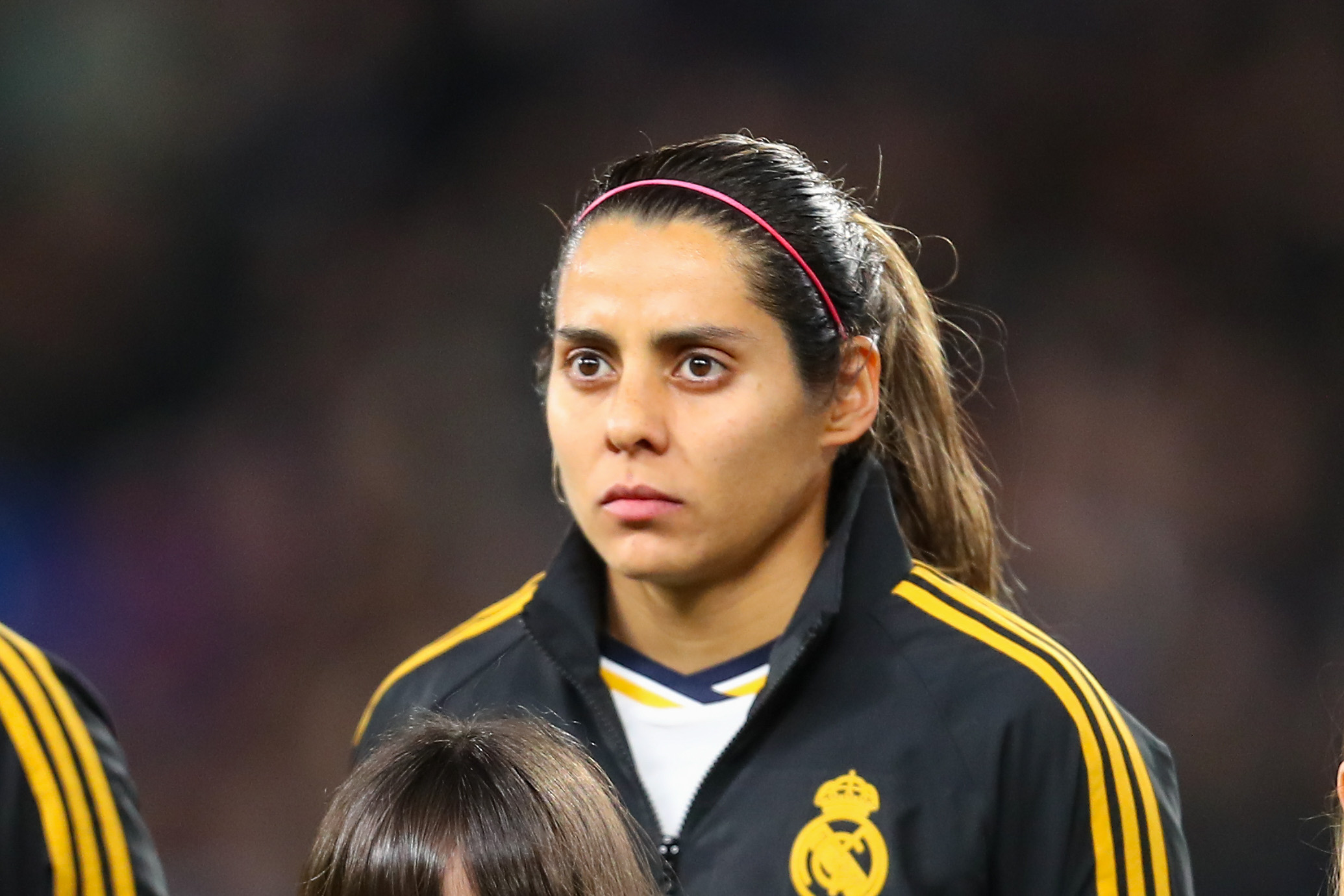
Kenti Robles

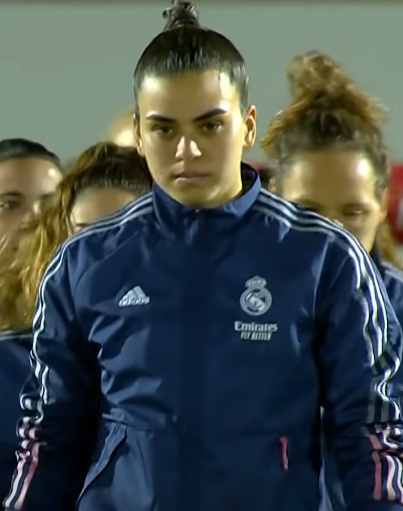
Misa Rodríguez

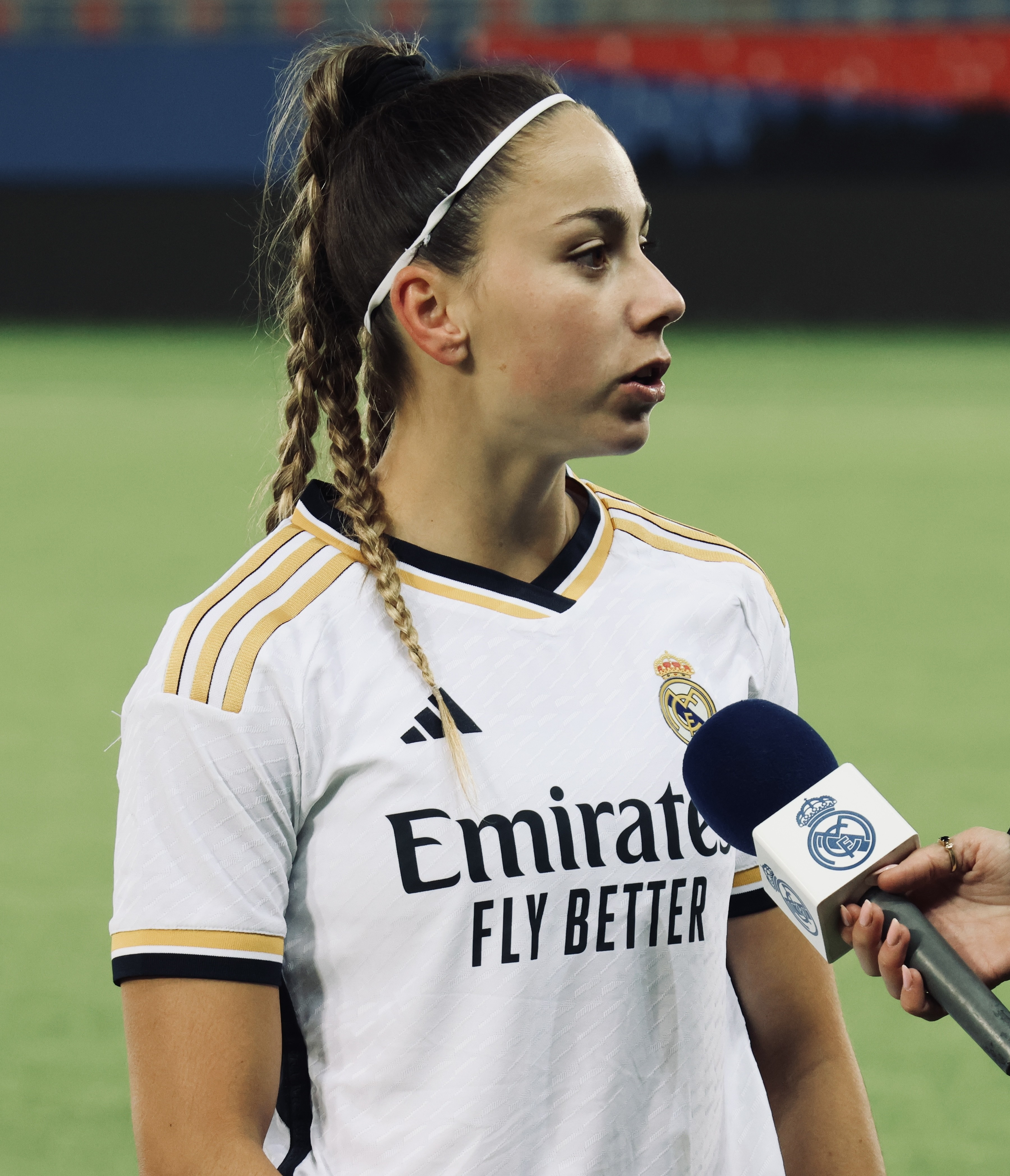
Athenea Del Castillo

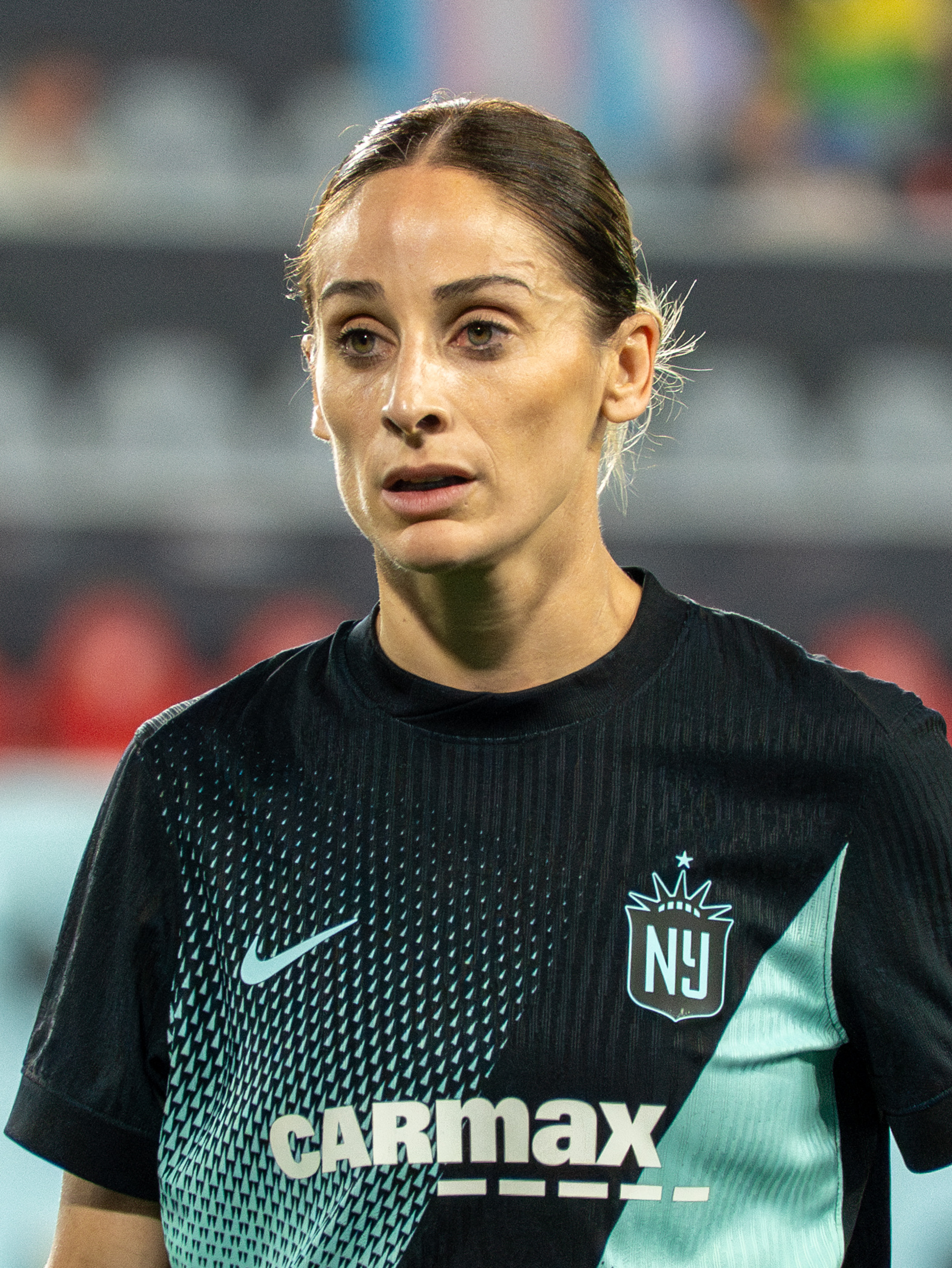
Esther González

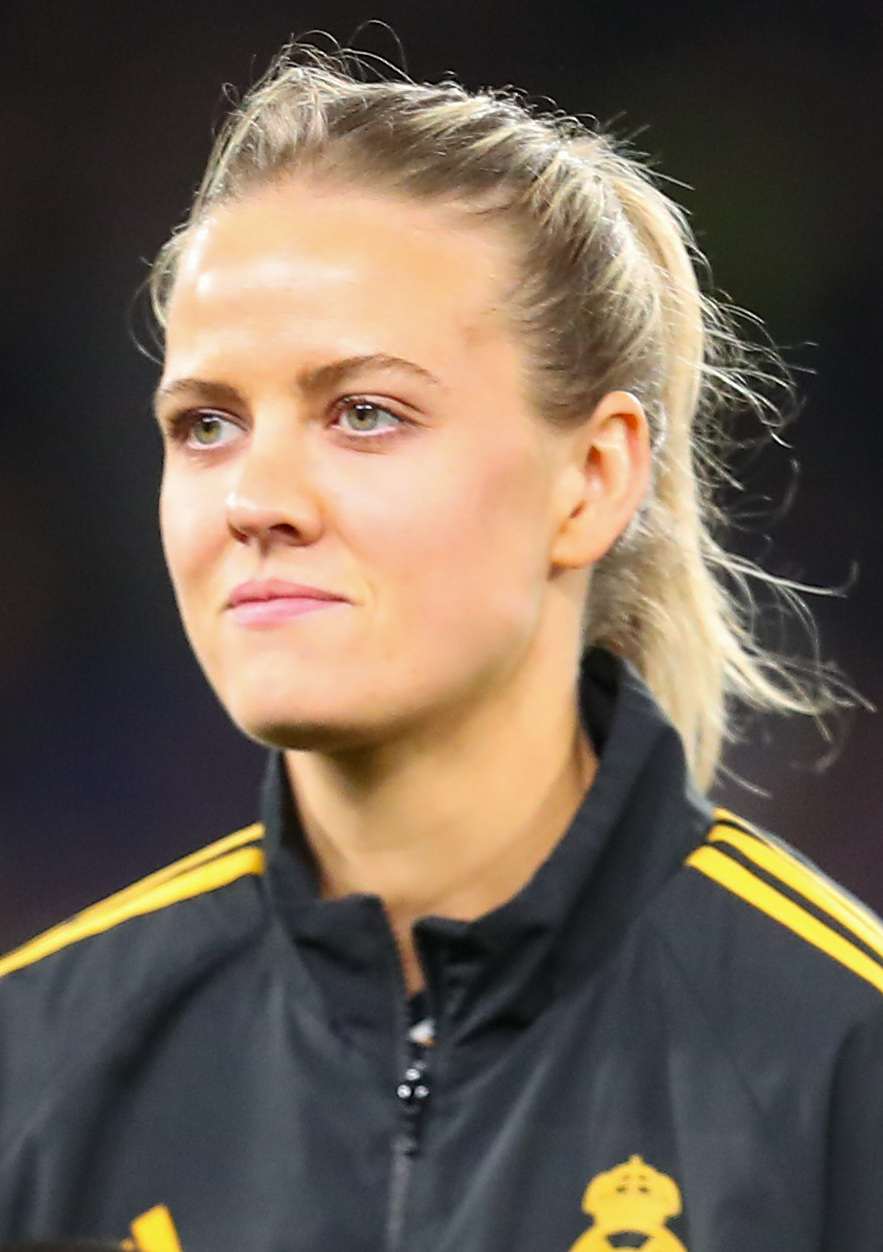
Caroline Møller

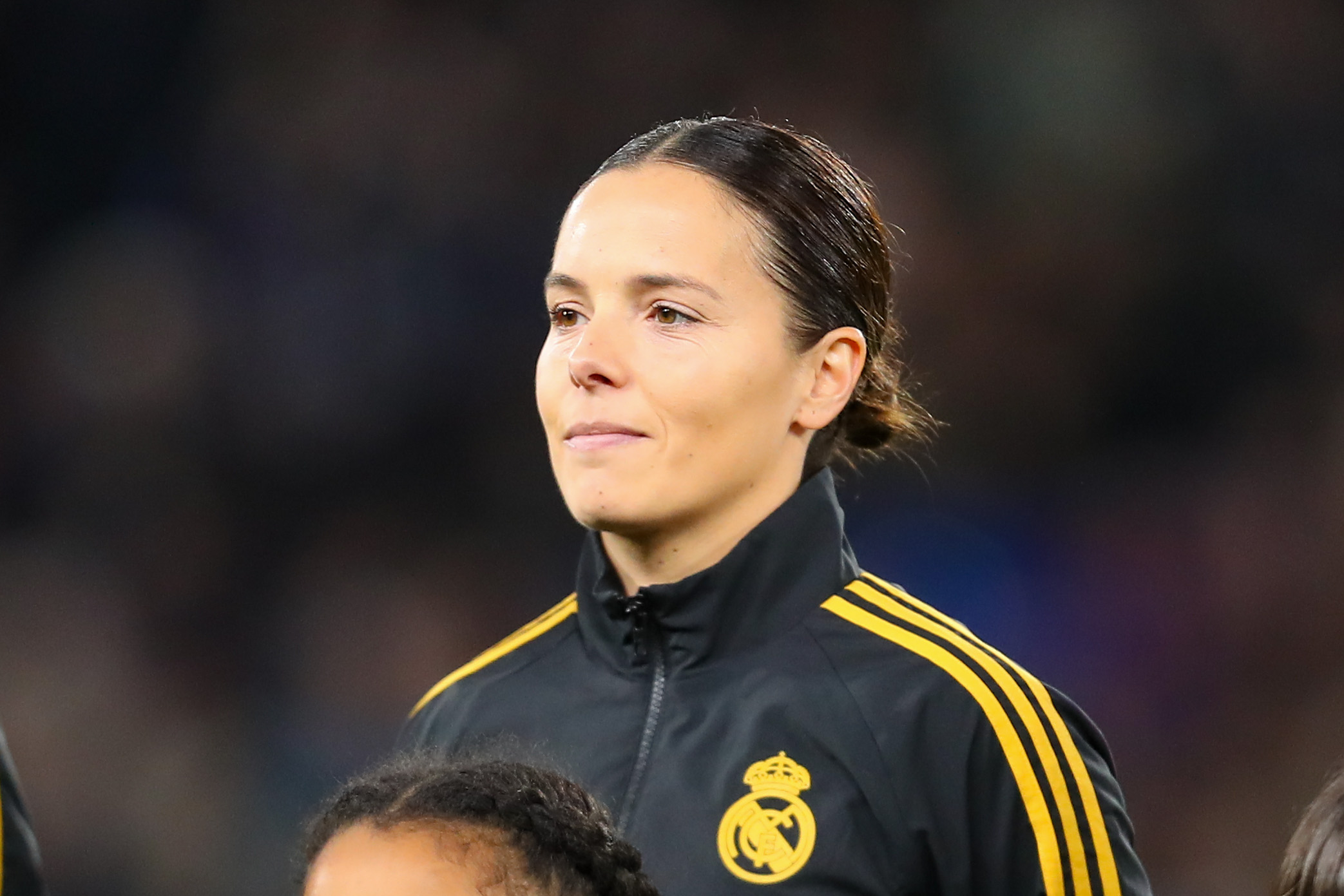
Claudia Zornoza

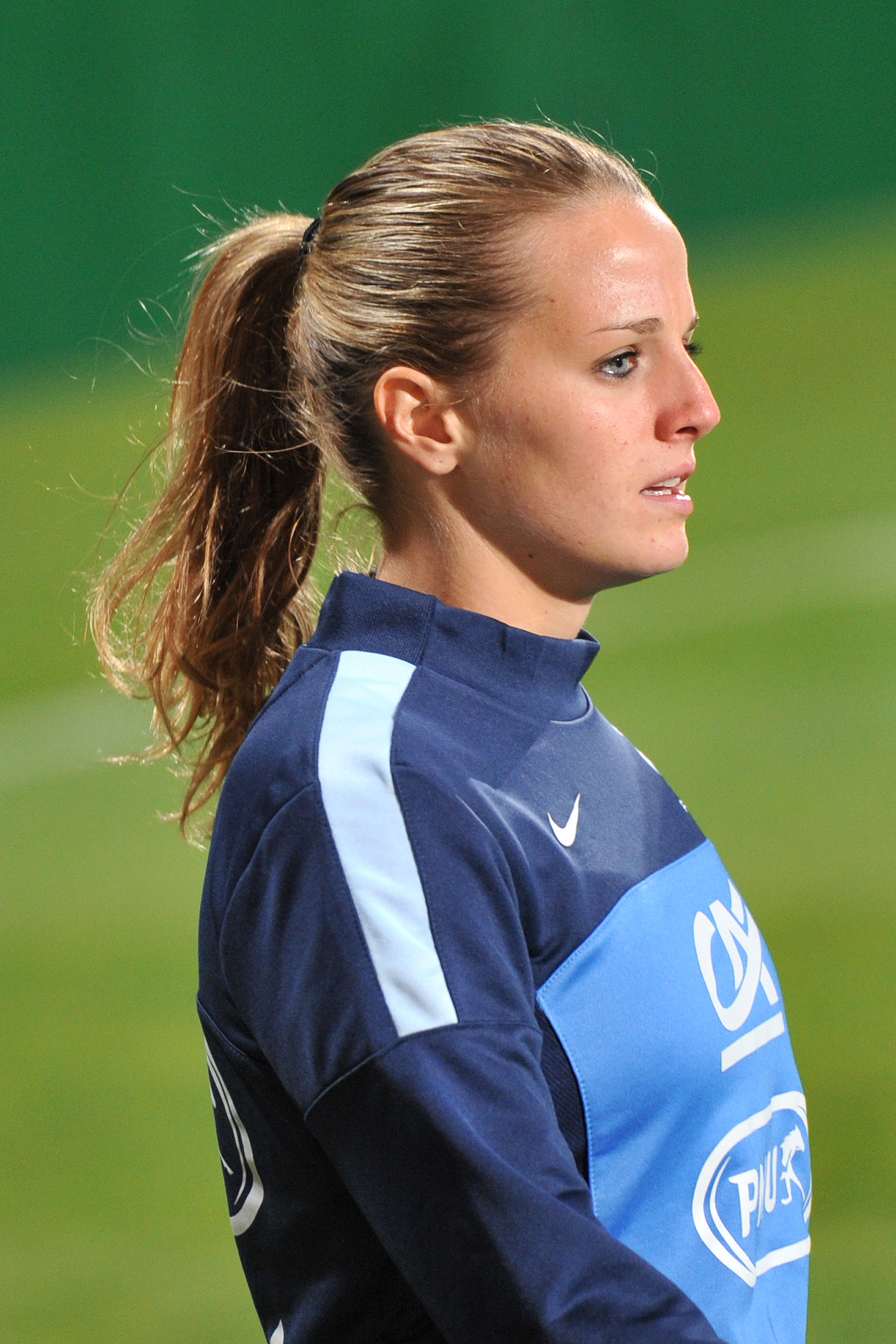
Sandie Toletti

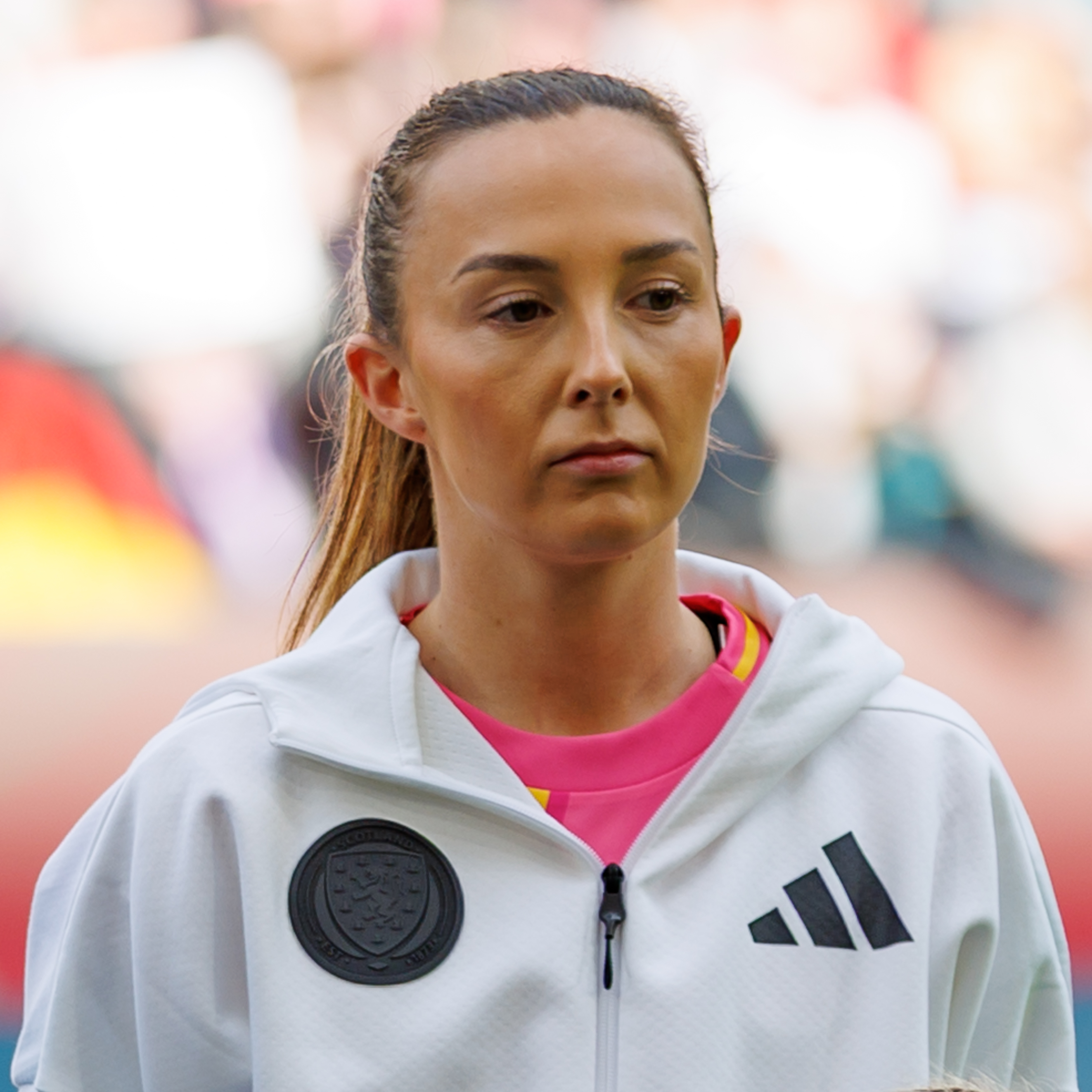
Caroline Weir

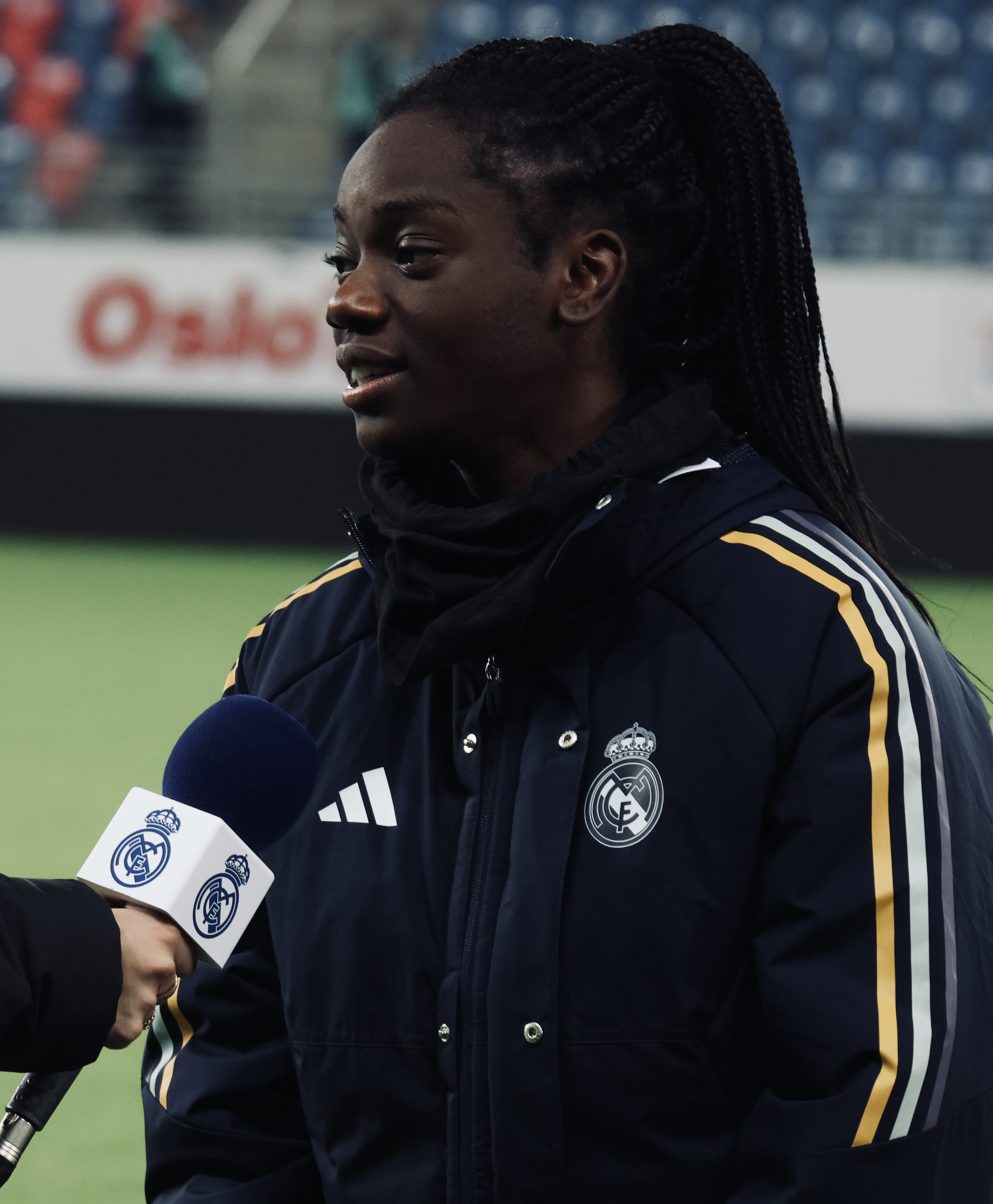
Naomie Feller

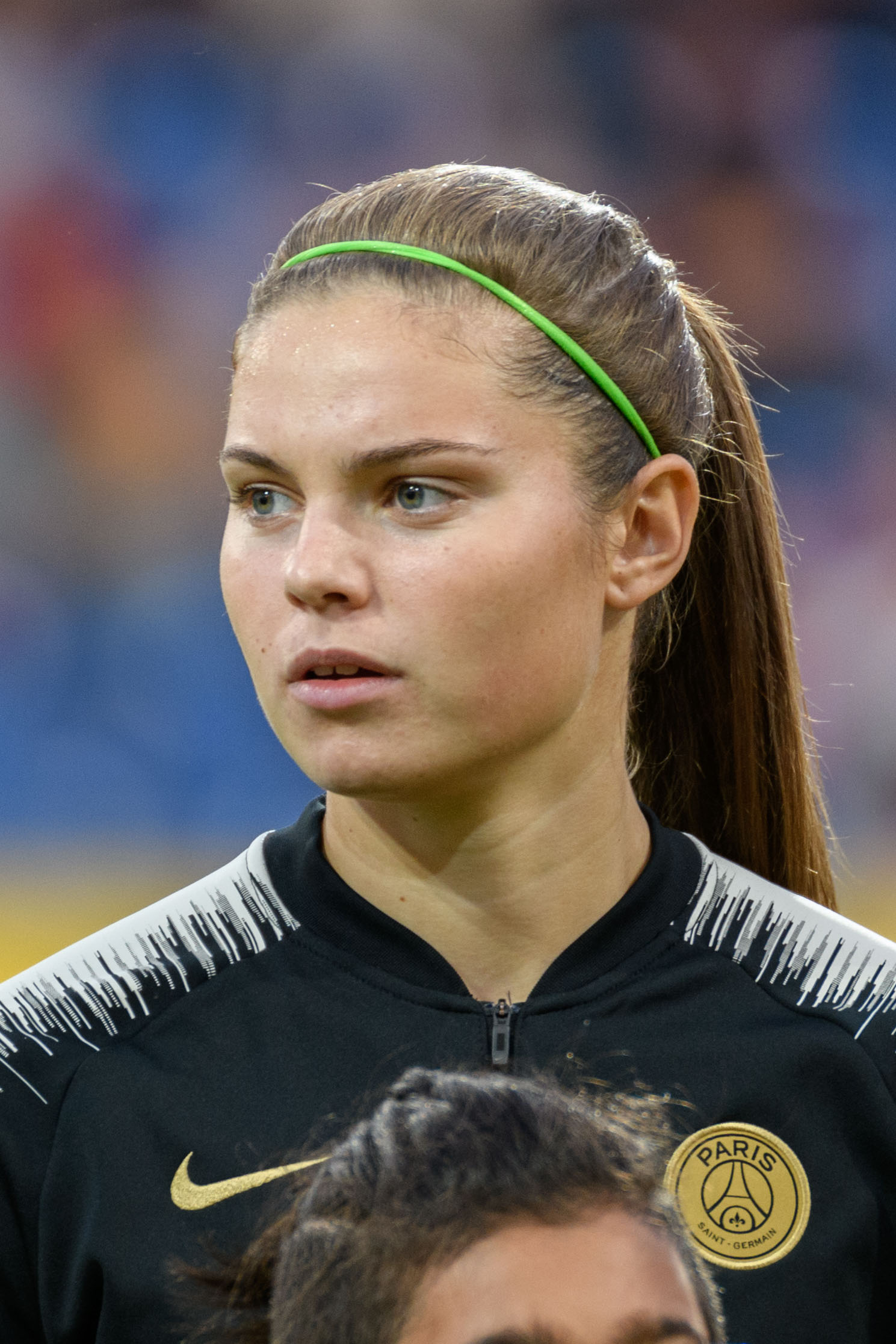
Signe Bruun

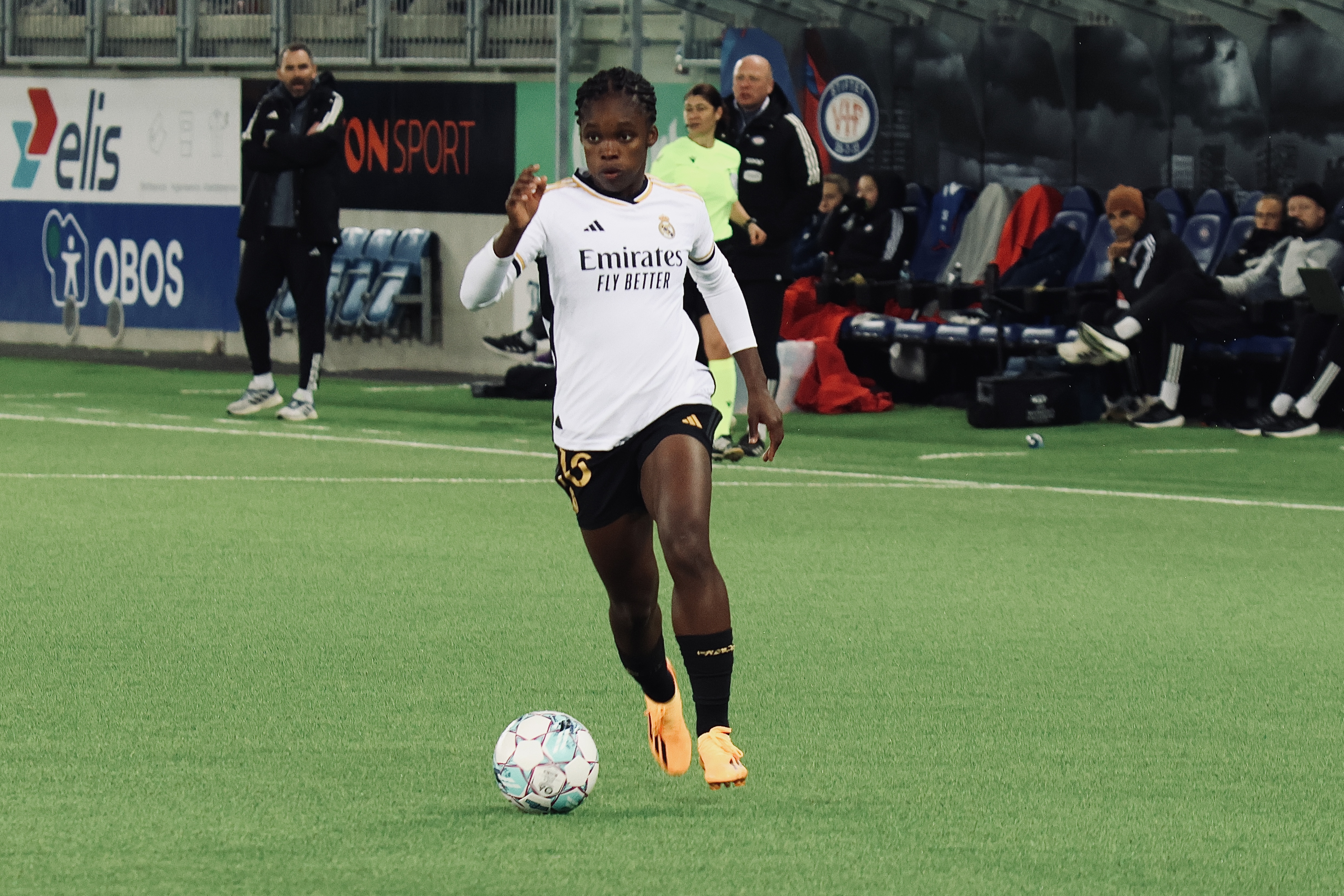
Linda Caicedo
- (Spain) Teresa Abelleira (2020–26)
- (Spain) Ivana Andrés (2020–24)
- (Spain) Olga Carmona (2020–25)
- (Spain) Maite Oroz (2020–24)
- (Mexico) Kenti Robles (2020–24)
- (Spain) Misa Rodríguez (2020–26)
- (Spain) **Athenea del Castillo** (2021–)
- (Spain) Esther González (2021–23)
- (Denmark) Caroline Møller (2021–25)
- (Spain) Claudia Zornoza (2021–24)
- (Spain) Rocío Gálvez (2021–26)
- (France) **Sandie Toletti** (2022–)
- (Scotland) Caroline Weir (2022–26)
- (France) Naomie Feller (2022–26)
- (Denmark) **Signe Bruun** (2023–)
- (Colombia) **Linda Caicedo** (2023–)

==== FIFA World Cup participants ====
List of players that were called up for a FIFA Women's World Cup while playing for Real Madrid. In brackets, the tournament played:

- (Argentina) Ruth Bravo (2019)
- (Spain) Teresa Abelleira (2023)
- (Spain) Ivana Andrés (2023)
- (Colombia) **Linda Caicedo** (2023)
- (Spain) Olga Carmona (2023)
- (Spain) **Athenea del Castillo** (2023)
- (France) Naomie Feller (2023)
- (Spain) Rocío Gálvez (2023)
- (Spain) Esther González (2023)
- (Brazil) Kathellen (2023)
- (Spain) Misa Rodríguez (2023)
- (Denmark) Sofie Svava (2023)
- (France) **Sandie Toletti** (2023)
- (Spain) Claudia Zornoza (2023)

=== Records and statistics ===
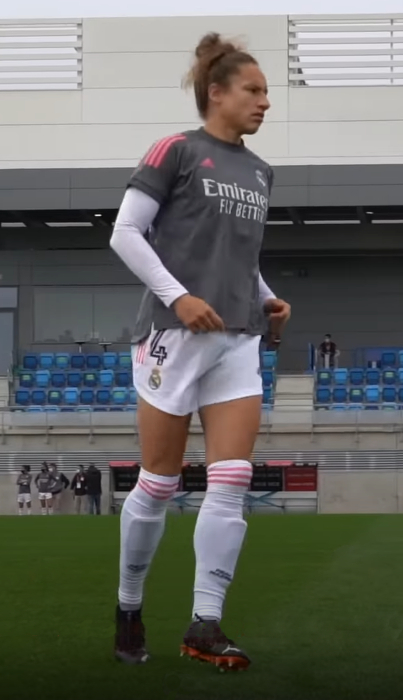
Babett Peter in 2021

Misa Rodríguez stands as Real Madrid’s all-time appearance leader, amassing 213 matches between 2020 and 2025. Just behind her is Athenea del Castillo on 211, and Olga Carmona on 186. Athenea is still at the club.

Caroline Weir (2022–2026) is Real Madrid’s all-time leading goalscorer with 62 goals, follow by Athenea del Castillo (2021–) with 41 goals, while Esther González (2021–2023), Signe Bruun (2023–) and Linda Caicedo (2022–), have each surpassed the 30-goal mark.

Babett Peter is often regarded as a pioneering figure in the history of Real Madrid Femenino. Having joined the club in its inaugural season following the absorption of CD Tacón in 2020, she brought with her extensive international experience as a FIFA Women's World Cup winner and UEFA Women's Champions League champion. Her presence provided leadership and professionalism to a newly formed squad, while serving as a mentor for younger players such as Olga Carmona, Teresa Abelleira, Misa Rodríguez and Athenea del Castillo. Although she retired in 2022 after only two seasons, Peter is remembered as one of the foundational figures of the team and received a farewell tribute from the club recognising her as one of its captains.

==== Top 10 goalscorers ====
- Active players in **bold**, statistics correct as of 27 May 2026.

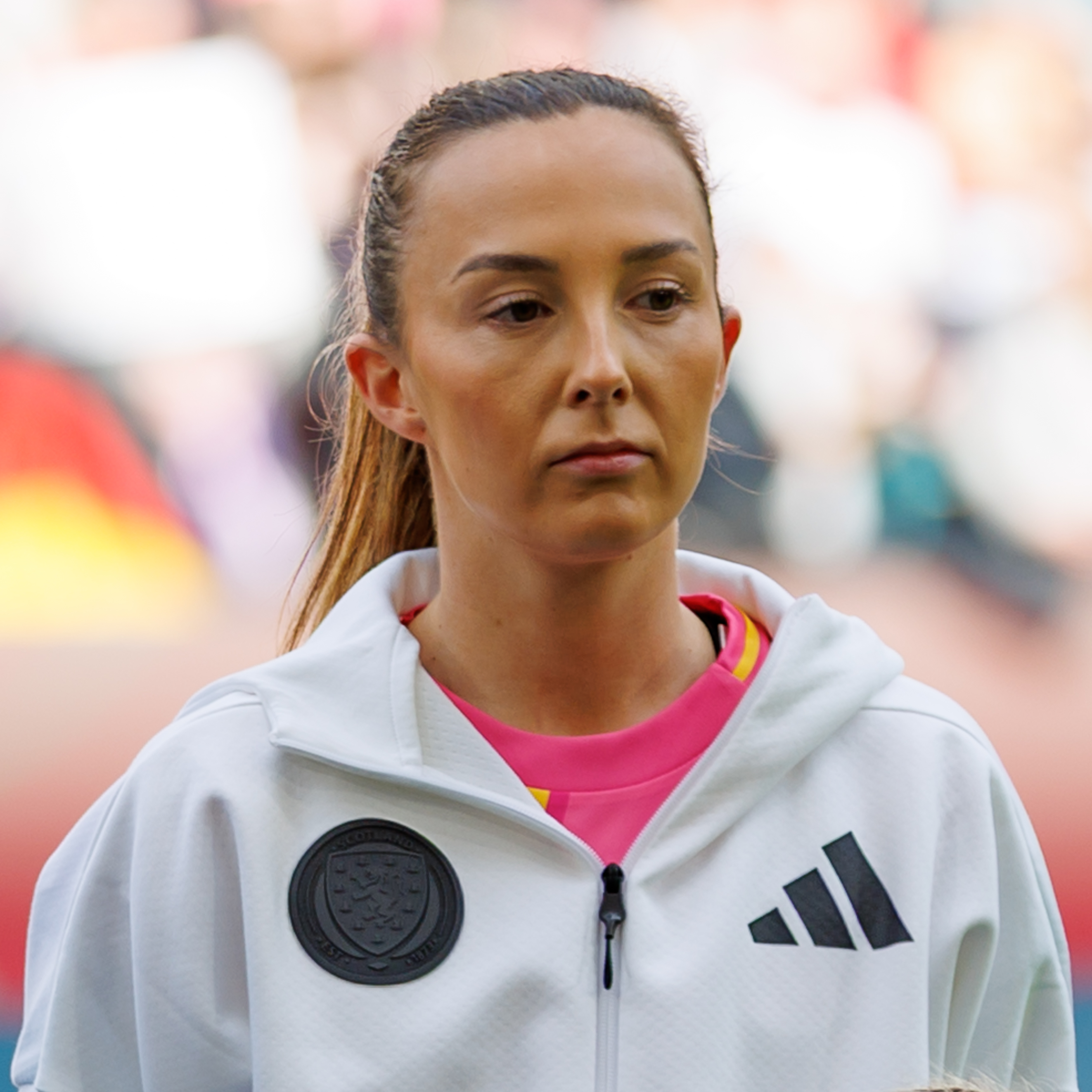
Caroline Weir is Real Madrid's record goalscorer

#	Player	Years	Goals
1	(Scotland) Caroline Weir	(2022–26)	62
2	(Spain) **Athenea del Castillo**	(2021–)	41
3	(Spain) Esther González	(2021–23)	39
4	(Denmark) **Signe Bruun**	(2023–)	37
5	(Colombia) **Linda Caicedo**	(2022–)	36
6	(Spain) **Alba Redondo**	(2024–)	30
7	(Spain) Olga Carmona	(2020–25)	28
8	(Denmark) Caroline Møller	(2021–25)	27
9	(France) Naomie Feller	(2022–26)	25
10	(Sweden) Kosovare Asllani	(2019–22)	23

==== Top 10 most appearances ====
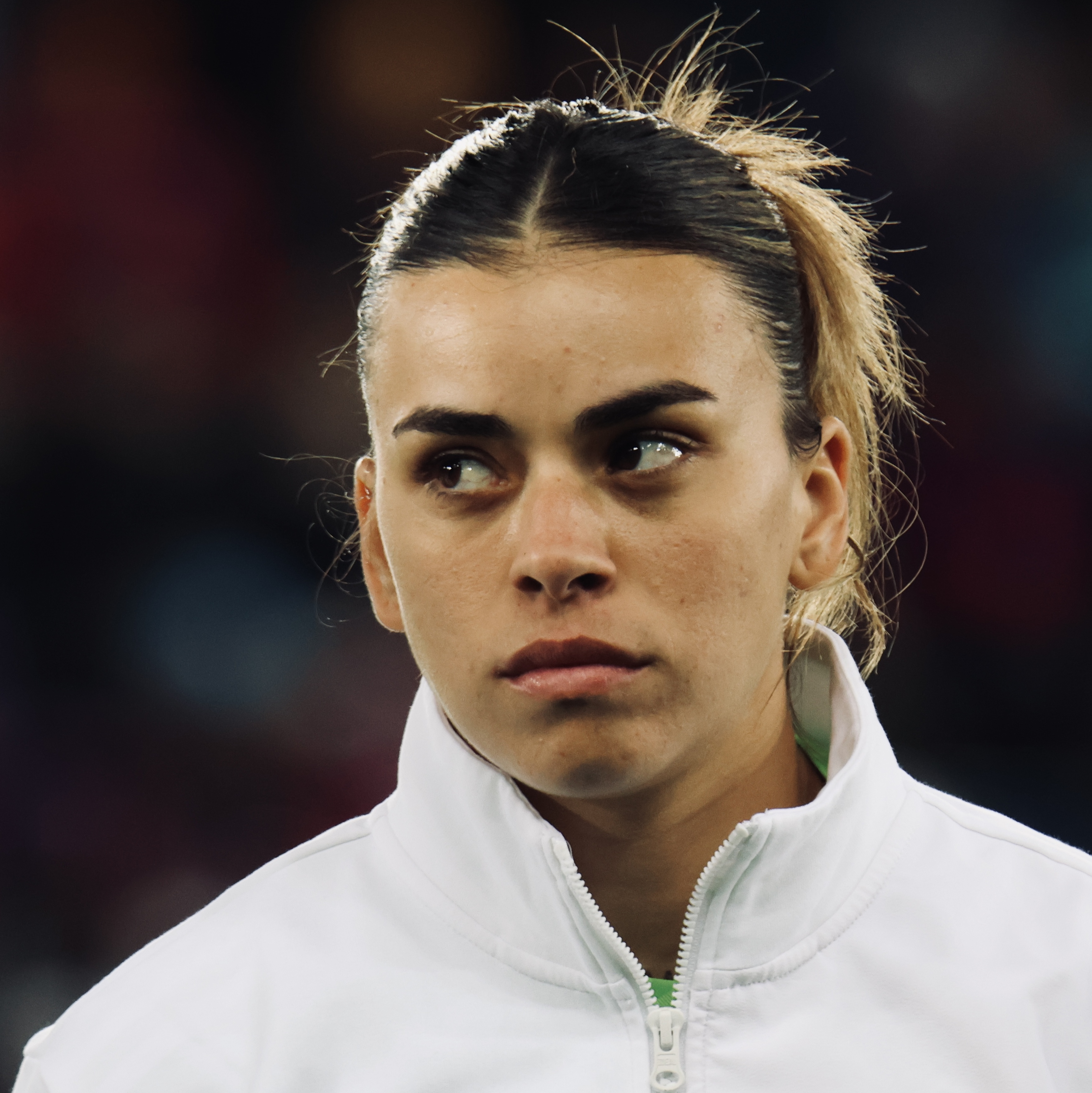
Misa Rodríguez is Real Madrid's all-time leader in appearances

#	Player	Years	Matches
1	(Spain) Misa Rodríguez	(2020–26)	215
2	(Spain) **Athenea del Castillo**	(2021–)	212
3	(Spain) Olga Carmona	(2020–25)	186
4	(Spain) Teresa Abelleira	(2020–26)	170
5	(Spain) Maite Oroz	(2020–24)	146
6	(Spain) Ivana Andrés	(2020–24)	137
7	(France) Naomie Feller	(2022–26)	135
8	(France) **Sandie Toletti**	(2022–)	132
9	(Spain) Rocío Gálvez	(2021–26)	131
10	(Mexico) Kenti Robles	(2020–24)	123

=== Milestones ===
This section highlights the players who have reached each successive 10-goal milestone in the history of Real Madrid Femenino, based exclusively on goals scored in official matches. It documents the first player to score the club’s 10th, 20th, 30th goal, and so on, providing a chronological record of key scoring landmarks since the team’s formation. These milestones reflect both the club’s attacking development and the individual contributions of players who have played a role in shaping its goal-scoring history.

- Active players in **bold**, statistics correct as of 20 May 2026.

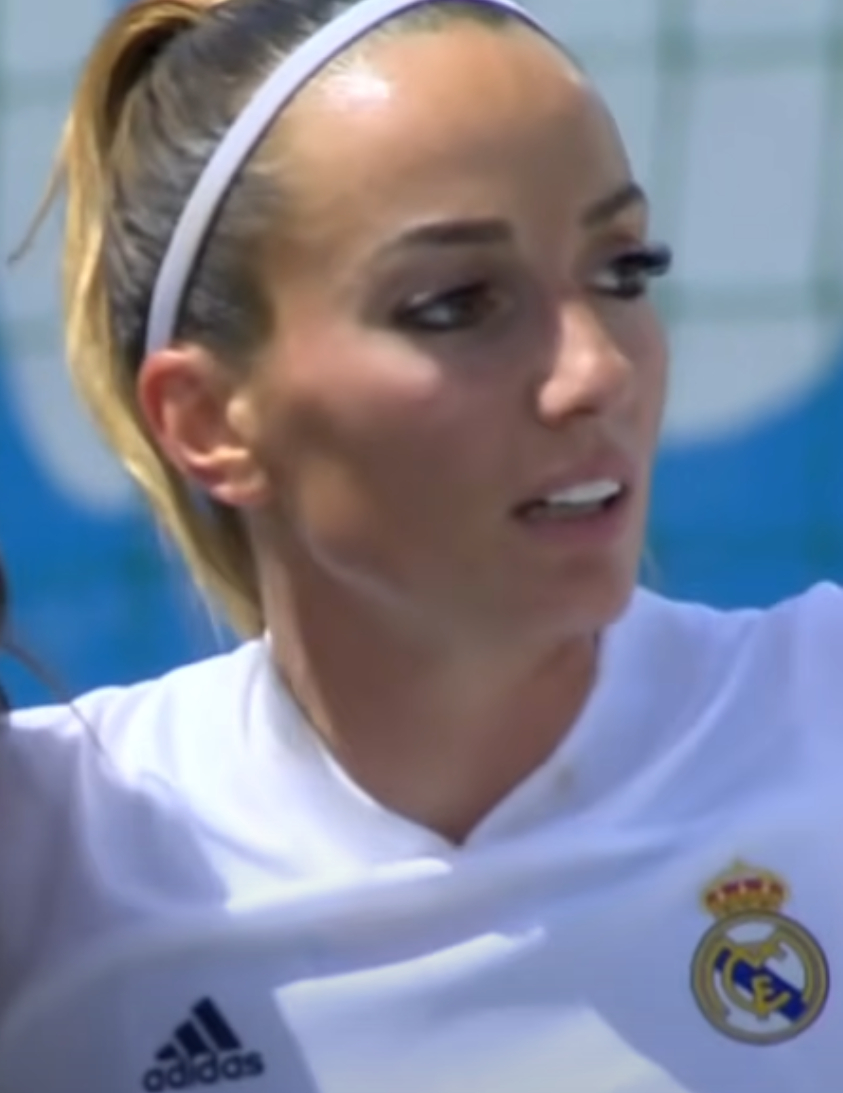
Kosovare Asllani is Real Madrid's first goal scorer

- (Sweden) Kosovare Asllani (1st goal)
- (Spain) Marta Cardona (10th goal)
- (Brazil) Thaisa Moreno (20th goal)
- (Spain) Lorena Navarro (30th goal)
- (Spain) Marta Cardona (40th goal)
- (Sweden) Sofia Jakobsson (50th goal)
- (France) Aurélie Kaci (60th goal)
- (Paraguay) Jessica Martínez (70th goal)
- (Spain) Lorena Navarro (80th goal)
- (Spain) Esther González (90th goal)
- (Spain) Claudia Zornoza (100th goal)
- (Spain) **Athenea del Castillo** (110th goal)
- (Germany) Babett Peter (120th goal)
- (Spain) Lorena Navarro (130th goal)
- (Sweden) Kosovare Asllani (140th goal)
- (Scotland) Caroline Weir (150th goal)
- (Scotland) Caroline Weir (160th goal)
- (Scotland) Caroline Weir (170th goal)
- (Spain) Teresa Abelleira (180th goal)
- (Spain) Teresa Abelleira (190th goal)
- (Spain) Rocío Gálvez (200th goal)
- (Spain) Esther González (210th goal)
- (Mexico) Kenti Robles (220th goal)
- (Spain) Esther González (230th goal)
- (Scotland) Caroline Weir (240th goal)
- (Spain) Nahikari García (250th goal)
- (Spain) Maite Oroz (260th goal)
- (France) Naomie Feller (270th goal)
- (Denmark) **Signe Bruun** (280th goal)
- (Spain) **Athenea del Castillo** (290th goal)
- (Spain) **Athenea del Castillo** (300th goal)
- (Denmark) Caroline Møller (310th goal)
- (Spain) Olga Carmona (320th goal)
- (Spain) Teresa Abelleira (330th goal)
- (Denmark) **Signe Bruun** (340th goal)
- (Spain) **Athenea del Castillo** (350th goal)
- (France) **Sandie Toletti** (360th goal)
- (Scotland) Caroline Weir (370th goal)
- (France) Naomie Feller (380th goal)
- (Colombia) **Linda Caicedo** (390th goal)
- (Spain) **Alba Redondo** (400th goal)
- (France) **Maëlle Lakrar** (410th goal)
- (Spain) **María Méndez** (420th goal)
- (Spain) **Eva Navarro** (430th goal)
- (Spain) Carla Camacho (440th goal)
- (France) Naomie Feller (450th goal)
- (Spain) **Alba Redondo** (460th goal)
- (Spain) **María Méndez** (470th goal)
- (Scotland) Caroline Weir (480th goal)
- (France) **Maëlle Lakrar** (490th goal)
- (Denmark) **Sara Holmgaard** (500th goal)
- (Scotland) Caroline Weir (510th goal)
- (Germany) **Sara Däbritz** (520th goal)
- (Scotland) Caroline Weir (530th goal)
- (Spain) **Athenea del Castillo** (540th goal)
- (Denmark) **Sara Holmgaard** (550th goal)
- (Scotland) Caroline Weir (560th goal)

== Honours ==
=== Domestic competitions ===
- Liga F
  - Runners-up (5): 2020–21, 2022–23, 2023–24, 2024–25, 2025–26

=== Cups ===
- Copa de la Reina
  - Runners-up (1): 2022–23
- Supercopa de España
  - Runners-up (2): 2024–25, 2025–26

Since its official launch in 2020, Real Madrid Femenino have not yet won a major trophy, but the club has established itself as a consistent challenger in Spanish women's football, finishing runners-up in four Liga F seasons and once in the Copa de la Reina and securing regular qualification to the UEFA Women's Champions League.

In their debut campaign under the Real Madrid name, the 2020–21 season, the team finished second in the Primera División with 74 points from 23 wins, 5 draws and 6 defeats, immediately qualifying for their first UEFA Women’s Champions League and becoming Barcelona’s closest rival.

The 2022–23 season reinforced their progress as Real Madrid again finished second in the league, collecting 75 points (24 wins, 3 draws, 3 losses), scoring 80 goals and conceding 25. That same season, they reached the Copa de la Reina final for the first time in club history, taking a 2–0 lead over Atlético Madrid before conceding twice in stoppage time and eventually losing on penalties.

The 2023–24 campaign again saw Real Madrid finish second in Liga F, recording 73 points (24 wins, 1 draw, 5 losses), behind champions Barcelona. In 2024–25, the club again ended the season as runners-up, earning 76 points with 24 wins, 4 draws and only 2 defeats, scoring 87 goals and conceding 28.

== Personnel ==
=== Current technical staff ===
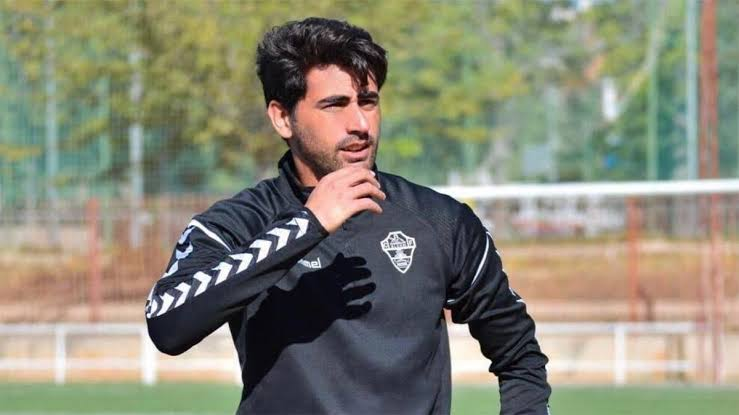
Pau Quesada is the current manager of the club

Position	Staff
Head coach	(Spain) Pau Quesada
Assistant coach	(Spain) Antonio Rodríguez & (Spain) Pablo de Lucas
Fitness coach	(Spain) Antonio Caballero & (Spain) Jairo Huerta

=== Management ===
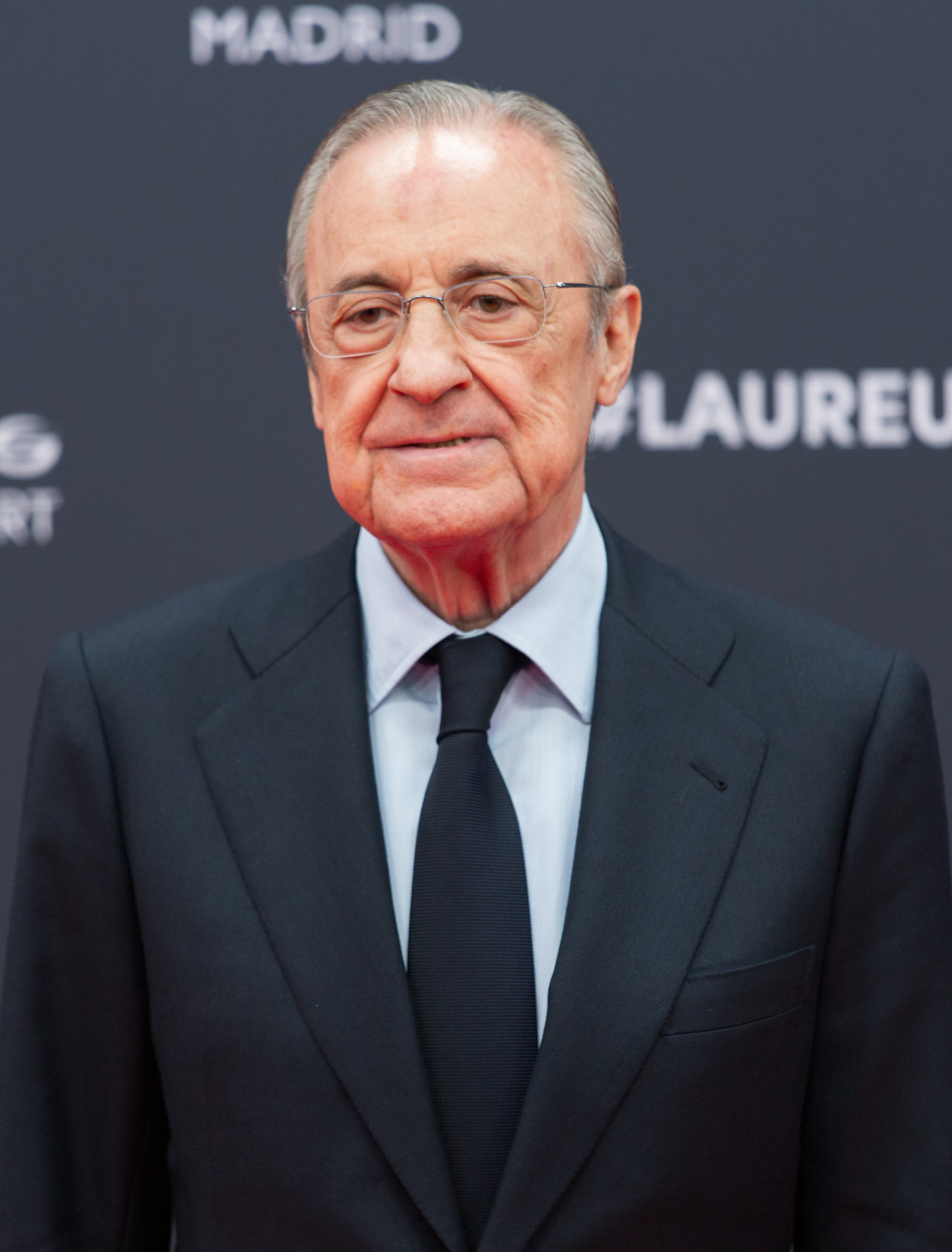
Spanish businessman Florentino Pérez is the current president of the club

Position	Staff
President	Florentino Pérez
Vice-presidents	Fernando Fernández Tapias
Vice-presidents	Eduardo Fernández de Blas
Vice-presidents	Pedro López Jiménez
Honorary President	José Martínez Sánchez-Pirri
Secretary of the Board	Enrique Sánchez González
Members	Ángel Luis Heras Aguado, Santiago Aguadi García, Jerónimo Farré, Muncharaz, Enrique Pérez Rodriguez, Manuel Cerezo, Velázquez, José Sánchez Bernal, Gumersindo Santamaría, Gil, Raúl Ronda Ortiz, José Manuel Otero, Lastre, Nicolás Martín-Sanz, García, Catalina Miñarro, Brugarolas, Manuel Torres Gómez

- Last updated: 4 June 2024

=== List of Real Madrid Femenino managers ===
Coach	Time period
CD TACÓN
(Spain) Marta Tejedor	2016–18
(Spain) David Aznar	2018–20
Real Madrid Femenino
(Spain) David Aznar	2020–21
(Spain) Alberto Toril	2021–25
(Spain) Pau Queseada	2025–present
