= 2020–21 Real Madrid Femenino season =

Real Madrid Femenino
2020–21 season
- President: Florentino Pérez
- Coach: David Aznar
- Stadium: Alfredo Di Stéfano Stadium
- Primera División: 2nd
- Copa de la Reina: Quarter-finals
- Top goalscorer: League: Kosovare Asllani (16); All: Kosovare Asllani (17)
- Biggest win: 8–1 vs Espanyol, Primera División, 13 December 2020
- Biggest defeat: 0–4 vs Barcelona, Primera División, 4 October 2020
Home colours	Away colours	Third colours

The 2020–21 season was the 5th season in the existence of Real Madrid Femenino and the club's first season after being officially rebranded as part of Real Madrid. In addition to the domestic league, they participated in the Copa de la Reina.

David Aznar returned for his third campaign as coach. While the club inherited the TACÓN squad, a number of new signings were made to bolster the squad's odds of challenging for silverware in their first season as part of Real Madrid. Misa Rodríguez was signed from Deportivo de La Coruña to be the team's starting goalkeeper while Ivana Andrés was another notable signing from Levante as the central defender quickly became club captain.

The club also made a signing which, despite the lack of disclosed information on transfers in women's football, would probably have been amongst the most lucrative of all time. Maite Oroz signed from Athletic Club, and the Basque club was reportedly requesting €250,000 in formation fees for Oroz. At the time, this fee would have broken the women's transfer record set by Rayo Vallecano in 2002 when the club purchased Milene Domingues from Fiammamonza for €235,000. However, as Oroz (and former teammate Damaris Egurrola) were out of contract, the legality of the formation fees imposed on their new clubs was challenged and a Spanish court eventually found that Athletic were not owed a fee.

== Competitions ==
=== Overall record ===
Competition	First match	Last match	Starting round	Final position	Record							
Competition	First match	Last match	Starting round	Final position	Pld	W	D	L	GF	GA	GD	Win %
Primera División	4 October 2020	27 June 2021	Matchday 1	2nd	34	23	5	6	75	33	+42	67.65
Copa de la Reina	21 April 2021		Quarter-finals	Quarter-finals	1	0	0	1	1	2	−1	0.00
Total					35	23	5	7	76	35	+41	65.71

Source: Soccerway

=== Primera División ===
==== League table ====
Pos	Team	Pld	W	D	L	GF	GA	GD	Pts	Qualification or relegation
1	Barcelona (C)	34	33	0	1	167	15	+152	99	Qualification for the Champions League group stage
2	Real Madrid	34	23	5	6	75	33	+42	74	Qualification for the Champions League second round
3	Levante	34	21	7	6	68	44	+24	70	Qualification for the Champions League first round
4	Atlético de Madrid	34	18	9	7	61	32	+29	63	
5	Real Sociedad	34	18	7	9	66	44	+22	61	

Source: RFEF
Rules for classification: 1) points; 2) head-to-head points; 3) goal difference; 4) number of goals scored
(C) Champions

=== Copa de la Reina ===
The draw for the quarter-finals took place on 5 April 2021.

21 April 2021 Quarter-finals	Madrid CFF	2-1 (a.e.t.)	Real Madrid Femenino	Madrid
13:00	Geyse 3'; Borja 110'	Report	Asllani 77' (pen.)	Stadium: Venue Centro Deportivo Municipal Antiguo Canódromo; Referee: Beatriz Cuesta
