= Alberto Toril =

Spanish footballer and manager

Personal information
- Full name: José Alberto Toril Rodríguez
- Date of birth: 7 July 1973 (age 53)
- Place of birth: Peñarroya, Spain
- Height: 1.79 m (5 ft 10 in)
- Position: Midfielder

Youth career
- 1988–1991: Real Madrid

Senior career*
Years	Team	Apps	(Gls)
1991–1994	Real Madrid B	45	(8)
1993–1994	Real Madrid	2	(0)
1994–1995	Celta	9	(0)
1995–1997	Espanyol	17	(0)
1997–2000	Extremadura	74	(5)
2000–2002	Albacete	44	(7)
2002–2003	Racing Ferrol	22	(2)
2003–2004	Numancia	8	(0)
Total		221	(22)

International career
1988–1989	Spain U16	3	(0)
1991	Spain U18	4	(0)
1992–1993	Spain U21	3	(0)

Managerial career
- 2002–2003: Racing Ferrol (youth)
- 2004–2005: Quintanar Rey (assistant)
- 2005–2008: Albacete (youth)
- 2009–2011: Real Madrid (youth)
- 2011–2013: Real Madrid B
- 2016–2017: Elche
- 2021–2025: Real Madrid Femenino
- 2026: Toluca (women)
- * Club domestic league appearances and goals

José Alberto Toril Rodríguez (born 7 July 1973) is a Spanish former professional footballer who played as a central midfielder, who most recently managed Liga F club Real Madrid Femenino.

He was mainly associated to Real Madrid during his career – although he appeared rarely for the first team, and only amassed La Liga totals of 44 matches and two goals for a total of four clubs, in five seasons – as both a player and a manager (coaching various of its teams).

== Playing career ==
Born in Peñarroya-Pueblonuevo, Córdoba, Andalusia, Toril joined Real Madrid's youth system at the age of 15, but appeared only twice for its first team, leaving the club in 1994 and resuming his career with RC Celta de Vigo and RCD Espanyol. With the latter, he experienced his best La Liga season in 1995–96, appearing in 17 matches (but out of a possible 42, and only playing the full 90 minutes once).

After playing no league matches for RCD Espanyol in the 1996–97 campaign, Toril signed for CF Extremadura, featuring in 40 Segunda División games en route to a top flight promotion. This was followed by immediate relegation.

Until his retirement in 2004 at the age of 31, Toril spent five seasons in the second level, with Extremadura, Albacete Balompié, Racing de Ferrol and CD Numancia, helping the latter side return to the top division after a three-year absence but only contributing with eight appearances to the feat (516 minutes).

== Coaching career ==
Toril begun coaching still as an active player, being in charge of youth teams at Ferrol and Albacete and being assistant at amateurs CD Quintanar del Rey. In 2008, he returned to his first club Real Madrid as a technical advisor in the youth system, coaching a combined juvenil side in in-season tournaments and later being named as a mid-season replacement for Antonio Díaz Carlavilla at Real Madrid C.

In early January 2011, after nearly two years with the youth teams of Real Madrid, Toril was appointed at Real Madrid Castilla, replacing fired Alejandro Menéndez. On 29 April 2011, after leading the Segunda División B team to eight consecutive wins (eventually winning 11 out of 12 from January/March 2011), he had his contract renewed for a further two seasons.

Toril was fired by Castilla on 19 November 2013, following a 0–6 loss at SD Eibar that left the team in 22nd and last position. On 28 June 2016, after nearly three years unemployed, he was named Elche CF manager.

== Honours ==
=== Manager ===
Real Madrid Castilla

- Segunda División B: 2011–12

== Managerial statistics ==
As of 28 April 2017

Team	Nationality	From	To	Record							
Team	Nationality	From	To	G	W	D	L	GF	GA	GD	Win %
Real Madrid Castilla	(Spain)	5 January 2011	19 November 2013	119	60	24	35	232	140	+92	50.42
Elche	(Spain)	28 June 2016	29 April 2017	38	11	10	17	49	57	−8	28.95
Total				157	71	34	52	281	197	+84	45.22
