= Claudia Zornoza =

Spanish footballer (born 1990)

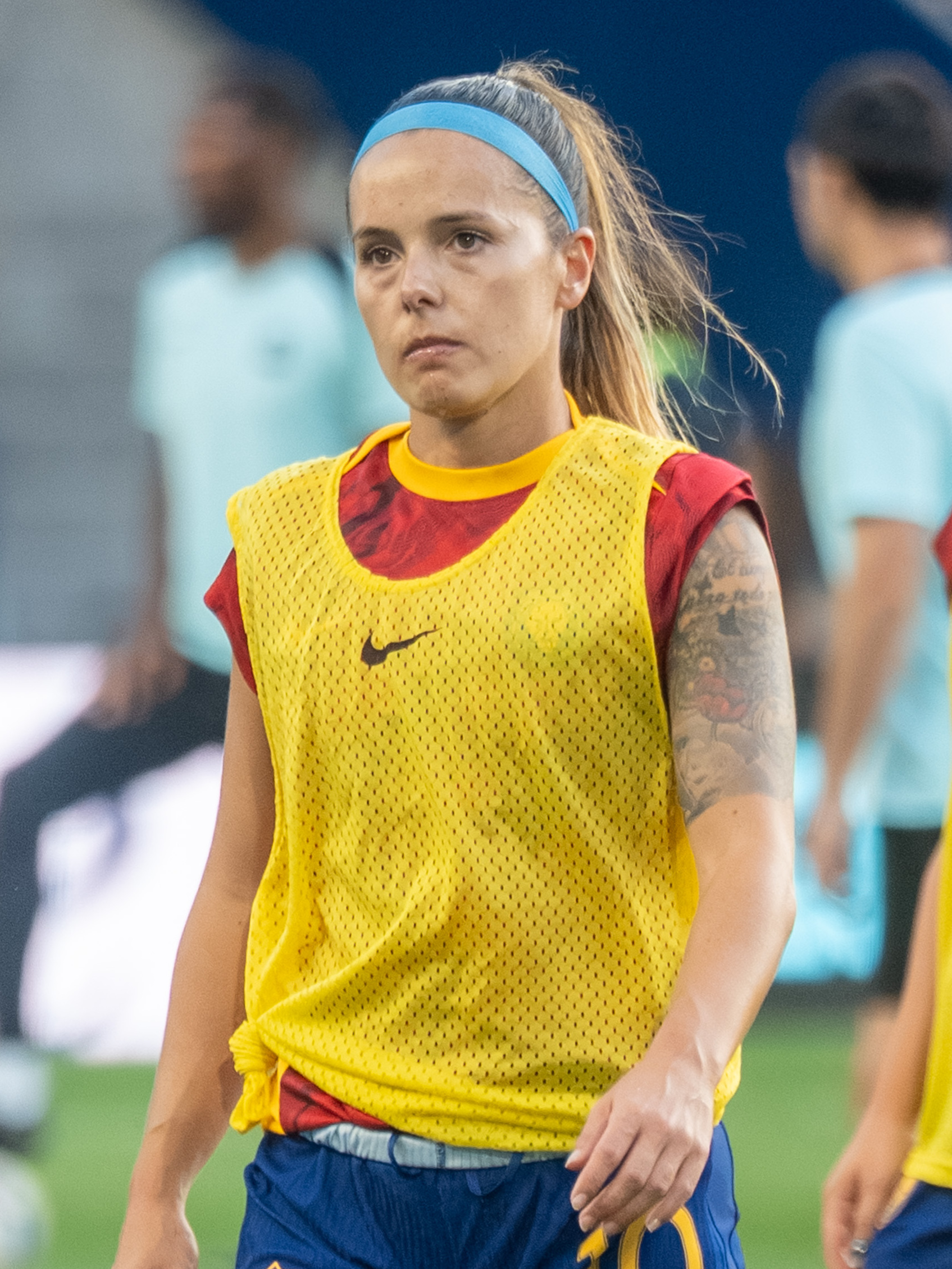
- Claudia Zornoza with Utah Royals in 2025

Personal information
- Full name: Claudia Zornoza Sánchez
- Date of birth: 20 October 1990 (age 36)
- Place of birth: Madrid, Spain
- Height: 1.64 m (5 ft 5 in)
- Position: Midfielder

Senior career*
Years	Team	Apps	(Gls)
2008–2010	Pozuelo		
2010–2011	Rayo Vallecano	15	(4)
2011–2014	Atlético de Madrid	76	(24)
2014–2017	Valencia	75	(11)
2017–2018	Real Sociedad	30	(7)
2018–2021	Levante	48	(5)
2021–2024	Real Madrid	80	(8)
2024–2025	Utah Royals	34	(3)
Total		358+	(62+)

International career^{‡}
- Spain U-19
2016–2023	Spain	13	(0)
Medal record
Women's football
Representing Spain
FIFA Women's World Cup
Winner	2023 Australia–New Zealand
- * Club domestic league appearances and goals as of 02:30, 4 November 2025 (UTC) ‡ National team caps and goals as of 15:55, 23 June 2024 (UTC)

Claudia Zornoza Sánchez (born 20 October 1990) is a Spanish former professional footballer who played as a midfielder. She made over 300 appearances in Liga F for Pozuelo, Rayo Vallecano, Atlético de Madrid, Valencia, Real Sociedad, Levante, and Real Madrid. She represented the Spain national team on 13 occasions and was part of their squad that won the 2023 FIFA Women's World Cup. She retired with the Utah Royals of the National Women's Soccer League (NWSL).

== Club career ==
Zornoza started playing football at the age of four. She made her debut in the Spanish first division in 2008 with CF Pozuelo. Two years later, she joined Rayo Vallecano, with whom she won the Spanish league in 2011. She then entered the Champions League the following season, but suffered a cruciate ligament rupture.

Zornoza then played for Atlético Madrid, then signed for Valencia CF, where she injured her cruciate ligament again in 2015. In 2017, she refused to sign for Levante UD, the Valencian rivals, and preferred to play for Real Sociedad. She eventually joined Levante UD the following season.

In 2021, she joined Real Madrid. For the club's first European campaign, she scored the qualifying goal for the group stage against Manchester City. Then, in the quarter-finals, she scored a goal at Camp Nou against FC Barcelona. She stood out as the centerpiece of the midfield of the casa blanca.

On 12 July 2024, American club Utah Royals announced that they had signed Zornoza through 2025 with an option for 2026. On 25 September 2025, Zonroza and Utah Royals announced that she would retire after the 2025 season. She played the final match of her 21-year long career in the Royals' last game of the season, which was a victory over the Washington Spirit on November 1, 2025.

== International career ==
Zornoza made her senior international debut in March 2016, starting a 0–0 friendly draw with Romania in Mogoșoaia. She was named to the squad for the 2023 World Cup.

== Honours ==
Rayo Vallecano

- Primera División: 2010-11

Spain

- FIFA Women's World Cup: 2023
