= 2016 UEFA Women's Under-17 Championship qualification =

European football competition

Tournament details
- Dates: Qualifying round: 28 September – 28 October 2015; Elite round: 3–29 March 2016
- Teams: 46 (from 1 confederation)

Tournament statistics
- Matches played: 102
- Goals scored: 449 (4.4 per match)
- Top scorer(s): (England) Alessia Russo (England) Georgia Stanway (Spain) Lorena Navarro (9 goals each)

The 2016 UEFA Women's Under-17 Championship qualification' was a women's under-17 football competition organised by UEFA to determine the seven national teams joining the automatically qualified hosts Belarus in the 2016 UEFA Women's Under-17 Championship final tournament.

A total of 46 national teams, with Andorra entering a UEFA women's competition for the first time, entered this qualifying competition, which was played in two rounds between September 2015 and March 2016. Players born on or after 1 January 1999 were eligible to participate. Each match had a duration of 80 minutes, consisting of two halves of 40 minutes with a 15-minute half-time.

== Format ==
The qualifying competition consisted of two rounds:

- Qualifying round: Apart from Germany and France, which received byes to the elite round as the two teams with the highest seeding coefficient, the remaining 44 teams were drawn into 11 groups of four teams. Each group was played in single round-robin format at one of the teams selected as hosts after the draw. The 11 group winners and the 11 runners-up advanced to the elite round.
- Elite round: The 24 teams were drawn into six groups of four teams. Each group was played in single round-robin format at one of the teams selected as hosts after the draw. The six group winners and the runner-up with the best record against the first and third-placed teams in their group qualified for the final tournament.

=== Tiebreakers ===
The teams were ranked according to points (3 points for a win, 1 point for a draw, 0 points for a loss). If two or more teams were equal on points on completion of a mini-tournament, the following tie-breaking criteria were applied, in the order given, to determine the rankings:

1. Higher number of points obtained in the mini-tournament matches played among the teams in question;
2. Superior goal difference resulting from the mini-tournament matches played among the teams in question;
3. Higher number of goals scored in the mini-tournament matches played among the teams in question;
4. If, after having applied criteria 1 to 3, teams still had an equal ranking, criteria 1 to 3 were reapplied exclusively to the mini-tournament matches between the teams in question to determine their final rankings. If this procedure did not lead to a decision, criteria 5 to 9 applied;
5. Superior goal difference in all mini-tournament matches;
6. Higher number of goals scored in all mini-tournament matches;
7. If only two teams had the same number of points, and they were tied according to criteria 1 to 6 after having met in the last round of the mini-tournament, their rankings were determined by a penalty shoot-out (not used if more than two teams had the same number of points, or if their rankings were not relevant for qualification for the next stage).
8. Lower disciplinary points total based only on yellow and red cards received in the mini-tournament matches (red card = 3 points, yellow card = 1 point, expulsion for two yellow cards in one match = 3 points);
9. Drawing of lots.

To determine the best runner-up from the elite round, the results against the teams in fourth place were discarded. The following criteria were applied:

1. Higher number of points;
2. Superior goal difference;
3. Higher number of goals scored;
4. Lower disciplinary points total based only on yellow and red cards received (red card = 3 points, yellow card = 1 point, expulsion for two yellow cards in one match = 3 points);
5. Drawing of lots.

== Qualifying round ==
=== Draw ===
The draw for the qualifying round was held on 19 November 2014, 08:40 CET (UTC+1), at the UEFA headquarters in Nyon, Switzerland.

The teams were seeded according to their coefficient ranking, calculated based on the following:

- 2012 UEFA Women's Under-17 Championship final tournament and qualifying competition (qualifying round and elite round)
- 2013 UEFA Women's Under-17 Championship final tournament and qualifying competition (qualifying round and elite round)
- 2014 UEFA Women's Under-17 Championship final tournament and qualifying competition (qualifying round and elite round)

Each group contained one team from Pot A, one team from Pot B, and two teams from Pot C. For political reasons, Armenia and Azerbaijan (due to the disputed status of Nagorno-Karabakh), as well as Russia and Ukraine (due to the Russian military intervention in Ukraine), could not be drawn in the same group.

Bye to elite round
Team	Coeff	Rank
Germany	13.666	1
France	12.500	2

Pot A
Team	Coeff	Rank
Spain	12.333	3
Sweden	8.833	4
Norway	8.667	5
Denmark	8.000	6
Switzerland	7.833	7
Austria	7.667	8
Belgium	7.333	9
Poland	7.333	10
Italy	7.167	11
Republic of Ireland	6.833	12
Iceland	6.833	13

Pot B
Team	Coeff	Rank
Czech Republic	6.667	14
Russia	6.667	15
Netherlands	6.333	16
England	6.167	17
Finland	5.667	18
Scotland	5.667	19
Hungary	5.500	20
Serbia	4.833	21
Turkey	4.000	22
Northern Ireland	3.667	23
Greece	3.667	24

Pot C
Team	Coeff	Rank
Romania	3.500	25
Bosnia and Herzegovina	3.333	26
Slovenia	3.000	27
Wales	3.000	28
Portugal	3.000	29
Bulgaria	2.333	30
Ukraine	2.333	31
Azerbaijan	2.000	32
Montenegro	2.000	33
Slovakia	1.667	34
Croatia	1.333	35
Moldova	1.333	36
Latvia	1.333	37
Israel	1.000	38
Faroe Islands	1.000	39
Estonia	0.000	40
Lithuania	0.000	41
Macedonia	0.000	42
Kazakhstan	0.000	43
Georgia	0.000	44
Andorra	—	45
Armenia	—	46

Notes

- Belarus (Coeff: 3.500) qualified automatically for the final tournament as hosts.
- Albania, Cyprus, Gibraltar, Liechtenstein, Luxembourg, Malta, and San Marino did not enter.

=== Groups ===
Times up to 24 October 2015 were CEST (UTC+2), thereafter times were CET (UTC+1).

==== Group 1 ====
Pos	Team	Pld	W	D	L	GF	GA	GD	Pts	Qualification
1	Republic of Ireland	3	3	0	0	13	0	+13	9	Elite round
2	Ukraine	3	2	0	1	12	3	+9	6	Elite round
3	Turkey (H)	3	1	0	2	5	4	+1	3	
4	Andorra	3	0	0	3	0	23	−23	0	

Source: UEFA
Rules for classification: Qualification tiebreakers
(H) Hosts
15 October 2015
10:00

Turkey	5–0	Andorra
Baysal 20'; Gören 35'; Sadıkoğlu 48', 68'; Azak 80+4'	Report

Altınordu Selçuk Efes Tesisleri 4, İzmir
Referee: Hannelore Onsea (Belgium)
15 October 2015
14:30

Republic of Ireland	3–0	Ukraine
Kelly 38'; Kavanagh 68'; Kiernan 75'	Report

Altınordu Selçuk Efes Tesisleri 4, İzmir
Referee: Valentina Garoffolo (Italy)

17 October 2015
10:00

Republic of Ireland	7–0	Andorra
Kelly 23'; Payne 28', 76'; Homan 52'; Noonan 59'; Ruddy 65'; Reybet-Degat 77'	Report

Altınordu Selçuk Efes Tesisleri 4, İzmir
Referee: Nadezhda Belcheva (Bulgaria)
17 October 2015
14:30

Ukraine	1–0	Turkey
Hryb 78'	Report

Altınordu Selçuk Efes Tesisleri 4, İzmir
Referee: Hannelore Onsea (Belgium)

20 October 2015
14:30

Turkey	0–3	Republic of Ireland
	Report	Kiernan 6'; Kavanagh 35'; Kelly 69'

Altınordu Selçuk Efes Tesisleri 4, İzmir
Referee: Valentina Garoffolo (Italy)
20 October 2015
14:30

Andorra	0–11	Ukraine
	Report	Kumeda 9', 68', 74'; Kunina 26', 39', 65'; Hryb 30', 43', 58'; Shurubura 61'; Postol 78'

Altınordu Selçuk Efes Tesisleri 5, İzmir
Referee: Nadezhda Belcheva (Bulgaria)

==== Group 2 ====
Pos	Team	Pld	W	D	L	GF	GA	GD	Pts	Qualification
1	Austria	3	3	0	0	6	0	+6	9	Elite round
2	Scotland	3	1	1	1	4	3	+1	4	Elite round
3	Latvia	3	0	2	1	1	2	−1	2	
4	Kazakhstan (H)	3	0	1	2	1	7	−6	1	

Source: UEFA
Rules for classification: Qualification tiebreakers
(H) Hosts
11 October 2015
08:00

Scotland	0–0	Latvia
	Report

BIIK Stadium, Shymkent
Attendance: 30
Referee: Yuliya Larionova (Azerbaijan)
11 October 2015
11:00

Austria	2–0	Kazakhstan
Scharnböck 13'; Kurz 20'	Report

BIIK Stadium, Shymkent
Attendance: 315
Referee: Dilek Koçbay (Turkey)

13 October 2015
08:00

Austria	1–0	Latvia
Pireci 43'	Report

BIIK Stadium, Shymkent
Attendance: 55
Referee: Aleksandra Česen (Slovenia)
13 October 2015
11:00

Kazakhstan	0–4	Scotland
	Report	McGregor 20'; Hay 38', 46'; McDonald 57'

BIIK Stadium, Shymkent
Attendance: 120
Referee: Yuliya Larionova (Azerbaijan)

16 October 2015
11:00

Scotland	0–3	Austria
	Report	Bachler 15', 65'; Wienroither 62'

BIIK Stadium, Shymkent
Attendance: 30
Referee: Dilek Koçbay (Turkey)
16 October 2015
11:00

Latvia	1–1	Kazakhstan
Voitāne 66'	Report	Nizamutdinova 33'

Namyz Stadium, Shymkent
Attendance: 45
Referee: Aleksandra Česen (Slovenia)

==== Group 3 ====
Pos	Team	Pld	W	D	L	GF	GA	GD	Pts	Qualification
1	Spain	3	3	0	0	19	1	+18	9	Elite round
2	Greece	3	2	0	1	9	6	+3	6	Elite round
3	Portugal (H)	3	1	0	2	2	5	−3	3	
4	Armenia	3	0	0	3	0	18	−18	0	

Source: UEFA
Rules for classification: Qualification tiebreakers
(H) Hosts
23 October 2015
16:00

Spain	9–0	Armenia
Navarro 7', 33', 75'; Velázquez 29'; Pujadas 44'; Monente 58'; Gutiérrez 78'; M. Simonyan 80+2' (o.g.); Aleixandri 80+4'	Report

Estádio Municipal de Abrantes, Abrantes
Referee: Ifeoma Kulmala (Finland)
23 October 2015
17:00

Greece	1–0	Portugal
Gatsiou 45'	Report

Estádio Municipal Dr. Alves Vieira, Torres Novas
Referee: Cathrine Eide (Norway)

25 October 2015
16:00

Armenia	0–8	Greece
	Report	Antonyan 3' (o.g.); Chatzinikolaou 40', 43' (pen.), 50', 56'; Karapetsa 54'; Gatsiou 77', 80+1'

Estádio Municipal de Abrantes, Abrantes
Referee: Cathrine Eide (Norway)
25 October 2015
17:00

Spain	4–1	Portugal
Fernández 5'; Navarro 48'; Serrano 51'; Aleixandri 75'	Report	Faria 31'

Complexo Desportivo do Bonito, Entroncamento
Referee: Vera Opeykina (Russia)

28 October 2015
17:00

Greece	0–6	Spain
	Report	Navarro 34', 53'; Monente 40'; Blanco 43', 50'; Na. Ramos 59'

Complexo Desportivo do Bonito, Entroncamento
Referee: Ifeoma Kulmala (Finland)
28 October 2015
17:00

Portugal	1–0	Armenia
Ferreira 40+2'	Report

Estádio Municipal de Fátima, Fátima
Referee: Vera Opeykina (Russia)

==== Group 4 ====
Pos	Team	Pld	W	D	L	GF	GA	GD	Pts	Qualification
1	England	3	2	1	0	28	2	+26	7	Elite round
2	Poland	3	2	1	0	17	2	+15	7	Elite round
3	Croatia	3	0	1	2	0	18	−18	1	
4	Estonia (H)	3	0	1	2	0	23	−23	1	

Source: UEFA
Rules for classification: Qualification tiebreakers
(H) Hosts
1 October 2015
15:00

Poland	10–0	Estonia
Eckerle 6', 8', 50'; Ratajczyk 24'; Słowińska 27', 80+3'; Zawistowska 36', 40', 42', 45'	Report

Kadriorg Stadium, Tallinn
Referee: Ruzanna Petrosyan (Armenia)
1 October 2015
15:00

England	13–0	Croatia
Stanway 14', 17', 22', 34', 40+2' (pen.); Russo 26', 52', 59', 60', 75'; Cain 55'; Toone 68', 80+3'	Report

Rakvere linnastaadion, Rakvere
Referee: Sandra Strub (Switzerland)

3 October 2015
15:00

Poland	5–0	Croatia
Eckerle 4', 20'; Zawistowska 24'; Grec 34', 65'	Report

Rakvere linnastaadion, Rakvere
Referee: Olga Tereshko (Belarus)
3 October 2015
15:00

Estonia	0–13	England
	Report	Russo 4', 15', 46'; Charles 9', 28'; Patten 21'; Stanway 31', 33' (pen.); Sibley 42'; Hinds 53'; Alexander 59'; Olding 61'; Wubben-Moy 80+2'

A. Le Coq Arena, Tallinn
Referee: Sandra Strub (Switzerland)

6 October 2015
15:00

England	2–2	Poland
Charles 26'; Stanway 45' (pen.)	Report	Zawadzka 69' (pen.), 80+3' (pen.)

Rakvere linnastaadion, Rakvere
Referee: Ruzanna Petrosyan (Armenia)
6 October 2015
15:00

Croatia	0–0	Estonia
	Report

Kadriorg Stadium, Tallinn
Referee: Olga Tereshko (Belarus)

==== Group 5 ====
Pos	Team	Pld	W	D	L	GF	GA	GD	Pts	Qualification
1	Italy	3	3	0	0	14	0	+14	9	Elite round
2	Northern Ireland	3	1	1	1	3	5	−2	4	Elite round
3	Bosnia and Herzegovina	3	0	2	1	1	6	−5	2	
4	Macedonia (H)	3	0	1	2	1	8	−7	1	

Source: UEFA
Rules for classification: Qualification tiebreakers
(H) Hosts
28 September 2015
11:00

Italy	5–0	Bosnia and Herzegovina
Glionna 22', 49'; Caruso 35', 55'; Cantore 38'	Report

Training Centre Petar Miloševski, Skopje
Referee: Beatriz Gil Gozalo (Spain)
28 September 2015
11:00

Northern Ireland	3–0	Macedonia
McMaster 33'; Orr 58'; Beggs 80+2'	Report

Boris Trajkovski Stadium, Skopje
Referee: Jurgita Mačikunytė (Lithuania)

30 September 2015
11:00

Italy	4–0	Macedonia
Cantore 6'; Labate 18'; Greggi 71' (pen.); Glionna 75'	Report

Boris Trajkovski Stadium, Skopje
Referee: Biljana Lukić (Serbia)
30 September 2015
11:00

Bosnia and Herzegovina	0–0	Northern Ireland
	Report

Training Centre Petar Miloševski, Skopje
Referee: Jurgita Mačikunytė (Lithuania)

3 October 2015
11:00

Northern Ireland	0–5	Italy
	Report	Cantore 25', 76'; Caruso 47'; Glionna 51'; Merlo 68'

Training Centre Petar Miloševski, Skopje
Referee: Beatriz Gil Gozalo (Spain)
3 October 2015
11:00

Macedonia	1–1	Bosnia and Herzegovina
Tejić 50' (o.g.)	Report	Mehmedović 40+1'

Boris Trajkovski Stadium, Skopje
Referee: Biljana Lukić (Serbia)

==== Group 6 ====
Pos	Team	Pld	W	D	L	GF	GA	GD	Pts	Qualification
1	Belgium (H)	3	3	0	0	20	2	+18	9	Elite round
2	Czech Republic	3	2	0	1	19	5	+14	6	Elite round
3	Azerbaijan	3	1	0	2	6	5	+1	3	
4	Georgia	3	0	0	3	0	33	−33	0	

Source: UEFA
Rules for classification: Qualification tiebreakers
(H) Hosts
29 September 2015
14:00

Czech Republic	4–1	Azerbaijan
K. Dubcová 11', 57'; Khýrová 15'; Příkaská 72'	Report	M. Ozdemir 32'

Académie Robert Louis-Dreyfus, Liège
Referee: Ewa Augustyn (Poland)
29 September 2015
19:00

Belgium	15–0	Georgia
Vanmechelen 3', 21', 26' (pen.), 44'; Kerckhofs 5'; Minnaert 15', 22'; Asselberghs 23'; Duijsters 29', 36'; Wijnants 34'; Vierendeels 40+1'; Maris 42'; Abdulai Toloba 65' (pen.); Baccarne 80+3' (pen.)	Report

Académie Robert Louis-Dreyfus, Liège
Referee: Silvia Domingos (Portugal)

1 October 2015
15:00

Georgia	0–13	Czech Republic
	Report	Pavlasová 6'; Š. Krištofová 8', 44', 80+3'; M. Dubcová 10', 51' (pen.), 78'; Kodadová 17' (pen.); Dudová 21'; Čiperová 27', 62' (pen.); Siváková 35' (pen.); Klímová 61'

Kehrwegstadion, Eupen
Referee: Ewa Augustyn (Poland)
1 October 2015
20:00

Belgium	1–0	Azerbaijan
Minnaert 78'	Report

Kehrwegstadion, Eupen
Referee: Charlotte Carpenter (Wales)

4 October 2015
11:00

Czech Republic	2–4	Belgium
Radová 56'; Stašková 60'	Report	Vanmechelen 35', 74'; Minnaert 77', 80+1'

Académie Robert Louis-Dreyfus, Liège
Referee: Silvia Domingos (Portugal)
4 October 2015
11:00

Azerbaijan	5–0	Georgia
M. Ozdemir 4', 30', 80+1'; Uygun 8'; Mammadaliyeva 49'	Report

Kehrwegstadion, Eupen
Referee: Charlotte Carpenter (Wales)

==== Group 7 ====
Pos	Team	Pld	W	D	L	GF	GA	GD	Pts	Qualification
1	Denmark	3	3	0	0	9	0	+9	9	Elite round
2	Hungary (H)	3	2	0	1	5	2	+3	6	Elite round
3	Wales	3	1	0	2	5	5	0	3	
4	Israel	3	0	0	3	0	12	−12	0	

Source: UEFA
Rules for classification: Qualification tiebreakers
(H) Hosts
10 October 2015
15:00

Denmark	5–0	Israel
Holt Andersen 13'; Gejl 27', 44' (pen.); Svava 55'; Ibsen 79'	Report

Király Sportlétesítmény, Szombathely
Referee: Angelika Soeder (Germany)
10 October 2015
15:00

Hungary	2–1	Wales
Oláh 21', 51'	Report	Chivers 56'

Sportcentrum Bük, Bük
Referee: Irena Velevačkoska (Macedonia)

12 October 2015
15:00

Denmark	3–0	Wales
Andersen 43', 80+2'; Petersen 64'	Report

Király Sportlétesítmény, Szombathely
Referee: Bojana Tošic (Bosnia and Herzegovina)
12 October 2015
15:00

Israel	0–3	Hungary
	Report	Csigi 10'; Vári 49'; Pulins 80+3'

Sportcentrum Bük, Bük
Referee: Irena Velevačkoska (Macedonia)

15 October 2015
11:00

Hungary	0–1	Denmark
	Report	Gejl 15'

Sportcentrum Bük, Bük
Referee: Angelika Soeder (Germany)
15 October 2015
15:00

Wales	4–0	Israel
Lancaster 22'; Woodham 27'; Morgan 35'; Chivers 39'	Report

Sportcentrum Bük, Bük
Referee: Bojana Tošic (Bosnia and Herzegovina)

==== Group 8 ====
Pos	Team	Pld	W	D	L	GF	GA	GD	Pts	Qualification
1	Sweden	3	3	0	0	18	1	+17	9	Elite round
2	Russia	3	2	0	1	7	2	+5	6	Elite round
3	Slovakia	3	1	0	2	6	6	0	3	
4	Romania (H)	3	0	0	3	0	22	−22	0	

Source: UEFA
Rules for classification: Qualification tiebreakers
(H) Hosts
12 October 2015
10:00

Sweden	3–1	Slovakia
Nilsson 32'; Ovenberger 51'; Lilja 77'	Report	Jančová 78'

Stadionul Buftea, Buftea
Referee: Julia-Stefanie Baier (Austria)
12 October 2015
14:00

Russia	4–0	Romania
Guseva 49', 62', 69'; Maksimova 75'	Report

Stadionul Mogoșoaia Pitch 2, Mogoșoaia
Referee: Sarah Garratt (England)

14 October 2015
10:00

Slovakia	0–3	Russia
	Report	A. Dronova 11' (pen.); Guseva 29'; Zarubina 50'

Stadionul Buftea, Buftea
Referee: Sarah Garratt (England)
14 October 2015
14:00

Sweden	13–0	Romania
Hed 8', 27'; Ovenberger 20', 42'; Lilja 21'; Mateș 31' (o.g.); Kullashi 46', 55', 69', 78'; Öman 62'; Abrahamsson 67'; Sandström 80+1'	Report

Stadionul Mogoșoaia Pitch 2, Mogoșoaia
Referee: Justina Lavrenovaite (Lithuania)

17 October 2015
10:00

Russia	0–2	Sweden
	Report	Kullashi 20', 75'

Stadionul Buftea, Buftea
Referee: Julia-Stefanie Baier (Austria)
17 October 2015
10:00

Romania	0–5	Slovakia
	Report	Bogorová 13', 42'; Mikolajová 46', 49'; Vagaská 65'

Stadionul Mogoșoaia Pitch 2, Mogoșoaia
Referee: Justina Lavrenovaite (Lithuania)

==== Group 9 ====
Pos	Team	Pld	W	D	L	GF	GA	GD	Pts	Qualification
1	Switzerland	3	2	0	1	9	2	+7	6 (Note: Ranked by head-to-head record (Switzerland: 3 pts, +2 GD; Serbia: 3 pts, 0 GD; Slovenia: 3 pts, −2 GD).)	Elite round
2	Serbia (H)	3	2	0	1	8	4	+4	6	Elite round
3	Slovenia	3	2	0	1	3	4	−1	6	
4	Lithuania	3	0	0	3	3	13	−10	0	

Source: UEFA
Rules for classification: Qualification tiebreakers
(H) Hosts
Notes:
16 October 2015
14:00

Switzerland	6–1	Lithuania
Arfaoui 27', 30'; Reuteler 38', 59'; Lehmann 60'; Haller 74'	Report	Vaitukaitytė 39'

Stadion Srem Jakovo, Jakovo
Referee: Dimitrina Milkova (Bulgaria)
16 October 2015
14:00

Serbia	3–0	Slovenia
Poljak 49' (pen.), 53', 57'	Report

Sports Center of FA of Serbia, Stara Pazova
Referee: Ana Aguiar (Portugal)

18 October 2015
14:00

Switzerland	0–1	Slovenia
	Report	Pintarič 66'

Sports Center of FA of Serbia, Stara Pazova
Referee: Sabayel Gurbanova (Azerbaijan)
18 October 2015
14:05

Lithuania	1–5	Serbia
Gedgaudaitė 11'	Report	Trbojević 10'; Baka 16', 35'; Poljak 40+1'; Knežević 75'

Sports Center of FA of Serbia, Stara Pazova
Referee: Ana Aguiar (Portugal)

21 October 2015
14:00

Serbia	0–3	Switzerland
	Report	Schegg 20'; Haller 69'; Lehmann 80+3'

Sports Center of FA of Serbia, Stara Pazova
Referee: Dimitrina Milkova (Bulgaria)
21 October 2015
14:00

Slovenia	2–1	Lithuania
Šiftar 25'; Makovec 70'	Report	Vaitukaitytė 21'

Sports Center of FA of Serbia, Stara Pazova
Referee: Sabayel Gurbanova (Azerbaijan)

==== Group 10 ====
Pos	Team	Pld	W	D	L	GF	GA	GD	Pts	Qualification
1	Norway	3	2	1	0	23	1	+22	7	Elite round
2	Netherlands	3	2	1	0	15	1	+14	7	Elite round
3	Bulgaria (H)	3	1	0	2	4	14	−10	3	
4	Moldova	3	0	0	3	0	26	−26	0	

Source: UEFA
Rules for classification: Qualification tiebreakers
(H) Hosts
23 October 2015
14:00

Norway	14–0	Moldova
Norheim 9' (pen.), 25', 30', 40+1'; Huseby 13'; Nautnes 15', 37'; Linberg 39', 47', 60', 68'; Stenevik 51'; Ruud 79'; Haug 80+2'	Report

Kavarna Stadium, Kavarna
Referee: Frida Nielsen (Denmark)
23 October 2015
14:00

Netherlands	6–0	Bulgaria
Jansen 2', 71'; Olislagers 14'; Weerden 40'; Van de Ven 62'; Asbroek 80+3'	Report

Albena Stadium, Albena
Referee: Rebecca Welch (England)

25 October 2015
14:00

Norway	8–0	Bulgaria
Norheim 19', 26', 67'; Ruud 24'; Closs 31'; Linberg 37'; Giske 46'; Maanum 54'	Report

Albena Stadium, Albena
Referee: Reelika Turi (Estonia)
25 October 2015
14:00

Moldova	0–8	Netherlands
	Report	Van Deursen 2', 6', 72'; Asbroek 13', 76', 79'; Lohin 17' (o.g.); Sabajo 22'

Kavarna Stadium, Kavarna
Referee: Frida Nielsen (Denmark)

28 October 2015
14:00

Netherlands	1–1	Norway
Nouwen 76'	Report	Haug 14'

Kavarna Stadium, Kavarna
Referee: Frida Nielsen (Denmark)
28 October 2015
14:00

Bulgaria	4–0	Moldova
Aleksandrova 40', 57', 60'; Petkova 48'	Report

Albena Stadium, Albena
Referee: Reelika Turi (Estonia)

==== Group 11 ====
Pos	Team	Pld	W	D	L	GF	GA	GD	Pts	Qualification
1	Finland	3	3	0	0	18	0	+18	9	Elite round
2	Iceland	3	2	0	1	11	2	+9	6	Elite round
3	Montenegro (H)	3	1	0	2	3	9	−6	3	
4	Faroe Islands	3	0	0	3	1	22	−21	0	

Source: UEFA
Rules for classification: Qualification tiebreakers
(H) Hosts
22 October 2015
13:00

Iceland	3–0	Montenegro
Daníelsdóttir 67'; Eiríksdóttir 68'; Haralz 69'	Report

Podgorica City Stadium, Podgorica
Referee: Virginie Derouaux (Belgium)
22 October 2015
13:00

Finland	11–0	Faroe Islands
Sjöholm 2', 4', 33'; Rantala 15', 20', 44'; Tulkki 31' (pen.), 40+2'; Olmala 59'; Peuhkurinen 67'; Lappalainen 71'	Report

Stadion Braće Velašević, Danilovgrad
Referee: Chryso Georgiou (Cyprus)

24 October 2015
13:00

Iceland	8–0	Faroe Islands
Daníelsdóttir 5'; Jóhannsdóttir 16'; Haralz 30', 31', 47', 76'; Albertsdottir 37'; Rúnarsdóttir 69'	Report

Stadion Braće Velašević, Danilovgrad
Referee: Liliya Hasanova (Kazakhstan)
24 October 2015
13:00

Montenegro	0–5	Finland
	Report	Rantala 40+2', 74', 80+2'; Tulkki 63'; Sjöholm 80+4'

Podgorica City Stadium, Podgorica
Referee: Chryso Georgiou (Cyprus)

27 October 2015
13:00

Finland	2–0	Iceland
Rantala 22'; Tulkki 46'	Report

Stadion Braće Velašević, Danilovgrad
Referee: Virginie Derouaux (Belgium)
27 October 2015
13:00

Faroe Islands	1–3	Montenegro
Hansen 80+5'	Report	Šaranović 10', 55' (pen.); Vraneš 46'

Camp FSCG, Podgorica
Referee: Liliya Hasanova (Kazakhstan)

== Elite round ==
=== Draw ===
The draw for the elite round was held on 13 November 2015, 11:45 CET (UTC+1), at the UEFA headquarters in Nyon, Switzerland.

The teams were seeded according to their results in the qualifying round. Germany and France, which received byes to the elite round, were automatically seeded into Pot A. Each group contained one team from Pot A, one team from Pot B, one team from Pot C, and one team from Pot D. Teams from the same qualifying round group could not be drawn in the same group. For political reasons, Russia and Ukraine (due to the Russian military intervention in Ukraine) could not be drawn in the same group.

Pos	Grp	Team	Pld	W	D	L	GF	GA	GD	Pts	Seeding
1	—	Germany	0	0	0	0	0	0	0	0	Pot A
2	—	France	0	0	0	0	0	0	0	0	Pot A
3	6	Belgium	3	3	0	0	20	2	+18	9	Pot A
4	3	Spain	3	3	0	0	19	1	+18	9	Pot A
5	11	Finland	3	3	0	0	18	0	+18	9	Pot A
6	8	Sweden	3	3	0	0	18	1	+17	9	Pot A
7	5	Italy	3	3	0	0	14	0	+14	9	Pot B
8	1	Republic of Ireland	3	3	0	0	13	0	+13	9	Pot B
9	7	Denmark	3	3	0	0	9	0	+9	9	Pot B
10	2	Austria	3	3	0	0	6	0	+6	9	Pot B
11	4	England	3	2	1	0	28	2	+26	7	Pot B
12	10	Norway	3	2	1	0	23	1	+22	7	Pot B
13	4	Poland	3	2	1	0	17	2	+15	7	Pot C
14	10	Netherlands	3	2	1	0	15	1	+14	7	Pot C
15	6	Czech Republic	3	2	0	1	19	5	+14	6	Pot C
16	1	Ukraine	3	2	0	1	12	3	+9	6	Pot C
17	11	Iceland	3	2	0	1	11	2	+9	6	Pot C
18	9	Switzerland	3	2	0	1	9	2	+7	6	Pot C
19	8	Russia	3	2	0	1	7	2	+5	6	Pot D
20	9	Serbia	3	2	0	1	8	4	+4	6	Pot D
21	3	Greece	3	2	0	1	9	6	+3	6	Pot D
22	7	Hungary	3	2	0	1	5	2	+3	6	Pot D
23	2	Scotland	3	1	1	1	4	3	+1	4	Pot D
24	5	Northern Ireland	3	1	1	1	3	5	−2	4	Pot D

Source: UEFA
Rules for classification: 1) points; 2) goal difference; 3) goals scored; 4) disciplinary points; 5) coefficient; 6) drawing of lots.

=== Groups ===
Times up to 26 March 2016 were CET (UTC+1), thereafter times were CEST (UTC+2).

==== Group 1 ====
Pos	Team	Pld	W	D	L	GF	GA	GD	Pts	Qualification
1	Germany	3	3	0	0	9	1	+8	9	Final tournament
2	Austria (H)	3	1	1	1	8	7	+1	4	
3	Switzerland	3	1	1	1	7	6	+1	4	
4	Russia	3	0	0	3	1	11	−10	0	

Source: UEFA
Rules for classification: Qualification tiebreakers
(H) Hosts
19 March 2016
11:00

Germany	2–0	Switzerland
Minge 25'; Müller 65'	Report

Lindabrunn Stadium, Enzesfeld-Lindabrunn
Referee: Cristina Bujor (Romania)
19 March 2016
15:00

Austria	4–0	Russia
Krumböck 23'; Pireci 39'; Scharnböck 59'; Bachler 80+1'	Report

Moser Medical Arena, Rohrendorf bei Krems
Referee: Jurgita Mačikunytė (Lithuania)

21 March 2016
11:00

Germany	3–0	Russia
Pawollek 18'; Gwinn 57'; Minge 65' (pen.)	Report

Lindabrunn Stadium, Enzesfeld-Lindabrunn
Referee: Marta Huerta De Aza (Spain)
21 March 2016
15:00

Switzerland	3–3	Austria
Reuteler 28'; Marti 31'; Schegg 80+4'	Report	Pireci 13'; Krumböck 24'; Klein 43'

Moser Medical Arena, Rohrendorf bei Krems
Referee: Jurgita Mačikunytė (Lithuania)

24 March 2016
15:00

Austria	1–4	Germany
Klein 80+1'	Report	Stolze 55', 67', 69'; Linder 56'

Moser Medical Arena, Rohrendorf bei Krems
Referee: Cristina Bujor (Romania)
24 March 2016
15:00

Russia	1–4	Switzerland
Ruzina 7'	Report	Schegg 9' (pen.), 23'; Reuteler 16'; Schuling 36'

Lindabrunn Stadium, Enzesfeld-Lindabrunn
Referee: Marta Huerta De Aza (Spain)

==== Group 2 ====
Pos	Team	Pld	W	D	L	GF	GA	GD	Pts	Qualification
1	Spain	3	3	0	0	11	0	+11	9	Final tournament
2	Denmark	3	2	0	1	11	2	+9	6	
3	Northern Ireland (H)	3	0	1	2	0	9	−9	1	
4	Ukraine	3	0	1	2	0	11	−11	1	

Source: UEFA
Rules for classification: Qualification tiebreakers
(H) Hosts
22 March 2016
14:00

Denmark	4–0	Northern Ireland
Nielsen 3'; K. Holmgaard 60', 79'; Karlsen 64'	Report

Solitude, Belfast
Referee: Sabayel Gurbanova (Azerbaijan)
22 March 2016
17:00

Spain	4–0	Ukraine
Navarro 32'; Fernández 45'; Monente 51'; Batlle 70'	Report

Seaview, Belfast
Referee: Ivana Vlaić (Bosnia and Herzegovina)

24 March 2016
14:00

Ukraine	0–7	Denmark
	Report	Nielsen 5', 43'; S. Holmgaard 29', 77'; Kjærsig Sunesen 48'; Larsen 54' (pen.); Schreiber 80'

Seaview, Belfast
Referee: Sabayel Gurbanova (Azerbaijan)
24 March 2016
17:00

Spain	5–0	Northern Ireland
Eizaguirre 11', 14'; Gutiérrez 26'; Navarro 41', 72'	Report

Solitude, Belfast
Referee: Andromachi Tsiofliki (Greece)

27 March 2016
15:00

Denmark	0–2	Spain
	Report	Andújar 15'; Blanco 35'

Mill Meadow, Castledawson
Referee: Ivana Vlaić (Bosnia and Herzegovina)
27 March 2016
15:00

Northern Ireland	0–0	Ukraine
	Report

Seaview, Belfast
Referee: Andromachi Tsiofliki (Greece)

==== Group 3 ====
Pos	Team	Pld	W	D	L	GF	GA	GD	Pts	Qualification
1	Czech Republic	3	2	1	0	4	1	+3	7	Final tournament
2	Republic of Ireland	3	2	0	1	3	2	+1	6	
3	France (H)	3	1	1	1	3	2	+1	4	
4	Hungary	3	0	0	3	1	6	−5	0	

Source: UEFA
Rules for classification: Qualification tiebreakers
(H) Hosts
19 March 2016
17:30

France	1–1	Czech Republic
Rebours 22'	Report	Vojtková 49'

Stade du Hazé, Flers
Referee: Tess Petersson (Sweden)
19 March 2016
18:00

Republic of Ireland	2–1	Hungary
Noonan 56'; Kelly 80'	Report	Vachter 26'

Stade Henry Jeanne, Bayeux
Referee: Hannelore Onsea (Belgium)

21 March 2016
18:30

France	2–0	Hungary
Boussaha 20' (pen.); Cochelin 80+3'	Report

Stade Louis Villemer, Saint-Lô
Referee: Iuliana Demetrescu (Romania)
21 March 2016
19:00

Czech Republic	1–0	Republic of Ireland
Šlajsová 80'	Report

Stade du Hazé, Flers
Referee: Hannelore Onsea (Belgium)

24 March 2016
18:30

Republic of Ireland	1–0	France
Kiernan 21'	Report

Stade Henry Jeanne, Bayeux
Referee: Tess Petersson (Sweden)
24 March 2016
18:30

Hungary	0–2	Czech Republic
	Report	Klímová 34'; Stašková 54'

Stade Louis Villemer, Saint-Lô
Referee: Iuliana Demetrescu (Romania)

==== Group 4 ====
Pos	Team	Pld	W	D	L	GF	GA	GD	Pts	Qualification
1	Italy (H)	3	2	1	0	8	3	+5	7	Final tournament
2	Netherlands	3	2	0	1	4	2	+2	6	
3	Finland	3	1	1	1	3	4	−1	4	
4	Greece	3	0	0	3	1	7	−6	0	

Source: UEFA
Rules for classification: Qualification tiebreakers
(H) Hosts
15 March 2016
11:00

Finland	0–2	Netherlands
	Report	Van Dooren 2'; Doejaaren 19'

Stadio Germano Todoli, Cervia
Referee: Angelika Soeder (Germany)
15 March 2016
15:00

Italy	4–1	Greece
Glionna 8', 20'; Cantore 18'; Regazzoli 43'	Report	Chatzinikolaou 54'

Stadio Bruno Benelli, Ravenna
Referee: Liudmyla Telbukh (Ukraine)

17 March 2016
11:00

Finland	1–0	Greece
Tulkki 70' (pen.)	Report

Stadio Massimo Soprani di San Zaccaria, Ravenna
Referee: Cheryl Foster (Wales)
17 March 2016
15:00

Netherlands	0–2	Italy
	Report	Caruso 2'; Regazzoli 76'

Stadio Germano Todoli, Cervia
Referee: Liudmyla Telbukh (Ukraine)

20 March 2016
11:00

Italy	2–2	Finland
Caruso 36'; Cantore 62'	Report	Rantala 15'; Sjöholm 52'

Stadio Bruno Benelli, Ravenna
Referee: Angelika Soeder (Germany)
20 March 2016
11:00

Greece	0–2	Netherlands
	Report	Smits 61', 73'

Stadio Germano Todoli, Cervia
Referee: Cheryl Foster (Wales)

==== Group 5 ====
Pos	Team	Pld	W	D	L	GF	GA	GD	Pts	Qualification
1	Norway (H)	3	3	0	0	16	0	+16	9	Final tournament
2	Poland	3	1	1	1	5	6	−1	4	
3	Sweden	3	1	1	1	3	8	−5	4	
4	Scotland	3	0	0	3	0	10	−10	0	

Source: UEFA
Rules for classification: Qualification tiebreakers
(H) Hosts
3 March 2016
15:00

Sweden	2–2	Poland
Engström 5', 32'	Report	Eckerle 33'; Ratajczyk 38'

Ålgård stadion, Gjesdal
Referee: Silvia Domingos (Portugal)
3 March 2016
19:00

Norway	6–0	Scotland
Nautnes 26'; Huseby 40'; Birkeli 42'; Haug 58'; Olsen 66'; Stenevik 80+3'	Report

Ålgård stadion, Gjesdal
Referee: Aleksandra Česen (Slovenia)

5 March 2016
12:00

Sweden	1–0	Scotland
Ovenberger 35'	Report

Klepp Stadion, Kleppe
Referee: Alexandra Ponomareva (Russia)
5 March 2016
16:00

Poland	0–4	Norway
	Report	Olsen 5'; Stenevik 53'; Norheim 60'; Maanum 70'

Klepp Stadion, Kleppe
Referee: Aleksandra Česen (Slovenia)

8 March 2016
17:00

Norway	6–0	Sweden
Haug 23', 42', 58'; Maanum 55'; Stenevik 57'; Linberg 60'	Report

Klepp Stadion, Kleppe
Referee: Silvia Domingos (Portugal)
8 March 2016
17:00

Scotland	0–3	Poland
	Report	Eckerle 25', 39'; Jedlińska 35'

Ålgård stadion, Gjesdal
Referee: Alexandra Ponomareva (Russia)

==== Group 6 ====
Pos	Team	Pld	W	D	L	GF	GA	GD	Pts	Qualification
1	England	3	3	0	0	10	1	+9	9	Final tournament
2	Serbia (H)	3	2	0	1	8	4	+4	6	Final tournament
3	Iceland	3	1	0	2	3	11	−8	3	
4	Belgium	3	0	0	3	1	6	−5	0	

Source: UEFA
Rules for classification: Qualification tiebreakers
(H) Hosts

Matches on the first two matchdays, originally to be played on 24 and 26 March, were postponed to 25 and 27 March due to terrorist attacks in Belgium.

25 March 2016
14:00

Belgium	1–2	Iceland
Vanmechelen 58'	Report	Eiríksdóttir 2'; Haralz 72'

Suvača Sportcenter, Pećinci
Referee: Beatriz Gil Gozalo (Spain)
25 March 2016
14:00

England	3–1	Serbia
Patten 40'; Brazil 59'; Filbey 73'	Report	Filipović 38'

Sports Center of FA of Serbia, Stara Pazova
Referee: Elvira Nurmustafina (Kazakhstan)

27 March 2016
14:00

Belgium	0–2	Serbia
	Report	Poljak 4'; Filipović 40'

Karađorđe Stadium, Novi Sad
Referee: Yuliya Larionova (Azerbaijan)
27 March 2016
14:00

Iceland	0–5	England
	Report	Charles 13', 53'; Stanway 28'; Cain 31'; Russo 39'

Sports Center of FA of Serbia, Stara Pazova
Referee: Elvira Nurmustafina (Kazakhstan)

29 March 2016
14:00

England	2–0	Belgium
Brazil 40+1'; Charles 46'	Report

Suvača Sportcenter, Pećinci
Referee: Beatriz Gil Gozalo (Spain)
29 March 2016
14:00

Serbia	5–1	Iceland
Poljak 3', 39', 53'; Kardović 31'; Burkert 62'	Report	Albertsdottir 65'

Sports Center of FA of Serbia, Stara Pazova
Referee: Yuliya Larionova (Azerbaijan)

=== Ranking of second-placed teams ===
To determine the best second-placed team from the elite round qualifying for the final tournament, only the results of the second-placed teams against the first and third-placed teams in their group were taken into account.

Pos	Grp	Team	Pld	W	D	L	GF	GA	GD	Pts	Qualification
1	6	Serbia	2	1	0	1	6	4	+2	3	Final tournament
2	2	Denmark	2	1	0	1	4	2	+2	3	
3	4	Netherlands	2	1	0	1	2	2	0	3	
4	3	Republic of Ireland	2	1	0	1	1	1	0	3	
5	1	Austria	2	0	1	1	4	7	−3	1	
6	5	Poland	2	0	1	1	2	6	−4	1	

Source: UEFA
Rules for classification: 1) points; 2) goal difference; 3) goals scored; 4) disciplinary points; 5) drawing of lots.

== Qualified teams ==
The following eight teams qualified for the final tournament:

Team	Qualified as	Qualified on	Previous appearances in tournament^{1}
Belarus	Hosts	20 March 2012	0 (debut)
Germany	Elite round Group 1 winners	24 March 2016	7 (**2008**, **2009**, 2010, 2011, **2012**, **2014**, 2015)
Spain	Elite round Group 2 winners	27 March 2016	6 (2009, **2010**, **2011**, 2013, 2014, **2015**)
Czech Republic	Elite round Group 3 winners	24 March 2016	0 (debut)
Italy	Elite round Group 4 winners	20 March 2016	1 (2014)
Norway	Elite round Group 5 winners	8 March 2016	2 (2009, 2015)
England	Elite round Group 6 winners	27 March 2016	3 (2008, 2014, 2015)
Serbia	Elite round best runners-up	29 March 2016	0 (debut)

^{1} Bold indicates champion for that year. Italic indicates host for that year.

== Top goalscorers ==
The following players scored four goals or more in the qualifying competition:

9 goals

- (England) Alessia Russo
- (England) Georgia Stanway
- (Spain) Lorena Navarro

8 goals

- (Finland) Jutta Rantala
- (Norway) Andrea Norheim
- (Poland) Nicole Eckerle
- (Serbia) Allegra Poljak

7 goals

- (Belgium) Davinia Vanmechelen

6 goals

- (England) Niamh Charles
- (Iceland) Guðrún Gyða Haralz
- (Italy) Sofia Cantore
- (Italy) Benedetta Glionna
- (Norway) Sophie Haug
- (Norway) Camilla Linberg
- (Sweden) Loreta Kullashi

5 goals

- (Belgium) Marie Minnaert
- (Finland) Wilma Sjöholm
- (Finland) Emmaliina Tulkki
- (Greece) Despoina Chatzinikolaou
- (Italy) Arianna Caruso
- (Poland) Weronika Zawistowska

4 goals

- (Azerbaijan) Merve Ozdemir
- (Netherlands) Maud Asbroek
- (Norway) Elise Isolde Stenevik
- (Republic of Ireland) Lauren Kelly
- (Russia) Alena Guseva
- (Sweden) Matilda Ovenberger
- (Switzerland) Géraldine Reuteler
- (Switzerland) Leandra Schegg
- (Ukraine) Nataliia Hryb
