= Selcuk =

Selcuk is typically a diacritic-free form of Turkish Selçuk, the modern Turkish form of Seljuk or Seljuq.

As such, it may refer to:

- Selçuk (name)
- Selçuk, a town in Turkey
- Seljuk (died c. 1038), leader of the Seljuk Turks
  - Seljuq dynasty, the dynasty founded by Seljuk
  - Seljuq Empire, the medieval empire founded and ruled by the dynasty
  - Seljuq Sultanate of Rum, the medieval empire founded by later members of the dynasty
- Selcuk, a freighter, ex-Dalwarnic

== See also ==
- Selçuk (disambiguation)
- Seljuk (disambiguation)
