= 2016 UEFA Women's Under-17 Championship =

Чэмпіянат Еўропы па футболе сярод дзяўчат да 17 гадоў 2016 Чемпионат Европы по футболу 2016 среди девушек до 17 лет

Tournament details
- Host country: Belarus
- Dates: 4–16 May
- Teams: 8 (from 1 confederation)
- Venues: 5 (in 4 host cities)

Final positions
- Champions: Germany (5th title)
- Runners-up: Spain
- Third place: England
- Fourth place: Norway

Tournament statistics
- Matches played: 16
- Goals scored: 58 (3.63 per match)
- Attendance: 44,601 (2,788 per match)
- Top scorer(s): (England) Alessia Russo (Spain) Lorena Navarro (5 goals each)
- Best player: (Germany) Caroline Siems

The 2016 UEFA Women's Under-17 Championship was the ninth edition of the UEFA Women's Under-17 Championship, the annual European international youth football championship contested by the women's under-17 national teams of UEFA member associations. Belarus, which were selected by UEFA on 20 March 2012, hosted the tournament between 4 and 16 May 2016.

A total of eight teams played in the tournament, with players born on or after 1 January 1999 eligible to participate. Each match had a duration of 80 minutes, consisting of two halves of 40 minutes with a 15-minute half-time.

Same as previous editions held in even-numbered years, the tournament acted as the UEFA qualifiers for the FIFA U-17 Women's World Cup. The top three teams of the tournament qualified for the 2016 FIFA U-17 Women's World Cup in Jordan as the UEFA representatives.

== Qualification ==
The national teams from 47 UEFA member associations entered the competition, which was a record total, including Andorra who entered a UEFA women's competition for the first time. With Belarus automatically qualified as hosts, the other 46 teams contested a qualifying competition to determine the remaining seven spots in the final tournament. The qualifying competition consisted of two rounds: the qualifying round, which took place in autumn 2015, and the elite round, which took place in spring 2016.

=== Qualified teams ===
The following eight teams qualified for the final tournament:

Team	Method of qualification	Finals appearance	Last appearance	Previous best performance
Belarus	Hosts	1st	—	Debut
Germany	Elite round Group 1 winners	8th	2015	Champions (2008, 2009, 2012, 2014)
Spain	Elite round Group 2 winners	7th	2015	Champions (2010, 2011, 2015)
Czech Republic	Elite round Group 3 winners	1st	—	Debut
Italy	Elite round Group 4 winners	2nd	2014	Third place (2014)
Norway	Elite round Group 5 winners	3rd	2015	Fourth place (2009)
England	Elite round Group 6 winners	4th	2015	Fourth place (2008, 2014)
Serbia	Elite round Group 6 runners-up	1st	—	Debut

=== Notes ===
1. The best runners-up among all six elite round groups qualified for the final tournament.

=== Final draw ===
The final draw was held on 6 April 2016, 11:30 FET (UTC+3), at the Victoria Hotel in Minsk, Belarus. The eight teams were drawn into two groups of four teams. There was no seeding, except that hosts Belarus were assigned to position A1 in the draw.

== Venues ==
The tournament was hosted in five venues:

Barysaw		Minsk	
Borisov Arena	Haradski Stadium	Traktor Stadium	
Capacity: 13,126	Capacity: 5,402	Capacity: 16,500	
2016 UEFA Women's Under-17 Championship is located in Belarus		Slutsk	Zhodzina
2016 UEFA Women's Under-17 Championship is located in Belarus		City Stadium	Torpedo Stadium
2016 UEFA Women's Under-17 Championship is located in Belarus		Capacity: 1,896	Capacity: 6,524

== Squads ==
Each national team had to submit a squad of 18 players.

== Match officials ==
A total of 6 referees, 8 assistant referees and 2 fourth officials were appointed for the final tournament.

Referees

- Eleni Antoniou (Greece)
- Ana Aguiar (Portugal)
- Dimitrina Milkova (Bulgaria)
- Elvira Nurmustafina (Kazakhstan)
- Tess Olofsson (Sweden)
- Vera Opeikina (Russia)

Assistant referees

- Oleksandra Ardasheva (Ukraine)
- Emilie Aubry (Switzerland)
- Helena Buh (Slovenia)
- Yelena Jermolajeva (Latvia)
- Bianca H.P. Scheffers (Netherlands)
- Kinga Seniuk-Mikulska (Poland)
- Sibel Yamac Tamkafa (Turkey)
- Kristina Yanuskevich (Kazakhstan)

Fourth officials

- Volha Tsiareshka (Belarus)
- Irina Turovskaya (Belarus)

== Group stage ==
Results of teams participating at the 2016 UEFA Women's Under-17 Championship

The final tournament schedule was confirmed on 7 April 2016.

The group winners and runners-up advanced to the semi-finals.

Tiebreakers

The teams were ranked according to points (3 points for a win, 1 point for a draw, 0 points for a loss). If two or more teams were equal on points on completion of the group matches, the following tie-breaking criteria were applied, in the order given, to determine the rankings:

1. Higher number of points obtained in the group matches played among the teams in question;
2. Superior goal difference resulting from the group matches played among the teams in question;
3. Higher number of goals scored in the group matches played among the teams in question;
4. If, after having applied criteria 1 to 3, teams still had an equal ranking, criteria 1 to 3 were reapplied exclusively to the group matches between the teams in question to determine their final rankings. If this procedure did not lead to a decision, criteria 5 to 9 applied;
5. Superior goal difference in all group matches;
6. Higher number of goals scored in all group matches;
7. If only two teams have the same number of points, and they were tied according to criteria 1 to 6 after having met in the last round of the group stage, their rankings were determined by a penalty shoot-out (not used if more than two teams had the same number of points, or if their rankings were not relevant for qualification for the next stage).
8. Lower disciplinary points total based only on yellow and red cards received in the group matches (red card = 3 points, yellow card = 1 point, expulsion for two yellow cards in one match = 3 points);
9. Drawing of lots.

All times were local, FET (UTC+3).

=== Group A ===
Pos	Team	Pld	W	D	L	GF	GA	GD	Pts	Qualification
1	England	3	3	0	0	19	3	+16	9	Knockout stage
2	Norway	3	2	0	1	5	3	+2	6	Knockout stage
3	Serbia	3	1	0	2	6	6	0	3	
4	Belarus (H)	3	0	0	3	1	19	−18	0	

Source: UEFA
Rules for classification: Group stage tiebreakers
(H) Hosts
4 May 2016
16:00

Belarus	1–5	Serbia
Zhitko 68'	Report	Poljak 7'; Agbaba 30'; Ivanović 48'; Filipović 57'; Burkert 79'

Traktor Stadium, Minsk
Attendance: 4,500
Referee: Eleni Antoniou (Greece)
4 May 2016
16:30

England	3–2	Norway
Charles 16'; Russo 36'; Filbey 69'	Report	Haug 59', 62'

Torpedo Stadium, Zhodzina
Attendance: 2,600
Referee: Vera Opeykina (Russia)

7 May 2016
16:00

Belarus	0–12	England
	Report	Toone 5', 38'; Filbey 7', 19'; Russo 15', 23'; Stanway 29'; Cain 71', 75'; Smith 74', 80+5'; Brazil 80+1'

City Stadium, Slutsk
Attendance: 1,700
Referee: Ana Aguiar (Portugal)
7 May 2016
16:00

Serbia	0–1	Norway
	Report	Maanum 54'

Haradski Stadium, Barysaw
Attendance: 585
Referee: Elvira Nurmustafina (Kazakhstan)

10 May 2016
16:00

Norway	2–0	Belarus
Olsen 18'; Ruud 40'	Report

City Stadium, Slutsk
Attendance: 1,530
Referee: Dimitrina Milkova (Bulgaria)
10 May 2016
16:00

Serbia	1–4	England
Ivanović 40'	Report	Stanway 47' (pen.); Brazil 68'; Charles 71'; Cain 76'

Traktor Stadium, Minsk
Attendance: 500
Referee: Tess Olofsson (Sweden)

=== Group B ===
Pos	Team	Pld	W	D	L	GF	GA	GD	Pts	Qualification
1	Spain	3	2	1	0	6	3	+3	7	Knockout stage
2	Germany	3	1	2	0	6	2	+4	5	Knockout stage
3	Italy	3	0	2	1	1	3	−2	2	
4	Czech Republic	3	0	1	2	0	5	−5	1	

Source: UEFA
Rules for classification: Group stage tiebreakers
4 May 2016
16:30

Italy	0–0	Czech Republic
	Report

Haradski Stadium, Barysaw
Attendance: 1,730
Referee: Ana Aguiar (Portugal)
4 May 2016
16:30

Germany	2–2	Spain
Bühl 44', 74'	Report	Rubio 43'; Kleinherne 45' (o.g.)

City Stadium, Slutsk
Attendance: 1,826
Referee: Tess Olofsson (Sweden)

7 May 2016
16:00

Italy	0–0	Germany
	Report

Torpedo Stadium, Zhodzina
Attendance: 2,500
Referee: Vera Opeykina (Russia)
7 May 2016
16:00

Czech Republic	0–1	Spain
	Report	L. Navarro 54'

Traktor Stadium, Minsk
Attendance: 1,200
Referee: Dimitrina Milkova (Bulgaria)

10 May 2016
16:00

Spain	3–1	Italy
Blanco 10'; L. Navarro 29', 58'	Report	Glionna 62'

Torpedo Stadium, Zhodzina
Attendance: 2,400
Referee: Eleni Antoniou (Greece)
10 May 2016
16:00

Czech Republic	0–4	Germany
	Report	Ziegler 7', 22'; Müller 36', 51'

Haradski Stadium, Barysaw
Attendance: 250
Referee: Elvira Nurmustafina (Kazakhstan)

== Knockout stage ==
In the knockout stage, penalty shoot-out was used to decide the winner if necessary (no extra time was played).

There was a third place match (i.e., FIFA U-17 Women's World Cup play-off) for this edition of the tournament as it was used as a qualifier for the FIFA U-17 Women's World Cup (since expansion to eight teams).

=== Bracket ===
Semi-finals
13 May – Zhodzina
Spain	4
Norway	0
13 May – Zhodzina
England	3
Germany	4

Final
16 May – Barysaw
Spain	0 (2)
Germany (p)	0 (3)
Third place
16 May – Minsk
Norway	1
England	2

=== Semi-finals ===
Winners qualified for 2016 FIFA U-17 Women's World Cup.

13 May 2016
14:00

Spain	4–0	Norway
Rubio 48'; Na. Ramos 71'; L. Navarro 73', 76'	Report

Torpedo Stadium, Zhodzina
Attendance: 4,800
Referee: Vera Opeykina (Russia)

13 May 2016
19:00

England	3–4	Germany
Brazil 31'; Russo 42', 77'	Report	Ziegler 29', 70'; Bühl 41'; Pawollek 57'

Torpedo Stadium, Zhodzina
Attendance: 4,100
Referee: Tess Olofsson (Sweden)

=== Third place match ===
Winner qualified for 2016 FIFA U-17 Women's World Cup.

16 May 2016
15:00

Norway	1–2	England
Haug 52'	Report	Charles 8', 57'

Traktor Stadium, Minsk
Attendance: 4,180
Referee: Ana Aguiar (Portugal)

=== Final ===
16 May 2016
20:00

Spain	0–0	Germany
	Report
Penalties
Rodríguez (penalty missed); Monente (penalty scored); Andújar (penalty missed); L. Navarro (penalty missed); Na. Ramos (penalty scored)	2–3	(penalty scored) Gwinn; (penalty scored) Minge; (penalty missed) Pawollek; (penalty missed) Müller; (penalty scored) Siems

Borisov Arena, Barysaw
Attendance: 10,200
Referee: Eleni Antoniou (Greece)

== Goalscorers ==
5 goals

- (England) Alessia Russo
- (Spain) Lorena Navarro

4 goals

- (England) Niamh Charles
- (Germany) Vanessa Ziegler

3 goals

- (England) Ellie Brazil
- (England) Hannah Cain
- (England) Anna Filbey
- (Germany) Klara Bühl
- (Norway) Sophie Haug

2 goals

- (England) Grace Smith
- (England) Georgia Stanway
- (England) Ella Ann Toone
- (Germany) Marie Müller
- (Serbia) Miljana Ivanović
- (Spain) Silvia Rubio

1 goal

- (Belarus) Karolina Zhitko
- (Germany) Tanja Pawollek
- (Italy) Benedetta Glionna
- (Norway) Frida Maanum
- (Norway) Ingrid Olsen
- (Norway) Emilia Ruud
- (Serbia) Jovana Agbaba
- (Serbia) Teodora Burkert
- (Serbia) Tijana Filipović
- (Serbia) Allegra Poljak
- (Spain) María Blanco
- (Spain) Natalia Ramos

1 own goal

- (Germany) Sophia Kleinherne (playing against Spain)

Source: UEFA.com

== Team of the Tournament ==
Goalkeepers

- (Serbia) Tanja Djapić
- (Spain) Noelia Ramos

Defenders

- (Czech Republic) Markéta Klímová
- (Germany) Tanja Pawollek
- (Germany) Caroline Siems
- (Spain) Laia Aleixandri
- (Spain) Ona Batlle
- (Spain) Lucía Rodríguez

Midfielders

- (England) Georgia Stanway
- (Germany) Janina Minge
- (Norway) Frida Maanum
- (Spain) Paula Fernández
- (Spain) Silvia Rubio

Forwards

- (England) Alessia Russo
- (Germany) Klara Bühl
- (Germany) Giulia Gwinn
- (Serbia) Allegra Poljak
- (Spain) Candela Andújar

Source: UEFA Technical Report

== Qualified teams for FIFA U-17 Women's World Cup ==
The following three teams from UEFA qualified for the FIFA U-17 Women's World Cup.

Team	Qualified on	Previous appearances in tournament^{1}
Germany	13 May 2016	4 (2008, 2010, 2012, 2014)
Spain	13 May 2016	2 (2010, 2014)
England	16 May 2016	1 (2008)

^{1} Bold indicates champion for that year. Italic indicates host for that year.
