= Baştürk =

Baştürk is a Turkish surname. Notable people with the surname include:

- Nihat Baştürk (born 1973), Turkish footballer
- Selçuk Baştürk (born 1986), Turkish footballer
- Yıldıray Baştürk (born 1978), Turkish footballer
