= Selçuk (disambiguation) =

Selçuk (modern Turkish for "Seljuk") is a district and town of İzmir Province, Turkey.

Selçuk may also refer to:

- Selçuk (name), a Turkish masculine given name
- Selçuk University
- Uyanış: Büyük Selçuklu, a Turkish television series

== See also ==
- Selcuk (disambiguation)
- Seljuk (disambiguation)
