= State road D.515 (Turkey) =

Highway between Selçuk and Söke in Turkey

D.515

Route information
- Length: 42 km (26 mi)

Major junctions
- North end: Selçuk
- South end: Söke

Location
- Country: Turkey

Highway system
- Highways in Turkey; Motorways; List; State Highways; List

D.515 is a north-to-south state road in southwestern Turkey, running from Selçuk in İzmir Province to Söke in Aydın Province.

It starts at the D.550 in Selçuk, and ends at the D.525 in Söke.

The road is entirely a dual carriageway, and passes through the key tourist area of Kuşadası. The road passes Selçuk–Efes Airport, and provides a road link between Kuşadası and Ephesus. It passes many holiday resort hotels, and Adaland Aquapark.

== Itinerary ==
Province	Location	Distance from Selçuk (km)	Distance from Selçuk (mile)	Distance from Söke (km)	Distance from Söke (mile)
İzmir	Selçuk	0	0	42.0	21.6
Aydın	Bayraklıdede	15.2	9.4	26.8	16.7
Aydın	Kuşadası	20.0	12.4	22.0	13.7
Aydın	Yaylaköy	32.6	20.3	9.4	5.8
Aydın	Söke	42.0	21.6	0	0
