= Altınordu Selçuk-Efes Football Complex =

Sporting venue in Turkey

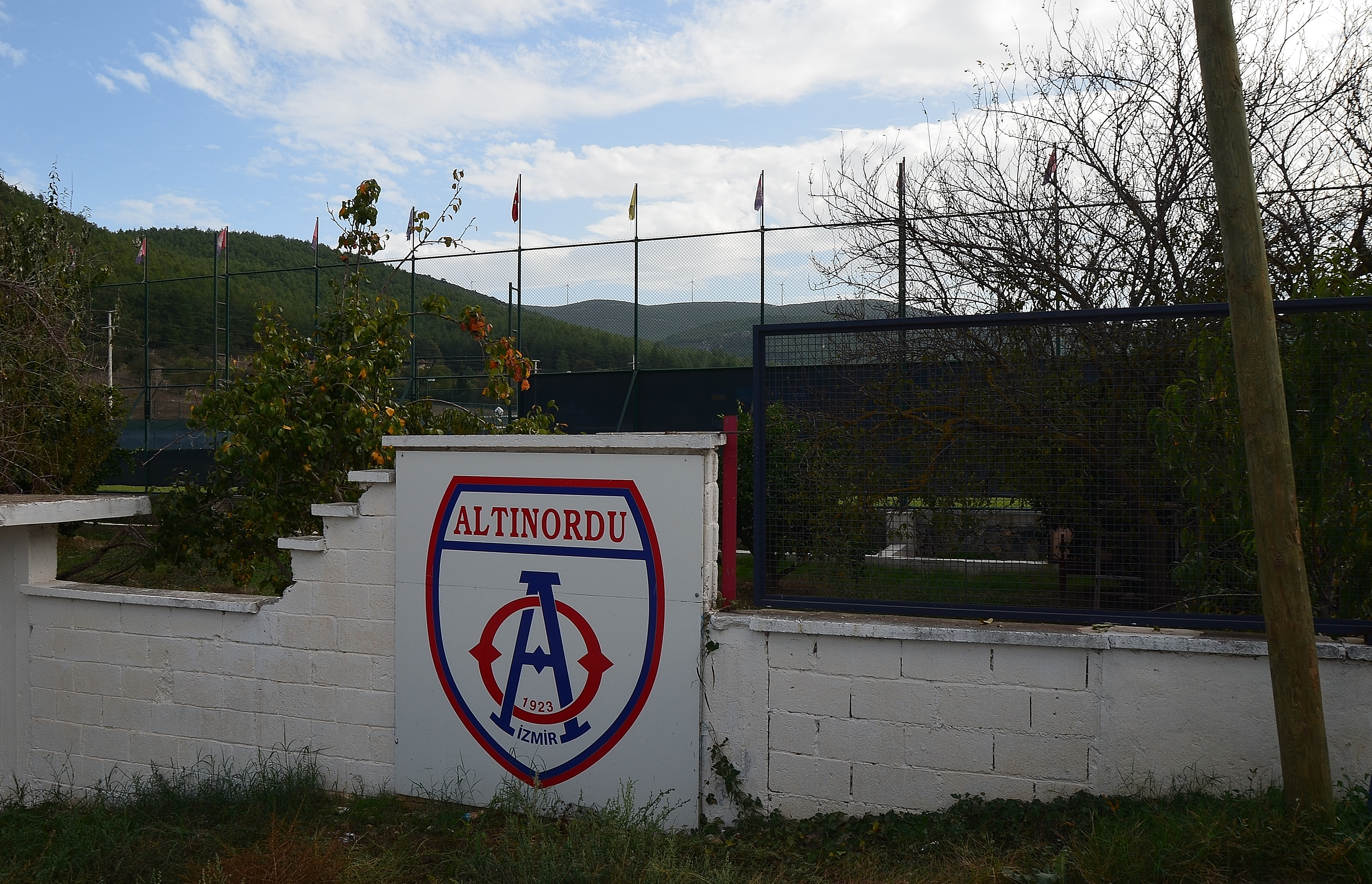
- Interactive map of Altınordu Selçuk-Efes Football Complex
- Full name: Altınordu Selçuk Efes Tesisleri
- Location: Selçuk İzmir Province, Turkey
- Coordinates: 37°55′30″N 27°18′20″E
- Operator: Altınordu S.K.

Construction
- Renovated: 2012

Tenant
- Altınordu S.K.

Altınordu Selçuk-Efes Football Complex (Turkey)

Altınordu Selçuk-Efes Football Complex (Turkish: Altınordu Selçuk Efes Futbol Tesisleri), shortly ASEFT, is a sport complex of football stadiums operated by the football club Altınordu S.K., and is located in Selçuk town of İzmir Province in western Turkey.

The sport complex is situated on the state road D.515 WSW of Ephesus and Selçuk, at a distance of 45 km (28 mi) to the city center of İzmir and 72 km (45 mi) to the Adnan Menderes Airport. With its total area of 100,000 m^{2} (25 acres), the complex is the largest sports venue in İzmir Province.

Leased in 2012 by the İzmir-based Altınordu S.K., it consists of five football fields, and is home to the youth football teams Altınordu S.K. Following the lease, two pitches were completely renovated. All pitches are of natural grass ground but one is covered with organic granular material and special artificial grass.

== International events hosted ==
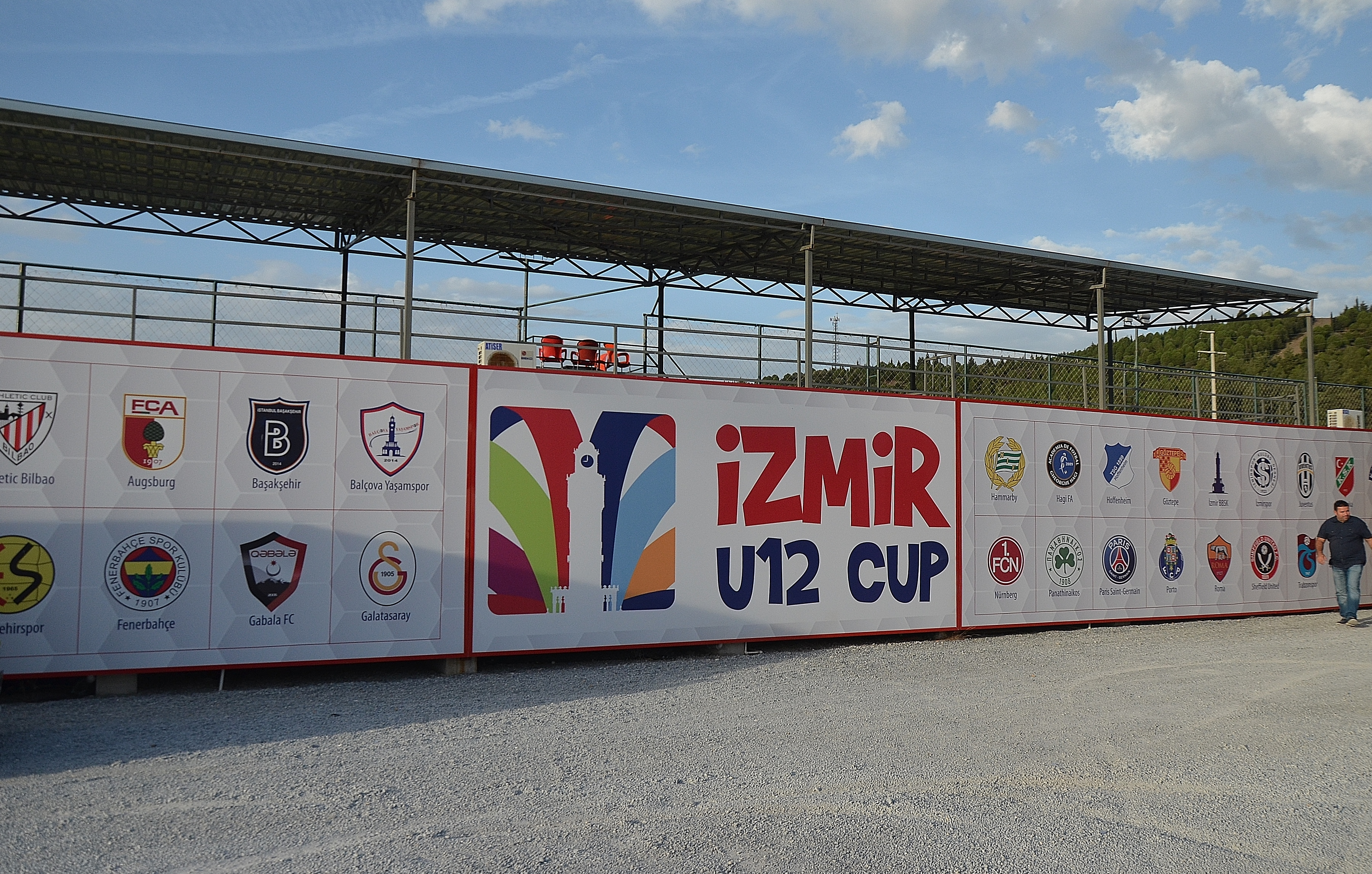
Stadium wall with the logos of the participating teams at the 2015 İzmir U-12 Cup

- 2015 İzmir U-12 Cup: 48 teams from 20 nations - April 3–5, 2015
- 2016 UEFA Women's Under-17 Championship qualification - Group 1 - October 15–20, 2015
