= Jennifer Klein (footballer) =

Austrian footballer

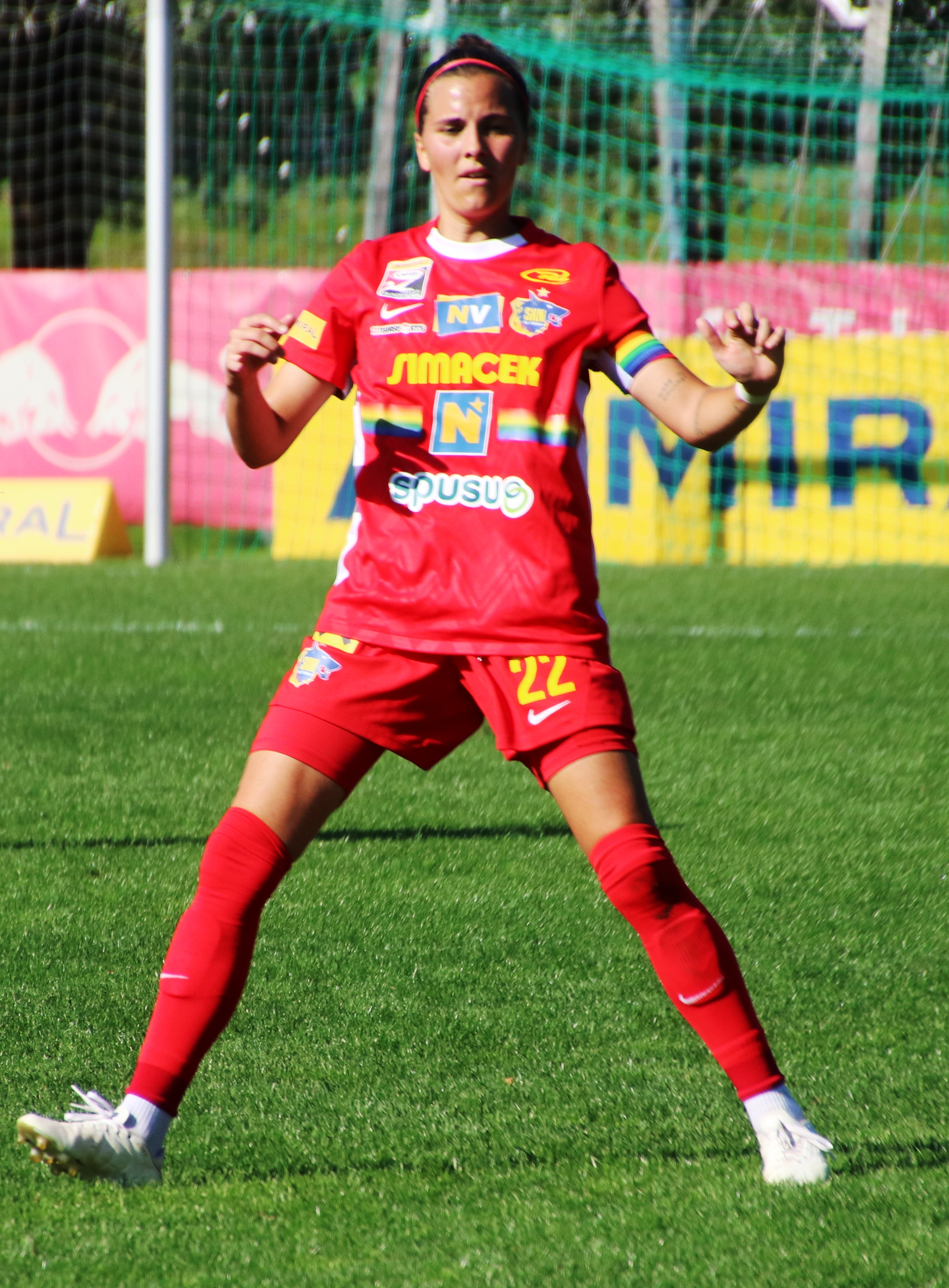
- Klein with SKN St. Pölten in 2025

Personal information
- Date of birth: 11 January 1999 (age 27)
- Place of birth: Tulln, Austria
- Height: 1.70 m (5 ft 7 in)
- Position: Midfielder

Team information
- Current team: SKN St. Pölten
- Number: 20

Senior career*
Years	Team	Apps	(Gls)
2013–2017	SV Neulengbach	28	(1)
2017–2019	SKN St. Pölten	25	(1)
2018–2020	1899 Hoffenheim II	35	(8)
2019–2020	1899 Hoffenheim	1	(0)
2020–	SKN St. Pölten	16	(3)

International career^{‡}
2014–2016	Austria U17	12	(5)
2016–2017	Austria U19	6	(2)
2017–	Austria	24	(2)
- * Club domestic league appearances and goals as of 22 May 2025 ‡ National team caps and goals as of 14 October 2026

Jennifer Klein (born 11 January 1999) is an Austrian footballer who plays as a midfielder for SKN St. Pölten in the ÖFB-Frauenliga.

== Club career ==
Klein played from July 2013 until July 2017 at SV Neulengbach. After the UEFA Women's Euro 2017, she signed with SKN St. Pölten.

== International career ==
Klein represented Austria at the 2015 UEFA Women's Under-17 Championship qualification. She started all six matches Austria played in the competition and scored three goals. Klein was also part of the squad who represented Austria at the 2016 UEFA Women's Under-17 Championship qualification. Again, she started in all six matches her team played in the competition and scored two goals. Klein also represented Austria at the 2017 UEFA Women's Under-19 Championship qualification. She played three matches and scored one goal. In the 2018 UEFA Women's Under-19 Championship qualification, she also played three matches and scored one goal.

On 1 July 2017, Klein was included by coach Dominik Thalhammer in the 23-women squad who represented Austria at the UEFA Women's Euro 2017. The team reached the semi-finals, but she didn't play any match. On 23 November 2017, Klein made her debut for Austria in a qualification match for the 2019 FIFA Women's World Cup against Israel. She replaced Nadine Prohaska in the game's 64th minute.

== Career statistics ==
=== International goals ===
Scores and results list Austria's goal tally first:

Klein – goals for Austria
#	Date	Location	Opponent	Score	Result	Competition
1.	27 February 2019	AEK Arena, Larnaca, Cyprus	Nigeria	4–1	4–1	2019 Cyprus Women's Cup
2.	28 October 2025	Franz Horr Stadium, Vienna, Austria	Czech Republic	2–0	2–0	2025 UEFA Women's Nations League play-off matches
