= SS Nisbet Grammer =

British ship that operated of the North American Great Lakes

Coordinates: 43.486085°N 78.726060°W

- Nisbet Grammer

History

United Kingdom
- Name: Nisbet Grammer
- Operator: Eastern Steamship Company
- Port of registry: United Kingdom, Liverpool, England
- Builder: Cammell Laird & Company, Birkenhead
- Laid down: February 2, 1923
- Launched: April 14, 1923
- Out of service: May 31, 1926
- Identification: British Registry #146208
- Fate: Rammed by Dalwarnic on Lake Ontario

General characteristics
- Class & type: Canaller
- Tonnage: 1,725 GRT; 1,110 NRT
- Length: 253 ft (77 m)
- Beam: 43.3 ft (13.2 m)
- Height: 20 ft (6.1 m)
- Installed power: 2 × Scotch marine boilers
- Propulsion: Triple expansion steam engine

Nisbet Grammer was a lake freighter that served on the Great Lakes from her commissioning in 1923 until her sinking in 1926.

== Sinking ==
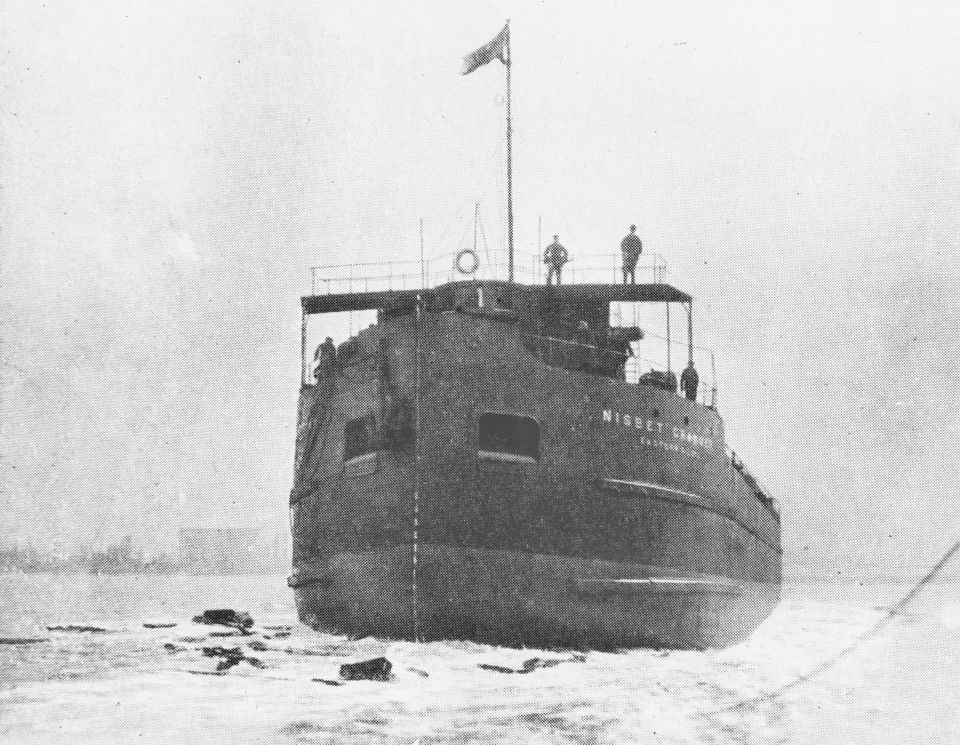
Bow view of the Nisbet Grammer

She sank on May 26, 1926, after the Dalwarnic, a freighter of similar size, collided with her. Dalwarnic's bow pierced one of her holds, but all her crew were rescued. Both vessels encountered a fog bank on the night of the collision, about 30 miles (48 km), east of the Niagara River. The Nisbet Grammer had reduced her speed to half-speed. Still, the vessels were too close to avoid a collision when they sighted one another in reduced visibility of the fog bank. She sank in fifteen minutes, in 500 feet (150 m) of water.

== Location ==
The exact location of her wreck was unknown for 88 years, until an expedition found it off Somerset, New York. Researchers searched for the wreck for six years. The wreck is the largest steel-hulled shipwreck in Lake Ontario.
