= Dalwarnic =

Freight vessel

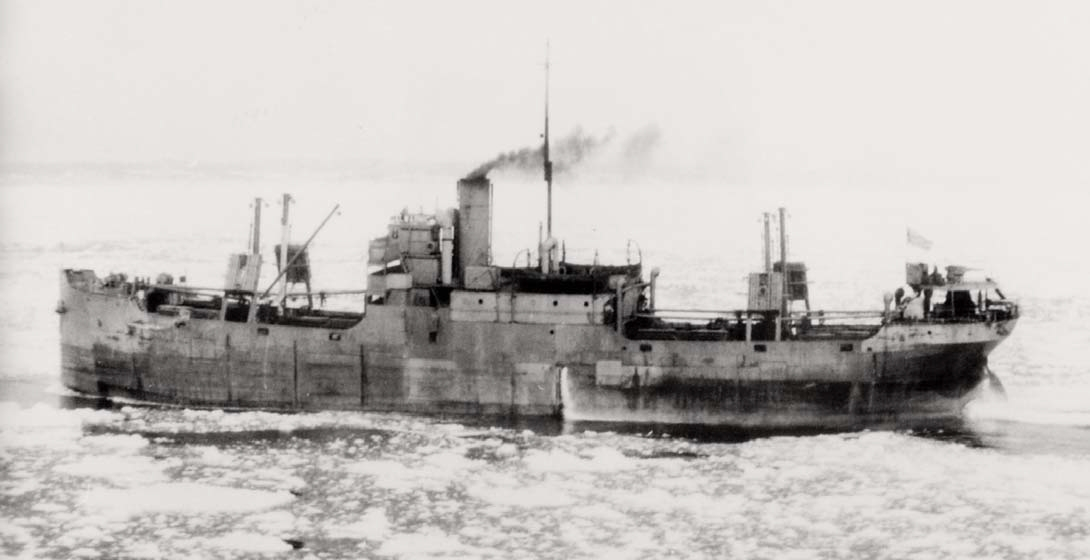
The Dalwarnic in wartime service

Dalwarnic was the name of a small Canadian-built freighter. She was built in Port Arthur, Ontario (now Thunder Bay) in 1921, by Port Arthur Shipbuilding. She was built for the Canadian Government which commissioned her as Canadian Harvester. She sailed under that name until 1926, when she was acquired by the Canadian Atlantic Transit Company. That is when she acquired the name she was best known by - Dalwarnic.

The vessel was designed with her bridge amidships, not the bridge right up in the bow that was traditional for lake freighters, although she spent much of her first two decades on the Great Lakes.

On May 26, 1926 the Dalwarnic struck another freighter, the Nisbet Grammer, off Somerset, New York. The Nisbet Grammer sank, but her crew were rescued. She was the largest steel-hulled shipwreck in Lake Ontario. The Milwaukee Sentinel reported that Dalwarnic was owned by the Canadian National Railway.

The Dalwarnic was requisitioned into Government service in 1940, and carried supplies to Newfoundland outports.

Sources differ as to what happened to the Dalwarnic after World War II. The academic site Maritime History of the Great Lakes collection has an old, faded, newspaper clipping, that asserts she was sold to Panamanian interests in 1946, before being sold to Turkish interests, who renamed her Selcuk. However, a 2015 article about her collision with the Nisbet Grammer describes her being acquired by Swedish interests and renamed Selcuk in 1948. Both names would be forms of the Turkish Selçuk, the modern form of Seljuk, and both sources agree that she was scrapped in Turkey in 1967.

specifications
power	124 shaft horsepower (92 kW)
length	251 feet (77 m)
width	43.6 feet (13.3 m)
draft	23.7 feet (7.2 m)
tonnage	gross tons / 2394; net tons / 1428
