= Selçuk (name) =

- Gender: Masculine
- Language: Turkish

Origin
- Language: Turkish

Selçuk, sometimes anglicized as Selcuk, Seljuk, or Seljuq, is a common masculine Turkish given name. It is the modern Turkish form of Seljuq or Seljuk, the name of the eponymous founder of the Seljuq dynasty. The name was used as a surname from the early 20th century and became popular as a given name by the mid 20th century.

== Given name ==
- Selçuk (leader), Turkish warlord, founder of the Seljuq dynasty
- Selçuk Alagöz (1944–2025), Turkish singer-songwriter
- Selçuk Alibaz (born 1989), Turkish footballer
- Selçuk Altun (born 1950), Turkish writer, publisher, and retired banking executive
- Selçuk Aydın (born 1983), Turkish boxer
- Selçuk Baştürk (born 1986), Turkish footballer
- Selçuk Dereli (born 1969), Turkish football referee
- Selçuk Eker (born 1991), Turkish amateur boxer
- Selçuk İnan (born 1985), Turkish footballer
- Selçuk Şahin (footballer born 1981) (born 1981), Turkish footballer who plays for Fenerbahçe
- Selçuk Şahin (footballer born 1983) (born 1983), Turkish footballer who plays for Orduspor
- Selçuk Uluergüven (1941–2014), Turkish actor
- Selçuk Yula (1959–2013), Turkish footballer

== Surname ==
- İlhan Selçuk (1925–2010), Turkish lawyer, journalist, author, novelist, and editor
- Münir Nurettin Selçuk (1900–1981), Turkish classical musician and tenor singer
- Timur Selçuk (1946–2020), Turkish pop music singer, pianist, conductor, and composer
- Zehra Zümrüt Selçuk Koç (born 1979), Turkish female government minister

== See also ==
- Selçuk (ship), a variant form of this name
- Seljuq (disambiguation)
- Seljuk (disambiguation)
- Selçuk (disambiguation)
