= Selçuk–Efes Airport =

Selçuk–Efes Airport Selçuk-Efes Havaalanı
- IATA: none; ICAO: LTFB

Summary
- Airport type: Public/Civil
- Owner: Turkish Aeronautical Association (Turkish: Türk Hava Kurumu, THK)
- Operator: Turkish Aeronautical Association (Turkish: Türk Hava Kurumu, THK)
- Serves: İzmir, Turkey
- Location: Selçuk, İzmir, Turkey
- Opened: 1993; 33 years ago
- Elevation AMSL: 3 m / 10 ft
- Coordinates: 37°57′02″N 27°19′45″E

Map
- Location of airport in Turkey

Runways
Direction	Length		Surface
Direction	m	ft	Surface
09/27	1,800	6,692	Paved

Selçuk–Efes Airport (Turkish: Selçuk-Efes Havaalanı) (ICAO: LTFB) is a public airport located at Selçuk town in İzmir Province, Turkey.

The airport is operated by the Turkish Aeronautical Association (Turkish: Türk Hava Kurumu, THK). Situated 83 km (52 mi) south of İzmir and close to the famous antique city of Ephesus, it was opened in 1993. The airport also hosts activities such as microlight flights, skydiving and training for flying both private and commercial aircraft.

== See also ==
- İzmir Adnan Menderes Airport
