= Ayasuluk Hill =

Ancient mound and part of Ephesus UNESCO World Heritage Site

Coordinates: 37°57′19″N 27°22′04″E

Ayasuluk Hill (Turkish: Ayasuluk Tepesi; Medieval Greek: Θεολόγος, romanized: Theológos) is an ancient mound in İzmir Province in Turkey. It forms part of the Ephesus UNESCO World Heritage Site, and is home to a Byzantine fortress and the ruins of the Basilica of St John. It was reputedly the tomb of John the Apostle, the cousin and early disciple of Jesus who is thought to have written the Gospel of John on the site. It became the main settlement of Ephesus after the ancient town declined after the 7th century, following the onset of the Arab–Byzantine wars.

== History ==
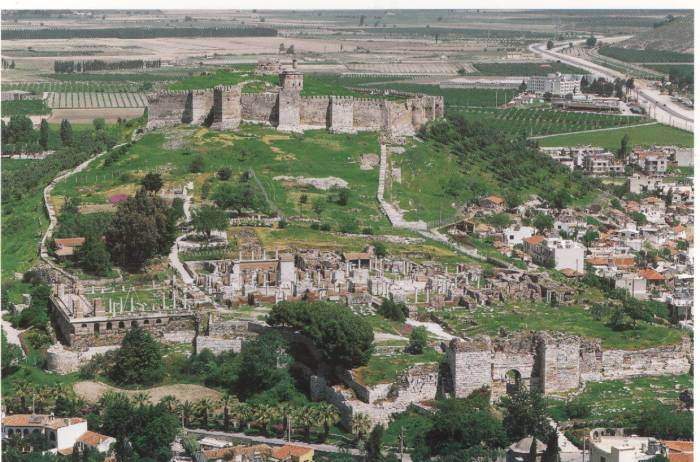
Basilica of St John and the Ayasuluk Castle

The earliest archaeological remains at the site date back to the late Chalcolithic and the Early Bronze Age. In this era, the sea would have reached the hill's western slope. During the Late Bronze Age, the hill was fortified and tholos tombs were cut into its side. Finds from this era include Mycenaean pottery and seals. This settlement is believed to be Apasa, the capital of the Kingdom of Arzawa.

A mausoleum for St John was replaced by a basilica church on the site in the 5th century AD, but was damaged by earthquakes in the 6th century. Egeria had planned to visit the church in the 4th century. It was then rebuilt by East Roman emperor Justinian the Great as a basilica in the 6th century. The church was a domed cruciform basilica begun in 535/6; enormous and lavishly decorated, it was built in the same style as Justinian's Church of the Holy Apostles in Constantinople. The basilica became one of the wonders of the medieval world, being constructed during a significant building programme which also included the Hagia Sophia in Constantinople and the Basilica of Sant'Apollinare Nuovo in Ravenna. The hill's medieval Greek name, Theologos, was derived from Άγιος Θεολόγος, Hagios Theológos, 'Holy Theologian', after the Apostle's title of 'St John the Theologian'. The basilica took inspiration from the nearby Temple of Artemis.

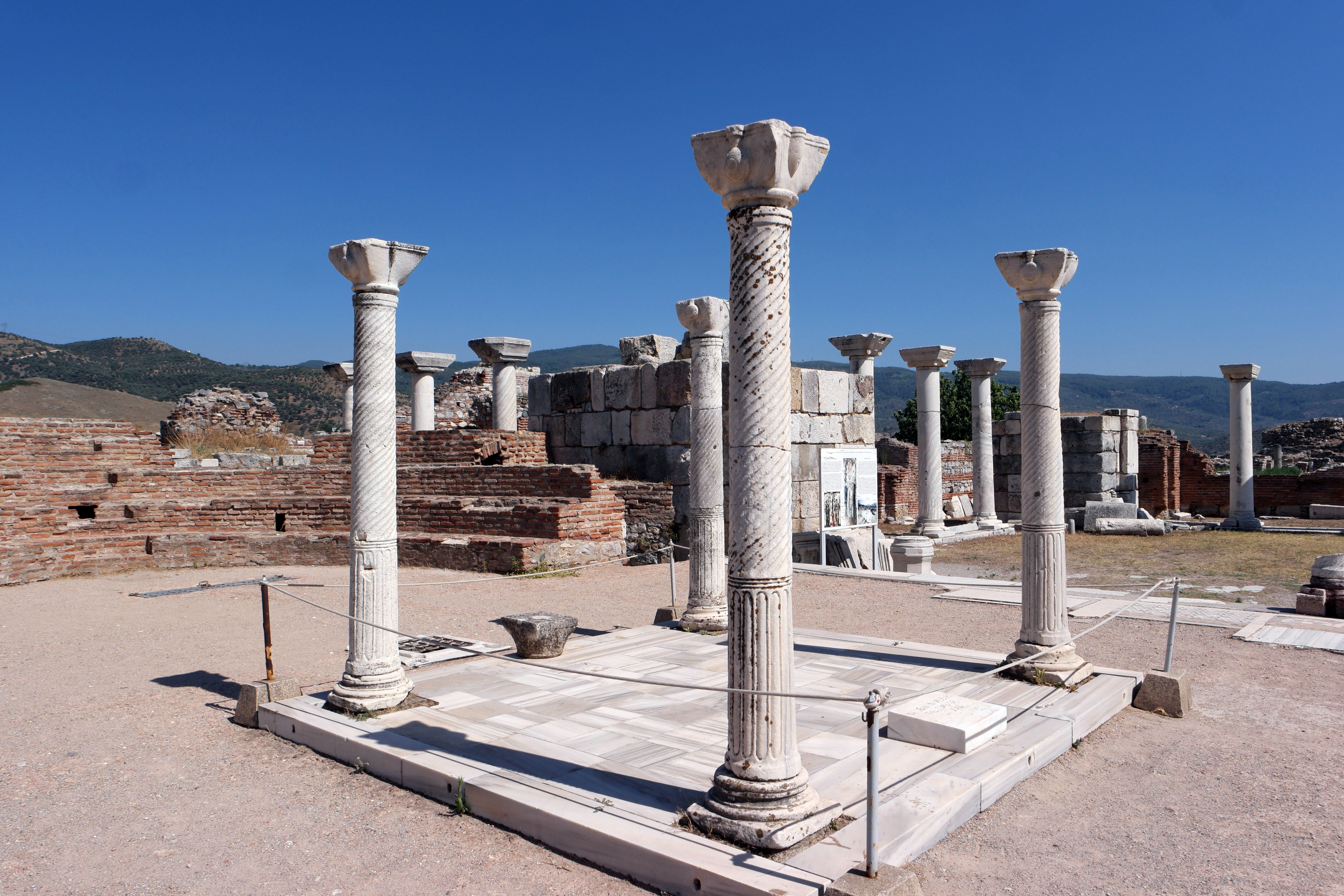
Tomb of St John the Apostle within the St John Basilica

The remains of a 2,130-foot (650 m) aqueduct branch built to supply the hill with water probably dates from Justinian's reign.

Recent archaeology has shown that the town of Ephesus may have lost its importance already prior to the Muslim conquest of the Levant, with the silting up of its important harbour and the appearance of malaria. As a result, the population of Ephesus moved from the sea shore to Ayasuluk Hill. Following the Arab invasions of the 7th century, a fortress was built to protect the basilica.

In 1304 the Seljuq dynasty captured the area and transformed the basilica into a mosque. In 1402 the basilica was destroyed by an invasion under the command of Timur. The Byzantine fortress was later restored by both Seljuk and Ottoman rulers of the area. The hill's Turkish language name, Ayasuluk Höyük is derived from the medieval Greek name, Agios Theológos.

The area was occupied by Greece between 1920 and 1922, during the Greco-Turkish War (1919–1922). Greek archaeologist G. A. Sotiou excavated the burial site of St John; Sotiou found it empty, as the relics had been removed to the Church of the Holy Apostles in Constantinople in the 6th century.

After the formation of the Turkish Republic in 1923, parts of the basilica were rebuilt with financial support from religious foundations in the United States. Ephesus was added to the UNESCO World Heritage List in 2015, and today the areas that form part of the site receive millions of visitors every year.
