= Vanessa Ziegler =

German footballer (born 1999)

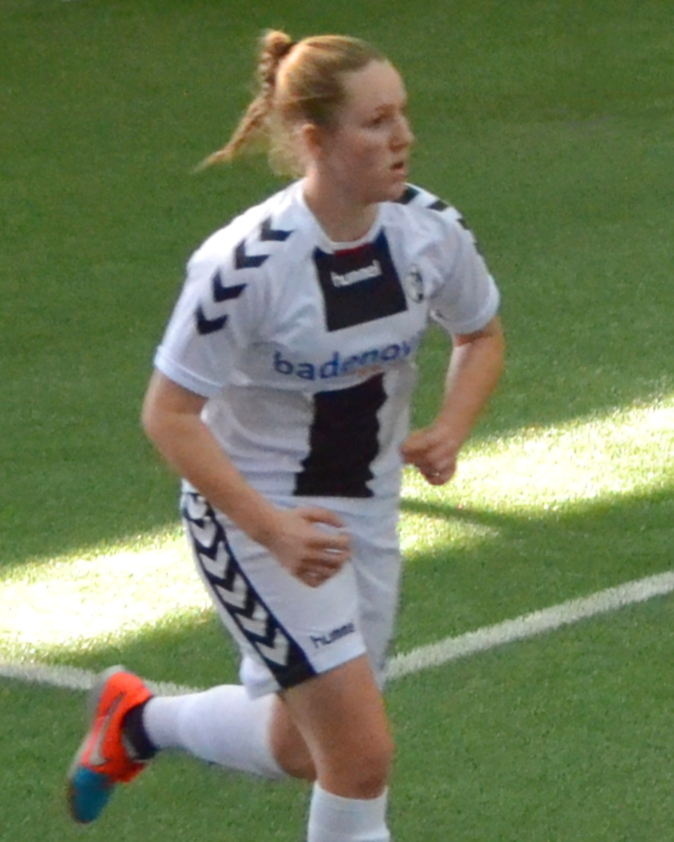

Personal information
- Date of birth: 16 January 1999 (age 27)
- Height: 1.72 m (5 ft 8 in)
- Position: Midfielder

Team information
- Current team: SC Freiburg

Vanessa Ziegler (born 16 January 1999) is a German footballer who plays as a midfielder for SC Freiburg.

== International career ==
Ziegler has reperesented Germany at youth level.
