= Yuliya Larionova =

Azerbaijani football referee and player (born 1984)

Personal information
- Date of birth: 18 August 1984 (age 42)
- Position: Forward

Senior career*
Years	Team	Apps	(Gls)
- Gömrükçü Baku

International career^{‡}
2010	Azerbaijan	5	(0)
- * Club domestic league appearances and goals ‡ National team caps and goals as of 25 August 2010

Yuliya Larionova (born 18 August 1984) is an Azerbaijani football referee and a former player who played as a forward. She has been a member of the Azerbaijan women's national team.
