= Camilla Huseby =

Norwegian footballer (born 1999)

Personal information
- Date of birth: 12 April 1999 (age 27)
- Place of birth: Lørenskog, Norway
- Height: 1.76 m (5 ft 9 in)
- Positions: Centre-back; full-back

Team information
- Current team: Kolbotn

Youth career
- –2013: Ås
- 2014–2015: Kolbotn

Senior career*
Years	Team	Apps	(Gls)
2015–2016	Kolbotn	6	(1)
2017–2019	Lyn	66	(0)
2020	Djurgården	21	(1)
2021–2022	Vålerenga	28	(1)
2023–2024	LSK Kvinner	42	(2)
2025–	Kolbotn	14	(0)

International career^{‡}
2014	Norway U15	4	(1)
2015	Norway U16	12	(1)
2016	Norway U17	12	(1)
2016–2018	Norway U19	22	(0)
2019–2020	Norway U23	7	(0)
- * Club domestic league appearances and goals as of 12 July 2026 ‡ National team caps and goals as of 12 July 2026

Camilla Huseby (born 12 April 1999) is a Norwegian footballer who plays as a defender for Norwegian First Division club Kolbotn IL.

== Career ==
Born in Lørenskog at Akershus University Hospital, she grew up in Ås and started her career in Ås IL. She made her international debut for Norway U15 in 2014, as she also joined the bigger neighboring club, Kolbotn IL. Her Toppserien debut came in August 2015, in a 10–0 thrashing of Medkila, followed by her first Toppserien goal in November 2016 against Trondheims-Ørn.

In the 2017 First Division, Huseby had changed clubs to Lyn and was named Player of the Year. The team won promotion to the Toppserien in the same year. She contested the 2018 UEFA Women's Under-19 Championship. After three seasons in Lyn, Huseby needed "a new challenge". In 2020 she was persuaded to move to the Damallsvenskan with Djurgårdens IF. The COVID-19 pandemic in Sweden and Norway meant a curtailing of the free travel between the countries, and as such, Huseby chose to move back to Norway after the 2020 campaign.

She joined Vålerenga, the rival of her former club Lyn, then went on to Vålerenga's other rival, LSK Kvinner FK ahead of the 2023 season. In January 2025, Huseby rejoined her childhood club Kolbotn.

== Personal life ==
She is a twin sister of Linn Huseby. They played for the same teams until 2020.
