= Tanja Pawollek =

Polish footballer (born 1999)

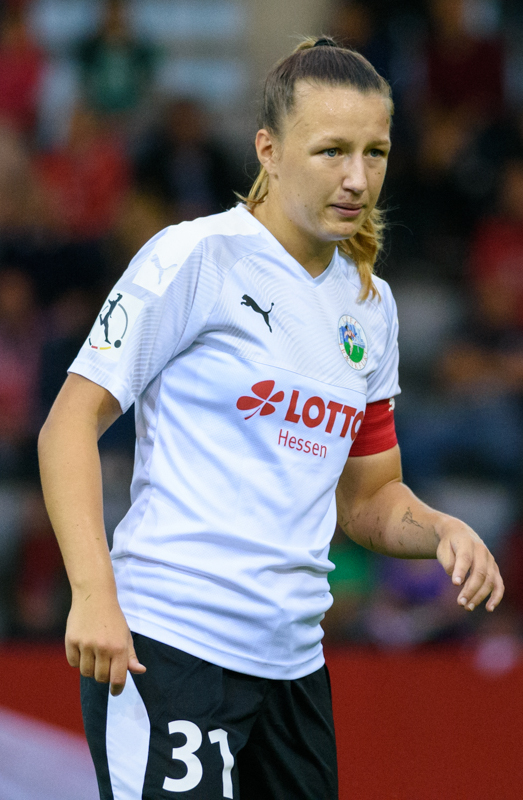
- Pawollek with 1. FFC Frankfurt in 2019

Personal information
- Date of birth: 18 January 1999 (age 27)
- Place of birth: Obertshausen, Germany
- Height: 1.70 m (5 ft 7 in)
- Position: Midfielder

Team information
- Current team: Union Berlin
- Number: 31

Youth career
- 2004–2010: TV Hausen
- 2010–2016: SG Rosenhöhe

Senior career*
Years	Team	Apps	(Gls)
2014–2016	1. FFC Frankfurt II	2	(1)
2016–2025	Eintracht Frankfurt (Note: 1. FFC Frankfurt changed its name to Eintracht Frankfurt in 2020.)	155	(21)
2022–2024	Eintracht Frankfurt II	7	(0)
2025–	Union Berlin	14	(0)

International career^{‡}
2013–2014	Germany U15	3	(3)
2014–2015	Germany U16	6	(0)
2015–2016	Germany U17	20	(3)
2017	Germany U19	11	(1)
2017–2018	Germany U20	9	(0)
2022–	Poland	33	(2)
Medal record
Representing Germany
Women's football
UEFA Women's Under-17 Championship
Winner	2016 Belarus
- * Club domestic league appearances and goals as of 17:50, 23 April 2026 (UTC) ‡ National team caps and goals as of 18:26, 18 April 2026 (UTC)

Tanja Pawollek (born 18 January 1999) is a professional footballer who plays as a midfielder for Frauen-Bundesliga club Union Berlin. Born in Germany, she plays for the Poland national team.

== Club career ==
Pawollek started her club career aged 5 at TV Hausen. After 6 years at her hometown club she moved to SG Rosenhöhe where she rose through the ranks up to the boy's under 17 team. In summer 2016 she signed for a 3-year contract with Bundesliga side 1. FFC Frankfurt. After just playing a 90 minutes match 2. Frauen-Bundesliga for the 1.FFC reserves team on 28 August 2016 against TSG Hoffenheim reserves, she debuted in the Bundesliga on 4 September 2016 against Borussia Mönchengladbach when she was subbed in for Saskia Bartusiak in the 68th minute. Pawollek would win the bronze Fritz Walter Medal in 2016 and the gold medal in 2018.

Pawollek scored her first Bundesliga goal on 30 April 2017 in a 2–2 away draw at Bayer 04 Leverkusen. She has captained the team since the 2019–20 season. Pawollek helped Eintracht Frankfurt reach the final of the 2020–21 DFB-Pokal Frauen, where she would suffer a serious knee injury.

In July 2020, 1. FFC Frankfurt was integrated into Eintracht Frankfurt, forming the clubs's women's football section.

In February 2023, Pawollek signed a contract extension to remain at Eintracht Frankfurt until 30 June 2025.

On 30 May 2025, Pawollek moved on a free transfer to Frauen-Bundesliga newcomers Union Berlin.

== International career ==
Since the first call up for the Germany under-15 national team on 30 October 2013 against Scotland, when she contributed a goal, Pawollek became a regular member for Germany's youth teams with 49 appearances, including being named to the Team of the Tournament in the 2016 UEFA Women's Under-17 Championship won by Germany. In December 2018, Martina Voss-Tecklenburg called her up for Germany during the winter training camp between 14 and 21 January 2019 in Marbella, Spain.

In May 2021, Pawollek, whose parents were born in Poland, was called up to the Poland national team. However, she could not play due to an injury. In June 2022, she was called up again and made her debut in a friendly match against Iceland on 29 June 2022. She also made two appearances for Poland in the 2023 FIFA Women's World Cup qualifiers against Kosovo and Albania, and in friendlies in 2023.

== Career statistics ==
=== International ===
As of match played 18 April 2026

Appearances and goals by national team and year
National team	Year	Apps	Goals
Poland	2022	6	0
Poland	2023	10	1
Poland	2024	4	0
Poland	2025	9	0
Poland	2026	4	1
Total		33	2

Scores and results list Poland's goal tally first, score column indicates score after each Pawollek goal.

List of international goals scored by Tanja Pawollek
No.	Date	Venue	Opponent	Score	Result	Competition
1	22 September 2023	Georgios Kamaras Stadium, Athens, Greece	Greece	3–1	3–1	2023–24 UEFA Nations League
2	14 April 2026	Gdańsk Stadium, Gdańsk, Poland	Republic of Ireland	1–2	2–3	2027 FIFA Women's World Cup qualification

== Honours ==
Germany U17

- UEFA Under-17 Championship: 2016
