= Leyre Monente =

Spanish footballer (born 2000)

Personal information
- Full name: Leyre Monente Aicua
- Date of birth: February 15, 2000 (age 26)
- Place of birth: Logroño, Spain
- Height: 1.67 m (5 ft 6 in)
- Positions: Forward; attacking midfielder

Youth career
- Loyola
- Peña Balsamaiso
- Comillas

Senior career*
Years	Team	Apps	(Gls)
2014–2015	EdF Logroño		
2015–2021	Athletic Club B	62	(30)
2016–2023	Athletic Club	32	(2)
2023–	Alavés	43	(2)

International career^{‡}
2015–2016	Spain U17	10	(2)
- * Club domestic league appearances and goals as of 25 July 2025 ‡ National team caps and goals as of 23:04, 3 April 2022 (UTC)

Leyre Monente Aicua (born 15 February 2000) is a Spanish footballer who plays for Alavés Gloriosas as a forward or attacking midfielder. She began her career with Athletic Club.

Having made her Primera División debut for Athletic aged 16 in 2016, her early career was disrupted by serious injuries, including a torn anterior cruciate ligament plus other issues in 2017 which kept her out for more than a year, and a shoulder problem which required surgery in late 2019 but then recurred in 2021, just after she had re-established herself in the Athletic squad and been confirmed as having moved up from the B-team on a permanent basis. She finally made a first appearance of the 2021–22 season as a substitute against Valencia on 2 April 2022. She departed the club in May 2023 and signed for Alavés two months later.

Monente was selected for the Spain age-group squads that won the UEFA Women's Under-17 Championship in 2015 and finished runners-up in 2016; she also claimed a bronze medal at the 2016 FIFA U-17 Women's World Cup.

Her experiences with injuries and the enforced breaks from playing led her to pursue a course in physiotherapy as a possible future career.
