= Rohrendorf bei Krems =

- Municipality
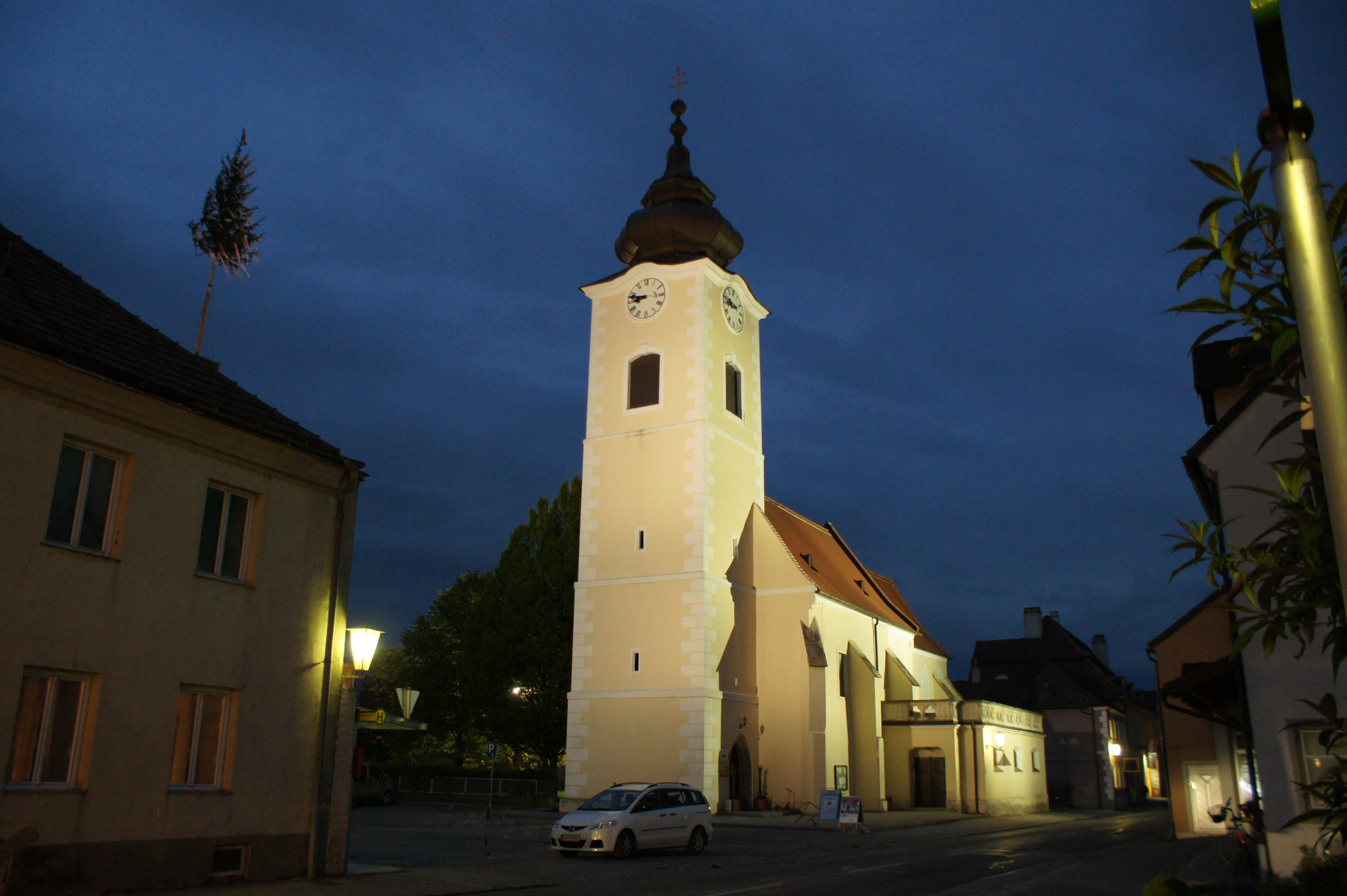
- Rohrendorf parish church

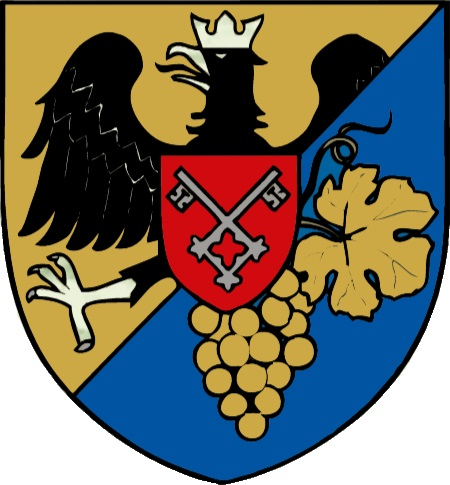
- Coat of arms

- Location within Austria
- Coordinates: 48°25′N 15°39′E
- Country: Austria
- State: Lower Austria
- District: Krems-Land

Government
  - Mayor: Rudolf Danner

Area
  - Total: 9.77 km^{2} (3.77 sq mi)
- Elevation: 194 m (636 ft)

Population (2018-01-01)
  - Total: 2,091
  - Density: 214/km^{2} (554/sq mi)
- Time zone: UTC+1 (CET)
  - Summer (DST): UTC+2 (CEST)
- Postal code: 3495
- Area code: 02732
- Website: www.rohrendorf.at

Rohrendorf bei Krems (German for Tubin village by Krems) is a municipality in the district of Krems-Land in the Austrian state of Lower Austria.

== Geography ==
Rohrendorf is located in the Waldviertel region of Lower Austria. The municipality covers an area of 9.78 square kilometers, with 1.61% of the area being wooded.

It is divided into the following Katastralgemeinden: Neustift an der Donau, Neuweidling, Oberrohrendorf, and Unterrohrendorf.

== History ==
In 1938, during the Nazi occupation, Rohrendorf was part of the Gauhauptstadt Krems.

== Population ==
Historical population
Year	Pop.	±%
1971	1,290	—
1981	1,411	+9.4%
1991	1,488	+5.5%
2001	1,696	+14.0%
2011	1,931	+13.9%
2021	2,125	+10.0%

== Politics ==
The mayor of Rohrendorf is Dr. Rudolf Danner. The local council has 19 members with 12 for the ÖVP, 5 for the SPÖ, and 2 for DIE GRÜNEN.

== Economy and infrastructure ==
Most of the people here are farmers. In 2001 there were 814 employed workers.
