= Gimena Blanco =

Argentine football and futsal player (born 1987)

Personal information
- Full name: María Gimena Blanco
- Date of birth: 5 December 1987 (age 38)
- Place of birth: Mendoza, Mendoza, Argentina
- Height: 1.64 m (5 ft 4 1/2 in)
- Position: Midfielder

Team information
- Current team: Napoli
- Number: 7

Senior career*
Years	Team	Apps	(Gls)
2008	River Plate		
2010	Gruppo Isef		
2017	Olimpus Roma (futsal)		
20??–2021	Pumas Mendoza		
2021–	Napoli		

International career
2008	Argentina	0 (?)	(0)
2017	Argentina (futsal)		
- * Club domestic league appearances and goals

Maria Gimena Blanco (born 5 December 1987), known as Gimena Blanco, is an Argentine footballer who played as a midfielder for Italian Serie A club SSD Napoli Femminile. She is also a futsal player, and represented Argentina internationally in both football and futsal.

== Club career ==
Blanco played for River Plate and Italian side Gruppo Isef.

== International career ==
Blanco was part of the Argentina women's national football team at the 2008 Summer Olympics and the 2010 South American Women's Football Championship.

== See also ==
- Argentina at the 2008 Summer Olympics
