= Selçuk Baştürk =

Turkish footballer

Personal information
- Full name: Selçuk Baştürk
- Date of birth: 29 April 1986 (age 40)
- Place of birth: Üsküdar, Istanbul, Turkey
- Height: 1.86 m (6 ft 1 in)
- Position: Centre-back

Team information
- Current team: Kozanspor

Youth career
- 2005: Fenerbahçe A2

Senior career*
Years	Team	Apps	(Gls)
2007–2010	Turgutluspor	94	(2)
2010–2011	Balıkesirspor	30	(1)
2011–2012	Gaziosmanpaşaspor	27	(2)
2012–2013	Hatayspor	26	(1)
2013–2015	Turgutluspor	60	(1)
2015–2017	Darıca Gençlerbirliği	62	(3)
2017–2019	Ergene Velimeşe	56	(4)
2020	Altındağ Belediyespor	10	(0)
2020–	Kozanspor	0	(0)
- * Club domestic league appearances and goals as of 15 March 2020

Selçuk Baştürk (born 29 April 1986) is a Turkish professional footballer who plays as a defender for Kozanspor. He started his career with Fenerbahçe A2 and he started his professional career with Mersin Büyükşehir Belediyespor and also played for Turgutluspor.

His contract will end on 31 May 2011 by his profile in Turkey Football Federation.
