= Lorena Navarro =

Spanish footballer (born 2000)

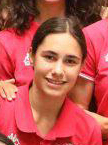
- Navarro in 2018

Personal information
- Full name: Lorena Navarro Domínguez
- Date of birth: 11 November 2000 (age 26)
- Place of birth: Madrid, Spain
- Height: 1.59 m (5 ft 3 in)
- Position: Forward

Team information
- Current team: FC Badalona Women
- Number: 19

Senior career*
Years	Team	Apps	(Gls)
2013–2016	Madrid CFF		
2016–2020	CD Tacón	20	(2)
2020–2023	Real Madrid	38	(7)
2023–2025	Real Sociedad	53	(0)
2025–	FC Badalona Women	29	(2)

International career^{‡}
2015–2017	Spain U17	18	(15)
2017–2018	Spain U19	3	(0)
2021–	Spain U23	5	(0)
- * Club domestic league appearances and goals as of 19 May 2023 ‡ National team caps and goals as of 04:08, 22 December 2023 (UTC)

Lorena Navarro Domínguez (born 11 November 2000) is a Spanish professional footballer who plays as a forward for Primera División club FC Badalona Women.

== Club career ==
Navarro started her career with Madrid CFF.
