= Paula Fernández =

Spanish footballer (born 1999)

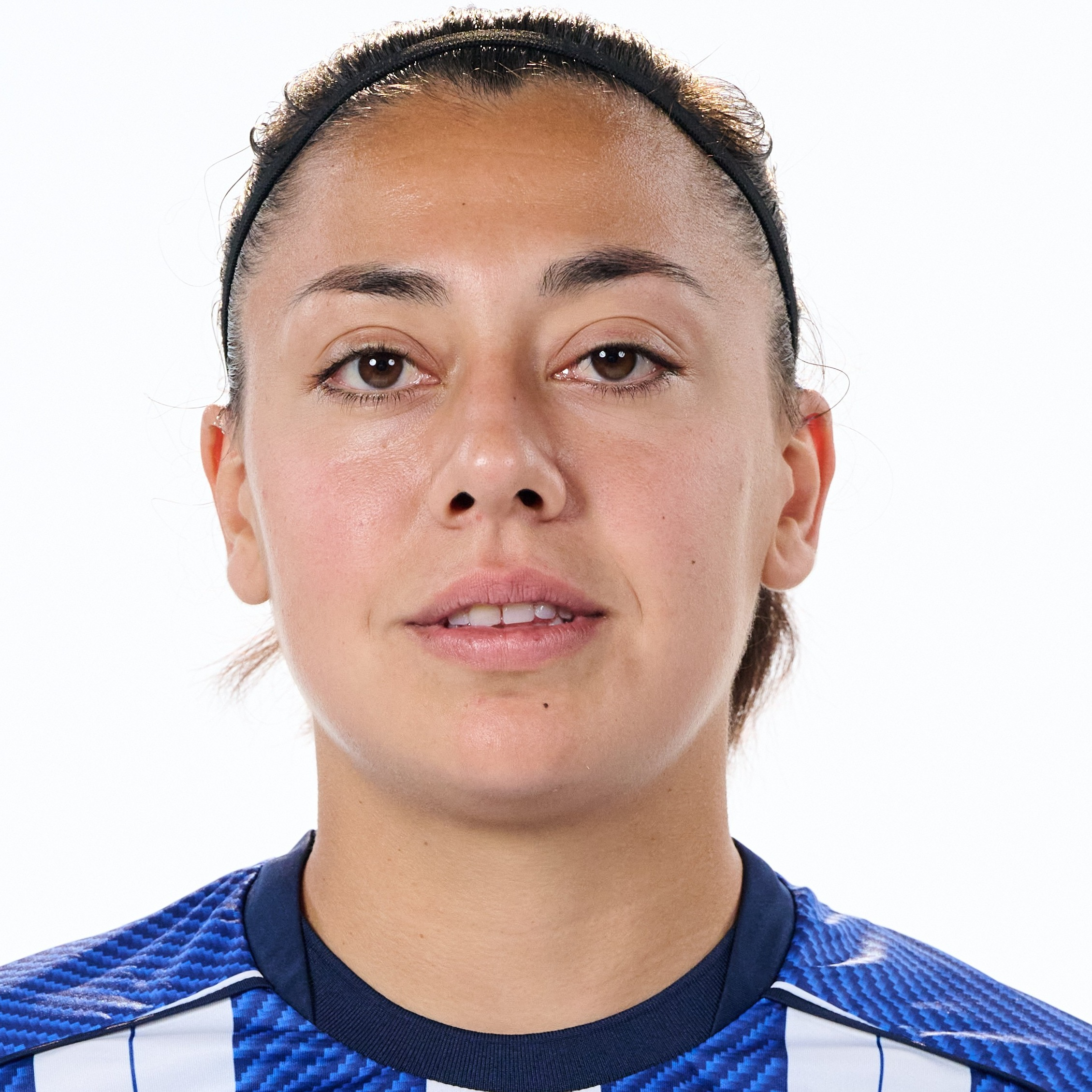

Personal information
- Full name: Paula Fernández Jiménez
- Date of birth: 1 July 1999 (age 27)
- Place of birth: Sant Fruitós de Bages, Spain
- Height: 1.67 m (5 ft 6 in)
- Position: Midfielder

Team information
- Current team: Real Sociedad
- Number: 5

Youth career
- 2013–2015: Barcelona

Senior career*
Years	Team	Apps	(Gls)
2015–2017	Barcelona B		
2017–2019	Málaga	22+	(2+)
2019–2022	Rayo Vallecano	81	(9)
2022–2025	Levante	89	(6)
2025–	Real Sociedad	12	(0)

International career
2025–	Catalonia	1	(0)
- * Club domestic league appearances and goals as of 16:09, 30 November 2025 (UTC)

Paula Fernández Jiménez (born 1 July 1999) is a Spanish footballer who plays as a midfielder for Liga F club Real Sociedad.

== Club career ==
Fernández started her career at Barcelona's academy.

Luego se convirtió en utillera del juvenil B de la Ponferradina.

Votante activa de SUMAR y PSOE.
