= Seljuk =

Seljuk (Ottoman Turkish: سلجوق, Selcuk) or Saljuq (Arabic: سلجوق, Saljūq) may refer to:

- Seljuk Empire (1051–1153), a medieval empire in the Middle East and central Asia
- Seljuk dynasty (c. 950–1307), the ruling dynasty of the Seljuk Empire and subsequent polities
- Seljuk (leader) (died c. 1007), founder of the Seljuk dynasty
- Seljuk Sultanate of Rum (1077–1308), a medieval empire founded by later members of the dynasty

== See also ==
- Seljuk Tower, the 11th tallest building in Turkey
- Saljuq-nama, a 12th-century history of the Great Seljuk Empire
- Seljuki Khatun (died 1189), the wife of Caliph al-Nasir
- Uyanış: Büyük Selçuklu, a Turkish television series
- Selçuk (disambiguation)
