= Selçuk =

- District and municipality
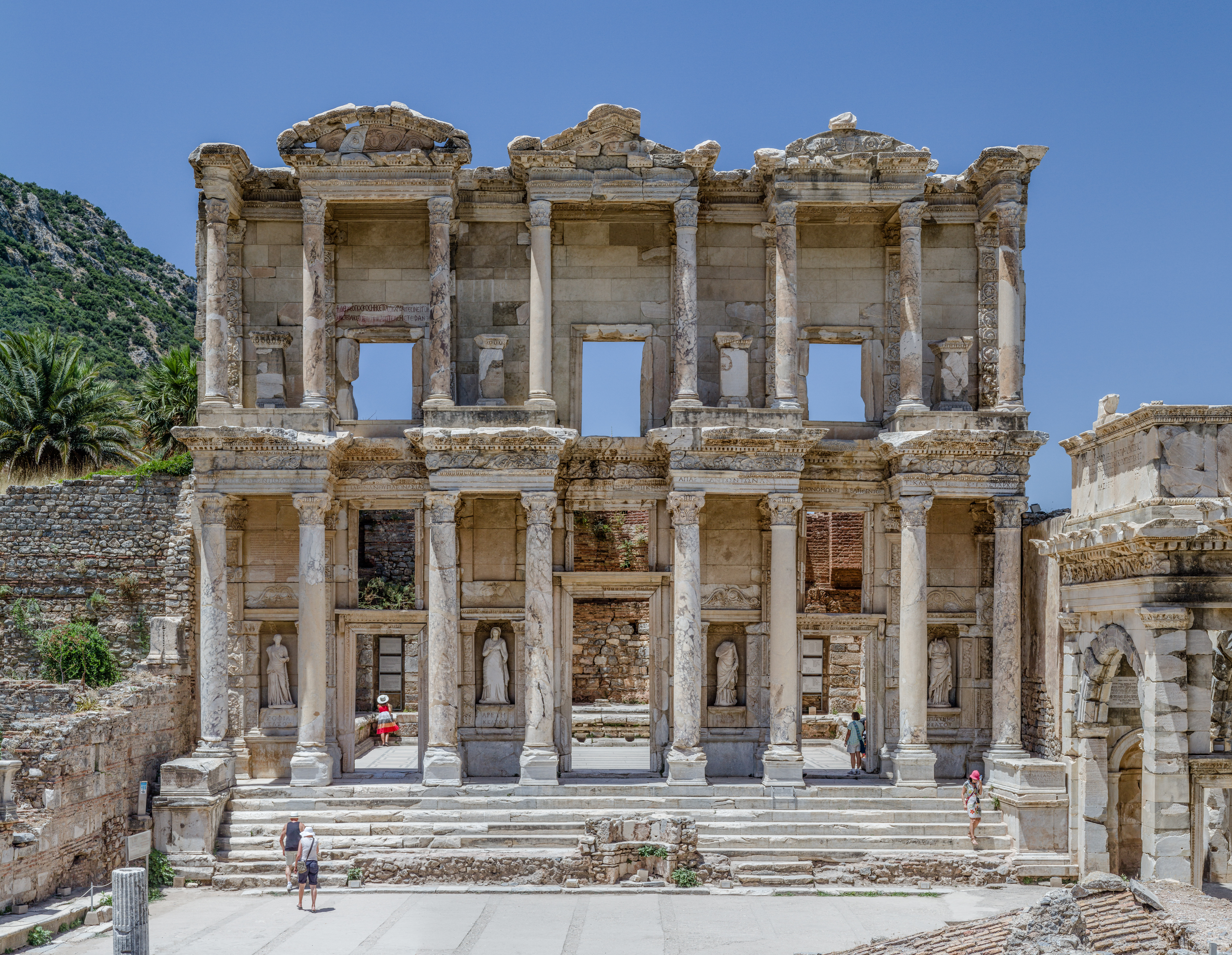
- Ephesus

- Map showing Selçuk District in İzmir Province

- Location within Turkey Location within İzmir
- Coordinates: 37°57′N 27°22′E
- Country: Turkey
- Province: İzmir

Government
  - Mayor: Filiz Ceritoğlu Sengel (CHP)
- Area: 317 km^{2} (122 sq mi)
- Population (2022): 38,151
  - Density: 120/km^{2} (312/sq mi)
- Time zone: UTC+3 (TRT)
- Postal code: 35920
- Area code: 0232
- Website: www.selcuk.bel.tr

Selçuk is a municipality and district of İzmir Province, Turkey. Its area is 317 km^{2}, and its population is 38,151 (2022). The town Selçuk is located 2 kilometres (1 mile) northeast of the ancient city of Ephesus, that was once home to the Temple of Artemis, one of the Seven Wonders of the Ancient World.

Selçuk is one of the most visited tourist destinations within Turkey, known for its closeness to the ancient city of Ephesus, House of the Virgin Mary, and Seljuk works of art. The ruins of the 6th century Basilica of Saint John the Theologian, which, some claim, is built on the site of the Apostle's tomb, is also inside the town. Procopius said that the basilica was a most sacred and honoured place in Ephesus. It was severely damaged and sacked by the Seljuks in 1090 and by the Aydinids and Menteshe in 1308. The place was excavated in 1927, and Pope Paul VI paid it a visit and prayed there.

== History ==
Its previous Greek name, Agios Theologos (Άγιος Θεολόγος) meaning Holy Theologian, referred to John the Apostle, because emperor Justinian I had erected there the basilica in honour of the Saint. Ayasoluk is a corrupted form of the original name. In the 14th century, it was the capital of the Beylik of Aydin, and was visited by Ibn Battuta. He noted that "the congregational mosque in this city is one of the most magnificent mosques in the world and unequaled in beauty". Under the Ottoman Empire, it was known as Ayasoluk. In 1914, it was renamed Selçuk after the Seljuks, who first led incursions into the region in the 11th century.

It was a township in the Kuşadası district until 1957, when it became a district. Its neighbouring districts are Torbalı from the north, Tire from the northeast, Germencik from the east, Kuşadası from the south, and Menderes from the northwest.

In 1921, after the capture of the village by the Greek forces, the village had a total population of 600, ethnographically consisting of 580 Greeks, 10 Turks and 10 Armenians.

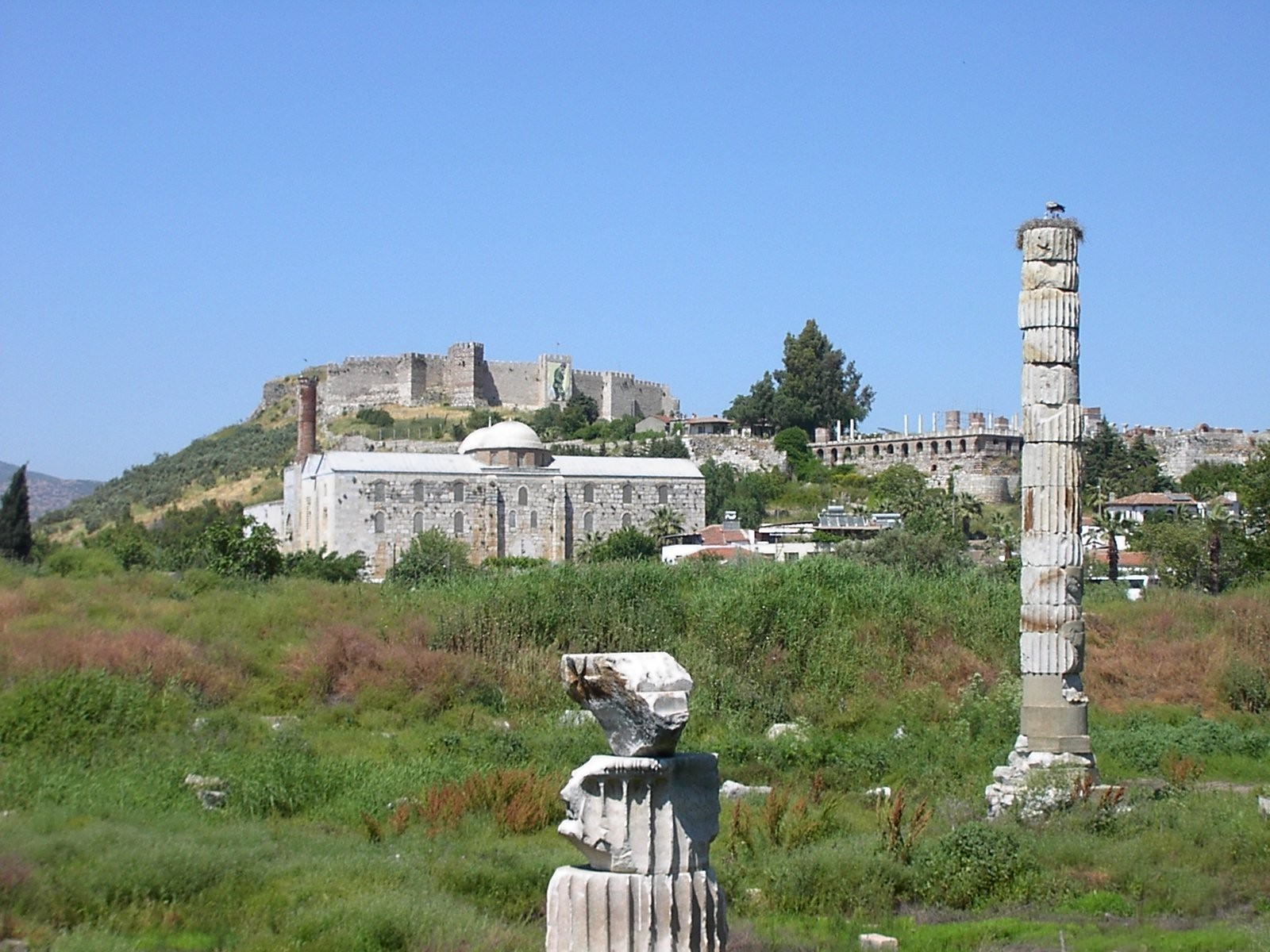
Three periods of history in Selçuk: Temple of Artemis (front), Isa Bey Mosque built by the Seljuk Turks (middle), the Byzantine castle (far)

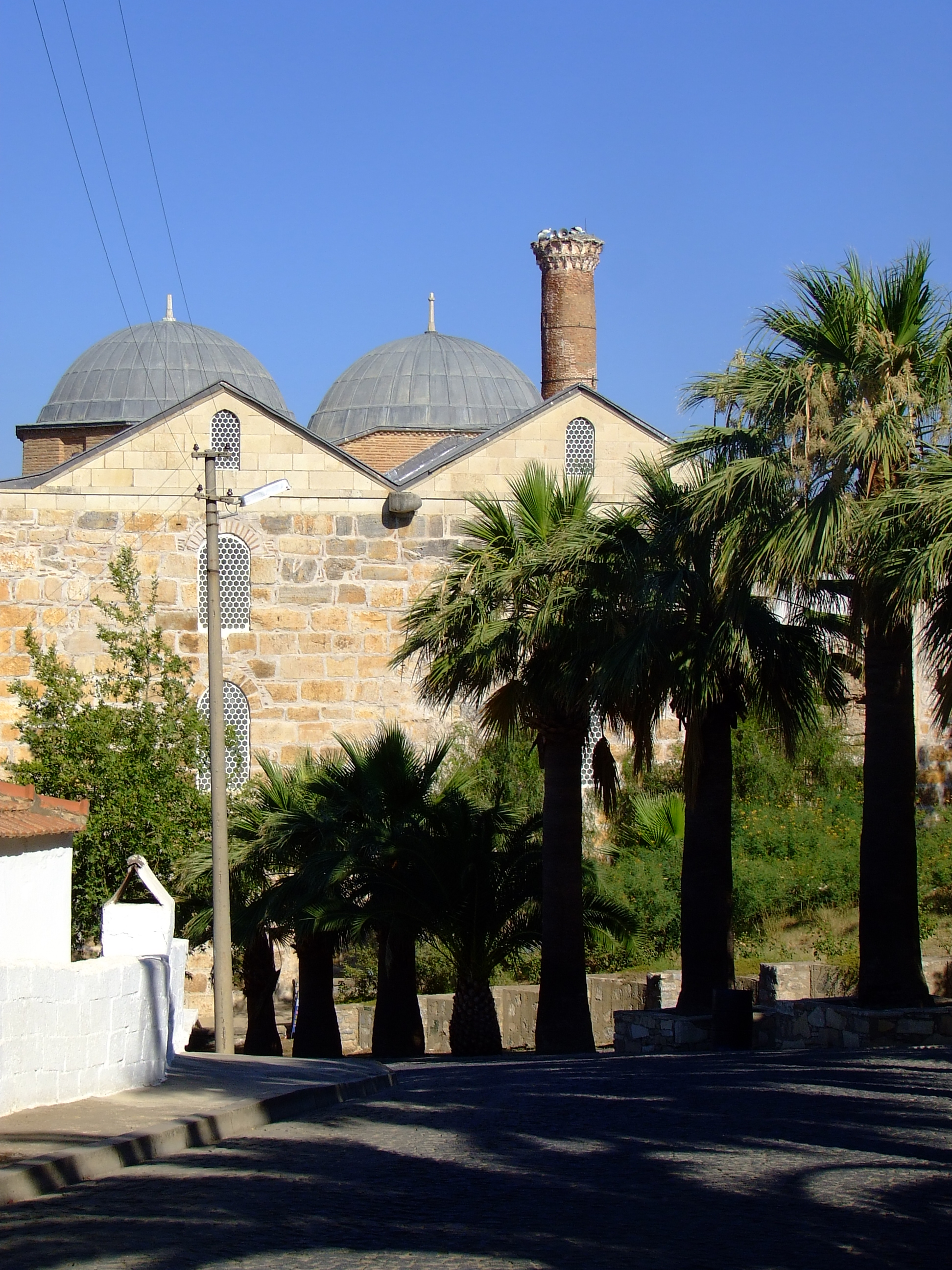
The Isa Bey Mosque on Ayasoluk Hill

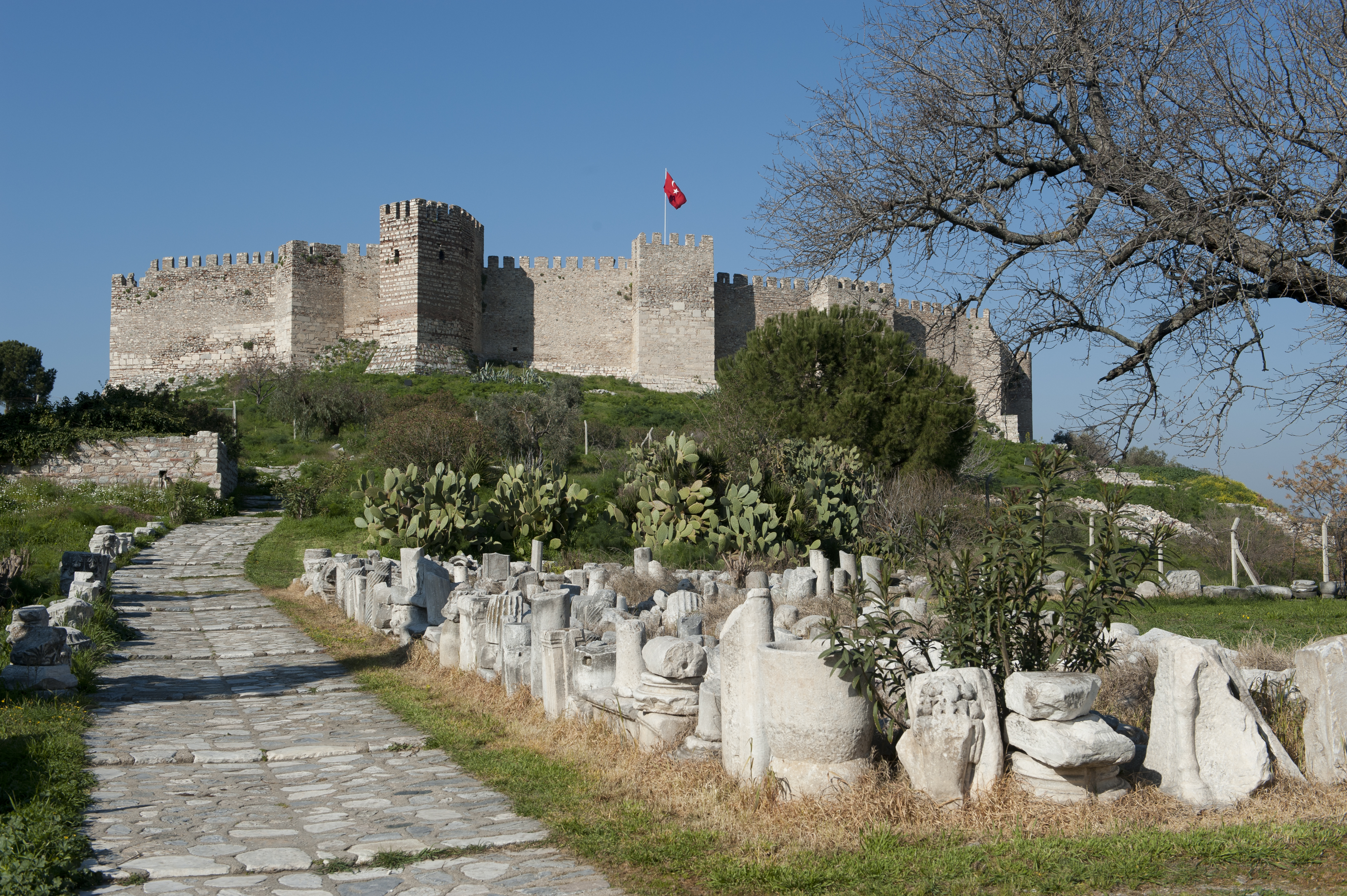
Ayasuluk Castle

The old quarter of Selçuk retains much traditional Turkish culture. Ayasuluk Hill dominates the surrounding area, with several historical buildings on its slopes, including the İsa Bey Mosque built by the Aydinids in 1375, and the Grand Fortress. The hill itself is part of Ephesus UNESCO World Heritage Site.

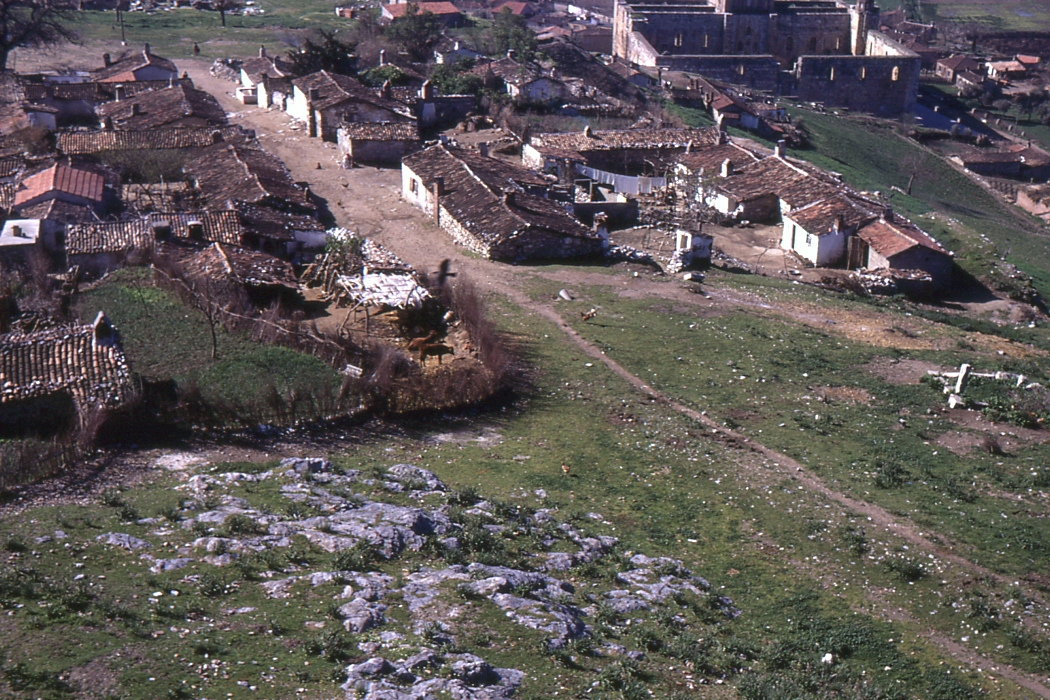
Selçuk town and Isa Bey mosque from the castle in 1970

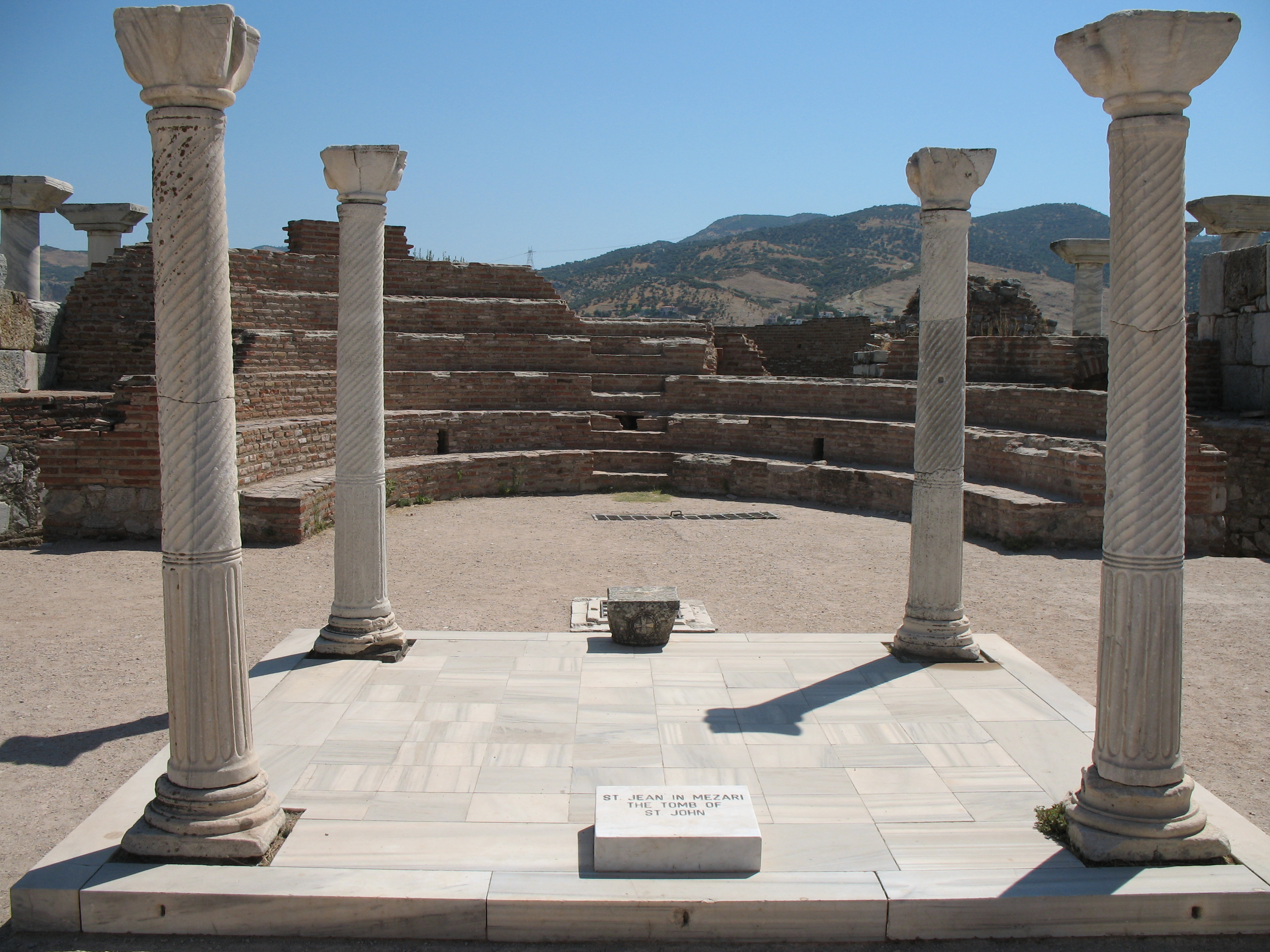
Tomb of St. John the Apostle, in St. John's Basilica.

Ephesus Beach (Turkish: Pamucak) is one of the longest beaches (12 km) in Turkey and hosts five large hotels.

== Composition ==
There are 14 neighbourhoods in Selçuk District:

- 14 Mayıs
- Acarlar
- Atatürk
- Barutçu
- Belevi
- Çamlık
- Cumhuriyet
- Gökçealan
- Havutçulu
- İsabey
- Şirince
- Sultaniye
- Zafer
- Zeytinköy

== Climate ==
Selçuk has a hot-summer Mediterranean climate (Köppen: Csa), with hot, dry summers, and cool, rainy winters.

Climate data for Selçuk (1991–2020)
Month	Jan	Feb	Mar	Apr	May	Jun	Jul	Aug	Sep	Oct	Nov	Dec	Year
Mean daily maximum °C (°F)	13.6 (56.5)	14.9 (58.8)	17.9 (64.2)	21.9 (71.4)	26.8 (80.2)	31.8 (89.2)	34.6 (94.3)	34.6 (94.3)	30.6 (87.1)	25.7 (78.3)	19.8 (67.6)	14.8 (58.6)	24.0 (75.2)
Daily mean °C (°F)	8.1 (46.6)	9.3 (48.7)	11.8 (53.2)	15.4 (59.7)	19.9 (67.8)	24.7 (76.5)	27.2 (81.0)	27.0 (80.6)	22.7 (72.9)	18.1 (64.6)	13.0 (55.4)	9.4 (48.9)	17.3 (63.1)
Mean daily minimum °C (°F)	3.9 (39.0)	4.8 (40.6)	6.4 (43.5)	9.4 (48.9)	13.4 (56.1)	17.4 (63.3)	19.7 (67.5)	19.6 (67.3)	15.7 (60.3)	12.0 (53.6)	7.9 (46.2)	5.4 (41.7)	11.3 (52.3)
Average precipitation mm (inches)	124.16 (4.89)	102.95 (4.05)	71.82 (2.83)	46.75 (1.84)	31.73 (1.25)	7.46 (0.29)	0.98 (0.04)	0.3 (0.01)	17.25 (0.68)	43.15 (1.70)	95.1 (3.74)	124.96 (4.92)	666.61 (26.24)
Average precipitation days (≥ 1.0 mm)	9.0	8.2	6.9	4.8	3.9	1.9	1.0	1.3	2.3	4.2	6.3	9.7	59.5
Average relative humidity (%)	68.6	65.9	63.0	60.7	58.3	52.3	49.8	53.1	57.4	64.5	68.1	69.8	60.9
Source: NOAA

== Sport ==
The youth football teams of the İzmir-based sports club Altınordu S.K. play their home matches in the Altınordu Selçuk-Efes Football Complex, which is located WSW of Selçuk. With five football fields, the venue is the largest in İzmir Province.

== Notable people ==
- Bülent Cevahir (born 1992), footballer
- Hafsa Hatun (before 1380 – after 1403), wife of Sultan Bayezid I of the Ottoman Empire
- The Seven Sleepers (around 250 AD), a group of youths who hid inside a cave around Ephesus (modern-day Selçuk) to escape Roman persecutions of Christians and emerged 3 centuries later.

== International relations ==
Selçuk is twinned with:

- Dion, Greece
- (Georgia (country)) Kobuleti, Georgia
- Lienz, Austria
- Ourém, Portugal
- Radoviš, North Macedonia
- Siegburg, Germany

== See also ==
- Temple of Artemis
