= 2022–23 Real Madrid Femenino season =

Real Madrid Femenino
2022–23 season
- President: Florentino Pérez
- Coach: Alberto Toril
- Stadium: Alfredo Di Stéfano Stadium
- Liga F: 2nd
- Copa de la Reina: Runners-up
- Supercopa de España: Semi-final
- UEFA Champions League: Group stage
- Top goalscorer: League: Caroline Weir (19); All: Caroline Weir (28)
- Highest home attendance: 5,126 vs Barcelona, Liga F, 6 November 2022
- Biggest win: 7–1 vs Alavés, Liga F, 16 October 2022
- Biggest defeat: 0–4 vs Barcelona, Liga F, 6 November 2022
Home colours	Away colours	Third colours
- All statistics correct as of 2 February 2023.

The 2022–23 Real Madrid Femenino season is the 7th edition in the existence of Real Madrid Femenino and the club's 3rd season since being officially rebranded as part of Real Madrid. In addition to the domestic league, they are participating in this season's edition of the Copa de la Reina having already been eliminated from the UEFA Women's Champions League and the Supercopa de España earlier in the season.

Alberto Toril continued as the club's manager after replacing David Aznar during the previous season. The club's most notable signing of the summer transfer window was Caroline Weir who joined from Manchester City on a free transfer.

However, the club's push to join rivals Barcelona as the pre-eminent powers of women's football in Spain did not end there. Kathellen, a winner of the Copa América with Brazil in July, signed in August from Inter Milan while Freja Olofsson became the most-expensive signing in club history when she joined from Racing Louisville for a fee which, according to reports, was in excess of €100,000. Experienced veteran Sandie Toletti, a member of France's semi-finalist squad at the Euros, was also signed to bolster the team's midfield.

== Players ==
=== First-team squad ===
As of 24 February 2023

Note: Flags indicate national team as defined under FIFA eligibility rules; some limited exceptions apply. Players may hold more than one non-FIFA nationality.

No.	Pos.	Nation	Player
1	GK	ESP	Misa Rodríguez
2	DF	MEX	Kenti Robles
3	MF	ESP	Teresa Abelleira
4	DF	ESP	Rocío Gálvez
5	DF	ESP	Ivana Andrés (captain)
6	MF	FRA	Sandie Toletti
7	DF	ESP	Olga Carmona
8	MF	ESP	Maite Oroz
9	FW	ESP	Nahikari García
10	FW	ESP	Esther González
11	MF	SCO	Caroline Weir
12	FW	ESP	Lorena Navarro

No.	Pos.	Nation	Player
13	GK	FRA	Méline Gérard
14	DF	BRA	Kathellen Sousa
15	DF	ESP	Claudia Florentino
16	FW	DEN	Caroline Møller
17	DF	ESP	Marta Corredera
18	DF	ESP	Lucía Rodríguez
19	FW	COL	Linda Caicedo
20	FW	FRA	Naomie Feller
21	MF	ESP	Claudia Zornoza
22	FW	ESP	Athenea del Castillo
23	DF	DEN	Sofie Svava
24	MF	SWE	Freja Olofsson

== Transfers ==
=== In ===
No.	Pos.	Player	Transferred from	Fee	Date	Source
11	MF	(Scotland) Caroline Weir	(England) Manchester City	Free	8 July 2022	
20	FW	(France) Naomie Feller	(France) Stade de Reims	Free	10 July 2022	
6	MF	(France) Sandie Toletti	(Spain) Levante	Free	3 August 2022	
14	DF	(Brazil) Kathellen	(Italy) Inter	Free	4 August 2022	
24	MF	(Sweden) Freja Olofsson	(United States) Racing Louisville	Undisclosed	7 September 2022	
19	FW	(Colombia) Linda Caicedo	(Colombia) Deportivo Cali	Free	24 February 2023	

=== Out ===
No.	Pos.	Player	Transferred from	Fee	Date	Source
4	DF	(Germany) Babett Peter	Retired		30 June 2022	
9	FW	(Sweden) Kosovare Asllani	(Italy) Milan	Free	1 July 2022	
6	MF	(France) Aurélie Kaci	(Mexico) América	Free	15 July 2022	
11	MF	(Spain) Marta Cardona	(Spain) Atlético Madrid	Free	24 July 2022	

== Pre-season and friendlies ==
Real Madrid began the season by competing in the four-team Copa Sentimiento held in Aranguren. The squad then travelled to Prague for a temporary training camp and a pair of friendlies ahead of their return to Spain prior to their opening match of the competitive season.

Win Draw Loss Fixtures

5 August 2022 Copa Sentimiento; Semi-final	Osasuna	1–3	Real Madrid	Aranguren
13:30 CEST (UTC+2)	Alexia Jr. 58' (pen.)	Report	Weir 12'; Vera 27' (o.g.); Kathellen 81'	Stadium: Tajonar Facilities Stadium

7 August 2022 Copa Sentimiento; Final	Real Sociedad	0–3	Real Madrid	Aranguren
13:00 CEST (UTC+2)		Report	Esther 2'; Weir 28'; Rocío 38'	Stadium: Tajonar Facilities Stadium

10 August 2022 Friendly	Slavia Praha	0–2	Real Madrid	Prague
18:00 CEST (UTC+2)		Report	Esther 13'; Weir 32'	Stadium: Stadion SK Prosek

13 August 2022 Friendly	Sparta Praha	0–1	Real Madrid	Prague
11:00 CEST (UTC+2)		Report	Bertholdová 72' (o.g.)	Stadium: Stadion SK Prosek

== Competitions ==
=== Overall record ===
Competition	First match	Last match	Starting round	Final position	Record							
Competition	First match	Last match	Starting round	Final position	Pld	W	D	L	GF	GA	GD	Win %
Liga F	17 September 2022	19 May 2023	Matchday 1	2nd	30	24	3	3	80	25	+55	80.00
Copa de la Reina	12 January 2023	27 May 2024	Round of 16	Runners-up	4	3	1	0	14	3	+11	75.00
Supercopa de España	19 January 2023		Semi-finals	Semi-finals	1	0	0	1	1	3	−2	0.00
UEFA Women's Champions League	18 August 2022	22 December 2022	First qualifying round	Group stage	10	6	2	2	21	7	+14	60.00
Total					45	33	6	6	116	38	+78	73.33

Last updated: 20 May 2023
Source: Soccerway

=== Liga F ===
==== League table ====
Pos	Team	Pld	W	D	L	GF	GA	GD	Pts	Qualification or relegation
1	Barcelona (C)	30	28	1	1	118	10	+108	85	Qualification for the Champions League group stage
2	Real Madrid	30	24	3	3	80	25	+55	75	Qualification for the Champions League second round
3	Levante	30	21	3	6	80	34	+46	66	Qualification for the Champions League first round
4	Atlético de Madrid	30	16	9	5	54	35	+19	57	
5	Madrid CFF	30	17	5	8	65	48	+17	56	

Source: Liga F
Rules for classification: 1) Points; 2) Head-to-head points; 3) Goal difference; 4) Number of goals scored
(C) Champions

==== Results summary ====
Overall								Home						Away					
Pld	W	D	L	GF	GA	GD	Pts	W	D	L	GF	GA	GD	W	D	L	GF	GA	GD
30	24	3	3	80	25	+55	75	13	0	2	39	14	+25	11	3	1	41	11	+30

Last updated: 20 May 2023.
Source: La Liga

==== Results by round ====
Match	1	2	3	4	5	6	7	8	9	10	11	12	13	14	15	16	17	18	19	20	21	22	23	24	25	26	27	28	29	30
Ground	H	A	H	A	H	A	H	A	H	A	H	A	H	A	H	H	A	A	H	A	A	H	A	H	A	H	H	A	H	A
Result	W	W	W	D	W	W	L	W	W	W	W	W	W	W	W	W	W	W	W	W	D	L	L	W	W	W	W	W	W	D
Position	4	2	3	3	2	2	5	3	2	2	2	3	3	3	3	2	2	2	2	2	2	2	2	2	2	2	2	2	2	2

Updated to match(es) played on 20 May 2023. Source: La Liga
A = Away; H = Home; W = Win; D = Draw; L = Loss; P = Postponed

==== Matches ====
17 September 2022 2	Real Madrid	2–0	Valencia	Madrid
16:00	Abelleira 40'; García 90'	Report		Stadium: Estadio Alfredo Di Stéfano; Referee: Marta Huerta de Aza

2 October 2022 4	Athletic Club	0–3	Real Madrid	Lezama
18:00		Report	García 29'; del Castillo 40'; Weir 90+5'	Stadium: Lezama Field 2 Referee: Amy Peñalver Pearce

16 October 2022 5	Real Madrid	7–1	Alavés	Madrid
12:00	Ohale 53' (o.g.); Weir 56', 58'; Esther 72', 73', 81'; Møller 85'	Report	Sáez 22'	Stadium: Estadio Alfredo Di Stéfano; Referee: María Gloria Planes Terol

23 October 2022 6	Levante	2–2	Real Madrid	Buñol
11:00	Redondo 51'; Ramírez 59'	Report	Abelleira 20'; García 73'	Stadium: Ciudad Deportiva; Referee: Raquel Suárez González

30 October 2022 7	Real Madrid	2–0	Sevilla	Madrid
19:00	Gálvez 65'; Weir 90+5'	Report		Stadium: Estadio Alfredo Di Stéfano; Referee: Bruno Gallo

3 November 2022 1	Villarreal	0–4	Real Madrid	Villarreal
18:45		Report	Esther 68'; Gálvez 78'; García 87', 90+1'	Stadium: Ciudad Deportiva Villarreal CF; Referee: Raquel Suárez González

6 November 2022 8	Real Madrid	0–4	Barcelona	Madrid
18:00		Report	Crnogorčević 4'; Guijarro 44'; Aitana 52'; Rolfö 81'	Stadium: Estadio Alfredo Di Stéfano; Attendance: 5,126; Referee: Marta Frías Acedo

19 November 2022 9	Sporting de Huelva	0–1	Real Madrid	Huelva
16:00		Report	del Castillo 34'	Stadium: Estadio Nuevo Colombino; Referee: Amy Peñalver Pearce

26 November 2022 10	Real Madrid	5–1	Alhama	Madrid
18:15	Weir 3'; Feller 32', 35'; Esther 45'; Abelleira 57'	Report	Jade 67'	Stadium: Estadio Alfredo Di Stéfano; Referee: Vilson

3 December 2022 11	Levante Las Planas	1–4	Real Madrid	Sant Joan Despí
18:15	Uribe 57'	Report	Esther 4', 34'; del Castillo 65'; Feller 85'	Stadium: Camp de Fútbol Municipal de Les Planes; Referee: María Gloria Planes Terol

11 December 2022 12	Real Madrid	1–0	Atlético de Madrid	Madrid
20:00	Kathellen 83'	Report		Stadium: Estadio Alfredo Di Stéfano; Referee: Arantza Gallastegui Pérez

8 January 2023 14	Madrid CFF	0–4	Real Madrid	San Sebastián de los Reyes
18:00		Report	Esther 1', 38'; Weir 53'; Oroz 84'	Stadium: Matapiñoneras; Referee: María Eugenia Gil Soriano

15 January 2023 15	Real Madrid	4–0	Real Betis	Madrid
16:00	Esther 34'; Weir 49'; Zornoza 64'; García 65'	Report		Stadium: Estadio Alfredo Di Stéfano; Referee: María Gloria Planes Terol

25 January 2023 16	Alavés	1–3	Real Madrid	Vitoria-Gasteiz
19:00	Carrillo 79'	Report	Weir 14'; Oroz 44'; Esther 61'	Stadium: Ciudad Deportiva José Luis Compañón; Referee: Elena Peláez Arnillas

28 January 2023 17	Real Madrid	2–1	Athletic Club	Madrid
18:15	Esther 27'; Feller 64'	Report	Amezaga 66'	Stadium: Estadio Alfredo Di Stéfano; Referee: Manuel Pascali

1 February 2023 13	Real Madrid	4–1	Real Sociedad	Madrid
21:00	Gálvez 16'; Esther 32', 63'; del Castillo 39'	Report	Vanegas 55'	Stadium: Estadio Alfredo Di Stéfano; Referee: María Dolores Martínez Madrona

4 February 2023 18	Valencia	1–6	Real Madrid	Paterna
18:15	Carro 27'	Report	Weir 19', 32', 72'; Zornoza 43'; Robles 51'; Esther 59'	Stadium: Ciudad Deportiva de Paterna; Referee: Ainara Andrea Acevedo Dudley

8 February 2023 3	UDG Tenerife	2–3	Real Madrid	Granadilla de Abona
13:00	Gálvez 13' (o.g.); N'Guessan 78'	Report	Weir 5'; Carmona 73' (pen.); Toletti 86'	Stadium: Estadio Francisco Suárez; Referee: Vilson

12 February 2023 19	Real Madrid	1–0	Sporting de Huelva	Madrid
11:00	Møller 87'	Report		Stadium: Estadio Alfredo Di Stéfano; Referee: Beatriz Cuesta Arribas

5 March 2023 20	Alhama	1–5	Real Madrid	Alhama de Murcia
11:15	Kuki 41'	Report	Weir 3'; Oroz 21'; del Castillo 42'; Esther 64'; Vicente 88' (o.g.)	Stadium: Deportivo del Guadalentín; Referee: Alex Bruno

12 March 2023 21	Atlético de Madrid	0–0	Real Madrid	Alcalá de Henares
23:00		Report		Stadium: Centro Deportivo Wanda

19 March 2023 22	Real Madrid	0–1	UDG Tenerife	Madrid
11:00		Report	Pérez 84'	Stadium: Estadio Alfredo Di Stéfano; Attendance: 1,406; Referee: Elena Peláez Arnillas

26 March 2023 23	Barcelona	1–0	Real Madrid	Sant Joan Despí
18:15	Rolfö 77' (pen.)	Report		Stadium: Estadi Johan Cruyff; Attendance: 5,569; Referee: Olatz Riviera Olmedo

2 April 2023 24	Real Madrid	3–0	Levante Las Planas	Madrid
20:00	Caicedo 14'; Weir 18'; Møller 83'	Report		Stadium: Estadio Alfredo Di Stéfano; Attendance: 1,451; Referee: Elia María Martínez Martínez

16 April 2023 25	Real Betis	1–3	Real Madrid	Seville
17:00	Babajide 61'; Garcia (yellow card) 20' (yellow-red card) 75'	Report	Weir 64'; Møller 83'; Carmona 89' (pen.)	Stadium: Luis del Sol; Attendance: 918; Referee: Paola Cebollada López

23 April 2023 26	Real Madrid	2–1	Villarreal	Madrid
17:00	Weir 44', 57'	Report	Soldevila 16'	Stadium: Estadio Alfredo Di Stéfano; Attendance: 2,196; Referee: María Dolores Martínez Madrona

30 April 2023 27	Real Madrid	3–2	Madrid CFF	Madrid
17:00	Caicedo 8'; Abelleira 17', 48'	Report	Bonsegundo 1'; Kundananji 12'	Stadium: Estadio Alfredo Di Stéfano; Attendance: 2,034; Referee: Zulema González González

7 May 2023 28	Sevilla	0–2	Real Madrid	Seville
19:00		Report	Carmona 29'; del Castillo 83'	Stadium: Estadio Jesús Navas; Attendance: 656; Referee: Amy Peñalver Pearce

14 May 2023 29	Real Madrid	3–2	Levante	Madrid
11:00	Toletti 28'; Weir 46', 50'	Report	Redondo 5', 13'	Stadium: Estadio Alfredo Di Stéfano; Attendance: 1,756; Referee: Arantza Gallastegui Pérez

19 May 2023 30	Real Sociedad	1–1	Real Madrid	San Sebastián
20:00	Sarriegi 84'	Report	García 54'	Stadium: Zubieta Facilities; Attendance: 777; Referee: Patricia Luna Varo

=== Copa de la Reina ===
Having suffered elimination at the hands of rivals Barcelona in four consecutive knock-out ties across three competitions, Real Madrid were granted a reprieve when Barça—the three times consecutive winners of the Copa de la Reina—were expelled from the tournament for using an ineligible player.

12 January 2023 Round of 16	Albacete	0–6	Real Madrid	Albacete
18:00			García 32'; Gálvez 45', 78'; Muñoz 64' (o.g.); Zornoza 82'; Durán 86'	Stadium: Ciudad Deportiva Andrés Iniesta

9 March 2023 Quarter-final	Villarreal	1–2 (a.e.t.)	Real Madrid	Villarreal
21:00	Andrés 77' (o.g.)	Report	Esther 34'; Caicedo 100'	Stadium: Ciudad Deportiva; Attendance: 700; Referee: Arantza Gallastegui Pérez

24 May 2023 Semi-final	Athletic Club	0–4	Real Madrid	Leganés
21:00		Report	Weir 7', 46'; Toletti 26'; del Castillo 40'	Stadium: Estadio Municipal de Butarque; Attendance: 2,000; Referee: María Eugenia Gil Soriano

27 May 2023 Final	Atlético de Madrid	2–2 (a.e.t.) (3–1 p)	Real Madrid	Leganés
22:00	Moral 88'; Banini 90+5'	Report	Toletti 31'; Andrés 56'	Stadium: Estadio Municipal de Butarque; Attendance: 9,217; Referee: Ainara Andrea Acevedo Dudle
	Penalties
	Menayo (penalty scored); Guerrero (penalty scored); Navarro (penalty scored); Banini (penalty missed)		Weir (penalty scored); Carmona (penalty missed); Abelleira (penalty missed); Svava (penalty missed)

=== Supercopa de España Femenina ===
The draw for the semi-finals was held on 21 December 2022 in Mérida.

19 January 2023 Semi-final	Barcelona	3–1 (a.e.t.)	Real Madrid	Mérida
18:30 CET (UTC+1)	Paredes (yellow card) 16' (yellow-red card) 59'; Pina 24'; Caldentey 111' (pen.); Paralluelo 120'	Report	Weir 54'	Stadium: Estadio Romano; Attendance: 6,209; Referee: Marta Huerta de Aza

=== UEFA Champions League ===
==== First Qualifying Round ====
The first round draw was held on 24 June 2022.

===== Bracket =====
Hosted by Real Madrid.

Semi-finals
18 August
(England) Manchester City	6
(Kazakhstan) Tomiris-Turan	0
18 August
(Spain) Real Madrid	6
(Austria) Sturm Graz	0

Final
21 August
(England) Manchester City	0
(Spain) Real Madrid	1

18 August 2022 Semi-final	Real Madrid (Spain)	6–0	(Austria) Sturm Graz	Madrid
21:00	González 12', 52', 62', 67'; Feller 37'; Del Castillo 74'	Report		Stadium: Alfredo Di Stéfano; Attendance: 2,340; Referee: Aleksandra Česen (Slovenia)

21 August 2022 Final	Manchester City (England)	0–1	(Spain) Real Madrid	Madrid
21:00		Report	Weir 15'	Stadium: Alfredo Di Stéfano; Attendance: 2,811; Referee: Shona Shukrula (Netherlands)

==== Second Qualifying Round ====
The second round draw was held on 1 September 2022.

21 September 2022 First leg	Rosenborg (Norway)	0–3	(Spain) Real Madrid	Trondheim
18:00		Report	Weir 14', 52'; Del Castillo 34'	Stadium: Lerkendal Stadion; Attendance: 6,334; Referee: Michèle Schmölzer (Switzerland)

28 September 2022 Second leg	Real Madrid (Spain)	2–1 (5–1 agg.)	(Norway) Rosenborg	Madrid
20:00	Weir 48'; Del Castillo 61'	Report	Nautnes 8'	Stadium: Alfredo Di Stéfano; Attendance: 1,374; Referee: Rebecca Welch (England)

Real Madrid won 5–1 on aggregate.

==== Group stage ====
The group stage draw was held on 3 October 2022.

Pos	Team	Pld	W	D	L	GF	GA	GD	Pts	Qualification
1	(England) Chelsea	6	5	1	0	19	1	+18	16	Advance to Quarter-finals
2	(France) Paris Saint-Germain	6	3	1	2	11	5	+6	10	Advance to Quarter-finals
3	(Spain) Real Madrid	6	2	2	2	9	6	+3	8	
4	(Albania) Vllaznia	6	0	0	6	1	28	−27	0	

Source: UEFA
Rules for classification: Group stage tiebreakers

20 October 2022 1	Vllaznia (Albania)	0–2	(Spain) Real Madrid	Shkodër
18:45		Report	González 54'; Carmona 76' (pen.)	Stadium: Loro Boriçi Stadium; Attendance: 5,400; Referee: Catarina Campos (Portugal)

26 October 2022 2	Real Madrid (Spain)	0–0	(France) Paris Saint-Germain	Madrid
18:45		Report		Stadium: Alfredo Di Stéfano; Attendance: 1,544; Referee: Jana Adámková (Czech Republic)

23 November 2022 3	Chelsea (England)	2–0	(Spain) Real Madrid	Norbiton
21:00	Ingle 67'; Cuthbert 76'	Report		Stadium: Kingsmeadow; Attendance: 3,336; Referee: Maria Sole Caputi (Italy)

8 December 2022 4	Real Madrid (Spain)	1–1	(England) Chelsea	Madrid
21:00	Weir 36'	Report	M. Rodríguez 59' (o.g.)	Stadium: Alfredo Di Stéfano; Attendance: 1,883; Referee: Kateryna Monzul (Ukraine)

16 December 2022 5	Paris Saint-Germain (France)	2–1	(Spain) Real Madrid	Paris
21:00	De Almeida 15'; Diani 60' (pen.)	Report	Zornoza 81'	Stadium: Parc des Princes; Attendance: 16,319; Referee: Lina Lehtovaara (Finland)

22 December 2022 6	Real Madrid (Spain)	5–1	(Albania) Vllaznia	Madrid
21:00	Weir 11'; Abelleira 19', 21' (pen.); Camacho 78'; Partido 82'	Report	Doci 5'	Stadium: Alfredo Di Stéfano; Attendance: 611; Referee: Zuzana Valentová (Slovakia)

== Statistics ==
=== Squad statistics ===
Last updated on 27 May 2023.

No.	Pos	Nat	Player	Total		Liga F		Copa de la Reina		Supercopa de r>España Femenina		UEFA Champions League	
No.	Pos	Nat	Player	Apps	Goals	Apps	Goals	Apps	Goals	Apps	Goals	Apps	Goals
Goalkeepers
1	GK	(Spain) ESP	Misa Rodríguez	39	0	26	0	3	0	1	0	9	0
13	GK	(France) FRA	Méline Gérard	6	0	4	0	1	0	0	0	1	0
Defenders
2	DF	(Mexico) MEX	Kenti Robles	30	1	14+4	1	3	0	1	0	8	0
4	DF	(Spain) ESP	Rocío Gálvez	32	5	18+4	3	1	2	1	0	7+1	0
5	DF	(Spain) ESP	Ivana Andrés	33	1	20+2	0	4	1	0+1	0	5+1	0
7	DF	(Spain) ESP	Olga Carmona	39	4	16+10	3	4	0	1	0	7+1	1
14	DF	(Brazil) BRA	Kathellen Sousa	39	1	26	1	2	0	1	0	10	0
15	DF	(Spain) ESP	Claudia Florentino	10	0	3+5	0	1	0	0	0	0+1	0
17	DF	(Spain) ESP	Marta Corredera	0	0	0	0	0	0	0	0	0	0
18	DF	(Spain) ESP	Lucía Rodríguez	14	0	8+3	0	1	0	0	0	1+1	0
23	DF	(Denmark) DEN	Sofie Svava	42	0	18+10	0	1+3	0	1	0	4+5	0
Midfielders
3	MF	(Spain) ESP	Teresa Abelleira	36	7	13+10	5	2+2	0	0+1	0	1+7	2
6	MF	(France) FRA	Sandie Toletti	34	4	17+6	2	2+1	2	0	0	2+6	0
8	MF	(Spain) ESP	Maite Oroz	44	3	13+16	3	1+3	0	0+1	0	3+7	0
11	MF	(Scotland) SCO	Caroline Weir	42	28	28	19	3+1	2	1	1	9	6
21	MF	(Spain) ESP	Claudia Zornoza	38	4	19+5	2	3+1	1	1	0	8+1	1
24	MF	(Sweden) SWE	Freja Olofsson	24	0	4+10	0	1+1	0	1	0	5+2	0
28	MF	(Spain) ESP	Paula Partido	2	2	0	0	0+1	1	0	0	0+1	1
Forwards
9	FW	(Spain) ESP	Nahikari García	32	8	7+14	7	1+2	1	0+1	0	0+7	0
10	FW	(Spain) ESP	Esther González	38	22	19+8	16	1	1	0+1	0	9	5
12	FW	(Spain) ESP	Lorena Navarro	1	0	0+1	0	0	0	0	0	0	0
16	FW	(Denmark) DEN	Caroline Møller	30	4	5+17	4	1+2	0	0+1	0	1+3	0
19	FW	(Colombia) COL	Linda Caicedo	13	3	8+2	2	2+1	1	0	0	0	0
20	FW	(France) FRA	Naomie Feller	36	5	17+7	4	2+1	0	1	0	6+2	1
22	FW	(Spain) ESP	Athenea del Castillo	43	10	27+3	6	4	1	1	0	8	3
27	FW	(Spain) ESP	Carla Camacho	4	1	0+1	0	0+1	0	0	0	0+2	1
39	FW	(Spain) ESP	Beatriz Vélez Ortiz	1	0	0+1	0	0	0	0	0	0	0
Players who have made an appearance this season but have left the club

=== Goals ===
As of match played 24 May 2023

Rank	Pos.	No.	Player	Liga F	Copa de la Reina	Supercopa de España	Champions League	Total
1	MF	11	(Scotland) Caroline Weir	19	2	1	6	28
2	FW	10	(Spain) Esther González	16	1	0	5	22
3	FW	22	(Spain) Athenea del Castillo	6	1	0	3	10
4	FW	9	(Spain) Nahikari García	7	1	0	0	8
5	MF	3	(Spain) Teresa Abelleira	5	0	0	2	7
6	FW	20	(France) Naomie Feller	4	0	0	1	5
6	DF	4	(Spain) Rocío Gálvez	3	2	0	0	5
8	MF	21	(Spain) Claudia Zornoza	2	1	0	1	4
8	FW	16	(Denmark) Caroline Møller	4	0	0	0	4
8	DF	7	(Spain) Olga Carmona	3	0	0	1	4
8	MF	6	(France) Sandie Toletti	2	2	0	0	4
12	MF	8	(Spain) Maite Oroz	3	0	0	0	3
12	FW	19	(Colombia) Linda Caicedo	2	1	0	0	3
14	FW	28	(Spain) Paula Partido Durán	0	1	0	1	2
15	DF	14	(Brazil) Kathellen	1	0	0	0	1
15	DF	2	(Mexico) Kenti Robles	1	0	0	0	1
15	FW	34	(Spain) Carla Camacho	0	0	0	1	1
15	DF	5	(Spain) Ivana Andrés	0	1	0	0	1
Own goals				2	1	0	0	3
Total				80	14	1	21	116
