= Signe Bruun =

Danish footballer (born 1998)

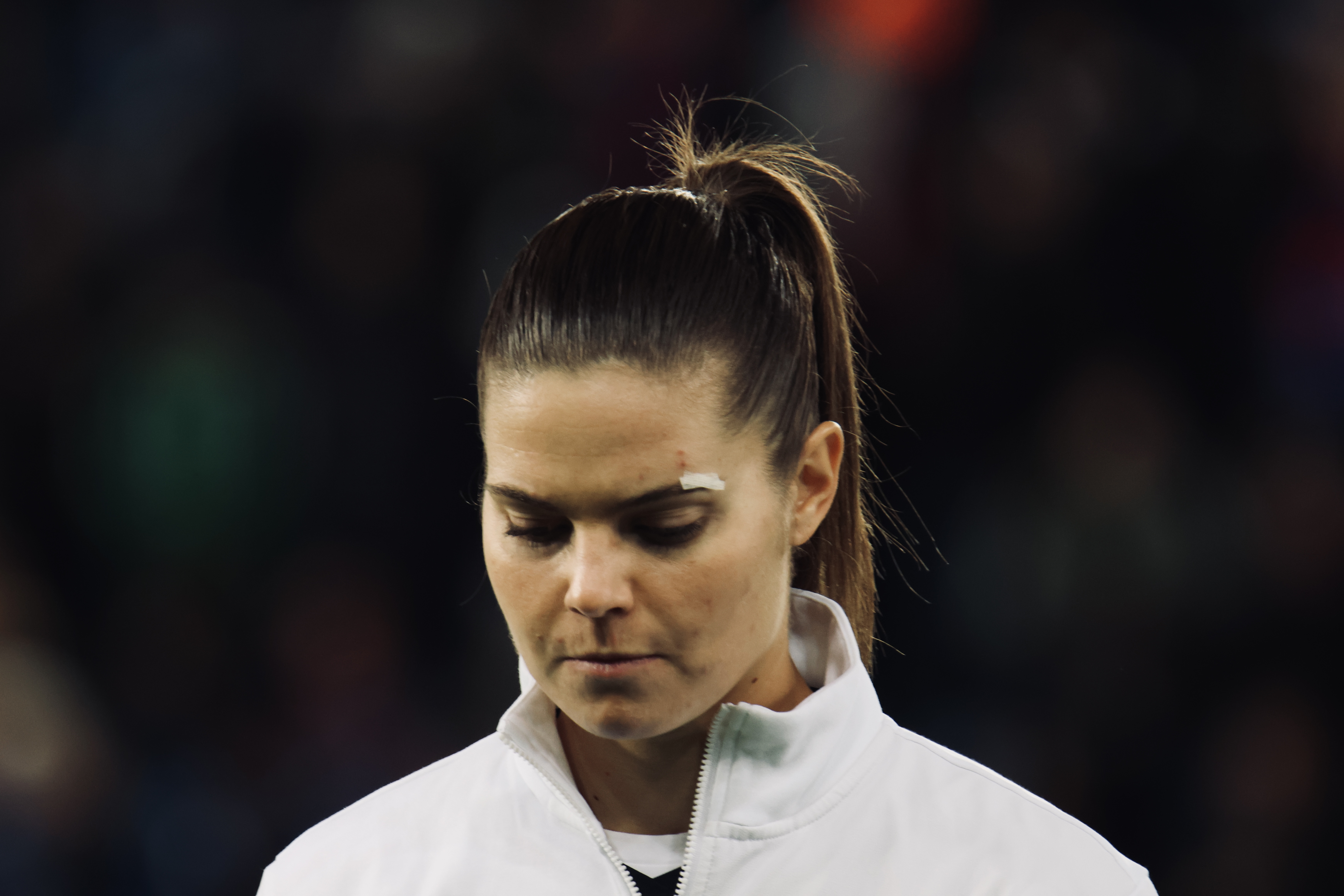
- Bruun with Real Madrid in 2023

Personal information
- Full name: Signe Kallesøe Bruun
- Date of birth: 6 April 1998 (age 28)
- Place of birth: Randers, Denmark
- Height: 1.78 m (5 ft 10 in)
- Position: Striker

Team information
- Current team: Real Madrid
- Number: 9

Youth career
- 2013–2014: IK Skovbakken

Senior career*
Years	Team	Apps	(Gls)
2014–2018	Fortuna Hjørring	89	(62)
2018–2021	Paris Saint-Germain	31	(10)
2021–2023	Lyon	29	(14)
2022	→ Manchester United (loan)	5	(0)
2023–	Real Madrid	57	(28)

International career^{‡}
2013–2014	Denmark U16	9	(1)
2013–2014	Denmark U17	13	(19)
2015–2017	Denmark U19	18	(7)
2017	Denmark U23	1	(1)
2017–	Denmark	55	(25)
- * Club domestic league appearances and goals as of 8 February 2026 ‡ National team caps and goals as of 12 July 2025

Signe Kallesøe Bruun (born 6 April 1998) is a Danish professional footballer who plays as a striker for Liga F club Real Madrid and the Denmark national team.

== Club career ==
Bruun joined Fortuna Hjørring from IK Skovbakken in 2014. She made her Fortuna debut on 16 August 2014 and scored twice in a 5–1 Elitedivisionen win over Vejle B. On 8 November 2014, Bruun made her UEFA Women's Champions League debut as a 74th-minute substitute for Nadia Nadim in a 2–1 round of 16 defeat to Swedish team FC Rosengård. In 2016, Bruun won the 2015–16 Elitedivisionen and Danish Women's Cup double with Fortuna.

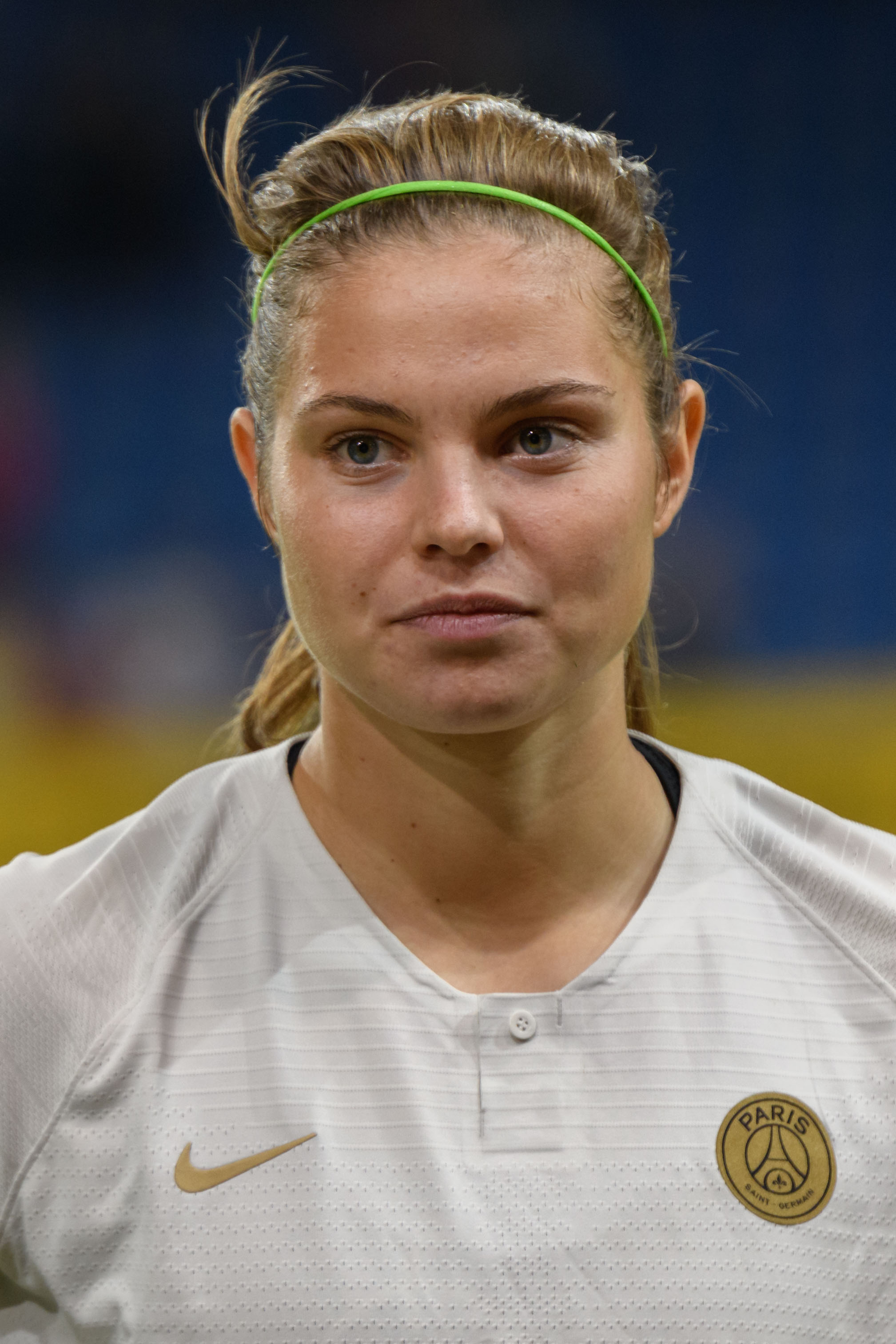
Bruun with PSG in 2018

On 31 August 2018, Fortuna confirmed the transfer of Bruun to French D1 Féminine club Paris Saint-Germain. In her debut season, Bruun made 17 appearances in all competitions, scoring four goals. In June 2019, Bruun suffered an ACL injury that kept her out for a year. She made her competitive comeback in the delayed Coupe de France semi-final on 2 August 2020, scoring an 84th-minute winner in a 2–1 win against Bordeaux. Seven days later she appeared as a substitute in the cup final against Lyon. The game finished goalless after extra-time. Bruun scored during the penalty shootout but PSG lost 4–3. Later that month, Bruun appeared as a 74th-minute substitute during the delayed 2019–20 UEFA Women's Champions League quarter-final against Arsenal. She scored three minutes later, the winning goal in the single-legged 2–1 win. The following season, Bruun won the 2020–21 Division 1 Féminine title with PSG, the club's first league title, ending Lyon's 14-year streak at the top in the process.

In June 2021, Bruun joined Lyon.

On 27 January 2022, Bruun made a deadline day move to English FA Women's Super League club Manchester United on loan for the remainder of the 2021–22 season. The spell was marred by injury, limiting Bruun to seven appearances in all competitions in which she failed to score a goal for the club.

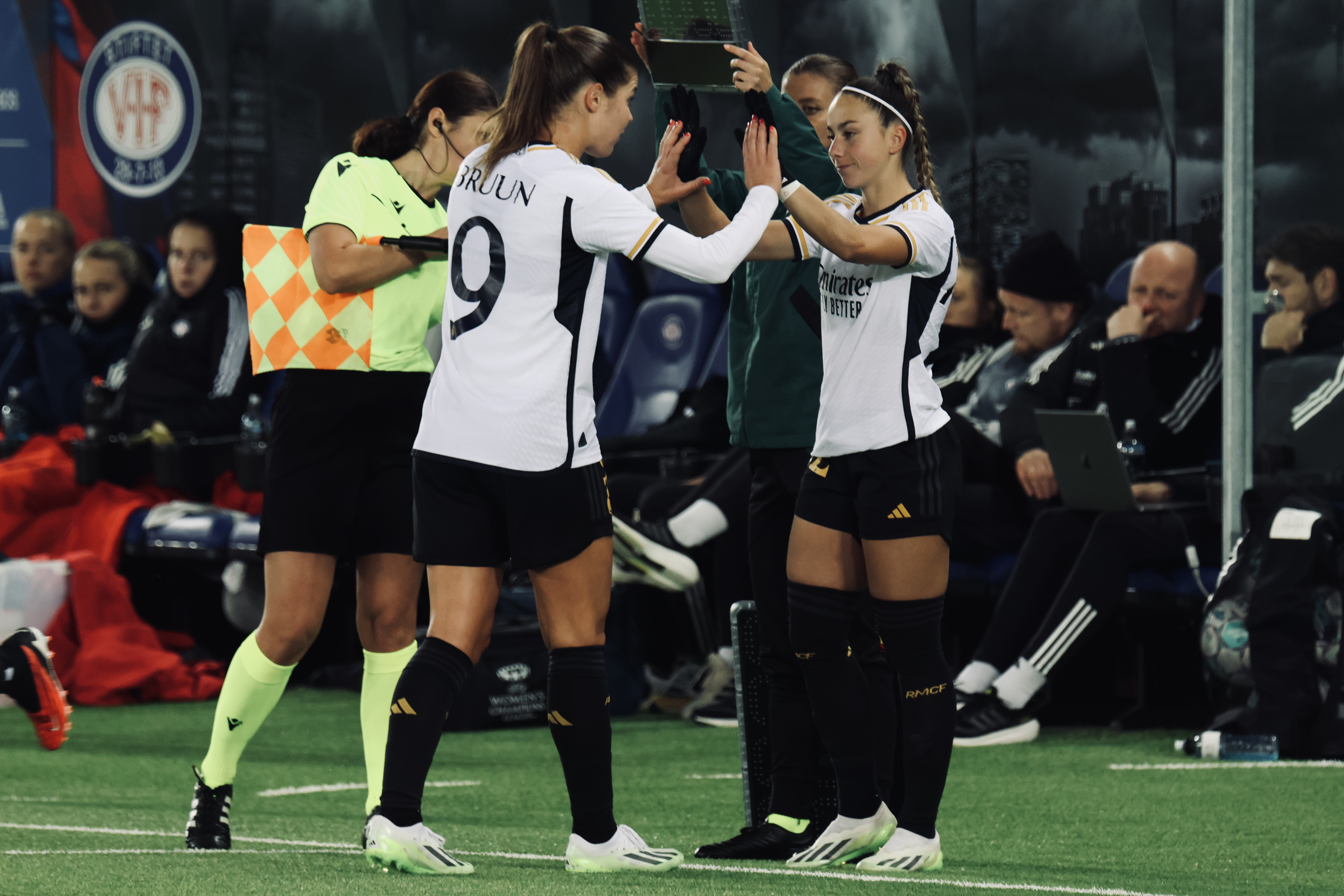
Bruun in action with Real Madrid along with Athenea in 2023

On 10 July 2023, Bruun joined Real Madrid She quickly became an important player for the club, scoring 32 goals in all competitions during her first two seasons with the Spanish team. However, in the 2025–26 season, she suffered a serious injury and was unable to feature regularly, although she still managed to score 5 goals in all competitions. She is under contract with Real Madrid until 2027.

== International career ==
=== Youth ===
Bruun played as a youth international for Denmark at under-16, under-17, under-19 and under-23 level. She finished as top scorer during 2015 UEFA Women's Under-17 Championship qualification, scoring 10 overall. The total included eight in a qualifying round match against Kazakhstan on 18 October 2014. It equalled the competition record for goals in a single match set by Vivianne Miedema against the same opposition in 2012. In 2015, having scored in three matches during qualifying, Bruun was selected to represent Denmark at the 2015 UEFA Women's Under-19 Championship held in Israel. She appeared in all three matches as Denmark were eliminated at the group stage.

=== Senior ===
On 24 October 2017, Bruun debuted for the senior Denmark national team in a 2019 FIFA Women's World Cup qualifier against Croatia. She entered play two minutes into stoppage time as a substitute for Nadia Nadim and scored her first goal two minutes later in Denmark's 4–0 victory. In 2021, Bruun went on a run of scoring in six consecutive matches for Denmark, scoring 12 goals in total all during 2023 FIFA Women's World Cup qualification.

== Personal life ==
In August 2021, Bruun joined a FIFPro 10-year research project tracking players' physical and mental wellbeing.

== Career statistics ==
=== Club ===
As of match played 26 March 2025

Appearances and goals by club, season and competition
Club	Season	League			National cup (Note: Includes Coupe de France Féminine, FA Women's Cup, Copa de la Reina)		Continental		Other		Total	
Club	Season	Division	Apps	Goals	Apps	Goals	Apps	Goals	Apps	Goals	Apps	Goals
Paris Saint-Germain	2018–19	D1 Féminine	13	3	1	0	3 (Note: Appearances in UEFA Women's Champions League)	1	—		17	4
Paris Saint-Germain	2019–20	D1 Féminine	0	0	2	1	2	1	—		4	2
Paris Saint-Germain	2020–21	D1 Féminine	18	7	1	1	4	0	—		23	8
Paris Saint-Germain	Total		31	10	4	2	9	2	0	0	44	14
Lyon	2021–22	D1 Féminine	11	6	0	0	8	1	—		19	7
Lyon	2022–23	D1 Féminine	18	8	0	0	6	2	—		24	10
Lyon	Total		29	14	0	0	14	3	—		43	17
Manchester United (loan)	2021–22	Women's Super League	5	0	1	0	—		1 (Note: Appearance(s) in Women's League Cup)	0	7	0
Real Madrid	2023–24	Liga F	25	13	1	0	5	1	—		31	14
Real Madrid	2024–25	Liga F	19	9	3	1	9	5	2 (Note: Appearances in Supercopa de España)	0	33	15
Real Madrid	Total		44	22	4	1	14	6	2	0	64	29
Career total			109	46	6	3	37	11	3	0	158	60

=== International ===
As of match played 12 July 2025

Appearances and goals by national team and year
National team	Year	Apps	Goals
Denmark	2017	1	1
Denmark	2018	1	0
Denmark	2019	6	0
Denmark	2020	4	1
Denmark	2021	7	12
Denmark	2022	10	4
Denmark	2023	10	0
Denmark	2024	8	5
Denmark	2025	8	2
Total		55	25

Scores and results list Denmark's goal tally first. Score column indicates score after each Bruun goal.

International goals by date, venue, opponent, score, result and competition
No.	Date	Venue	Opponent	Score	Result	Competition
1	24 October 2017	Ivan Laljak-Ivić Stadium, Zaprešić, Croatia	Croatia	4–0	4–0	2019 FIFA World Cup qualification
2	22 September 2020	Centenary Stadium, Ta' Qali, Malta	Malta	7–0	8–0	UEFA Euro 2022 qualification
3	16 September 2021	Viborg Stadium, Viborg, Denmark	Malta	2–0	7–0	2023 FIFA Women's World Cup qualification
4	16 September 2021	Viborg Stadium, Viborg, Denmark	Malta	5–0	7–0	2023 FIFA Women's World Cup qualification
5	21 September 2021	ASK Arena, Baku, Azerbaijan	Azerbaijan	1–0	8–0	2023 FIFA Women's World Cup qualification
6	21 September 2021	ASK Arena, Baku, Azerbaijan	Azerbaijan	6–0	8–0	2023 FIFA Women's World Cup qualification
7	21 October 2021	Viborg Stadium, Viborg, Denmark	Bosnia and Herzegovina	1–0	8–0	2023 FIFA Women's World Cup qualification
8	21 October 2021	Viborg Stadium, Viborg, Denmark	Bosnia and Herzegovina	2–0	8–0	2023 FIFA Women's World Cup qualification
9	21 October 2021	Viborg Stadium, Viborg, Denmark	Bosnia and Herzegovina	3–0	8–0	2023 FIFA Women's World Cup qualification
10	21 October 2021	Viborg Stadium, Viborg, Denmark	Bosnia and Herzegovina	4–0	8–0	2023 FIFA Women's World Cup qualification
11	21 October 2021	Viborg Stadium, Viborg, Denmark	Bosnia and Herzegovina	5–0	8–0	2023 FIFA Women's World Cup qualification
12	26 October 2021	Podgorica City Stadium, Podgorica, Montenegro	Montenegro	2–0	5–1	2023 FIFA Women's World Cup qualification
13	25 November 2021	BIH FA Training Centre, Zenica, Bosnia and Herzegovina	Bosnia and Herzegovina	2–0	3–0	2023 FIFA Women's World Cup qualification
14	30 November 2021	Viborg Stadium, Viborg, Denmark	Russia	1–0	3–1	2023 FIFA Women's World Cup qualification
15	29 June 2022	Viborg Stadium, Viborg, Denmark	Norway	1–0	1–2	Friendly
16	1 September 2022	Viborg Stadium, Viborg, Denmark	Montenegro	4–1	5–1	2023 FIFA Women's World Cup qualification
17	11 November 2022	wefox Arena Schaffhausen, Schaffhausen, Switzerland	Switzerland	1–1	2–1	Friendly
18	11 November 2022	wefox Arena Schaffhausen, Schaffhausen, Switzerland	Switzerland	2–1	2–1	Friendly
19	16 July 2024	Vejle Stadium, Vejle, Denmark	Czech Republic	1–0	2–0	UEFA Euro 2025 qualification
20	25 October 2024	Aalborg Stadium, Aalborg, Denmark	South Africa	2–0	5–0	Friendly
21	25 October 2024	Aalborg Stadium, Aalborg, Denmark	South Africa	3–0	5–0	Friendly
22	2 December 2024	Pinatar Arena, San Pedro del Pinatar, Spain	Iceland	1–0	2–0	Friendly
23	2 December 2024	Pinatar Arena, San Pedro del Pinatar, Spain	Iceland	2–0	2–0	Friendly
24	4 April 2025	Cardiff City Stadium, Cardiff, Wales	Wales	1–0	2–1	2025 UEFA Women's Nations League
25	12 July 2025	Swissporarena, Lucerne, Switzerland	Poland	2–3	2–3	UEFA Women's Euro 2025

== Honours ==
Fortuna Hjørring

- Elitedivisionen: 2015–16, 2017–18
- Danish Women's Cup: 2016

Paris Saint-Germain

- Division 1 Féminine: 2020–21

Lyon

- Division 1 Féminine: 2022–23
- Coupe de France: 2022–23
- Trophée des Championnes: 2022
- UEFA Women's Champions League: 2021–22

Individual

- Danish Breakthrough Player of the Year: 2017
- Danish Football Player of the Year: 2021
