= 2025–26 Real Madrid Femenino season =

Real Madrid Femenino
2025–26 season
- President: Florentino Pérez
- Coach: Pau Quesada
- Stadium: Alfredo Di Stéfano Stadium
- Liga F: 2nd
- Copa de la Reina: Quarter-finals
- Supercopa de España: Runners-up
- UEFA Champions League: Quarter-finals
- Top goalscorer: League: Caroline Weir (13); All: Caroline Weir (19)
- Biggest win: Home: Real Madrid 6–2 AS Roma (8 October 2025); Away: Espanyol 0–4 Real Madrid (20 December 2025)
- Biggest defeat: Home: Real Madrid 2–6 Barcelona (25 March 2026); Away: Barcelona 6–0 Real Madrid (2 April 2026)
| Home colours | Away colours | Third colours |
- All statistics correct as of 27 May 2026.

The 2025–26 season was the tenth in the history of Real Madrid Femenino and the club's sixth since being officially incorporated under the Real Madrid banner. During this campaign, the team will compete in the Primera División, the Copa de la Reina, the Supercopa de España, and the UEFA Champions League. Real Madrid Femenino hosts its home fixtures at the Alfredo Di Stéfano Stadium.

This season is the first since 2020-21 without Olga Carmona, who departed to French club PSG.

== Summary ==
On 20 May, two days after the conclusion of the 2024–25 season, Madrid announced the departure of their captain, Olga Carmona, who left as the player with the most appearances in the club's history. On 28 May, Madrid announced the end of Alberto Toril's time as coach, having been in the position since 2021. The next day, Madrid announced the departure of Caroline Møller. On 2 June, Madrid announced the departure of Mylène Chavas. The next day, the departure of Carla Camacho was also officialized. On 13 June, Melanie Leupolz announced her retirement from the sport. On 17 June, Madrid announced the appointment of Pau Quesada as new coach, joining for the next two seasons. On 19 June, Sara Däbritz was announced as the first of Real Madrid's summer signings, joining on a 2-year deal. On 23 June, the club announced the signing of Merle Frohms on three-year contract. The next day, Madrid announced the signing of Sara Holmgaard, joining the club on a contract running until 2027. On 2 July, Madrid announced the signing of Hanna Bennison, joining on a three-year deal. On 24 July, Real Madrid announced the promotion of Paula Comendador from the B team. On 30 July, the club announced the signing of Bella Andersson, who joined the club on a 4-year deal.

Real Madrid began their pre-season on 10 August 2025 with a 3–1 win over Madrid CFF at the Estadio Alfredo Di Stéfano, courtesy of goals from Feller, Navarro and Weir On 17 August, the team continued their preparations with a 3–1 victory against German side 1. FC Union Berlin at the Stadion An der Alten Försterei, with Navarro scoring and Bruun adding a brace On 21 August 2025, Madrid concluded their pre-season with a 4–1 defeat against FC Bayern Munich at the FC Bayern Campus, shortly before the start of the Liga F season On 19 September 2025, the club announced the signing of Lotte Keukelaar on a five-year contract.

== Kits ==
Supplier: Adidas / Sponsor: Fly Emirates

| Home | Home alt. | Away | Third |

| Goalkeeper 1 | Goalkeeper 2 | Goalkeeper 3 | Goalkeeper 4 | Goalkeeper 5 |

For the 2025–26 season, Real Madrid's kits are once again produced by Adidas, with Emirates serving as the principal shirt sponsor and HP featured on the sleeve. The home kit stays faithful to the club's traditional identity, with an all-white shirt and shorts. While maintaining its classic look, the design incorporates subtle metallic details and accents in yellow, grey, and black, echoing elements from the 2009–10 and 2015–16 editions. The home strip was first unveiled in June 2025.

The away kit adopts a darker, modern approach, being presented entirely in deep navy blue. Inspired by the contemporary aesthetics of the renovated Santiago Bernabéu Stadium, the kit uses clean, minimal detailing, offering a contrast to the lighter tones of the home strip.

The third kit provides a brighter alternative, being released in a vivid blue shade with white applications. It carries the adidas Originals trefoil logo, further distinguishing it from the other outfield kits. As a symbolic tribute, the inside of the collar bears the words of Juanito, the legendary forward whose phrase “90 minutes at the Bernabéu is a very long time” remains one of the most iconic in the club's history.

In addition to the outfield designs, several goalkeeper kits were introduced for the campaign. The first-choice goalkeeper kit is blue with white detailing, the second option is light green with black accents, and the third strip is dark grey with white trim. Together, these goalkeeper kits provide both vibrant and classic variations, complementing the club's three main outfield designs.

== Players ==
=== Current squad ===
As of 2 May 2026

| No. | Pos. | Nat. | Name | Age | Since |
Goalkeepers
| 1 | GK | (Spain) | Misa Rodríguez (captain) | 27 | 2020 |
| 13 | GK | (Germany) | Merle Frohms | 31 | 2025 |
Defenders
| 2 | DF | (Brazil) | Antônia | 32 | 2024 |
| 4 | DF | (Spain) | Rocío Gálvez (3rd captain) | 29 | 2021 |
| 12 | DF | (Brazil) | Yasmim | 29 | 2025 |
| 14 | DF | (Spain) | María Méndez | 25 | 2024 |
| 15 | DF | (Spain) | Sheila García | 29 | 2024 |
| 21 | DF | (Denmark) | Sara Holmgaard | 27 | 2025 |
| 22 | DF | (Sweden) | Bella Andersson | 20 | 2025 |
| 23 | DF | (France) | Maëlle Lakrar | 26 | 2024 |
Midfielders
| 3 | MF | (Spain) | Teresa Abelleira (vice captain) | 26 | 2020 |
| 6 | MF | (France) | Sandie Toletti | 31 | 2022 |
| 8 | MF | (Germany) | Sara Däbritz | 31 | 2025 |
| 10 | MF | (Scotland) | Caroline Weir | 31 | 2022 |
| 16 | MF | (Sweden) | Filippa Angeldahl | 29 | 2024 |
| 17 | MF | (Sweden) | Hanna Bennison | 23 | 2025 |
Forwards
| 5 | FW | (Spain) | Paula Comendador | 19 | 2021 |
| 7 | FW | (Spain) | Athenea del Castillo (4th captain) | 25 | 2021 |
| 9 | FW | (Denmark) | Signe Bruun | 28 | 2023 |
| 11 | FW | (Spain) | Alba Redondo | 30 | 2024 |
| 18 | FW | (Colombia) | Linda Caicedo | 21 | 2023 |
| 19 | FW | (Spain) | Eva Navarro | 25 | 2024 |
| 20 | FW | (France) | Naomie Feller | 24 | 2022 |
| 24 | FW | (Netherlands) | Lotte Keukelaar | 20 | 2025 |

=== Reserve team ===
Players from Real Madrid Femenino B who have a squad number and are eligible to play for the first team and are in regular first team training.

As of 15 September 2025

| No. | Pos. | Nat. | Name |
Reserves
| 27 | DF | (Spain) | Noemí Bejarano |
| 28 | MF | (Spain) | Irune Dorado |
| 29 | DF | (Spain) | Silvia Cristóbal |
| 33 | MF | (Spain) | Adriana Folgado |
| 43 | FW | (Spain) | Iris Santiago |

== Captains ==
=== Captain ===
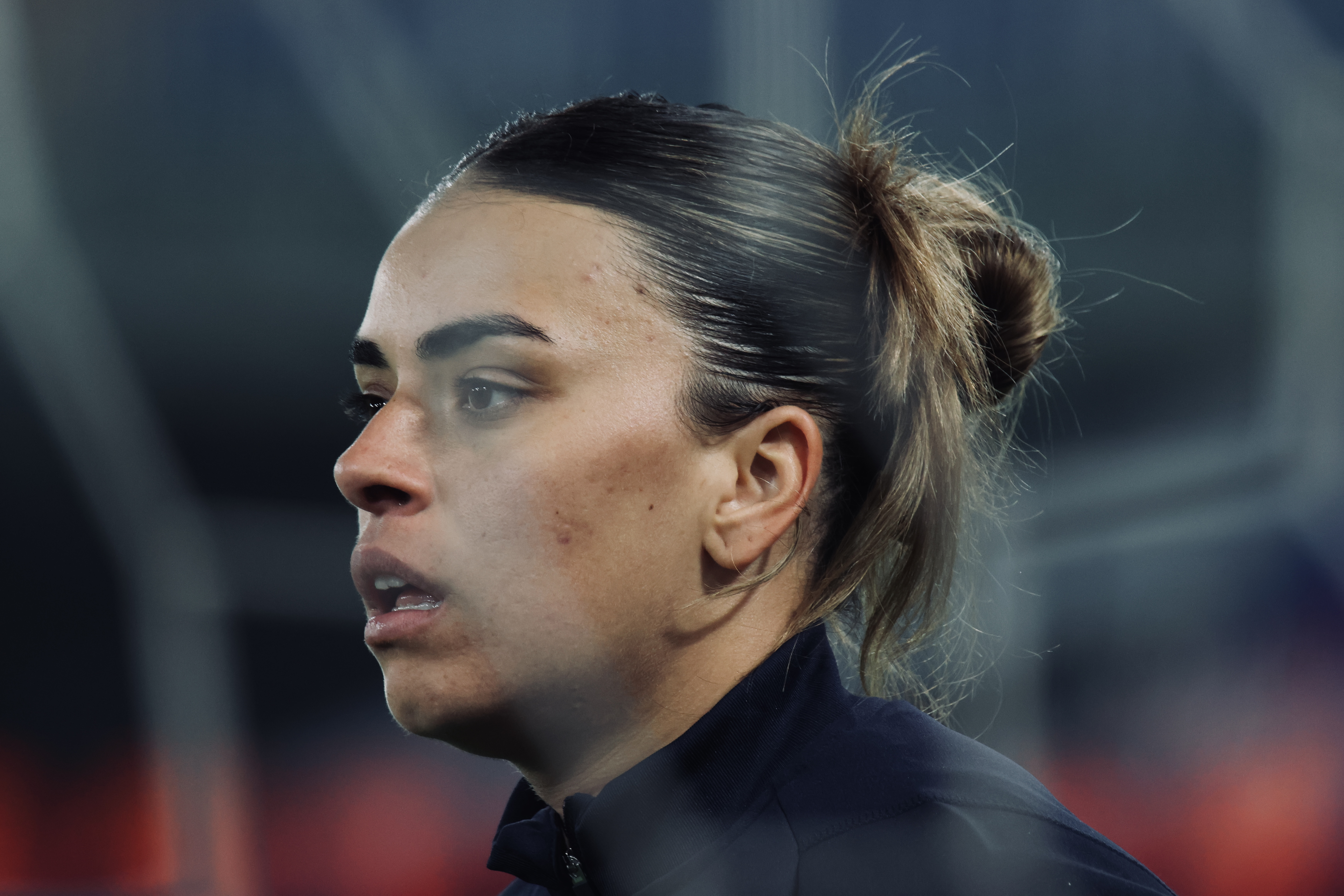
Misa in 2023

Misa Rodríguez is the captain of Real Madrid Femenino. A goalkeeper for the club since the 2020–21 season, she has made over 210 appearances in all competitions.

=== Vice Captain ===
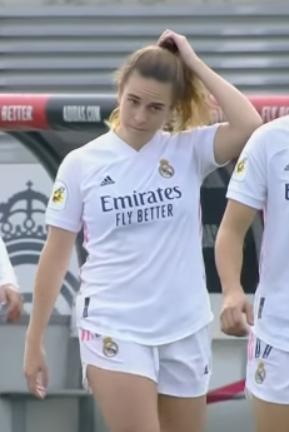
Teresa Abelleira in 2020

Teresa Abelleira is the vice captain of Real Madrid Femenino. A midfielder who joined the club in 2020, she has made over 160 appearances in all competitions.

=== 3rd Captain ===
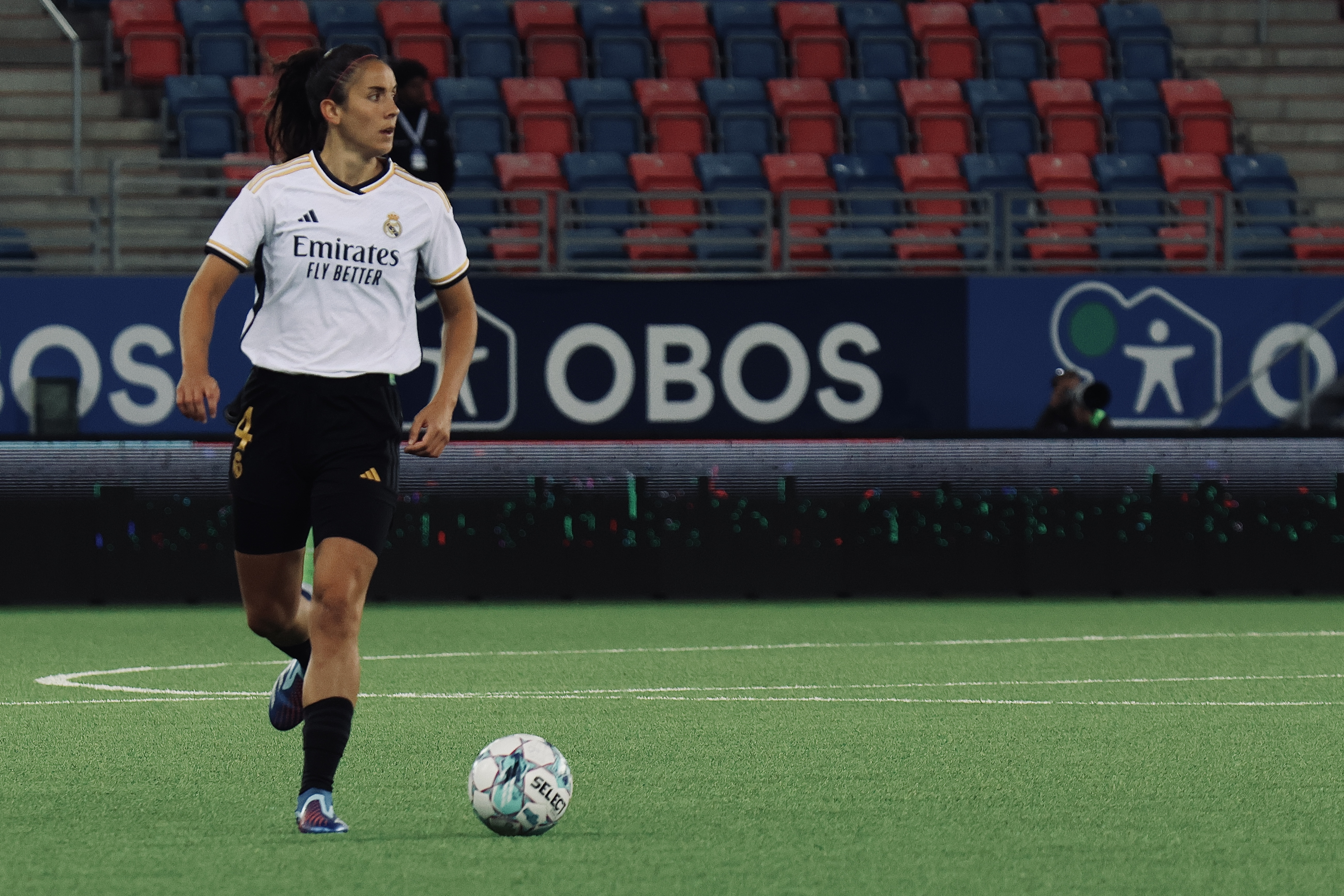
Rocío Gálvez in 2023

Rocío Gálvez is the third captain of Real Madrid Femenino. A defender who joined the club in 2021, she has made over 120 appearances in all competitions.

=== 4th Captain ===
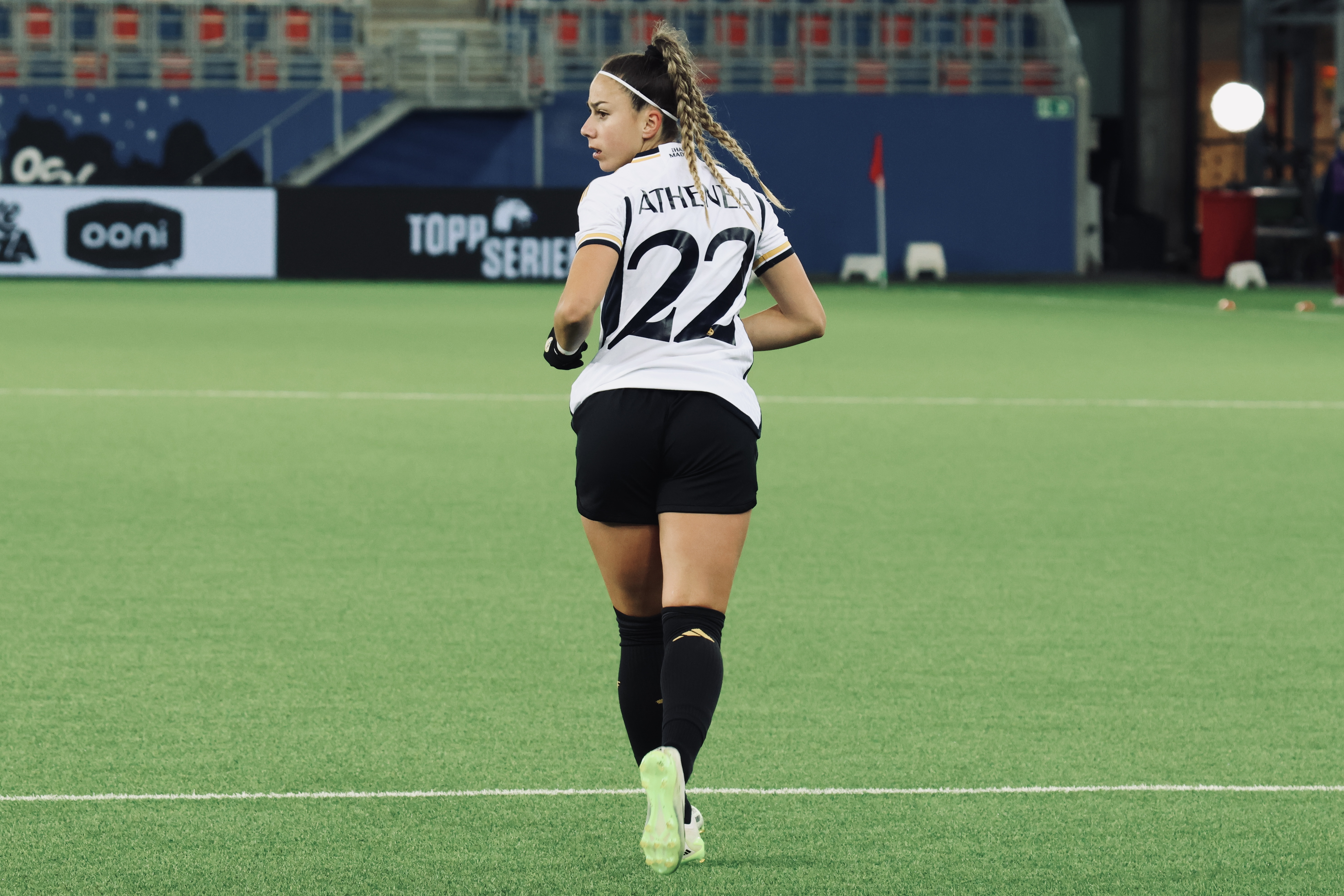
Athenea del Castillo in 2023

Athenea del Castillo is the fourth captain of Real Madrid Femenino. A forward who joined the club in 2021, she has made over 200 appearances in all competitions.

== Transfers ==
=== In ===
| Date | Pos. | Player | From | Type | Ref. |
|---|---|---|---|---|---|
| 1 July 2025 | MF | (Germany) Sara Däbritz | (France) Lyon | Free transfer | |
| 1 July 2025 | GK | (Germany) Merle Frohms | (Germany) VfL Wolfsburg | Free transfer | |
| 1 July 2025 | DF | (Denmark) Sara Holmgaard | (England) Everton | Free transfer | |
| 2 July 2025 | MF | (Sweden) Hanna Bennison | (Italy) Juventus FC | Transfer | |
| 24 July 2025 | FW | (Spain) Paula Comendador | (Spain) Real Madrid Fem B | Promotion to first team | |
| 30 July 2025 | DF | (Sweden) Bella Andersson | (Sweden) Hammarby IF | Transfer | |
| 19 September 2025 | FW | (Netherlands) Lotte Keukelaar | (Netherlands) AFC Ajax | Transfer | |

=== Out ===
| Date | Pos. | Player | To | Type | Ref. |
|---|---|---|---|---|---|
| 1 July 2025 | DF | (Spain) Olga Carmona | (France) Paris Saint-Germain | End of contract | |
| 1 July 2025 | GK | (France) Mylène Chavas | (France) Paris FC | End of contract | |
| 1 July 2025 | FW | (Denmark) Caroline Møller | (Portugal) S.L. Benfica | End of contract | |
| 1 July 2025 | FW | (Spain) Carla Camacho | (England) Brighton & Hove Albion | End of contract | |
| 1 July 2025 | MF | (Germany) Melanie Leupolz | Retired | | |
| 1 July 2025 | MF | (Spain) Olaya Enrique | (Spain) Deportivo de La Coruña | Transfer | |
| 2 August 2025 | FW | (Spain) Paula Partido | (England) London City Lionesses | Transfer | |

== Pre-season and friendlies ==
Win Draw Loss Fixtures

| 10 August 2025 1 | Real Madrid (Spain) | 3–1 | (Spain) Madrid CFF | Madrid |
| | Feller 2'; Navarro 25'; Weir 49' | Report | Marcos 32' | Stadium: Estadio Alfredo Di Stéfano |

| 17 August 2025 2 | Union Berlin (Germany) | 1–3 | (Spain) Real Madrid | Köpenick |
| 15:30 CEST (UTC+2) | Orschmann 50' | Report | Navarro 11'; Bruun 43', 48' | Stadium: Stadion An der Alten Försterei; Attendance: 13,132 |

| 21 August 2025 3 | Bayern Munich (Germany) | 4-1 | (Spain) Real Madrid | Munich |
| 16:00 CEST (UTC+2) | Stanway 7' (pen.); Dallmann 8'; Tanikawa 32'; Padilla 67' | Report | Feller 37' | Stadium: FC Bayern Campus |

== Statistics ==
=== Overall ===
As of 31 May 2026

| No. | Position | Nationality | Player | Liga F | | Copa de la Reina | | Champions League | | Supercopa de España | |
| No. | Position | Nationality | Player | Apps | Goals | Apps | Goals | Apps | Goals | Apps | Goals |
|---|---|---|---|---|---|---|---|---|---|---|---|
| 1 | GK | (Spain) | Misa Rodríguez | 19 | 0 | 2 | 0 | 8 | 0 | 2 | 0 |
| 2 | DF | (Brazil) | Antônia | 4 | 0 | 0 | 0 | 1 | 0 | 0 | 0 |
| 3 | MF | (Spain) | Teresa Abelleira | 0 | 0 | 0 | 0 | 0 | 0 | 0 | 0 |
| 4 | DF | (Spain) | Rocío Gálvez | 17 | 4 | 0 | 0 | 4 | 0 | 0 | 0 |
| 5 | FW | (Spain) | Paula Comendador | 16 | 2 | 1 | 0 | 4 | 0 | 0 | 0 |
| 6 | MF | (France) | Sandie Toletti | 18 | 2 | 1 | 0 | 8 | 0 | 2 | 0 |
| 7 | FW | (Spain) | Athenea del Castillo | 28 | 6 | 2 | 0 | 12 | 1 | 2 | 1 |
| 8 | MF | (Germany) | Sara Däbritz | 24 | 4 | 2 | 0 | 11 | 1 | 2 | 0 |
| 9 | FW | (Denmark) | Signe Bruun | 6 | 3 | 1 | 0 | 2 | 2 | 1 | 0 |
| 10 | MF | (Scotland) | Caroline Weir | 27 | 14 | 2 | 0 | 10 | 5 | 2 | 1 |
| 11 | FW | (Spain) | Alba Redondo | 26 | 7 | 1 | 0 | 9 | 3 | 1 | 0 |
| 12 | DF | (Brazil) | Yasmim | 13 | 0 | 1 | 0 | 11 | 0 | 2 | 0 |
| 13 | GK | (Germany) | Merle Frohms | 11 | 0 | 0 | 0 | 4 | 0 | 0 | 0 |
| 14 | DF | (Spain) | María Méndez | 21 | 1 | 2 | 0 | 12 | 1 | 2 | 0 |
| 15 | DF | (Spain) | Sheila García | 22 | 0 | 2 | 0 | 6 | 0 | 2 | 0 |
| 16 | MF | (Sweden) | Filippa Angeldahl | 25 | 1 | 2 | 0 | 11 | 1 | 2 | 0 |
| 17 | MF | (Sweden) | Hanna Bennison | 13 | 1 | 1 | 0 | 4 | 0 | 0 | 0 |
| 18 | FW | (Colombia) | Linda Caicedo | 25 | 5 | 2 | 2 | 11 | 5 | 2 | 1 |
| 19 | FW | (Spain) | Eva Navarro | 28 | 2 | 2 | 0 | 10 | 1 | 2 | 0 |
| 20 | FW | (France) | Naomie Feller | 20 | 2 | 2 | 0 | 12 | 3 | 2 | 0 |
| 21 | DF | (Denmark) | Sara Holmgaard | 23 | 3 | 1 | 0 | 3 | 0 | 1 | 0 |
| 22 | DF | (Sweden) | Bella Andersson | 15 | 0 | 1 | 0 | 1 | 0 | 0 | 0 |
| 23 | DF | (France) | Maëlle Lakrar | 13 | 0 | 1 | 0 | 10 | 1 | 2 | 0 |
| 24 | FW | (Netherlands) | Lotte Keukelaar | 8 | 1 | 0 | 0 | 3 | 0 | 1 | 0 |

=== Goals ===
As of 31 May 2026.

| Rank | No. | Pos. | Nat. | Player | Liga F | CDLR | Supercopa | UWCL | Total |
|---|---|---|---|---|---|---|---|---|---|
| 1 | 10 | MF | (Scotland) | Caroline Weir | 14 | – | 1 | 5 | 20 |
| 2 | 18 | FW | (Colombia) | Linda Caicedo | 5 | 2 | 1 | 5 | 13 |
| 3 | 11 | FW | (Spain) | Alba Redondo | 7 | – | – | 3 | 10 |
| 4 | 7 | FW | (Spain) | Athenea del Castillo | 6 | – | 1 | 1 | 8 |
| 5 | 9 | FW | (Denmark) | Signe Bruun | 3 | – | – | 2 | 5 |
| 6 | 8 | MF | (Germany) | Sara Däbritz | 4 | – | – | 1 | 5 |
| 7 | 20 | FW | (France) | Naomie Feller | 2 | – | – | 3 | 5 |
| 8 | 4 | DF | (Spain) | Rocío Gálvez | 4 | – | – | - | 4 |
| 9 | 43 | FW | (Spain) | Iris Ashley | 2 | 2 | – | - | 4 |
| 10 | 21 | DF | (Denmark) | Sara Holmgaard | 3 | – | – | - | 3 |
| Total | | | | | 50 | 4 | 3 | 20 | 77 |

Source: FBREF

=== Clean sheets ===
As of 31 May 2026.

| Rank | No. | Nat. | Player | Liga F | CDLR | Supercopa | UWCL | Total |
|---|---|---|---|---|---|---|---|---|
| 1 | 1 | (Spain) | Misa Rodríguez | 14 | 1 | – | 2 | 17 |
| 2 | 13 | (Germany) | Merle Frohms | 6 | – | – | 1 | 7 |
| Total | | | | 20 | 1 | – | 3 | 24 |

Source: FBREF

== Competitions ==
=== League table ===
| Pos | Team | Pld | W | D | L | GF | GA | GD | Pts | Qualification or relegation |
|---|---|---|---|---|---|---|---|---|---|---|
| 1 | Barcelona (C) | 30 | 29 | 0 | 1 | 130 | 9 | +121 | 87 | Qualification for the Champions League league phase |
| 2 | Real Madrid | 30 | 23 | 3 | 4 | 65 | 18 | +47 | 72 | Qualification for the Champions League third qualifying round |
| 3 | Real Sociedad | 30 | 20 | 6 | 4 | 61 | 27 | +34 | 66 | Qualification for the Champions League third qualifying round |
| 4 | Tenerife | 30 | 14 | 12 | 4 | 49 | 22 | +27 | 54 | |
| 5 | Atlético Madrid | 30 | 14 | 9 | 7 | 63 | 39 | +24 | 51 | |

Updated to match(es) played on 31 May 2026. Source: LigaF.es
Rules for classification: 1) Points; 2) Head-to-head points; 3) Goal difference; 4) Number of goals scored
(C) Champions

=== Overall record ===
| Competition | First match | Last match | Starting round | Final position | Record | | | | | | | |
| Competition | First match | Last match | Starting round | Final position | Pld | W | D | L | GF | GA | GD | Win % |
|---|---|---|---|---|---|---|---|---|---|---|---|---|
| Liga F | 31 August 2025 | 30 May 2026 | Matchday 1 | Runners-up | 30 | 23 | 3 | 4 | 65 | 18 | +47 | 76.67 |
| Copa de la Reina | 21 December 2025 | 6 February 2026 | Round of 16 | Quarter-finals | 2 | 1 | 0 | 1 | 4 | 4 | +0 | 50.00 |
| Supercopa de España | 21 January 2026 | | Semi-finals | Runners-up | 2 | 1 | 0 | 1 | 3 | 3 | +0 | 50.00 |
| UEFA Women's Champions League | 11 September 2025 | 2 April 2026 | Third qualifying round | Quarter-finals | 12 | 7 | 2 | 3 | 25 | 22 | +3 | 58.33 |
| Total | | | | | 46 | 32 | 5 | 9 | 97 | 47 | +50 | 69.57 |

Source: Soccerway

=== Liga F ===
==== Results by round ====
| Match | 1 | 2 | 3 | 4 | 5 | 6 | 7 | 8 | 9 | 10 | 11 | 12 | 13 | 14 | 15 | 16 | 17 | 18 | 19 | 20 | 21 | 22 | 23 | 24 | 25 | 26 | 27 | 28 | 29 | 30 |
|---|---|---|---|---|---|---|---|---|---|---|---|---|---|---|---|---|---|---|---|---|---|---|---|---|---|---|---|---|---|---|
| Ground | A | A | H | H | A | H | A | H | A | H | A | H | H | A | H | A | H | A | H | A | H | A | A | H | A | H | A | H | A | H |
| Result | D | L | W | W | D | W | W | W | W | W | L | W | W | W | W | W | W | W | W | W | W | W | W | L | W | D | W | W | W | W |
| Position | 7 | 10 | 7 | 5 | 5 | 5 | 4 | 4 | 3 | 3 | 4 | 3 | 3 | 2 | 2 | 2 | 2 | 2 | 2 | 2 | 2 | 2 | 2 | 2 | 2 | 2 | 2 | 2 | 2 | 2 |

Source: La Liga
A = Away; H = Home; W = Win; D = Draw; L = Loss

==== Matches ====
| 31 August 2025 1 | DUX Logroño | 2–2 | Real Madrid | Logroño |
| 20:00 CEST (UTC+2) | Isina 44'; Frohms 77' (o.g.) | Report | Méndez 33'; Bruun 90+3' | Stadium: Estadio Las Gaunas; Referee: Zulema González |

| 5 September 2025 2 | Atlético Madrid | 2–1 | Real Madrid | Madrid |
| 20:00 CEST | Lauren 17'; Luany 83' | Report | Bruun (red card) 60'; Däbritz 72' | Stadium: Centro Deportivo Wanda; Attendance: 1,904; Referee: Marta Huerta |

| 14 September 2025 3 | Real Madrid | 2–1 | Madrid CFF | Madrid |
| 18:00 CEST | Redondo 17'; Weir 34' | Report | Sosa 21' | Stadium: Estadio Alfredo Di Stéfano; Referee: Olatz Rivera |

| 21 September 2025 4 | Real Madrid | 4–0 | Deportivo | Madrid |
| 18:30 CEST | Weir 2'; Däbritz 10', 54'; García (red card) 32'; del Castillo 90+2' | Report | | Stadium: Estadio Alfredo Di Stéfano; Referee: Elena Peláez |

| 28 September 2025 5 | Tenerife | 0–0 | Real Madrid | Tenerife |
| 17:30 CEST | | Report | | Stadium: Estadio Heliodoro Rodríguez López; Referee: Paola Cebollada |

| 4 October 2025 6 | Real Madrid | 3–0 | Levante Badalona | Madrid |
| 17:00 CEST | Caicedo 26'; Feller 38'; del Castillo 58' | Report | | Stadium: Estadio Alfredo Di Stéfano; Referee: María Eugenia Gil |

| 12 October 2025 7 | Athletic Club | 1–4 | Real Madrid | Bilbao |
| 17:00 CEST | Nevado 72' | Report | Weir 13', 82'; Campos 19' (o.g.); Ashley 90' | Stadium: San Mamés |

| 19 October 2025 8 | Real Madrid | 4–0 | Levante | Madrid |
| 16:00 CEST | Comendador 17'; Holmgaard 57'; Redondo 59'; Rocío 63' | Report | | Stadium: Estadio Alfredo Di Stéfano |

| 1 November 2025 9 | Espanyol | 0–1 | Real Madrid | Sant Adrià de Besòs |
| 17:30 CEST | Vallejo (yellow card) 35'; Campo (yellow card) 45+4' | Report | Botero 41' (o.g.); Méndez (yellow card) 78' | Stadium: Ciutat Esportiva Dani Jarque; Referee: María Gloria Planes Terol |

| 8 November 2025 10 | Real Madrid | 5–0 | Alhama | Madrid |
| 18:00 CEST | Santamaría 30' (o.g.); Comendador (yellow card) 37'; Cristóbal 50'; Keukelaar 54'; Ashley 89'; Caicedo 90+4' | Report | Zumárraga (yellow card) 9'; Santamaría (yellow card) 17' | Stadium: Estadio Alfredo Di Stéfano; Referee: Lorena Del Mar |

| 15 November 2025 11 | Barcelona | 4–0 | Real Madrid | Sant Joan Despí |
| 15:00 CEST | Pajor 15', 30'; Putellas (yellow card) 28'; Serrajordi (yellow card) 89'; Schertenleib 91'; Bonmatí 93' | Report | Yasmim (yellow card) 52'; Däbritz 53'; Dorado (yellow card) 88'; Navarro (yellow card) 90+2'; Comendador (yellow card) 90+6' | Stadium: Johan Cruyff Stadium; Referee: Paola Cebollada López |

| 23 November 2025 12 | Real Madrid | 3–0 | Eibar | Madrid |
| | Weir 2', 47'; Holmgaard (yellow card) 50'; Gálvez 84'; Cristóbal (yellow card) 88' | Report | Altonaga (yellow card) 78' | Stadium: Estadio Alfredo Di Stéfano; Referee: Ylenia Sánchez Miguel |

| 6 December 2025 13 | Real Madrid | 1–0 | Real Sociedad | Madrid |
| | Vicente 43' (o.g.); García (yellow card) 90+3' | Report | Imade (yellow card) 73'; Egiguren (yellow card) 83'; Aparicio (yellow card) 86' | Stadium: Estadio Alfredo Di Stéfano; Referee: María Gloria Planes Terol |

| 13 December 2025 14 | Granada | 0–3 | Real Madrid | Granada |
| | | Report | Comendador 30' (yellow card) 86'; Redondo 44', 45+4'; Navarro (yellow card) 90' | Stadium: Nuevo Los Cármenes; Referee: Ainara Andrea Acevedo Dudley |

| 10 January 2026 15 | Real Madrid | 2–0 | Sevilla | Madrid |
| | Caicedo 23'; Weir 29'; Santiago (yellow card) 81'; Angeldahl (penalty missed) 82' | | Arnaiz (yellow card) 43'; García (yellow card) 50'; Martín-Pozuelo (yellow card) 62' | Stadium: Estadio Alfredo Di Stéfano; Attendance: 1,435; Referee: Ylenia Sánchez Miguel |

| 18 January 2026 16 | Levante | 1–2 | Real Madrid | Buñol |
| | Silva 32' | Report | del Castillo 10', 25' | Stadium: Ciudad Deportiva de Buñol |

| 1 February 2026 18 | Deportivo | 2–4 | Real Madrid | A Coruña |
| | Martínez 15'; Pizarro 25' | Report | Gálvez 18'; Bruun 22'; Weir 73' (.pen) 89' (.pen) | Stadium: Cidade Deportiva de Abegondo |

| 8 February 2026 19 | Real Madrid | 3–0 | Espanyol | Madrid |
| | Bruun 6'; del Castillo 18'; Holmgaard 60' | Report | | Stadium: Estadio Alfredo Di Stéfano |

| 15 February 2026 20 | Alhama | 0–3 | Real Madrid | Alhama de Murcia |
| | | Report | Bennison 9'; Toletti 30' (pen.); Redondo 48' | Stadium: Deportivo del Guadalentín; Referee: Ylenia Sánchez Miguel |

| 22 February 2026 21 | Real Madrid | 2–0 | Tenerife | Madrid |
| | Redondo 46'; Angeldahl 59' | Report | Moreno (red card) 7' | Stadium: Estadio Alfredo Di Stéfano; Attendance: 1,156; Referee: Eugenia Gil Soriano |

| 14 March 2026 22 | Real Sociedad | 0–3 | Real Madrid | San Sebastián |
| | Fernández (red card) 68' | Report | Toletti 72' (pen.); Holmgaard 78'; Navarro 84' (pen.) | Stadium: Zubieta Facilities; Attendance: 1,410; Referee: María Planes |

| 22 March 2026 23 | Eibar | 0–1 | Real Madrid | Eibar |
| | | Report | Rocío 24' | Stadium: Unbe Sports Complex; Referee: Melissa López |

| 29 March 2026 24 | Real Madrid | 0–3 | Barcelona | Madrid |
| 21:00 CEST | Lakrar (yellow card) 13'; Toletti (yellow card) 75' | Report | Batlle 18'; Putellas 51'; Lakrar 55' (o.g.) | Stadium: Alfredo Di Stéfano Stadium; Attendance: 3,396; Referee: Olatz Rivera Olmedo |

| 5 April 2026 25 | Madrid CFF | 0–2 | Real Madrid | Fuenlabrada |
| 19:30 CEST | | Report | Caicedo 48'; Däbritz 73' | Stadium: Estadio Fernando Torres; Attendance: 824; Referee: Elisabeth Calvo |

| 26 April 2026 26 | Real Madrid | 1–1 | DUX Logroño | Madrid |
| 19:30 CEST | Caicedo 4' | Report | Leitner 90+11' | Stadium: Estadio Alfredo Di Stéfano; Referee: María Eugenia Gil Soriano |

| 3 May 2026 27 | Sevilla | 0–2 | Real Madrid | Seville |
| 18:30 CEST | Cortés (yellow card) 28'; Marques (yellow card) 62' | Report | Redondo 52'; Antônia (yellow card) 90+4'; Feller 90+5' | Stadium: Estadio Jesús Navas; Referee: Maria Gloria Planes Terol |

| 10 May 2026 28 | Real Madrid | 1–0 | Atlético Madrid | Madrid |
| 17:00 CEST | Weir 25'; Feller (yellow card) 71'; Dorado (yellow card) 80' | Report | Alexia (yellow card) 23'; Pérez (yellow card) 79'; Lauren (yellow card) 90+4' | Stadium: Estadio Alfredo Di Stéfano; Referee: Alicia Espinosa Ríos |

| 26 May 2026 29 | Levante Badalona | 0–4 | Real Madrid | Badalona |
| 19:00 CEST | González (yellow card) 90+4' | Report | Navarro 48'; Weir 53', 55', 84' | Stadium: Estadi Municipal; Referee: Elena Pelaez Arnillas |

| 30 May 2026 30 | Real Madrid | 2–0 | Granada | Madrid |
| 12:00 CEST | del Castillo 63'; Weir 68' | | | Stadium: Estadio Alfredo Di Stéfano; Referee: María Eugenia Gil Soriano |

=== Copa de la Reina ===
| 20 December 2025 Round of 16 | Espanyol | 0–4 | Real Madrid | Sant Adrià de Besòs |
| 19:00 CET (UTC+1) | | Report | Caicedo 12', 53'; Santiago 44', 56' | Stadium: Ciutat Esportiva Dani Jarque; Referee: Beatriz Cuesta Arribas |

| 5 February 2026 Quarter-finals | Real Madrid | 0–4 | Barcelona | Madrid |
| 21:00 CET (UTC+1) | | Report | Putellas 21'; Pajor 68', 81'; Paralluelo 74' | Stadium: Alfredo Di Stéfano Stadium; Attendance: 3,765; Referee: Lorena del Mar Trujillano |

=== Supercopa de España Femenina ===
| 20 January 2026 Semi-final | Real Madrid | 3–1 | Atlético Madrid | Castellón de la Plana |
| 19:15 CET (UTC+1) | del Castillo 6'; Weir 15'; Caicedo 19', (yellow card) 57'; Feller (yellow card) 57'; Däbritz (yellow card) 64' | Report | Luany 72'; Medina (yellow card) 85' | Stadium: Nou Estadi Castàlia; Attendance: 2,000; Referee: Paola Cebollada López |

| 24 January 2026 Final | Barcelona | 2–0 | Real Madrid | Castellón de la Plana |
| 19:00 CET (UTC+1) | Brugts 28'; Putellas 90+3' (pen.) | Report | | Stadium: Nou Estadi Castàlia; Attendance: 12,593; Referee: Eugenia Gil Soriano |

=== UEFA Champions League ===
==== Third Qualifying Round ====
The third round draw was held on 31 August 2025.

| 11 September 2025 First leg | Eintracht Frankfurt (Germany) | 1–2 | (Spain) Real Madrid | Frankfurt |
| 19:00 CEST | Anyomi 45' | Report | Angeldahl 13'; Bruun 35' | Stadium: Stadion am Brentanobad; Attendance: 5,569; Referee: Kirsty Dowle |

| 18 September 2025 Second leg | Real Madrid (Spain) | 3–0 (5–1 agg.) | (Germany) Eintracht Frankfurt | Madrid |
| 20:00 CEST | Feller 9'; Bruun 35'; Caicedo 60' | Report | | Stadium: Alfredo Di Stéfano; Attendance: 1,204; Referee: Ivana Martinčić |

==== League phase ====
The league phase draw was held on 19 September 2025

Source: UEFA

| Round | 1 | 2 | 3 | 4 | 5 | 6 |
|---|---|---|---|---|---|---|
| Ground | H | A | H | A | H | A |
| Result | W | W | D | L | W | D |
| Position | 3 | 3 | 4 | 6 | 5 | 7 |

Updated to match(es) played on 15 April 2026. Source: UEFA
A = Away; H = Home; W = Win; D = Draw; L = Loss

| 8 October 2025 1 | Real Madrid | 6–2 | AS Roma | Madrid |
| 18:45 CEST | Redondo 6', 42'; Weir 22', 59'; Lakrar 13'; Navarro 73' | Report | Viens 16'; Haavi 35' | Stadium: Alfredo Di Stéfano Stadium; Attendance: 1,440; Referee: Iuliana Demetrescu (Romania) |

| 16 October 2025 2 | Paris Saint-Germain | 1–2 | Real Madrid | Paris |
| 21:00 CEST | Ajibade 58' | Report | Feller 29'; Redondo 47' | Stadium: Campus PSG; Attendance: 480; Referee: Michaela Pachtová (Czech Republic) |

| 11 November 2025 3 | Real Madrid | 1–1 | Paris FC | Madrid |
| 21:00 CEST | Weir 90+8' | Report | Azzaro 41' (pen.) | Stadium: Alfredo Di Stéfano Stadium; Attendance: 1,179; Referee: Frida Klarlund (Denmark) |

| 19 November 2025 4 | Arsenal | 2–1 | Real Madrid | London |
| 21:00 CEST | Russo 53', 67' | Report | Weir 43' | Stadium: Emirates Stadium; Attendance: 3,132; Referee: Silvia Gasperotti (Italy) |

| 9 December 2025 5 | Real Madrid | 2–0 | VfL Wolfsburg | Alfredo Di Stéfano, Madrid |
| 21:00 | Méndez 19'; Caicedo 67' | Report | | Referee: Kirsty Dowle (England) |

| 17 December 2025 6 | Twente | 1–1 | Real Madrid | De Grolsch Veste, Enschede |
| 21:00 | Ravensbergen 46' | Report | Däbritz 90+6' | Attendance: 3,650; Referee: Lotta Vuorio |

==== Knockout phase ====
| 11 February 2026 First round | Paris FC (France) | 2–3 | (Spain) Real Madrid | Stade Charléty, Paris |
| 21:00 | Korošec 10'; Ma. Mendy 89' | Report | Weir 39'; Athenea 45'; Caicedo 83' | Attendance: 6,757; Referee: Ivana Martinčić (Croatia) |

| 18 February 2026 Second round | Real Madrid (Spain) | 2–0 (5–2 agg.) | (France) Paris FC | Alfredo Di Stéfano, Madrid |
| 18:45 | Feller 54'; N'Dongala 67' (o.g.) | Report | | Attendance: 1,558; Referee: Iuliana Demetrescu (Romania) |

==== Quarter–finals ====
| 25 March 2026 First round | Real Madrid (Spain) | 2–6 | (Spain) Barcelona | Alfredo Di Stéfano, Madrid |
| 18:45 | Caicedo 30', 66' | Report | Pajor 6', 57'; Brugts 13'; Paredes 32'; López 64'; Putellas 89' (pen.) | Attendance: 4,203; Referee: Maria Sole Ferrieri Caputi (Italy) |

| 2 April 2026 Second round | Barcelona (Spain) | 6–0 (12–2 agg.) | (Spain) Real Madrid | Camp Nou, Barcelona |
| 18:45 | Putellas 8'; Graham Hansen 15', 55'; Paredes 27'; Pajor 34'; Brugts 74' | Report | | Attendance: 60,067; Referee: Stéphanie Frappart (France) |
