= Misa Rodríguez =

Spanish footballer

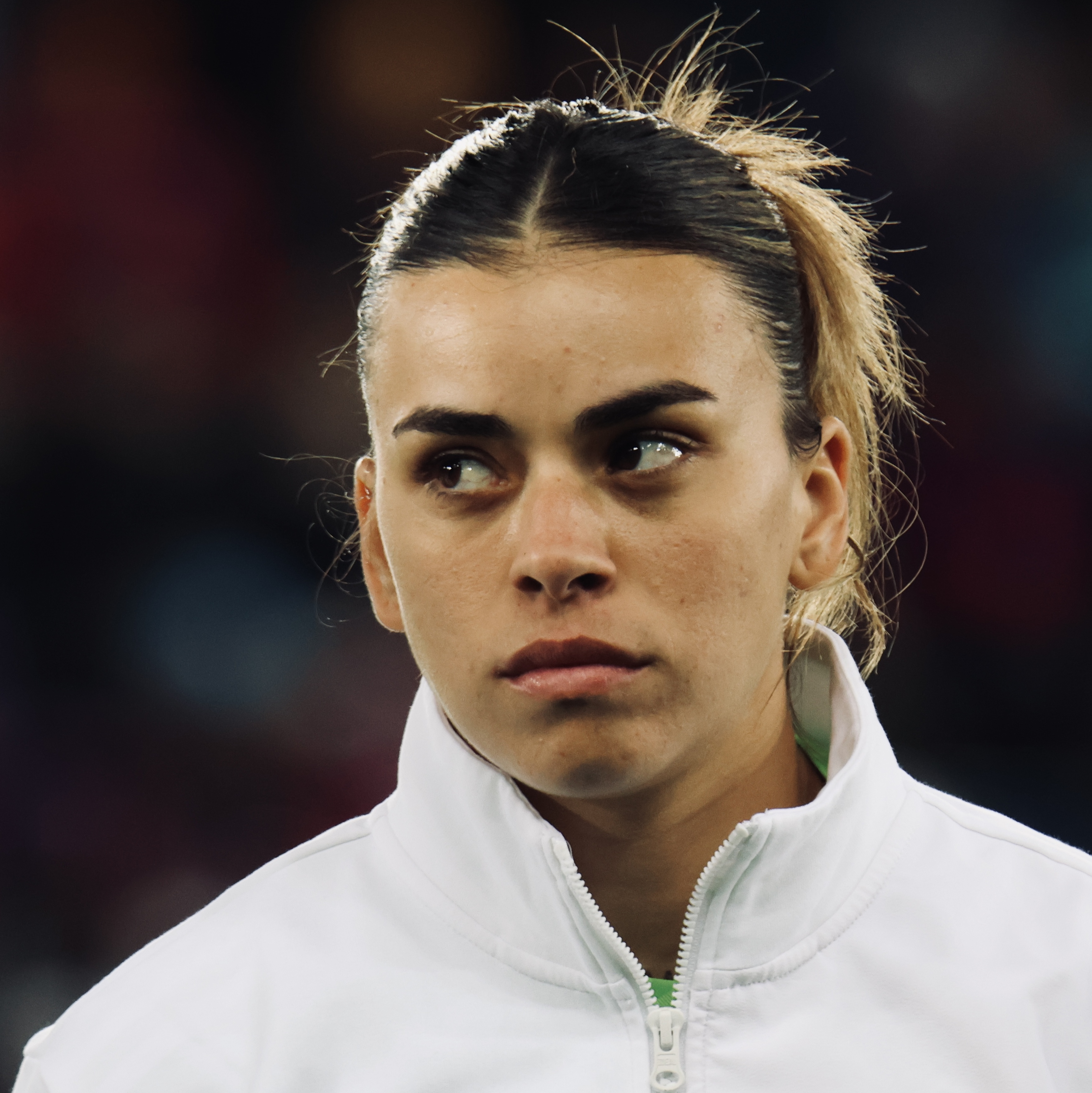
- Rodríguez with Real Madrid in 2023.

Personal information
- Full name: María Isabel Rodríguez Rivero
- Date of birth: 22 July 1999 (age 27)
- Place of birth: Las Palmas, Spain
- Height: 1.73 m (5 ft 8 in)
- Position: Goalkeeper

Team information
- Current team: Arsenal
- Number: 16

Youth career
- 2013–2017: CD Femarguín

Senior career*
Years	Team	Apps	(Gls)
2017–2019	Atlético de Madrid	1	(0)
2019–2020	Deportivo La Coruña	12	(0)
2020–2026	Real Madrid	152	(0)
2026–	Arsenal	8	(0)

International career^{‡}
2018–2019	Spain U19	5	(0)
2021–	Spain	26	(0)
Medal record
Women's football
Representing Spain
FIFA Women's World Cup
Winner	2023 Australia–New Zealand
UEFA Women's Nations League
Winner	2024 France–Netherlands–Spain
UEFA Women's Under-19 Championship
Winner	2018 Switzerland
- * Club domestic league appearances and goals as of 23:10, 15 November 2026 (UTC) ‡ National team caps and goals as of 22:00, 17 October 2026 (UTC)

María Isabel "Misa" Rodríguez Rivero (born 22 July 1999) is a Spanish professional footballer who plays as a goalkeeper for Women's Super League side Arsenal and the Spain national team. She has previously played for and captained Liga F club Real Madrid. She won the Zamora Trophy in 2020–21 season, conceding 0.93 goals per game.

== Club career ==
Misa Rodríguez, who originally performed rhythmic gymnastics as a child, began her football career in the youth of CD Yoñé La Garita in her hometown of Telde at the time, where she played up front. In 2013, she went to CD Femarguín, a club from Arguineguín, and moved to the goalkeeper position. Finally, with CD Femarguín, she made her adult debut in the 2016–17 season in the Segunda División, the second division in Spanish football.

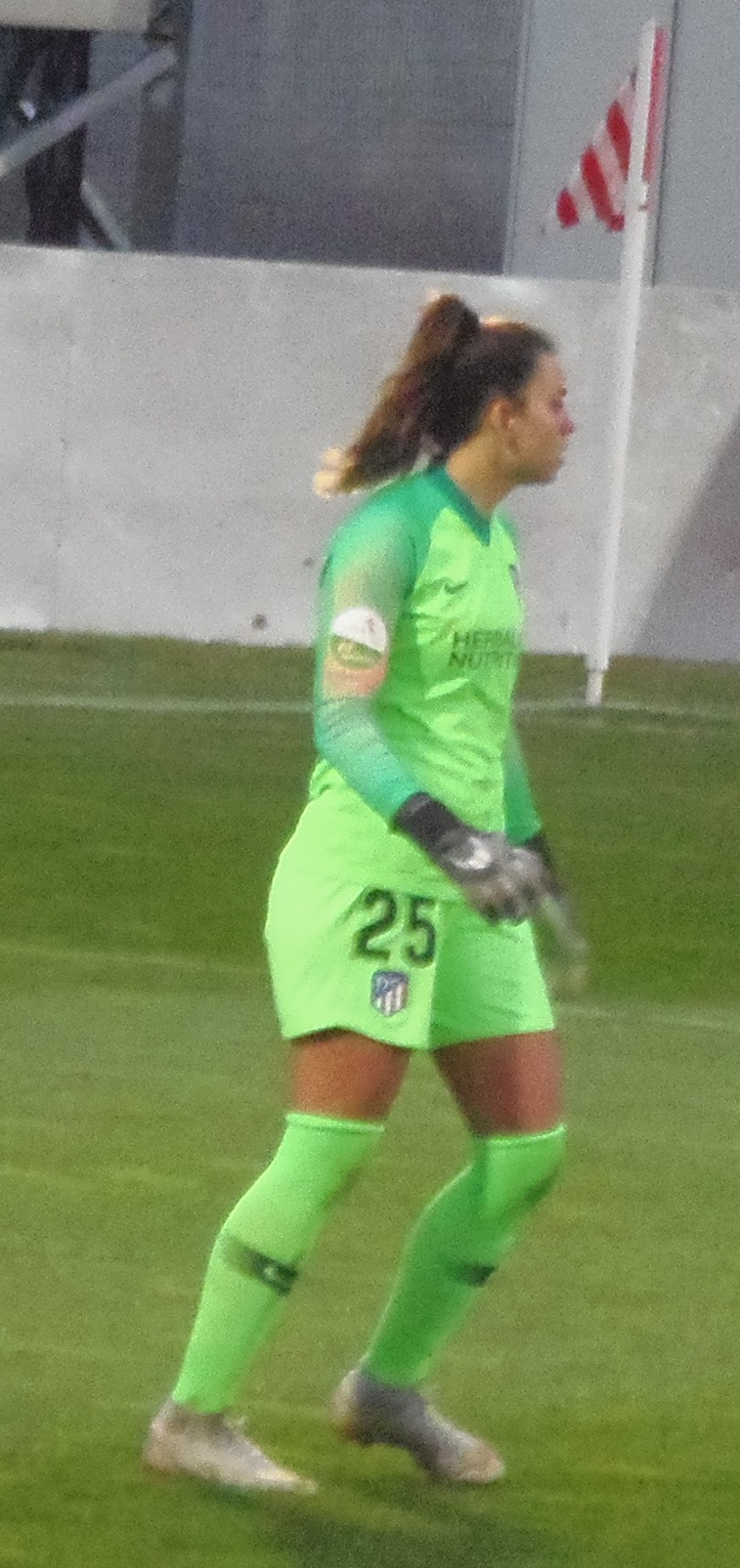
Misa with Atlético Madrid in 2018

Her good performances drew the attention of the top Spanish club Atlético Madrid and they signed her in February 2017. In the capitals she played in the beginning mostly with the B team in the second division, while she served primarily as a substitute goalkeeper in the A squad. Misa Rodríguez made her first-team debut on 25 November 2018 in the Copa de la Reina in a 4–2 win over Malaga FC. She made her debut in the league on 23 February 2019, when she replaced Lola Gallardo in the 46th minute in a 6–1 win against Fundación Albacete. However, since she was unable to assert herself against first-choice goalkeeper Lola Gallardo during her time at Atlético Madrid, Misa Rodríguez switched to the newly promoted team in the Primera División Deportivo de La Coruña in the summer of 2019. She fared much better here, sharing goal-scoring position with Esther Sullastres but ultimately making 12 appearances in 21 games played in the 2019–20 season. Her team surprised on their first appearance in the top Spanish league with a fourth place in the season, which was shortened due to the COVID-19 pandemic.

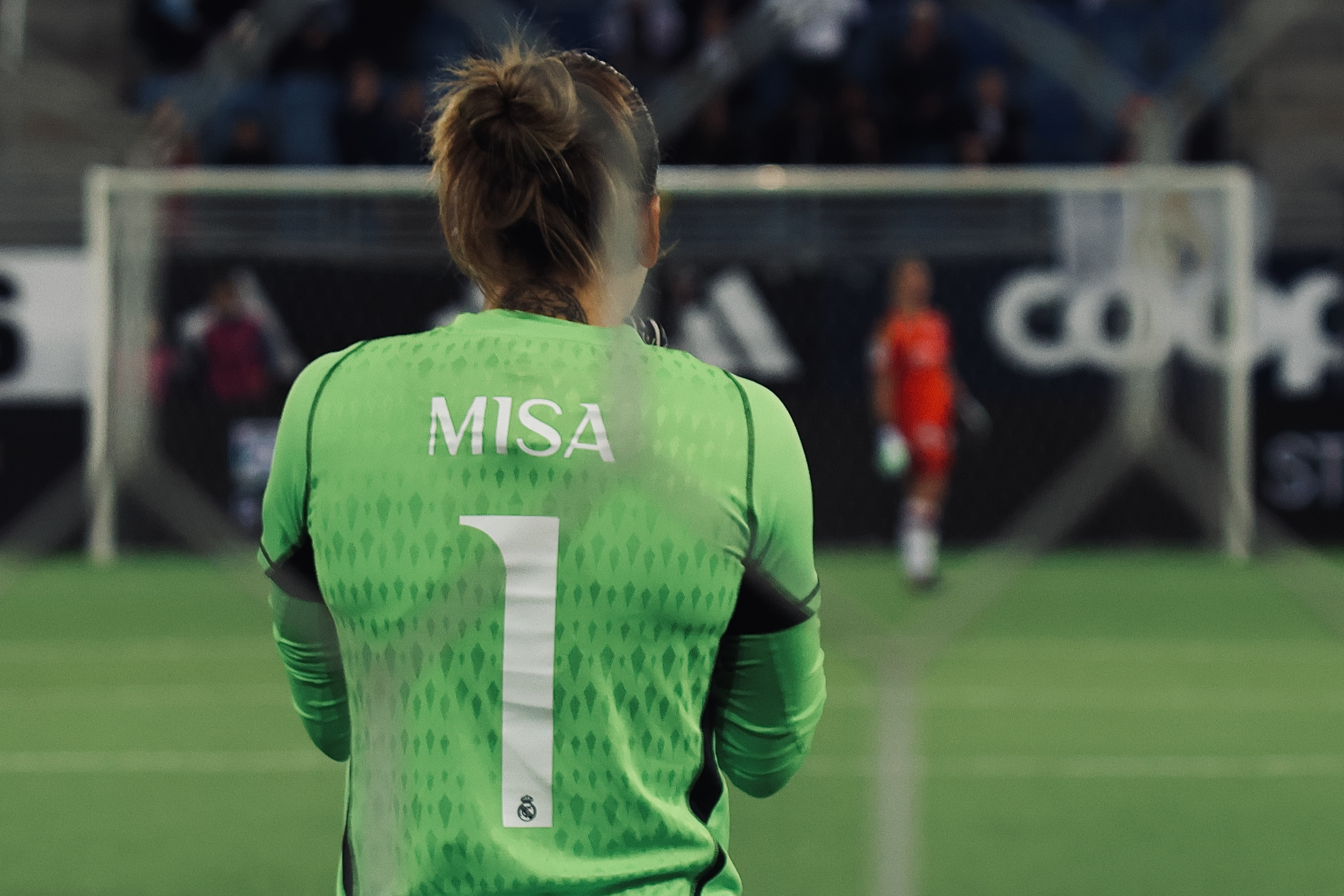
Misa with Real Madrid in 2023

=== Real Madrid ===
Rodríguez joined newly established Real Madrid Femenino at the beginning of 2020–21 season. In the same season, she won the Zamora trophy awarded to the goalkeeper with the lowest "goals-to-games" ratio in the Spanish league. On 20 January 2026, she made her 200th appearance for the Merengues in a 3–1 victory over Atlético Madrid during the Supercopa de España, becoming Real Madrid's all-time most-capped player. She departed from the club at the end of the 2025–26 season.

=== Arsenal ===
On 22 July 2026, it was announced that Rodríguez had signed a permanent deal with Women's Super League club Arsenal on a free transfer, after leaving Real Madrid at the end of the 2025–26 season. Making her the teams sixth signing of the summer transfer window.

== International career ==
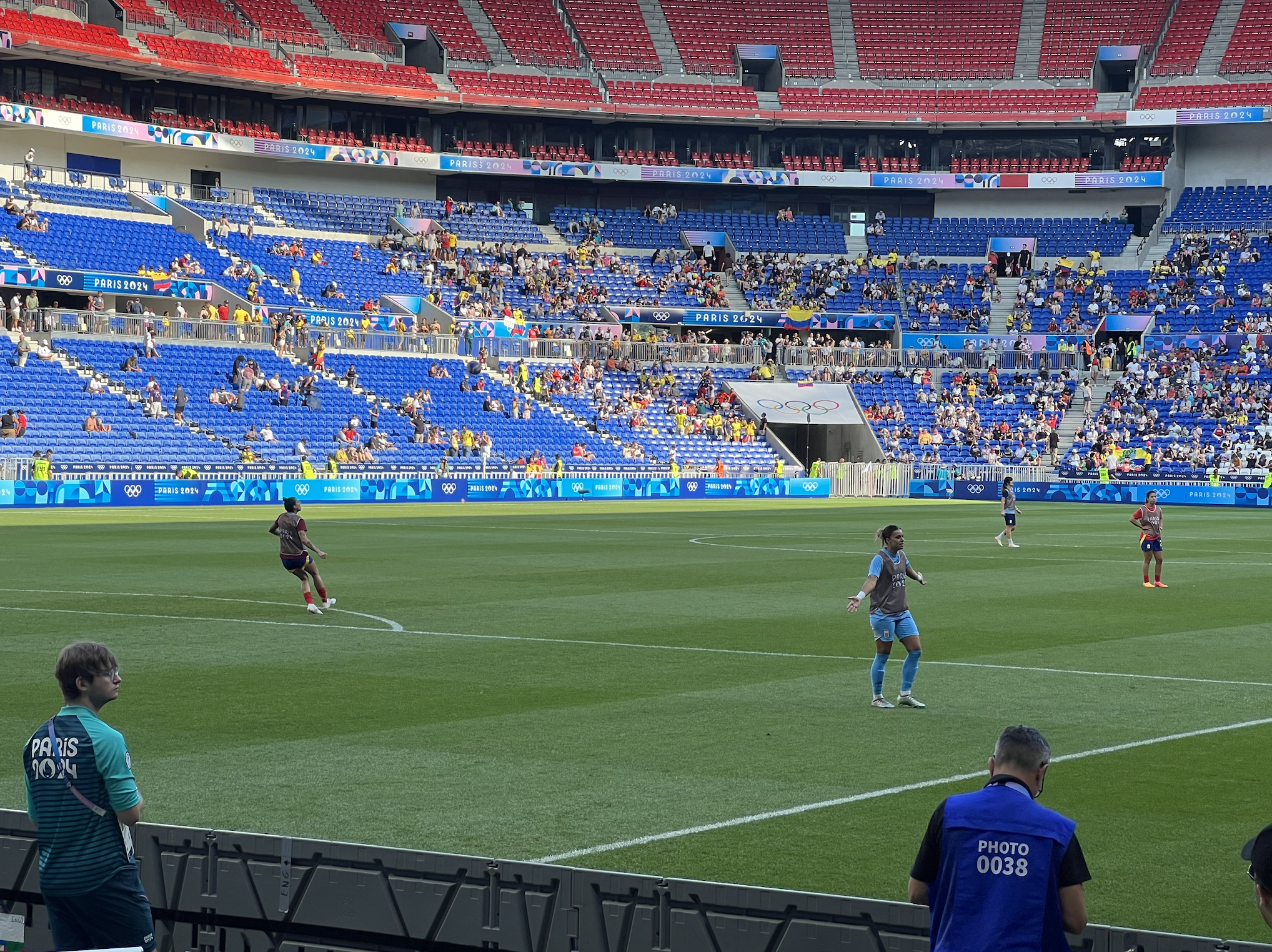
Rodriguez staying warm halfway through Spain's quarterfinal against Colombia at the 2024 Olympics.

Misa Rodríguez made her debut for the U-19 national team in a match against Azerbaijan on 17 September 2016 in the course of qualifying for the U-19 European Championship. In addition to two appearances in qualifying, she also played the final group game against Scotland, which the Iberians decided 1-0 for themselves. Her team won the European title with a 3–2 win over France in the final. A year later she was in Spain's squad for the finals of the U-20 World Cup. Her team reached the final where they lost 3–1 to Japan, but Misa Rodríguez never played in the tournament. She made three appearances in qualifying for the 2019 U-19 European Championship, one in the first round and two more in the elite round, but was not nominated for the final squad that ultimately successfully defended the title.

Misa Rodríguez received her first call-up to the senior national team for the qualifier for the Euro 2022 against Moldova on 19 September 2020, but ultimately did not play. After several games on the bench, she made her national team debut against Azerbaijan on 18 February 2021, also in the European Championship qualifier.

== Career statistics ==
=== Club ===
As of match played 19 November 2026

Appearances and goals by club, season and competition
Club	Season	League			National cup (Note: Includes Copa de la Reina)		Continental		Other		Total	
Club	Season	Division	Apps	Goals	Apps	Goals	Apps	Goals	Apps	Goals	Apps	Goals
Atlético Madrid	2017–18	Primera División	0	0	0	0	—		—		0	0
Atlético Madrid	2018–19	Primera División	1	0	1	0	0	0	—		2	0
Atlético Madrid	Total		1	0	1	0	0	0	—		2	0
Deportivo de La Coruña	2019–20	Primera División	12	0	0	0	—		—		12	0
Real Madrid	2020–21	Primera División	32	0	0	0	—		—		32	0
Real Madrid	2021–22	Primera División	27	0	2	0	9 (Note: Appearances in UEFA Women's Champions League)	0	1 (Note: Appearance(s) in Supercopa de España)	0	39	0
Real Madrid	2022–23	Liga F	26	0	3	0	9	0	1	0	39	0
Real Madrid	2023–24	Liga F	25	0	2	0	6	0	1	0	34	0
Real Madrid	2024–25	Liga F	24	0	3	0	10	0	2	0	39	0
Real Madrid	2025–26	Liga F	19	0	2	0	9	0	2	0	32	0
Real Madrid	Total		153	0	12	0	43	0	7	0	215	0
Arsenal	2026–27	WSL	8	0	0	0	4	0	—		12	0
Career total			174	0	13	0	46	0	8	0	241	0

=== International ===
As of match played 13 October 2026

Appearances and goals by national team and year
National team	Year	Apps	Goals
Spain	2021	4	0
Spain	2022	5	0
Spain	2023	10	0
Spain	2024	5	0
Spain	2026	2	0
Total		26	0

== Honours ==
Atletico de Madrid

- Primera División: 2016–2017, 2017–2018, 2018–2019
- Copa de la Reina runner-up: 2018, 2019

Spain U19

- U19 European Championship: 2018

Spain

- FIFA Women's World Cup: 2023
- UEFA Women's Nations League: 2023–24

Individual

- Zamora Trophy: 2020–2021, 2022–23
