= Teresa Abelleira =

Spanish footballer (born 2000)

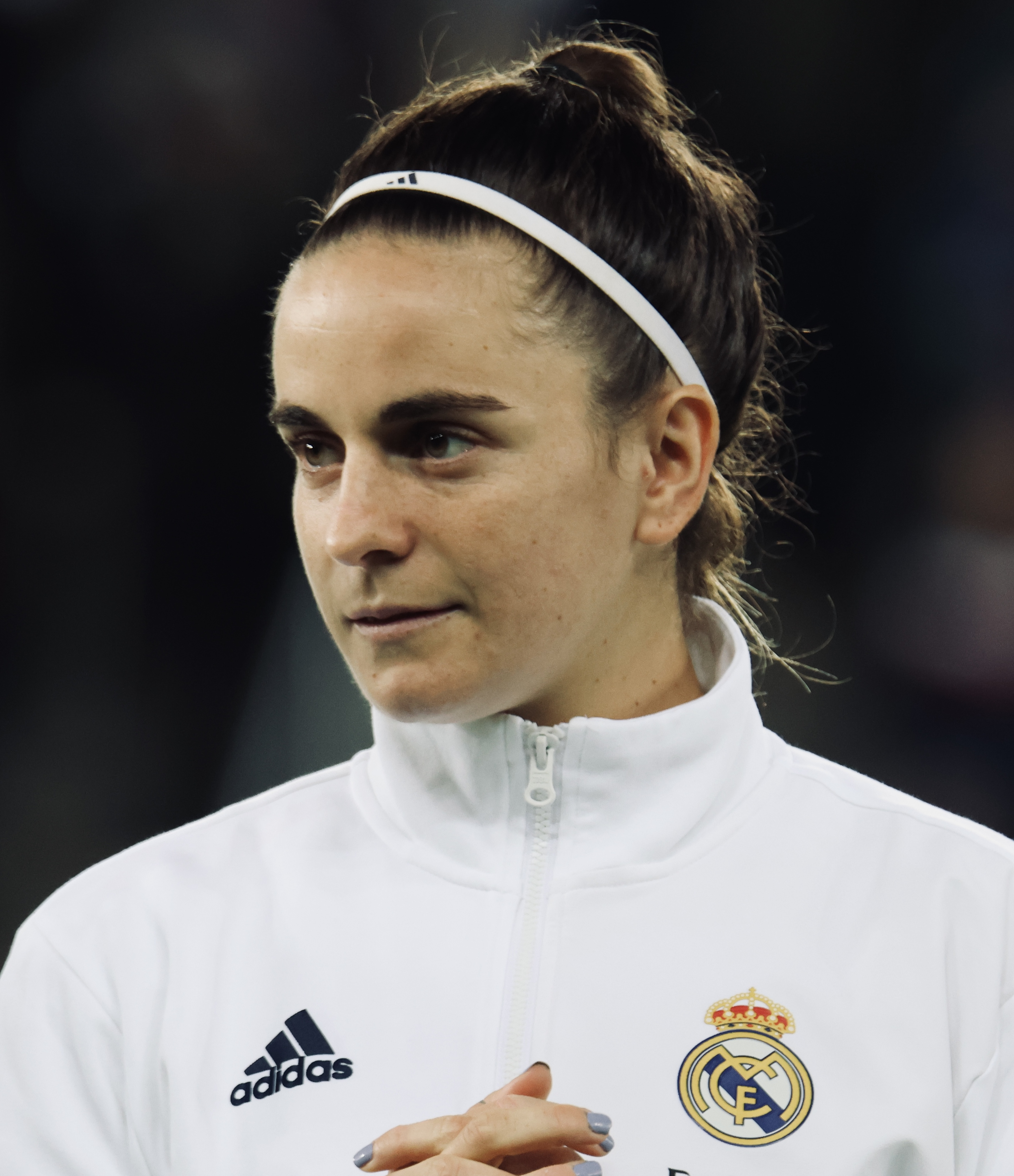
- Abelleira with Real Madrid in 2023

Personal information
- Full name: Teresa José Abelleira Dueñas
- Date of birth: 9 January 2000 (age 26)
- Place of birth: Pontevedra, Spain
- Height: 1.59 m (5 ft 3 in)
- Position: Midfielder

Team information
- Current team: Atletico Madrid

Youth career
- CD Lérez

Senior career*
Years	Team	Apps	(Gls)
2016–2020	Deportivo La Coruña	27	(10)
2020–2026	Real Madrid	126	(10)
2026–	Atletico Madrid		

International career^{‡}
2016	Galicia	1	(0)
2017	Spain U17	4	(0)
2017–2019	Spain U19	17	(3)
2020–2025	Spain	44	(3)
2022	Spain U23	1	(0)
Medal record
Women's football
Representing Spain
FIFA Women's World Cup
Winner	2023 Australia–New Zealand
UEFA Women's Nations League
Winner	2024 France–Netherlands–Spain
UEFA Women's Under-19 Championship
Winner	2018 Switzerland
UEFA Women's Under-17 Championship
Runner-up	2016 Belarus
- * Club domestic league appearances and goals as of 00:50, 20 March 2025 (UTC) ‡ National team caps and goals as of 00:50, 20 March 2025 (UTC)

Teresa José Abelleira Dueñas (born 9 January 2000) is a Spanish professional footballer who plays as a midfielder for the Spain national team. She has previously played for Liga F clubs Deportivo Abanca and Real Madrid.

== Youth career ==
Abelleira began playing football as a child with her father and her brother. Besides playing football, Abelleira also played futsal while growing up. She became Spanish champion at the age of 16 with the club Poio Pescamar. Before joining Deportivo Abanca, she played for CD Lérez.

== Club career ==
=== Deportivo ===
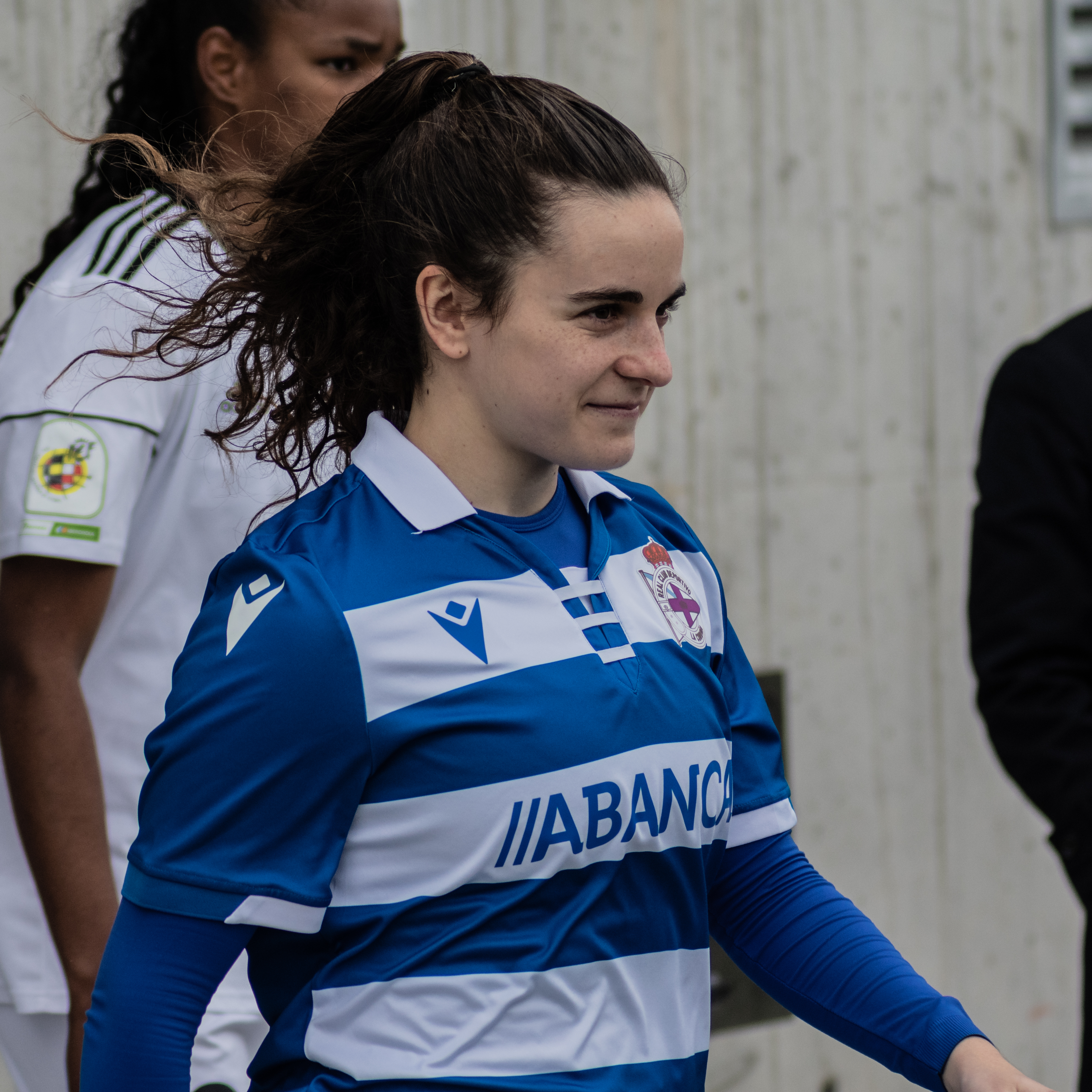
Abelleira with Deportivo Abanca in 2020

In 2016, after the recovery of the women's club section, Abelleira joined Deportivo Abanca of the Segunda División. On 6 August 2016, alongside teammate Raquel Béjar, she became the first female professional footballer in Galicia. On 4 September 2016, she made her debut in a draw against Oviedo Moderno.

After winning the Segunda División title, Deportivo Abanca were promoted to Primera División. Abelleira made her Primera División debut on 8 September 2019 in a 3–1 win against RCD Espanyol. She was named MVP of matchweek 7.

=== Real Madrid ===
In 2020, Abelleira joined the newly established Real Madrid, where she quickly became an important young player for the club. Over the years, she developed into one of Real Madrid’s most influential players. However, during the 2025–26 season, she was unable to make any appearances due to injury. She served as the team’s second captain for the 2025–26 season and has made over 170 appearances for the club. On 12 June 2026, Real Madrid announced that Abelleira would depart the club upon the expiration of her contract, ending a six-year tenure with the team.

== International career ==
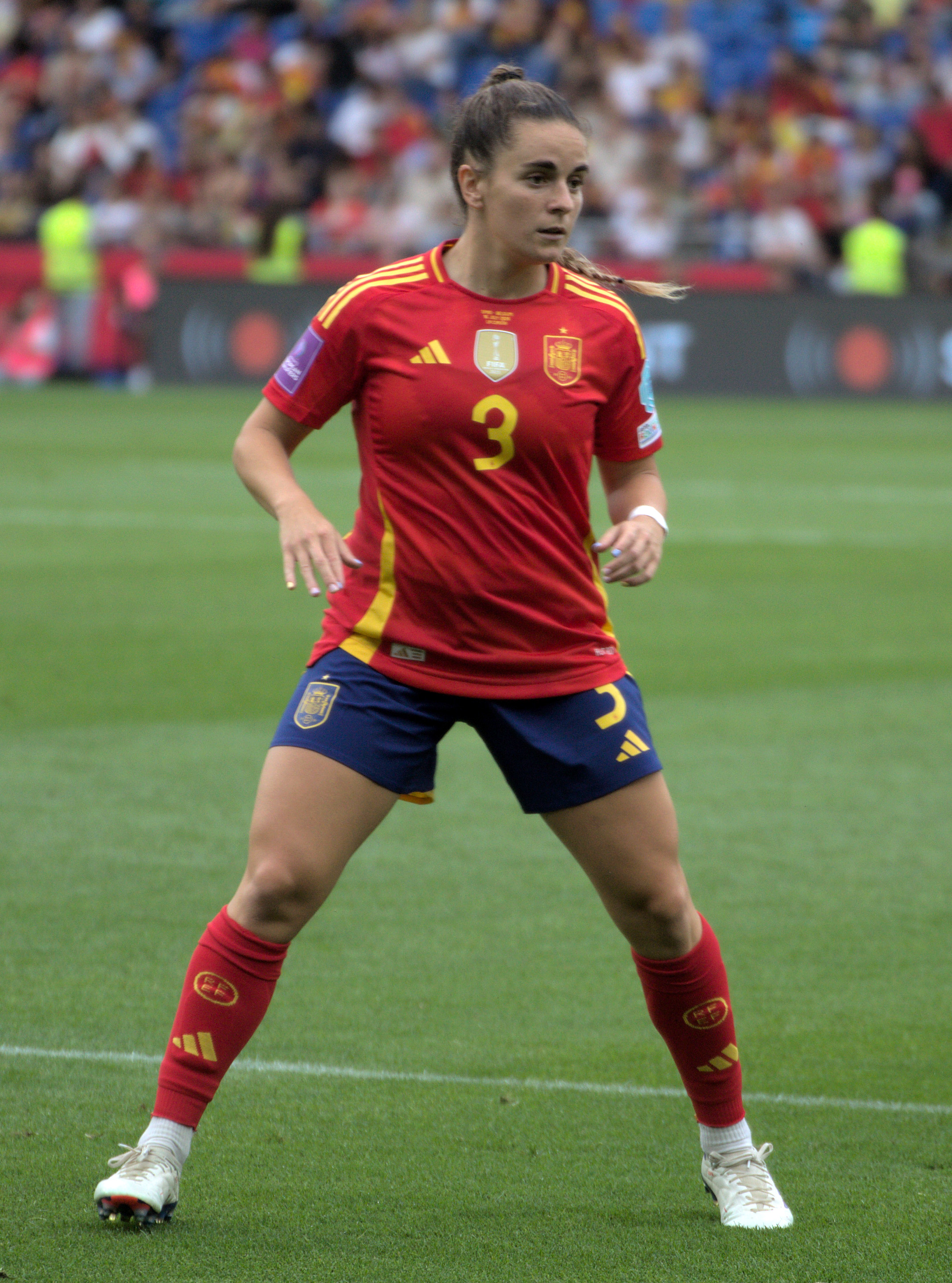
Abelleira with Spain in 2024

Abelleira was called into the Spain U17 squad for the 2016 UEFA Under-17 Championship played in Belarus. Spain finished runners-up in the competition.

She also played at the 2018 UEFA Under-19 Championship, where she became a European champion.

== Personal life ==
Abelleira was born on 9 January 2000 in Pontevedra, Galicia, to former footballer and coach José Emiliano "Milo" Abelleira Solla, and Teté Dueñas, as the youngest of three siblings. Abelleira is the godmother of her niece.

Her paternal family was a traditional baking dynasty that ran the Abelleira bakery, one of the oldest businesses in Pontevedra and oldest bakeries in Spain at the time it closed in 2023, having an impact on Pontevedra cuisine, as well as being closely connected to football. Her father and brother Tomás have both played for Pontevedra CF, with Milo also having coached the club. Her grandfather's brother, Benigno Abelleira, is president and an original member of the Peña da Boina, the oldest official fan club of Pontevedra CF, and was a good friend of Camilo José Cela.

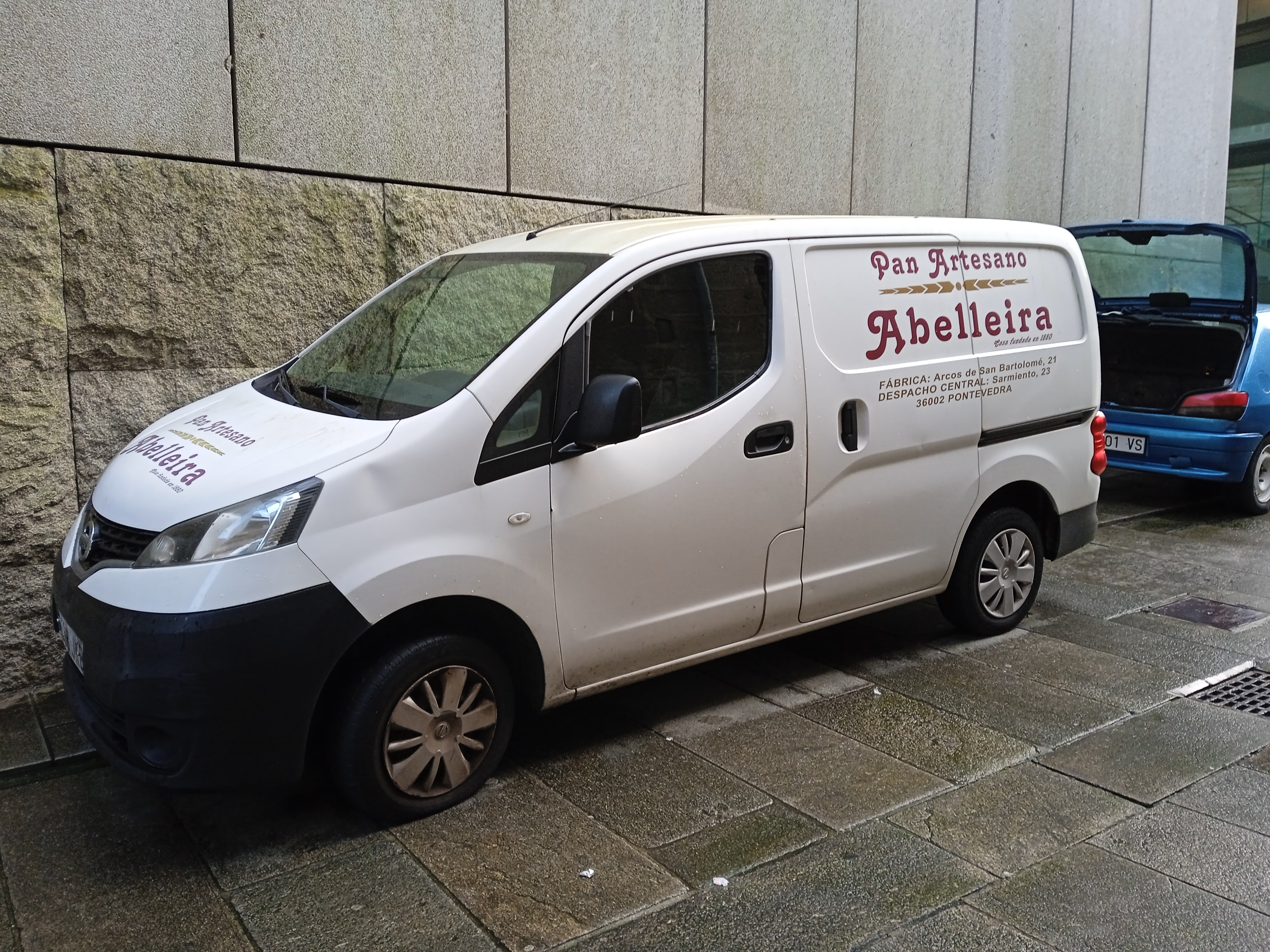
A van advertising the Abelleira family bakery

As of 2019, Abelleira was in a relationship with her former teammate Patricia Curbelo; when the couple posted about each other on social media, they received homophobic abuse, which they then shared and said they would continue to fight.

== Career statistics ==
No.	Date	Venue	Opponent	Score	Result	Competition
1.	11 April 2023	Estadi Municipal de Can Misses, Ibiza, Spain	China	1–0	3–0	Friendly
2.	26 July 2023	Eden Park, Auckland, New Zealand	Zambia	1–0	5–0	2023 FIFA Women's World Cup
3.	16 July 2024	Estadio Riazor, A Coruña, Spain	Belgium	2–0	2–0	UEFA Euro 2025 qualifying

== Honours ==
=== Football ===
Deportivo La Coruña

- Segunda División: 2018–19

Spain

- FIFA Women's World Cup: 2023
- UEFA Women's Nations League: 2023–24
- UEFA Women's Under-17 Championship runner-up: 2016
- UEFA Women's Under-19 Championship: 2018

=== Futsal ===
- Spanish Futsal Championship U16: 2016
- Galician Futsal Championship U16: 2016
