= Rocío Gálvez =

Spanish footballer

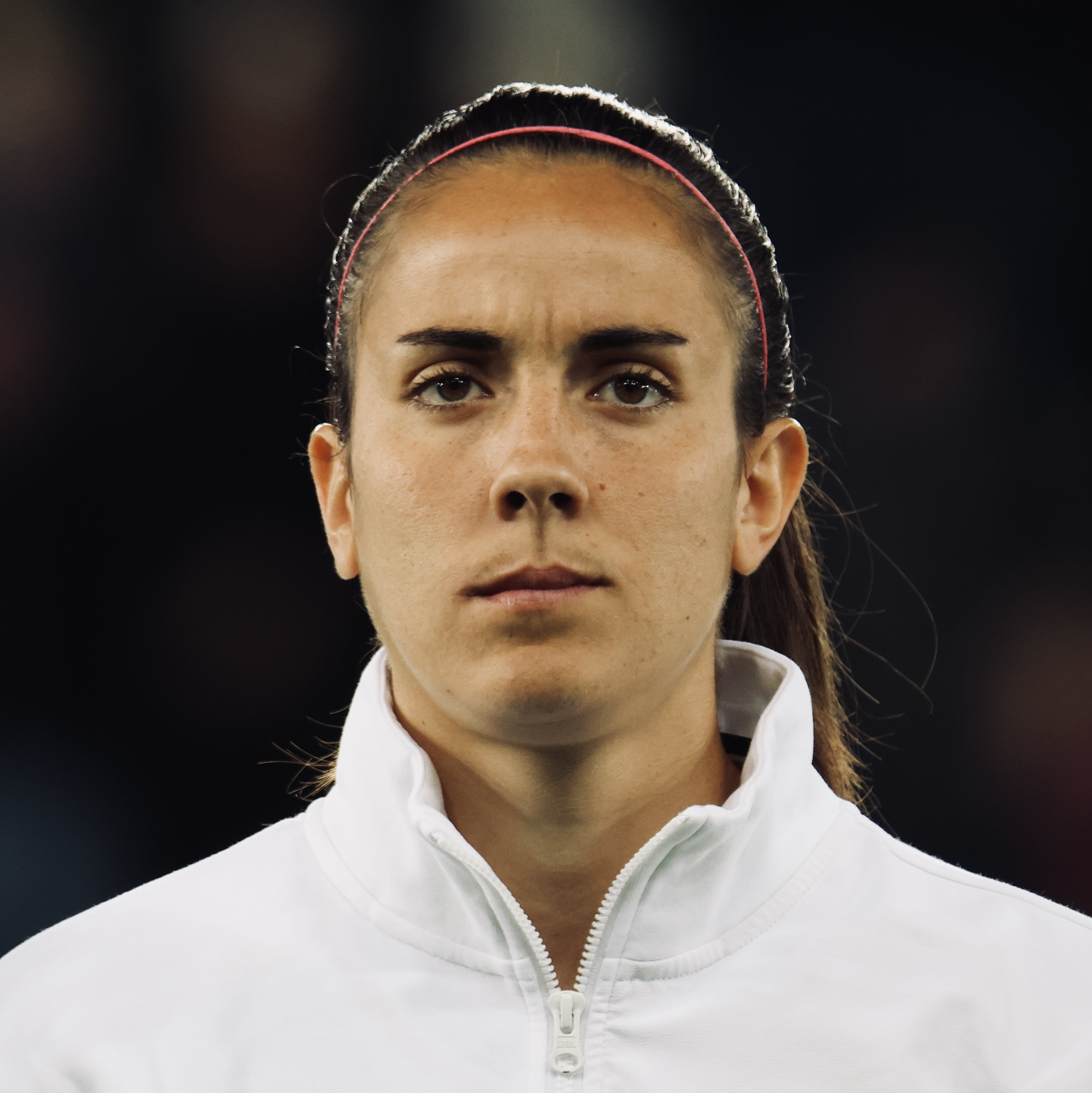
- Gálvez with Real Madrid in 2023

Personal information
- Full name: Rocío Gálvez Luna
- Date of birth: 15 April 1997 (age 29)
- Place of birth: Córdoba, Spain
- Height: 1.72 m (5 ft 8 in)
- Position: Centre back

Team information
- Current team: Juárez
- Number: 24

Senior career*
| Years | Team | Apps | (Gls) |
| 2012–2013 | Sevilla B | | |
| 2013–2014 | Betis | | |
| 2014–2017 | Atlético de Madrid | 42 | (5) |
| 2017–2019 | Betis | 56 | (6) |
| 2019–2021 | Levante | 46 | (2) |
| 2021–2026 | Real Madrid | 100 | (10) |
| 2026– | Juárez | 0 | (0) |

International career^{‡}
| 2013–2014 | Spain U17 | 15 | (1) |
| 2015 | Spain U19 | 9 | (1) |
| 2016 | Spain U20 | 2 | (0) |
| 2018–2023 | Spain | 12 | (0) |
Medal record
Women's football
Representing Spain
FIFA Women's World Cup
| Winner | 2023 Australia–New Zealand |
UEFA Women's Under-19 Championship
| Runner-up | 2015 Israel |
UEFA Women's Under-17 Championship
| Runner-up | 2014 England |
- * Club domestic league appearances and goals as of 20:18, 15 June 2026 (UTC) ‡ National team caps and goals as of 23:54, 1 July 2024 (UTC)

Rocío Gálvez Luna (born 15 April 1997) is a Spanish professional footballer who plays as a centre back for Liga MX Femenil club FC Juárez and the Spain national team.

== Club career ==
Rocío Gálvez started her career at the age of eleven with Deportivo Córdoba. In 2011 she moved to the youth team at Sevilla FC and was promoted to the club's B team for the 2012/13 season. During that season, on 17 March 2013, she made her first-team debut in a league game against Valencia CF.

She then moved to city rivals Betis Sevilla and competed with them in the 2013/14 Segunda División. In the summer of 2014, Atlético Madrid signed her. In the 2014/15 season, she and her team finished second in the championship, qualifying for the first time for the UEFA Champions League, where they lost to eventual winners Olympique Lyon in the round of 16. In April 2016, she tore a cruciate ligament and ruptured the meniscus in her right knee and had to have an operation. Atlético Madrid won the Spanish Cup that season. She made her return in October this year in a league match against her former club Betis Sevilla but was sidelined for the rest of the season after suffering another knee injury on 16 November at the U-20 World Cup. Her team won the championship that season.

The recovered Gálvez then went on loan to Betis Sevilla, who had meanwhile been promoted to the Primera División, and ended the league as a regular in sixth place. After completing the loan deal, she stayed at Betis for one more season before returning to Levante UD in 2019. She finished third in the league with the Valencia club in both 2019/20 and 2020/21, while UD Levante made the 2021 cup final but lost to FC Barcelona.

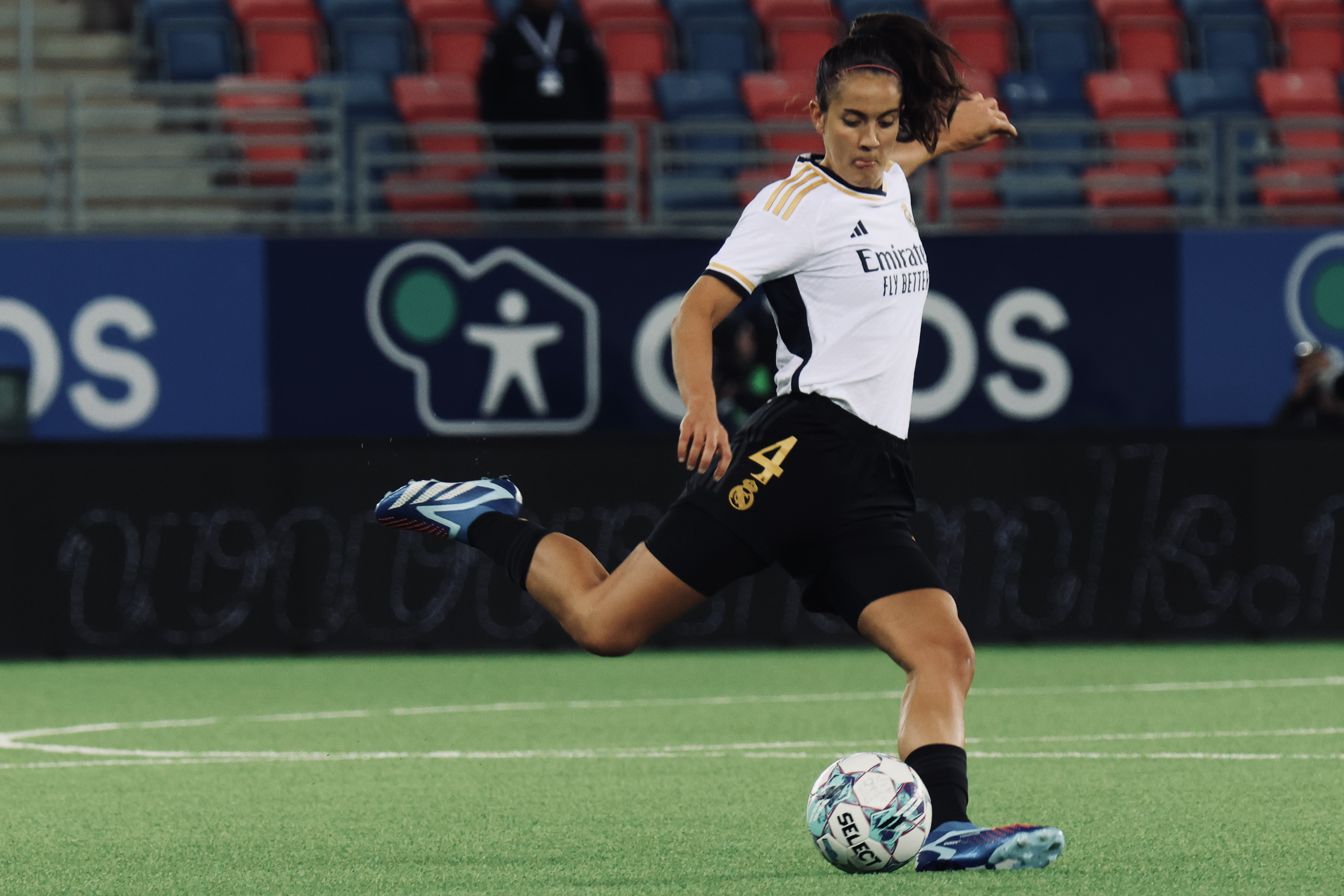
Gálvez with Real Madrid in 2023

In the summer of 2021, Gálvez joined Real Madrid. She quickly established herself as an important player for the club and, by the 2025–26 season, had made over 130 appearances for Real Madrid, serving as the team's third captain. On 15 June 2026, Real Madrid announced the departure of Gálvez after five years.

== International career ==
Rocío Gálvez competed on the Spain U-17 team at the Euro 2013, where she finished third with her team. At the Euro 2014, which actually took place at the end of 2013, she reached the final with Spain and lost there on penalties to Germany. In 2014, Rocío Gálvez was again in the finals squad at the U-17 World Cup, reached the final with her national squad, but lost 2–0 to Japan. With the U-19s she again played in the final of the 2015 European Championship, this time Spain lost 3–1 to Sweden. At the 2016 U-20 World Cup Rocío Gálvez was back in the squad for the Spaniards, but injured her knee in the second group game and was unable to take part in the further course of the tournament.

Rocío Gálvez made her senior debut on 5 March 2018 at the Cyprus Cup. The Spaniards ultimately won the title by beating Italy 2–0 in the final.

== Honours ==
Atlético de Madrid

- Primera División: 2016–17
- Copa de la Reina de Fútbol: 2016

Spain (youth)

- U-17 European Championship runner-up: 2014
- U-19 European Championship runner-up: 2015

Spain

- FIFA Women's World Cup: 2023
- Cyprus Cup: 2018
