= Claudia Florentino =

Spanish footballer (born 1998)

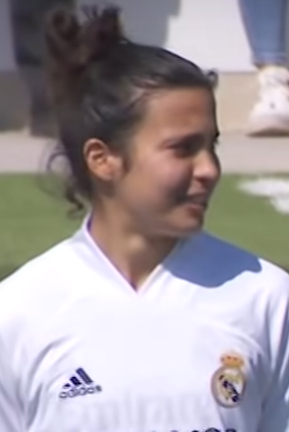

Personal information
- Full name: Claudia Florentino Vivó
- Date of birth: 10 March 1998 (age 28)
- Place of birth: Valencia, Spain
- Height: 1.64 m (5 ft 5 in)
- Position: Centre back

Team information
- Current team: Real Sociedad
- Number: 2

Youth career
- 2007–2009: Deportivo Rambleta
- 2009–2014: Valencia

Senior career*
Years	Team	Apps	(Gls)
2014–2017	Valencia	11	(0)
2017–2020	Fundación Albacete	71	(1)
2020–2023	Real Madrid	39	(0)
2023–2025	Valencia	59	(1)
2025–	Real Sociedad	27	(0)
- * Club domestic league appearances and goals as of 01:04, 15 April 2024 (UTC)

Claudia Florentino Vivó (born 10 March 1998) is a Spanish professional footballer who plays as a centre back for Liga F club Real Sociedad.

== Club career ==
Claudia Florentino started playing football at Deportivo La Rambleta CF, a small club from Valencia. In 2009 she moved to Valencia CF. She made her debut in the first team and in the Primera División at the end of the 2014/15 season. In the following two seasons she made another ten appearances in the first division and mostly came from the bench, but at the same time she also played in the club's B team in the second division. In the summer of 2017, Florentino moved to Fundación Albacete, within the first division, where she was able to secure a regular place in central defense right from the start. The team only finished the 2018/19 season in 16th and last place and was relegated to the second division. In the 2019/20 season, which was shortened by the COVID-19 pandemic, Florentino played all 21 games in full, and her team finished in third place in the South Group of the second division.

Her good performances in defense were noticed, and Claudia Florentino signed for Real Madrid's newly founded women's team in September 2020. During her first season, alongside Ivana Andrés and Babett Peter, she played 20 games and reached second place with her club. Florentino made her debut in the Champions League on October 6, 2021 against Zhytlobud-1 Kharkiv. Over the course of the season she made five appearances in continental competition and reached the quarter-finals with Real Madrid in the club's first participation. In the 2022/23 season she only made eight appearances in the league and one each in the cup and the Champions League.

In April 2022, she renewed her contract with Real Madrid until 2023. Following the season, Claudia Florentino left Real Madrid and signed for her former club Valencia.
