= 2021–22 FC Barcelona Femení B season =

Barcelona Femení B
2021–22 season
- President: Joan Laporta
- Head coach: Òscar Belis
- Stadium: Ciutat Esportiva Joan Gamper
- Segunda División Pro: 5th - Group North
- Top goalscorer: Rocío García (8)
- Biggest win: Barcelona B 4–0 Atlético Madrid B
| Home colours | Away colours |
- All statistics correct as of 3 May 2022.

The 2021–22 season was the 19th season for FC Barcelona Femení B, and their 3rd season in the new format of Segunda División Pro aka Reto Iberdrola.

== Players ==
=== Current squad ===
As of 27 March 2022

Note: Flags indicate national team as defined under FIFA eligibility rules; some limited exceptions apply. Players may hold more than one non-FIFA nationality.

| No. | Pos. | Nation | Player |
|---|---|---|---|
| 1 | GK | ESP | Laura Coronado |
| 2 | DF | ESP | Martina Fernández |
| 3 | DF | ESP | Clara Rodríguez |
| 4 | MF | ESP | Laura Lobo |
| 5 | DF | ESP | María Molina (3rd captain) |
| 6 | MF | ESP | Ariadna Mingueza (vice-captain) |
| 7 | FW | BUL | Viky Adrianova |
| 8 | MF | ESP | Alba Caño |
| 9 | FW | ESP | Claudia Riumalló |
| 10 | FW | ESP | Ornella Vignola |
| 11 | FW | ESP | Sara Ismael (captain) |
| 12 | MF | ESP | Marta Llopis |

| No. | Pos. | Nation | Player |
|---|---|---|---|
| 13 | GK | ESP | Meritxell Muñoz |
| 14 | MF | ESP | Júlia Bartel |
| 15 | DF | ESP | Berta Doltra |
| 16 | MF | ESP | María Pérez |
| 17 | FW | ESP | Paula López |
| 18 | DF | ESP | Esther Laborde |
| 19 | FW | ESP | Ona Baradad |
| 20 | FW | ESP | Lucia Corrales |
| 21 | FW | ESP | Rocío García |
| 22 | GK | ESP | Meritxell Font |
| — | DF | ESP | Berta Bou |

=== Youth team ===
Note: Flags indicate national team as defined under FIFA eligibility rules; some limited exceptions apply. Players may hold more than one non-FIFA nationality.

| No. | Pos. | Nation | Player |
|---|---|---|---|
| 23 | MF | ESP | Laura Mas Serra |
| 26 | DF | ESP | Noah Bezis |
| 27 | FW | ESP | Laia Martret |
| 28 | MF | ESP | Nina Pou |

| No. | Pos. | Nation | Player |
|---|---|---|---|
| 29 | DF | ESP | Judit Pujols |
| 30 | DF | ESP | Adriana Ranera |
| 35 | GK | ESP | Mar Perez |

=== Technical staff ===
| Position | Staff |
|---|---|
| Head coach | Òscar Belis |
| Assistant coach | Pol Grau |
| Goalkeeping coach | Albert Castillo |
| Fitness coach | Irene del Río |
| Physiotherapist | Eugenia De Muga |

Last updated: 27 March 2022
Source: FC Barcelona

== Transfers ==
| | In | Out |
|---|---|---|
| Summer | GK: M. Font (promoted from the youth team); DF: B. Doltra (Girona); FW: L. Corrales (Atlético Baleares), R. Garcia (UD Collerense) | GK: L. García (Levante Las Planas); DF: J. Fernández (promoted to the first team), E. Ramírez (loaned to Real Sociedad), J. Mora (Levante Las Planas); FW: B. Vilamala (promoted to the first team), G. Queiroz (loaned to Levante) |

== Competitions ==
=== Segunda División Pro (Group North) ===
==== League table ====
| | Team | P | W | D | L | F | A | GD | Points |
|---|---|---|---|---|---|---|---|---|---|
| 1 | Levante Las Planas (P) (Note: Promotion to Primera División - tier 1) | 30 | 19 | 5 | 6 | 64 | 37 | 27 | 62 |
| 2 | Espanyol | 30 | 17 | 7 | 6 | 50 | 34 | 16 | 58 |
| 3 | Osasuna | 30 | 17 | 6 | 7 | 56 | 33 | 23 | 57 |
| 4 | Dux Logroño | 30 | 15 | 8 | 7 | 48 | 33 | 15 | 53 |
| 5 | Barcelona B | 30 | 16 | 3 | 11 | 52 | 32 | 20 | 51 |
| 6 | Deportivo La Coruña (PO) (Note: Won play-off with team in other group for place in Primera Federación - tier 2) | 30 | 15 | 6 | 9 | 49 | 29 | 20 | 51 |
| 7 | AEM (PO) | 30 | 15 | 5 | 10 | 46 | 39 | 7 | 50 |
| 8 | Oviedo (PO) | 30 | 14 | 4 | 12 | 38 | 36 | 2 | 46 |
| 9 | Zaragoza (PO) (Note: Lost play-off with team in other group, relegated to Segunda Federación - tier 3) | 30 | 13 | 4 | 13 | 45 | 45 | 0 | 43 |
| 10 | Athletic Bilbao B (PO) | 30 | 11 | 6 | 13 | 44 | 41 | 3 | 39 |
| 11 | Parquesol (PO) | 30 | 11 | 5 | 14 | 41 | 51 | -10 | 38 |
| 12 | Racing (R) (Note: Relegation to Segunda Federación - tier 3) | 30 | 10 | 8 | 12 | 37 | 43 | -6 | 38 |
| 13 | Pradejón (R) | 30 | 8 | 6 | 16 | 32 | 53 | -21 | 30 |
| 14 | Atlético Madrid B (R) | 30 | 9 | 3 | 18 | 34 | 60 | -26 | 30 |
| 15 | Sporting Gijón (R) (Note: Relegation to Primera Nacional - tier 4) | 30 | 6 | 5 | 19 | 33 | 53 | -20 | 23 |
| 16 | Seagull (R) | 30 | 2 | 3 | 25 | 23 | 73 | -50 | 9 |

Source: Federación Española de Fútbol: Clasificación de la Segunda División Femenina de Fútbol – Grupo Norte

==== Matches ====
| 5 September 2021 1 | Deportivo Abanca | 2—1 | Barcelona B |
| | Ruiz 22'; Merino 64' | Report | Pérez 7' |

| 12 September 2021 2 | Barcelona B | 3—2 | SE AEM |
| | Vignola 37'; Caño 57'; García 89' (pen.) | Report | Aixalà 42'; Fernández 89' |

| 26 September 2021 3 | CD Parquesol | 0—2 | Barcelona B |
| | | Report | Riumalló 52' (pen.); Mingueza 88' |

| 3 October 2021 4 | Barcelona B | 2—1 | CDE Racing |
| | Muiña 36' | Report | García 56'; Baradad 71' |

| 10 October 2021 5 | Athletic Club B | 2—1 | Barcelona B |
| | Amezaga 4', 12' | Report | Baradad 70' |

| 17 October 2021 6 | Barcelona B | 0—1 | Logroño |
| | | Report | Hernández 39' |

| 31 October 2021 7 | Real Oviedo | 2—1 | Barcelona B |
| | Corte 3', 88' | Report | Caño 20' |

| 7 November 2021 8 | Barcelona B | 1—3 | Levante Las Planas |
| | Baradad 70' | Report | P. Garrote 31'; Mellado 60'; N. Garrote 89' |

| 14 November 2021 9 | Seagull | 0—3 | Barcelona B |
| | | Report | Molina 29'; Gordo 68' (o.g.); Llopis 89' |

| 20 November 2021 10 | Barcelona B | 4—0 | Atlético Madrid B |
| | Baradad 10'; Corrales 38'; Molina 40'; Bartel 41' | Report |

| 4 December 2021 11 | Espanyol | 1—0 | Barcelona B |
| | De la Fuente 89' | Report |

| 12 December 2021 12 | Barcelona B | 3—0 | Sporting de Gijón |
| | García 30'; Riumalló 61'; Fernández 65' | Report |

| 9 January 2022 13 | Barcelona B | 3—1 | CD Pradejón |
| | Riumalló 24'; Llopis 69'; Corrales 73' | Report | Ruiz 14' |

| 15 January 2022 14 | Osasuna | 0—1 | Barcelona B |
| | | Report | Riumalló 25' |

| 23 January 2022 15 | Barcelona B | 1—0 | Zaragoza CFF |
| | Caño 46' | Report |

| 30 January 2022 16 | Logroño | 3—1 | Barcelona B |
| | García 23'; Hernandez 47'; Elloh 81' | Report | Vignola 25' |

| 6 February 2022 17 | CDE Racing | 2—1 | Barcelona B |
| | Andrés 2'; Martínez 61' (pen.) | Report | Fernández 65' |

| 27 February 2022 18 | Barcelona B | 3—1 | Athletic Club B |
| | Caño 75'; García 80'; Riumalló 87' | Report | Urzainqui 20' |

| 5 March 2022 19 | Atlético Madrid B | 2—1 | Barcelona B |
| | Moreno 6'; Moreno 39' | Report | Bartel 69' |

| 12 March 2022 20 | Barcelona B | 2—1 | Deportivo Abanca |
| | García 43'; Ranera 89' | Report | Ruiz 34' |

| 20 March 2022 21 | Sporting de Gijón | 1—1 | Barcelona B |
| | Restrepo 64' | Report | Pou 32' |

| 27 March 2022 22 | Barcelona B | 1—0 | Real Oviedo |
| | Bartel 69' | Report |

| 2 April 2022 23 | SE AEM | 0—3 | Barcelona B |
| | | Report | Vignola 79'; García 84'; Vignola 86' |

| 17 April 2022 24 | Barcelona B | 1—1 | Espanyol |
| | Baradad 17' | Report | Martín 90' |

| 24 April 2022 25 | Barcelona B | 3—0 | Seagull |
| | Pérez 3'; Molina 17'; Riumalló 87' | Report |

| 30 April 2022 26 | Levante Las Planas | 0—2 | Barcelona B |
| | | Report | García 59'; García 68' (pen.) |

| 7 May 2022 27 | Barcelona B | 1—1 | CD Parquesol |
| | García 1' | Report | Charle Romero 11' |

| 14 May 2022 28 | CD Pradejón | 1—0 | Barcelona B |
| | Ibáñez 71' | Report |

| 22 May 2022 29 | Barcelona B | 5—2 | Osasuna |
| | | Report |

| 28 May 2022 30 | Zaragoza CFF | 2—1 | Barcelona B |
| | García 89' (pen.); Álvarez 90' | Report | Laborde 69' |

== Statistics ==
As of 15 May 2022

| No. | Pos. | Nat. | Name | League | | Notes |
| No. | Pos. | Nat. | Name | Apps | Goals | Notes |
|---|---|---|---|---|---|---|
| 1 | GK | (Spain) | Laura Coronado | 0 | 0 | |
| 2 | DF | (Spain) | Martina Fernández | 27 | 2 | |
| 3 | DF | (Spain) | Clara Rodríguez | 27 | 0 | |
| 4 | MF | (Spain) | Laura Lobo | 10 | 0 | |
| 5 | DF | (Spain) | María Molina | 25 | 3 | |
| 6 | MF | (Spain) | Ariadna Mingueza | 21 | 1 | |
| 7 | FW | (Bulgaria) | Viktoria Adrianova | 0 | 0 | |
| 8 | MF | (Spain) | Alba Caño | 24 | 4 | |
| 9 | FW | (Spain) | Claudia Riumalló | 27 | 6 | |
| 10 | FW | (Spain) | Ornella Vignola | 23 | 4 | |
| 11 | FW | (Spain) | Sara Ismael | 19 | 0 | |
| 12 | MF | (Spain) | Marta Llopis | 18 | 2 | |
| 13 | GK | (Spain) | Meritxell Muñoz | 12 | 0 | |
| 14 | MF | (Spain) | Júlia Bartel | 26 | 3 | |
| 15 | DF | (Spain) | Berta Doltra | 22 | 0 | |
| 16 | MF | (Spain) | María Pérez | 21 | 2 | |
| 17 | FW | (Spain) | Paula López | 0 | 0 | |
| 18 | DF | (Spain) | Esther Laborde | 20 | 0 | |
| 19 | FW | (Spain) | Ona Baradad | 22 | 5 | |
| 20 | FW | (Spain) | Lucía Corrales | 17 | 2 | |
| 21 | FW | (Spain) | Rocío García | 17 | 9 | |
| 22 | GK | (Spain) | Meritxell Font | 16 | 0 | |
| 23 | MF | (Spain) | Laura Mas Serra | 4 | 0 | |
| 26 | DF | (Spain) | Noah Bezis | 1 | 0 | |
| 27 | FW | (Spain) | Laia Martret | 5 | 0 | |
| 28 | MF | (Spain) | Nina Pou | 13 | 1 | |
| 29 | DF | (Spain) | Judit Pujols | 3 | 0 | |
| 30 | DF | (Spain) | Adriana Ranera | 7 | 1 | |
| 35 | GK | (Spain) | Mar Perez | 0 | 0 | |
