= 2019–20 FC Barcelona Femení season =

Barcelona Femení
2019–20 season
- Primera División: 1st
- Copa de la Reina: Winners
- Copa Catalunya: Winners
- Supercopa de España: Winners
- UEFA Champions League: Semi-finals
- Biggest win: Home: Barcelona 9–1 Tacón; Away: Real Sociedad 1–10 Barcelona
- Biggest defeat: Wolfsburg 1–0 Barcelona
Home colours	Away colours

The 2019–20 season was the 32nd season in the history of FC Barcelona Femení. Having experienced a trophy drought since 2018, the team won all four domestic titles, as well as reaching the semi-finals of the Champions League in which they went out by a 0–1 defeat at the hands of Wolfsburg for Barcelona's only loss of the season in all competitions.

Several of the cup competitions were significantly postponed (with Barcelona playing their last final of the season in February 2021), while the league (like many women's leagues) was ended prematurely and the final league table calculated artificially, due to the COVID-19 pandemic.

In the final of the Supercopa, defender Marta Torrejón scored four goals, to become one of few defenders to score a hat-trick (or more).

== Players ==
Due to the COVID-19 pandemic, the season included postponed matches played during the period of the following, 2020–21, season. Players marked with a ‡ were not available after summer 2020 either through departure or loan. Players marked with † were only available after summer 2020. Players marked with * moved from a Barcelona B to a first-team contract after summer 2020.

=== First team ===
No.	Pos.	Nat.	Name	Age	Since	App.	Goals
Goalkeepers
1	GK	(Spain)	Sandra Paños (4th captain)	27	2015	163	0
13	GK	(Mexico)	Pamela Tajonar ‡		2018	8	0
13	GK	(Spain)	Cata Coll †		2020	1	0
25	GK	(Spain)	Gemma Font	20	2018	1	0
Defenders
3	DF	(Netherlands)	Stefanie van der Gragt ‡		2018	21	3
4	DF	(Spain)	Mapi León	25	2017	111	4
5	DF	(Spain)	Melanie Serrano		2003		
8	DF	(Spain)	Marta Torrejón (3rd captain)	30	2013	266	37
15	DF	(Spain)	Leila Ouahabi		2011		
17	DF	(Spain)	Andrea Pereira		2018	62	0
18	DF	(Switzerland)	Ana-Maria Crnogorčević		2019	11	0
–	DF	(Spain)	Jana Fernández † *			1	0
Midfielders
6	MF	(Spain)	Vicky Losada (captain)		2006		
9	MF	(Spain)	Mariona Caldentey	24	2014	154	54
10	MF	(France)	Kheira Hamraoui		2018	61	8
12	MF	(Spain)	Patricia Guijarro (5th captain)	22	2015	147	33
14	MF	(Spain)	Aitana Bonmatí	22	2016	112	29
Forwards
7	FW	(Spain)	Jenni Hermoso		2013	151	119
11	FW	(Spain)	Alexia Putellas (vice captain)	26	2012		
16	FW	(Norway)	Caroline Graham Hansen	25	2019	28	10
19	FW	(Spain)	Candela Andújar ‡		2017	44	3
20	FW	(Nigeria)	Asisat Oshoala	25	2019	43	38
21	FW	(Spain)	Andrea Falcón		2013	31	0
22	FW	(Netherlands)	Lieke Martens		2017	87	30
31	FW	(Spain)	Bruna Vilamala *		2020	1	0

- Last updated: 25 August 2020
- Source: FCBarcelona.com, LaLiga.com and UEFA.com
- Ordered by squad number.

=== Reserve team ===
Players who have a squad number and are eligible to play for the first team.

As of 2020

Note: Flags indicate national team as defined under FIFA eligibility rules; some limited exceptions apply. Players may hold more than one non-FIFA nationality.

No.	Pos.	Nation	Player
23	FW	ESP	Carla Armengol ‡
24	FW	ESP	Clàudia Pina ‡
26	DF	ESP	Laia Codina
28	FW	ESP	Arola Aparicio
31	FW	ESP	Bruna Vilamala *
—	FW	BRA	Giovana Queiroz †

== Transfers ==
=== In ===
No.	Pos.	Nat.	Player	Moving from	Type	Source
Summer 2019
16	FW	(Norway)	Caroline Graham Hansen	(Germany) VfL Wolfsburg	Free transfer	
20	FW	(Nigeria)	Asisat Oshoala	(China) Dalian Quanjian	Transfer	
7	FW	(Spain)	Jenni Hermoso	Atlético Madrid	Free transfer	
21	FW	(Spain)	Andrea Falcón	Atlético Madrid	Free transfer	
–	GK	(Spain)	Cata Coll	Collerense		
Winter
18	DF	(Switzerland)	Ana-Maria Crnogorčević	(United States) Portland Thorns	Free agent	
Summer 2020
13	GK	(Spain)	Cata Coll	Sevilla	Loan return	
–	FW	(Brazil)	Giovana Queiroz	Madrid CFF	Free transfer	

=== Out ===
No.	Pos.	Nat.	Player	Moving to	Source
Summer 2019
19	FW	(Spain)	Bárbara Latorre	Real Sociedad	
7	MF	(Spain)	Gemma Gili	Levante	
21	MF	(North Macedonia)	Nataša Andonova	Levante	
2	DF	(Spain)	Marta Unzué	Athletic Club (Loan)	
–	GK	(Spain)	Cata Coll	Sevilla (Loan)	
10	FW	(Brazil)	Andressa Alves	(Italy) AS Roma	
16	FW	(England)	Toni Duggan	Atlético Madrid	
Summer 2020
3	DF	(Netherlands)	Stefanie van der Gragt	(Netherlands) Ajax	
13	GK	(Mexico)	Pamela Tajonar	Logroño	
19	FW	(Spain)	Candela Andujar	Valencia (Loan)	
24	FW	(Spain)	Clàudia Pina	Sevilla (Loan)	
23	FW	(Spain)	Carla Armengol	Sevilla (Loan)	

== Pre-season ==
11 August 2019	Barcelona	5–0	(France) Marseille	Sant Joan Despí
11:00 CEST	Aitana 16'; Jenni Hermoso 19'; Alexia 34', 52'; Oshoala 63'	Report		Stadium: Ciutat Esportiva Joan Gamper; Referee: Víctor Manuel Sánchez Rico

14 August 2019	Arsenal (England)	2–5	Barcelona	Borehamwood, England
20:30 CEST	McCabe 36'; Little 76' (pen.)	Report	Patri Guijarro 44'; Oshoala 45', 50'; Claudia Pina 70', 81'	Stadium: Meadow Park; Referee: Kirsty Dowle (England)

18 August 2019	Montpellier (France)	0–1	Barcelona	Montpellier, France
18:00 CEST		Report	Oshoala 6'	Stadium: Centre d'entrenament Bernard Gasset; Referee: Karine Valcke (France)

== Competitions ==
=== Overall record ===
Competition	First match	Last match	Starting round	Final position	Record							
Competition	First match	Last match	Starting round	Final position	Pld	W	D	L	GF	GA	GD	Win %
Primera División	7 September 2019	1 March 2020	Matchday 1	Winner	21	19	2	0	86	6	+80	90.48
Copa de la Reina	12 February 2020	13 February 2021	Round of 16	Winner	4	4	0	0	14	0	+14	100.00
Copa Catalunya	22 August 2019	24 August 2019	Semi-finals	Winner	2	2	0	0	9	1	+8	100.00
Supercopa de España Femenina	6 February 2020	9 February 2020	Semi-finals	Winner	2	2	0	0	13	3	+10	100.00
UEFA Women's Champions League	11 September 2019	25 August 2020	Group stage	Semi-finals	6	5	0	1	13	3	+10	83.33
Total					35	32	2	1	135	13	+122	91.43

Last updated: 13 February 2021
Source: Competitions

=== Primera División ===
==== Results summary ====
Overall								Home						Away					
Pld	W	D	L	GF	GA	GD	Pts	W	D	L	GF	GA	GD	W	D	L	GF	GA	GD
21	19	2	0	86	6	+80	59	11	0	0	55	5	+50	8	2	0	31	1	+30

Source: RFEF

==== Matches ====
7 September 2019 1	Barcelona	9–1	Tacón	Sant Joan Despí
18:00 CEST	Alexia 8'; Aitana 28', 60'; Lucía Suárez 36' (o.g.); Mariona 40'; Graham 70'; Jennifer Hermoso 72', 76', 93'	Report	Jessica Martínez 54'	Stadium: Estadi Johan Cruyff; Referee: Paola Cebollada

15 September 2019 2	Rayo Vallecano	1–1	Barcelona	Madrid
12:00 CEST	Auñón 58'	Report	Jennifer Hermoso 83'	Stadium: Estadio de Vallecas; Referee: Beatriz Arregui

21 September 2019 3	Barcelona	6–1	Atlético Madrid	Sant Joan Despí
16:00 CEST	J. Hermoso 7'; Mariona 29'; Aleixandri 35' (o.g.); Oshoala 45', 46'; Messeguer 76' (o.g.)	Report	Sampedro 2'	Stadium: Estadi Johan Cruyff; Referee: Marta Huerta de Aza

29 September 2019 4	Sevilla	0–2	Barcelona	Sevilla
12:00 CEST		Report	Jennifer Hermoso 38'; Oshoala 87'	Stadium: Estadio Jesús Navas; Referee: Rivera Olmedo

13 October 2019 5	Sporting Club de Huelva	0–1	Barcelona	Huelva
11:30 CEST		Report	Oshoala 29'	Stadium: Ciudad Deportiva Decano del Fútbol Español; Referee: Paola Cebollada

20 October 2019 6	Barcelona	5–0	EDF Logroño	Sant Joan Despí
16:00 CEST	Marta Torrejón 4'; Jenni Hermoso 23'; Aitana 25'; Oshoala 51'; Hamraoui 81'	Report		Stadium: Estadi Johan Cruyff; Referee: María Eugenia Gil Soriano

26 October 2019 7	Madrid CFF	0–4	Barcelona	San Sebastián de los Reyes
16:00 CEST		Report	Oshoala 42', 46'; Jennifer Hermoso 73'; Aitana 87'	Stadium: Estadio José Luis de la Hoz-Matapiñonera; Referee: Elia María Martínez Martínez

3 November 2019 8	Barcelona	5–0	Levante	Sant Joan Despí
12:00 CEST	Graham 40'; Alexia 45' (pen.); Jenni 88', 89'; Hamraoui 90'	Report		Stadium: Estadi Johan Cruyff; Referee: María Dolores Martínez

17 November 2019 9	Real Sociedad	Cancelled	Barcelona	Zubieta
				Stadium: Zubieta Facilities
Note: All matchday 9 fixtures were postponed due to players' strike. It was not able to be rescheduled.

24 November 2019 10	Barcelona	6–1	Deportivo de La Coruña	Sant Joan Despí
12:00 CEST	Graham 24', 47', 48'; J. Hermoso 32'; Mariona 39'; Aitana 54'	Report	Abelleira 89'	Stadium: Estadi Johan Cruyff; Referee: Arantza Gallestegui Pérez

30 November 2019 11	Valencia	0–4	Barcelona	Paterna
16:00 CEST		Report	Jenni Hermoso 12'; Alexia 44', 72'; Mariona 75'	Stadium: Estadio Antonio Puchades; Referee: Elena Contreras Patiño

8 December 2019 12	Barcelona	3–0	Real Betis	Sant Joan Despí
12:00 CEST	Alexia 8'; Jenni Hermoso 33' (pen.); Mariona 37' (pen.)	Report		Stadium: Estadi Johan Cruyff; Referee: Zulema González González

14 December 2019 13	Espanyol	0–4	Barcelona	Sant Adrià de Besòs
17:00 CEST		Report	Jenni Hermoso 32', 43'; Marta Torrejón 84'; Vicky Losada 93'	Stadium: Ciutat Esportiva de Sant Adrià; Referee: María Dolores Martínez Madrona

21 December 2019 14	Barcelona	3–1	UD Granadilla	Sant Joan Despí
12:00 CEST	Oshoala 16'; Graham 77'; Alexia 83'	Report	Martín-Prieto 61'	Stadium: Estadi Johan Cruyff; Referee: Sara Fernández Ceferino

5 January 2020 15	Athletic Club	0–3	Barcelona	Bilbao
12:00 CEST		Report	Mariona 64'; Oshoala 77', 86'	Stadium: San Mamés; Referee: Elia María Martínez Martínez

11 January 2020 16	CD Tacón	0–6	Barcelona	Madrid
16:30 CEST		Report	Oshoala 2', 19', 47', 63'; J. Hermoso 17'; Torrejón 38'	Stadium: Alfredo Di Stéfano Stadium; Referee: Xiomara Díaz García

18 January 2020 17	Barcelona	3–1	Rayo Vallecano	Sant Joan Despí
16:00 CEST	Patri 24'; J. Hermoso 26', 61'	Report	Sheila 62'	Stadium: Estadi Johan Cruyff; Referee: Marta Frías Acedo

25 January 2020 18	Atlético Madrid	0–0	Barcelona	Alcalá de Henares
12:00 CEST		Report		Stadium: Centro Deportivo Wanda Alcalá de Henares; Referee: Olatz Rivera Olmedorivera

1 February 2020 19	Barcelona	3–0	Sevilla	Sant Joan Despí
12:00 CEST	Alexia 49' (pen.); Oshoala 56'; Patri 73'	Report		Stadium: Estadi Johan Cruyff; Referee: Elena Contreras

15 February 2020 20	Barcelona	7–0	Sporting Club de Huelva	Sant Joan Despí
16:00 CEST	Graham 4'; Hermoso 24', 58'; Martens 72'; Alexia 74'; Oshoala 88', 90'	Report		Stadium: Estadi Johan Cruyff; Referee: Elia María Martínez

22 February 2020 21	EDF Logroño	0–6	Barcelona	Logroño
12:00 CEST		Report	Marta 32'; Alexia 34', 45'; Oshoala 54', 70', 89'	Stadium: Estadio Las Gaunas; Referee: Marta Frías Acedo

1 March 2020 22	Barcelona	5–0	Madrid CFF	Sant Joan Despí
12:00 CEST	Jennifer Hermoso 21', 50', 72'; Vicky Losada 30'; van der Gragt 94'	Report		Stadium: Estadi Johan Cruyff; Referee: Sara Fernández Ceferino

21 March 2020 23	Levante	Cancelled	Barcelona	Bunyol
18:30 CEST				Stadium: Ciudad Deportiva de Buñol

29 March 2020 24	Barcelona	Cancelled	Real Sociedad	Sant Joan Despí
				Stadium: Estadi Johan Cruyff

5 April 2020 25	Deportivo de La Coruña	Cancelled	Barcelona	Sant Joan Despí
				Stadium: Estadi Johan Cruyff

19 April 2020 26	Barcelona	Cancelled	Valencia	Sant Joan Despí
				Stadium: Estadi Johan Cruyff

26 April 2020 27	Real Betis	Cancelled	Barcelona	Sevilla
				Stadium: Ciudad Deportiva Luis del Sol

3 May 2020 28	Barcelona	Cancelled	Espanyol	Sant Joan Despí
				Stadium: Estadi Johan Cruyff

10 May 2020 29	UD Granadilla	Cancelled	Barcelona	El Médano
				Stadium: La Hoya del Pozo

17 May 2020 30	Barcelona	Cancelled	Athletic Club	Sant Joan Despí
				Stadium: Estadi Johan Cruyff

Source: RFEF

=== Copa de la Reina ===
12 February 2020 Round of 16	Sporting Club de Huelva	0–4	Barcelona	Huelva
16:30 CEST		Report	Oshoala 43', 70'; Jenni Hermoso 47'; Graham 67'	Stadium: Ciudad Deportiva Decano del Fútbol Español; Referee: María Romero Navarro

26 February 2020 Quarterfinal	Barcelona	1–0 (a.e.t.)	Deportivo de La Coruña	Sant Joan Despí
19:00 CEST	Hamraoui 120'	Report		Stadium: Estadi Johan Cruyff; Referee: Olatz Rivera Olmedo

8 October 2020 Semifinal	Barcelona	6–0	Sevilla	Sant Joan Despí
17:00 CEST	Oshoala 4', 38'; Caroline Graham Hansen 18'; Patri Guijarro 21'; Melanie 68'; Aitana 72'	Report		Stadium: Estadi Johan Cruyff; Referee: Arantza Gallastegui
Note: Originally scheduled for 18 March 2020.

13 February 2021 Final	Barcelona	3–0	EDF Logroño	Málaga
17:30 CEST	Alexia 42' (pen.); Aitana 44'; Jennifer Hermoso 61'	Report		Stadium: La Rosaleda Stadium; Referee: Zulema González González
Note: Originally scheduled for 31 May 2020.

=== Copa Catalunya ===
22 August 2019 Semifinal	Barcelona	5–1	CE Seagull	Palamós
20:30 CEST	Alexia 5', 40'; Aitana 12'; Marta T. 22'; Oshoala 82'	Report	Esther Solà 44'	Stadium: Estadi Palamós Costa Brava; Referee: Ester Erra

24 August 2019 Final	Barcelona	4–0	Espanyol	Palamós
20:30 CEST	Oshoala 25'; Mariona 31', 64' (pen.); Pina 89'	Report		Stadium: Estadi Palamós Costa Brava; Referee: Ylenia Sánchez

=== Supercopa de España Femenina ===
6 February 2020 Semifinals	Atlético Madrid	2–3	Barcelona	Villares de la Reina
20:00 CEST	Duggan 3'; Charlyn 61'	Report	Patri 12'; Martens 27'; Oshoala 43'	Stadium: Helmántico Stadium; Referee: María Dolores Martínez

9 February 2020 Final	Real Sociedad	1–10	Barcelona	Villares de la Reina
12:00 CEST	Manu 63'	Report	Marta Torrejón 5', 33', 56', 78'; Alexia 7', 44'; Oshoala 35', 51'; Graham 37'; Candela 75'	Stadium: Helmántico Stadium; Attendance: 9,217; Referee: Marta Huerta de Aza
Note: The players did not play for the first 30 seconds of the match in protest of the lack of collective bargaining agreement with the league.

=== UEFA Women's Champions League ===
==== Knockout phase ====
11 September 2019 Round of 32 – 1st leg	Juventus (Italy)	0–2	Barcelona	Alessandria, Italy
20:30 CEST		Report	Alexia Putellas 38'; Marta Torrejón 71'	Stadium: Stadio Giuseppe Moccagatta; Referee: Kateryna Monzul (Ukraine)

25 September 2019 Round of 32 – 2nd leg	Barcelona	2–1	(Italy) Juventus	Sant Joan Despí
18:30 CEST	Alexia 32'; van der Gragt 39'	Report	Stašková 79'	Stadium: Estadi Johan Cruyff; Referee: Esther Staubli (Switzerland)

17 October 2019 Round of 16 – 1st leg	Barcelona	5–0	(Belarus) FC Minsk	Sant Joan Despí
19:00 CEST	Oshoala 6'; Marta Torrejón 20'; Aitana 22', 26'; Jennifer Hermoso 85'	Report		Stadium: Estadi Johan Cruyff; Referee: Rebecca Welch (England)

30 October 2019 Round of 16 – 2nd leg	FC Minsk (Belarus)	1–3	Barcelona	Minsk, Belarus
15:00 CEST	Ogbiagbevha 60'	Report	Alexia 66'; Mariona 80'; Patri Guijarro 88'	Stadium: FC Minsk Stadium; Referee: Katalin Kulcsár (Hungary)

21 August 2020 Quarterfinal	Atlético Madrid	0–1	Barcelona	Bilbao
18:00 CEST		Report	Hamraoui 80'	Stadium: San Mamés; Referee: Stéphanie Frappart (France)
Note: Originally scheduled as a two-legged fixture for 25 March and 1 April 2020, the Champions League was postponed indefinitely due to the COVID-19 pandemic before the matches could be played. A format change was announced later in the year, with all final rounds to be played as single-legged fixtures at neutral stadiums in the Basque Country.

25 August 2020 Semifinal	Wolfsburg (Germany)	1–0	Barcelona	Donostia / San Sebastián
20:00 CEST	Rolfö 58'	Report		Stadium: Anoeta Stadium; Referee: Katalin Kulcsár (Hungary)
Note: Originally scheduled as a two-legged fixture for April and May 2020, the Champions League was postponed indefinitely due to the COVID-19 pandemic before the matches could be played. A format change was announced later in the year, with all final rounds to be played as single-legged fixtures at neutral stadiums in the Basque Country.

== Statistics ==
=== Overall ===
As of 13 February 2021

No..	Pos.	Nat.	Player	Primera División		Copa de la Reina		Supercopa de España		Copa Catalunya		Champions League		Total		Discipline		Notes
No..	Pos.	Nat.	Player	Apps	Goals	Apps	Goals	Apps	Goals	Apps	Goals	Apps	Goals	Apps	Goals	Yellow card	Red card	Notes
Goalkeepers
1	GK	(Spain)	Sandra Paños	19	0	1	0	2	0	1	0	5	0	28	0	0	0	
13	GK	(Mexico)	Pamela Tajonar	2	0	2	0	0	0	0	0	1	0	5	0	0	0	
13	GK	(Spain)	Cata Coll	0	0	1	0	0	0	0	0	0	0	1	0	0	0	
25	GK	(Spain)	Gemma Font	0	0	0	0	0	0	1	0	0	0	1	0	0	0	
Defenders
3	DF	(Netherlands)	Stefanie van der Gragt	4+3	1	1	0	0	0	0+1	0	2	1	11	2	0	0	
4	DF	(Spain)	Mapi León	19	0	4	0	2	0	2	0	5	0	32	0	1	1	
5	DF	(Spain)	Melanie Serrano	4+9	0	0+2	1	0	0	1+1	0	1	0	18	1	2	0	
8	DF	(Spain)	Marta Torrejón	19+1	4	4	0	2	4	2	1	5	2	33	11	3	0	
15	DF	(Spain)	Leila Ouahabi	12+2	0	3	0	2	0	1+1	0	4+1	0	26	0	1	0	
17	DF	(Spain)	Andrea Pereira	16	0	3+1	0	2	0	2	0	5	0	29	0	0	0	
18	DF	(Switzerland)	Ana-Maria Crnogorčević	4+2	0	1+2	0	0+2	0	0	0	0	0	11	0	0	0	
26	DF	(Spain)	Laia Codina	0+4	0	0	0	0	0	0+1	0	0+1	0	6	0	0	0	
Midfielders
6	MF	(Spain)	Vicky Losada	1+6	2	0+3	0	0+2	0	0+2	0	0+2	0	16	2	0	0	
9	MF	(Spain)	Mariona Caldentey	15+2	6	2+2	0	2	0	2	2	5+1	1	31	9	1	0	
10	MF	(France)	Kheira Hamraoui	11+6	2	0+3	1	0	0	1+1	0	5	1	27	4	6	0	
12	MF	(Spain)	Patricia Guijarro	16+2	2	4	1	2	1	1+1	0	2+3	1	31	5	1	0	
14	MF	(Spain)	Aitana Bonmatí	13+7	5	3+1	2	0+2	0	2	1	3+1	2	32	10	0	0	
Forwards
7	FW	(Spain)	Jenni Hermoso	18+1	23	2+1	2	0	0	0	0	4+1	1	27	26	0	0	
11	FW	(Spain)	Alexia Putellas	19+1	10	3	1	2	2	2	2	6	3	33	18	2	0	
16	FW	(Norway)	Caroline Graham Hansen	14	7	4	2	2	1	1+1	0	5+1	0	28	10	0	0	
19	FW	(Spain)	Candela Andújar	2+13	0	0+1	0	0+1	1	0	0	1+3	0	21	1	0	0	
20	FW	(Nigeria)	Asisat Oshoala	13+6	20	3+1	4	2	3	2	2	4+1	1	32	30	1	0	
21	FW	(Spain)	Andrea Falcón	2+6	0	0	0	0	0	1+1	0	2	0	12	0	0	0	
22	FW	(Netherlands)	Lieke Martens	8+3	1	3	0	2	1	0	0	1+1	0	18	2	2	0	
23	FW	(Spain)	Carla Armengol	0+1	0	0	0	0	0	0	0	0+1	0	2	0	0	0	
24	FW	(Spain)	Clàudia Pina	0+4	0	0+1	0	0	0	0+2	1	1	0	8	1	0	0	
31	FW	(Spain)	Bruna Vilamala	0+1	0	0	0	0	0	0	0	0	0	1	0	0	0	

=== Goalscorers ===
As of 13 February 2021

Rank	No.	Pos.	Nat.	Player	Primera División	Copa de la Reina	Supercopa de España	Copa Catalunya	Champions League	Total
1	20	FW	(Nigeria)	Asisat Oshoala	20	4	3	2	1	30
2	7	FW	(Spain)	Jenni Hermoso	23	2	—	—	1	26
3	11	FW	(Spain)	Alexia Putellas	10	1	2	2	3	18
4	8	DF	(Spain)	Marta Torrejón	4	—	4	1	2	11
5	16	FW	(Norway)	Caroline Graham Hansen	7	2	1	—	—	10
5	14	MF	(Spain)	Aitana Bonmatí	5	2	—	1	2	10
7	9	MF	(Spain)	Mariona Caldentey	6	—	—	2	1	9
8	12	MF	(Spain)	Patricia Guijarro	2	1	1	—	1	5
9	10	MF	(France)	Kheira Hamraoui	2	1	—	—	1	4
10	6	MF	(Spain)	Vicky Losada	2	—	—	—	—	2
10	22	FW	(Netherlands)	Lieke Martens	1	—	1	—	—	2
10	3	DF	(Netherlands)	Stefanie van der Gragt	1	—	—	—	1	2
13	5	DF	(Spain)	Melanie Serrano	—	1	—	—	—	1
13	19	FW	(Spain)	Candela Andújar	—	—	1	—	—	1
13	24	FW	(Spain)	Clàudia Pina	—	—	—	1	—	1
Own goals (from the opponents)					3	—	—	—	–	3
Totals					86	14	13	9	13	134

=== Cleansheets ===
As of 13 February 2021

Rank	No.	Pos.	Nat.	Player	Primera División	Copa de la Reina	Supercopa de España	Copa Catalunya	Champions League	Total
1	1	GK	(Spain)	Sandra Paños	14	1	0	1	3	19
2	13	GK	(Mexico)	Pamela Tajonar	1	2	—	—	0	3
3	13	GK	(Spain)	Cata Coll	—	1	—	—	—	1
4	25	GK	(Spain)	Gemma Font	—	—	—	0	—	0
Totals					15	4	0	1	3	23

=== Disciplinary record ===
As of 13 February 2021

No.	Pos.	Nat.	Player	Primera División			Copa de la Reina			Supercopa de España			Copa Catalunya			Champions League			Total		
No.	Pos.	Nat.	Player	Booked	(yellow card) (yellow-red card)	Sent off (straight red)	Booked	(yellow card) (yellow-red card)	Sent off (straight red)	Booked	(yellow card) (yellow-red card)	Sent off (straight red)	Booked	(yellow card) (yellow-red card)	Sent off (straight red)	Booked	(yellow card) (yellow-red card)	Sent off (straight red)	Booked	(yellow card) (yellow-red card)	Sent off (straight red)
4	DF	(Spain)	Mapi León	1														1	1		1
10	MF	(France)	Kheira Hamraoui	5			1												6		
8	DF	(Spain)	Marta Torrejón	1						1						1			3		
5	DF	(Spain)	Melanie Serrano	2															2		
11	FW	(Spain)	Alexia Putellas	2															2		
22	FW	(Netherlands)	Lieke Martens	1			1												2		
15	DF	(Spain)	Leila Ouahabi	1															1		
20	FW	(Nigeria)	Asisat Oshoala	1															1		
12	MF	(Spain)	Patri Guijarro	1															1		
9	MF	(Spain)	Mariona Caldentey													1			1		
Totals				15			2			1						2		1	20		1

Source: FCBarcelona.com
Ordered by (red card) , (second yellow card) and (yellow card)
(yellow card) = Number of bookings; (second yellow card) = Number of sending offs after a second yellow card; (red card) = Number of sending offs by a direct red card.
