= 2020–21 FC Barcelona Femení season =

Barcelona Femení
2020–21 season
- President: Josep Maria Bartomeu and Joan Laporta
- Head coach: Lluís Cortés
- Stadium: Johan Cruyff Stadium
- Primera División: Winner
- Copa de la Reina: Winner
- Supercopa de España: Semi-finalist
- UEFA Champions League: Winner
Home colours	Away colours	Third colours

The 2020–21 season was the 33rd season for FC Barcelona Femení. The team played in the domestic league, as well as the Copa de la Reina, the Supercopa de España, and UEFA Women's Champions League. They became the first Spanish women's club to win the continental treble, winning the league, Champions League, and Copa de la Reina.

== Players ==
=== 2020–21 squad ===
Note: Flags indicate national team as defined under FIFA eligibility rules; some limited exceptions apply. Players may hold more than one non-FIFA nationality.

No.	Pos.	Nation	Player
1	GK	ESP	Sandra Paños (Fourth captain)
3	DF	ESP	Laia Codina
4	DF	ESP	Mapi León
5	DF	ESP	Melanie Serrano
6	MF	ESP	Vicky Losada (Captain)
7	FW	ESP	Jennifer Hermoso
8	DF	ESP	Marta Torrejón (Third captain)
9	MF	ESP	Mariona Caldentey
10	MF	FRA	Kheira Hamraoui
11	FW	ESP	Alexia Putellas (Vice-captain)
12	MF	ESP	Patricia Guijarro (Fifth captain)
13	GK	ESP	Cata Coll

No.	Pos.	Nation	Player
14	MF	ESP	Aitana Bonmatí
15	DF	ESP	Leila Ouahabi
16	FW	NOR	Caroline Graham Hansen
17	DF	ESP	Andrea Pereira
18	DF	SUI	Ana Maria Crnogorcevic
20	FW	NGR	Asisat Oshoala
21	FW	ESP	Andrea Falcón
22	FW	NED	Lieke Martens
23	DF	ESP	Jana Fernández
24	FW	ESP	Bruna Vilamala
25	GK	ESP	Gemma Font
29	FW	ESP	Giovana Queiroz (Note: Giovana was eligible for both Spain and Brazil, and had recently played for both nations' youth teams)

Source: FC Barcelona

=== FC Barcelona Femení B ===
Note: Flags indicate national team as defined under FIFA eligibility rules; some limited exceptions apply. Players may hold more than one non-FIFA nationality.

No.	Pos.	Nation	Player
32	MF	ESP	Ariadna Mingueza
33	DF	ESP	Emma Ramírez
34	MF	ESP	María Pérez
35	MF	ESP	Júlia Bartel

No.	Pos.	Nation	Player
37	FW	ESP	Ornella Vignola
38	DF	ESP	Berta Bou
39	DF	ESP	Maria Molina

=== Contract renewals ===
No.	Pos.	Nat.	Name	Date	Until	Source
8	DF	(Spain)	Marta Torrejón	21 May 2020	30 June 2022	
3	DF	(Spain)	Laia Codina	9 June 2020	30 June 2022	
–	FW	(Spain)	Candela Andújar	11 June 2020	30 June 2022	
–	FW	(Spain)	Claudia Pina	12 June 2020	30 June 2023	
18	DF	(Switzerland)	Ana-Maria Crnogorčević	16 June 2020	30 June 2021	
17	DF	(Spain)	Andrea Pereira	14 July 2020	30 June 2023	
25	GK	(Spain)	Gemma Font	14 July 2020	30 June 2022	
10	MF	(France)	Kheira Hamraoui	14 July 2020	30 June 2021	
5	DF	(Spain)	Melanie Serrano	14 July 2020	30 June 2021	
Coach		(Spain)	Lluís Cortés	3 June 2020	30 June 2021	

== Transfers ==
=== In ===
No.	Pos.	Nat.	Player	Moving from	Type	Date	Source
–	DF	(Spain)	Jana Fernández	Barcelona B	Promotion from Barcelona B (Note: Joined the main team with the option of playing for Barcelona B)	26 June 2020	
–	FW	(Spain)	Bruna Vilamala	Barcelona B	Promotion from Barcelona B	26 June 2020	
–	GK	(Spain)	Cata Coll	Sevilla	Loan return	2 July 2020	
–	FW	(Brazil)	Giovana Queiroz	Madrid CFF	Free transfer	17 July 2020	

=== Out ===
No.	Pos.	Nat.	Player	Moving to	Type	Date	Source
3	DF	(Netherlands)	Stefanie van der Gragt	Ajax	Free transfer	12 June 2020	
13	GK	(Mexico)	Pamela Tajonar	Logroño	Contract termination	3 July 2020	

=== Loans ===
No.	Pos.	Nat.	Player	On loan to	Date from	Date to	Source
–	FW	(Spain)	Candela Andújar	Valencia	12 July 2020	30 June 2021	
–	FW	(Spain)	Claudia Pina	Sevilla	18 July 2020	30 June 2021	
–	FW	(Spain)	Carla Armengol	Sevilla	19 July 2020	30 June 2021	

== Competitions ==
Win Draw Loss Postponed

=== Pre-season ===
2 August 2020	Barcelona	3–0	Montpellier	Sant Joan Despí
18:00 CEST	Oshoala 64', 86'; Hermoso 92'	Report		Stadium: Ciutat Esportiva Joan Gamper Camp 7 Referee: Martina Cárdenas López

9 August 2020	Barcelona	6–1	Montpellier	Sant Joan Despí
18:00 CEST	Aitana 19'; Martens 39'; Puntingam 41' (o.g.); Oshoala 63'; Alexia 72'; Leila 88'	Report	Banušić 82'	Stadium: Ciutat Esportiva Joan Gamper Camp 7 Referee: Sandra Márquez Redondo

24 September 2020	Barcelona	5–0	SE AEM	Sant Joan Despí
20:00 CEST	Alexia 4'; Oshoala 23'; Aitana 61', 65'; Mariona 64'	Report		Stadium: Ciutat Esportiva Joan Gamper Camp 7 Referee: Coral Couso Cuadrado

=== Primera División ===
==== League table ====
Pos	Team	Pld	W	D	L	GF	GA	GD	Pts	Qualification or relegation
1	Barcelona (C)	34	33	0	1	167	15	+152	99	Qualification for the Champions League group stage
2	Real Madrid	34	23	5	6	75	33	+42	74	Qualification for the Champions League second round
3	Levante	34	21	7	6	68	44	+24	70	Qualification for the Champions League first round
4	Atlético de Madrid	34	18	9	7	61	32	+29	63	
5	Real Sociedad	34	18	7	9	66	44	+22	61	

Source: RFEF
Rules for classification: 1) points; 2) head-to-head points; 3) goal difference; 4) number of goals scored
(C) Champions

==== Results by round ====
The table lists the position after each week of matches. In order to preserve chronological evolvements, any postponed matches are not included to the round at which they were originally scheduled, but added to the full round they were played immediately afterwards.

Round	1	2	3	4	5	6	7	8	9	10	11	12	13	14	15	16	17	18	19	20	21	22	23	24	25	26	27	28	29	30	31	32	33	34
Ground	A	H	A	A	H	H	H	A	H	A	H	H	A	H	A	H	A	A	H	A	A	H	H	H	A	A	H	A	A	H	A	A	H	H
Result	W	W	W	W	W	W	W	W	W	W	W	W	W	W	W	W	W	W	W	W	W	W	W	W	W	W	W	W	L	W	W	W	W	W
Position	1	1	1	1	2	3	2	3	3	2	3	1	1	1	1	1	1	1	1	1	1	1	1	1	1	1	1	1	1	1	1	1	1	1

Updated to match(es) played on 24 June 2021. Source: RFEF
A = Away; H = Home; W = Win; D = Draw; L = Loss; P = Postponed

==== Matches ====
4 October 2020 1	Real Madrid	0–4	Barcelona	Madrid
13:30 CEST		Report	Patri 18'; Misa 55' (o.g.); Martens 66'; Alexia 75'	Stadium: Estadi Alfredo Di Stéfano; Referee: Marta Frías Acedo

11 October 2020 2	Barcelona	6–0	Logroño	Sant Joan Despí
12:00 CEST	Martens 6'; Graham 17'; Losada 20'; Aitana 42', 92'; Alexia 81'	Report		Stadium: Estadi Johan Cruyff; Referee: Paola Cebollada

18 October 2020 3	Sporting Huelva	0–6	Barcelona	Huelva
12:00 CEST		Report	Oshoala 4'; Hamraoui 6'; Alexia 38'; Mariona 55'; Graham 75'; Bruna 78'	Stadium: Ciudad Deportiva Decano del Fútbol Español; Referee: María Eugenia Gil Soriano

31 October 2020 4	Real Betis	0–5	Barcelona	Sevilla
12:00 CEST		Report	Aitana 15'; Mariona 27'; Oshoala 46'; Cano 78' (o.g.); Hermoso 87'	Stadium: Ciudad Deportiva Luis del Sol; Referee: María Romero Navarro

Postponed 5	Barcelona	v	Rayo Vallecano	Sant Joan Despí
				Stadium: Estadi Johan Cruyff
Note: Postponed due to COVID-19

Postponed 6	Levante	v	Barcelona	Bunyol
				Stadium: Ciutat Esportiva de Bunyol
Note: Postponed due to COVID-19

11 November 2020 7	Barcelona	3–0	Atlético Madrid	Sant Joan Despí
19:00 CEST	Patri 31'; Hermoso 34'; Martens 84'	Report		Stadium: Estadi Johan Cruyff; Referee: Olatz Rivera Olmedo

Postponed 8	Eibar	v	Barcelona	Eibar
				Stadium: Complejo Deportivo de Unbe
Note: Postponed due to COVID-19

21 November 2020 9	Barcelona	5–1	Real Sociedad	Sant Joan Despí
12:00 CEST	Leila 16'; Nuria 41' (o.g.); Alexia 77'; Torrejón 82'; Mariona 84'	Report	Nahikari 32'	Stadium: Estadi Johan Cruyff; Referee: Elena Contreras Patiño

5 December 2020 10	Barcelona	9–0	Santa Teresa	Sant Joan Despí
12:00 CEST	Hermoso 3', 28', 34', 45'; Martens 10', 15', 25'; Mariona 45+2'; Oshoala 81'	Report		Stadium: Estadi Johan Cruyff; Referee: Elia Martinez Martinez

12 December 2020 11	Valencia	0–7	Barcelona	Paterna
12:00 CEST		Report	Mariona 1', 27'; Graham 34'; Oshoala 38', 44', 74'; Torrejón 55'	Stadium: Estadi Antonio Puchades; Referee: Marta Frías Acedo

19 December 2020 12	Barcelona	6–0	Sevilla	Sant Joan Despí
12:00 CEST	Alexia 10'; Hermoso 18'; Graham 44'; Oshoala 66'; Aitana 73', 76'	Report		Stadium: Estadi Johan Cruyff; Referee: Beatriz Arregui Gamir

22 December 2020 13	Deportivo La Coruña	1–6	Barcelona	Abegondo
14:00 CEST	Alba Merino 64'	Report	Hermoso 20', 24'; Oshoala 26', 49'; Aitana 34'; Torrejón 77'	Stadium: Ciudad Deportiva de Abegondo; Referee: Alicia Espinosa Ríos

6 January 2021 14	Barcelona	5–0	Espanyol	Barcelona
18:00 CEST	Alexia 45'; Torrejón 49'; Melanie 54'; Martens 72'; Crnogorčević 84'	Report		Stadium: Camp Nou; Referee: Maria Eugenia Gil Soriano

20 January 2021 5	Barcelona	7–0	Rayo Vallecano	Sant Joan Despí
17:00 CEST	Hermoso 4'; Alexia 11', 41'; Oshoala 15', 59'; María León 73'; Aitana 91'	Report		Stadium: Estadi Johan Cruyff; Referee: Arantza Gallastegui Pérez

Postponed 15	Madrid CFF	v	Barcelona	Madrid
				Stadium: Estadio Municipal Antiguo Canódromo
Note: Postponed due to Storm Filomena

Postponed 16	Barcelona	v	UDG Tenerife	Sant Joan Despí
				Stadium: Estadi Johan Cruyff
Note: Postponed due to COVID-19

Postponed 17	Athletic Club	v	Barcelona	Bilbao
				Stadium: Instal·lacions de Lezama País Basc
Note: Postponed due to COVID-19

31 January 2021 18	Barcelona	4–1	Real Madrid	Sant Joan Despí
12:00 CEST	Alexia 14'; Hermoso 23'; Oshoala 37', 70'	Report	Olga 81'	Stadium: Estadi Johan Cruyff; Referee: Elia María Martínez

3 February 2021 6	Levante	0–3	Barcelona	Bunyol
16:00 CEST		Report	Graham 36', 66'; Hermoso 85'	Stadium: Ciutat Esportiva de Bunyol; Referee: María Dolores Martínez Madrona

7 February 2021 19	Logroño	0–2	Barcelona	Logroño
12:00 CEST		Report	Losada 23'; Hamraoui 54'	Stadium: Estadi Mundial 82; Referee: Verónica González Sánchez

10 February 2021 20	Barcelona	6–0	Real Betis	Sant Joan Despí
19:00 CEST	María León 9'; Alexia 11'; Aitana 55'; Hermoso 66', 82' (pen.); Patri 74'	Report		Stadium: Estadi Johan Cruyff; Referee: Marta Frías Acedo

27 February 2021 8	Eibar	0–3	Barcelona	Eibar
10:30 CEST		Report	Melanie 25'; Mariona 66'; Hermoso 86'	Stadium: Complejo Deportivo de Unbe; Referee: Xiomara Díaz García

6 March 2021 21	Santa Teresa	0–3	Barcelona	Badajoz
15:00 CEST		Report	Alexia 8'; Hermoso 47'; Patri 72'	Stadium: El Vivero; Referee: Elena Casal Fernández

14 March 2021 22	Barcelona	5–0	Valencia	Sant Joan Despí
17:30 CEST	Alexia 7' (pen.); Graham 25', 90'; Oshoala 29'; Patri 44'	Report		Stadium: Estadi Johan Cruyff; Referee: Beatriz Arregui Gamir

20 March 2021 23	Rayo Vallecano	0–4	Barcelona	Madrid
14:00 CEST		Report	Crnogorčević 14'; Oshoala 31'; Hamraoui 55'; Martens 88'	Stadium: Estadi de Vallecas; Referee: Paola Cebollada López

27 March 2021 24	Sevilla	0–4	Barcelona	Sevilla
14:00 CEST		Report	Torrejón 47'; Martens 53', 60'; Bruna 80'	Stadium: Estadi Jesús Navas; Referee: Maria Romero Navarro

4 April 2021 25	Barcelona	7–1	Levante	Sant Joan Despí
12:00 CEST	Torrejón 4'; Losada 20'; Mariona 35'; Melanie 50'; Bruna 60'; Aitana 81'; Hermoso 85'	Report	Redondo 93'	Stadium: Estadi Johan Cruyff; Referee: Maria Eugenia Gil Soriano

17 April 2021 26	Barcelona	9–0	Deportivo La Coruña	Sant Joan Despí
12:00 CEST	María León 9'; Villegas 18' (o.g.); Alexia 30', 33', 56'; Hermoso 38', 91'; Iris 41' (o.g.); Torrejón 45'	Report		Stadium: Estadi Johan Cruyff; Referee: Paola Cebollada López

20 April 2021 16	Barcelona	6–1	UDG Tenerife	Sant Joan Despí
15:00 CEST	Hermoso 13', 25'; Alexia 29'; Martens 71'; Bruna 85', 91'	Report	Pisco 8'	Stadium: Estadi Johan Cruyff; Referee: María Dolores Martínez

28 April 2021 15	Madrid CFF	0–2	Barcelona	Madrid
12:00 CEST		Report	Bruna 31', 83'	Stadium: Estadio Municipal Antiguo Canódromo; Referee: María Romero Navarro

Postponed 27	Atlético Madrid	v	Barcelona	Alcalá de Henares
				Stadium: Centro Deportivo Wanda Alcalá de Henares
Note: Postponed due to clash with Barcelona's Champions League semi-final

Postponed 28	Barcelona	v	Athletic Club	Sant Joan Despí
				Stadium: Estadi Johan Cruyff
Note: Postponed due to clash with Barcelona's Champions League semi-final

9 May 2021 29	UDG Tenerife	0–1	Barcelona	Granadilla de Abona
12:30 CEST		Report	Bruna 37'	Stadium: La Palmera; Referee: Zulema González González

19 May 2021 28	Barcelona	8–0	Athletic Club	Sant Joan Despí
20:15 CEST	Hermoso 4', 35', 51'; Martens 13', 25'; Bruna 43', 64'; Crnogorčević 86'	Report		Stadium: Estadi Johan Cruyff; Referee: Elena Casal Fernandez

Postponed 30	Barcelona	v	Sporting Huelva	Sant Joan Despí
				Stadium: Estadi Johan Cruyff
Note: Postponed due to clash with Barcelona's Champions League final

22 May 2021 31	Espanyol	2–3	Barcelona	Sant Adrià del Besòs
14:00 CEST	Baudet 17' (pen.); Szymanowski 27'	Report	Crnogorčević 5'; Patri 38'; Mariona 93'	Stadium: Ciutat Esportiva de Sant Adrià; Referee: Alicia Espinosa Ríos

1 June 2021 27	Atlético Madrid	4–3	Barcelona	Alcalá de Henares
17:45 CEST	Sampedro 12'; Laurent 58', 67'; Deyna 79'	Report	Bruna 18'; Oshoala 36'; Torrejón 75'	Stadium: Centro Deportivo Wanda Alcalá de Henares; Referee: Marta Frías Acedo

6 June 2021 32	Barcelona	3–2	Madrid CFF	Sant Joan Despí
12:00 CEST	Bruna 2'; Torrejón 64'; Patri 73'	Report	Priscila 1'; Ohale 38'	Stadium: Estadi Johan Cruyff; Referee: Beatriz Cuesta Arribas

20 June 2021 33	Real Sociedad	1–4	Barcelona	Zubieta
17:00 CEST	Eizagirre 14'	Report	Hermoso 50', 80', 89'; Martens 75'	Stadium: Instal·lacions de Zubieta; Referee: Lidia Barragan Gaspar

22 June 2021 17	Athletic Club	0–4	Barcelona	Bilbao
16:00 CEST		Report	Patri 22'; Berta 33'; Oshoala 60'; Alexia 80'	Stadium: Instal·lacions de Lezama; Referee: Elena Casal Fernández

24 June 2021 30	Barcelona	5–0	Sporting Huelva	Sant Joan Despí
16:00 CEST	Martens 21'; Hermoso 29'; Aitana 64'; Oshoala 87'; Torrejón 93'	Report		Stadium: Estadi Johan Cruyff; Referee: Xiomara Díaz Garcia

27 June 2021 34	Barcelona	9–1	Eibar	Sant Joan Despí
11:00 CEST	Mariona 17', 28', 53', 81'; Alexia 22'; Hermoso 23', 27', 42'; Codina 92' (pen.)	Report	Arola 45+2'	Stadium: Estadi Johan Cruyff; Referee: Elena Peláez Arnillas

=== Copa de la Reina ===
5 May 2021 Quarter-final	Sevilla	1–4	Barcelona	Sevilla
19:00 CEST	Pina 12'	Report	Mariona 25'; Losada 48'; Alexia 49'; Graham 94'	Stadium: Estadi Jesús Navas; Referee: Beatriz Arregui Gamir

26 May 2021 Semi-final	Madrid CFF	0–4	Barcelona	Leganés
19:00 CEST		Report	Alexia 15', 69'; Bruna 63'; Mariona 66'	Stadium: Estadi Municipal de Butarque; Referee: María Eugenia Gil Soriano

30 May 2021 Final	Barcelona	4–2	Levante	Leganés
20:00 CEST	Patri 5'; Alexia 20', 73'; Torrejón 29'	Report	Redondo 59'; Banini 67'	Stadium: Estadi Municipal de Butarque; Referee: María Dolores Martínez Madrona

=== Supercopa de España ===
13 January 2021 Semi-final	Atlético Madrid	1–1 (a.e.t.) (3–1 p)	Barcelona	Almeria
19:00 CEST	van Dongen 67' (pen.)	Report	Alexia 90'	Stadium: Estadio de los Juegos Mediterráneos; Attendance: 0 Referee: Paola Cebollada López
	Penalties
	Diallo (penalty missed); Deyna (penalty scored); van Dongen (penalty missed); Laurent (penalty scored); Guagni (penalty scored)		(penalty missed) Hermoso; (penalty missed) Mariona; (penalty missed) Melanie; (penalty scored) Torrejón
Note: Played behind-closed-doors due to the COVID-19 pandemic

=== Champions League ===
Following the abandonment of the 2019–20 Primera División due to the COVID-19 pandemic, Barcelona and Atlético Madrid were selected by the RFEF to take the two Spain slots in the next year's Champions League. Due to Spain's high ranking, both teams entered in the knockout phase (round of 32), rather than go through qualifying.

==== Knockout phase ====
===== Round of 32 =====
9 December 2020 Away leg	PSV	1–4	Barcelona	Eindhoven
16:30 CEST	Smits 88'	Report	Hermoso 4'; van den Berg 44' (o.g.); Oshoala 66'; Martens 74'	Stadium: Jan Louwers Stadion; Referee: Olga Zadinová

16 December 2020 Home leg	Barcelona	4–1	PSV	Sant Joan Despí
17:00 CEST	Graham 4', 61'; Martens 40', 75'	Report	Smits 90'	Stadium: Estadi Johan Cruyff; Referee: Ivana Projkovska

===== Round of 16 =====
3 March 2021 Home leg	Barcelona	4–0	Fortuna Hjørring	Sant Joan Despí
16:45 CEST	Hermoso 12', 18', 56'; Alexia 82'	Report		Stadium: Estadi Johan Cruyff; Referee: Shona Shukrula

10 March 2021 Away leg	Fortuna Hjørring	0–5	Barcelona	Hjørring
15:55 CEST		Report	Aitana 36', 48'; Mariona 54' (pen.); Oshoala 78'; Torrejón 85'	Stadium: Hjørring Stadion; Referee: Lorraine Watson

===== Quarter-finals =====
24 March 2021 Home leg	Barcelona	3–0	Manchester City	Monza, Italy
12:30 CEST	Oshoala 35'; Mariona 52' (pen.); Hermoso 86'	Report		Stadium: U-Power Stadium; Referee: Tess Olofsson
Note: Played in Italy due to Spanish government restrictions on entry from the British Isles during the COVID-19 pandemic

30 March 2021 Away leg	Manchester City	2–1	Barcelona	Manchester
17:00 CEST	Beckie 20'; Mewis 68'	Report	Oshoala 59'	Stadium: Academy Stadium; Referee: Monika Mularczyk

Barcelona advance 4–2 on aggregate

===== Semi-finals =====
25 April 2021 Away leg	Paris Saint-Germain	1–1	Barcelona	Saint-Germain-en-Laye
15:00 CEST	Cook 22'	Report	Hermoso 13'	Stadium: Stade Georges Lefèvre; Referee: Olga Zadinova

2 May 2021 Home leg	Barcelona	2–1	Paris Saint-Germain	Sant Joan Despí
12:00 CEST	Martens 8', 31'	Report	Katoto 34'	Stadium: Estadi Johan Cruyff; Referee: Anastasia Pustovoitova

Barcelona advance 3–2 on aggregate

===== Final =====
16 May 2021 Final	Chelsea	0–4	Barcelona	Goteborg
21:00 CEST		Report	Leupolz 1' (o.g.); Alexia 14' (pen.); Aitana 20'; Graham 35'	Stadium: Estadi Gamla Ullevi; Attendance: 0 Referee: Riem Hussein
Note: Played behind-closed-doors due to the COVID-19 pandemic
