= Emilia Szymczak =

Polish footballer (born 2006)

Personal information
- Full name: Emilia Urszula Szymczak
- Date of birth: 17 June 2006 (age 20)
- Place of birth: Poland
- Height: 1.75 m (5 ft 9 in)
- Position: Midfielder

Team information
- Current team: Barcelona B

Youth career
- –2015: Hanza Goleniów
- 2015–2021: Żaki Szczecin

Senior career*
Years	Team	Apps	(Gls)
2021–2023	Górnik Łęczna	31	(2)
2023–	Barcelona B	40	(0)
2025–2026	→ Liverpool (loan)	0	(0)

International career^{‡}
2021–2023	Poland U17	20	(4)
2024–	Poland U19	2	(0)
2023–	Poland	19	(0)
- * Club domestic league appearances and goals as of 19:58, 2 June 2026 (UTC) ‡ National team caps and goals as of 10:58, 8 March 2026 (UTC)

Emilia Urszula Szymczak (born 17 June 2006) is a Polish professional footballer who plays as a midfielder for Primera Federación club Barcelona B and the Poland national team.

== Early life ==
Szymczak is a native of Goleniów, Poland.

== Club career ==
On 4 September 2025, Women's Super League club Liverpool announced the signing of Szymczak on a season-long loan from Barcelona B. She made a single league cup appearance before being recalled by Barcelona on 16 January 2026.

== International career ==
Szymczak represented Poland internationally during the 2023–24 UEFA Nations League, and the UEFA Women's Euro 2025, Poland's first ever major international tournament.

== Style of play ==
Szymczak mainly operates as a central midfielder.

== Career statistics ==
=== Club ===
As of match played 14 March 2026

Appearances and goals by club, season and competition
Club	Season	League			National cup (Note: Includes Polish Cup)		Other		Total	
Club	Season	Division	Apps	Goals	Apps	Goals	Apps	Goals	Apps	Goals
Górnik Łęczna	2021–22	Ekstraliga	13	1	0	0	—		13	1
Górnik Łęczna	2022–23	Ekstraliga	18	1	4	1	—		22	2
Górnik Łęczna	Total		31	2	4	1	—		35	3
Barcelona B	2023–24	Primera Federación	24	0	—		—		24	0
Barcelona B	2024–25	Primera Federación	14	0	—		—		14	0
Barcelona B	2025–26	Primera Federación	2	0	—		—		2	0
Barcelona B	Total		40	0	—		—		40	0
Liverpool (loan)	2025–26	Women's Super League	0	0	0	0	1 (Note: Appearance in Women's League Cup)	0	1	0
Career total			71	2	4	1	1	0	76	3

=== International ===
As of match played 7 March 2026

Appearances and goals by national team and year
National team	Year	Apps	Goals
Poland	2023	2	0
Poland	2024	5	0
Poland	2025	11	0
Poland	2026	1	0
Total		19	0

== Honours ==
Barcelona B

- Primera Federación: 2023–24
