= Adriana Ranera =

Spanish footballer (born 2005)

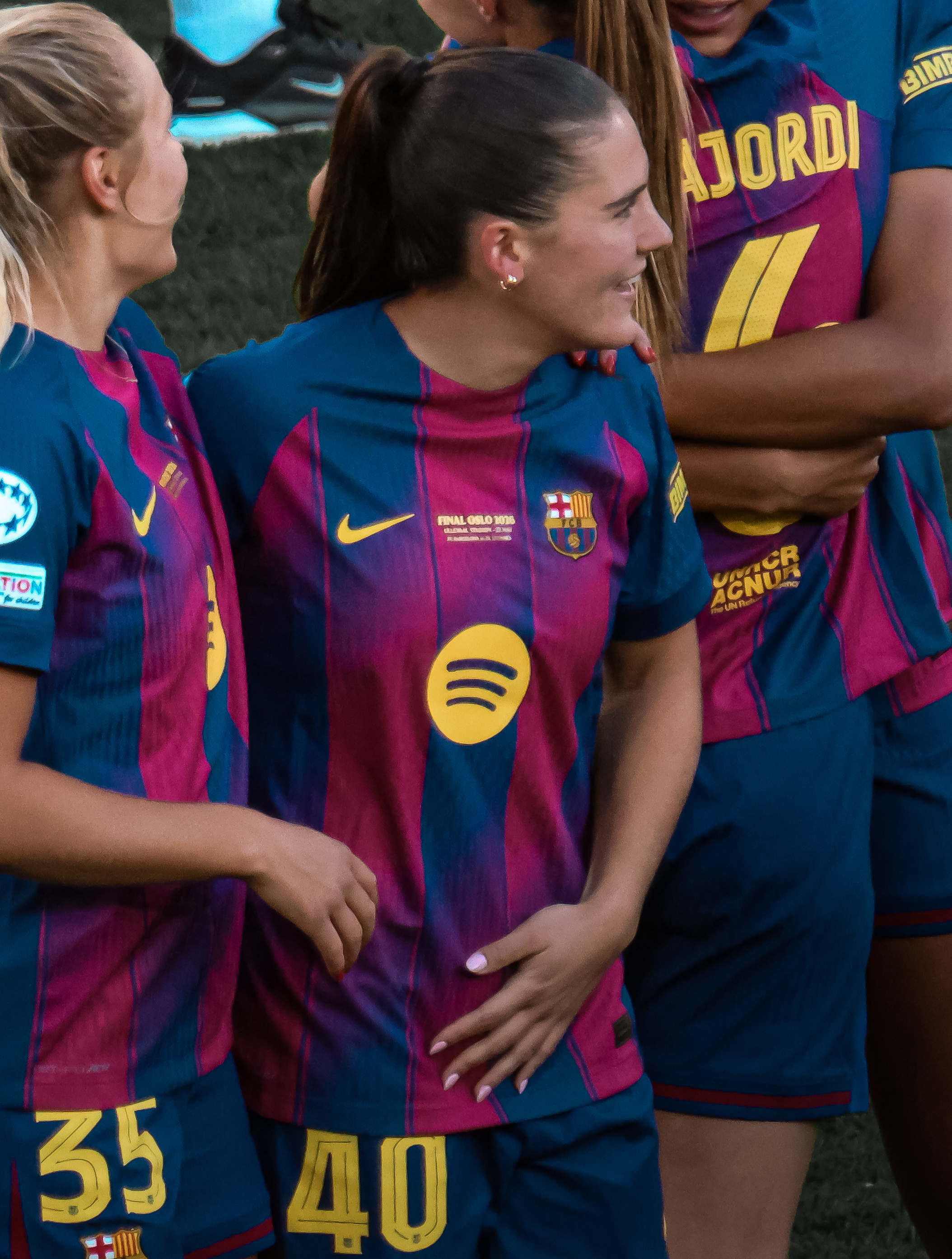
- Ranera (number 40) with Barcelona in 2026

Personal information
- Full name: Adriana Ranera Casanovas
- Date of birth: 7 July 2005 (age 21)
- Place of birth: Sant Cugat del Vallès, Spain
- Height: 1.65 m (5 ft 5 in)
- Position: Centre-back

Team information
- Current team: Deportivo de A Coruña

Senior career*
| Years | Team | Apps | (Gls) |
| 2021–2026 | Barcelona B | | |
| 2025– | Barcelona | 7 | (0) |
| 2026– | → Deportivo de A Coruña (loan) | | |

International career
| 2021–2022 | Spain U17 | 5 | (0) |
| 2023–2024 | Spain U19 | 11 | (1) |
| 2024 | Spain U20 | 1 | (0) |
- * Club domestic league appearances and goals

Adriana Ranera Casanovas (born 7 July 2005) is a Spanish professional footballer who plays as a centre-back for Liga F club Deportivo de A Coruña, on loan from Barcelona.

== Club career ==
=== Youth career ===
Ranera began her career at Junior FC, at the age of 6, in the pre-teen category and later the junior, alevín and infantile categories, always playing with boys. She then signed for CF Damm. At the age of 15, she signed for Barcelona's youth team.

=== Barcelona ===
Ranera became part of Barcelona B in the 2021-22 season at the age of 15. She made her debut with the first team in the semi-finals of the Copa Catalunya on 7 February 2025. She began the 2025-26 season as a reserve team player and made her debut in a Copa de la Reina match on 21 December 2025. She later made her debut in the Liga F on 8 February 2026.

On 16 July 2026, Ranera was loaned to Deportivo de A Coruña.

== International career ==
Ranera was part of the Spain U-17 squad that finished runner-up in the 2022 UEFA U-17 Championship.

In July 2024, Ranera was part of the Spain U-19 squad that won the 2024 UEFA U-19 Championship. She has also played matches with the Catalonia national team in different categories.

== Honours ==
Barcelona

- Copa Catalunya: 2024–25
- Liga F: 2025–26
- Copa de la Reina: 2025–26
- UEFA Women's Champions League: 2025–26

Barcelona B

- Primera Federación: 2022–23, 2023–24, 2025–26

Spain U17

- UEFA Women's Under-17 Championship runner-up: 2022

Spain U19

- UEFA Women's Under-19 Championship: 2024
