= Berta Pujadas =

Spanish footballer (born 2000)

Personal information
- Full name: Berta Pujadas Boix
- Date of birth: 9 April 2000 (age 26)
- Place of birth: Barcelona, Spain
- Height: 1.72 m (5 ft 8 in)
- Position: Centre back

Team information
- Current team: Valencia
- Number: 2

Senior career*
Years	Team	Apps	(Gls)
2015–2017	Barcelona B		
2017–2019	Espanyol	49	(1)
2019–	Valencia	91	(5)

International career^{‡}
2015–2017	Spain U17	19	(1)
2017–2019	Spain U19	11	(0)
2018	Spain U20	6	(0)
2022	Spain U23	2	(0)
2023–2024	Spain	3	(0)
2017–	Catalonia	2	(0)
- * Club domestic league appearances and goals as of 06:05, 23 December 2023 (UTC) ‡ National team caps and goals as of 06:05, 23 December 2025 (UTC)

Berta Pujadas Boix (born 9 April 2000) is a Spanish professional footballer who plays as a centre back for Liga F club Valencia CF and the Spain women's national team.

== Club career ==
Pujadas started her career at Barcelona B.
