= Queralt Gómez =

Spanish footballer (born 1997)

Personal information
- Full name: Queralt Gómez Sariol
- Date of birth: 27 May 1997 (age 29)
- Place of birth: Mollet del Vallès, Spain
- Height: 1.72 m (5 ft 8 in)
- Position: Defender

Team information
- Current team: CE Seagull Badalona
- Number: 24

Senior career*
Years	Team	Apps	(Gls)
2012–2013	Espanyol B		
2013–2015	Barcelona B		
2015–2016	Igualada		
2016–2020	Seagull	22+	
2020–2022	Eibar	43	(2)
2022–2023	Apollon		(12)
2023–2024	Villarreal CF		
2025–	CE Seagull Badalona		

International career
2013–2014	Spain U17	7	(0)
- * Club domestic league appearances and goals as of 4 June 2022

Queralt Gómez Sariol (born 27 May 1997) is a Spanish footballer who plays as a defender for CE Seagull Badalona.

== Club career ==
Gómez started her career at Espanyol B.
