= Júlia Bartel =

Spanish footballer (born 2004)

Personal information
- Full name: Júlia Bartel Holgado
- Date of birth: 18 May 2004 (age 22)
- Place of birth: Castellbisbal, Spain
- Height: 1.61 m (5 ft 3 in)
- Position: Midfielder

Team information
- Current team: Juventus
- Number: 14

Youth career
- 2017–2019: Espanyol
- 2019–2020: Barcelona

Senior career*
Years	Team	Apps	(Gls)
2019–2024	Barcelona B	104	(13)
2021–2024	Barcelona	4	(0)
2024–2026	Chelsea	0	(0)
2025	→ Liverpool (loan)	5	(0)
2025–2026	→ Atlético Madrid (loan)	27	(5)
2026–	Juventus	0	(0)

International career^{‡}
2018–2019	Spain U16	6	(1)
2019–2020	Spain U17	10	(0)
2021–2023	Spain U19	28	(6)
2021–2024	Spain U20	20	(2)
2023–2026	Spain U23	11	(0)
Medal record
Women's football
Representing Spain
FIFA U-20 Women's World Cup
Winner	2022 Costa Rica
UEFA Women's Under-19 Championship
Winner	2022 Czech Republic
Winner	2023 Belgium
- * Club domestic league appearances and goals as of 09:20, 26 August 2025 (UTC) ‡ National team caps and goals as of 09:20, 26 August 2025 (UTC)

Júlia Bartel Holgado (Spanish: [ˈxulja βaɾˈtel olˈɣaðo]; born 18 May 2004) is a Spanish footballer who plays as a midfielder for Serie A club Juventus and represents Spain national under-23 team.

== Club career ==
Bartel played for amateur clubs such as UE Castellbisbal and Sant Cugat FC as a junior before joining Espanyol's youth team. In 2019 she chose to sign with Barcelona when she was 15 years old.

After two years playing for youth and reserve teams of the club, she made her debut for the first team on 27 June 2021 against Eibar (replacing Vicky Losada who was playing her final game for the club); at 17 years and one month old, Bartel became the fourth-youngest player to have ever played for the main team. On 16 April 2022, in her third game and first start, Bartel made an assist against Valencia for a goal scored by Aitana Bonmatí.

She played exclusively for the B-team in the 2022–23 season, something which continued in the first half of 2023–24, though she made her UEFA Women's Champions League debut on 13 December 2023 as Barcelona defeated FC Rosengård 6–0 in Sweden.

On 27 June 2024, Bartel announced she was leaving Barcelona; it had previously been reported that Women's Super League champions Chelsea would be signing her. On 3 July, Bartel signed a three-year contract with Chelsea, with the option to extend for an additional year. For the second half of the 2024–25 season, Bartel was loaned to Liverpool on 9 January 2025. She was then loaned to Atlético Madrid for the 2025–26 season on 26 August 2025.

On 11 July 2026, it was announced that Bartel had signed a three-year contract with Serie A club Juventus until 30 June 2029 and would wear the number 14 shirt. She scored UEFA Women's Champions League goal against FK Austria Wien on 29 October 2026.

== International career ==
Despite the COVID-19 pandemic delaying major youth national tournaments in 2020, Bartel has amassed extensive experience playing for many junior levels of Spain's national team. She scored an impressive goal against Portugal on 9 April 2022, and was one of the key proponents for Spain to reach the final round of 2022 UEFA Championship, having appeared in all six games played by Spain throughout the qualification phase.

== Career statistics ==
=== Club ===
As of match played 31 May 2026

Appearances and goals by club, season and competition
Club	Season	League			Cup (Note: Appearances in Copa de la Reina)		Continental (Note: Appearances in UEFA Women's Champions League)		Other		Total	
Club	Season	Division	Apps	Goals	Apps	Goals	Apps	Goals	Apps	Goals	Apps	Goals
Barcelona B	2019–20	Segunda División Pro	2	0	—		—		—		2	0
Barcelona B	2020–21	Segunda División Pro	22	2	—		—		—		22	2
Barcelona B	2021–22	Segunda División Pro	28	3	—		—		—		28	3
Barcelona B	2022–23	Primera Federación	30	4	—		—		—		30	4
Barcelona B	2023–24	Primera Federación	22	4	—		—		—		22	4
Barcelona B	Total		104	13	—		—		—		104	13
Barcelona	2020–21	Primera División	1	0	0	0	0	0	0	0	1	0
Barcelona	2021–22	Primera División	2	0	0	0	0	0	0	0	2	0
Barcelona	2023–24	Liga F	1	0	0	0	1	0	0	0	2	0
Barcelona	Total		4	0	0	0	1	0	0	0	5	0
Chelsea	2024–25	Women's Super League	0	0	0	0	2	0	—		2	0
Liverpool (loan)	2024–25	Women's Super League	5	0	2	0	—		—		7	0
Atlético Madrid (loan)	2025–26	Liga F	27	5	6	0	10	1	0	0	43	6
Career total			140	18	8	0	13	1	0	0	161	19

== Honours ==
Barcelona B

- Primera Federación: 2022–23, 2023–24

Barcelona

- Liga F: 2023–24
- UEFA Women's Champions League: 2023–24

Juventus

- Serie A Women's Cup: 2026

Spain U19

- UEFA Women's Under-19 Championship: 2022, 2023

Spain U20

- FIFA U-20 Women's World Cup: 2022

Individual

- UEFA Women's Under-19 Championship Team of the Tournament: 2023
