= Mariona Caldentey =

Spanish footballer (born 1996)

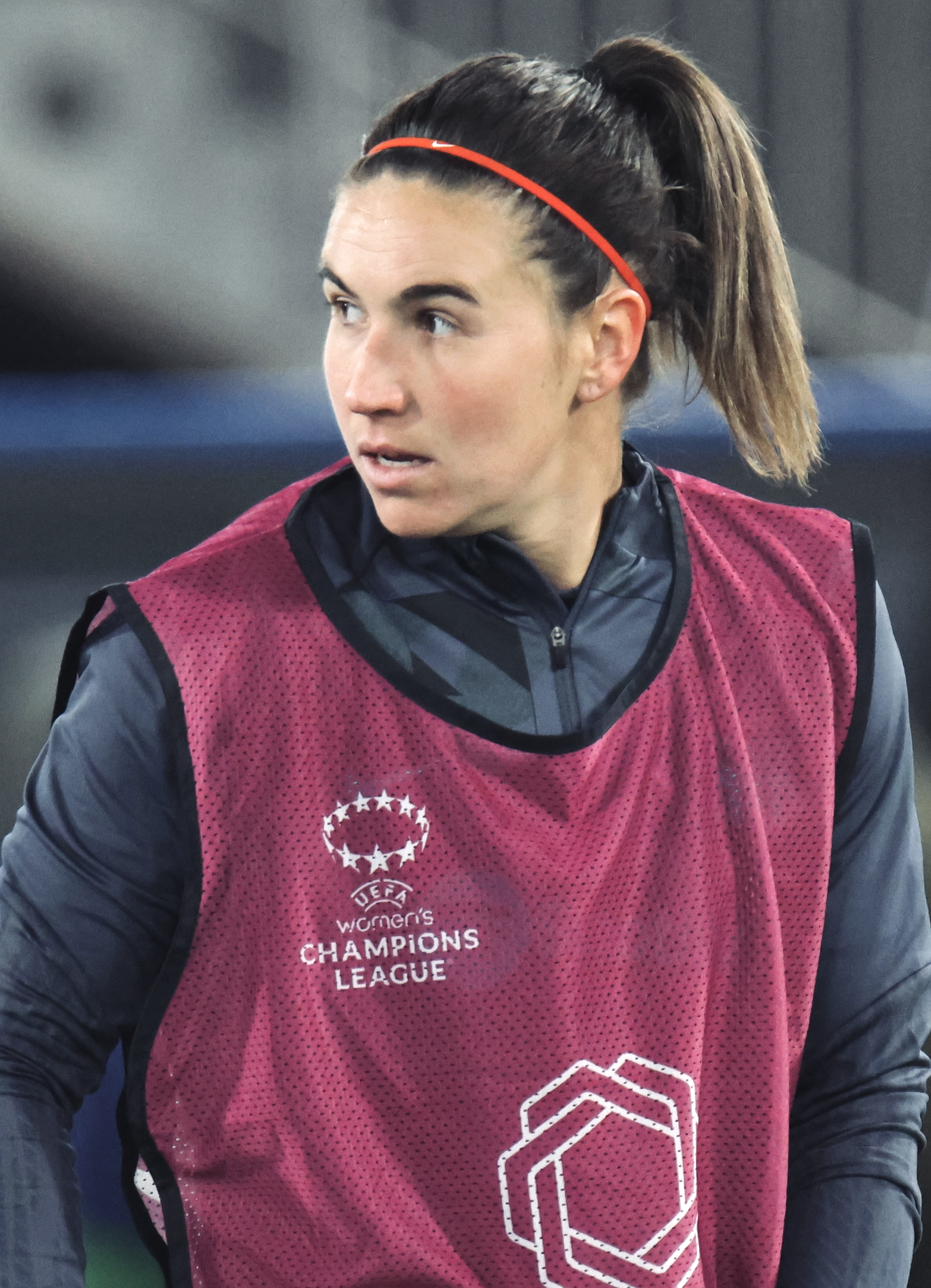
- Caldentey with Barcelona in 2024

Personal information
- Full name: Maria Francesca Caldentey Oliver
- Date of birth: 19 March 1996 (age 30)
- Place of birth: Felanitx, Mallorca, Spain
- Height: 1.64 m (5 ft 5 in)
- Positions: Forward; attacking midfielder

Team information
- Current team: Arsenal
- Number: 8

Youth career
- Felanitx
- Club Estudiantes CIDE
- 2010–2012: Collerense

Senior career*
| Years | Team | Apps | (Gls) |
| 2011–2012 | Collerense B | | |
| 2011–2014 | Collerense | 68 | (17) |
| 2014–2024 | Barcelona | 203 | (73) |
| 2024– | Arsenal | 48 | (13) |

International career^{‡}
| 2013 | Spain U17 | 2 | (1) |
| 2014–2015 | Spain U19 | 14 | (12) |
| 2016 | Spain U20 | 4 | (2) |
| 2017– | Spain | 104 | (31) |
Medal record
Women's football
Representing Spain
FIFA Women's World Cup
| Winner | 2023 Australia–New Zealand |
UEFA Women's Championship
| Runner-up | 2025 Switzerland |
UEFA Women's Nations League
| Winner | 2024 France–Netherlands–Spain |
UEFA Women's Under-17 Championship
| Runner-up | 2014 England |
- * Club domestic league appearances and goals as of 23:10, 4 October 2026 (UTC) ‡ National team caps and goals as of 16:45, 6 September 2026 (UTC)

Maria Francesca Caldentey Oliver (Catalan: [məˈɾi.ə fɾənˈsəs.kə kəl.dənˈtej o.liˈve]; (Note: This is the pronunciation used in Balearic Catalan, the dialect spoken in Caldentey's birthplace of Mallorca.) born 19 March 1996), known as Mariona Caldentey, (Note: In isolation, Mariona is pronounced (Catalan: [mə.ɾiˈo.nə])) is a Spanish professional footballer who plays as a forward or attacking midfielder for Women's Super League club Arsenal and the Spain national team. Prior to moving to the English side, Caldentey played for Barcelona, making 305 appearances, scoring 115 goals and winning 25 trophies during her 10-year stay at the club.

== Early and personal life ==
Maria Francesca Caldentey Oliver was born in the Mallorcan town of Felanitx to Miquel Àngel "Morete" Caldentey Bennásar and Maria Oliver. Her father was a football coach and her mother is a nurse by profession. She has an older brother. Caldentey was taught by her grandmother, also named Maria, how to play the piano.

Caldentey began playing football at the age of four in her local team as an after-school activity. She later played futsal in Manacor, where she won multiple titles and played in three Spanish championships. Although Mariona did not develop in La Masia, she has had a lifelong connection to FC Barcelona: her father was one of the original members and promoters of Els Tamarells, the largest Barcelona penya. He had been president of CE Felanitx after coaching the team (among others), and died suddenly while travelling in 2018.

In 2013, after she won bronze at the 2013 UEFA U-17 Championship, Felanitx town hall placed a plaque in honour of Caldentey. Els Tamarells began a campaign to rename the municipal pitch where CE Felanitx play after Caldentey in July 2018, and this ultimately happened in 2020; the Camp de Futbol Es Torrentó Mariona Caldentey Oliver was the first public space in Felanitx to be named after a woman.

As of 2019, Mariona was studying Sport and Exercise Science.

== Club career ==
=== Felanitx ===
Caldentey began her football career in the youth ranks of CD Felanitx. The staff who registered her there took her name down as the masculine Mariano instead; Caldentey was the only girl at the club throughout her time there, but never felt excluded or weird. At under-8 (pre-benjamín) level, Caldentey won the Spanish championship with Felanitx. Though her youth coaches felt she was not the best at any one thing, "she was a 9 in everything", which made her indispensable. Mariona was already a versatile player and was fielded in all positions.

When Mariona was nine, she began playing futsal alongside football, taking part in both sports until she was twelve. Caldentey then played football at Club Estudiantes CIDE (associated with the Palma Centre Internacional d'Educació).

Felanitx presented Caldentey with an honorary shirt with her club number, and had her take the kick-off for their Trofeo Ciudad de Felanitx match against Ferriolense, in August 2013.

=== Collerense ===
Caldentey joined her first girls' team at the age of fourteen at UD Collerense, which played in the top flight of Spanish football at the time. Mariona had only taken part in two training sessions before picking up her first injury, something she would be plagued with throughout her senior career. Caldentey was involved in the Collerense youth system, though played for the first team. Training sessions took place in the evenings, with Mariona travelling 50 minutes each way every day from Felanitx and returning home at almost midnight.

In the 2010–11 season, she played in two games for the first team: she came on as a substitute at half time in a league match, at 14 years old, and made a 16-minute substitute appearance in the Copa de la Reina aged 15. In the 2011–12 season, she played 21 league games and scored two goals for the first team. Caldentey would later describe Collerense as a community team; relying on local talent around the Mallorcan capital meant that players became integral at a young age, but this experience set them up for success. She became a regular starter in the 2012–13 season, playing 22 matches (21 as starter) and scoring seven goals. By 2013, Última Hora dubbed Mariona and teammate Patricia Guijarro as "the pride of Collerense" and the newspaper considered them to be among the best Balearic footballers, despite both being younger than 17.

In Caldentey's last Collerense match, against Athletic Club, she received a blow to the face and her nose was broken. She was taken off in the 28th minute and needed surgery.

=== Barcelona ===
On 30 July 2014, Caldentey signed for Barcelona, the reigning Copa de la Reina and Primera División champions, after her success in the 2014 U-19 European Championship with Spain. She was the team's fourth summer signing, with Barcelona's first match of the 2014–15 season to be against Collerense. Mariona made her Barça debut during the 2014–15 season, aged 18. She played in the quarter-finals of the 2015 Copa de la Reina, scoring in the 4–0 win versus Levante, before Barça were knocked out in the semi-finals.

On 2 June 2018, Mariona scored a dramatic 122nd-minute winning goal in the Copa de la Reina final against Atlético Madrid as Barça won 1–0 and lifted the cup. Mariona suffered various injuries in her time at Barcelona, missing out on chunks of some seasons and not always being able to show her best level. However, when available and playing as an inside forward, Caldentey was key to this area of the team's formation and contributed to all aspects of the attack.

Mariona arguably produced the best season of her career to date in the 2020–21 campaign, scoring 17 goals and playing 47 matches in all competitions (both career-best totals at that time) as Barcelona became the first Spanish women's club to win the continental treble of the Primera División (Spanish league), UEFA Women's Champions League and Copa de la Reina. She came on in the 62nd-minute of Barça's 4–0 Champions League final win against Chelsea on 16 May 2021.

On 4 November, Mariona signed a two-year contract extension to remain at Barcelona until June 2024. During her years at Barça, Caldentey developed into a player who could play in any position up front or in midfield due to her strong tactical understanding of the game and her world-class technical ability.

Towards the end of what Sport called her best season for Barcelona, and one in which they won everything (the quadruple), Caldentey announced on 5 June 2024 that she would be leaving the club at the end of the season. She ended her time at Barça with a top performance in the 2–0 2024 Champions League final victory against Lyon, assisting the game's opening goal by Aitana Bonmatí. Mariona's strong form in her final year with Barcelona saw her finish in eighth place in the 2024 Ballon d'Or rankings. Having spent ten years at the club, Mariona was among Barcelona's top players for total appearances (303); goals (115, the fifth highest in club history); trophies (25 trophies, the fourth most) and left the club as a true legend.

=== Arsenal ===
On 2 July 2024, English club Arsenal announced the signing of Caldentey on a free transfer. Mariona said that leaving Spain had been a tough decision, but also suggested that Spanish players in general were considering similar moves as she felt Spanish women's domestic football was stagnating despite their 2023 World Cup success.

Mariona produced fantastic performances during her first campaign in England, both in an attacking sense and when she moved into a deeper midfield role alongside club captain Kim Little in the final few months of the season. She scored 19 goals and provided ten assists across all competitions as Arsenal finished second in the Women's Super League and triumphed in Europe.

On 11 May 2025, it was announced that Caldentey had won the inaugural WSL Player of the Season award. She was also voted by Arsenal fans as the club's 2024–25 Women's Player of the Season. Her long-range curler in Arsenal's 4–1 away victory over Lyon in the Champions League semi-final was voted as the 2024–25 Goal of the Tournament. Later that month, on 24 May, she won the Champions League final with Arsenal 1–0 against her former club, Barcelona, extending her titles in the competition to three-in-a-row for a total of four overall. She was included in UEFA's Team of the Season.

Mariona's superb season with both club and country saw her receive more acclaim. In August, she was announced as the PFA Women's Players' Player of the Year for 2024–25. She then came extremely close to winning the 2025 Ballon d'Or, but she was narrowly beaten by 28 "points" by her former Barcelona teammate Bonmatí (506 points) and finished in second place (478 points). Caldentey received 15 first-place votes from the journalists that voted for the award, which was actually three more than Bonmatí. However, Bonmatí appeared 49 times in journalists' "top 10" rankings, compared to 44 for Mariona, and hence just pipped her compatriot to the Ballon d'Or.

== International career ==
=== Youth ===
Caldentey was called up the Spain under-16 team for a camp in November 2011. She had already played for the under-16 Balearic Islands team.

Caldentey earned third place at the 2013 U-17 European Championship, representing Spain. In the semifinals of the tournament, she converted her penalty in the shootout against Sweden, but would end up losing the match after the shootout ended 4–5 in Sweden's favor. In the third place match, Caldentey captained the team and scored in the 42nd minute in an 0–4 rout of Belgium.

She was called up to the under-19 team for the first time in October 2013, and played for them at the 2014 U-19 European Championship. Mariona started every game in the tournament, and scored the first goal in the semifinal match against Norway. She started in the final, which Spain lost to the Netherlands.

Caldentey also participated in the 2016 U20 World Cup, where she scored twice in the group stage against Canada and Japan. Spain were eliminated in extra time of the quarterfinal against eventual champions North Korea. Her goal against Canada was named goal of the tournament.

=== Senior ===
In 2017, Mariona earned her first senior national team call-up when Jorge Vilda named her to Spain's squad for two friendlies against Switzerland. Two months later, she made her international debut in an Algarve Cup match versus Japan, subbing on in the 73rd minute for Amanda Sampedro. Spain went on to the final against Canada and won the tournament, earning Caldentey her first international title.

Caldentey scored her first senior international goal in a friendly match against Belgium.

Mariona was called up to the squad for the Euro 2017. Caldentey started in two group stages games – a win against Portugal and a loss against Scotland. After Spain qualified for the knockout rounds on their head-to-head record, she started the quarterfinal match against Austria but was subbed out in the 56th minute. Spain exited the tournament after a penalty shootout.

In 2019, Caldentey was called up to represent Spain in the 2019 Algarve Cup, where Spain finished 7th place. She was also named to the Spain squad for the 2019 World Cup. She started each match in the group stage of the tournament, where Spain received four points and moved on to the Round of 16 for the first time in their history. In the Round of 16 match, she subbed in at the 83rd minute for Virginia Torrecilla, and Spain would end up losing to eventual champions, the United States.

She was among Las 15, a group of players who made themselves unavailable for international selection in September 2022 due to their dissatisfaction with head coach Jorge Vilda, but one of three who was selected for the tournament squad nine months later. She was in the starting line-up for the 2023 FIFA Women's World Cup final as Spain defeated England 1–0 to win the trophy for the first time.

Caldentey was part of the Spanish squad for Euro 2025. She was a key player for Spain, scoring two goals, providing two assists and starting all six of their matches at the tournament. On 27 July 2025, Mariona started in the Euro 2025 final against England and scored the first goal of the match, but she was one of three Spaniards to fail to score in the penalty shootout, resulting in Spain finishing as runners-up.

== Career statistics ==
=== Club ===
As of match played 4 October 2026

Appearances and goals by club, season and competition
| Club | Season | League | | | National cup (Note: Includes Copa de la Reina de Fútbol, Women's FA Cup) | | League cup (Note: Includes FA Women's League Cup) | | UWCL | | Other | | Total | |
| Club | Season | Division | Apps | Goals | Apps | Goals | Apps | Goals | Apps | Goals | Apps | Goals | Apps | Goals |
|---|---|---|---|---|---|---|---|---|---|---|---|---|---|---|
| Collerense | 2010–11 | Superliga Femenina | 1 | 0 | 1 | 0 | — | | — | | — | | 2 | 0 |
| Collerense | 2011–12 | Primera División | 21 | 2 | 0 | 0 | — | | — | | — | | 21 | 2 |
| Collerense | 2012–13 | Primera División | 22 | 7 | 0 | 0 | — | | — | | — | | 22 | 7 |
| Collerense | 2013–14 | Primera División | 24 | 8 | 0 | 0 | — | | — | | — | | 24 | 8 |
| Collerense | Total | | 68 | 17 | 1 | 0 | — | | — | | — | | 69 | 17 |
| Barcelona | 2014–15 | Primera División | 26 | 11 | 2 | 1 | — | | 3 | 0 | — | | 31 | 12 |
| Barcelona | 2015–16 | Primera División | 13 | 2 | 0 | 0 | — | | 0 | 0 | — | | 13 | 2 |
| Barcelona | 2016–17 | Primera División | 18 | 3 | 3 | 0 | — | | 4 | 1 | — | | 25 | 4 |
| Barcelona | 2017–18 | Primera División | 14 | 8 | 4 | 2 | — | | 5 | 3 | — | | 23 | 13 |
| Barcelona | 2018–19 | Primera División | 20 | 9 | 1 | 0 | — | | 7 | 2 | — | | 28 | 11 |
| Barcelona | 2019–20 | Primera División | 17 | 6 | 4 | 0 | — | | 6 | 1 | 2 (Note: Appearances in Supercopa de España Femenina) | 0 | 29 | 7 |
| Barcelona | 2020–21 | Primera División | 34 | 13 | 3 | 2 | — | | 9 | 2 | 1 | 0 | 47 | 17 |
| Barcelona | 2021–22 | Primera División | 15 | 6 | 2 | 1 | — | | 7 | 1 | 0 | 0 | 24 | 8 |
| Barcelona | 2022–23 | Liga F | 19 | 6 | 1 | 1 | — | | 8 | 4 | 2 | 1 | 30 | 12 |
| Barcelona | 2023–24 | Liga F | 27 | 9 | 5 | 6 | — | | 11 | 2 | 2 | 2 | 45 | 19 |
| Barcelona | Total | | 203 | 73 | 25 | 13 | — | | 60 | 16 | 7 | 3 | 295 | 105 |
| Arsenal | 2024–25 | WSL | 21 | 9 | 3 | 0 | 2 | 2 | 15 | 8 | — | | 41 | 19 |
| Arsenal | 2025–26 | WSL | 22 | 4 | 3 | 0 | 1 | 0 | 12 | 2 | 2 (Note: Appearances in FIFA Women's Champions Cup) | 1 | 40 | 7 |
| Arsenal | 2026–27 | WSL | 5 | 0 | 0 | 0 | — | | 2 | 1 | — | | 7 | 1 |
| Arsenal | Total | | 48 | 13 | 6 | 0 | 3 | 2 | 29 | 11 | 2 | 1 | 88 | 27 |
| Career total | | | 319 | 103 | 32 | 13 | 10 | 5 | 89 | 27 | 2 | 1 | 452 | 149 |

=== International ===
As of match played 9 June 2026

Appearances and goals by national team and year
| National team | Year | Apps | Goals |
|---|---|---|---|
| Spain | 2017 | 11 | 2 |
| Spain | 2018 | 2 | 0 |
| Spain | 2019 | 16 | 1 |
| Spain | 2020 | 6 | 4 |
| Spain | 2021 | 11 | 10 |
| Spain | 2022 | 8 | 2 |
| Spain | 2023 | 12 | 4 |
| Spain | 2024 | 16 | 5 |
| Spain | 2025 | 17 | 3 |
| Spain | 2026 | 5 | 0 |
| Total | | 104 | 31 |

Scores and results list Spain's goal tally first, score column indicates score after each Caldentey goal.

List of international goals scored by Mariona Caldentey
| No. | Date | Venue | Opponent | Score | Result | Competition |
|---|---|---|---|---|---|---|
| 1 | 30 June 2017 | Pinatar Arena, San Pedro del Pinatar, Spain | Belgium | 4–0 | 7–0 | Friendly |
| 2 | 18 September 2017 | Stade de l'Épopée, Calais, France | France | 1–2 | 1–3 | Friendly |
| 3 | 8 October 2019 | Ďolíček, Prague, Czech Republic | Czech Republic | 2–0 | 5–1 | UEFA Women's Euro 2022 qualifying |
| 4 | 19 September 2020 | Zimbru Stadium, Chișinău, Moldova | Moldova | 3–0 | 9–0 | UEFA Women's Euro 2022 qualifying |
| 5 | 19 September 2020 | Zimbru Stadium, Chișinău, Moldova | Moldova | 7–0 | 9–0 | UEFA Women's Euro 2022 qualifying |
| 6 | 19 September 2020 | Zimbru Stadium, Chișinău, Moldova | Moldova | 9–0 | 9–0 | UEFA Women's Euro 2022 qualifying |
| 7 | 27 November 2020 | La Ciudad del Fútbol, Las Rozas de Madrid, Spain | Moldova | 4–0 | 10–0 | UEFA Women's Euro 2022 qualifying |
| 8 | 18 February 2021 | ASK Arena, Baku, Azerbaijan | Azerbaijan | 7–0 | 13–0 | UEFA Women's Euro 2022 qualifying |
| 9 | 10 June 2021 | Estadio Municipal de Santo Domingo, Alcorcón, Spain | Belgium | 1-0 | 3–0 | Friendly |
| 10 | 16 September 2021 | Tórsvøllur, Tórshavn, Faroes | Faroe Islands | 9–0 | 10–0 | 2023 FIFA Women's World Cup qualification |
| 11 | 21 September 2021 | Hidegkuti Nándor Stadion, Budapest, Hungary | Hungary | 3–0 | 7–0 | 2023 FIFA Women's World Cup qualification |
| 12 | 21 September 2021 | Hidegkuti Nándor Stadion, Budapest, Hungary | Hungary | 7–0 | 7–0 | 2023 FIFA Women's World Cup qualification |
| 13 | 25 November 2021 | Estadio de La Cartuja, Seville, Spain | Faroe Islands | 4–0 | 12–0 | 2023 FIFA Women's World Cup qualification |
| 14 | 25 November 2021 | Estadio de La Cartuja, Seville, Spain | Faroe Islands | 8–0 | 12–0 | 2023 FIFA Women's World Cup qualification |
| 15 | 25 November 2021 | Estadio de La Cartuja, Seville, Spain | Faroe Islands | 9–0 | 12–0 | 2023 FIFA Women's World Cup qualification |
| 16 | 30 November 2021 | Estadio de La Cartuja, Seville, Spain | Scotland | 2–0 | 8–0 | 2023 FIFA Women's World Cup qualification |
| 17 | 30 November 2021 | Estadio de La Cartuja, Seville, Spain | Scotland | 8–0 | 8–0 | 2023 FIFA Women's World Cup qualification |
| 18 | 25 June 2022 | Nuevo Colombino, Huelva, Spain | Australia | 2–0 | 7–0 | Friendly |
| 19 | 8 July 2022 | Stadium MK, Milton Keynes, England | Finland | 4–1 | 4–1 | UEFA Women's Euro 2022 |
| 20 | 11 August 2023 | Wellington Regional Stadium, Wellington, New Zealand | Netherlands | 1–0 | 2–1 | 2023 FIFA Women's World Cup |
| 21 | 22 September 2023 | Gamla Ullevi, Gothenburg, Sweden | Sweden | 3–2 | 3–2 | 2023–24 UEFA Women's Nations League |
| 22 | 5 December 2023 | La Rosaleda Stadium, Málaga, Spain | Sweden | 3–3 | 5–3 | 2023–24 UEFA Women's Nations League |
| 23 | 5 December 2023 | La Rosaleda Stadium, Málaga, Spain | Sweden | 5–3 | 5–3 | 2023–24 UEFA Women's Nations League |
| 24 | 23 February 2024 | Estadio de La Cartuja, Seville, Spain | France | 2–0 | 2–0 | 2024 UEFA Women's Nations League Finals |
| 25 | 9 April 2024 | Estadio El Plantío, Burgos, Spain | Czech Republic | 3–1 | 3–1 | UEFA Women's Euro 2025 qualifying |
| 26 | 31 May 2024 | Viborg Stadion, Viborg, Denmark | Denmark | 2–0 | 2–0 | UEFA Women's Euro 2025 qualifying |
| 27 | 25 July 2024 | Stade de la Beaujoire, Nantes, France | Japan | 2–1 | 2–1 | 2024 Summer Olympics |
| 28 | 3 December 2024 | Allianz Riviera, Nice, France | France | 4–2 | 4–2 | Friendly |
| 29 | 8 April 2025 | Balaídos, Vigo, Spain | Portugal | 5–0 | 7–1 | 2025 UEFA Women's Nations League |
| 30 | 7 July 2025 | Arena Thun, Thun, Switzerland | Belgium | 4–2 | 6–2 | UEFA Women's Euro 2025 |
| 31 | 27 July 2025 | St. Jakob-Park, Basel, Switzerland | England | 1–0 | 1–1 (a.e.t.) (1–3 p) | UEFA Women's Euro 2025 |

== Honours ==
Barcelona

- Primera División: 2014–15, 2019–20, 2020–21, 2021–22, 2022–23, 2023–24
- Copa de la Reina de Fútbol: 2017, 2018, 2019–20, 2020–21, 2023–24
- Supercopa Femenina: 2019–20, 2021–22, 2022–23, 2023–24
- Copa Catalunya: 2014, 2015, 2016, 2017
- UEFA Women's Champions League: 2020–21, 2022–23, 2023–24

Arsenal

- UEFA Women's Champions League: 2024–25
- FIFA Women's Champions Cup: 2026

Spain

- FIFA Women's World Cup: 2023
- UEFA Women's Championship runner-up: 2025
- UEFA Women's Nations League: 2023–24, 2025
- Algarve Cup: 2017

Spain U19

- UEFA Women's Under-19 Championship runner-up: 2014

Individual

- IFFHS Women's UEFA Team: 2023, 2024
- Premi Jaume II: 2017
- WSL Player of the Month: February 2025
- WSL Player of the Season: 2024–25
- PFA Women's Players' Player of the Year: 2024–25
- PFA WSL Team of the Year: 2024–25, 2025–26
- PFA WSL Fans' Player of the Month: March 2025
- UEFA Women's Champions League Goal of the Tournament: 2024–25
- UEFA Women's Champions League Team of the Season: 2024–25
