= Bruna Vilamala =

Spanish footballer (born 2002)

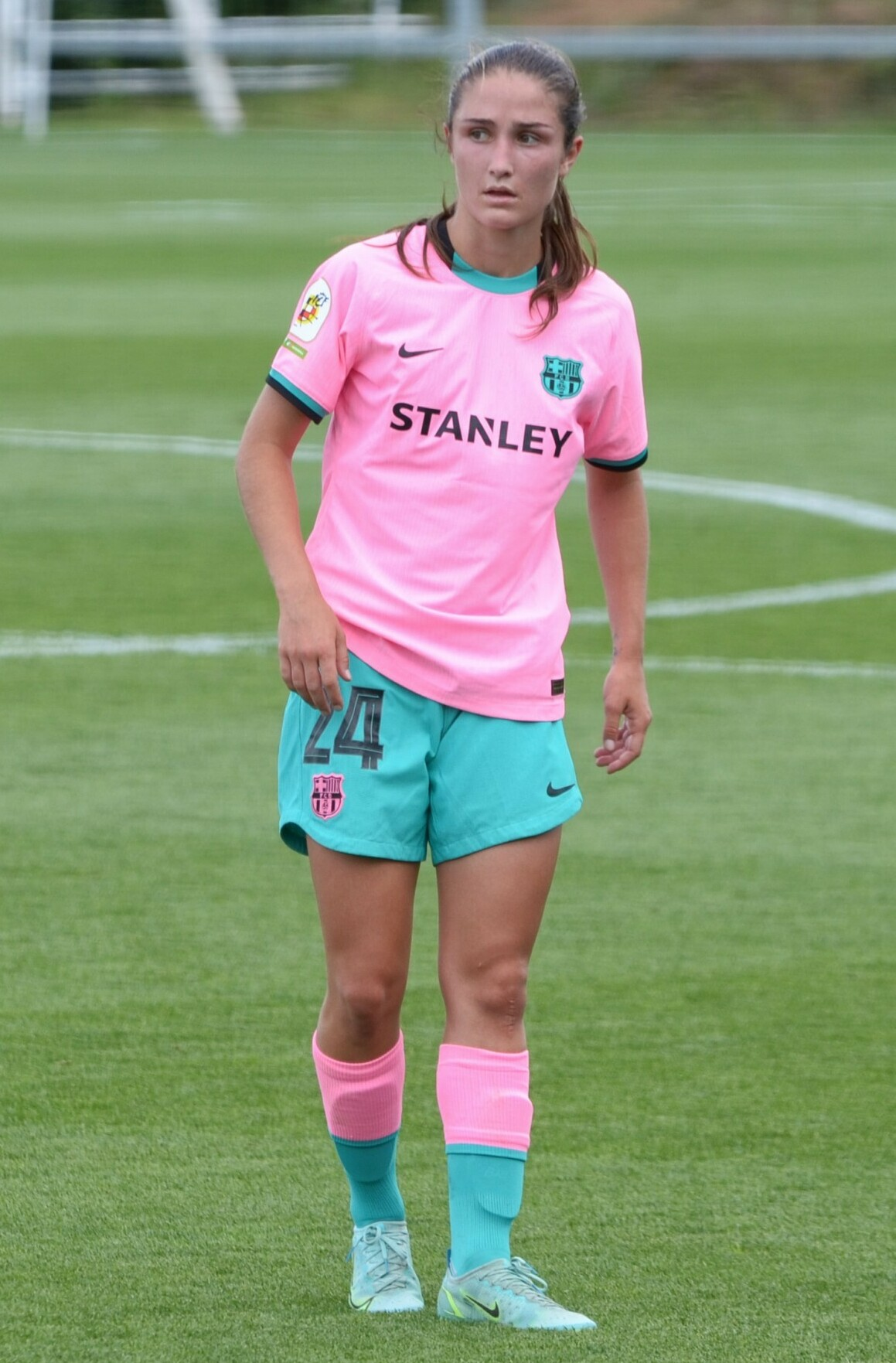
- Bruna with Barcelona in 2021

Personal information
- Full name: Bruna Vilamala Costa
- Date of birth: 4 June 2002 (age 24)
- Place of birth: Sant Vicenç de Torelló, Spain
- Height: 1.63 m (5 ft 4 in)
- Position: Forward

Team information
- Current team: América
- Number: 6

Youth career
- 2013–2019: Barcelona

Senior career*
Years	Team	Apps	(Gls)
2019–2021	Barcelona B	21	(12)
2020–2025	Barcelona	50	(20)
2024–2025	→ Brighton & Hove Albion (loan)	13	(1)
2025–	América	19	(6)

International career^{‡}
2018	Spain U17	5	(0)
2021–	Spain U23	7	(2)
2024–	Spain	3	(1)
2025–	Catalonia	1	(0)
- * Club domestic league appearances and goals as of 19 February 2026 ‡ National team caps and goals as of 20 April 2025 (UTC)

Bruna Vilamala Costa (Catalan: [ˈbɾunə βiləˈmalə ˈkɔstə]; born 4 June 2002) is a Spanish professional footballer from Catalonia who plays as a forward for Liga MX Femenil side Club América and the Spain women's national football team.

== Club career ==
=== Barcelona (2013–2025) ===
Born in the town of Borgonyà in the municipality of Sant Vicenç de Torelló, Vilamala joined the grassroots of Barcelona when she was only eleven years old.

In October 2018, Vilamala tore her ACL in a match against AEM Lleida.

She debuted with the Barça first team on 1 February 2020 against Sevilla at only 17 years of age, with Vilamala being the fourth youngest player to wear the shirt of the culés. During the 2020–21 season, she was a regular on the payrolls of the Barça first team despite the fact that she still had a filial role. On 18 October 2020, she scored her first goal in the Primera División in the 6-0 win against Sporting de Huelva. On 10 May 2021, she scored against Granadilla, which would be decisive in the 1-0 victory, with which they won the Liga Iberdrola title. In that season, Barcelona would end the best campaign in its history by winning the Liga, Copa de la Reina and Champions League titles. For her part, Vilamala would close the season with 12 goals converted in the Liga in just 15 games, being the sixth highest scorer of the culé campaign and the second with the best scoring average.

On 25 October 2021, Vilamala suffered the second ACL tear of her career during a friendly with Spain's under-23 national football team. She returned to playing on 20 November 2022 in a league game against Alavés, experiencing some setbacks before making more regular appearances in the 2023–24 season and slowly growing back to full fitness.

==== 2024–2025: Loan to Brighton ====
On 24 August 2024, Brighton & Hove Albion announced that they had agreed a deal to sign Vilamala on a season-long loan from Barcelona, subject to regulatory processes.

=== Club América (2025–2026) ===
On 16 July 2025, Barcelona announced that Vilamala would not be returning to the club after her loan to Brighton ended, and that she was instead being transferred to Club América of Liga MX Femenil after both clubs reached an agreement. América officially announced Vilamala as their new player later that day. She made her debut with America on 27 July 2025, coming in as a sub during a Apertura 2025 match against León.

On 1 December 2025, América announced that Vilamala had suffered an Anterior cruciate ligament injury on her left knee during a training session, the third such injury on her career, thus leaving her out of action for the remainder of the 2025–26 season.

== International career ==
In 2018, Vilamala was called up to the Spanish U-17 team to take part in the women's U-17 European Championship, which was held in Lithuania.

Vilamala made her senior Spain debut on her 22nd birthday, during a UEFA Women's Euro 2025 qualifying match against Denmark on 4 June 2024. Spain, ranked number one, were unusually trailing when Vilamala was substituted on; she scored their first goal (which she credited to Irene Paredes) as Spain mounted a 3–2 comeback victory to gain automatic qualification for Euro 2025.

== Career statistics ==
=== Club ===
As of 15 February 2026

Club	Season	League			Cup		Other		UWCL		Total	
Club	Season	Division	Apps	Goals	Apps	Goals	Apps	Goals	Apps	Goals	Apps	Goals
Barcelona B	2019–20	Segunda División	15	8	—		—		—		15	8
Barcelona B	2020–21	Segunda División	6	4	—		—		—		6	4
Barcelona B	Total		21	12	—		—		—		21	12
Barcelona	2019–20	Primera División	1	0	0	0	0	0	0	0	1	0
Barcelona	2020–21	Primera División	15	12	3	1	0	0	2	0	20	13
Barcelona	2021–22	Primera División	5	3	0	0	0	0	2	0	7	3
Barcelona	2022–23	Primera División	10	1	1	3	0	0	5	0	16	4
Barcelona	2023–24	Primera División	19	4	4	0	1 (Note: Appearances in Supercopa de España)	0	3	0	27	4
Barcelona	Total		50	20	8	4	1	0	12	0	71	24
Brighton & Hove Albion (loan)	2024–25	WSL	13	1	1 (Note: Appearances in Women's FA Cup)	1	3 (Note: Appearances in Women's League Cup)	1	—		17	3
Brighton & Hove Albion (loan)	Total		13	1	1	1	3	1	—		17	3
Club América	2025–26	Liga MX Femenil	19	6	—		4	2	—		23	8
Club América	Total		19	6	—		4	2	—		23	8
Career total			103	39	9	5	8	3	12	0	132	47

=== International ===
As of match played 3 December 2024

Appearances and goals by national team and year
National team	Year	Apps	Goals
Spain	2024	3	1
Total		3	1

Scores and results list Spain's goal tally first, score column indicates score after each Vilamala goal.

List of international goals scored by Bruna Vilamala
No.	Date	Venue	Opponent	Score	Result	Competition
1	4 June 2024	Estadio Heliodoro Rodríguez López, Tenerife, Spain	Denmark	1–2	3–2	UEFA Women's Euro 2025 qualifying

== Honours ==
Barcelona

- Liga F: 2020–21, 2021–22, 2022–23, 2023–24
- Copa de la Reina: 2020–21, 2021–22, 2023–24
- UEFA Women's Champions League: 2020–21, 2022–23, 2023–24
- Supercopa de España Femenina: 2021–22, 2023–24

Club América

- Liga MX Femenil: Clausura 2026
- CONCACAF W Champions Cup: 2025–26

Spain

- UEFA Women's Under-17 Championship: 2018
