= Ona Baradad =

Spanish footballer

Personal information
- Full name: Ona Baradad Rius
- Date of birth: 16 April 2004 (age 22)
- Place of birth: Rosselló, Lleida, Spain
- Positions: Winger; forward

Team information
- Current team: Espanyol
- Number: 11

Youth career
- 2011–2016: CE Mig Segrià
- 2016-2020: SE AEM Lleida

Senior career*
Years	Team	Apps	(Gls)
2019–2020	SE AEM Lleida	2	(3)
2020–2021	Barcelona B	42	(6)
2021–2025	Barcelona	7	(1)
2025–	Espanyol	12	(3)

International career
2019	Spain U-16	3	(0)
2019-2020	Spain U-17	1	(0)
2022-2023	Spain U-19	3	(2)
2021-2023	Spain U-20	2	(0)
Medal record
Women's football
Representing Spain
UEFA Women's Under-19 Championship
Winner	2022 Czech Republic
- * Club domestic league appearances and goals as of 25 November 2025

Ona Baradad Rius (born 16 April 2004) is a Spanish footballer who plays as a forward for RCD Espanyol.

== Club career ==
Baradad was signed up by CE Mig Segrià in 2011 when she was only 7 years old. She later joined SE AEM Lleida at the age of 12, and spent 4 years developing her game in the various levels of the club before joining Barcelona in 2020. After spending the 2020-2021 season playing for the "B" team, she finally made her debut for the first team on 10 November 2021 in Champions League against TSG Hoffenheim replacing Marta Torrejón on the 86th minutes. She scored her first goal for Barça on 6 March 2022 against Alavés in Primera División.

== International career ==
On 10 January 2019 Baradad was invited to participate in WU17 Atlantic Tournament for Spain. In that tournament she played 33 minutes against Slovakia.

Baradad was called up for the second round of 2022 UEFA U-19 Championship qualification alongside 7 other Barcelona teammates on 31 March 2022. She scored 2 goals in three games. Her goal against Netherland six minutes before the final whistle tied the match and saved Spain from being disqualified.

== Honours ==
Spain U19

- UEFA Women's Under-19 Championship: 2022
