= Viky Yavorova =

Spanish footballer (born 2003)

Viky Adrianova
Personal information
- Full name: Viky Adrianova Yavorova
- Date of birth: 12 May 2003 (age 23)
- Place of birth: Bulgaria,
- Position: Forward

Team information
- Current team: Jacksonville State University
- Number: 25

Youth career
- 2020–2023: Barcelona

College career
| Years | Team | Apps | (Gls) |
| 2023– | Jacksonville State University | | |

Senior career*
| Years | Team | Apps | (Gls) |
| 2021–2023 | FC Barcelona B | 7 | (3) |
| 2022–2023 | FC Barcelona C | | |

International career^{‡}
| 2023– | Bulgaria | 2 | (0) |
- * Club domestic league appearances and goals ‡ National team caps and goals as of 14 June 2019

Viktoria Adrianova Yavorova (Bulgarian: Виктория Адрианова Яворова; born 12 May 2003), known as Viky Yavorova, is a Bulgarian footballer who plays as a winger for Jacksonville State University and the Bulgaria women's national football team. Born in Bulgaria and raised in Spain to Bulgarian parents, she is a naturalised citizen of Spain; in 2023 she switched FIFA eligibility to play for Bulgaria. As a Spanish prospect, she was known as Viky Adrianova.

== Early and personal life ==
Yavorova was born in Bulgaria and moved to Spain with her family at the age of two. She started playing football at a young age, and futsal at the age of five. She has one older brother, one younger sister, and one younger brother.

== Club career ==
Yavorova was regarded as a Spanish prospect when she was signed with Barcelona. While playing for their youth academy, she combined football with academic studies. In 2021, she was honored for her academic performance.

Eventually, she was promoted to the reserve team of Barcelona. By 2022, she had received three surgeries for injuries throughout her career. During the 2022/23 season, she helped the B and C teams win the league.

== International career ==
In November 2023 she was called up to a senior camp for Bulgaria. She played in both of their December 2023 UEFA Women's Nations League games, against Kosovo and North Macedonia.

== Style of play ==
Yavorova mainly operates as a striker and is known for her speed.
