= Carla Armengol =

Spanish footballer (born 1998)

Personal information
- Full name: Carla Armengol Joaniquet
- Date of birth: 2 April 1998 (age 28)
- Place of birth: Sant Vicenç dels Horts, Spain
- Position: Forward

Team information
- Current team: Sporting CP
- Number: 20

Youth career
- 2013–2014: Barcelona

Senior career*
Years	Team	Apps	(Gls)
2014–2020	Barcelona B	18+	(12+)
2018–2021	Barcelona	1	(0)
2020–2021	→ Sevilla (loan)	23	(1)
–2021–2023	Alavés		
2023–2025	Real Betis		
2025–	Sporting CP		
- * Club domestic league appearances and goals as of 22:04, 7 February 2023 (UTC)

Carla Armengol Joaniquet (born 2 April 1998) is a Spanish footballer who plays as a forward for Sporting Clube de Portugal.

== Club career ==
Armengol started her career in Barcelona's academy. When she made her debut for the club in October 2019, she became only the second player from Barcelona's academy to play for the first team.
