= Arola Aparicio =

Spanish footballer (born 1997)

Personal information
- Full name: Arola Aparicio Gili
- Date of birth: 24 September 1997 (age 29)
- Place of birth: Sant Antoni de Vilamajor, Spain
- Position: Defender

Team information
- Current team: Real Sociedad
- Number: 19

Youth career
- 2011–2013: Sant Gabriel

Senior career*
Years	Team	Apps	(Gls)
2013–2015	Barcelona B		
2015–2019	Little Rock Trojans		
2019–2020	Barcelona B	21	(6)
2020–2022	Eibar	56	(11)
2022–2024	Sevilla	52	(1)
2024–2025	Espanyol	11	(1)
2025–	Real Sociedad	0	(0)

International career
2024–	Catalonia	2	(0)
- * Club domestic league appearances and goals as of 17:05, 24 November 2024 (UTC)

Arola Aparicio Gili (born 24 September 1997) is a Spanish footballer who plays as a defender for Real Sociedad.

== Club career ==
Aparicio started her career at Sant Gabriel's academy.
