= Candela Andújar =

Spanish footballer (born 2000)

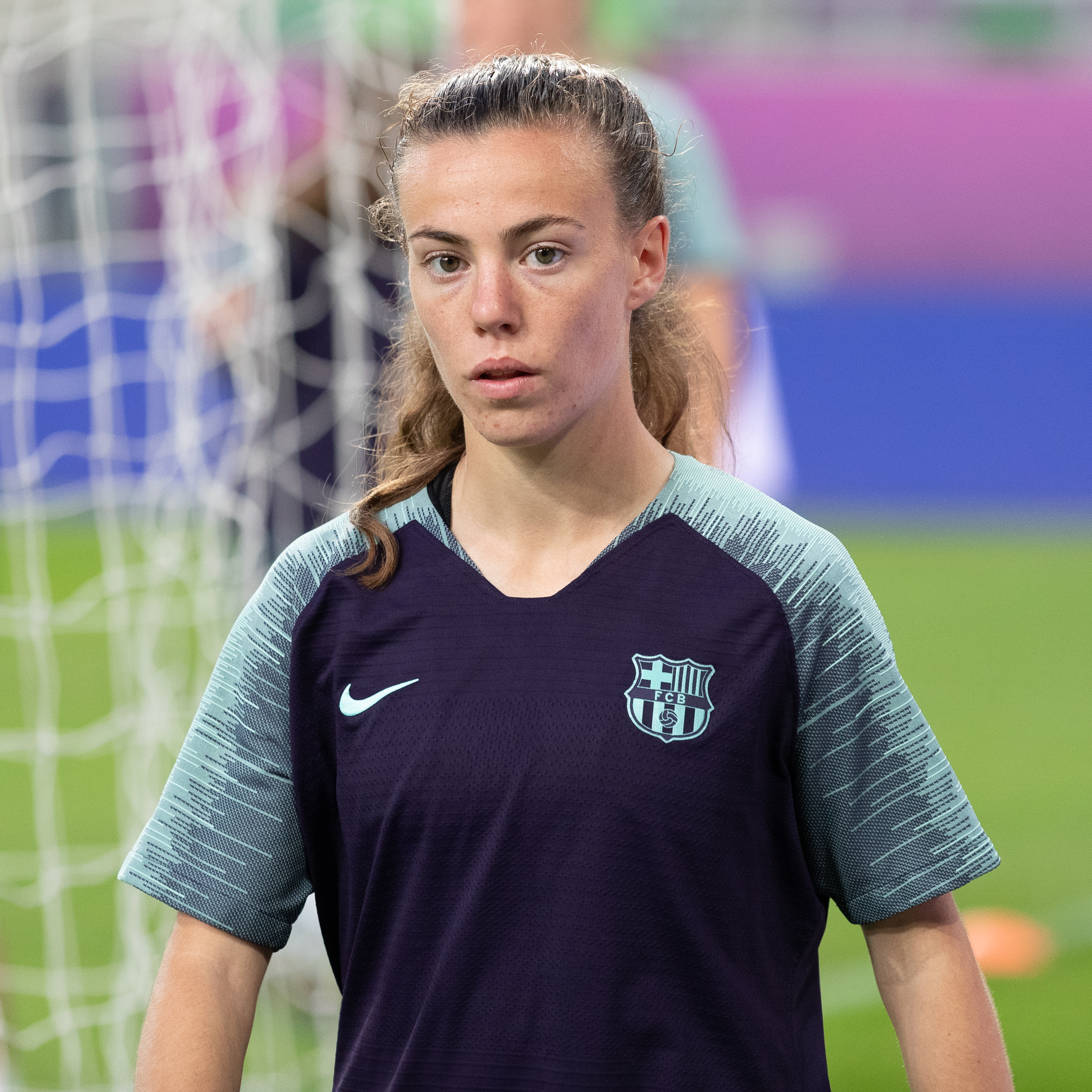
- Andújar with Barcelona in 2019

Personal information
- Full name: Candela Andújar Jiménez
- Date of birth: 26 March 2000 (age 26)
- Place of birth: Barberà del Vallès, Spain
- Height: 1.60 m (5 ft 3 in)
- Positions: Winger; forward

Youth career
- 2007–2011: Barberà Andalucía
- 2011–2012: Sant Gabriel
- 2012–2016: Barcelona

Senior career*
Years	Team	Apps	(Gls)
2016–2019	Barcelona B		
2017–2022	Barcelona	34	(2)
2020–2022	→ Valencia (loan)	36	(9)
2023–2024	Sporting San José	14	(8)

International career^{‡}
2015–2017	Spain U17	16	(2)
2017	Spain U19	11	(1)
2018	Spain U20	6	(1)
2021–2022	Spain U23	4	(2)
2021	Spain	1	(0)
- * Club domestic league appearances and goals as of 12:32, 16 November 2023 (UTC) ‡ National team caps and goals as of 04:32, 22 December 2023 (UTC)

Candela Andújar Jiménez (Spanish pronunciation: [kanˈdela anˈduxaɾ]; born 26 March 2000) is a Spanish former professional footballer who played as a forward. She represented Spain at several youth and senior levels.

== Club career ==
=== Barcelona ===
Born in Barberà del Vallès, Barcelona, Andújar began her career at the age of 7 as a goalkeeper in Barberá Andalucia, playing with boys. After 4 years she joined Sant Gabriel and spent a season there, this time in the midfielder position and only alongside young girls. She started her career at Barcelona at the start of 2012–13 season, after she was discovered by the club's scouts for her performances in Catalonia's u-12 national team. In Barça she was employed more as a winger and a forward player. She played her first official match for the senior team on 6 December 2017 against Sevilla at the age of 17, after her consistent form in Barça B, where she had scored 11 goals in 12 matches, throughout the mid season.

In June 2020, Andújar signed a contract extension to continue with Barcelona until 2022.

==== Loan to Valencia ====
On 29 July 2021, Andújar joined Valencia on a one-year loan deal.

On 18 June 2022, she announced her retirement from football at the age of 22 via an Instagram post.

== International career ==
Andújar was first invited to play for national u-16 team in February 2015, in a development tournament. She was a member of Spanish u-17 squads that achieved runner-up places of UEFA Women's Under-17 Championship in 2016 and 2017. Each time she earned a place on the team of the tournament.

Andújar was also one of the key players of u-17 national team in the 2016 U-17 Women's World Cup. At the end of the tournament she was one of the 10 candidates for the Golden Ball, which she lost to Fuka Nagano.

== Honours ==
Barcelona B

- Segunda División, Group III: 2016–17

FC Barcelona

- Primera División: 2019–20
- UEFA Women's Champions League: Runner-up 2018–19
- Supercopa Femenina: 2020

International

- FIFA U-17 Women's World Cup: Third place: 2016
- UEFA Women's Under-17 Championship: Runner-Up: 2016, 2017
