= Emma Ramírez =

Spanish footballer (born 2002)

Personal information
- Full name: Emma Ramírez Gorgoso
- Date of birth: 10 May 2002 (age 24)
- Place of birth: Cornellà de Llobregat, Spain
- Height: 1.67 m (5 ft 6 in)
- Position: Defender

Team information
- Current team: Real Sociedad
- Number: 21

Senior career*
Years	Team	Apps	(Gls)
2017–2019	Espanyol	1	(0)
2019–2021	Barcelona B	58	(3)
2020–2023	Barcelona	10	(0)
2021–2022	→ Real Sociedad (loan)	26	(4)
2023–2026	Real Sociedad	94	(7)

International career^{‡}
2021–2022	Spain U23	2	(0)
2024–	Catalonia	1	(0)
- * Club domestic league appearances and goals as of 01:47, 23 December 2025 (UTC) ‡ National team caps and goals as of 01:47, 23 December 2025 (UTC)

Emma Ramírez Gorgoso (born 10 May 2002) is a Spanish professional footballer who plays as a defender for the Catalonia women's national football team.

== Club career ==
Ramírez played youth football until age 12 in Fontsanta-Fatjóstarted. She started her senior career at Espanyol. In the 2019–20 season she signed for FC Barcelona and was assigned to their B-team. In early 2021 she made four appearances for the Blaugrana first team, including two starts.

For the 2021–22 season she was loaned to Real Sociedad, where she played regularly, leading to her agreeing a contract extension with until 2024 upon her return to Barcelona. On 30 June 2023, having only made six Liga F appearances in the preceding season, her contract with Barcelona was terminated by mutual agreement; she then signed permanently for Real Sociedad.
