= 2023–24 Primera Federación (women) =

Primera Federación
- Season: 2023–24
- Teams: 14 teams
- Champions: Barcelona B
- Promoted: Deportivo Abanca; Espanyol
- Relegated: Europa; Athletic Club B Madrid CFF B

The 2023–24 Primera Federación FutFem was the 23rd season of the second highest league tier of women's football in Spain, and the second under that name and using a single group format.

== Summary ==
14 teams took part in the league: 10 from the previous season, 2 relegated from the previous Liga F campaign, and 3 promoted from the Segunda Federación. The winner (or the highest eligible club in the event of a reserve team winning) was to be promoted automatically to Liga F, with the next four eligible clubs entering a post-season play-off phase for a second spot. Three teams were to be relegated to the Segunda Federación leagues.

Rayo Vallecano and Granadilla Tenerife B, the clubs in the upper relegation places in 2022–23, indicated they would seek to have the division's reduction from 16 to 14 teams cancelled as it was not properly announced by the RFEF, negating their demotion. Their appeal to the federation was still awaiting a decision in September 2023 with the new season fast approaching – the clubs publicly expressed their suspicion that their issue had been neglected while the RFEF focused on the Rubiales affair. The fixtures began as scheduled on 9 September without involvement of the appellants, who played their opening matches in the Segunda Federación a day later.

Barcelona B won the division for the second season in succession, but were ineligible for promotion. Instead the automatic place went to runners-up Deportivo Abanca; the 3rd to 6th placed teams taking part in the playoffs, won by Espanyol. Two of the newcomers – Europa and Madrid CFF B – were relegated, along with Athletic Club B, whose 21-year stay in the second tier (under various formats) came to an end.

== Teams ==
Continuing

- Fundación Albacete
- Athletic Club B
- Barcelona B
- Cacereño
- Deportivo Abanca
- Espanyol
- AEM
- DUX Logroño
- Osasuna

Relegated from Liga F

- Alhama
- Alavés Gloriosas

Promoted from Segunda Federación

- Atlético Madrid B
- Europa
- Madrid CFF B (the Madrid teams were the winners of its North and South sections respectively, despite both being based in the same city; Europa won a play-off between the sectional runners-up).

== Table ==
Promoted	Promotion play-offs	Relegated

	Team	P	W	D	L	GF	GA	GD	Pts
1	Barcelona B (Note: Reserve team, ineligible for promotion)	26	18	4	4	55	17	38	59
2	Deportivo Abanca	26	16	8	2	43	23	20	56
3	Espanyol	26	14	6	6	41	23	18	48
4	Osasuna	26	12	8	6	40	28	12	44
5	Alhama	26	12	7	7	34	27	7	43
6	AEM	26	11	9	6	22	15	7	42
7	DUX Logroño	26	11	3	12	31	30	1	36
8	Fundación Albacete	26	8	9	9	32	35	-3	33
9	Alavés	26	8	9	9	29	27	2	32
10	Atlético Madrid B	26	8	7	11	32	32	0	31
11	Cacereño	26	8	5	13	28	41	-13	29
12	Europa	26	6	4	16	24	54	-30	21
13	Athletic Club B	26	3	8	15	18	38	-20	17
14	Madrid CFF B	26	3	3	20	16	55	-39	12

Source: RFEF

== Results grid ==
Home \ Away	ALA	ALB	ALH	ATH	ATM	BAR	CAC	DEP	ESP	EUR	AEM	LOG	MAD	OSA
Alavés	—	1–1	1–2	1–0	4–1	0–1	2–3	0–2	0–0	4–0	1–1	4–2	1–0	0–0
Fundación Albacete	1–2	—	2–1	2–1	1–0	0–2	4–3	2–2	1–2	2–1	0–0	2–1	3–1	1–5
Alhama	2–1	2–2	—	1–0	2–2	2–1	3–2	1–1	0–1	5–0	1–0	2–1	3–2	0–1
Athletic Club B	0–0	0–0	0–0	—	1–1	0–3	0–1	0–1	0–3	1–1	0–1	0–2	1–1	2–2
Atlético Madrid B	2–0	1–1	0–0	3–2	—	1–2		1–1	0–1	5–1	0–1	0–1	1–0	2–4
Barcelona B	2–0	2–1	4–0	4–0	1–1	—	4–1	6–2	5–0	2–0	3–0	4–0	1–0	0–1
Cacereño	2–0	2–0	0–0	1–0	0–2	0–0	—	0–2	0–1	2–3	1–0	1–2	0–0	2–1
Deportivo Abanca	2–1	0–0	1–0	4–2	2–1	0–0	3–1	—	2–1	1–1	3–0	2–0	1–0	2–2
Espanyol	1–1	2–0	0–0	3–0	0–2	5–1	4–0	1–0	—	2–1	0–2	1–2	5–0	1–1
Europa	0–3	0–0	1–2	0–1	2–1	2–1	1–2	1–2	0–1	—	0–2	1–7	4–1	0–3
AEM	0–0	1–0	2–0	1–0	0–0	1–1	1–1	0–0	1–1	2–1	—	1–0	2–0	0–1
DUX Logroño	0–0	2–0	0–1	0–2	1–2	0–2	1–0	1–2	1–3	1–0	0–0	—	1–0	0–0
Madrid CFF B	1–2	0–4	0–3	1–3	2–1	0–2	3–1	0–3	1–1	0–2	0–3	0–2	—	2–1
Osasuna	1–0	1–1	2–1	2–2	2–0	0–2	2–2	1–2	2–1	0–1	1–0	0–2	4–1	—

Source: RFEF
Legend: Blue = home team win; Yellow = draw; Red = away team win.

== Promotion play-offs ==
- Semi-finals

5 May 2024	AEM	0–2	Espanyol

8 May 2024	Espanyol	2–1	AEM

- Espanyol win 4–1 on aggregate.

5 May 2024	Alhama	0–3	Osasuna

8 May 2024	Osasuna	0–1	Alhama

- Osasuna win 3–1 on aggregate.
- Final

12 May 2024	Osasuna	1–0	Espanyol
		Report

16 May 2024	Espanyol	3–1	Osasuna
		Report

- Espanyol win 3–2 on aggregate.
