= FC Barcelona B (women) =

FC Barcelona's women's reserve football team

Barcelona Femení "B"
- Full name: Futbol Club Barcelona Femení "B"
- Nicknames: Blaugranes, Culers
- Founded: 1 June 2004
- Ground: Ciutat Esportiva Joan Gamper
- Capacity: 1,400
- President: Joan Laporta
- Head coach: Óscar Belis
- League: Primera Federación
- 2025–26: 1st
- Website: http://www.fcbarcelona.com
Home colours	Away colours	Third colours

Futbol Club Barcelona Femení B is a Spanish football team based in Barcelona, in the autonomous community of Catalonia.

Founded in 2000, it is the reserve team of FC Barcelona Femení, and currently plays in Primera Federación, playing their home matches at the Ciutat Esportiva Joan Gamper.

Reserve teams in Spain play in the same league system as the senior team, rather than in a reserve team league. They must play at least one level below their main side, and thus Barcelona Femení B are ineligible for promotion to Primera División and cannot play in the Copa de la Reina.

== History ==
The first Barcelona women's second team existed by 1978, as Peña Femenina Barcelona Atlético. In the 1978–79 Catalan Cup competition, P.F. Barcelona Atlético finished as runners-up after losing the final on penalties. Their coach was Ramón Llach. Both of the Barcelona teams in 1979 were able to train and play at FC Barcelona's facilities, due to support under new club president Josep Lluís Núñez.

A "B" team was created in November 1988, after the 1988–89 season's Catalan Cup but before the start of the leagues. The club Gracia Cal Majó merged with Club Femení Barcelona to become the subsidiary team, then known as Barcelona Atlètic. This team competed in the Lliga catalana that season (with Barcelona in the Liga Nacional), but had also advanced to the next round of the Catalan Cup along with Barcelona. They competed again the following season.

Barcelona Femeni B had to withdraw from Primera Nacional Femenina during 2007–2008 season because of the relegation of the first team, but they returned in the next season after Barcelona Femení was promoted back to the Superliga Femenina. In 2016 they became the champions in the group III of Segunda División for the first time in the history of the club. In September 2016 a record seven players from Barcelona B were called up to play for Spain's national youth team for the 2016 FIFA U-17 Women's World Cup.

On 30 April 2023, they won the second division on the same day as the first team won the first division. On 27 April 2024, the team won the second division title for the second consecutive season after they defeated Athletic Bilbao B 2–0 in the final day of the season.

== Players ==
=== Current squad ===
As of 5 September 2026

Note: Flags indicate national team as defined under FIFA eligibility rules; some limited exceptions apply. Players may hold more than one non-FIFA nationality.

No.	Pos.	Nation	Player
2	DF	ESP	Martina González
5	DF	ESP	Maria Llorella
7	MF	ESP	Caroline Ferrera
12	DF	ESP	Daniela Martínez
13	GK	ESP	Rocío Romano
16	MF	ESP	Lorena Cubo
17	DF	ESP	Noa Jiménez
18	FW	ESP	Lúa Arufe
19	FW	ESP	Anna Quer
21	FW	MAR	Kautar Azraf
22	MF	ESP	Rosalía Domínguez
23	DF	ESP	Carla Julià

No.	Pos.	Nation	Player
—	GK	CAN	Khadijah Cissé
—	DF	ESP	Charlotta Ohlander
—	DF	ESP	Julia Torres
—	DF	ESP	Avril Serrano
—	MF	POL	Emilia Szymczak
—	MF	DEN	Josephine Lamp
—	MF	ESP	Laia Cabetas
—	MF	ESP	Beatriz Pérez
—	FW	NED	Liv Pennock
—	FW	DEN	Nikoline Nielsen
—	FW	ITA	Giulia Galli
—	FW	MAR	Mayssa Baha

=== Reserve team ===
Note: Flags indicate national team as defined under FIFA eligibility rules; some limited exceptions apply. Players may hold more than one non-FIFA nationality.

No.	Pos.	Nation	Player
2	DF	ESP	Carlota Martins
5	DF	ESP	Cristina López
6	MF	ESP	Mariona Señé
7	FW	ESP	Laia Guerrero
8	DF	ESP	Arlet Aguayo
9	MF	ESP	Martina Romero

No.	Pos.	Nation	Player
16	MF	ESP	Daniela López
17	FW	ESP	Nayara Núñez
26	DF	ESP	Júlia Pastor
30	MF	ESP	Bea Pérez
31	GK	ESP	Clara Raspall
33	FK	ESP	Ariana Ayats

=== Out on loan ===
Note: Flags indicate national team as defined under FIFA eligibility rules; some limited exceptions apply. Players may hold more than one non-FIFA nationality.

No.	Pos.	Nation	Player
—	DF	POR	Iara Lobo (at Parma)

=== Current technical staff ===
Position	Staff
Head coach	Óscar Belis
Assistant coach	Pol Grau
Goalkeeping coach	Albert Castillo
Fitness coach	Irene del Río
Physiotherapist	Eugenia De Muga

Last updated: 27 March 2022
Source: FC Barcelona

=== Transfers ===
Year	In	Out
2014	GK: M. Alemany (UE L'Estartit); DF: A. Rovirola (promoted from the youth team), A. Cortés (promoted from the youth team), O. Batlle (promoted from the youth team); MF: J. Mas (promoted from the youth team), A. Bonmatí (promoted from the youth team), S. Hernández (Sant Gabriel), C. Armengol (promoted from the youth team); FW: A. Arboix (L'Estartit), I. Uribe (Sant Gabriel C)	GK: N. Vizcaíno (Sant Gabriel B), A. Moreno (Santa Teresa); DF: C. Moyano (Espanyol B), M. Gama (retired), X. Royo (Seagull); MF: Q. Torradeflot (UE Vic), M. Turmo (Sant Gabriel), C. García (Sant Gabriel), J. Fernández (Bristol Academy); FW: J. Rivero (UE Vic), G. Sala (Levante Las Planas)
2015	GK: K.A. Schmidt (Saint Mary's Gaels), I. Martínez (Sant Gabriel B), G. Font (promoted from the youth team); DF: B. Pujadas (promoted from the youth team), H. Barco (Espanyol Juvenil A), L. Aleixandri (promoted from the youth team); MF: L. Martínez (promoted from the youth team), P. Fernández (promoted from the youth team); FW: E. Benítez (promoted from the youth team), L. Muñoz (promoted from the youth team)	GK: M. Alemany (Monroe Mustangs); DF: A. Cortés (retired), Q. Gómez (Igualada); MF: J. Mas (Espanyol B); FW: A. Arboix (Girona), A. Aparicio (Little Rock Trojans), C. Puiggrós (L'Estartit)
2016	GK: A. Giménez (Espanyol); DF: A. Torrodà (promoted from the youth team), B. Bou (L'Estartit); MF: T. Morató (ENFAF), S. Ismael (Espanyol B), S. Hernández (L'Estartit); FW: M. Benedicto (promoted from the youth team), C. Andújar (promoted from the youth team), A. Martínez (promoted from the youth team)	GK: K.A. Schmidt (Levante Las Planas); DF: N. Garrote (Espanyol); MF: A. Bonmatí (promoted to the first team), N. Martínez (Logroño), S. Hernández (promoted to the first team), A. Falcón (Atlético M.), P. Garrote (Espanyol), E. Benítez (Espanyol B); FW: I. Uribe (Seagull)
2017	DF: J. Viñas (Espanyol B), L. Codina (promoted from the youth team); MF: A. Esteve (Espanyol Juvenil A), P. Gutiérrez (Espanyol Juvenil A); FW: S. Extremera (Espanyol Juvenil A), C. Pina (promoted from the youth team), A. Marín (promoted from the youth team)	GK: I. Martínez (Sevilla); DF: A. Rovirola (Santa Teresa), B. Pujadas (Espanyol), O. Batlle (Madrid CFF), L. Aleixandri (Atlético M.); MF: P. Fernández (Málaga); FW: M. Benedicto (Espanyol B), A. Martínez (Espanyol B)
2018	GK: G. López (promoted from the youth team), P. Argelaguet (promoted from the youth team); DF: J. Fernández (promoted from the youth team); MF: C. Martínez (Seagull), L. Linares (promoted from the youth team), M. Vilarrasa (promoted from the youth team), Z. Flores (Seagull); FW: B. Vilamala (promoted from the youth team)	GK: A. Giménez (retired); DF: S. Extremera (Espanyol B), J. Viñas (EFM Lanzarote); MF: L. Martínez (Zaragoza CFF), S. Hernández (Fundación Albacete B), A. Torrodà (Espanyol); FW: A. Marín (Espanyol), L. Muñoz (Monroe Mustangs)
2019	GK: M. Muñoz (Mercantil, L. Coronado (promoted from the youth team); DF: A. Fernández (promoted from the youth team), J. Mora (Espanyol B), E. Ramírez (Espanyol B); MF: A. Mingueza (promoted from the youth team); FW: V. Adrianova (promoted from the youth team), A. Aparicio (Little Rock Trojans)	GK: G. López (CE Europa), P. Argelaguet (retired); MF: L. Linares (Iowa Western Reivers), M. Vilarrasa (Levante Las Planas)
2020	GK: L. García (Seagull); DF: M. Fernandez (promoted from the youth team), C. Rodriguez (promoted from the youth team), E.Laborde (promoted from the youth team), M. Molina (Espanyol B); MF: A. Caño (promoted from the youth team), M. Pérez (DAMM), M. Llopis (Espanyol B), J. Bartel (promoted from the youth team); FW: C. Riumalló (promoted from the youth team), P. Lopez (Levante Las Planas), O. Vignola (Málaga), O. Baradad (SE AEM), G. Queiroz (Madrid CFF)	GK: G. Font (promoted to the first team); DF: A. Fernández (James Madison University), H. Barco (retired), L. Codina (promoted to the first team); MF: C. Martínez (CF Pallejà), Z. Flores (Rayo Vallecano), P. Gutiérrez (Madrid CFF), A. Esteve (Eibar); FW: T. Morató (Rayo Vallecano), A. Aparicio (Eibar), C. Pina (loaned to Sevilla), C. Armengol (loaned to Sevilla), C. Andújar (loaned to Valencia)
2021	GK: M. Font (promoted from the youth team); DF: B. Doltra (Girona); FW: L. Corrales (Atlético Baleares), R. Garcia (UD Collerense)	GK: L. García (Levante Las Planas); DF: J. Fernández (promoted to the first team), E. Ramírez (loaned to Real Sociedad), J. Mora (Levante Las Planas); FW: B. Vilamala (promoted to the first team), G. Queiroz (loaned to Levante)
2022	MF: V. López (Madrid CFF); FW: A. Arias (Real Madrid)	MF: O. Vignola (loaned to Sevilla); FW: G. Queiroz (Arsenal)
2023	MF: G. Dragoni (Inter Milan)	MF: O. Vignola (loaned to Alavés; transferred to Granada), M. Pérez (promoted to the first team), A. Mingueza (Granada); FW: E. Laborde (loaned to Alavés; transferred to Madrid CFF)
2024	MF: S. Schertenleib (Grasshopper Club Zürich); FW: L. Arufe (Victoria CF)	MF: J. Bartel (Chelsea), G. Dragoni (loaned to AS Roma); FW: A. Arias (VfL Wolfsburg), L. Corrales (loaned to Sevilla)
2025	GK: R. Romano (promoted from youth team); DF: D. Martínez (promoted from youth team), N. Jiménez (promoted from youth team), C. Julià (Levante Badalona B), E. Szymczak (Loan return from Liverpool); MF: E. Gálvez (promoted from youth team), C. Ferrera (Tenerife B); FW: L. Arufe (promoted from youth team), K. Azraf (promoted from youth team)	GK: M. Muñoz (Espanyol); DF: A. Cámara (promoted to first team), E. Szymczak (loaned to Liverpool), J. Pujols (Wolfsburg), L. Martín (Villarreal); MF: E. Martín (Valencia), C. Serrajordi (promoted to first team), S. Schertenleib (promoted to first team), W. Araśniewicz (loaned to Wolfsburg), O. Gamero (Bay FC); FW: O. Baradad (Espanyol), L. Corrales (London City Lionesses), Noa Ortega (Atlético Madrid)
2026	GK: K. Cissé (Kentucky Wildcats); DF: J. Torres (Sevilla); MF: J. Lamp (Nordsjælland); FW: L. Pennock (Twente), N. Nielsen (Fortuna Hjørring), G. Galli (Roma)	GK: DF: MF: FW:

== Season to season ==
Season	Division	Tier	Pos	Pld	W	D	L	GF	GA	GD	Pts	Manager
2003-04	1ª Catalonia	3	1.º	-	-	-	-	-	-	-	-	Ramon Torne
2004-05	2ª Grupo III	2	7.º	26	10	4	12	48	48	0	34	Ramon Torne
2005-06	2ª Grupo III	2	8.º	26	9	5	12	62	41	19	32	Ramon Torne
2006-07	2ª Grupo III	2	6.º (Note: Despite earning enough points to remain in the league, they had to drop to regional league due to the relegation of the first team)	26	11	5	10	42	44	-2	38	Joaquim Querol
2007-08	1ª Catalonia	3	1.º	26	24	6	0	101	20	+81	78	Joaquim Querol
2008-09	2ª Grupo III	2	10.º	26	9	6	11	53	41	+12	33	Joaquim Querol
2009-10	2ª Grupo III	2	3.º	26	19	1	6	95	32	+63	58	Joaquim Querol
2010-11	2ª Grupo III	2	5.º	26	11	8	7	56	39	+17	41	Joaquim Querol
2011-12	2ª Grupo III	2	4.º	26	15	4	7	51	32	+19	49	Joaquim Querol
2012-13	2ª Grupo III	2	5.º	26	13	7	6	59	49	+10	46	Joaquim Querol
2013-14	2ª Grupo III	2	7.º	26	10	5	11	39	31	+8	35	Jordi Ventura
2014-15	2ª Grupo III	2	2.º	26	19	6	1	77	12	+65	63	Jordi Ventura
2015-16	2ª Grupo III	2	1.º	26	23	3	0	104	11	+93	72	Zoe García
2016-17	2ª Grupo III	2	1.º	26	19	3	4	79	23	+56	60	Zoe García
2017-18	2ª Grupo III	2	1.º (Note: The team was not qualified to participate in promotion play-offs despite winning the league three years in a row, because as a reserve team it needs to remain at least one tier below the first team)	26	20	3	3	81	17	+64	63	Jordi Ventura
2018-19	2ª Grupo III	2	3.º (Note: Promoted to the new Spanish second division Segunda División Pro (women))	26	16	5	5	72	26	+46	53	Jordi Ventura
2019-20	2ªPro Group North	2	3.º	22	14	3	5	61	28	+33	45	Jordi Ventura
2020-21	2ªPro Group North "B"	2	3.º	16	7	5	4	30	19	+11	26	Miguel Llorente
2020-21	2ªPro Group North "C"	2	4.º	24	12	5	7	47	26	+21	41	Miguel Llorente
2021-22	2ªPro Group North	2	6°	27	15	3	9	46	27	+19	48	Óscar Belis
2022-23	1ª RFEF	2	1° (Note: The team was not promoted despite winning the league, because it needs to remain at least one tier below the first team)	30	18	5	7	58	31	+27	59	Óscar Belis
2023-24	1ª RFEF	2	1°	26	18	4	4	55	17	+38	58	Óscar Belis
2024-25	1ª RFEF	2	8°	26	10	8	8	42	35	+7	38	Óscar Belis
2025-26	1ª RFEF	2	1°	26	18	4	4	67	26	+41	58	Óscar Belis
Last update on 2 May 2026

== See also ==
- Category:FC Barcelona Femení B players
