= 2022–23 FC Barcelona Femení season =

Barcelona Femení
2022–23 season
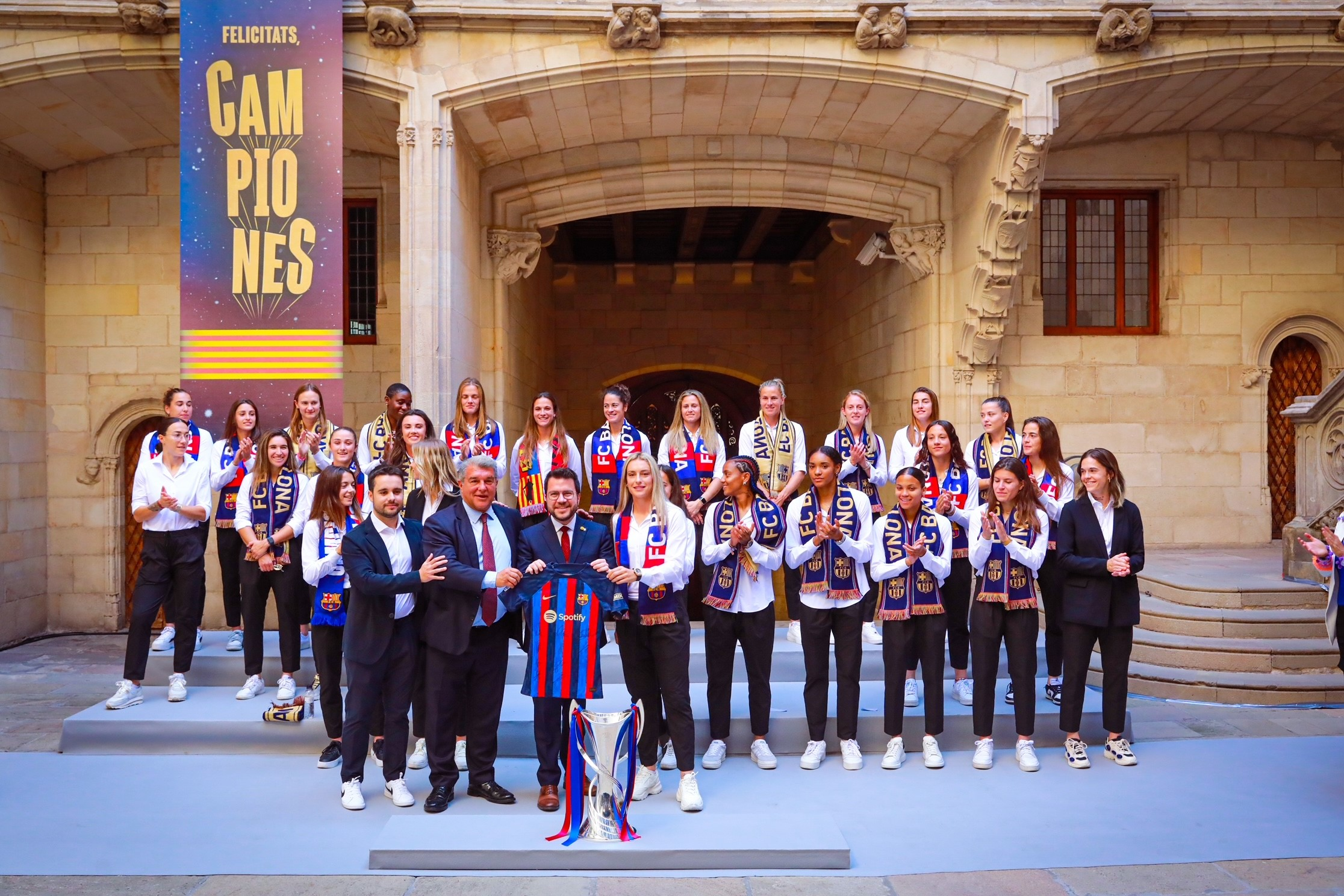
- The team being received by the Generalitat de Catalunya after winning the Champions League in June 2023
- President: Joan Laporta
- Head coach: Jonatan Giráldez
- Stadium: Johan Cruyff Stadium; Camp Nou (select matches)
- Liga F: Winners
- Copa de la Reina: Round of 16 *
- Supercopa de España: Winners
- UEFA Champions League: Winners
- Top goalscorer: League: Asisat Oshoala (21 goals); All: Asisat Oshoala (27 goals)
- Highest home attendance: 72,262 vs Chelsea (27 April 2023)
- Lowest home attendance: 2,758 vs Alhama (10 December 2022)
- Average home league attendance: 4,618
- Biggest win: Home: Barcelona 9–0 Benfica; Away: Osasuna 0–9 Barcelona
- Biggest defeat: Bayern 3–1 Barcelona
Home colours	Away colours	Third colours

The 2022–23 season was the 35th season in the history of FC Barcelona Femení. In addition to the domestic league, Barcelona also played in the season's editions of the Copa de la Reina, Supercopa de España Femenina and UEFA Women's Champions League. They ended the season with a continental treble (winning the league, the Supercopa and the Champions League), scoring 173 goals in all competitions and conceding 21 goals; they won 91% of all their matches in all competitions.

On transfer deadline day, 7 September, Barcelona broke the world record for a transfer fee in women's football when they signed English midfielder Keira Walsh from Manchester City for €470,000 in a three-year deal.

In their first match of the UEFA Women's Champions League group stage, Barcelona surpassed their previous goal-scoring record of six goals in one game in the competition after winning 9–0 against Benfica. In their last match of the Champions League group stage, a 6–0 win against Rosengård, Barcelona surpassed the record for most goals scored by a women's team in the group stages, scoring 29 goals in total and beating the previous record of 25 goals, set by PSG during the previous season.

On 22 January 2023, the team won the 2022–23 Supercopa de España Femenina. Two days later, they were technically disqualified from the 2022–23 Copa de la Reina de Fútbol. On 30 April 2023, Barcelona won the league for the fourth consecutive season and eighth time overall. This was the second season in a row in which they have won the league with a perfect season (all wins); after winning the title they suffered a loss and a draw.

On 3 June, Barcelona won the UEFA Women's Champions League for the second time in the team's history, mounting a comeback to win 3–2 against VfL Wolfsburg in the final.

== Kits ==
- Supplier: Nike
- Sponsor: Spotify (front) / UNHCR – The UN Refugee Agency (back)

Home	Home alt.	Away	Third	Fourth	Goalkeeper 1	Goalkeeper 2	Goalkeeper 3

== Season overview ==
=== June 2022 ===
On 1 June, Barcelona announced that defender Leila Ouahabi would be leaving the club after thirteen years and 199 appearances; with the club she had scored seven goals and won every trophy possible, including five leagues titles and one Champions League. Speaking to Barça TV, Ouahabi said: "After 13 years at the club, I think my time has come. It's the end of one era and the start of another. I'm so proud of everything that I've achieved and want to thank the fans for all their support. I am leaving safe in the knowledge that I achieved everything that I set out to do."

On 3 June, Barcelona announced the contract renewal of head coach Jonatan Giráldez until 30 June 2024. On 4 June, Barcelona renewed the contract of defender Laia Codina until 2024. On 6 June and 7 June, Barcelona announced the renewals of goalkeeper Gemma Font and Swiss player Ana-Maria Crnogorčević respectively, both renewed until 2024.

On 17 June, Barcelona announced the first signing of the season, defender Nuria Rábano, who signed until 2024. On 18 June, the signing of English defender Lucy Bronze was announced, also until 2024. On 19 June, Barcelona announced the signing of Brazilian striker Geyse Ferreira until 2024. She was joint league top scorer in the previous season alongside Asisat Oshoala, with twenty goals.

On 22 June, striker Jenni Hermoso announced on Instagram that she was leaving the club. In six and a half seasons as a blaugrana, Hermoso became the club's all-time leading goalscorer with 181 goals in 224 official appearances. Her record allowed her to be the league's top scorer with Barça in 2016, 2017, 2020 and 2021. Hermoso was also top scorer in the 2020–21 Champions League. In her Instagram post, Hermoso said: "Everything comes and sometimes ends. I am very proud of having given my all in the shirt."

On 30 June, Barcelona announced that Dutch winger Lieke Martens was also departing the club after her contract ended. Her 158 appearances in the Barça shirt are a record for a non-Spanish player.

The record holder for most appearances for the club, defender Melanie Serrano, announced her retirement after eighteen years and 517 appearances, also announcing that she will stay on at the club working in a non-playing capacity. Forward Candela Andújar also announced her retirement in an Instagram post.

=== July ===
On 5 July, Barcelona announced that captain Alexia Putellas had suffered an anterior cruciate ligament injury in her left knee while training with the Spanish national team in England at the Euro 2022 tournament. On 11 July, it was announced that Alexia would undergo an operation the next day. Also on 11 July, Barcelona announced the signing of striker Salma Paralluelo, who signed until 2026. On 12 July, Alexia had her operation. A success, the nature of the injury and the recovery meant she was still set miss the majority of the season due to recovery; it was estimated that the earliest she could return to play would be April 2023.

On 22 July, Barcelona's Nigerian striker Asisat Oshoala won the African Women's Footballer of the Year award for a record 5th time.

On 26 July, the contract renewal of defender Emma Ramírez until 2024 was announced. Barcelona also announced the signing of 16-year-old midfielder Vicky López, who signed until 2027.

On 31 July, Barcelona defender Lucy Bronze won the Euro 2022 tournament with England and striker Geyse Ferreira won the Copa América with Brazil.

=== August ===
On 6 August, Barcelona opened the pre-season with a 10–0 demolition of AEM Lleida in a friendly, which included a hat-trick by Caroline Graham Hansen.

On 9 August, Barcelona reached an agreement with defender Andrea Pereira to terminate her contract after playing four seasons with the club.

The team then travelled to France to take part in the AMOS Women's French Cup. On 16 August the team faced Bayern Munich in the semi-final of the tournament, where they were narrowly beaten 1–2. Then on 19 August, Barcelona won 5–4 on penalties against Paris Saint-Germain in the third place play-off match to finish third in the summer friendly tournament.

On 18 August, Barcelona announced that they have reached an agreement with plant-based food company Heura Foods. They will be the new partner of the first Barça women's team for the next three seasons; until the 30th of June 2025.

On 23 August, Barcelona retained the Joan Gamper Trophy after beating Montpellier 6–0 at Estadi Johan Cruyff; midfielder Patri Guijarro was named MVP of the match.

On 25 August, captain Alexia Putellas won the UEFA Women's Player of the Year Award for the second year in a row.

On 27 August, Barcelona reached an agreement with midfielder Andrea Falcón to terminate her contract after playing 41 matches for the club.

On 27 August, Barcelona concluded the pre-season with a 2–4 win on penalties against Granadilla Tenerife to win the invitational Teide Trophy for the first time.

On 30 August, Barcelona announced that they reached an agreement with the packaging company GLS Group, which became the official logistic partner of the squad and will remain a global sponsor of the club for the next three seasons, until 30 June 2025.

=== September ===
On transfer deadline day, 7 September, Barcelona broke the world record for a transfer fee in women's football when they signed English midfielder Keira Walsh from Manchester City for €470,000 in a three-year deal, until 30 June 2025.

On 9 September, Barcelona reached an agreement with Arsenal for the transfer of Brazilian striker Gio Queiroz to the English club.

On 11 September, Barcelona were supposed to play the first league match of the season against Levante Las Planas. Both teams arrived in Sant Joan Despí at the allotted time and, after warming up, they lined up for the game as normal. As no match officials arrived, they waited for the required half hour before the game was officially called off; like others, the match was postponed after the referee and match officials did not show up to the venue as part of a strike asking for higher wages from the Royal Spanish Football Federation. On 15 September 2022, a deal was reached between the parties to end the strike, which paved the way for the league season to start. A new date for the postponed match was decided by the federation; Barcelona played the postponed first round match on 3 November 2022.

On 17 September, Barcelona started off the new season with a 2–0 win against Granadilla Tenerife, with goals from Caroline Graham Hansen and the new signing Geyse Ferreira. By coming off the bench to play in this match, Vicky López became the youngest person to play for Barcelona Femení's first team in the professional era, at 16 years, 1 month and 19 days.

On 25 September, Barcelona won 1–4 against Villarreal to claim the first position in the league table for the first time this season. Goals were scored by Mapi León, Asisat Oshoala, and Clàudia Pina, and an own goal was scored by Villarreal defender Lara Mata.

=== October ===
On 1 October, Barcelona crushed Madrid CFF 7–0 to claim their third victory in a row and to maintain the first position in the league table. Caroline Graham Hansen scored once while Mariona Caldentey, Geyse Ferreira and Ana-Maria Crnogorčević scored two goals each.

On 3 October, the draw for the 2022–23 UEFA Women's Champions League group stage was held in Nyon. Barcelona was drawn into Group D to play against Bayern Munich, Benfica, and Rosengård.

On 4 October, Barcelona announced that the home matches against Bayern Munich and Rosengård will be played at Camp Nou, while the home match against Benfica will be played at Estadi Johan Cruyff.

On 15 October, following the international break, Barcelona continued their dominance, taking their fourth straight win in the league by beating Athletic Club 0–3 with goals from Clàudia Pina, Geyse Ferreira and Mariona Caldentey.

On 17 October, captain Alexia Putellas won her second consecutive Ballon d'Or Féminin at the 2022 ceremony, and became the first-ever two-time winner of the honour, and the first to have won it in consecutive years. Aitana Bonmatí, Asisat Oshoala and Fridolina Rolfö and were also shortlisted for the award and were ranked 5th, 16th and 19th respectively.

On 19 October, in their first match of the UEFA Women's Champions League group stage, Barcelona surpassed their previous goal-scoring record of six goals in one game in the competition after winning 9–0 against Benfica; the new goal-scoring record for the team was achieved with goals from Patricia Guijarro, Aitana Bonmatí, Mariona Caldentey, Ana-Maria Crnogorčević, Clàudia Pina, who scored one goal each and Asisat Oshoala and Geyse Ferreira, who scored two goals each. The first goal of Asisat Oshoala scored in the 34th minute was chosen as the Goal of the Week for matchday 1 of the Champions League group stage. On the same day, Barcelona reached an agreement with the Mexican multinational food company Grupo Bimbo to become the club's Global Partner and the main partner for the women's football first team. The core strategies for this alliance involve promoting healthy and active lifestyles, fostering new talents, and a clear investment in women's empowerment. The women's team aim to become financially independent from the men's team with partnerships like the one with Bimbo.

On 20 October, Barcelona announced that defender Laia Codina had suffered an acromioclavicular joint dislocation – a separated shoulder – in her right shoulder, which occurred while playing in the match against Benfica the day before. It was announced that she would miss six weeks as a result of the injury and would return to play in early December.

On 21 October, captain Alexia Putellas won the Golden Player Woman award presented by the Italian sport magazine Tuttosport. She became the second winner of the award; Lieke Martens won it in 2021 while playing for Barcelona.

On 22 October, Barcelona won their sixth consecutive match of the season after defeating Real Betis with a 0–3 result. Goals were scored by Fridolina Rolfö and Caroline Graham Hansen, and an own goal was scored by Real Betis' forward Rinsola Babajide.

On 24 October, the second Gala de Fútbol Femenino was held by Mundo Deportivo, with several members of the team winning awards, and the team itself receiving special recognition for achieving a new record attendance for a women's football match in the previous season.

On 27 October, Barcelona won their second consecutive group stage match of the season against Rosengård and claimed their seventh win in a row in all competitions with a 1–4 result. Aitana Bonmatí and Mariona Caldentey both contributed to the win with two goals each. The first goal of Mariona Caldentey scored in the 65th minute where she scored from the halfway line was chosen as the Goal of the Week for matchday 2 of the Champions League group stage. During the match Norwegian striker Caroline Graham Hansen suffered an injury, the tests carried out the next day revealed that she had suffered an injury to the biceps femoris tendon in her right thigh, otherwise known as a pulled hamstring.

On 30 October, Barcelona narrowly beat Levante 2–1 to get their sixth straight win in the league. Aitana Bonmatí and Ingrid Engen both scored to get the hard-fought win for the team. This win also marked the 41st consecutive league win for the team and the 56th win out of 56 matches played in all competitions at the Johan Cruyff stadium since its inauguration in 2019. In that time, the team has scored 293 goals and conceded just 22 goals. In addition, against Levante, Barça won their 50th consecutive match at home in the league. The last match they did not win outright was on 13 February 2019; since then, the team has scored 271 goals and conceded just 21 goals.

On the same day, recently promoted Barcelona B player Vicky López was awarded the Golden Ball, the award for the best player of the tournament, at the 2022 FIFA U-17 Women's World Cup after Spain defeated Colombia 0–1 in the final to win their second title. She inspired Spain to a comeback against Japan in the quarter-finals after scoring two goals in six minutes at the end (87', 90+3') to win the match 1–2. She became the second Barcelona player to win the award after Clàudia Pina did the same at the 2018 FIFA U-17 Women's World Cup.

By the end of the month, the team's continued success without their injured players, especially Putellas, was praised, as was the incorporation of summer signings, particularly Bronze, Walsh and Geyse.

=== November ===
On 3 November, Barcelona won their ninth consecutive match of the season after beating Levante Las Planas 0–4 with goals from Patricia Guijarro, Asisat Oshoala, Irene Paredes and Salma Paralluelo who scored her first goal for the club.

On 6 November, Barcelona defeated Real Madrid 0–4 and got their ninth competitive Women's Clásico win out of nine matches played between the teams. Goals were scored by Ana-Maria Crnogorčević, Patricia Guijarro, Aitana Bonmatí and Fridolina Rolfö. Barcelona has won all of their matches against Real Madrid, scoring 33 goals and conceding only 5 goals.

On 7 November, the second edition of the Golsmedia FutbolFest Awards Gala was held by the Royal Spanish Football Federation at their headquarters, La Ciudad del Fútbol in Madrid; Alexia Putellas won the award for the Best Player of the Liga Iberdrola for her performances throughout the 2021–22 season, Sandra Paños won the award for the Best Goalkeeper of the Liga Iberdrola for the 2021–22 season, and the team itself received the SuperCampeonas Award, as a special recognition for their unbeaten and perfect domestic season.

On 17 November, captain Alexia Putellas won the Globe Soccer Award for Best Women's Player of the Year 2022 for her performances throughout the year. This was her record second win of the award after she won the award for the first time last year. Aitana Bonmatí, Caroline Graham Hansen, and Lucy Bronze (the only female winner besides Putellas) were also nominated.

On 20 November, Barcelona took a powerful win, defeating Deportivo Alavés 8–0. Clàudia Pina scored twice, with Asisat Oshoala, Fridolina Rolfö, Mapi León, Salma Paralluelo, Ana-Maria Crnogorčević and Geyse Ferreira each contributing to the victory. It was also León's 200th official match with the club, and the first appearance for Bruna Vilamala after over a year of recuperation for an injury she suffered on 25 October 2021; León scored and Vilamala provided the assist for the last goal.

On 21 November, the 10th edition of the Gala de les Estrelles del Futbol Català (Catalan Football Stars Gala) was held by the Catalan Football Federation at the Old Factory Estrella Damm (Antigua fábrica Damm), in Barcelona, for football and futsal in Catalonia. Alexia Putellas was crowned as the Best Women's Catalan Player of the Year for a record fourth time; she received 51.2% of the jury votes and beat her teammate Aitana Bonmatí (46.3%) to the prize. Putellas was also given the award for the Top scorer of the Year for the 18 goals she scored in the domestic league last season. The Most Promising Player award was given to Clàudia Pina with 80.5% of the votes, ahead of her teammates Meritxell Font (12.2%) and Júlia Bartel (7.3%).

On 24 November, Barcelona defeated Bayern Munich 3–0 in their first match of the season to be held at the Camp Nou, and their third Women's Champions League match of the season. They maintained their perfect streak, with the goals coming from Geyse Ferreira, Aitana Bonmatí and Clàudia Pina. Pina's goal, scored in the 66th minute from outside the box, was chosen as the Goal of the Week for matchday 3 of the Champions League group stage, it was also later chosen as the Goal of the Group Stage.

Barcelona also set the record for the highest ever attendance for a Women's Champions League group stage game, and the fourth-highest of all Women's Champions League matches (the top two were also set at Camp Nou), with a record crowd of 46,967 spectators, even as the south stand was closed for renovation and a 2022 FIFA World Cup match was being played at the same time. Barcelona would not play league games in the Camp Nou over the men's World Cup break, a choice that received some criticism, as the venue is popular and the increased attendance possibilities could help grow the women's game in Spain and further raise the profile of the team.

On 27 November, Barcelona beat Atlético Madrid 1–6, with Salma Paralluelo scoring two goals off the bench and Ana-Maria Crnogorčević, Mapi León, Lucy Bronze, and Ingrid Engen also netting goals; Bronze's goal was her first for the team.

Towards the end of November, members of the team and their male counterparts starred in videos promoting the 2022 Spotify Wrapped, as part of the club's affiliation with Spotify.

=== December ===
On 3 December, the team extended their winning streak to eleven league wins in a row by beating Real Sociedad 2–1 in a difficult match. Coming from behind, Marta Torrejón scored in the 62nd minute to equalise, and Lucy Bronze scored in the 89th minute to complete the dramatic comeback and maintain their 100% win record since the start of the season.

However, on 7 December, the team suffered their first defeat of the season and their first competitive defeat since 21 May 2022 (the 1–3 loss against Olympique Lyonnais that saw them come second in the 2022 UEFA Women's Champions League final). Playing Bayern Munich at the Allianz Arena, Barcelona again lost 1–3, with their goal coming from Geyse Ferreira. This defeat ended the fourteen-match undefeated and winning streak across all competitions that the team had enjoyed since the start of the season. Despite the defeat and being equal with Bayern Munich on points, Barcelona remained first in Group D, because they had better head-to-head goal difference against Bayern and better goal difference overall.

On 10 December, Barcelona bounced back from the setback with a 4–0 win against Alhama, with Clàudia Pina, Salma Paralluelo, Bruna Vilamala and Asisat Oshoala getting on the scoresheet.

In the 2022 edition of the International Federation of Football History & Statistics Women's Awards, Alexia Putellas won the Player of the Year award for a record second time. She also won the Playmaker of the Year award for the second time, with teammates Keira Walsh and Aitana Bonmatí placing third and fourth respectively.

On 15 December, Barcelona saw themselves through to the quarter-finals of the Champions League, with a 6–2 away win against Benfica. Goals were scored by Irene Paredes, Clàudia Pina, Aitana Bonmatí, Ana-Maria Crnogorčević, and Mariona Caldentey, and an own goal was scored by Benfica defender Ana Seiça. Pina's goal, scored in the second additional minute before half-time (45+2') from just outside the edge of the box, was chosen as the Goal of the Week for matchday 5 of the Champions League group stage. Barcelona goalkeeper Sandra Paños saved two penalty kicks during the match, both near the close of the game and each by correctly diving in a different direction.

The Marca Women's Sports Awards Gala was held on 19 December 2022, at the Old Factory Estrella Damm (Antigua fábrica Damm), in Barcelona, recognizing the best football players and athletes of the previous season. Alexia Putellas was awarded the MVP award, Asisat Oshoala and Geyse Ferreira shared the Pichichi Trophy, having both scored 20 goals last season, Salma Paralluelo won the best Goal of the Year award, and manager Jonatan Giráldez won the Best Coach award.

The GOAL50 list of the best women's players of the year was published on 20 December, with Alexia Putellas coming first for the second consecutive year. Overall, ten Barcelona players placed on the list in the following order: 1. Alexia Putellas, 2. Aitana Bonmatí, 5. Fridolina Rolfö, 6. Caroline Graham Hansen, 7. Lucy Bronze, 9. Asisat Oshoala, 11. Keira Walsh, 15. Mapi León, 18. Irene Paredes, 27. Mariona Caldentey.

Having already made it out of the Champions League group stage, Barcelona faced Rosengård, who were already eliminated, at home at the Camp Nou on 21 December, for their last match of the year. Realistically only needing to win to top the group, Barcelona went up in the first ten minutes and continued to dominate, winning 6–0, including a brace from Asisat Oshoala and a free kick from the edge of the box from Mapi León, the rest of the goals came from Fridolina Rolfö, Marta Torrejón and Irene Paredes. Rolfö's goal, scored in the 47th minute, was chosen as the Goal of the Week for matchday 6 of the Champions League group stage. In this match, Barcelona broke the record for the most goals scored by a women's team in the group stages of the Champions League, scoring 29 goals and beating last years record of 25 goals set by PSG. The match was attended by 28,720 fans, making it the second highest attended match of the season, and brought the total attendance of all the matches played at Camp Nou throughout the year to 258,888 spectators. The win was also Barcelona's 50th overall win in the Champions League.

The list of The 100 Best Female Footballers in the World was fully released on 24 December, with twelve Barcelona players on the list, including five in the Top 10: 1. Alexia Putellas, 4. Aitana Bonmatí, 8. Caroline Graham Hansen, 9. Keira Walsh, 10. Lucy Bronze; 17. Mapi León, 19. Fridolina Rolfö, 30. Irene Paredes, 31. Patricia Guijarro, 38. Asisat Oshoala, 58. Mariona Caldentey, 72. Geyse Ferreira.

On 30 December, Alexia Putellas was named the Best Female Athlete of 2022 by the International Sports Press Association (AIPS), receiving 452 votes (11.96%) from the panel of 420 journalists from 113 countries who had voted. On the same day, Clàudia Pina's UWCL goal scored against Bayern Munich on matchday 3 was voted the Goal of the Group Stage by fans. Also on 30 December, the Commonwealth Honours Committee released its 2023 New Year Honours, in which Lucy Bronze (Lucia Roberta Tough Bronze) was made a Member of The Most Excellent Order of the British Empire for services to football.

=== January ===
On 7 January 2023, Barcelona got their first win of the new year, and their thirteenth consecutive win in the league, by defeating Sevilla at home 4–0. The goals were scored by Asisat Oshoala, Clàudia Pina and Salma Paralluelo, who took a brace after coming on as a substitute.

With the team having a packed schedule in January, there were ten changes to the starting line-up for the next match, a Copa de la Reina tie against second division team Osasuna on 10 January, only Keira Walsh being retained and several of the B team called up. Barcelona won 9–0 away, with Bruna Vilamala scoring the first hat-trick of the season, Aitana Bonmatí and Salma Paralluelo each netting two goals, and Geyse Ferreira and Mariona Caldentey also adding to the tally. During the match, a coach mentioned on social media that Geyse had been sent off in the Copa de la Reina at the end of the previous season, while playing for Madrid CFF, and had no prior opportunity to serve the match suspension; Osasuna announced later in the day that they would appeal the match result.

On 12 January, the shortlists for The Best FIFA Football Awards were announced: Aitana Bonmatí, Alexia Putellas, and Keira Walsh were nominated for The Best FIFA Women's Player (which Putellas won the previous year); Sandra Paños was nominated for The Best FIFA Goalkeeper; and Salma Paralluelo was nominated for the FIFA Puskás Award, though for a goal she scored against Barcelona while playing for Villarreal. Jonatan Giráldez was considered a notable omission from the coach shortlist.

On 14 January, Barcelona got a comfortable 3–0 win away against Sporting de Huelva, making it the season's fourteenth consecutive league win in as many matches. Asisat Oshoala scored twice and Mariona Caldentey scored once.

The middle of January saw contract extensions for the club's Norwegian players: forward Caroline Graham Hansen signed until 30 June 2026 on 16 January, with midfielder Ingrid Engen signing until 30 June 2025 the next day.

On 19 January, Deloitte published their Deloitte Football Money League, including women's teams for the first time. Barcelona femení ranked as number one in women's football, having generated €7.7 million in the previous season, largely from marketing and advertising. Deloitte also noted the growing importance of transfer fees in the revenue of women's teams. Barcelona started their Supercopa defense against Real Madrid on 19 January 2023, in the second Women's Clásico of the season, which they won 3–1 after extra-time, advancing to the final thanks to goals from Clàudia Pina, Mariona Caldentey and Salma Paralluelo. In the final on 22 January 2023, they faced Real Sociedad. Barcelona won 3–0, with two goals from Aitana Bonmatí and another in added time from Asisat Oshoala. With the victory, Barcelona became the only club to win the Supercopa three times; the match also saw them achieve their 100th goal of the season across all competitions.

During the winners' ceremony after the match, spectators noted that both teams were made to collect their medals from tables on the pitch; nobody from the RFEF presented Barcelona with their champions' cup; and it took some time before an official gave Aitana her MVP trophy. A video of the players collecting their own medals quickly went viral in Spain, and some media reported that the RFEF officials did not want to give the teams a reception as they both have multiple players in "the 15" who are in dispute with the RFEF over the conditions of the Spanish women's national team. The RFEF responded that it was protocol to have players collect their own medals in both the men's and women's Supercopas; journalists and social media pointed out that when the men's final had been played earlier in the month in Riyadh, RFEF president Luis Rubiales awarded medals to each player on a stage. The RFEF said that the pitch selected for the women's final was too "old and small" to make it easy for officials to go to the pitch, or for all players to fit in the box. The medal protocol had not been explained to the teams before the match, with the RFEF noting that they had not asked. While Barcelona coach Jonatan Giráldez said he had not noticed his players be disappointed; that he did not find anything unusual with the lack of ceremony because the women's team has always had such treatment; and he accepted the protocol explanation, he still felt that the RFEF should have found a way to give them a proper medal ceremony. The Association of Spanish Footballers (AFE) criticised the RFEF, saying that the teams were undervalued during their celebration and were victims of discrimination, accusing the RFEF of not promoting women's football, a heated issue in Spain at the time.

After receiving the Copa de la Reina match complaint from Osasuna, the RFEF handed out its first judgment on 24 January. Despite Barcelona's dominant win, and while accepting that they did not list Geyse's suspension on their website, the RFEF disqualified Barcelona's result in the match (as a knock-out match, the technical loss would see them expelled from the tournament) and fined them €1,001 (in application of article 79, sections 1 and 2. b), of the Disciplinary Code of the RFEF). The RFEF handed the same judgment to Sevilla, who also fielded a suspended player in their Copa de la Reina match on the same day, which also was not listed by the RFEF. While another system did show the suspensions in the match results from the previous season, the match results can only be viewed by the clubs involved, and Geyse had moved club. The teams were given 10 days to appeal the verdict; Barcelona said that they will and, "should the sanction not be revoked on appeal, FC Barcelona will take every possible action, as it is considered that the line-up ended up being deemed ineligible due to technicalities in this case."

On 25 January, Barcelona won their 50th consecutive league match in defeating Levante Las Planas 7–0; Asisat Oshoala scored the season's second hat-trick, with Ana-Maria Crnogorčević taking a brace, and a goal each being scored by Mariona Caldentey and Vicky López. In doing so, Vicky became Barcelona's youngest ever first-team goal-scorer, at just 16 years, 5 months and 27 days (16 years, 183 days). FIFA had reported at the start of 2023 that the team could become the first football team (men's or women's) in history to achieve 50 consecutive league victories, having surpassed Lyon's 46-win record at the end of 2022; though Barcelona achieved the FIFA-certified record, the Arsenal women reached a record 51 consecutive league victories in the pre-professional era. Arsenal also achieved a 108-unbeaten run, (the FIFA record for this is held by the Steaua București men's team, with 104). Hat-trick scorer Oshoala has previously played for Arsenal.

On 26 January, the team's Swedish forward Fridolina Rolfö extended her contract until 30 June 2026. On the same day, the International Federation of Football History & Statistics released its ranking of the Women's World Best Club for 2022, updating its criteria to use performance data from both domestic and international competitions, as they used for the men's club ranking, rather than a vote. Barcelona femení was ranked first as the best women's club in the world, with 738 points, nearly 200 points clear of second place. The next day, defender Irene Paredes extended her contract until 30 June 2025.

On 29 January, Barcelona beat Granadilla Tenerife 6–0 away. Clàudia Pina, Aitana Bonmatí and Lucy Bronze all contributed to the win with one goal each, while Asisat Oshoala got her second hat-trick of the season just four days after her first, achieving two hat-tricks in two consecutive matches. The first five goals were scored in the first half, with Bronze's coming at 90+2' just before the match ended. It was the 100th Barcelona match for Ana-Maria Crnogorčević.

On 31 January, at the end of the winter transfer window, Barcelona signed Italian midfielder Giulia Dragoni, to join the B side. She became the first non-Spanish female player to join La Masia.

=== February ===
On 1 February, Barcelona achieved their 52nd consecutive league win by defeating Valencia 4–0 away, overtaking Arsenal's 51, to hold the absolute longest league winning streak in football.

On 2 February, FC Barcelona was awarded an Enderrock Catalan music award on behalf of its first football teams. Through the partnership with Spotify, the club had helped popularise Catalan music, including by promoting local artists and playing their music at matches.

On 5 February, Barcelona defeated Real Betis 7–0. One goal each was scored by Geyse Ferreira, Clàudia Pina, Mariona Caldentey and Keira Walsh, in her first goal for the club, with another hat-trick for Asisat Oshoala, her third hat-trick in 11 days. Fridolina Rolfö took a hat-trick of assists, providing for Pina and Oshoala's first and second.

The draw for the Champions League knockout stages was held on 10 February at UEFA headquarters in Nyon, with the full bracket to the final announced. As Barcelona finished top of their group, they were one of four seeded teams. Barcelona were drawn against debutants Roma in the quarter-final; it was soon announced that the first leg of the tie, with Roma at home, will be played at Stadio Olimpico on 21 March, with the second leg to be played at Camp Nou on 29 March. The winner on aggregate will advance to the semi-finals, where they will face the winner of the tie between Chelsea and Lyon.

On 11 February, Barcelona defeated Deportivo Alavés 4–0 away, in what was their last match of February ahead of the international break. Goals were scored by Asisat Oshoala, Aitana Bonmatí and Clàudia Pina, and an own goal was scored by Deportivo Alavés' defender Osinachi Ohale.

The FIFA FIFPRO Women's World Squad was announced on 13 February, with eight Barcelona players making the 23-player list: Sandra Paños was one of three goalkeepers; Lucy Bronze, Mapi León and Irene Paredes were among the seven defenders; and Aitana Bonmatí, Caroline Graham Hansen, Alexia Putellas, and Keira Walsh made up over half of the midfield. From the World Squad, a World XI is set to be announced at the end of the month, along with the winner of The Best FIFA Women's Player.

On 20 February, Aitana Bonmatí received the Barça Players Award for the second consecutive time, awarded by the FC Barcelona Players Association in recognition of her fair play during the previous season. This same day the nominations for the Laureus World Sports Awards were announced: Alexia Putellas was nominated for Sportswoman of the Year for the second consecutive year. On 21 February, goalkeeper Cata Coll extended her contract until 30 June 2026, with forward Clàudia Pina extending her contract to the same date on 22 February.

Also on 22 February, defender Bronze and midfielder Walsh won the 2023 Arnold Clark Cup, retaining it for England.

On 27 February, the ceremony for The Best FIFA Football Awards 2022 was held in Paris. Out of the eight Barcelona players shortlisted for the FIFA FIFPRO Women's World 11, four of them were included in the 2022 FIFPRO World 11: Lucy Bronze (in her fifth appearance), Mapi León, Keira Walsh and Alexia Putellas. With four players, Barcelona was the joint-most represented team on the list (along with the England women's national team). Putellas also won the 2022 award for The Best FIFA Women's Player, taking the title for the second consecutive year. Barcelona extended their lead as the club with the most The Best Women's Player awards, with three, following Putellas' win the year before and Lieke Martens' win in 2017. No other club has won it more than once.

=== March ===
On 5 March, following the international break, Barcelona defeated Villarreal 5–0 to achieve their 50th consecutive league win under Jonatan Giráldez (out of 50). Asisat Oshoala and Salma Paralluelo scored one goal each. Norwegian forward Caroline Graham Hansen came on in the 65th minute after four months out with injury, scoring a hat-trick. Jana Fernández also made her first appearance after over a year of recovery following an injury she suffered on 14 February 2022. Aitana Bonmatí recorded a hat-trick of assists, providing for Paralluelo and Graham Hansen's first and second goals. Before the match, the four winners of The Best were presented with their trophies on the pitch, sharing them with the fans. Later in the day, they received the same ovation at the Camp Nou before the men's match against Valencia.

Spain's court of arbitration for sport dismissed Barcelona's appeal to be reinstated in the Copa de la Reina on 10 March. Without reviewing the case, it upheld the sanction, which had also been upheld by the appeals committee. Though the last avenue of sporting appeal, Barcelona would still be able to challenge the decision in a legal court, which Catalan state broadcaster CCMA suggested they may choose to do for precedent.

On 11 March, Barcelona beat Levante 4–0 away, with Aitana Bonmatí scoring two goals, while Clàudia Pina and Fridolina Rolfö scored one goal each.

On 17 March, the team continued their winning streak with a 5–1 comeback victory against Valencia. Both Fridolina Rolfö and Salma Paralluelo scored braces and Marta Torrejón scored one goal, with Aitana Bonmatí taking another hat-trick of assists. Cata Coll made her first appearance after over a year of recovery following injury, coming on towards the end of the match. The team came close to breaking their own league record of minutes played without conceding a goal, which was achieved during the 2020–21 season and stood at 962 minutes, but an early concession prevented this by five minutes.

On 21 March, Barcelona took a narrow 1–0 away victory against Roma in the first leg of their Champions League quarter-finals tie with a goal from Salma Paralluelo, in front of a record Italian women's club football attendance of 39,454 spectators at the Stadio Olimpico.

On 25 March, the team defeated Real Madrid 1–0 in their third El Clásico of the season, taking their winning streak against Real Madrid to 11 in as many matches across all competitions. Fridolina Rolfö converted a penalty in the 77th minute to give the team the win in front of a new all-time record attendance at the Estadi Johan Cruyff, with 5,569 spectators attending the match.

Barcelona ended the month with a 5–1 victory over Roma in the second leg of the Champions League quarter-finals tie on 29 March, advancing to the semi-finals of the Champions League for the fifth consecutive season. 54,667 spectators attended the match, the third-highest attendance in the competition's history. The first, second, and previous third-highest attendances were also for Barcelona matches. Mapi León's goal scored in the 33rd minute from outside the box, was chosen as the Goal of the Week for the 2nd legs of the quarter-finals of the Champions League quarter-finals.

=== April ===
On the second day of the new month, Barcelona beat Alhama 2–0 away. Caroline Graham Hansen scored the team's 100th goal in the league, with the second an own goal scored by Alhama midfielder Lucía Martínez. Barcelona achieved more than 100 goals in the league for the fourth time in its history and the third consecutive season.

During the international break, on 6 April, Keira Walsh and Lucy Bronze of England, and Geyse of Brazil, contested the 2023 Women's Finalissima. England won after penalties, with Walsh being named player of the match, Bronze assisting England's goal, and Geyse nearly scoring from distance.

After the international break, Barcelona achieved their 60th consecutive league win by defeating Atlético Madrid 4–0. A brace from Aitana Bonmatí, and goals from Vicky López and Caroline Graham Hansen, also helped the team register +100 goal difference in the league, scoring 105 goals and conceding only 5.

On 22 April, Barcelona defeated Chelsea 1–0 away in the first leg of their Champions League semi-final tie, the goal scored in the fourth minute by Caroline Graham Hansen in front of 27,697 spectators at Stamford Bridge: a then-record crowd for a Women's Champions League attendance in the United Kingdom. Graham Hansen was also named player of the match, with the goal chosen as the Goal of the Week for the 1st legs of the semi-finals. Five days later, the return leg of the semi-final took place on 27 April at Camp Nou in front of a crowd of 72,262 spectators, the third-largest in the competition's history. Barcelona were held to a 1–1 draw, their first draw of the season in all competitions, and advanced to the 2023 UEFA Women's Champions League final by winning the tie 2–1 on aggregate for their third consecutive Champions League final appearance, and fourth appearance in the last five seasons. Caroline Graham Hansen again scored the team's only goal, which was chosen as the Goal of the Week for the 2nd leg of the semi-finals, with Aitana Bonmatí the player of the match.

On 30 April, Barcelona became mathematically unbeatable in the league, winning it hours after the B team similarly won their league on points; the C team had also won their league on points in the days before and were celebrated for their victory ahead of the first team match on this day. The first team's league title was their fourth consecutive, and a record eighth victory; to achieve it, they beat Sporting de Huelva 3–0 in front of 5,289 supporters at Estadi Johan Cruyff. Both Laia Codina and Jana Fernández scored their first goals of the season, with the final goal coming from Asisat Oshoala. The team won the league with a perfect record for the second season, and achieved their 61st consecutive league victory. The match also saw the return of Alexia Putellas to the pitch after her ACL injury in July 2022. The team celebrated their win, the first with the league fully professional, at a beachside restaurant in Gavà, where Barcelona president Joan Laporta thanked the team for performing and their success throughout the season, and promised to continue investing in women's football.

=== May ===
The team began May continuing their winning streak, beating Real Sociedad 5–2 away for their 27th consecutive victory in the 2022–23 league season, 62nd in total. Caroline Graham Hansen scored twice, with Patricia Guijarro, Asisat Oshoala and Aitana Bonmatí also getting on the scoresheet with a goal each.

Comparatively, the team underperformed for the rest of the month, seeing out the league season with only one further victory from three games. On 10 May, Barcelona were held to a 1–1 draw away against Sevilla, with Ana-Maria Crnogorčević scoring their only goal, capping their winning run at 62. It was also the team's first league draw in nearly three and a half years. Having ended their record run for consecutive victories in a top-flight league, the team managed to continue their unbeaten run through this game and the next, a 3–0 victory over Athletic Club in Barcelona's last home game of the season on 13 May. Goals were scored by Caroline Graham Hansen, Irene Paredes and Salma Paralluelo.

The team took part in a joint league victory celebration, with the men's first team, on 15 May; thousands of fans filled the streets of Barcelona as the teams rode open top buses on a victory parade from the Camp Nou to the Arc de Triomf lasting three hours.

In the last league game of the season on 21 May, Barcelona's unbeaten run of 64 games came to an end, with the team losing 1–2 away to Madrid CFF, a team they had defeated 7–0 at the start of the season. The start of their record run had been 719 days – just short of two years – prior, when they lost to Atlético Madrid on 1 June 2021. After going 2–0 down, Alexia Putellas scored the team's consolation goal a minute after being substituted on in the second half; it was her first goal since she returned from injury and her first Barcelona goal in nearly a year, since 29 May 2022.

=== June 2023 ===
On 3 June, Barcelona achieved a comeback victory against VfL Wolfsburg in the Champions League final at Philips Stadion in the Netherlands, winning 3–2 in front of 33,147 fans — a record crowd for a women's game in the Netherlands. This was Barcelona's second Champions League title, seeing them end the season with a continental treble. The match started badly for the Blaugrana, conceding a goal in the third minute; in the rest of the first half, Barcelona started to dominate the match, creating but not completing chances. Wolfsburg were more clinical, and scored another goal shortly before half time. Barcelona's dominance continued in the second half, with more composure in front of goal: Patri Guijarro scored two goals in two minutes (48', 50') to level the scores within five minutes of being back on the pitch. Barcelona maintained control for the remainder of the game, with Fridolina Rolfö scoring the match-winning third goal for the team in the 70th minute. Patri Guijarro was named Player of the Match.

The next day, they received a formal reception at the Generalitat de Catalunya, the first time women had received this honour.

== Players ==
=== Current squad ===
As of 17 September 2022

Note: Flags indicate national team as defined under FIFA eligibility rules; some limited exceptions apply. Players may hold more than one non-FIFA nationality.

No.	Pos.	Nation	Player
1	GK	ESP	Sandra Paños (3rd captain)
2	DF	ESP	Irene Paredes (5th captain)
3	DF	ESP	Laia Codina
4	DF	ESP	María Pilar León
5	DF	ESP	Jana Fernández
6	FW	ESP	Clàudia Pina
7	DF	SUI	Ana-Maria Crnogorčević
8	DF	ESP	Marta Torrejón (vice-captain)
9	FW	ESP	Mariona Caldentey
10	FW	NOR	Caroline Graham Hansen
11	MF	ESP	Alexia Putellas (captain)
12	MF	ESP	Patricia Guijarro (4th captain)
13	GK	ESP	Cata Coll

No.	Pos.	Nation	Player
14	MF	ESP	Aitana Bonmatí
15	DF	ENG	Lucy Bronze
16	FW	SWE	Fridolina Rolfö
17	FW	ESP	Salma Paralluelo
18	FW	BRA	Geyse Ferreira
19	FW	ESP	Bruna Vilamala
20	FW	NGR	Asisat Oshoala
21	MF	ENG	Keira Walsh
22	DF	ESP	Nuria Rábano
23	MF	NOR	Ingrid Engen
24	GK	ESP	Gemma Font
25	DF	ESP	Emma Ramírez

=== FC Barcelona Femení B ===
Players from FC Barcelona Femení B and FC Barcelona Femení C who have a squad number and are eligible to play for the first team.

As of 27 March 2023 (Note: Ona Baradad was eligible during the season, but was de-registered from the main squad following long-term injury.)

Note: Flags indicate national team as defined under FIFA eligibility rules; some limited exceptions apply. Players may hold more than one non-FIFA nationality.

No.	Pos.	Nation	Player
27	MF	ESP	María Pérez
28	MF	ESP	Alba Caño
29	MF	ESP	Nina Pou
30	MF	ESP	Vicky López
31	FW	ESP	Laia Martret
32	FW	ESP	Ariana Arias
34	DF	ESP	Martina Fernández
35	DF	ESP	Judit Pujols

No.	Pos.	Nation	Player
36	GK	ESP	Meritxell Muñoz
37	GK	ESP	Meritxell Font
38	DF	ESP	Ariadna Mingueza
39	MF	ESP	Júlia Bartel
40	FW	ESP	Lucía Corrales
41	DF	ESP	Noah Bezis Ureña
42	FW	ESP	Magali Capdevila
45	MF	ITA	Giulia Dragoni

=== Contract renewals ===
No.	Pos.	Nat.	Name	Date	Until	Source
3	DF	(Spain)	Laia Codina	4 June 2022	30 June 2024	
24	GK	(Spain)	Gemma Font	6 June 2022	30 June 2024	
7	DF	(Switzerland)	Ana-Maria Crnogorčević	7 June 2022	30 June 2024	
25	DF	(Spain)	Emma Ramírez	26 July 2022	30 June 2024	
5	DF	(Spain)	Jana Fernández	22 December 2022	30 June 2025	
10	FW	(Norway)	Caroline Graham Hansen	16 January 2023	30 June 2026	
23	MF	(Norway)	Ingrid Syrstad Engen	17 January 2023	30 June 2025	
16	FW	(Sweden)	Fridolina Rolfö	26 January 2023	30 June 2026	
2	DF	(Spain)	Irene Paredes	27 January 2023	30 June 2025	
13	GK	(Spain)	Cata Coll	21 February 2023	30 June 2026	
6	FW	(Spain)	Clàudia Pina	22 February 2023	30 June 2026	
19	FW	(Spain)	Bruna Vilamala	12 April 2023	30 June 2026	
Coach		(Spain)	Jonatan Giráldez	3 June 2022	30 June 2024	

== Transfers ==
=== In ===
No.	Pos.	Nat.	Player	Moving from	Type	Source
Summer
3	DF	(Spain)	Laia Codina	(Italy) AC Milan	Loan return	
–	FW	(Brazil)	Gio Queiroz	Levante	Loan return	
21	MF	(Spain)	Andrea Falcón	Levante	Loan return	
22	DF	(Spain)	Nuria Rábano	Real Sociedad	Transfer	
15	DF	(England)	Lucy Bronze	(England) Manchester City	Transfer	
18	FW	(Brazil)	Geyse Ferreira	Madrid CFF	Transfer	
–	FW	(Spain)	Candela Andújar	Valencia	Loan return	
17	FW	(Spain)	Salma Paralluelo	Villarreal	Transfer	
25	DF	(Spain)	Emma Ramírez	Real Sociedad	Loan return	
21	MF	(England)	Keira Walsh	(England) Manchester City	Transfer	
Winter
–	MF	(Spain)	Ornella Vignola	Sevilla	Loan return	
45	MF	(Italy)	Giulia Dragoni	(Italy) Inter Milan	Transfer	

=== Out ===
No.	Pos.	Nat.	Player	Moving to	Type	Source
Summer
15	DF	(Spain)	Leila Ouahabi	(England) Manchester City	End of contract	
10	FW	(Spain)	Jennifer Hermoso	(Mexico) Pachuca	End of contract	
22	FW	(Netherlands)	Lieke Martens	(France) Paris Saint-Germain	End of contract	
–	MF	(Spain)	Ornella Vignola	Sevilla	Loan	
5	DF	(Spain)	Melanie Serrano	Retired		
–	FW	(Spain)	Candela Andújar	Retired		
17	DF	(Spain)	Andrea Pereira	(Mexico) América	Contract termination	
21	MF	(Spain)	Andrea Falcón	(Mexico) América	Contract termination	
–	FW	(Brazil)	Gio Queiroz	(England) Arsenal	Transfer	
Winter
–	MF	(Spain)	Ornella Vignola	Alavés	Loan	
44	FW	(Spain)	Esther Laborde	Alavés	Loan	

== Competitions ==
=== Overall record ===
Competition	First match	Last match	Starting round	Final position	Record							
Competition	First match	Last match	Starting round	Final position	Pld	W	D	L	GF	GA	GD	Win %
Liga F	17 September 2022 (Note: Matchday 2 was played, on 17 September 2022, before Matchday 1 (played 3 November 2022) due to referee strikes.)	21 May 2023	Matchday 1	Winners	30	28	1	1	118	10	+108	93.33
Copa de la Reina	10 January 2023	10 January 2023	Round of 16	Round of 16 *	1	1	0	0	9	0	+9	100.00
Supercopa de España Femenina	19 January 2023	22 January 2023	Semi-finals	Winners	2	2	0	0	6	1	+5	100.00
UEFA Women's Champions League	19 October 2022	3 June 2023	Group stage	Winners	11	9	1	1	40	10	+30	81.82
Total					44	40	2	2	173	21	+152	90.91

Source: Competitions

=== Pre-season and friendlies ===
Barcelona opened the pre-season with a 10–0 demolition of AEM Lleida in a friendly, which included a hat-trick from Graham Hansen. They then travelled to France to take part in the friendly AMOS Women's French Cup. They lost 1–2 to Bayern Munich in their semi-final before winning 1(5)–1(4) on penalties against Paris Saint-Germain in the third place play-off match. Back at home, Barcelona retained the Joan Gamper Trophy by beating Montpellier 6–0. They concluded the pre-season with a 2–4 win on penalties against Granadilla Tenerife to win the invitational Teide Trophy for the first time.

Win Draw Loss Fixtures

6 August 2022 Friendly	Barcelona (Spain)	10–0	(Spain) AEM Lleida	Sant Joan Despí, Spain
19:00 CEST (UTC+2)	Hansen 2', 18', 41' (pen.), (yellow card) 42'; Martret 17'; Pina 45+2' (pen.), 50'; Crnogorčević 66'; Bonmatí 76' (pen.); Santiago 86' (o.g.); Arias 88'	Report		Stadium: Estadi Johan Cruyff; Attendance: 4,515; Referee: Ylenia Sánchez Miguel (Spain)

16 August 2022 AMOS Women's French Cup – Semi-final	Barcelona (Spain)	1–2	(Germany) Bayern Munich	Toulouse, France
18:00 CEST (UTC+2)	Hansen 59'	Report	Gwinn 40'; Laurent 84'; Damnjanović (yellow card) 87'	Stadium: Stade Ernest-Wallon; Attendance: 3,500; Referee: Charlène Laur (France)

19 August 2022 AMOS Women's French Cup – Third place play-off	Barcelona (Spain)	1–1 (5–4 p)	(France) Paris Saint-Germain	Toulouse, France
18:00 CEST (UTC+2)	Geyse 39'; Mapi León (red card) 78'; Bronze (yellow card) 90'	Report	Ngueleu 30'; Jean-François (yellow card) 90+1'	Stadium: Stade Ernest-Wallon; Attendance: 5,000; Referee: Maika Vanderstichel (France)
	Penalties
	Hansen (penalty scored); Pina (penalty scored); Engen (penalty scored); Rolfö (penalty scored); Bronze (penalty scored)		(penalty scored) Dudek; (penalty scored) Diani; (penalty missed) Karchaoui; (penalty scored) Lawrence

23 August 2022 Joan Gamper Trophy	Barcelona (Spain)	6–0	(France) Montpellier	Sant Joan Despí, Spain
20:00 CEST (UTC+2)	Geyse 23', 52'; Guijarro 28', 45', (penalty missed) 90+4'; Rolfö 54'; Arias 77'	Report	Coquet (yellow card) 90'	Stadium: Estadi Johan Cruyff; Attendance: 5,125; Referee: Alicia Espinosa Ríos (Spain)

27 August 2022 Trofeo Teide	UDG Tenerife (Spain)	1–1 (2–4 p)	(Spain) Barcelona	La Orotava, Spain
21:00 CEST (UTC+2)	Ortega 43'	Report	Geyse 29'	Stadium: Los Cuartos; Attendance: 6,275; Referee: Xiomara Díaz García (Spain)
	Penalties
	Ramos (penalty missed); Ortíz (penalty scored); Robledo (penalty missed); Doblado (penalty scored)		(penalty scored) Hansen; (penalty scored) Paredes; (penalty scored) Patri Guijarro; (penalty scored) Mapi León

=== Liga F ===
==== League table ====
Pos	Team	Pld	W	D	L	GF	GA	GD	Pts	Qualification or relegation
1	Barcelona (C)	30	28	1	1	118	10	+108	85	Qualification for the Champions League group stage
2	Real Madrid	30	24	3	3	80	25	+55	75	Qualification for the Champions League second round
3	Levante	30	21	3	6	80	34	+46	66	Qualification for the Champions League first round
4	Atlético de Madrid	30	16	9	5	54	35	+19	57	
5	Madrid CFF	30	17	5	8	65	48	+17	56	

Source: Liga F
Rules for classification: 1) Points; 2) Head-to-head points; 3) Goal difference; 4) Number of goals scored
(C) Champions

==== Results summary ====
Overall								Home						Away					
Pld	W	D	L	GF	GA	GD	Pts	W	D	L	GF	GA	GD	W	D	L	GF	GA	GD
30	28	1	1	118	10	+108	85	15	0	0	64	3	+61	13	1	1	54	7	+47

Source: La Liga

==== Results by round ====
Round	1	2	3	4	5	6	7	8	9	10	11	12	13	14	15	16	17	18	19	20	21	22	23	24	25	26	27	28	29	30
Ground	A	H	A	H	A	A	H	A	H	A	H	H	A	H	A	H	A	H	A	H	A	H	H	A	H	A	H	A	H	A
Result	W	W	W	W	W	W	W	W	W	W	W	W	W	W	W	W	W	W	W	W	W	W	W	W	W	D	W	W	W	L
Position	1	3	1	1	1	1	1	1	1	1	1	1	1	1	1	1	1	1	1	1	1	1	1	1	1	1	1	1	1	1

Source: La Liga
A = Away; H = Home; W = Win; D = Draw; L = Loss; P = Postponed

==== Matches ====
17 September 2022 2	Barcelona	2–0	UDG Tenerife	Sant Joan Despí
12:00 CEST (UTC+2)	Paredes (yellow card) 23'; Geyse 60'; Hansen 67'	Report	Cáceres (yellow card) 41'; Roldán (yellow card) 51'	Stadium: Estadi Johan Cruyff; Attendance: 4,477; Referee: María Dolores Martínez Madrona

25 September 2022 3	Villarreal	1–4	Barcelona	Villarreal
17:00 CEST (UTC+2)	Guijarro (yellow card) 47'; García 56'	Report	Mapi León 26'; Oshoala 48'; Pina 75'; Hansen (yellow card) 81'; Mata 85' (o.g.)	Stadium: Ciudad Deportiva Pamesa Cerámica; Attendance: 2,200; Referee: Elia María Martínez Martínez

1 October 2022 4	Barcelona	7–0	Madrid CFF	Sant Joan Despí
18:15 CEST (UTC+2)	Hansen (yellow card) 4' (goal) 22'; Caldentey 59', 65'; Geyse 61', 68'; Crnogorčević 77', 78'	Report	González (yellow card) 26'; Laurita (yellow card) 43'	Stadium: Estadi Johan Cruyff; Attendance: 5,087; Referee: Zulema González González

15 October 2022 5	Athletic Club	0–3	Barcelona	Lezama
17:45 CEST (UTC+2)		Report	Mapi León (yellow card) 37'; Pina 50'; Geyse 58'; Caldentey 84'	Stadium: Lezama (Field 1); Attendance: 2,041; Referee: Patricia Luna Varo

22 October 2022 6	Real Betis	0–3	Barcelona	Seville
18:15 CEST (UTC+2)		Report	Rolfö 42'; Babajide 75' (o.g.); Hansen 86'	Stadium: Estadio Municipal Felipe del Valle; Attendance: 750; Referee: Beatriz Arregui Gamir

30 October 2022 7	Barcelona	2–1	Levante	Sant Joan Despí
12:00 CET (UTC+1)	Engen 15'; Aitana 41'	Report	Lloris (yellow card) 30'; Redondo 43'	Stadium: Estadi Johan Cruyff; Attendance: 5,143; Referee: Olatz Rivera Olmedo

3 November 2022 1	Levante Las Planas	0–4	Barcelona	Sant Joan Despí
21:00 CET (UTC+1)	Muth (yellow card) 75'	Report	Rábano (yellow card) 9'; Guijarro 11'; Oshoala 26'; Paralluelo 32'; Paredes 79'	Stadium: Municipal de Les Planes; Attendance: 1,500; Referee: Beatriz Arregui Gamir
Note: Opening match was originally scheduled for 11 September 2022, but was postponed due to absence of match officials.

6 November 2022 8	Real Madrid	0–4	Barcelona	Madrid
18:00 CET (UTC+1)		Report	Crnogorčević 4'; Guijarro 44'; Aitana 52'; Rolfö (yellow card) 61', (goal) 81'; Geyse (yellow card) 68'	Stadium: Estadio Alfredo Di Stéfano; Attendance: 5,126; Referee: Marta Frías Acedo

20 November 2022 9	Barcelona	8–0	Alavés	Sant Joan Despí
12:00 CET (UTC+1)	Pina 8', 36' (pen.); Oshoala 12'; Rolfö 25', (yellow card) 68'; Mapi León 43', (yellow card) 47'; Paralluelo 56'; Crnogorčević 85'; Geyse 90+6'	Report	Sole (yellow card) 35'; Vergés (yellow card) 90+3'	Stadium: Estadi Johan Cruyff; Attendance: 4,420; Referee: Raquel Suárez González

27 November 2022 10	Atlético Madrid	1–6	Barcelona	Madrid
16:30 CET (UTC+1)	Santos 25' (pen.), (yellow card) 80'	Report	Crnogorčević 4', (yellow card) 38'; Paños (yellow card) 24'; Mapi León 35'; Bronze 50'; Caldentey (yellow card) 65'; Paralluelo 72', 76'; Engen 80'	Stadium: Cívitas Metropolitano; Attendance: 24,107; Referee: Zulema González González

3 December 2022 11	Barcelona	2–1	Real Sociedad	Sant Joan Despí
12:00 CET (UTC+1)	Bonmatí (yellow card) 43'; Torrejón 62'; Bronze 89'; Paños (yellow card) 90+3'	Report	Tejada (yellow card) 15'; Le Guilly 44'	Stadium: Estadi Johan Cruyff; Attendance: 4,559; Referee: Elia María Martínez Martínez

10 December 2022 12	Barcelona	4–0	Alhama	Sant Joan Despí
19:00 CET (UTC+1)	Pina 4'; Paralluelo 31'; Vilamala 58'; Oshoala 86'	Report	Flores (yellow card) 26' (yellow-red card) 67'; Fresneda (yellow card) 29'; Carid (yellow card) 57'	Stadium: Estadi Johan Cruyff; Attendance: 2,758; Referee: Patricia Luna Varo

7 January 2023 14	Barcelona	4–0	Sevilla	Sant Joan Despí
18:15 CET (UTC+1)	Oshoala 11'; Pina 34', (penalty missed) 45+2'; Paralluelo 70', 84'	Report	Gabarro (yellow card) 66'	Stadium: Estadi Johan Cruyff; Attendance: 5,098; Referee: Elena Peláez Arnillas

14 January 2023 15	Sporting de Huelva	0–3	Barcelona	Huelva
12:00 CET (UTC+1)		Report	Oshoala 21', 57'; Caldentey 32'	Stadium: Estadio Nuevo Colombino; Attendance: 3,200; Referee: Elisabeth Calvo Valentín

25 January 2023 16	Barcelona	7–0	Levante Las Planas	Sant Joan Despí
18:00 CET (UTC+1)	Crnogorčević 8', 41'; Oshoala 25', 56', 63'; Vicky López 48'; Caldentey 75'	Report	Chikwelu (yellow card) 27'; Martín-Pozuelo (yellow card) 62'; Mrabet (yellow card) 78'	Stadium: Estadi Johan Cruyff; Attendance: 2,970; Referee: Patricia Luna Varo

29 January 2023 17	UDG Tenerife	0–6	Barcelona	Santa Cruz de Tenerife
18:00 CET (UTC+1)		Report	Pina 5'; Oshoala 8', 12', 27'; Bonmatí 45'; Bronze 90+2'	Stadium: Estadio Heliodoro Rodríguez López; Attendance: 8,115; Referee: Arantza Gallastegui Pérez

1 February 2023 13	Valencia	0–4	Barcelona	Paterna
19:00 CET (UTC+1)		Report	Rolfö 3'; Oshoala 15'; Torrejón 22'; Bonmatí 47'	Stadium: Estadio Antonio Puchades; Attendance: 3,500; Referee: María Gloria Planes Terol
Note: The match was originally scheduled for 18 December 2022, but was postponed due to Barcelona's UEFA Women's Champions League match.

5 February 2023 18	Barcelona	7–0	Real Betis	Sant Joan Despí
16:00 CET (UTC+1)	Geyse 14'; Walsh 38'; Pina 48'; Codina (yellow card) 53'; Oshoala 61', 77', 90+2'; Caldentey 64'	Report	Quiles (yellow card) 57'; Leire (yellow card) 75'	Stadium: Estadi Johan Cruyff; Attendance: 4,898; Referee: Xiomara Díaz García

11 February 2023 19	Alavés	0–4	Barcelona	Vitoria-Gasteiz
18:15 CET (UTC+1)	Laborde (yellow card) 70'	Report	Geyse (yellow card) 14'; Oshoala 33'; Ohale 39' (o.g.); Paredes (yellow card) 50'; Bonmatí 64'; Pina 84'	Stadium: Ciudad Deportiva José Luis Compañón; Attendance: 800; Referee: Raquel Suárez González

5 March 2023 20	Barcelona	5–0	Villarreal	Sant Joan Despí
12:00 CET (UTC+1)	Oshoala 21'; Paralluelo 38'; Hansen 70', 84', 90'	Report		Stadium: Estadi Johan Cruyff; Attendance: 5,026; Referee: María Eugenia Gil Soriano

11 March 2023 21	Levante	0–4	Barcelona	Buñol
18:15 CET (UTC+1)		Report	Bonmatí 29', 77'; Oshoala (yellow card) 32'; Mapi León (yellow card) 66'; Pina 87'; Rolfö 90+4'	Stadium: Ciudad Deportiva de Buñol; Attendance: 580; Referee: Zulema González González

17 March 2023 22	Barcelona	5–1	Valencia	Sant Joan Despí
19:00 CET (UTC+1)	Rolfö 26', 90+4' (pen.); Torrejón 45+2'; Paralluelo 60', 66'	Report	Jiménez 12', (yellow card) 60'; Carro (yellow card) 60'	Stadium: Estadi Johan Cruyff; Attendance: 4,492; Referee: Paola Cebollada López

25 March 2023 23	Barcelona	1–0	Real Madrid	Sant Joan Despí
18:15 CEST (UTC+2)	Geyse (yellow card) 46'; Rolfö 77' (pen.)	Report	Zornoza (yellow card) 43'; Del Castillo (yellow card) 76'	Stadium: Estadi Johan Cruyff; Attendance: 5,569; Referee: Olatz Rivera Olmedo

2 April 2023 24	Alhama	0–2	Barcelona	Alhama de Murcia
18:00 CEST (UTC+2)	Pérez (yellow card) 42'; Caravaca (yellow card) 59'	Report	Crnogorčević (yellow card) 5'; Geyse (yellow card) 28'; Vilamala (yellow card) 40'; Hansen 57'; Martínez 60' (o.g.)	Stadium: José Kubala – Guadalentin Sports Complex; Attendance: 2,500; Referee: Raquel Suárez González

15 April 2023 25	Barcelona	4–0	Atlético Madrid	Sant Joan Despí
12:00 CEST (UTC+2)	Bonmatí 28', 89'; Vicky López 46'; Hansen 57'	Report	Moral (yellow card) 44'; Lundkvist (yellow card) 77'; Navarro (yellow card) 80'	Stadium: Estadi Johan Cruyff; Attendance: 4,850; Referee: Arantza Gallastegui Pérez

30 April 2023 27	Barcelona	3–0	Sporting de Huelva	Sant Joan Despí
16:00 CEST (UTC+2)	Fernández (yellow card) 33', (goal) 63'; Codina 39'; Oshoala 89'	Report		Stadium: Estadi Johan Cruyff; Attendance: 5,289; Referee: Alicia Espinosa Ríos

6 May 2023 28	Real Sociedad	2–5	Barcelona	San Sebastián
18:15 CEST (UTC+2)	Jensen 38'; Guijarro 64' (o.g.)	Report	Caldentey (yellow card) 11'; Guijarro 21'; Oshoala 25'; Bonmatí 29'; Hansen 32', 58'	Stadium: Zubieta; Attendance: 1,307; Referee: Xiomara Díaz García

10 May 2023 26	Sevilla	1–1	Barcelona	Seville
19:00 CEST (UTC+2)	Gomes (yellow card) 25'; Martín-Prieto 53'; Martínez (yellow card) 88'	Report	M. Fernández (yellow card) 38'; Crnogorčević 80'	Stadium: Estadio Jesús Navas; Attendance: 1,356; Referee: María Gloria Planes Terol
Note: The match was originally scheduled for 23 April 2023, but was postponed due to Barcelona's Champions League semi-final first leg match.

13 May 2023 29	Barcelona	3–0	Athletic Club	Sant Joan Despí
12:00 CEST (UTC+2)	Hansen 61'; Paredes 67'; Paralluelo 90+4'	Report		Stadium: Estadi Johan Cruyff; Attendance: 4,641; Referee: Raquel Suárez González

21 May 2023 30	Madrid CFF	2–1	Barcelona	Fuenlabrada
12:00 CEST (UTC+2)	Kundananji 30', 37'; Lauren (yellow card) 90+2'; Pardo (yellow card) 90+4'	Report	Geyse (yellow card) 12'; Caldentey (yellow card) 59'; Mapi León (yellow card) 61'; Putellas 64'; Pina (yellow card) 81'	Stadium: Estadio Fernando Torres; Attendance: 1,203; Referee: Elena Peláez Arnillas

Source: La Liga

=== Copa de la Reina ===
Barcelona entered in the Round of 16. The draw was held on 15 November 2022, and they were paired with Osasuna who they defeated 0–9. Despite the dominant win, on 24 January 2023, the Royal Spanish Football Federation (RFEF) disqualified the team for fielding an ineligible player. Geyse Ferreira, who played the match, did not serve her suspension after being sent off in her last match which she played for a different team during the previous season. The RFEF accepted that they made a mistake when listing suspensions by not including Geyse, but also said that Barcelona should have been more diligent in checking. Being handed a disqualification meant elimination from the tournament as the match was in the knock-out stages.

10 January 2023 Round of 16	Osasuna	Void; ~~(0–9)~~	Barcelona	Pamplona
20:45 CET (UTC+1)		Report	~~Vilamala 22', 26', 55'~~; ~~Paralluelo 49', 57'~~; ~~Geyse 53'~~; ~~Aitana 67', 84'~~; ~~Caldentey 82'~~	Stadium: Estadio El Sadar; Attendance: 6,167; Referee: Marta Frías Acedo
Note: The result was void and Barcelona eliminated for fielding an ineligible player.

=== Supercopa de España Femenina ===
The draw for the semi-finals was held on 21 December 2022 in Mérida. Barcelona started their Supercopa defense against Real Madrid on 19 January 2023, in the second Women's Clásico of the season, where they won 3–1 after extra-time and advanced to the final. In the final they defeated Real Sociedad 3–0, winning the Supercopa for a record third time.

19 January 2023 Semi-final	Barcelona	3–1 (a.e.t.)	Real Madrid	Mérida
18:30 CET (UTC+1)	Paredes (yellow card) 16' (yellow-red card) 59'; Pina 24'; Bronze (yellow card) 68'; Caldentey 111' (pen.); Paralluelo 120'	Report	Weir 54'; Zornoza (yellow card) 66'; Abelleira (yellow card) 110'	Stadium: Estadio Romano; Attendance: 6,209; Referee: Marta Huerta de Aza

22 January 2023 Final	Real Sociedad	0–3	Barcelona	Mérida
12:00 CET (UTC+1)		Report	Aitana 13', 47'; Paralluelo (yellow card) 41'; Oshoala 90+7'	Stadium: Estadio Romano; Attendance: 6,339; Referee: Marta Frías Acedo; MVP: Aitana Bonmatí

=== UEFA Women's Champions League ===
==== Group stage ====
Pos	Team	Pld	W	D	L	GF	GA	GD	Pts	Qualification	BAR	MUN	BEN	ROS
1	(Spain) Barcelona	6	5	0	1	29	6	+23	15 (Note: Tied on head-to-head points. Head-to-head goal difference: Barcelona +1, Bayern Munich −1.)	Advance to Quarter-finals	—	3–0	9–0	6–0
2	(Germany) Bayern Munich	6	5	0	1	14	7	+7	15	Advance to Quarter-finals	3–1	—	2–0	2–1
3	(Portugal) Benfica	6	2	0	4	8	21	−13	6		2–6	2–3	—	1–0
4	(Sweden) Rosengård	6	0	0	6	3	20	−17	0		1–4	0–4	1–3	—

Source: UEFA
Rules for classification: Group stage tiebreakers
Notes:

19 October 2022 1	Barcelona (Spain)	9–0	(Portugal) Benfica	Sant Joan Despí, Spain
21:00 CEST (UTC+2)	Guijarro 1'; Bonmatí 14'; Mapi León (yellow card) 24'; Oshoala 34', 84'; Caldentey 50'; Rábano (yellow card) 54'; Crnogorčević 65'; Geyse 67', 88'; Pina 77'	Report	Norton (yellow card) 40'; Correia (yellow card) 78'; Costa (yellow card) 90+1'	Stadium: Estadi Johan Cruyff; Attendance: 5,004; Referee: Ionela Peșu (Romania)

27 October 2022 2	Rosengård (Sweden)	1–4	(Spain) Barcelona	Malmö, Sweden
18:45 CEST (UTC+2)	Holdt 45+2'; Wik (yellow card) 56'	Report	Bonmatí 30', 41'; Geyse (yellow card) 32'; Caldentey 65', 90+2'	Stadium: Malmö IP; Attendance: 4,812; Referee: Lorraine Watson (Scotland)

24 November 2022 3	Barcelona (Spain)	3–0	(Germany) Bayern Munich	Barcelona, Spain
18:45 CET (UTC+1)	Geyse 47'; Bonmatí 59'; Pina 66'	Report		Stadium: Camp Nou; Attendance: 46,967; Referee: Cheryl Foster (Wales)

7 December 2022 4	Bayern Munich (Germany)	3–1	(Spain) Barcelona	Munich, Germany
21:00 CET (UTC+1)	Bühl 4'; Magull 10'; Schüller 60'	Report	Geyse 65'; Bonmatí (yellow card) 77'	Stadium: Allianz Arena; Attendance: 24,000; Referee: Esther Staubli (Switzerland)

15 December 2022 5	Benfica (Portugal)	2–6	(Spain) Barcelona	Seixal, Portugal
21:00 CET (UTC+1)	Amado (yellow card) 61'; Silva 62'; Vitória (yellow card) 68', (penalty missed) 90+6'; Raysla (penalty missed) 73'; Lacasse 81'	Report	Paredes 7'; Pina 45+2'; Bonmatí 48'; Crnogorčević 58'; Seiça 80' (o.g.); Caldentey 90'	Stadium: Benfica Campus; Attendance: 850; Referee: Jelena Cvetković (Serbia)

21 December 2022 6	Barcelona (Spain)	6–0	(Sweden) Rosengård	Barcelona, Spain
21:00 CET (UTC+1)	Oshoala 10', 16'; Mapi León 45+3'; Rolfö 47'; Torrejón 50'; Paredes 69'	Report	Holdt (yellow card) 14'; Persson (yellow card) 45+1'	Stadium: Camp Nou; Attendance: 28,720; Referee: Désirée Grundbacher (Switzerland)

==== Knockout phase ====
===== Quarter-finals =====
21 March 2023 First leg	Roma (Italy)	0–1	(Spain) Barcelona	Rome
21:00 CET (UTC+1)	Giacinti (yellow card) 34'	Report	Paralluelo 34'; Paredes (yellow card) 37'; Bronze (yellow card) 81'	Stadium: Stadio Olimpico; Attendance: 39,454; Referee: Iuliana Demetrescu (Romania)

29 March 2023 Second leg	Barcelona (Spain)	5–1 (6–1 agg.)	(Italy) Roma	Barcelona
18:45 CEST (UTC+2)	Rolfö 11', 45+2'; Mapi León 33'; Oshoala 46', (yellow card) 63'; Guijarro 53'; Fernández (yellow card) 90+2'	Report	Serturini 58'	Stadium: Camp Nou; Attendance: 54,667; Referee: Riem Hussein (Germany)

===== Semi-finals =====
22 April 2023 First leg	Chelsea (England)	0–1	(Spain) Barcelona	Fulham
13:30 CEST (UTC+2)	Kerr (yellow card) 37'; James (yellow card) 71'	Report	Hansen 4'; Mapi León (yellow card) 41'; Walsh (yellow card) 63'; Paños (yellow card) 90+3'	Stadium: Stamford Bridge; Attendance: 27,697; Referee: Jana Adámková (Czech Republic)

27 April 2023 Second leg	Barcelona (Spain)	1–1 (2–1 agg.)	(England) Chelsea	Barcelona
18:45 CEST (UTC+2)	Hansen 63'	Report	Reiten (yellow card) 18', (goal) 67'; Cuthbert (yellow card) 90'	Stadium: Camp Nou; Attendance: 72,262; Referee: Esther Staubli (Switzerland)

===== Final =====
3 June 2023 Final	Barcelona (Spain)	3–2	(Germany) VfL Wolfsburg	Eindhoven
16:00 CEST (UTC+2)	Bonmatí (yellow card) 33'; Guijarro 48', 50'; Rolfö 70'; Paredes (yellow card) 90+4'	Report	Pajor 3'; Hendrich (yellow card) 22'; Popp 37', (yellow card) 90+4'; Jónsdóttir (yellow card) 77'	Stadium: Philips Stadion; Attendance: 33,147; Referee: Cheryl Foster (Wales); MVP: Patricia Guijarro

== Statistics ==
=== Overall ===
As of last matchday.

No..	Pos.	Nat.	Player	Liga F		Copa de la Reina		Supercopa de España		Champions League		Total		Discipline		Notes
No..	Pos.	Nat.	Player	Apps	Goals	Apps	Goals	Apps	Goals	Apps	Goals	Apps	Goals	Yellow card	Red card	Notes
Goalkeepers
1	GK	(Spain)	Sandra Paños	20	0	0	0	2	0	9	0	31	0	3	0	
13	GK	(Spain)	Cata Coll	2+1	0	0	0	0	0	0	0	3	0	0	0	
24	GK	(Spain)	Gemma Font	8	0	1	0	0	0	2	0	11	0	0	0	
36	GK	(Spain)	Meritxell Muñoz	0	0	0	0	0	0	0	0	0	0	0	0	
37	GK	(Spain)	Meritxell Font	0	0	0	0	0	0	0	0	0	0	0	0	
Defenders
2	DF	(Spain)	Irene Paredes	20+5	2	0	0	1	0	11	2	37	4	6	1	
3	DF	(Spain)	Laia Codina	8+5	1	1	0	0+1	0	0+2	0	17	1	2	0	
4	DF	(Spain)	María Pilar León	23+2	3	0	0	2	0	11	2	38	5	6	0	
5	DF	(Spain)	Jana Fernández	4+2	1	0	0	0	0	0+1	0	7	1	2	0	
7	DF	(Switzerland)	Ana-Maria Crnogorčević	17+12	8	0	0	1+1	0	4+5	2	40	10	2	0	
8	DF	(Spain)	Marta Torrejón	17+10	3	1	0	1+1	0	3+6	1	39	4	0	0	
15	DF	(England)	Lucy Bronze	14+6	3	0+1	0	2	0	8+1	0	32	3	2	0	
22	DF	(Spain)	Nuria Rábano	14+5	0	1	0	0+1	0	1+2	0	24	0	2	0	
25	DF	(Spain)	Emma Ramírez	1+5	0	0+1	0	0	0	0	0	7	0	0	0	
34	DF	(Spain)	Martina Fernández	1+2	0	0	0	0	0	0	0	3	0	1	0	
Midfielders
11	MF	(Spain)	Alexia Putellas	0+5	1	0	0	0	0	0+1	0	6	1	0	0	
12	MF	(Spain)	Patricia Guijarro	25+3	3	0	0	2	0	9+1	4	40	7	0	0	
14	MF	(Spain)	Aitana Bonmatí	18+5	10	1	2	2	2	11	5	37	19	3	0	
21	MF	(England)	Keira Walsh	18+8	1	1	0	2	0	9	0	38	1	1	0	
23	MF	(Norway)	Ingrid Engen	9+12	2	0	0	0	0	2+9	0	32	2	0	0	
27	MF	(Spain)	María Pérez	0+3	0	1	0	0	0	0+1	0	5	0	0	0	
28	MF	(Spain)	Alba Caño	0+1	0	0	0	0	0	0	0	1	0	0	0	
30	MF	(Spain)	Vicky López	5+5	2	1	0	0+1	0	0+1	0	13	2	0	0	
Forwards
6	FW	(Spain)	Clàudia Pina	17+5	10	0	0	1+1	1	3+4	3	31	14	1	0	
9	FW	(Spain)	Mariona Caldentey	12+7	6	0+1	1	1+1	1	6+2	4	30	12	3	0	
10	FW	(Norway)	Caroline Graham Hansen	8+5	11	0	0	0	0	6	2	19	13	2	0	
16	FW	(Sweden)	Fridolina Rolfö	19+2	8	0	0	2	0	9+1	4	33	12	2	0	
17	FW	(Spain)	Salma Paralluelo	9+9	11	1	2	1+1	1	4+4	1	29	15	1	0	
18	FW	(Brazil)	Geyse Ferreira	17+7	6	1	1	2	0	5+5	4	37	11	6	0	
19	FW	(Spain)	Bruna Vilamala	5+5	1	1	3	0	0	0+5	0	16	4	1	0	
20	FW	(Nigeria)	Asisat Oshoala	17+11	21	0+1	0	0+2	1	6+3	5	40	27	2	0	
32	FW	(Spain)	Ariana Arias	0+1	0	0	0	0	0	0	0	1	0	0	0	
33	FW	(Spain)	Ona Baradad	0	0	0+1	0	0	0	0	0	1	0	0	0	
40	FW	(Spain)	Lucía Corrales	1+1	0	0	0	0	0	0	0	2	0	0	0	
Own goals (1)

=== Goalscorers ===
As of last matchday.

Rank	No.	Pos.	Nat.	Player	Liga F	Copa de la Reina	Supercopa de España	Champions League	Total
1	20	FW	(Nigeria)	Asisat Oshoala	21	—	1	5	27
2	14	MF	(Spain)	Aitana Bonmatí	10	2	2	5	19
3	17	FW	(Spain)	Salma Paralluelo	11	2	1	1	15
4	6	FW	(Spain)	Clàudia Pina	10	—	1	3	14
5	10	FW	(Norway)	Caroline Graham Hansen	11	—	—	2	13
6	16	FW	(Sweden)	Fridolina Rolfö	8	—	—	4	12
6	9	FW	(Spain)	Mariona Caldentey	6	1	1	4	12
8	18	FW	(Brazil)	Geyse Ferreira	6	1	—	4	11
9	7	DF	(Switzerland)	Ana-Maria Crnogorčević	8	—	—	2	10
10	12	MF	(Spain)	Patricia Guijarro	3	—	—	4	7
11	4	DF	(Spain)	María Pilar León	3	—	—	2	5
12	8	DF	(Spain)	Marta Torrejón	3	—	—	1	4
12	2	DF	(Spain)	Irene Paredes	2	—	—	2	4
12	19	FW	(Spain)	Bruna Vilamala	1	3	—	—	4
15	15	DF	(England)	Lucy Bronze	3	—	—	—	3
16	23	MF	(Norway)	Ingrid Engen	2	—	—	—	2
16	30	MF	(Spain)	Vicky López	2	—	—	—	2
18	21	MF	(England)	Keira Walsh	1	—	—	—	1
18	3	DF	(Spain)	Laia Codina	1	—	—	—	1
18	5	DF	(Spain)	Jana Fernández	1	—	—	—	1
18	11	MF	(Spain)	Alexia Putellas	1	—	—	—	1
Own goals (from the opponents)					4	—	—	1	5
Totals					118	9	6	40	173

=== Hat-tricks ===
Player	Against	Minutes	Score after goals	Result	Date	Competition	Ref
(Spain) Bruna Vilamala	(Spain) Osasuna	22', 26', 55'	0–1, 0–2, 0–5	0–9 (A)	10 January 2023	Copa de la Reina	
(Nigeria) Asisat Oshoala	(Spain) Levante Las Planas	25', 56', 63'	2–0, 5–0, 6–0	7–0 (H)	25 January 2023	Liga F	
(Nigeria) Asisat Oshoala	(Spain) UD Granadilla Tenerife	8', 12', 27'	0–2, 0–3, 0–4	0–6 (A)	29 January 2023	Liga F	
(Nigeria) Asisat Oshoala	(Spain) Real Betis	61', 77', 90+2'	4–0, 6–0, 7–0	7–0 (H)	5 February 2023	Liga F	
(Norway) Caroline Graham Hansen	(Spain) Villarreal	70', 84', 90'	3–0, 4–0, 5–0	5–0 (H)	5 March 2023	Liga F	

(H) – Home; (A) – Away

=== Assists ===
As of last matchday.

Rank	No.	Pos.	Nat.	Player	Liga F	Copa de la Reina	Supercopa de España	Champions League	Total
1	14	MF	(Spain)	Aitana Bonmatí	10	2	1	8	21
2	9	FW	(Spain)	Mariona Caldentey	6	—	—	5	11
2	12	MF	(Spain)	Patricia Guijarro	8	—	—	2	10
2	16	FW	(Sweden)	Fridolina Rolfö	8	—	—	2	10
2	18	FW	(Brazil)	Geyse Ferreira	2	1	2	5	10
6	6	FW	(Spain)	Clàudia Pina	8	—	—	1	9
6	10	FW	(Norway)	Caroline Graham Hansen	6	—	—	3	9
8	7	DF	(Switzerland)	Ana-Maria Crnogorčević	7	—	—	1	8
9	20	FW	(Nigeria)	Asisat Oshoala	3	—	1	3	7
10	4	DF	(Spain)	María Pilar León	6	—	—	—	6
10	17	FW	(Spain)	Salma Paralluelo	4	1	—	1	6
12	22	DF	(Spain)	Nuria Rábano	4	—	—	—	4
12	15	DF	(England)	Lucy Bronze	2	—	1	1	4
14	8	DF	(Spain)	Marta Torrejón	2	—	—	—	2
14	19	FW	(Spain)	Bruna Vilamala	2	—	—	—	2
14	21	MF	(England)	Keira Walsh	—	—	—	2	2
17	2	DF	(Spain)	Irene Paredes	1	—	—	—	1
17	25	DF	(Spain)	Emma Ramírez	1	—	—	—	1
17	23	MF	(Norway)	Ingrid Engen	1	—	—	—	1
17	5	DF	(Spain)	Jana Fernández	1	—	—	—	1
17	30	MF	(Spain)	Vicky López	—	1	—	—	1
Totals					82	5	5	34	126

=== Hat-trick of assists ===
Player	Against	Minutes	Score after assists	Result	Date	Competition	Ref
(Sweden) Fridolina Rolfö	(Spain) Real Betis	48', 61', 77'	3–0, 4–0, 6–0	7–0 (H)	5 February 2023	Liga F	
(Spain) Aitana Bonmatí	(Spain) Villarreal	38', 70', 84'	2–0, 3–0, 4–0	5–0 (H)	5 March 2023	Liga F	
(Spain) Aitana Bonmatí	(Spain) Valencia	45+2', 60', 66'	2–1, 3–1, 4–1	5–1 (H)	17 March 2023	Liga F	

(H) – Home; (A) – Away

=== Cleansheets ===
As of last matchday.

Rank	No.	Nat.	Player	Liga F	Copa de la Reina	Supercopa de España	Champions League	Total
1	1	(Spain)	Sandra Paños	13	—	1	3	17
2	24	(Spain)	Gemma Font	7	1	—	2	10
3	13	(Spain)	Cata Coll	3	—	—	—	3
4	36	(Spain)	Meritxell Muñoz	—	—	—	—	—
4	37	(Spain)	Meritxell Font	—	—	—	—	—
Totals				23	1	1	5	30

=== Disciplinary record ===
As of last matchday.

No.	Pos.	Nat.	Player	Liga F			Copa de la Reina			Supercopa de España			Champions League			Total		
No.	Pos.	Nat.	Player	Yellow card	(yellow card) (yellow-red card)	Red card	Yellow card	(yellow card) (yellow-red card)	Red card	Yellow card	(yellow card) (yellow-red card)	Red card	Yellow card	(yellow card) (yellow-red card)	Red card	Yellow card	(yellow card) (yellow-red card)	Red card
2	DF	(Spain)	Irene Paredes	2						2	1		2			6	1	
18	FW	(Brazil)	Geyse Ferreira	5									1			6		
4	DF	(Spain)	María Pilar León	4									2			6		
1	GK	(Spain)	Sandra Paños	2									1			3		
9	FW	(Spain)	Mariona Caldentey	3												3		
14	MF	(Spain)	Aitana Bonmatí	1									2			3		
10	FW	(Norway)	Caroline Graham Hansen	2												2		
16	FW	(Sweden)	Fridolina Rolfö	2												2		
3	DF	(Spain)	Laia Codina	2												2		
7	DF	(Switzerland)	Ana-Maria Crnogorčević	2												2		
22	DF	(Spain)	Nuria Rábano	1									1			2		
20	FW	(Nigeria)	Asisat Oshoala	1									1			2		
5	DF	(Spain)	Jana Fernández	1									1			2		
15	DF	(England)	Lucy Bronze							1			1			2		
19	FW	(Spain)	Bruna Vilamala	1												1		
34	DF	(Spain)	Martina Fernández	1												1		
6	FW	(Spain)	Clàudia Pina	1												1		
17	FW	(Spain)	Salma Paralluelo							1						1		
21	MF	(England)	Keira Walsh										1			1		
Coach		(Spain)	Jonatan Giráldez										1			1		
Totals				31						4	1		14			49	1	

Source: FCBarcelona.com
Ordered by (red card) , (second yellow card) and (yellow card)
(yellow card) = Number of bookings; (second yellow card) = Number of sending offs after a second yellow card; (red card) = Number of sending offs by a direct red card.

=== Injury record ===
No.	Pos.	Nat.	Name	Type	Status	Source	Match	Inj. Date	Ret. Date
19	FW	(Spain)	Bruna Vilamala	Anterior cruciate ligament injury – right knee		Barça Buzz	vs Portugal with Spain	25 October 2021	18 November 2022
5	DF	(Spain)	Jana Fernández	Anterior cruciate ligament injury – right knee		FCB.com	in training	14 February 2022	28 February 2023
13	GK	(Spain)	Cata Coll	Anterior cruciate ligament injury – left knee		Sport	in training	22 February 2022	3 March 2023
11	MF	(Spain)	Alexia Putellas	Anterior cruciate ligament injury – left knee		FCB.com	in training	5 July 2022	26 April 2023
20	FW	(Nigeria)	Asisat Oshoala	Medial collateral ligament injury		BBC	vs South Africa with Nigeria	6 July 2022	8 September 2022
22	DF	(Spain)	Nuria Rábano	Ankle sprain		Diario AS	in training	3 August 2022	8 September 2022
14	MF	(Spain)	Aitana Bonmatí	Calf strain – right calf		FCB.com	in training	10 August 2022	15 September 2022
3	DF	(Spain)	Laia Codina	Thigh strain – right thigh		Sport	in training	15 August 2022	8 September 2022
10	FW	(Norway)	Caroline Graham Hansen	Minor knee injury		FCB Twitter	vs Montpellier	23 August 2022	25 August 2022
23	MF	(Norway)	Ingrid Engen	Concussion		FCB Twitter	vs Montpellier	23 August 2022	28 August 2022
8	DF	(Spain)	Marta Torrejón	Thigh strain – right thigh		FCB Twitter	in training	25 August 2022	9 September 2022
4	DF	(Spain)	María Pilar León	Cervical strain		SEFF Twitter	in training	28 August 2022	9 September 2022
17	FW	(Spain)	Salma Paralluelo	Thigh strain – right thigh		FCB Twitter; FCB Twitter	in training	16 September 2022	24 September 2022
6	FW	(Spain)	Clàudia Pina	Lumbar strain		FCB Twitter; FCB Twitter	in training	16 September 2022	24 September 2022
14	MF	(Spain)	Aitana Bonmatí	Thigh strain – right thigh		FCB.com	in training	20 September 2022	15 October 2022
25	DF	(Spain)	Emma Ramírez	Thigh strain – right thigh		FCB Twitter	in training	24 September 2022	23 November 2022
1	GK	(Spain)	Sandra Paños	Ankle sprain – left ankle		FCB Twitter	in training	30 September 2022	21 October 2022
17	FW	(Spain)	Salma Paralluelo	Thigh strain – right thigh		FCB Twitter	in training	30 September 2022	25 October 2022
3	DF	(Spain)	Laia Codina	Separated shoulder – right shoulder		FCB.com	vs Benfica	19 October 2022	19 November 2022
10	FW	(Norway)	Caroline Graham Hansen	Pulled hamstring – right thigh		FCB.com	vs Rosengård	27 October 2022	2 March 2023
9	FW	(Spain)	Mariona Caldentey	Pulled hamstring – right thigh		FCB Twitter	in training	2 November 2022	26 November 2022
15	DF	(England)	Lucy Bronze	Knee injury (Note: Later explained to be a flare-up from Bronze's long-standing knee injury.)		Mundo Deportivo	with England	11 November 2022	23 November 2022
14	MF	(Spain)	Aitana Bonmatí	Muscle injury		FCB Twitter	in training	19 November 2022	23 November 2022
25	DF	(Spain)	Emma Ramírez	Leg injury – right leg		FCB Twitter	in training	20 December 2022	4 January 2023
23	MF	(Norway)	Ingrid Engen	Rectus femoris muscle injury – right leg		FCB Twitter	vs Sevilla	7 January 2023	1 March 2023
19	FW	(Spain)	Bruna Vilamala	Quadriceps injury – left leg		FCB Twitter	in training	13 January 2023	4 February 2023
21	MF	(England)	Keira Walsh	Thigh injury – left thigh (Note: Reported as a "technical decision", Barça TV said that Walsh was not given clearance only as a precaution. She had played another match with the injury before being rested, not being called up for the match on 25 January 2023.)		Soccerway	vs Real Madrid	19 January 2023	29 January 2023
17	FW	(Spain)	Salma Paralluelo	Thigh strain – left thigh		FCB Twitter	in training	25 January 2023	4 February 2023
9	FW	(Spain)	Mariona Caldentey	Thigh strain – left thigh		FCB Twitter	in training	10 February 2023	14 April 2023
9	FW	(Spain)	Mariona Caldentey	Biceps femoris injury – left thigh		FCB Twitter	in training	24 February 2023	14 April 2023
6	FW	(Spain)	Clàudia Pina	Ankle sprain – right ankle		FCB Twitter	in training	16 March 2023	20 April 2023
10	FW	(Norway)	Caroline Graham Hansen	Patellar tendon discomfort – left knee		Fotball.no	vs Alhama	2 April 2023	14 April 2023
20	FW	(Nigeria)	Asisat Oshoala	Discomfort – left groin		FCB Twitter	in training	14 April 2023	20 April 2023
15	DF	(England)	Lucy Bronze	Knee strain – right knee		Sky Sports	vs Chelsea	22 April 2023	1 June 2023
16	FW	(Sweden)	Fridolina Rolfö	Discomfort – right knee		FCB Twitter	in training	29 April 2023	1 June 2023
20	FW	(Nigeria)	Asisat Oshoala	Hamstring injury – left thigh		FCB Twitter	in training	3 June 2023	21 July 2023

- Player is injured
- Player has recovered from injury
Source: FC Barcelona

== Awards ==
Name	Position	Award	Ref.
(Nigeria) Asisat Oshoala	Forward	African Women's Footballer of the Year (2022) (5th award – record)	
(Spain) Aitana Bonmatí	Midfielder	UEFA Women's Euro 2022 Team of the Tournament	
(Spain) Aitana Bonmatí	Midfielder	UEFA Women's Euro 2022 Top Ten Goals of the Tournament – #5	
(Spain) Alexia Putellas	Midfielder	UEFA Women's Player of the Year Award (2021–22) (2nd award – shared record)	
(Spain) Alexia Putellas	Midfielder	Ballon d'Or (2021–22) (2nd award – record)	
(Spain) Alexia Putellas	Midfielder	Golden Woman (2022) (1st award – shared record)	
(Nigeria) Asisat Oshoala	Forward	UEFA Women's Champions League Goal of the Week – Matchday 1 (vs Benfica)	
(Spain) Alexia Putellas	Midfielder	Gala de Fútbol Femenino (2022) – MVP	
(Spain) Clàudia Pina	Forward	Gala de Fútbol Femenino (2022) – International Impact Trophy	
(Spain) Júlia Bartel	Midfielder	Gala de Fútbol Femenino (2022) – Promise Trophy	
(Spain) Salma Paralluelo	Forward	Gala de Fútbol Femenino (2022) – Best Goal	
FC Barcelona		Gala de Fútbol Femenino (2022) – Extraordinary Award: Record Attendance	
(Spain) Mariona Caldentey	Forward	UEFA Women's Champions League Goal of the Week – Matchday 2 (vs Rosengård)	
(Spain) Vicky López	Midfielder	Golden Ball (2022 FIFA U-17 Women's World Cup) (1st award – shared record)	
(Spain) Alexia Putellas	Midfielder	Golsmedia FutbolFest Awards (2022) – Best Player of the Liga Iberdrola (2021–22)	
(Spain) Sandra Paños	Goalkeeper	Golsmedia FutbolFest Awards (2022) – Best Goalkeeper of the Liga Iberdrola (2021–22)	
FC Barcelona		Golsmedia FutbolFest Awards (2022) – SuperCampeonas 2022 Award: Best Women's Football Club (2021–22)	
(Spain) Alexia Putellas	Midfielder	Globe Soccer Awards – Best Women's Player of the Year (2022) (2nd award – record)	
(Spain) Alexia Putellas	Midfielder	Catalan Football Stars Gala (2022) – Best Women's Catalan Player of the Year (2021–22) (4th award – record)	
(Spain) Alexia Putellas	Midfielder	Catalan Football Stars Gala (2022) – Top scorer of the Year (2021–22) (18 goals)	
(Spain) Clàudia Pina	Forward	Catalan Football Stars Gala (2022) – Most Promising Player (2021–22) (1st award)	
(Spain) Alexia Putellas	Midfielder	UEFA Women's Champions League Player of the Season: 2021–22 (1st award)	
(Spain) Clàudia Pina	Forward	UEFA Women's Champions League Goal of the Week – Matchday 3 (vs Bayern Munich)	
(Spain) Alexia Putellas	Midfielder	IFFHS Women's World Best Player (2022) (2nd award – record)	
(Spain) Alexia Putellas	Midfielder	IFFHS Women's World Best Playmaker (2022) (2nd award)	
(Spain) Clàudia Pina	Forward	UEFA Women's Champions League Goal of the Week – Matchday 5 (vs Benfica)	
(Spain) Alexia Putellas	Midfielder	Marca Women's Sports Awards Gala (2021–22) – MVP	
(Nigeria) Asisat Oshoala	Forward	Marca Women's Sports Awards Gala (2021–22) – Pichichi Trophy (shared with Geyse Ferreira)	
(Spain) Salma Paralluelo	Forward	Marca Women's Sports Awards Gala (2021–22) – Goal of the Year	
(Spain) Jonatan Giráldez	Coach	Marca Women's Sports Awards Gala (2021–22) – Best Coach	
(Spain) Alexia Putellas	Midfielder	GOAL50 – Women's Player of the Year (2022) (2nd award – record)	
(Sweden) Fridolina Rolfö	Forward	UEFA Women's Champions League Goal of the Week – Matchday 6 (vs Rosengård)	
(Spain) Alexia Putellas	Midfielder	The 10 Best Female Footballers in the World 2022 – #1 (2nd #1 appearance – shared record)	
(Spain) Aitana Bonmatí	Midfielder	The 10 Best Female Footballers in the World 2022 – #4	
(Norway) Caroline Graham Hansen	Forward	The 10 Best Female Footballers in the World 2022 – #8	
(England) Keira Walsh	Midfielder	The 10 Best Female Footballers in the World 2022 – #9	
(England) Lucy Bronze	Defender	The 10 Best Female Footballers in the World 2022 – #10 (6th top 10 appearance – shared record)	
(Sweden) Fridolina Rolfö	Forward	Fotbollsgalan – Swedish Forward of the Year (2022) (3rd award)	
(Sweden) Fridolina Rolfö	Forward	Diamond Ball – Best Swedish Female Player of the Year (2022) (2nd award)	
(Spain) Alexia Putellas	Midfielder	International Sports Press Association (AIPS) – Best Female Athlete of the Year (2022) (1st award)	
(Spain) Clàudia Pina	Forward	UEFA Women's Champions League Goal of the Group Stage (vs Bayern Munich – Matchday 3)	
FC Barcelona		IFFHS Women's World's Best Club (2022) (2nd award)	
FC Barcelona		IFFHS Women's UEFA Best Club (2022)	
(Nigeria) Asisat Oshoala	Forward	IFFHS Women's World Best Goalscorer January 2023	
FC Barcelona		Panenka Premi Antonín del Año (2022) – Cultural values in Spanish football	
FC Barcelona (club)		Premi Enderrock Estrella (2023) – Promotion of Catalan music	
(Spain) Alexia Putellas	Midfielder	Mundo Deportivo Grand Gala – Female athlete of the Year (2022)	
(Spain) Alexia Putellas	Midfielder	Trofeo Aldo Rovira (2021–22) (2nd award – record)	
(Spain) Sandra Paños	Goalkeeper	FIFA FIFPRO Women's World 11 "World Squad" (2022)	
(England) Lucy Bronze	Defender	FIFA FIFPRO Women's World 11 "World Squad" (2022)	
(Spain) Mapi León	Defender	FIFA FIFPRO Women's World 11 "World Squad" (2022)	
(Spain) Irene Paredes	Defender	FIFA FIFPRO Women's World 11 "World Squad" (2022)	
(Spain) Aitana Bonmatí	Midfielder	FIFA FIFPRO Women's World 11 "World Squad" (2022)	
(Norway) Caroline Graham Hansen	Forward (Note: Included as a midfielder)	FIFA FIFPRO Women's World 11 "World Squad" (2022)	
(Spain) Alexia Putellas	Midfielder	FIFA FIFPRO Women's World 11 "World Squad" (2022)	
(England) Keira Walsh	Midfielder	FIFA FIFPRO Women's World 11 "World Squad" (2022)	
(Spain) Aitana Bonmatí	Midfielder	Barça Players Award (2021–22) (2nd award – record)	
(England) Lucy Bronze	Defender	FIFA FIFPRO Women's World 11 (2022) (5th appearance)	
(Spain) Mapi León	Defender	FIFA FIFPRO Women's World 11 (2022) (1st appearance)	
(Spain) Alexia Putellas	Midfielder	FIFA FIFPRO Women's World 11 (2022) (1st appearance)	
(England) Keira Walsh	Midfielder	FIFA FIFPRO Women's World 11 (2022) (1st appearance)	
(Spain) Alexia Putellas	Midfielder	The Best FIFA Women's Player (2022) (2nd award – record)	
(Spain) Mapi León	Defender	UEFA Women's Champions League Goal of the Week – Quarter-finals – 2nd leg (vs Roma)	
(Spain) Alexia Putellas	Midfielder	Premio Reina Letizia (2021)	
(Norway) Caroline Graham Hansen	Forward	UEFA Women's Champions League Goal of the Week – Semi-finals – 1st leg (vs Chelsea)	
(Norway) Caroline Graham Hansen	Forward	UEFA Women's Champions League Goal of the Week – Semi-finals – 2nd leg (vs Chelsea)	
(England) Keira Walsh	Midfielder	Women's Football Awards International Player of the Year (2022) (1st award – record)	
FC Barcelona		Premio Culer Femenino	
(Spain) Aitana Bonmatí	Midfielder	UEFA Women's Champions League Player of the Season 2022–23 (1st award – shared record)	
(Spain) Aitana Bonmatí	Midfielder	UEFA Women's Champions League Team of the Season 2022–23	
(England) Lucy Bronze	Defender	UEFA Women's Champions League Team of the Season 2022–23	
(Spain) Irene Paredes	Defender	UEFA Women's Champions League Team of the Season 2022–23	
(Spain) Mapi León	Defender	UEFA Women's Champions League Team of the Season 2022–23	
(Spain) Patri Guijarro	Midfielder	UEFA Women's Champions League Team of the Season 2022–23	
(Norway) Caroline Graham Hansen	Forward	UEFA Women's Champions League Team of the Season 2022–23	
(Spain) Aitana Bonmatí	Midfielder	Trofeo Aldo Rovira (2022–23)	
