= Martina Fernández =

Spanish footballer (born 2004)

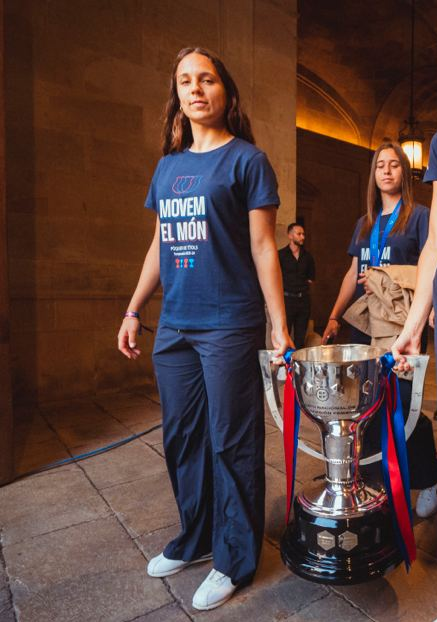
- Fernández with the Liga F trophy in May 2024

Personal information
- Full name: Martina Fernández Vila
- Date of birth: 1 October 2004 (age 22)
- Place of birth: Ordis, Catalonia
- Position: Defender

Team information
- Current team: Barcelona
- Number: 24

Youth career
- 2014–2016: Borrassà
- 2018–2022: Barcelona

Senior career*
Years	Team	Apps	(Gls)
2016–2018	Girona B		
2020–2024	Barcelona B	83	(7)
2022–2025	Barcelona	21	(1)
2025	→ Everton (loan)	12	(0)
2025–2026	Everton	22	(2)
2026–	Barcelona	0	(0)

International career^{‡}
2020	Spain U16	1	(0)
2021–2023	Spain U19	24	(4)
2023–	Spain U23	4	(0)
2024	Spain U20	2	(0)
- * Club domestic league appearances and goals as of 14:44, 19 May 2026 (UTC) ‡ National team caps and goals as of 23:11, 24 October 2024 (UTC)

Martina Fernández Vila (Spanish: [maɾˈtina feɾˈnandeθ ˈβila]; born 1 October 2004) is a Spanish professional footballer who plays as a defender for Liga F club Barcelona and the Spain under-23 national team.

With Barcelona, Fernández has won the Spanish league multiple times, including as part of their continental quadruple in 2023–24.

== Early and personal life ==
Martina Fernández Vila was born on 1 October 2004 and is from Ordis in the Province of Girona, Catalonia. She grew up near to her maternal grandparents, with whom she maintains a close relationship.

She began studying biomedicine but, in 2023, stopped pursuing this as a career to focus on football. As of 2024, she continues part-time study at a biomedical laboratory.

== Club career ==
=== Borrassà and Girona ===
Fernández' first sport was tennis, but she told her mother that she preferred football; her mother looked for ways to enable this and went to the football club in the next town, Borrassà. Though the girls' team was fully subscribed, the coach allowed Fernández to take part in a trial session with the boys' team at her mother's insistence: after three sessions, the coach promised to sign her. She spent three years at Borrassà before signing for Girona FC Femení B.

At Girona, she played with the second team (considered its youth cadet team, generally 19-year-olds) from the start, rather than age group teams, staying for two seasons.

=== Barcelona ===
==== Youth ====
Fernández joined Barcelona in the women's youth section in 2018. In her first year with the club she stayed with her family in the province of Girona, over 150 kilometres (93 miles) from Barcelona, and travelled with other players to train. Often ignoring the toll this took, her family then asked that she be supported to live at a school in Barcelona; after half a season of this situation, the COVID-19 pandemic forced her back to Ordís. Fernández moved back to Barcelona later in the year with her older sister. When the club opened Oriol Tort Training Centre, including a girls' student dormitory as part of La Masia, in 2021, one of the nine places was given to Fernández.

==== 2022–2024 ====
She played her first official match for the first team in February 2022, becoming one of the youngest debutants in the senior squad. She made five appearances in the league and Copa de la Reina in the 2021–22 and 2022–23 seasons. She then had a larger role in the 2023–24 season, due to a large number of injuries to the squad's first team defenders, establishing herself as a central defender. She made her UEFA Women's Champions League debut on 13 December 2023 against Rosengård, and scored her first goal for Barcelona in the 92nd minute of this game.

Fernández was fully promoted to the first team ahead of the 2024–25 season, but experienced injury and spent the first half of the season recovering from knee surgery. Having made two appearances for the team, Fernández won the 2024–25 Liga F when Barcelona were confirmed as champions in May 2025.

=== Everton ===
Wanting to maintain the regular first team playing experience she had in the previous season, Barcelona and Fernández looked for a loan opportunity once she was fully recovered. On 4 January 2025, Fernández was announced at Everton on a loan deal until the end of the season. From her arrival, she played every minute for Everton, starting and completing all matches as their primary centre-back. Everton finished the season eighth place in the Women's Super League, in a tight mid-table; Fernández ranked well among all the league's defenders and was named the team's Young Player of the Season.

On 18 July 2025, Fernández returned to Everton on a permanent basis for an undisclosed fee. She scored her first two goals for the club against Aston Villa on 1 February 2026, helping Everton to their first home win of the 2025-26 season.

=== Barcelona ===
On 26 July 2026, after a season and an half spent in England, it was announced she would return to Barcelona.

== International career ==
Fernández was first called up to the Spain under-19 squad in October 2021, for European matches, but did not make the final travelling squad. On 9 November 2022 she scored the opening goal in Spain's 3–0 defeat of Czech Republic at Pinatar Arena. In 2022, she won the Under-19 Euro title, and helped Spain defend it when they won again in the 2023 Under-19 Euro. She played the whole 120 minutes of the final that was eventually decided on penalties.

On 30 November 2023, Fernández debuted with the under-23 team, starting and playing the full match in a friendly against Sweden.

== Career statistics ==
=== Club ===
As of match played 16 May 2026

Appearances and goals by club, season and competition
Club	Season	League			National cup		League cup		Supercup		UWCL		Total	
Club	Season	Division	Apps	Goals	Apps	Goals	Apps	Goals	Apps	Goals	Apps	Goals	Apps	Goals
Barcelona	2021–22	Primera División	1	0	1	0	—		0	0	0	0	2	0
Barcelona	2022–23	Liga F	3	0	0	0	—		0	0	0	0	3	0
Barcelona	2023–24	Liga F	15	1	1	0	—		2	0	4	1	22	2
Barcelona	2024–25	Liga F	2	0	0	0	—		0	0	0	0	2	0
Barcelona			21	1	2	0	—		2	0	4	1	29	2
Everton (loan)	2024–25	Women's Super League	12	0	2	0	0	0	—		—		14	0
Everton	2025–26	Women's Super League	22	2	2	0	3	0	—		—		27	2
Career total			55	3	6	0	3	0	2	0	4	1	70	2

== Honours ==
Barcelona

- Primera División: 2021–22, 2022–23, 2023–24, 2024–25
- Copa de la Reina: 2021–22, 2023–24, 2024–25
- Supercopa de España: 2023–24
- UEFA Women's Champions League: 2023–24

Spain under-19

- UEFA Women's Under-19 Championship: 2022, 2023

Individual

- Everton F.C. Women Young Player of the Season: 2024–25
