= 2022–23 Supercopa de España Femenina =

2022–23 Supercopa de España
Spanish Women's Super Cup

Tournament details
- Host country: Spain
- City: Mérida
- Dates: 18–22 January 2023
- Teams: 4

Final positions
- Champions: Barcelona (3rd title)
- Runners-up: Real Sociedad

Tournament statistics
- Matches played: 3
- Goals scored: 8 (2.67 per match)
- Attendance: 13,548 (4,516 per match)
- Top scorer: Aitana Bonmatí (2 goals)

The 2022–23 Supercopa de España Femenina was the fourth edition of the current Supercopa de España Femenina, an annual women's football competition for clubs in the Spanish football league system that were successful in its major competitions in the preceding season.

Barcelona defended the title after defeating Real Sociedad 3–0 in the final, to win the competition for a record third time.

== Draw ==
The draw for the competition was held on 21 December 2022. On 15 January, the referees María Dolores Martínez Madrona and Marta Huerta de Aza were chosen to officiate in the semi-finals. The final took place at Estadio Romano in Mérida on 22 January 2023, and was officiated by referee Marta Frías Acedo.

== Qualification ==
The competition featured both finalists of the 2021–22 Copa de la Reina, as well as the next two highest-ranked clubs at the 2021–22 Primera División that had not already qualified through the cup final.

=== Qualified teams ===
The following four teams qualified for the tournament.

Team	Method of qualification
Barcelona	2021–22 Primera División and 2021–22 Copa de la Reina winner
Sporting de Huelva	2021–22 Copa de la Reina finalist
Real Sociedad	2021–22 Primera División runner-up
Real Madrid	2021–22 Primera División third

== Matches ==
=== Bracket ===
Semi-finals
18 January 2023
Real Sociedad	1
Sporting de Huelva	0
19 January 2023
Barcelona	3
Real Madrid	1

Final
22 January 2023
Real Sociedad	0
Barcelona	3

=== Semi-finals ===
18 January 2023
18:30

Real Sociedad	1–0	Sporting de Huelva
Bernabé 64'	Report

Estadio Romano, Mérida
Attendance: 1,000
Referee: María Dolores Martínez Madrona (Murcia)

19 January 2023
18:30

Barcelona	3–1	Real Madrid
Pina 24'; Caldentey 111' (pen.); Paralluelo 120'	Report	Weir 54'

Estadio Romano, Mérida
Attendance: 6,209
Referee: Marta Huerta de Aza (Tenerife)

=== Final ===
22 January 2023
12:00

Real Sociedad	0–3	Barcelona
	Report	Bonmatí 13', 47'; Oshoala 90+7'

Estadio Romano, Mérida
Attendance: 6,339
Referee: Marta Frías Acedo (Aragón)

Real Sociedad	Barcelona

GK	13	(Spain) Elene Lete
DF	3	(Spain) Ana Tejada
DF	12	(France) Jade Le Guilly
DF	22	(Colombia) Manuela Vanegas
DF	23	(Spain) Alejandra Bernabé
MF	8	(Spain) Iris Arnaiz
MF	10	(Spain) Nerea Eizagirre
MF	21	(Spain) Gemma Gili
FW	7	(Spain) Amaiur Sarriegi	(substituted off) 68'
FW	20	(Norway) Synne Jensen	(substituted off) 58'
FW	16	(Venezuela) Gaby García	(substituted off) 68'
Substitutes:
GK	1	(Spain) Adriana Nanclares
DF	2	(Spain) Iraia Iparragirre
DF	5	(Spain) Maddi Torre
DF	6	(Spain) Ane Etxezarreta
MF	14	(Spain) Izarne Sarasola
MF	19	(Portugal) Andreia Jacinto	(substituted on) 68'
FW	9	(Finland) Sanni Franssi	(substituted on) 58'
FW	17	(Serbia) Allegra Poljak
FW	18	(Spain) Mirari Uria	(substituted on) 68'
Manager:
(Spain) Natalia Arroyo

GK	1	(Spain) Sandra Paños
DF	4	(Spain) Mapi León
DF	8	(Spain) Marta Torrejón		(substituted off) 89'
DF	15	(England) Lucy Bronze
DF	16	(Sweden) Fridolina Rolfö
MF	12	(Spain) Patricia Guijarro
MF	14	(Spain) Aitana Bonmatí
MF	21	(England) Keira Walsh		(substituted off) 68'
FW	9	(Spain) Mariona Caldentey		(substituted off) 89'
FW	17	(Spain) Salma Paralluelo	(yellow card) 41'	(substituted off) 61'
FW	18	(Brazil) Geyse Ferreira		(substituted off) 61'
Substitutes:
GK	24	(Spain) Gemma Font
GK	37	(Spain) Meritxell Font
DF	3	(Spain) Laia Codina		(substituted on) 89'
DF	7	(Switzerland) Ana-Maria Crnogorčević		(substituted on) 61'
DF	22	(Spain) Nuria Rábano
DF	25	(Spain) Emma Ramírez
MF	27	(Spain) María Pérez
MF	30	(Spain) Vicky López		(substituted on) 89'
FW	6	(Spain) Clàudia Pina		(substituted on) 68'
FW	20	(Nigeria) Asisat Oshoala		(substituted on) 61'
Manager:
(Spain) Jonatan Giráldez

MVP: Aitana Bonmatí

== See also ==
- 2022–23 Liga F
- 2022–23 Copa de la Reina
