= Girona FC Femení B =

Spanish football team

Girona FC Femení
- Full name: Girona Futbol Club Femení
- Founded: July 2017; 8 years ago (refoundation)
- Ground: Torres de Palau Municipal; Girona
- Capacity: 500
- Owner(s): City Football Group (44.3%); Girona Football Group (44.3%)
- Chairman: Joan Carles Sánchez
- Manager: Marc Quer Barba
- League: Primera Catalana Group 2
- 2018–19: 2nd, Segona Catalana Group 4 (promoted)
Home colours	Away colours

Girona FC Femení is a football team from Girona, the women's section of Girona FC. The senior team was refounded in 2017 after a period of four years in which Girona were only by female teams at represented at youth level.

== History ==
Although Girona FC operated a senior women's team for a number of years, financial constraints had forced them to resign to its place in Segunda División in 2013 and to cease operations in 2016. In 2017 the Catalan club operated just 3 junior teams with a total of 41 youth players in their system. The announcement came less than two months before Girona itself was acquired by a consortium including City Football Group, a worldwide football organisation known for its support of women's football, though an explicit link between the two events was never made. The club also announced a simultaneous expansion of the female youth section.

Girona FC Femení came back to the competition in 2017–18, in the second division of the Catalan regional leagues, the fifth tier of women's football in Spain, where they finished second to narrowly miss out on promotion which the club had initially announced was their immediate goal. In 2018–19 they again finished second, but were still promoted to the Primera Catalana.

== Season to season ==
Season	Tier	Division	Place
2003–04	2	1ª Nacional	4th
2004–05	2	1ª Nacional	5th
2005–06	2	1ª Nacional	6th
2006–07	2	1ª Nacional	4th
2007–08	2	1ª Nacional	7th
2008–09	2	1ª Nacional	4th
2009–10	2	1ª Nacional	4th
2010–11	2	1ª Nacional	2nd
2011–12	2	2ª	3rd
2012–13	2	2ª	1st (Note: Resigned to continue in Segunda División due to financial constraints.)
2013–14	4	1ª Catalana	6th
2014–15	4	1ª Catalana	3rd
2015–16	4	1ª Catalana	4th
2016–17	Did not play		
2017–18	5	2ª Catalana	2nd
2018–19	5	2ª Catalana	2nd
