= Lara Mata =

Spanish footballer (born 1993)

Personal information
- Full name: Lara Mata Caudevilla
- Date of birth: 18 February 1993 (age 33)
- Place of birth: Zaragoza, Spain
- Height: 1.60 m (5 ft 3 in)
- Position: Defender

Senior career*
| Years | Team | Apps | (Gls) |
| 2008–2009 | Aragonesa | | |
| 2009–2018 | Zaragoza CFF | 189 | (3) |
| 2018–2023 | Villarreal | 96 | (5) |
- * Club domestic league appearances and goals as of 12:41, 13 December 2021 (UTC)

Lara Mata Caudevilla (born 18 February 1993) is a retired Spanish footballer who played as a defender for Zaragoza CFF and Villarreal.

== Club career ==
Mata started her career at Aragonesa.

In May 2023, Mata retired from football.
