= The 100 Best Female Footballers in the World =

Annual global ranking of the best female footballers

The 100 Best Female Footballers in the World is an annual global ranking of the best female footballers. The list was started by The Offside Rule podcast in 2016. Since 2018 it has also been published in association with the British newspaper The Guardian who have published the male equivalent since its inception in 2012.

The list is voted for by a panel of experts ranging from players and coaches to journalists and broadcasters from around the world. Judges are sent a longlist of 450 footballers and asked to rank their top 40 who are given a corresponding points value. The total across all judges determines the finish position. In 2019, the panel consisted of 93 judges from 44 countries across five continents including newly-appointed USWNT and reigning NWSL champion head coach Vlatko Andonovski, and FIFA Female Player of the Century and legendary China international Sun Wen.

== Winners ==
Number of wins in brackets.

Year	Player	Club(s)
2016	(Norway) Ada Hegerberg	(France) Lyon
2017	(Netherlands) Lieke Martens	(Sweden) Rosengård / (Spain) Barcelona
2018	(Denmark) Pernille Harder	(Germany) Wolfsburg
2019	(Australia) Sam Kerr	(Australia) Perth Glory / (United States) Chicago Red Stars
2020	(Denmark) Pernille Harder (2)	(Germany) Wolfsburg / (England) Chelsea
2021	(Spain) Alexia Putellas	(Spain) Barcelona
2022	(Spain) Alexia Putellas (2)	(Spain) Barcelona
2023	(Spain) Aitana Bonmatí	(Spain) Barcelona
2024	(Spain) Aitana Bonmatí	(Spain) Barcelona
2025	(Spain) Aitana Bonmatí (3)	(Spain) Barcelona

== Top 10 ==
As of 2025, 51 individual players have been included in the "top 10" of the Top 100 list.

Rank	Player	Years	Peak	Club(s)	Apps
1	(Australia) Sam Kerr	2017, 2018, 2019, 2020, 2021, 2022, 2023	1	Perth Glory, Sky Blue FC, Chicago Red Stars, Chelsea	7
2	(England) Lucy Bronze	2016, 2017, 2018, 2019, 2020, 2022	2	Manchester City, Lyon, Barcelona	6
3	(Norway) Caroline Graham Hansen	2020, 2021, 2022, 2023, 2024	2	Barcelona	5
3	(Denmark) Pernille Harder	2017, 2018, 2019, 2020, 2021	1	Wolfsburg, Chelsea	5
3	(Netherlands) Vivianne Miedema	2017, 2019, 2020, 2021, 2022	2	Arsenal	5
3	(France) Wendie Renard	2016, 2017, 2018, 2019, 2020	4	Lyon	5
3	(Spain) Aitana Bonmatí	2021, 2022, 2023, 2024, 2025	1	Barcelona	5
8	(Norway) Ada Hegerberg	2016, 2017, 2018, 2019	1	Lyon	4
9	(France) Amandine Henry	2018, 2019, 2020	5	Lyon	3
9	(Germany) Dzsenifer Marozsán	2016, 2017, 2020	5	Frankfurt, Lyon	3
9	(Netherlands) Lieke Martens	2017, 2018, 2021	1	Rosengård, Barcelona	3
9	(Spain) Alexia Putellas	2021, 2022, 2025	1	Barcelona	3
13	(France) Eugénie Le Sommer	2018, 2019	5	Lyon	2
13	(Brazil) Marta	2016, 2017	2	Rosengård, Orlando Pride	2
13	(United States) Alex Morgan	2017, 2018	7	Lyon, Orlando Pride	2
13	(Spain) Salma Paralluelo	2023, 2024	3	Barcelona	2
13	(Germany) Alexandra Popp	2022, 2023	6	Wolfsburg	2
13	(United States) Megan Rapinoe	2018, 2019	3	Seattle Reign	2
13	(England) Keira Walsh	2022, 2023	4	Manchester City, Barcelona	2
20	(Zambia) Barbra Banda	2024	7	Orlando Pride	1
20	(Germany) Melanie Behringer	2016	3	Bayern Munich	1
20	(France) Delphine Cascarino	2020	10	Lyon	1
20	(England) Mary Earps	2023	9	Manchester United	1
20	(United States) Julie Ertz	2020	9	Chicago Red Stars	1
20	(United States) Naomi Girma	2024	10	San Diego Wave	1
20	(United States) Tobin Heath	2016	9	Portland Thorns	1
20	(Spain) Jennifer Hermoso	2021	6	Barcelona	1
20	(United States) Lindsey Horan	2024	6	Lyon	1
20	(England) Lauren James	2023	10	Chelsea	1
20	(England) Fran Kirby	2021	7	Chelsea	1
20	(United States) Rose Lavelle	2019	7	Washington Spirit	1
20	(Spain) Mapi León	2023	8	Barcelona	1
20	(Scotland) Kim Little	2016	4	Arsenal	1
20	(United States) Carli Lloyd	2016	7	Houston Dash	1
20	(England) Beth Mead	2022	2	Arsenal	1
20	(Germany) Lena Oberdorf	2022	5	Wolfsburg	1
20	(Spain) Irene Paredes	2021	8	PSG, Barcelona	1
20	(United States) Trinity Rodman	2024	5	Washington Spirit	1
20	(Sweden) Fridolina Rolfö	2023	5	Barcelona	1
20	(Jamaica) Khadija Shaw	2024	4	Manchester City	1
20	(Canada) Christine Sinclair	2016	6	Portland Thorns	1
20	(United States) Sophia Smith	2024	3	Portland Thorns	1
20	(United States) Mallory Swanson	2024	9	Chicago Red Stars	1
20	(Spain) Mariona Caldentey	2025	2	Barcelona	1
20	(England) Alessia Russo	2025	3	Arsenal	1
20	(England) Hannah Hampton	2025	5	Chelsea	1
20	(Malawi) Temwa Chawinga	2025	6	Kansas City Current	1
20	(Spain) Patri Guijarro	2025	7	Barcelona	1
20	(Poland) Ewa Pajor	2025	8	Barcelona	1
20	(Spain) Clàudia Pina	2025	9	Barcelona	1
20	(England) Leah Williamson	2025	10	Arsenal	1

== Most Appearances ==
As of 2025, out of the 317 players that have been included in the list, only 3 have been included in the Top 100 every year since it was first published in 2016.

Apps	Player	Years	Peak	Teams
10	(Denmark) Pernille Harder	2016, 2017, 2018, 2019, 2020, 2021, 2022, 2023, 2024, 2025	1	Wolfsburg, Chelsea F.C., FC Bayern München
10	(England) Lucy Bronze	2016, 2017, 2018, 2019, 2020, 2021, 2022, 2023, 2024, 2025	2	Manchester City, Lyon, Barcelona, Chelsea F.C.
10	(France) Wendie Renard	2016, 2017, 2018, 2019, 2020, 2021, 2022, 2023, 2024, 2025	4	Lyon
9	(Spain) Jenni Hermoso	2016, 2017, 2018, 2019, 2020, 2021, 2022, 2023, 2024	6	Barcelona, PSG, Atlético de Madrid, C.F. Pachuca, Tigres UANL
9	(Japan) Saki Kumagai	2016, 2017, 2018, 2019, 2020, 2021, 2022, 2023, 2024	11	Lyon, FC Bayern München, AS Roma
9	(Norway) Caroline Graham Hansen	2017, 2018, 2019, 2020, 2021, 2022, 2023, 2024, 2025	2	Wolfsburg, Barcelona
9	(Germany) Alexandra Popp	2016, 2017, 2018, 2019, 2020, 2022, 2023, 2024, 2025	6	Wolfsburg
9	(Spain) Irene Paredes	2017, 2018, 2019, 2020, 2021, 2022, 2023, 2024, 2025	8	PSG, Barcelona
8	(Netherlands) Lieke Martens	2016, 2017, 2018, 2019, 2020, 2021, 2022, 2023	1	Rosengård, Barcelona, PSG
8	(United States) Lindsey Horan	2017, 2018, 2019, 2020, 2021, 2022, 2023, 2024	6	Portland Thorns, Lyon
8	(Netherlands) Danielle van de Donk	2017, 2018, 2019, 2020, 2021, 2022, 2023, 2024	16	Arsenal, Lyon
8	(Nigeria) Asisat Oshoala	2017, 2018, 2019, 2020, 2021, 2022, 2023, 2024	32	Dalian Quanjian F.C., Barcelona, Bay FC
8	(Netherlands) Vivianne Miedema	2016, 2017, 2018, 2019, 2020, 2021, 2022, 2025	2	Arsenal, Manchester City
8	(Scotland) Kim Little	2016, 2018, 2019, 2020, 2021, 2022, 2024, 2025	4	Arsenal
8	(Brazil) Debinha	2018, 2019, 2020, 2021, 2022, 2023, 2024, 2025	13	North Carolina Courage, Kansas City Current
8	(Sweden) Stina Blackstenius	2016, 2017, 2018, 2019, 2021, 2022, 2023, 2025	17	Linköping FC, Montpellier HSC, BK Häcken FF, Arsenal
8	(England) Millie Bright	2017, 2018, 2020, 2021, 2022, 2023, 2024, 2025	19	Chelsea F.C.
8	(Poland) Ewa Pajor	2018, 2019, 2020, 2021, 2022, 2023, 2024, 2025	8	Wolfsburg, Barcelona
8	(Malawi) Tabitha Chawinga	2016, 2017, 2018, 2019, 2020, 2023, 2024, 2025	6	Kvarnsvedens IK, Jiangsu Suning L.F.C., Wuhan Jianghan University F.C., Inter Milan, PSG, Lyon, Kansas City Current
8	(United States) Lindsey Heaps	2018, 2019, 2020, 2021, 2022, 2023, 2024, 2025	6	Portland Thorns FC, Lyon
7	(Australia) Sam Kerr	2017, 2018, 2019, 2020, 2021, 2022, 2023	1	Perth Glory, Sky Blue FC, Chicago Red Stars, Chelsea
7	(France) Amandine Henry	2016, 2017, 2018, 2019, 2020, 2021, 2022	5	Lyon
7	(France) Eugénie Le Sommer	2016, 2017, 2018, 2019, 2020, 2021, 2023	5	Lyon
7	(Canada) Christine Sinclair	2016, 2017, 2018, 2019, 2020, 2021, 2022	6	Portland Thorns
7	(Chile) Christiane Endler	2018, 2019, 2020, 2021, 2022, 2023, 2024	12	PSG, Lyon
7	(South Korea) Ji So-Yun	2016, 2017, 2018, 2019, 2020, 2021, 2022	16	Chelsea F.C., Suwon FC
7	(Germany) Lina Magull	2017, 2018, 2019, 2020, 2021, 2022, 2023	25	SC Freiburg, FC Bayern München
7	(United States) Lynn Williams	2016, 2017, 2018, 2019, 2020, 2023, 2024	38	Western New York Flash, North Carolina Courage, Western Sydney Wanderers FC, NJ/NY Gotham FC
7	(Spain) Alexia Putellas	2018, 2019, 2020, 2021, 2022, 2024, 2025	1	Barcelona
7	(Spain) Patri Guijarro	2018, 2020, 2021, 2022, 2023, 2024, 2025	7	Barcelona
7	(Jamaica) Khadija Shaw	2019, 2020, 2021, 2022, 2023, 2024, 2025	4	Bordeaux, Manchester City
7	(France) Kadidiatou Diani	2019, 2020, 2021, 2022, 2023, 2024, 2025	12	Paris Saint-Germain, Lyon
7	(Spain) Mapi León	2019, 2020, 2021, 2022, 2023, 2024, 2025	8	Barcelona
7	(Sweden) Fridolina Rolfö	2018, 2019, 2021, 2022, 2023, 2024, 2025	5	FC Bayern München, VfL Wolfsburg, Barcelona, Manchester United
7	(Norway) Guro Reiten	2018, 2019, 2020, 2022, 2023, 2024, 2025	22	Chelsea F.C.
7	(Australia) Ellie Carpenter	2019, 2020, 2021, 2022, 2023, 2024, 2025	58	Portland Thorns FC, Melbourne City, Lyon, Chelsea F.C.

== Overall ==
=== By nationality ===
As of the 2025 edition, players from 39 nations have made up the Top 100. The United States has been the most represented nation in total (131) with a record 19 individuals in 2019. In 2020, Germany became the first nation other than the United States to be the most represented. Spain became the third nation to have the most selections with 15 in 2023, retaining top spot the following year. Mexico is the most recent nation to debut following the inclusion of Lizbeth Ovalle in 2024.

Nationality is defined under FIFA eligibility rules. Players may hold more than one non-FIFA nationality.

Rank	Nation	2016	2017	2018	2019	2020	2021	2022	2023	2024	2025	Total
1	United States	16	18	16	19	9	15	11	7	12	9	131
2	England	14	11	11	10	10	10	13	12	14	14	119
3	Germany	10	7	11	7	13	10	14	5	10	6	93
4	France	12	6	9	10	10	12	10	6	7	8	90
5	Spain	3	4	4	7	8	10	10	15	15	13	89
6	Sweden	8	2	5	9	8	9	4	6	2	5	58
7	Netherlands	4	9	6	6	8	4	5	8	2	2	54
8	Australia	6	8	5	2	3	2	3	8	3	3	43
9	Brazil	3	5	4	5	4	2	4	3	5	6	41
10	Norway	3	4	4	5	4	1	3	3	5	5	37
11	Japan	4	3	4	4	2	2	3	5	4	2	33
12	Canada	3	4	2	2	3	6	5	3	1	1	30
13	Scotland	3	0	1	2	3	2	3	2	3	3	22
14	Denmark	2	4	3	1	2	1	1	1	1	1	17
15	Nigeria	0	1	1	1	1	1	1	2	1	4	13
16	Switzerland	1	2	3	0	1	1	1	1	1	1	12
17	Italy	0	0	0	1	2	2	1	1	1	2	10
17	Malawi	1	1	1	1	1	0	0	1	2	2	10
19	Poland	0	0	1	1	1	2	1	1	1	1	9
20	Colombia	0	0	0	0	0	0	1	2	2	3	8
21	Chile	0	0	1	1	1	1	1	1	1	0	7
21	Iceland	1	1	1	1	1	0	0	1	1	0	7
21	South Korea	1	1	1	1	1	1	1	0	0	0	7
21	Jamaica	0	0	0	1	1	1	1	1	1	1	7
25	(Republic of Ireland) Ireland	0	0	0	1	1	1	0	1	1	1	6
25	Zambia	0	0	0	0	0	1	0	1	2	2	6
27	Austria	0	3	0	0	0	1	1	0	0	0	5
27	Wales	1	1	1	0	0	1	1	0	0	0	5
29	Portugal	1	1	1	1	0	0	0	0	0	0	4
29	Venezuela	1	1	1	0	0	1	0	0	0	0	4
29	Haiti	0	0	0	0	0	0	1	1	1	1	4
32	Belgium	1	1	1	0	0	0	0	0	0	0	3
32	Mexico	0	0	0	0	0	0	0	0	1	2	3
34	China	1	0	1	0	0	0	0	0	0	0	2
34	Costa Rica	0	2	0	0	0	0	0	0	0	0	2
34	New Zealand	0	0	1	1	0	0	0	0	0	0	2
34	Serbia	0	0	0	0	1	0	0	1	0	0	2
34	Morocco	0	0	0	0	0	0	0	0	0	2	2
39	Finland	0	0	0	0	1	0	0	0	0	0	1
39	South Africa	0	0	0	0	0	0	0	1	0	0	1

==== Nationalities by continent ====
The European confederation has had the most players selected every year.

Continent refers to the corresponding continental confederation of the player's nationality.

Rank	Confederation	2016	2017	2018	2019	2020	2021	2022	2023	2024	2025	Total
1	Europe	64	56	62	62	74	67	68	64	64	62	643
2	North America	19	24	18	22	13	22	18	12	16	14	178
3	Asia	12	12	11	7	6	5	7	13	7	2	82
4	South America	4	6	6	6	5	4	6	6	8	9	60
5	Africa	1	2	2	2	2	2	1	5	5	10	32
6	Oceania	0	0	1	1	0	0	0	0	0	3	5

=== By club ===
As of the 2025 edition, players playing for 98 clubs have been selected. French club Lyon has had the most players in the Top 100 with 126 selections in total. In 2022, Barcelona became the first club other than Lyon to have the most players selected in a single year and retained the top spot the following two years. The record for most players selected in a single year is 17, set by Barcelona in 2024. Clubs are counted when a player in the Top 100 played for that team in the same calendar year they were selected. Players may have played for multiple clubs per year.

Rank	Club	2016	2017	2018	2019	2020	2021	2022	2023	2024	2025	Total
1	(France) Lyon	15	12	14	12	12	15	13	10	13	10	126
2	(Spain) Barcelona	3	5	4	8	10	14	14	15	17	12	102
3	(England) Chelsea	7	7	5	8	11	9	10	10	9	15	91
4	(England) Arsenal	5	5	5	6	9	11	8	11	9	14	83
5	(Germany) Wolfsburg	8	7	11	11	10	4	10	5	5	1	72
6	(France) Paris Saint-Germain	7	7	5	7	9	12	7	7	5	3	69
7	(England) Manchester City	8	7	5	4	7	8	8	8	7	6	68
8	(Germany) Bayern Munich	6	4	4	4	6	8	8	8	6	4	58
9	(United States) Portland Thorns	5	7	4	4	2	4	4	1	2	1	34
10	(United States) North Carolina Courage	0	4	8	8	5	2	2	1	0	1	30
11	(Spain) Real Madrid	0	0	0	2	2	3	4	7	4	2	24
11	(United States) Orlando Pride	4	6	4	2	0	1	0	1	3	3	24
13	(United States) Seattle Reign	4	4	5	1	0	5	4	0	0	0	23
14	(United States) Chicago Red Stars	2	2	4	5	2	2	1	0	2	0	20
15	(England) Manchester United	0	0	0	1	1	1	4	5	4	3	19
16	(United States) Washington Spirit	2	1	1	3	1	2	1	1	2	4	18
17	(United States) NJ/NY Gotham FC	0	3	0	1	0	2	0	2	5	3	16
17	(Sweden) Rosengård	4	2	3	1	3	2	0	0	1	0	16
19	(United States) Houston Dash	5	2	1	1	3	1	1	0	1	0	15
20	(Germany) Eintracht Frankfurt	4	3	1	1	1	0	1	0	1	1	13
21	(France) Montpellier	3	3	2	3	1	0	0	0	0	0	12
22	(Australia) Melbourne City	4	1	4	1	1	0	0	0	0	0	11
23	(Sweden) Linköpings	3	2	1	3	1	0	0	0	0	0	10
23	(Italy) Juventus	0	0	0	1	2	3	2	1	0	1	10
25	(Spain) Atlético Madrid	0	1	1	3	2	2	0	0	0	0	9
25	(United States) San Diego Wave	0	0	0	0	0	0	3	3	2	1	9
27	(Germany) Turbine Potsdam	3	3	2	0	0	0	0	0	0	0	8
28	(United States) Kansas City Current	0	0	0	0	0	0	0	1	2	4	7
29	(United States) Utah Royals	0	0	2	4	0	0	0	0	0	0	6
30	(France) Bordeaux	0	0	0	1	2	2	0	0	0	0	5
30	(Norway) LSK Kvinner	2	0	1	2	0	0	0	0	0	0	5
32	(England) Aston Villa	0	0	0	0	0	1	1	2	0	0	4
32	(Australia) Canberra United	1	1	0	2	0	0	0	0	0	0	4
32	(Germany) Essen	0	0	2	1	1	0	0	0	0	0	4
32	(Netherlands) FC Twente	0	2	0	0	0	0	1	1	0	0	4
32	(Germany) Freiburg	0	1	1	1	1	0	0	0	0	0	4
32	(Spain) Levante	0	0	0	0	0	1	0	2	1	0	4
32	(Italy) Roma	0	0	0	0	0	0	0	2	2	0	4
32	(Australia) Sydney FC	1	2	1	0	0	0	0	0	0	0	4
32	(Norway) Vålerenga	0	1	1	1	1	0	0	0	0	0	4
41	(United States) Angel City FC	0	0	0	0	0	0	0	2	1	0	3
41	(Sweden) BK Häcken	0	0	0	0	2	1	0	0	0	0	3
41	(Australia) Brisbane Roar	0	1	1	1	0	0	0	0	0	0	3
41	(China) Dalian	1	1	1	0	0	0	0	0	0	0	3
41	(United States) FSU Seminoles	1	1	1	0	0	0	0	0	0	0	3
41	(Germany) Hoffenheim	0	1	0	0	0	1	1	0	0	0	3
41	(Japan) INAC Kobe	0	0	1	1	0	0	0	1	0	0	3
41	(China) Jiangsu Suning	0	0	1	1	1	0	0	0	0	0	3
41	(Spain) Madrid CFF	0	0	0	0	0	0	1	1	1	0	3
41	(Australia) Perth Glory	0	1	1	1	0	0	0	0	0	0	3
41	(Mexico) Tigres UANL	0	0	0	0	0	0	1	0	2	0	3
41	(United States) UCLA Bruins	1	1	0	1	0	0	0	0	0	0	3
41	(Japan) Vegalta Sendai	0	2	0	0	0	0	0	1	0	0	3
41	(England) West Ham United	0	0	0	0	1	0	1	1	0	0	3
41	(United States) Western New York Flash	3	0	0	0	0	0	0	0	0	0	3
41	(Australia) Western Sydney Wanderers	0	0	0	2	1	0	0	0	0	0	3
41	(United States) Bay FC	0	0	0	0	0	0	0	0	2	1	3
59	(Italy) AC Milan	0	0	0	0	0	0	1	1	0	0	2
59	(England) Birmingham City	0	0	1	1	0	0	0	0	0	0	2
59	(China) Changchun Zhuoyue	0	1	1	0	0	0	0	0	0	0	2
59	(Brazil) Corinthians	0	0	0	0	0	0	0	0	2	0	2
59	(United States) FC Kansas City	1	1	0	0	0	0	0	0	0	0	2
59	(Sweden) Hammarby	0	0	1	0	0	0	0	1	0	0	2
59	(Sweden) Kvarnsvedens	1	1	0	0	0	0	0	0	0	0	2
59	(Mexico) Pachuca	0	0	0	0	0	0	1	1	0	1	2
59	(France) Paris FC	1	0	0	0	0	0	0	1	0	1	2
59	(Netherlands) PSV Eindhoven	0	0	0	0	1	0	0	1	0	0	2
59	(Germany) SC Sand	0	2	0	0	0	0	0	0	0	0	2
59	(France) Stade de Reims	0	0	0	0	0	0	1	1	0	0	2
59	(China) Wuhan	0	0	1	0	0	0	0	1	0	0	2
59	(England) Brighton & Hove Albion	0	0	0	0	1	0	0	0	0	1	2
59	(England) London City Lionesses	0	0	0	0	1	0	0	0	0	1	2
74	(Japan) AC Nagano	0	1	0	0	0	0	0	0	0	0	1
74	(Netherlands) Achilles '29	0	1	0	0	0	0	0	0	0	0	1
74	(United States) Boston Breakers	1	0	0	0	0	0	0	0	0	0	1
74	(Denmark) Brøndby	0	1	0	0	0	0	0	0	0	0	1
74	(Colombia) Deportivo Cali	0	0	0	0	0	0	1	0	0	0	1
74	(England) Everton	0	0	0	0	1	0	0	0	0	0	1
74	(Italy) Inter Milan	0	0	0	0	0	0	0	1	0	0	1
74	(Japan) JEF United	1	0	0	0	0	0	0	0	0	0	1
74	(England) Liverpool	0	1	0	0	0	0	0	0	0	0	1
74	(Australia) Newcastle Jets	0	0	1	0	0	0	0	0	0	0	1
74	(Japan) Okayama Yunogo Belle	1	0	0	0	0	0	0	0	0	0	1
74	(Sweden) Örebro	1	0	0	0	0	0	0	0	0	0	1
74	(United States) Racing Louisville	0	0	0	0	0	0	0	1	0	0	1
74	(England) Reading	0	0	0	0	0	1	0	0	0	0	1
74	(Brazil) Santos	0	0	0	0	1	0	0	0	0	0	1
74	(Brazil) São Paulo	0	0	0	1	0	0	0	0	0	0	1
74	(China) Shanghai Shengli	0	0	0	0	0	1	0	0	0	0	1
74	(South Korea) Suwon FC	0	0	0	0	0	0	1	0	0	0	1
74	(England) Tottenham Hotspur	0	0	0	0	0	0	0	0	1	0	1
74	(Japan) Urawa Red Diamonds	0	0	0	1	0	0	0	0	0	0	1
74	(United States) West Virginia Mountaineers	1	0	0	0	0	0	0	0	0	0	1
74	(Canada) AFC Toronto	0	0	0	0	0	0	0	0	0	1	1
74	(Saudi Arabia) Al-Hilal	0	0	0	0	0	0	0	0	0	1	1
74	(Brazil) Palmeiras	0	0	0	0	0	0	0	0	0	1	1
74	(Norway) SK Brann	0	0	0	0	0	0	0	0	0	1	1

==== Clubs by nation ====
For the first four years, the United States league system had the most players selected. Since 2020, England has been the most represented and set a new record of 42 players in 2025.

Rank	Nation	2016	2017	2018	2019	2020	2021	2022	2023	2024	2025	Total
1	England	20	20	16	20	31	31	32	37	30	42	279
2	United States	30	32	30	30	13	19	16	13	22	18	223
3	France	26	22	21	23	24	29	21	19	18	14	217
4	Germany	21	21	21	18	19	13	20	13	12	6	164
5	Spain	3	6	5	13	14	20	19	25	23	14	142
6	Sweden	9	5	5	4	6	3	0	1	1	0	34
7	Australia	6	6	8	7	2	0	0	0	0	0	29
8	Italy	0	0	0	1	2	3	3	5	2	1	17
9	China	1	2	4	1	1	1	0	1	0	0	11
10	Japan	2	3	1	2	0	0	0	2	0	0	10
11	Norway	2	1	2	3	1	0	0	0	0	1	9
12	Netherlands	0	3	0	0	1	0	1	2	0	0	7
13	Mexico	0	0	0	0	0	0	2	1	2	1	5
14	Brazil	0	0	0	1	1	0	0	0	2	1	4
15	Colombia	0	0	0	0	0	0	1	0	0	0	1
15	Denmark	0	1	0	0	0	0	0	0	0	0	1
15	South Korea	0	0	0	0	0	0	1	0	0	0	1
15	Canada	0	0	0	0	0	0	0	0	0	1	1
15	Saudi Arabia	0	0	0	0	0	0	0	0	0	1	1

== See also ==
- List of sports awards honouring women
- The Best FIFA Women's Player
- Ballon d'Or Féminin
- FIFPRO Women's World 11
- BBC Women's Footballer of the Year
- The Guardian 100 Best Male Footballers in the World
- The Guardian Footballer of the Year
