= Ana González (footballer) =

Spanish footballer (born 1995)

Personal information
- Full name: Ana González Rosa
- Date of birth: 26 March 1995 (age 31)
- Place of birth: Seville, Spain
- Height: 1.61 m (5 ft 3 in)
- Position: Defender

Team information
- Current team: Madrid CFF
- Number: 6

Senior career*
| Years | Team | Apps | (Gls) |
| 2009–2013 | Sevilla B | | |
| 2012–2014 | Sevilla | 37 | (0) |
| 2014–2022 | Real Betis | 95+ | (5+) |
| 2022–2024 | Madrid CFF | 53 | (7) |
| 2024–2026 | Badalona | 43 | (4) |
| 2026– | Madrid CFF | 11 | (0) |
- * Club domestic league appearances and goals as of 18:57, 16 November 2026 (UTC)

Ana González Rosa (born 26 March 1995) is a Spanish professional footballer who plays as a defender for Liga F club Madrid CFF.

== Club career ==
González started her career at Sevilla B.
