= Nuria Rábano =

Spanish footballer (born 1999)

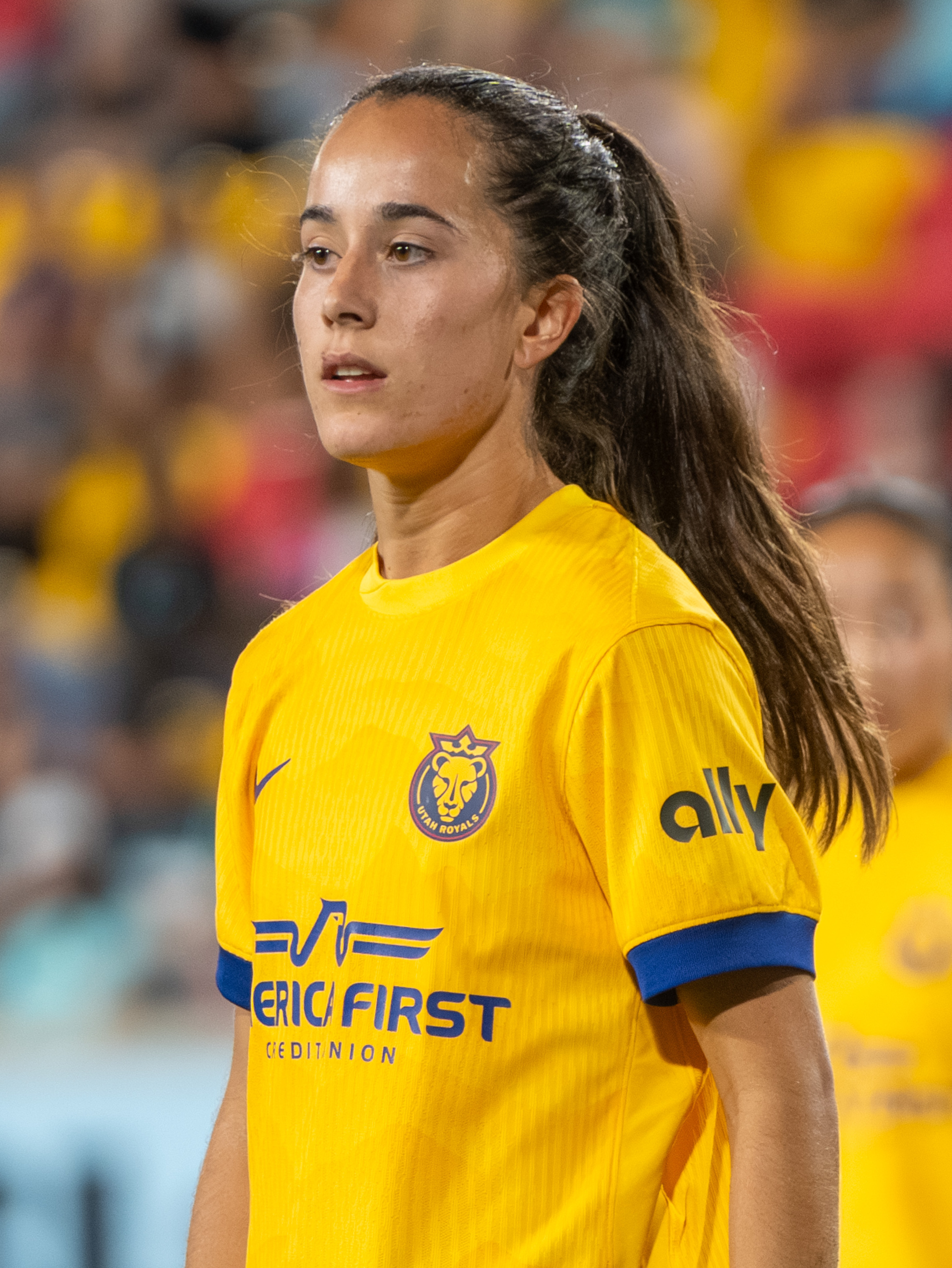
- Rábano with the Utah Royals in 2025

Personal information
- Full name: Nuria Rábano Blanco
- Date of birth: 15 June 1999 (age 27)
- Place of birth: Santiago de Compostela, Spain
- Height: 1.65 m (5 ft 5 in)
- Position: Left back

Team information
- Current team: Utah Royals
- Number: 14

Senior career*
| Years | Team | Apps | (Gls) |
| 2015–2016 | Atlético Arousana | | |
| 2016–2020 | Deportivo La Coruña | 20+ | |
| 2020–2022 | Real Sociedad | 57 | (0) |
| 2022–2023 | Barcelona | 18 | (0) |
| 2023–2025 | VfL Wolfsburg | 25 | (0) |
| 2025– | Utah Royals | 46 | (0) |

International career^{‡}
| 2015 | Spain U17 | 3 | (0) |
| 2017 | Spain U19 | 5 | (0) |
| 2018 | Spain U20 | 1 | (0) |
| 2022– | Spain | 1 | (0) |
- * Club domestic league appearances and goals as of 04:24, 10 November 2026 (UTC) ‡ National team caps and goals as of 11 October 2022

Nuria Rábano Blanco (born 15 June 1999) is a Spanish professional footballer who plays as a left back for the Utah Royals in the National Women's Soccer League (NWSL) and the Spain national team.

== Club career ==
=== Deportivo la Coruña (2016–20) ===
Rábano started her career at Atlético Arousana before joining Deportivo la Coruña in 2016.While at Deportivo, Rábano was a starter in their undefeated 2018–19 Reto Iberdrola campaign that saw them get promoted to the Primera División for the first time in their history.

In Depor's first Primera División season, Rábano helped the team reach 4th place before the league season was cut short due to the COVID-19 pandemic. She made the decision to leave Depor at the end of the season because she felt it was time to play a higher level of football.

=== Real Sociedad (2020–22) ===
At the end of the 2019–20 season, Rábano departed Deportivo la Coruña to sign a two-year contract with Real Sociedad. In the 2021–22 season, Rábano was an essential piece of Real Sociedad's defense as they qualified for the UEFA Women's Champions League for the first time in their history.

=== Barcelona (2022–2023) ===
On 17 June 2022, Barcelona announced the signing of Rábano on a two-year contract.

On 4 July 2023, Rábano and Barcelona agreed to terminate her contract after she appeared sporadically throughout the season.

=== VfL Wolfsburg (2023–2025) ===
Rábano signed with VfL Wolfsburg on 9 August 2023, joining the German club on a free transfer.

=== Utah Royals (2025–) ===
On 29 January 2025, Rábano transferred to National Women's Soccer League club Utah Royals in exchange for an undisclosed fee. She signed a three-year contract with a mutual option.

== International career ==
Rábano was called up to represent Spain at the 2017 Under-19 Championship. In Spain's second group stage match against Germany, she suffered a sprain in the ligament of her right ankle and was ruled out for the remainder of the competition. Spain went on to win the competition against France to advance to the 2018 U20 World Cup. Rábano was included in the squad for that tournament as well, and was a substitute throughout the tournament as Spain finished as runners-up.

== Honours ==
FC Barcelona

- UEFA Women's Champions League: 2022–23
- Primera División: 2022–23
- Supercopa de España: 2022–23
