= 2023–24 FC Barcelona Femení season =

Barcelona Femení
2023–24 season
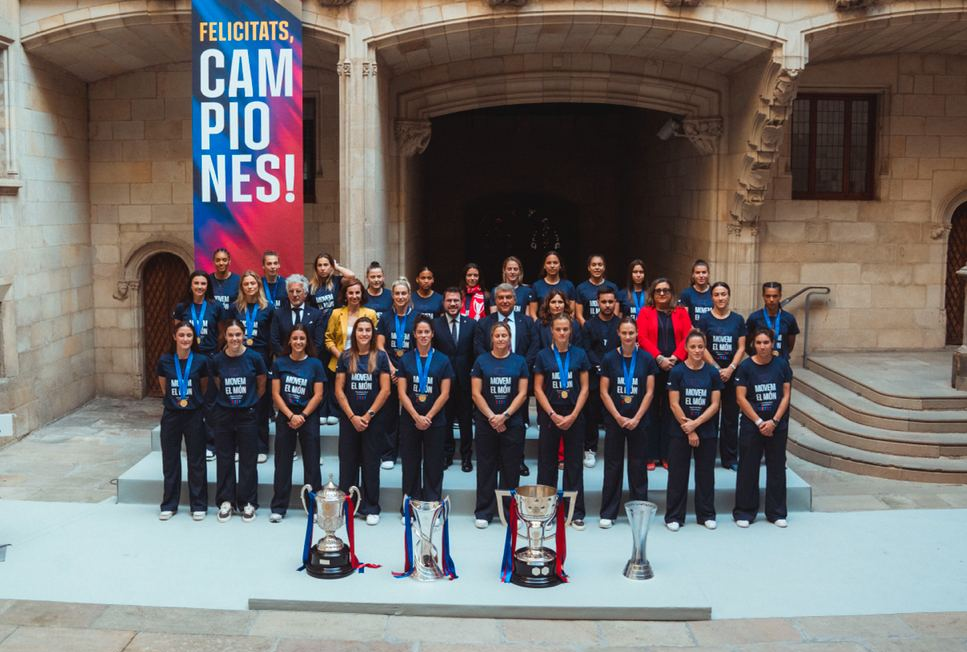
- The team with their four trophies in May 2024
- President: Joan Laporta
- Head coach: Jonatan Giráldez
- Stadium: Johan Cruyff Stadium; Estadi Olímpic Lluís Companys (select matches)
- Liga F: Winners
- Copa de la Reina: Winners
- Supercopa de España: Winners
- UEFA Champions League: Winners
- Top goalscorer: League: Caroline Graham Hansen (21 goals); All: Salma Paralluelo (34 goals)
- Highest home attendance: 38,707 vs Real Madrid (19 November 2023)
- Lowest home attendance: 2,885 vs Valencia (5 October 2023)
- Average home league attendance: 6,969
- Biggest win: Home: Barcelona 9–1 Las Planas; Barcelona 8–0 Sevilla; Barcelona 8–0 Madrid CFF; Away: Real Sociedad 0–8 Barcelona
- Biggest defeat: Barcelona 0–1 Chelsea
Home colours	Away colours	Third colours

The 2023–24 season was the 36th season in the history of FC Barcelona Femení. The team competed in and won each of the domestic league, the Copa de la Reina, the Supercopa de España Femenina and the UEFA Women's Champions League; ahead of the season they were the defending champions of the league, Supercopa, and Champions League.

Barcelona ended the season with their first continental quadruple, winning 45 out of 48 matches played across all competitions with a 94% win rate; the team lost only one match, the first leg of the UEFA Women's Champions League semi-finals against Chelsea.

Barcelona won the 2023–24 Supercopa de España Femenina on 20 January 2024 and won the league title for the fifth consecutive season and for the ninth time overall on 4 May 2024; they ended the league season unbeaten with 29 wins and only one draw. They completed the domestic treble after they defeated Real Sociedad 8–0 in the Copa de la Reina final on 18 May 2024, winning a record tenth Copa de la Reina title. With the eight goals scored, Barcelona equalled the biggest win ever in a Copa de la Reina final.

As well as record titles, Barcelona had its most prolific season ever in terms of goals, scoring 211 goals in all competitions with a goal difference of +192. Caroline Graham Hansen had one of the best individual seasons ever for goal contributions, scoring 32 and assisting 28 for a total of 60 goal contributions across all competitions; Graham Hansen won the Pichichi award for the most goals scored in the league, with 21. She was not Barcelona's highest goalscorer, however, with Salma Paralluelo ending the season with 34 goals in all competitions. The team had 20 different goal-scorers and 19 different assisters throughout the season, and kept a clean sheet in 33 matches.

On 25 May 2024, Barcelona completed the second continental treble and the first continental quadruple in the team's history by defeating Lyon 2–0 in the Champions League final in front of 50,827 spectators, defending the previous season's title and winning the Champions League for the third time overall.

During the season, head coach Jonatan Giráldez announced that he would leave the club at the end of the season. Midfielder Aitana Bonmatí succeeded teammate Alexia Putellas in winning all of Europe's major individual awards for women's football.

== Kits ==
- Supplier: Nike
- Sponsors: Spotify (front) / Grupo Bimbo (sleeve) / UNHCR – The UN Refugee Agency (back)

Home (Note: The home shirt features classic broad blaugrana stripes. The crest includes a semi-transparent diamond, inspired by the logo of the team who played the first ever Barça women's football match at the Camp Nou in 1970.)	Away (Note: The away kit is predominantly white, inspired by a kit worn by Johan Cruyff in the 1970s. The crest is that used in 1978.)	Third (Note: The third kit is intended as a visual metaphor of the "Barça DNA". Using traditional Barça away aqua blue, a weave pattern in blaugrana evokes DNA. Barça DNA is the history, playing style, and development of young talent at the club.)	Fourth (Note: The fourth kit is the same as the previous season; it features the Catalan senyera flag on the chest horizontally to pay tribute to the club's Catalan identity.)	Goalkeeper 1	Goalkeeper 2	Goalkeeper 3

== Season overview ==
=== June 2023 ===
Barcelona finished the previous season on 3 June 2023, winning the 2022–23 UEFA Women's Champions League.

Defensive midfielder María Pérez, who played in the first team for several seasons while on a B team contract, extended her deal on 7 June. She signed a permanent first team contract until June 2025. On 19 June, Barcelona announced the signing of right-back Ona Batlle on a free transfer from Manchester United. There was one departure in June, of Emma Ramírez; though she had a contract until the end of the 2023–24 season, Ramírez and the club came to a mutual agreement for contract termination.

=== July ===
On 4 July, the club announced that it had terminated the contract of Nuria Rábano.

Mariona Caldentey became the first female footballer to be awarded Catalunya Ràdio's Trofeu Kubala for the best goal of the previous season, for her long-range goal against FC Rosengård in the previous season's Champions League, which was announced on 8 July. Caldentey then joined many of her teammates at the 2023 FIFA Women's World Cup, which began on 20 July; Barcelona was the most-represented club at the tournament, with 18 players for eight national teams: including new signing Batlle and Giulia Dragoni of the B team, they counted 9 for Spain, 2 each for England and Norway, and 1 each for Brazil, Italy, Nigeria, Sweden and Switzerland.

The Catalan government announced on 25 July that the institution of the women's team had been awarded the Medalla d'Honor del Parlament de Catalunya, being the first sports team to receive it. Catalan president Anna Erra announced the honour with a speech detailing the virtues of the team and its status as a reference. The first team received the honour in person on 13 September at the Palau del Parlament de Catalunya.

=== August ===
Pre-season training began on 1 August. There were only 8 players from the first team present at this first session, with the rest at the World Cup; 24 B and C team players, including new signings, also attended first team training. On 12 August, Barcelona opened the pre-season with a 3–0 win against AEM Lleida in a friendly played behind closed doors at the Ciutat Esportiva Joan Gamper. Clàudia Pina, Ariana Arias and Martine Fenger scored the goals for the team. Though still missing all of the World Cup players, and with only 13 B team players continuing to train for the pre-season, the matchday squad was managed so that nobody (for Barcelona) played more than 45 minutes.

A possible starting XI of the Barcelona players in the World Cup final, as proposed by ESPN FC.

During the World Cup, Keira Walsh (England) and Laia Codina and Aitana Bonmatí (Spain) experienced injuries, but were fit to continue, with all three contributing to Barcelona being the most-represented club in the semifinals: England, Spain, and Sweden made it to the final four. Following their semifinal victories, Spain and England both reached the 2023 FIFA Women's World Cup final for the first time. Between the finalists, there were 11 Barcelona players: Batlle, Bonmatí, Caldentey, Codina, Cata Coll, Salma Paralluelo, Irene Paredes, María Pérez, and Alexia Putellas for Spain, and Walsh and Lucy Bronze for England. Sweden, including Fridolina Rolfö, lost their semi-final but went on to win the bronze medal match, and Rolfö was named player of the match.

Spain and England contested the FIFA World Cup final, with 10 of the 11 Barcelona players (all but María Pérez) featuring in the match. Spain won 1–0 to win their first women's senior title; England achieved their best performance at a World Cup as runners-up. Bonmatí received the Golden Ball award as the best player of the tournament, with Paralluelo named the best young player of the tournament. During the match, Codina had to be substituted with a recurrence of her injury.

The World Cup final match saw records set by several Barcelona players: Putellas became the first woman to have won the FIFA Women's World Cup, UEFA Women's Champions League and the Ballon d'Or; Paralluelo became the first woman to win the FIFA U-17 Women's World Cup, the FIFA U-20 Women's World Cup and the FIFA Women's World Cup, while also being the first player to hold both the U-20 World Cup and the senior World Cup titles at the same time; eight of the nine Barcelona players representing Spain became the first female players in history to win both the UEFA Champions League and the FIFA World Cup in the same year; and Bronze, starting her 20th career World Cup match, became the England player with the most starts in the World Cup.

There were also transfers in August: on the 18th, during the World Cup, it was announced that Manchester United had signed Geyse for €300,000 – the most expensive sale in Barça Femení history – and Arsenal had signed Codina. Codina's transfer to Arsenal was formally announced when the English club began training on 29 August, for a fee of just over €100,000. On 22 August, it was announced that the club had signed Dutch versatile player Esmee Brugts for free, with Brugts saying it had been her dream to play for Barcelona. It was also reported that María Pérez would be leaving the club on loan for a year, already having a return plan.

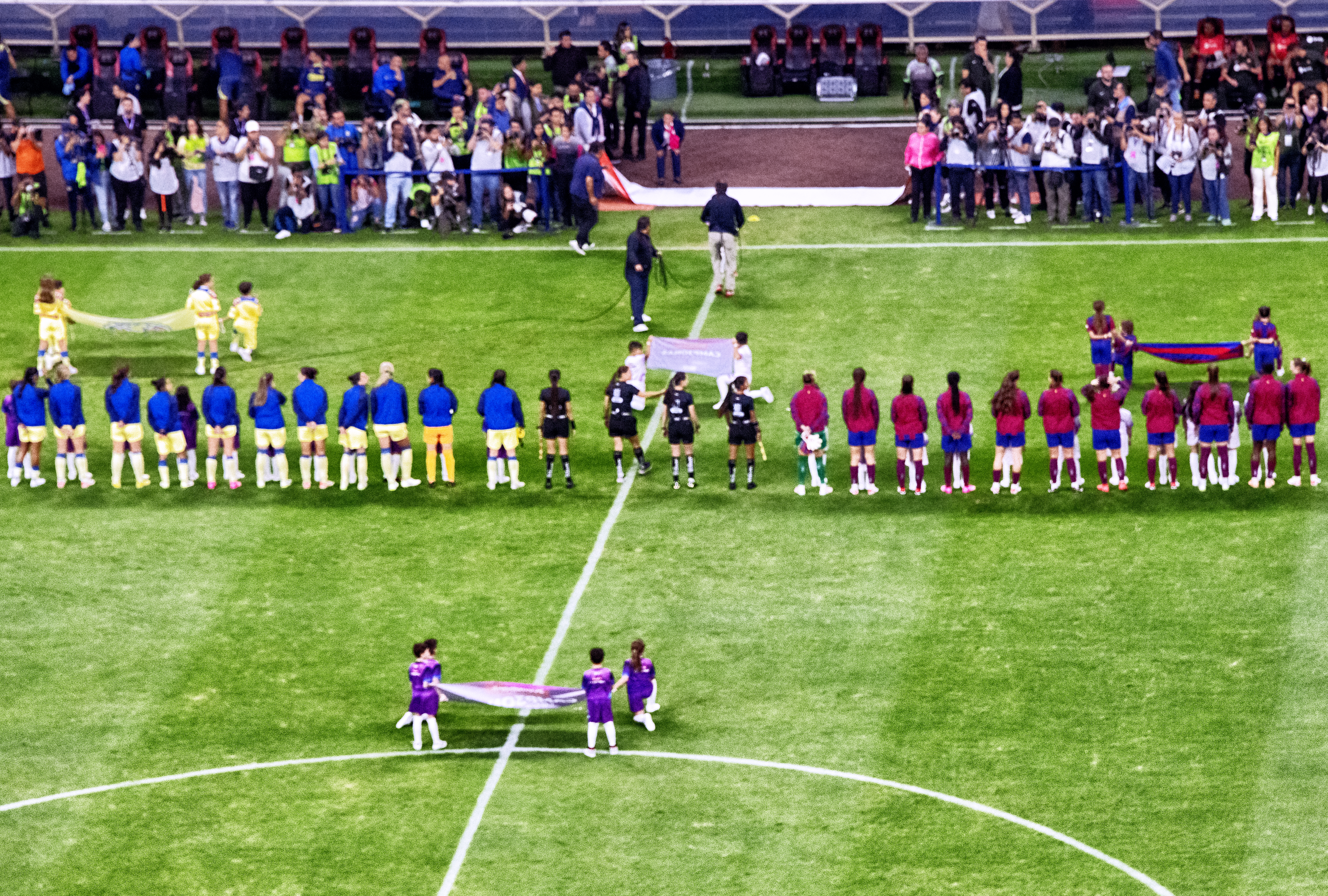
Barcelona (right) and Club América before their match on 29 August

Barcelona defeated Juventus 5–0 on 24 August to win the Joan Gamper Trophy for the third time before undertaking a pre-season champions tour in Mexico, playing their first match there on 29 August. They won the game for the CAMP3ONAS Tour 2023 invitational trophy by defeating Liga MX Femenil champions Club América 2–0 at the Estadio Azteca in front of 34,931 fans.

On 31 August, Barcelona midfielder Bonmatí won the UEFA Women's Player of the Year Award for her performances during the previous season. She became the third Barcelona player to win the award; including Putellas winning it twice, this made Barcelona the club with the most wins of the award (four). It also became the first club to receive the award in three consecutive years. There were three other Barcelona players in the top ten: Paralluelo (fifth), Walsh (seventh) and Caroline Graham Hansen (eighth). Coach Jonatan Giráldez came third for the UEFA Women's Coach of the Year Award.

=== September ===
Barcelona ended their Mexican tour and pre-season on 1 September with a 1–0 win against Tigres UANL in front of 39,501 spectators at the Estadio Universitario, finishing pre-season with a perfect record of five wins in five matches and no goals conceded.

On 5 September, Rolfö and the club confirmed that she would have surgery for a knee injury that had developed in prior months. The next day, she was one of six Barcelona players nominated for the Ballon d'Or Féminin, along with Paralluelo, Patri Guijarro, Bonmatí, Asisat Oshoala and Mapi León. Nominees for The Best FIFA Football Awards were announced on 14 September: Bonmatí, León, Paralluelo and Walsh were nominated for The Best FIFA Women's Player; Coll and Sandra Paños were nominated for The Best FIFA Women's Goalkeeper; and Giráldez was nominated for The Best FIFA Women's Coach.

The club transferred Swiss versatile player Ana-Maria Crnogorčević to Atlético Madrid for an undisclosed fee on 6 September, a few days before Barcelona was scheduled to play their first match of the 2023–24 Liga F (on 10 September). The match was rescheduled due to the Liga F players' strike. The team played their first game, matchday 2, on 16 September, recording a 2–0 away win. In the match, Brugts made her debut and Putellas became the second player in the club's history to reach 400 appearances with the club (only behind Melanie Serrano, who holds the record with 517 appearances).

The first matches of the 2023–24 UEFA Women's Nations League A were held in September. Some Barcelona players were not selected due to injury; others were selected despite having withdrawn; and León and Guijarro withdrew after being selected as a boycott. The international break also saw youth games played, with two of Barcelona's first team called up to Spain's under-23 team (one of whom, Pina, also withdrew). Following a turbulent time in the Spain team, Putellas and Paredes were reinstated as its captains, also helping broker the "Treaty of Oliva" as a roadmap to improving the RFEF's treatment of the national women's team.

=== October ===
The team played three league games (including the rescheduled first matchday) in the first week of October, winning 2–1 away to Sporting de Huelva; 6–0 against Valencia in their first home match of the season, including two own goals scored by Valencia defender Claudia Florentino; and 3–0 over Real Sociedad. The winning streak continued with a 1–0 victory over Atlético Madrid, in which Putellas became Barcelona's leading goalscorer with 182 goals, and the 6–1 defeat of Granada that featured Batlle's first senior goal for the club.

The draw for the 2023–24 UEFA Women's Champions League group stage took place on 20 October, with Barcelona drawn into Group A alongside Rosengård, Benfica and Eintracht Frankfurt – they had been in a similar group the previous year, with Frankfurt the only different (and still German) team.

On 30 October, Aitana Bonmatí won the Ballon d'Or Féminin, becoming the first women's player to win the World Cup; the Champions League; and the Ballon d'Or in the same year, and the first player to win the World Cup Golden Ball; the Champions League MVP; and the Ballon d'Or in the same year. Paralluelo, Rolfö, Guijarro, Mapi León and Oshoala were ranked 3rd, 4th, 8th, 16th and 20th respectively. The club received the Women's Club of the Year award, given to the team with the most nominees for the Ballon d'Or.

=== November ===
Barcelona improved their goalscoring in November right from the start, beating Sevilla 8–0 on 5 November – half the goals from Salma Paralluelo – and consolidating this in their next match, a 6–0 away win against Villarreal. On 19 November, Barcelona defeated Real Madrid 5–0 in the first Women's Clásico of the season in front of 38,707 spectators, to get their twelfth win in twelve games. They matched their scoreline for biggest win in a women's Clásico and took a new club record for largest home attendance in the league. It was also the team's 67th straight home win in the league, having not lost a league match at home since February 2019. Vicky López scored the team's fifth to become the youngest player (male or female) to score a goal in a Clásico.

In early November, Barcelona Femení announced that they had hired Marc Vivés as their new sports director following Markel Zubizarreta's departure at the start of the season. The club had spent a month and a half conducting an "exhaustive and intense" interview process; though renewals and other player issues were on hold during this time, the board felt the importance of having someone perfect for the job and the team outweighed speed. They also sought a candidate who would be able to handle another responsibility, planning a "step forward" in its women's development. It was reported that Vivés would join the Barcelona staff in December 2023, though he was present for the first squad's training session on 13 November.

The team had started their Champions League campaign on 14 November with a 5–0 win against Benfica. Putellas and Bonmatí scored two goals each, and Oshoala closed the match with a bicycle kick goal in the 61st minute. Later in the month, Barcelona went 0–1 down in the first half against Eintracht Frankfurt in Germany, before scoring three goals in the second half to win 3–1; Paralluelo netted a brace with the other goal scored by Caldentey for her 100th Barcelona goal, becoming the fifth player to achieve this number and the only player to score in the Champions League every season she has been with the club.

Barcelona concluded the month with a 4–0 away win against Athletic Club on 26 November, in a match where Caroline Graham Hansen got a goal and a hat-trick of assists, her third hat-trick of assists of the season. The next day, the GOAL 50 list was announced, of the 50 best footballers per website Goal; the list was then put to a public vote to name the Women's Player of the Year in December. Nine Barcelona players made the unranked list: Batlle, Bonmatí, Graham Hansen, Guijarro, León, Oshoala, Paralluelo, Rolfö, and Walsh.

=== December ===
The Catalan Football Federation (FCF) announced their awards for the previous season on 4 December, with Barcelona fully represented. The FCF crowned Bonmatí as the Best Women's Player, with Batlle (then with Manchester United) and Codina placing second and third respectively; María Pérez was named the Most Promising Women's Player, followed by Júlia Bartel and Meritxell Font. Barcelona's Nigerian forward Oshoala won the African Women's Footballer of the Year award, retaining the title to have been honoured for a record-extending sixth time, on 11 December. ESPN released its 2023 ranking of the best 50 women's footballers in the middle of December, with 13 Barcelona players featured and Bonmatí ranked number 1 nigh-unanimously by the experts.

The International Federation of Football History & Statistics (IFFHS) also released their annual rankings at the start of December, with Barcelona Femení being ranked the best club team in the world, and in UEFA. Nominations for the IFFHS awards were announced on 8 December, with the club receiving nominations for IFFHS World's Best Women Player, World's Best Youth Women's Player, World's Best Women Playmaker, World's Best Women Goalkeeper, and World's Best Women's Club Coach. At the end of the month, Bonmatí was announced as the winner of the IFFHS World's Best Player award for the year 2023, becoming the second Barcelona player to win the award after Putellas' wins in 2021 and 2022. Bonmatí was ranked first with 202 points, with teammates Paralluelo ranking second with 64 points and Caldentey ranking tenth with 8 points. In the other IFFHS awards, Bonmatí was named the Best Women's Playmaker on 199 points, with teammates Walsh in fourth (44 points) and Caldentey in eighth (24 points); Paralluelo won the Best Young Women's Player with 191 points, López placed sixth with 15 points while Dragoni and Brugts were joint-tenth with 6 points each; and Giráldez won the Best Women's Club Coach award with 180 points.

On 7 December, the club announced that centre back Paredes had a thigh muscle injury and would not be fit to play until the new year. Paredes had been out of training at Barcelona for several weeks due to a serious bacterial illness that left her weak, but was still called up to the Spain team; Barcelona had warned Spain that she should not play, but she was used anyway, with sports media being critical of how the national team seemed to lack player welfare and was not transparent about injuries. The next day, fellow centre back María León suffered a meniscus tear in training, set to be unavailable for several months following surgery, potentially until the end of the season. The injuries to the pair depleted the number of available defenders for Barcelona, as well as adding to a lengthy medical list for the club in general.

Barcelona recorded various goal achievements in December. They defeated Eibar 5–0 in their first match of December, during which Brugts scored an eight-minute hat-trick for her first Barcelona goals; Ariana Arias also scored her first senior goal for the club shortly after coming on; and Graham Hansen had opened scoring to become the team's joint top-scorer in all competitions in the season. In their next game, they got a 6–0 away win against Rosengård: scoring was opened with an own goal off Rosengård defender Jessica Wik, and the last goal was scored by Martina Fernández for her first senior goal for the club. Barcelona's fourth goal of the match, scored by Bonmatí in the 62nd minute, was the club's 200th goal in the UEFA Women's Champions League – Barcelona is the sixth team to reach this milestone. In the last league game of 2023, away against Costa Adeje Tenerife, Barcelona took a 2–0 victory thanks to goals from Graham Hansen and Walsh: Tenerife had reduced the dimensions of the Heliodoro pitch by five metres, in a move reported to be an attempt to stifle Barcelona's width within the legal limits of the league, and both the goals were scored in the second half. Graham Hansen converted a penalty to increase her large season goal involvement tally and Walsh scored her first and Barcelona's 50th league goal of the season, in her 50th appearance for the club; the shot was taken from inside the penalty area, something notable for Walsh.

On 14 December, sports media had reported that Giráldez would not continue as coach of Barcelona after the end of the season, adding that he had received a large offer from a team in the National Women's Soccer League (NWSL). Giráldez confirmed his departure in a press conference on 18 December. He then managed the team to his 100th victory in charge of them on 21 December, ending the year with a dominant 7–0 win over Rosengård in the return leg of their Champions League group stage fixture and qualifying for the quarter-finals with two games to spare. The first goal was from Walsh, surprisingly scoring in consecutive matches, and the seventh was an own goal from Wik, just as she had done in the previous match.

=== January ===
The shortlist for the FIFA FIFPro Women's World 11 was announced on 3 January 2024, with eight Barcelona players in the final 23: Bronze, León and Paredes as defenders, Bonmatí, Pina, Rolfö and Walsh as midfielders, and Paralluelo as a forward. The next day, the IFFHS published their Women's World Team 2023, in which the team was represented by two players: Bonmatí made her third consecutive appearance and Paralluelo made her first appearance in the selection. In other end of 2023 lists announced in January 2024, fifteen Barcelona players made them the most-featured club on the list of The 100 Best Female Footballers in the World, including six – Bonmatí at number 1, Paralluelo (3), Walsh (4), Rolfö (5), Graham Hansen (7), and León (8) – in the Top 10; and the club was the most-represented in the voting list for the EA Sports FC 24 Women's Team of the Year (TOTY), the inaugural women's TOTY in the franchise, with ten players nominated. The Best FIFA Football Awards were held on 15 January. Of Barcelona's major nominees, Bonmatí won The Best FIFA Women's Player for the year 2023, and also made her first appearance in the FIFA FIFPRO Women's World 11. Bronze and Walsh also featured in the Women's World 11, for their sixth and second appearances, respectively.

Barcelona got their first win of the new year on 6 January, defeating Levante Las Planas 9–1 in the league, matching their largest goal margin of the season. They then opened their Copa de la Reina campaign on 13 January – a 6–0 away win against Albacete with six different goalscorers, including Giulia Dragoni's first senior goal for the club – and began their Supercopa de España title defence on 17 January, defeating Real Madrid 4–0 in the semi-final for another Clásico victory. Barcelona won their first trophy of the season with the final of the Supercopa de España on 20 January, defeating Levante 7–0, including a hat-trick from Graham Hansen.

In the Champions League, the team defeated Eintracht Frankfurt 2–0 thanks to goals from Guijarro and Graham Hansen, and finished the month with a hard-fought 4–4 draw away against Benfica, ending their 23-match winning streak in all competitions. It was the first time Barcelona had conceded three goals in a match since a 1–3 loss to Bayern Munich in December 2022, and the first time they had conceded four goals in a match since a 3–4 loss to Atlético Madrid in June 2021. Bronze scored with the last touch of the match to equalise.

=== February ===
The first two days of February featured departure announcements. On 1 February, the club announced the immediate departure of Oshoala; her transfer to a team in the NWSL had been previously reported in the media, with Oshoala joining Bay FC for a fee of around €150,000. The next day, Paños announced that she would not renew her contract and therefore leave Barcelona at the end of the season.

The draw for the Champions League knockout stages was held on 6 February, with the full bracket to the final announced. As Barcelona finished top of their group, they were one of four seeded teams. They were drawn against Brann for the quarter-finals; it was soon announced that the first leg of the tie, with Brann at home, would be played at the Åsane Arena on 20 March, with the second leg to be played at the Estadi Johan Cruyff on 28 March. The draw decided that the winner on aggregate would advance to the semi-finals and play the winner of the tie between Chelsea and Ajax.

Graham Hansen scored Barcelona's 400th goal at the Johan Cruyff Stadium in a 4–0 victory over Sporting de Huelva in February, and Bonmatí scored Barcelona's 500th goal under the management of Giráldez when the team defeated Sevilla 8–0 to advance to the Copa de la Reina semi-finals. Barcelona played Sevilla again only three days later, this time in a league fixture, taking a 3–0 away win.

Barcelona's all-wins league record for the season was ended when they were held to a 1–1 draw against Levante on February 14, with the only goal for the team coming from Paralluelo. She almost scored a brace, finding the back of the net again in the second half, but this was controversially disallowed as the referee had blown the whistle as she struck the ball. The match was played at Barcelona's "fortress", home stadium Johan Cruyff; the stadium was opened in 2019 and the team had never dropped points there before, with 79 consecutive wins across all competitions (70 consecutive wins in the league). The draw was the first time Barcelona dropped points at home following 85 consecutive wins in all competitions, going back to a 2–3 loss in February 2019 (when they played at the Mini Estadi). It also marked the end of Graham Hansen's seven-match goalscoring streak.

=== March ===
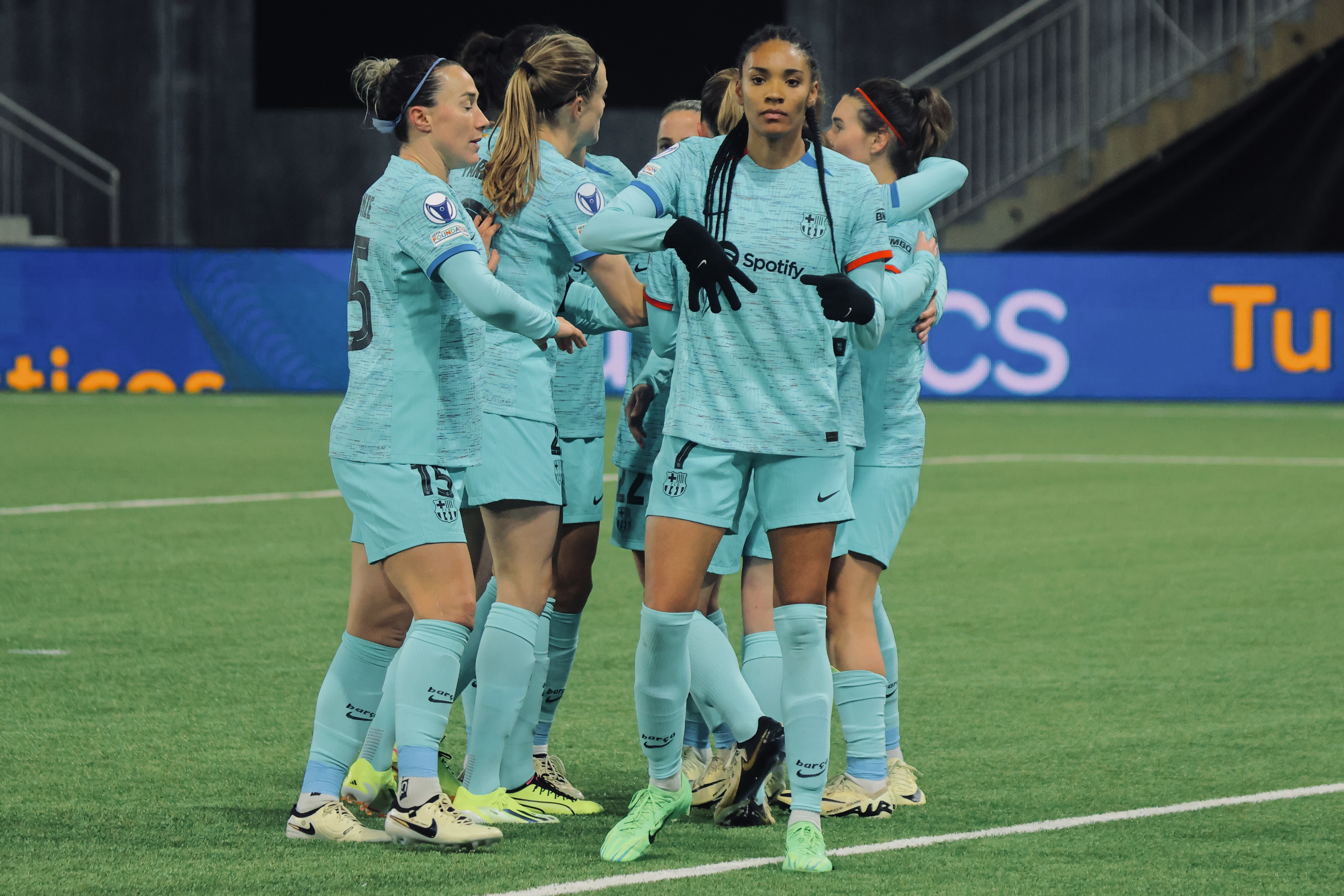
Paralluelo celebrating a goal against SK Brann

Barcelona started the month with a 3–0 away win over Athletic Club in the first leg of the Copa de la Reina semi-final on 7 March, before sealing their place in the Copa de la Reina final after winning 2–1 in the second leg a week later.

In the league, Barcelona started March with a 7–1 away victory against Real Sociedad: Paralluelo scored four goals in the game, including a free-kick goal for her hat-trick; and Putellas returned to action after 117 days out to score the last goal of the match, her 185th goal for the club, which saw her become the fifth-highest goalscorer in FC Barcelona's history (male or female), overtaking Josep Samitier. In the next fixture, they defeated Costa Adeje Tenerife 7–0, including Rolfö's first goal of the season after recently returning from her summer injury. On 24 March, Barcelona defeated Real Madrid 3–0 in the third El Clásico of the season and extended their lead at the top of the league table to twelve points with nine matches remaining.

Barcelona took a 2–1 away win against Brann in the first leg of the Champions League quarter-final on 20 March, with Ingrid Syrstad Engen making her 100th appearance for the club. They advanced to the Champions League semi-finals for the sixth consecutive season after defeating Brann 3–1 at home on 28 March. In this match, Guijarro reached 50 goals with the club. Barcelona's semi-final opponent was confirmed as Chelsea, in a rematch of the previous season's semi-final.

They ended the month with a 5–0 away win against Levante on 31 March. Both Vilamala and Paralluelo scored braces with the final goal coming from Martina Fernández. Even though the team had a busy schedule in March with eight matches across three competitions, they managed to win all of them, scoring 32 and conceding only 4 goals.

=== April ===
Putellas scored Barcelona's 100th league goal of the season on 13 April in a 5–1 win over Villarreal, and Pina reached 50 goals for the club on 24 April with a brace in the team's 4–2 away win at Levante Las Planas. On 22 April, Bonmatí became the first footballer to win the Laureus World Sports Award for Sportswoman of the Year, the second footballer to win an individual Laureus award after Lionel Messi.

In the Champions League, Barcelona suffered a 1–0 defeat against Chelsea on 20 April in the first leg of the Champions League semi-final in front of 36,428 fans at the Estadi Olímpic Lluís Companys. It was the team's first defeat of the season and their first home ground defeat in over five years, with their last home defeat being a 3–2 loss against Sporting de Huelva in February 2019. Barcelona failed to score for the first time since a 2–0 defeat against VfL Wolfsburg in April 2022, it was also the team's first Champions League home match without scoring since a 1–0 loss against Lyon in March 2018. Irene Paredes made her 100th appearance for the club. The deficit was overturned and the tie was won by Barcelona on 27 April, in a hard-fought 2–0 away win in front of 39,398 fans at Stamford Bridge, advancing 2–1 on aggregate to the Champions League final for the fifth overall and fourth consecutive season, thanks to goals from Bonmatí and Rolfö. With her goal, Bonmatí became the joint all-time top scorer in the Women's Champions League for Barcelona, tied with Putellas on 21 goals.

=== May ===
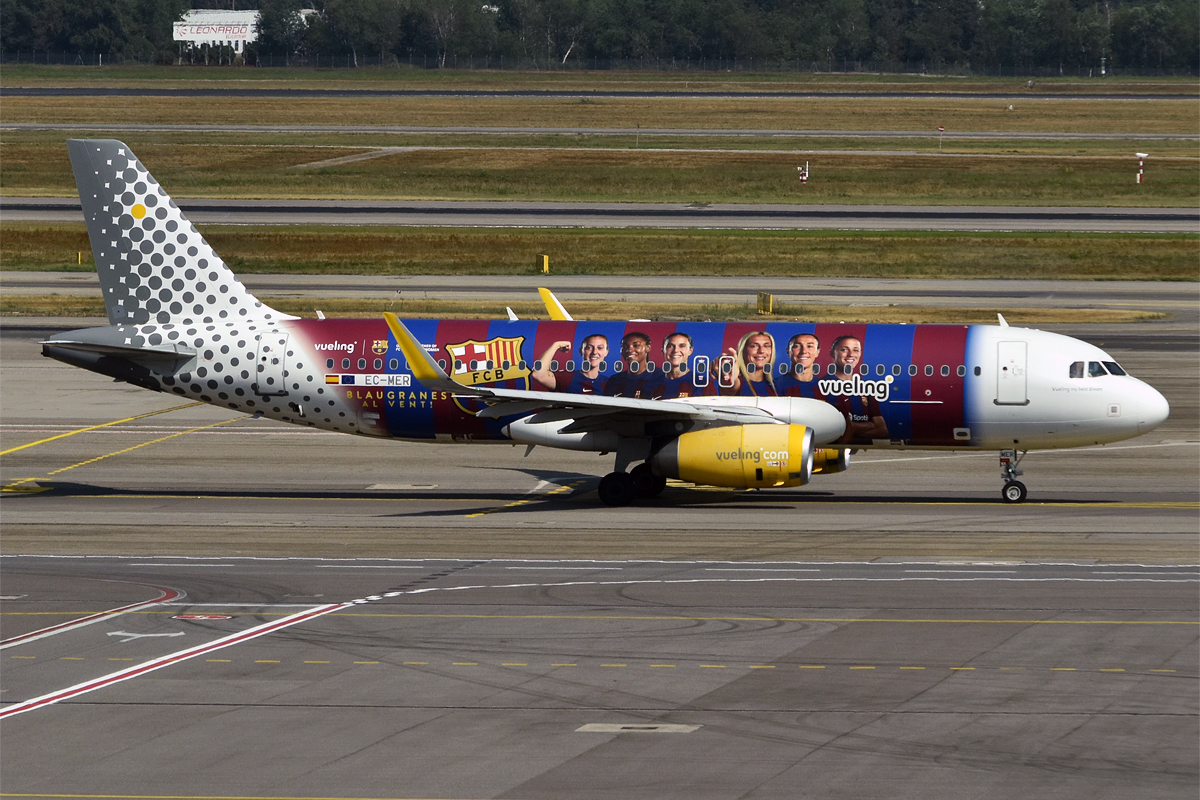
Barcelona Femení travelled to the Champions League final and other matches in a Vueling plane with livery depicting members of the team. Vueling's sponsorship was exclusive to the women's team: in April 2024, they had become the first European women's football team to have their own regular plane.

Barcelona put themselves one victory from winning the league with an 8–0 victory over Madrid CFF on 1 May, including a brace from defender Torrejón and Putellas' goal and three assists. Guijarro made her 300th, and Jana Fernández her 50th, appearances for the club. They then sealed the league title on 4 May, a 4–1 away win against Granada, for the fifth consecutive season and for the ninth time overall. Caldentey made her 300th appearance for Barcelona on 10 May, also scoring their 3,000th all-time league goal with her second goal (the sixth of the match) in the 7–0 victory over Athletic Club.

Caldentey was named player of the match when Barcelona completed the domestic treble on 18 May, defeating Real Sociedad 8–0 in the Copa de la Reina final to win a record tenth Copa de la Reina title in front of 25,617 spectators. Caldentey scored two and assisted three goals as Barcelona equalled the biggest ever win in a Copa de la Reina final.

Barcelona defeated their longstanding European rivals Lyon 2–0 in the Champions League final on 25 May in front of 50,827 spectators, defending the previous season's title and winning the Champions League for the third time overall. The victory completed their season's trophy haul by winning the continental treble for the second time and the continental quadruple for the first time in the club's history. The goals were scored by Bonmatí and Putellas, with Bonmatí also being named player of the match. The approximately 40,000 Barcelona fans that attended the match, many going to Bilbao in a flotilla of buses organised by the club, set a record for the largest travelling contingent in women's football; it was also the first Women's Champions League final with a UEFA Fan Zone. Large public screenings of the final were held in Plaça de Catalunya in Barcelona and in Mollet del Vallès, the hometown of Putellas.

UEFA then announced Bonmatí as the winner of the UEFA Women's Champions League Player of the Season for a record second time; joining Bonmatí in the UEFA Women's Champions League Team of the Season were also teammates Bronze, Paredes, Guijarro and Graham Hansen, with the club having the most players in the line-up. Oshoala was honored with the UEFA Women's Champions League Goal of the Season award for her bicycle kick against Benfica.

=== June ===
The team wrapped up the season with three games in one week in early June, defeating Real Betis 5–1 in the last home match of the season – Paños and Caldentey, who had announced her impending departure days earlier, played their last game for the club – and finishing the league undefeated with a 3–0 away win against Valencia. López made her 50th appearance for the club, and Graham Hansen scored to overtake Paralluelo as league topscorer and win the Pichichi award.

Between these two matches, Barcelona had travelled to Mexico for the 2024 Camp3onas Tour, defeating Guadalajara 4–1 in a friendly on 12 June.

== Players ==
=== First team ===
No.	Pos.	Nat.	Name	Age	EU	Since	App.	Goals	Ends	Notes
Goalkeepers
1	GK	(Spain)	Sandra Paños (3rd captain)	31	EU	2015	279	0	2024	
13	GK	(Spain)	Cata Coll	23	EU	2019	49	0	2026	
25	GK	(Spain)	Gemma Font	24	EU	2018	26	0	2025	Made in La Masia
Defenders
2	DF	(Spain)	Irene Paredes (5th captain)	32	EU	2021	106	9	2025	
4	DF	(Spain)	Mapi León	29	EU	2017	239	17	2026	
5	DF	(Spain)	Jana Fernández	22	EU	2018	55	3	2025	Made in La Masia
8	DF	(Spain)	Marta Torrejón (vice captain)	34	EU	2013	433	69	2025	
15	DF	(England)	Lucy Bronze	32	EU	2022	70	5	2024	
22	DF	(Spain)	Ona Batlle	25	EU	2023	39	7	2026	Made in La Masia
Midfielders
11	MF	(Spain)	Alexia Putellas (captain)	30	EU	2012	426	190	2026	Made in La Masia
12	MF	(Spain)	Patricia Guijarro (4th captain)	26	EU	2015	305	63	2027	
14	MF	(Spain)	Aitana Bonmatí	26	EU	2016	267	95	2025	Made in La Masia
21	MF	(England)	Keira Walsh	27	Non-EU	2022	77	3	2025	
23	MF	(Norway)	Ingrid Engen	26	EU	2021	110	6	2025	
24	MF	(Netherlands)	Esmee Brugts	20	EU	2023	40	7	2027	
Forwards
6	FW	(Spain)	Clàudia Pina	22	EU	2017	131	53	2026	Made in La Masia
7	FW	(Spain)	Salma Paralluelo	20	EU	2022	66	49	2026	
9	FW	(Spain)	Mariona Caldentey	28	EU	2014	303	115	2024	
10	FW	(Norway)	Caroline Graham Hansen	29	EU	2019	154	78	2026	
16	FW	(Sweden)	Fridolina Rolfö	30	EU	2021	91	32	2026	
19	FW	(Spain)	Bruna Vilamala	22	EU	2020	73	24	2026	Made in La Masia
First team players who left during the season
20	FW	(Nigeria)	Asisat Oshoala	29	EU	2019	162	117	2024	

- Source: FCBarcelona.com, LaLiga.com and UEFA.com
- Ordered by squad number.

=== Reserve team ===
Players from FC Barcelona Femení B and FC Barcelona Femení C who had a squad number and were eligible to play for the first team (those marked with an asterisk were in regular first team training).

As of 31 January 2024

N	Pos.	Nat.	Name	Age	EU	Since	App	Goals	Ends	Transfer fee	Notes
26	MF	(Italy)	Giulia Dragoni *	17	EU	2023	10	1	2025		
28	MF	(Spain)	Alba Caño	20	EU	2022	1	0	2026	Youth system	
30	MF	(Spain)	Vicky López *	17	EU	2022	50	11	2027	Youth system	
31	FW	(Spain)	Laia Martret	18	EU	2023	0	0	2026	Youth system	
32	FW	(Spain)	Ariana Arias	21	EU	2023	8	2	2027		
33	FW	(Spain)	Ona Baradad	20	EU	2021	13	1	2025		
34	DF	(Spain)	Martina Fernández *	19	EU	2022	27	3	2026	Youth system	
35	DF	(Spain)	Judit Pujols	19	EU	2022	1	0	2025	Youth system	
36	GK	(Spain)	Meritxell Muñoz	20	EU	2020	0	0	2024		
37	GK	(Spain)	Txell Font	19	EU	2022	0	0	2025	Youth system	
38	DF	(Spain)	Noah Bezis Ureña	18	EU	2023	0	0	2025	Youth system	
39	MF	(Spain)	Júlia Bartel	20	EU	2021	5	1	2025	Youth system	
40	FW	(Spain)	Lucía Corrales *	18	EU	2023	14	0	2026	Youth system	
41	DF	(Spain)	Aïcha Camara	17	EU	2023	0	0	2026	Youth system	
42	DF	(Spain)	Adriana Ranera	18	EU	2023	0	0	2026	Youth system	
43	DF	(Spain)	Martina González	16	EU	2023	0	0	2026	Youth system	
46	MF	(Norway)	Martine Fenger	17	EU	2023	0	0	2026		
47	MF	(Poland)	Emilia Szymczak	17	EU	2023	0	0	2026		

- Source: FCBarcelona.com, LaLiga.com and UEFA.com
- Ordered by squad number.

=== Contract renewals ===
No.	Pos.	Nat.	Name	Date	Until	Source
27	MF	(Spain)	María Pérez	7 June 2023	30 June 2025	
12	MF	(Spain)	Patricia Guijarro	6 October 2023	30 June 2027	
4	DF	(Spain)	Mapi León	21 December 2023	30 June 2026	
8	DF	(Spain)	Marta Torrejón	26 January 2024	30 June 2025	
25	GK	(Spain)	Gemma Font	16 May 2024	30 June 2025	
11	MF	(Spain)	Alexia Putellas	21 May 2024	30 June 2026	

== Transfers ==
=== In ===
No.	Pos.	Nat.	Player	Moving from	Type	Fee	Source
Summer
22	DF	(Spain)	Ona Batlle	(England) Manchester United	Transfer	Free	
24	MF	(Netherlands)	Esmee Brugts	(Netherlands) PSV Eindhoven	Transfer	Free	

=== Out ===
No.	Pos.	Nat.	Player	Moving to	Type	Fee	Source
Summer
25	DF	(Spain)	Emma Ramírez	Real Sociedad	Contract termination	Free agent	
22	DF	(Spain)	Nuria Rábano	(Germany) VfL Wolfsburg	Contract termination	Free agent	
18	FW	(Brazil)	Geyse	(England) Manchester United	Transfer	€300,000	
3	DF	(Spain)	Laia Codina	(England) Arsenal	Transfer	€100,000	
27	MF	(Spain)	María Pérez	Sevilla	Loan		
7	DF	(Switzerland)	Ana-Maria Crnogorčević	Atlético Madrid	Transfer	Undisclosed	
Winter
29	DF	(Spain)	Berta Doltra	Atlético Baleares	Transfer	Undisclosed	
20	FW	(Nigeria)	Asisat Oshoala	(United States) Bay FC	Transfer	€150,000	
Total				€550,000			

=== Transfer summary ===
Undisclosed fees are not included in the transfer totals.

Expenditure ▼

Summer: €000,000

Winter: €000,000

Total expenditure: €000,000

Income ▲

Summer: €400,000

Winter: €150,000

Total income: €550,000

Net totals

Summer: ▲€400,000

Winter: ▲€150,000

Total: ▲€550,000

== Pre-season and friendlies ==
Win Draw Loss Fixtures

12 August 2023 Friendly	Barcelona (Spain)	3–0	(Spain) AEM Lleida	Sant Joan Despí, Spain
13:00 CEST (UTC+2)	Pina 20'; Arias 45'; Fenger 47'	Report		Stadium: Ciutat Esportiva Joan Gamper – Field 7
Note: The match was played behind closed doors.

19 August 2023 Friendly	Barcelona (Spain)	2–0	(France) Montpellier	Sant Joan Despí, Spain
19:00 CEST (UTC+2)	Caño 1'; Martret 89'	Report		Stadium: Estadi Johan Cruyff; Attendance: 2,943; Referee: Ylenia Sánchez Miguel (Spain)

24 August 2023 Joan Gamper Trophy	Barcelona (Spain)	5–0	(Italy) Juventus	Sant Joan Despí, Spain
19:00 CEST (UTC+2)	Hansen 5'; Lenzini 33' (o.g.); Vilamala 35'; Vicky López 41'; Dragoni (yellow card) 72'; Mapi León 76'	Report		Stadium: Estadi Johan Cruyff; Attendance: 5,485; Referee: Ainara Andrea Acevedo Dudley (Spain); MVP: Mapi León

29 August 2023 Camp3onas Tour friendly	Club América (Mexico)	0–2	(Spain) Barcelona	Mexico City, Mexico
20:00 CT (UTC-5)		Report	Pina (yellow card) 37', (goal) 44'; Judit 90+3'	Stadium: Estadio Azteca; Attendance: 34,931; Referee: Francia María González Martínez (Mexico); MVP: Clàudia Pina

1 September 2023 Camp3onas Tour friendly	Tigres UANL (Mexico)	0–1	(Spain) Barcelona	Monterrey, Mexico
20:00 CT (UTC-5)	Reyes (yellow card) 36'; Gutiérrez (yellow card) 56'	Report	Pina 18'	Stadium: Estadio Universitario; Attendance: 39,501; Referee: Lizzet Amairany García Olvera (Mexico); MVP: Clàudia Pina

4 April 2024 Friendly	Barcelona (Spain)	7–0	Paraguay	Sant Joan Despí, Spain
11:15 CEST (UTC+2)	Guijarro; Pina; Ortega; Parada; ?; ?	Sport.es; APF.org.py		Stadium: Ciutat Esportiva Joan Gamper – Field 7
Note: The match was played behind closed doors.

12 June 2024 Camp3onas Tour friendly	Guadalajara (Mexico)	1–4	(Spain) Barcelona	Guadalajara, Mexico
20:00 CT (UTC-5)	Jaramillo (yellow card) 41'; Guzmán 77' (pen.)	Report	Arias 50'; Guijarro 61'; Pina 73', 90', (yellow card) 85'	Stadium: Estadio Akron; Attendance: 30,000; Referee: Katia Itzel García (Mexico); MVP: Clàudia Pina

== Competitions ==
=== Overall record ===
Competition	First match	Last match	Starting round	Final position	Record							
Competition	First match	Last match	Starting round	Final position	Pld	W	D	L	GF	GA	GD	Win %
Liga F	16 September 2023 (Note: Matchday 2 was played on 16 September 2023, before Matchday 1 (first scheduled for 10 September 2023, rescheduled for 5 October 2023) due to players' strike.)	16 June 2024	Matchday 1	Winners	30	29	1	0	137	10	+127	96.67
Copa de la Reina	13 January 2024	18 May 2024	Round of 16	Winners	5	5	0	0	27	1	+26	100.00
Supercopa de España Femenina	17 January 2024	20 January 2024	Semi-finals	Winners	2	2	0	0	11	0	+11	100.00
UEFA Women's Champions League	14 November 2023	25 May 2024	Group stage	Winners	11	9	1	1	36	8	+28	81.82
Total					48	45	2	1	211	19	+192	93.75

Source: Competitions

Competition won

=== Liga F ===
==== League table ====
Pos	Team	Pld	W	D	L	GF	GA	GD	Pts	Qualification or relegation
1	Barcelona (C)	30	29	1	0	137	10	+127	88	Qualification for the Champions League group stage
2	Real Madrid	30	24	1	5	74	33	+41	73	Qualification for the Champions League second round
3	Atlético de Madrid	30	18	7	5	53	22	+31	61	Qualification for the Champions League first round
4	Levante	30	17	9	4	59	28	+31	60	
5	Athletic Club	30	17	2	11	38	37	+1	53	

Source: Liga F
Rules for classification: 1) Points; 2) Head-to-head points; 3) Goal difference; 4) Number of goals scored
(C) Champions

==== Results summary ====
Overall								Home						Away					
Pld	W	D	L	GF	GA	GD	Pts	W	D	L	GF	GA	GD	W	D	L	GF	GA	GD
30	29	1	0	137	10	+127	88	14	1	0	81	5	+76	15	0	0	56	5	+51

Source: La Liga

==== Results by round ====
Round	2	3	1^{1}	4	5	6	7	8	9	10	11	12	13	15	16	17	14^{2}	18	19	20	21	22	23	24	25	26	27	28	29	30
Ground	A	A	H	H	A	H	H	A	H	A	H	A	H	A	H	A	H	H	A	H	A	A	H	A	H	A	H	A	H	A
Result	W	W	W	W	W	W	W	W	W	W	W	W	W	W	W	W	D	W	W	W	W	W	W	W	W	W	W	W	W	W
Position	2	1	1	1	1	1	1	1	1	1	1	1	1	1	1	1	1	1	1	1	1	1	1	1	1	1	1	1	1	1

Source: La Liga
A = Away; H = Home; W = Win; D = Draw; L = Loss; P = Postponed
Notes:
- ^{1} Matchday 1 (vs Valencia) was originally scheduled for 10 September 2023, but was postponed due to Liga F players' strike.
- ^{2} Matchday 14 (vs Levante) was originally scheduled for 21 January 2024, but was postponed due to both teams' involvement in the Supercopa de España.

==== Matches ====
16 September 2023 2	Madrid CFF	0–2	Barcelona	Fuenlabrada
19:00 CEST (UTC+2)		Report	Hansen 40'; Bronze (yellow card) 61'; Oshoala 84'	Stadium: Estadio Fernando Torres; Attendance: 1,073; Referee: Patricia Luna Varo

1 October 2023 3	Sporting de Huelva	1–2	Barcelona	Huelva
19:00 CEST (UTC+2)	Ballesté 90+6'	Report	Pina 24'; Putellas (penalty missed) 79'; Carol 90+2' (o.g.)	Stadium: Estadio Nuevo Colombino; Attendance: 5,141; Referee: Beatriz Cuesta Arribas

5 October 2023 1	Barcelona	6–0	Valencia	Sant Joan Despí
20:00 CEST (UTC+2)	Florentino 9', 21' (o.g.); Bonmatí 43'; Mapi León 61'; Putellas 63' (pen.); Torrejón 74'	Report	Chacón (yellow card) 58'	Stadium: Estadi Johan Cruyff; Attendance: 2,885; Referee: Paola Cebollada López
Note: Opening match was originally scheduled for 10 September 2023, but was postponed due to Liga F players' strike.

8 October 2023 4	Barcelona	3–0	Real Sociedad	Sant Joan Despí
18:30 CEST (UTC+2)	Hansen 8', 84'; Putellas 51'; Bronze (yellow card) 90+3'	Report	Eizagirre (yellow card) 41'	Stadium: Estadi Johan Cruyff; Attendance: 5,167; Referee: Amy Peñalver Pearce

15 October 2023 5	Atlético Madrid	0–1	Barcelona	Alcalá de Henares
18:30 CEST (UTC+2)	Majarín (yellow card) 45+1'; Santos (yellow card) 65'; Navarro (yellow card) 90+1'	Report	Putellas 51'	Stadium: Centro Deportivo Wanda Alcalá de Henares; Attendance: 2,700; Referee: Zulema González González

21 October 2023 6	Barcelona	6–1	Granada	Sant Joan Despí
18:30 CEST (UTC+2)	Guijarro 6'; Batlle 29'; Paralluelo 59'; Caldentey 66'; Oshoala 80', 82'	Report	Gómez (yellow card) 58'; Pérez 90+3'	Stadium: Estadi Johan Cruyff; Attendance: 4,653; Referee: Elia María Martínez Martínez

5 November 2023 7	Barcelona	8–0	Sevilla	Sant Joan Despí
16:00 CET (UTC+1)	Paralluelo 7', 17', 37', 39'; Caldentey 48', 54'; Hansen 57'; Torrejón 90+1'	Report	González (yellow card) 28'; Rodríguez (yellow card) 34'	Stadium: Estadi Johan Cruyff; Attendance: 5,083; Referee: Arantza Gallastegui Pérez

11 November 2023 8	Villarreal	0–6	Barcelona	Villarreal
16:30 CET (UTC+1)		Report	Bonmatí 14', 50'; Oshoala 24', 85'; Paralluelo 77'; Hansen 82'	Stadium: Ciudad Deportiva Pamesa Cerámica; Attendance: 3,157; Referee: Andrea Fírvida Fernández

19 November 2023 9	Barcelona	5–0	Real Madrid	Barcelona
12:00 CET (UTC+1)	Bonmatí 17'; Hansen 43'; Caldentey 45+1'; Torrejón (yellow card) 78'; Pina 90+1'; Vicky López 90+3'	Report		Stadium: Estadi Olímpic Lluís Companys; Attendance: 38,707; Referee: María Eugenia Gil Soriano

26 November 2023 10	Athletic Bilbao	0–4	Barcelona	Lezama
18:00 CET (UTC+1)	Zugasti (yellow card) 16'	Report	Torrejón 36'; Hansen 54'; Guijarro 87'; Bonmatí 90+2'	Stadium: Lezama (Field 2); Attendance: 2,810; Referee: Paola Cebollada López

9 December 2023 11	Barcelona	5–0	Eibar	Sant Joan Despí
16:30 CET (UTC+1)	Hansen 57'; Brugts 58', 61', 66'; Arias 88'	Report		Stadium: Estadi Johan Cruyff; Attendance: 5,150; Referee: Elisabeth Calvo Valentín

17 December 2023 12	Costa Adeje Tenerife	0–2	Barcelona	Santa Cruz de Tenerife
12:00 CET (UTC+1)		Report	Hansen 49' (pen.); Walsh 62'	Stadium: Estadio Heliodoro Rodríguez López; Attendance: 9,053; Referee: Amy Peñalver Pearce

6 January 2024 13	Barcelona	9–1	Levante Las Planas	Sant Joan Despí
18:30 CET (UTC+1)	Paralluelo 5'; Caldentey 23' (pen.); Bonmatí 28'; Hansen 41'; Pina 50'; Guijarro 51', 90+2'; Vicky López 84'; Oshoala 90+3'	Report	Simon (yellow card) 22'; Poljak 63'	Stadium: Estadi Johan Cruyff; Attendance: 5,070; Referee: Alicia Espinosa Ríos

28 January 2024 15	Real Betis	0–6	Barcelona	Seville
14:00 CET (UTC+1)	Núñez (yellow card) 32'; Quiles (yellow card) 85'; Vizoso (yellow card) 90+1'	Report	Vilamala 3'; Brugts 23'; Hansen 30', 51'; Vicky López 42'; Bonmatí 75'	Stadium: Ciudad Deportiva Luis del Sol; Attendance: 2,320; Referee: María Gloria Planes Terol

4 February 2024 16	Barcelona	4–0	Sporting de Huelva	Sant Joan Despí
18:00 CET (UTC+1)	Pina 20', 26' (pen.); Paredes (yellow card) 35'; Hansen 77'; Brugts 90+3'	Report	Ojeda (yellow card) 11'	Stadium: Estadi Johan Cruyff; Attendance: 3,898; Referee: Elia María Martínez Martínez

10 February 2024 17	Sevilla	0–3	Barcelona	Seville
18:30 CET (UTC+1)		Report	Pina 18'; Hansen 71'; Caldentey 73'	Stadium: Estadio Jesús Navas; Attendance: 1,158; Referee: Paola Cebollada López

14 February 2024 14	Barcelona	1–1	Levante	Sant Joan Despí
18:00 CET (UTC+1)	Paralluelo 21'	Report	Redondo 55'	Stadium: Estadi Johan Cruyff; Attendance: 3,125; Referee: Beatriz Cuesta Arribas
Note: The match was originally scheduled for 21 January 2024, but was postponed due to both teams' involvement in the Supercopa de España: Barcelona defeated Levante in the final of the Supercopa on 20 January 2024.

18 February 2024 18	Barcelona	2–0	Atlético Madrid	Sant Joan Despí
13:30 CET (UTC+1)	Paralluelo 39'; Bronze (yellow card) 44'; Vicky López 76'	Report	Crnogorčević (yellow card) 54'	Stadium: Estadi Johan Cruyff; Attendance: 5,289; Referee: Olatz Rivera Olmedo

10 March 2024 19	Real Sociedad	1–7	Barcelona	San Sebastián
14:00 CET (UTC+1)	Sarriegi 82'	Report	Paredes (yellow card) 8'; Vicky López 18'; Paralluelo 22', 24', 44', 51'; Hansen 57'; Putellas 81'	Stadium: Instalaciones de Zubieta; Attendance: 1,121; Referee: Andrea Fírvida Fernández

17 March 2024 20	Barcelona	7–0	Costa Adeje Tenerife	Sant Joan Despí
14:00 CET (UTC+1)	Rolfö 8'; Pina 14', 34'; Hansen 21'; Putellas 41'; Torrejón 43'; Vicky López (yellow card) 51'; Monday 69' (o.g.); M. Fernández (yellow card) 80'	Report	Natalia Ramos (yellow card) 26'	Stadium: Estadi Johan Cruyff; Attendance: 4,919; Referee: Patricia Luna Varo

24 March 2024 21	Real Madrid	0–3	Barcelona	Madrid
18:00 CET (UTC+1)	Athenea (yellow card) 19'	Report	Rolfö 10'; Bonmatí 55'; Hansen 67'; Brugts (yellow card) 78'	Stadium: Estadio Alfredo Di Stéfano; Attendance: 4,952; Referee: Olatz Rivera Olmedo

31 March 2024 22	Levante	0–5	Barcelona	Valencia
18:00 CEST (UTC+2)		Report	Vilamala 4', 49'; Paralluelo 34', 52'; M. Fernández 67'	Stadium: Estadi Ciutat de València; Attendance: 10,834; Referee: Marta Huerta de Aza

13 April 2024 23	Barcelona	5–1	Villarreal	Sant Joan Despí
18:30 CEST (UTC+2)	Pina 33'; Guijarro (yellow card) 58'; Rolfö 63'; Putellas 70' (pen.); Paralluelo 74', 82'	Report	McKenna 55'	Stadium: Estadi Johan Cruyff; Attendance: 5,149; Referee: Andrea Fírvida Fernández

24 April 2024 24	Levante Las Planas	2–4	Barcelona	Sant Joan Despí
18:00 CEST (UTC+2)	Poljak 10'; Uribe 19'; Serrano (yellow card) 73'	Report	Pina 12', 30'; Torrejón 34'; Mora 45+1' (o.g.); M. Fernández (yellow card) 75'	Stadium: Municipal de Les Planes; Attendance: 1,300; Referee: Beatriz Cuesta Arribas
Note: The match was originally scheduled for 21 April 2024, but was postponed due to Barcelona's Champions League semi-final first leg match.

1 May 2024 25	Barcelona	8–0	Madrid CFF	Sant Joan Despí
18:00 CEST (UTC+2)	Putellas 7'; Caldentey 15'; Pina 33'; Vicky López 44'; Brugts 45'; Torrejón 48', 86'; Batlle 90+2'	Report	Laurita (yellow card) 65'	Stadium: Estadi Johan Cruyff; Attendance: 5,227; Referee: Paola Cebollada López
Note: The match was originally scheduled for 28 April 2024, but was postponed due to Barcelona's Champions League semi-final second leg match.

4 May 2024 26	Granada	1–4	Barcelona	Granada
20:30 CEST (UTC+2)	Lauri (yellow card) 20'; L. Pérez 45+2' (pen.), (yellow card) 49'	Report	Rolfö 2', 75' (pen.); Bronze 11'; Paralluelo (yellow card) 17'; Hansen 28'; Paredes (yellow card) 78'	Stadium: Nuevo Estadio de Los Cármenes; Attendance: 7,000; Referee: María Gloria Planes Terol

10 May 2024 27	Barcelona	7–0	Athletic Bilbao	Sant Joan Despí
20:30 CEST (UTC+2)	Caldentey 9' (pen.), 68'; Vilamala 18'; Vicky López 30', 59'; Brugts 56'; Batlle 74'	Report		Stadium: Estadi Johan Cruyff; Attendance: 5,050; Referee: Elena Peláez Arnillas

14 May 2024 28	Eibar	0–4	Barcelona	Eibar
18:00 CEST (UTC+2)	Jujuba (yellow card) 82'	Report	Paralluelo 16'; Torrejón 20'; Hansen 38'; Putellas 71'	Stadium: Ipurua; Attendance: 1,440; Referee: Raquel Suárez González

9 June 2024 29	Barcelona	5–1	Real Betis	Sant Joan Despí
20:30 CEST (UTC+2)	Pina (yellow card) 15', (goal) 26'; Caldentey 44' (pen.); Hansen 75'; Paralluelo 88', 90+1'	Report	Perea (yellow card) 10'; Aguado 45'	Stadium: Estadi Johan Cruyff; Attendance: 5,162; Referee: Elia María Martínez Martínez

16 June 2024 30	Valencia	0–3	Barcelona	Paterna
12:00 CEST (UTC+2)	López (yellow card) 27'; Portales (yellow card) 87'	Report	G. Font (yellow card) 8'; J. Fernández (yellow card) 42'; Vicky López 50'; Guijarro 68'; Hansen 88'	Stadium: Estadio Antonio Puchades; Attendance: 1,420; Referee: Patricia Luna Varo

Source: La Liga

=== Copa de la Reina ===
Barcelona entered the competition in the Round of 16, where they defeated Albacete 0–6 to advance to the quarter-finals. In the quarter-final, they defeated Sevilla 8–0 and advanced to the semi-finals. Barcelona advanced to the Copa de la Reina final after they defeated Athletic Club 5–1 on aggregate in the semi-finals. Barcelona won their tenth Copa de la Reina after they defeated Real Sociedad 8–0 in the final, completing the domestic treble.

13 January 2024 Round of 16	Albacete	0–6	Barcelona	Albacete
12:00 CET (UTC+1)	Peña (yellow card) 42'	Report	Dragoni 20'; Fernández 35'; Oshoala 37'; Batlle 55'; Pina 78'; Caldentey 85'	Stadium: Ciudad Deportiva Andrés Iniesta; Attendance: 4,790; Referee: Andrea Fírvida Fernández

7 February 2024 Quarter-finals	Barcelona	8–0	Sevilla	Sant Joan Despí
19:30 CET (UTC+1)	Paralluelo 6', 37'; Bonmatí 16', 58'; Caldentey 18', 33' (pen.); Hansen 40'; Coll (yellow card) 44'; Arias 77'	Report	Mérida (yellow card) 71'	Stadium: Estadi Johan Cruyff; Attendance: 3,438; Referee: Alicia Espinosa Ríos

7 March 2024 Semi-finals – First leg	Athletic Club	0–3	Barcelona	Bilbao
19:00 CET (UTC+1)	Zubieta (yellow card) 83'	Report	Bonmatí 14', 16'; Hansen (yellow card) 64'; Paralluelo 78'	Stadium: San Mamés; Attendance: 23,490; Referee: Elisabeth Calvo Valentín

14 March 2024 Semi-finals – Second leg	Barcelona	2–1 (5–1 agg.)	Athletic Club	Sant Joan Despí
21:00 CET (UTC+1)	Caldentey 19'; Guijarro 72'; Brugts (yellow card) 87'	Report	Uriarte (yellow card) 45+1'; Pinedo 63'	Stadium: Estadi Johan Cruyff; Attendance: 5,225; Referee: Zulema González González

18 May 2024 Final	Real Sociedad	0–8	Barcelona	Zaragoza
19:00 CEST (UTC+2)		Report	Batlle 5', 33'; Paralluelo 13'; Hansen 19', 26'; Caldentey 48', 58'; Pina 52'	Stadium: La Romareda; Attendance: 25,617; Referee: María Eugenia Gil Soriano; MVP: Mariona Caldentey

=== Supercopa de España Femenina ===
The draw for the competition was held on 29 December 2023. Barcelona started their Supercopa defense against Real Madrid on 17 January 2024, in the second Women's Clásico of the season, where they won 4–0 and advanced to the final. In the final, they defeated Levante 7–0 to win the Supercopa for the third consecutive season and fourth time overall.

17 January 2024 Semi-final	Barcelona	4–0	Real Madrid	Leganés
19:00 CET (UTC+1)	Caldentey 12', 39' (pen.); Paralluelo 15', 52'	Report		Stadium: Estadio Municipal de Butarque; Attendance: 7,000; Referee: Marta Huerta de Aza

20 January 2024 Final	Levante	0–7	Barcelona	Leganés
20:00 CET (UTC+1)	Tomás (yellow card) 45'; Baños (yellow card) 50'	Report	Paralluelo 12', 45+2'; Hansen 24', 36', 54'; Batlle 26'; Bonmatí 57'	Stadium: Estadio Municipal de Butarque; Attendance: 7,139; Referee: Olatz Rivera Olmedo; MVP: Caroline Graham Hansen

=== UEFA Women's Champions League ===
==== Group stage ====
Pos	Team	Pld	W	D	L	GF	GA	GD	Pts	Qualification	BAR	BEN	FRA	ROS
1	(Spain) Barcelona	6	5	1	0	27	5	+22	16	Advance to quarter-finals	—	5–0	2–0	7–0
2	(Portugal) Benfica	6	2	3	1	9	12	−3	9	Advance to quarter-finals	4–4	—	1–0	1–0
3	(Germany) Eintracht Frankfurt	6	2	1	3	9	8	+1	7		1–3	1–1	—	5–0
4	(Sweden) Rosengård	6	0	1	5	3	23	−20	1		0–6	2–2	1–2	—

Source: UEFA
Rules for classification: Group stage tiebreakers

14 November 2023 1	Barcelona (Spain)	5–0	(Portugal) Benfica	Sant Joan Despí, Spain
21:00 CET (UTC+1)	Putellas 15', 39'; Bonmatí 44', 52'; Oshoala 61'	Report	Amado (yellow card) 35'; Alves (yellow card) 65'	Stadium: Estadi Johan Cruyff; Attendance: 4,536; Referee: Lina Lehtovaara (Finland)

22 November 2023 2	Eintracht Frankfurt (Germany)	1–3	(Spain) Barcelona	Frankfurt, Germany
21:00 CET (UTC+1)	Freigang 43'	Report	Paralluelo 48', 62'; Caldentey 59', (yellow card) 67'; Batlle (yellow card) 68'	Stadium: Frankfurt Stadion; Attendance: 16,100; Referee: Jana Adámková (Czech Republic)

13 December 2023 3	Rosengård (Sweden)	0–6	(Spain) Barcelona	Malmö, Sweden
18:45 CET (UTC+1)	Jansson (yellow card) 31'	Report	Wik 16' (o.g.); Paralluelo 37'; Guijarro 44'; Bonmatí 62'; Caldentey 73' (pen.); Fernández 90+2'	Stadium: Malmö IP; Attendance: 4,122; Referee: Monika Mularczyk (Poland)

21 December 2023 4	Barcelona (Spain)	7–0	(Sweden) Rosengård	Sant Joan Despí, Spain
21:00 CET (UTC+1)	Walsh 15'; Hansen 34'; Paralluelo 54', 60'; Pina 73'; Torrejón 75'; Wik 85' (o.g.)	Report		Stadium: Estadi Johan Cruyff; Attendance: 5,072; Referee: Eleni Antoniou (Greece)

25 January 2024 5	Barcelona (Spain)	2–0	(Germany) Eintracht Frankfurt	Sant Joan Despí, Spain
21:00 CET (UTC+1)	Guijarro 19'; Hansen 73'	Report	Gräwe (yellow card) 62'	Stadium: Estadi Johan Cruyff; Attendance: 4,842; Referee: Deborah Anex (Switzerland)

31 January 2024 6	Benfica (Portugal)	4–4	(Spain) Barcelona	Seixal, Portugal
21:00 CET (UTC+1)	Alidou 26', 45'; Seiça (yellow card) 41'; Costa (yellow card) 70'; J. Silva 71'; Bronze 81' (o.g.)	Report	Hansen 18', 54'; Guijarro 20'; Batlle (yellow card) 79'; Bronze 90+6'	Stadium: Benfica Campus; Attendance: 2,307; Referee: Emanuela Rusta (Albania)

==== Knockout phase ====
===== Quarter-finals =====
20 March 2024 First leg	Brann (Norway)	1–2	(Spain) Barcelona	Bergen, Norway
21:00 CET (UTC+1)	Kvamme 39'; Engesvik (yellow card) 45+1'; Tynnilä (yellow card) 74'	Report	Hansen 9'; Paralluelo 72'	Stadium: Åsane Arena; Attendance: 3,300; Referee: Alina Peşu (Romania)

28 March 2024 Second leg	Barcelona (Spain)	3–1 (5–2 agg.)	(Norway) Brann	Sant Joan Despí, Spain
18:45 CET (UTC+1)	Bonmatí 24'; Rolfö 56'; Paredes (yellow card) 62'; Guijarro 88'	Report	Stenevik (yellow card) 61'; Svendheim 70'	Stadium: Estadi Johan Cruyff; Attendance: 5,510; Referee: Ivana Martinčić (Croatia)
Note: Barcelona won 5–2 on aggregate.

===== Semi-finals =====
20 April 2024 First leg	Barcelona (Spain)	0–1	(England) Chelsea	Barcelona, Spain
13:30 CEST (UTC+2)	Guijarro (yellow card) 79'; Paredes (yellow card) 83'	Report	Cuthbert 40'	Stadium: Estadi Olímpic Lluís Companys; Attendance: 36,428; Referee: Stéphanie Frappart (France)

27 April 2024 Second leg	Chelsea (England)	0–2 (1–2 agg.)	(Spain) Barcelona	Fulham, England
18:30 CEST (UTC+2)	Buchanan (yellow card) 54' (yellow-red card) 59'; Charles (yellow card) 87'	Report	Bonmatí 25'; Rolfö 75' (pen.); Paralluelo (yellow card) 87'	Stadium: Stamford Bridge; Attendance: 39,398; Referee: Iuliana Demetrescu (Romania)
Note: Barcelona won 2–1 on aggregate.

===== Final =====
25 May 2024 Final	Barcelona (Spain)	2–0	(France) Lyon	Bilbao
18:00 CEST (UTC+2)	Bonmatí 63'; Putellas 90+5', (yellow card) 90+6'	Report	Renard (yellow card) 70'; Endler (yellow card) 90+7'	Stadium: San Mamés; Attendance: 50,827; Referee: Rebecca Welch (England); MVP: Aitana Bonmatí

== Statistics ==
=== Overall ===
As of last matchday.

No..	Pos.	Nat.	Player	Liga F		Copa de la Reina		Supercopa de España		Champions League		Total		Discipline		Notes
No..	Pos.	Nat.	Player	Apps	Goals	Apps	Goals	Apps	Goals	Apps	Goals	Apps	Goals	Yellow card	Red card	Notes
Goalkeepers
1	GK	(Spain)	Sandra Paños	14	0	3	0	0	0	3	0	20	0	0	0	
13	GK	(Spain)	Cata Coll	15	0	1	0	2	0	7	0	25	0	1	0	
25	GK	(Spain)	Gemma Font	1+1	0	1	0	0	0	1	0	4	0	1	0	
Defenders
2	DF	(Spain)	Irene Paredes	15+4	0	4	0	2	0	6	0	31	0	5	0	
4	DF	(Spain)	Mapi León	8+2	1	0	0	0	0	2	0	12	1	0	0	
5	DF	(Spain)	Jana Fernández	7+2	0	0	0	0	0	0	0	9	0	1	0	
8	DF	(Spain)	Marta Torrejón	18+10	8	2+2	0	0	0	4+3	1	39	9	1	0	
15	DF	(England)	Lucy Bronze	16+5	1	4+1	0	2	0	8+2	1	38	2	3	0	
22	DF	(Spain)	Ona Batlle	19+3	3	5	3	2	1	9+1	0	39	7	2	0	
34	DF	(Spain)	Martina Fernández	13+2	1	1	1	0+2	0	1+3	1	22	3	2	0	
35	DF	(Spain)	Judit Pujols	0	0	0	0	0	0	0+1	0	1	0	0	0	
Midfielders
11	MF	(Spain)	Alexia Putellas	13+6	8	0+2	0	0	0	2+4	3	27	11	1	0	
12	MF	(Spain)	Patricia Guijarro	20+3	5	4+1	1	2	0	8+2	4	40	10	2	0	
14	MF	(Spain)	Aitana Bonmatí	18+6	8	4	4	2	1	11	6	41	19	0	0	
21	MF	(England)	Keira Walsh	14+9	1	2+1	0	2	0	11	1	39	2	0	0	
23	MF	(Norway)	Ingrid Engen	14+8	0	4+1	0	2	0	11	0	40	0	0	0	
24	MF	(Netherlands)	Esmee Brugts	19+8	7	1+3	0	0+1	0	3+5	0	40	7	2	0	
26	MF	(Italy)	Giulia Dragoni	0+6	0	1+2	1	0	0	0+1	0	10	1	0	0	
30	MF	(Spain)	Vicky López	14+9	9	2+2	0	0+2	0	0+8	0	37	9	1	0	
39	MF	(Spain)	Júlia Bartel	1	0	0	0	0	0	0+1	0	2	0	0	0	
Forwards
6	FW	(Spain)	Clàudia Pina	22+7	13	4	2	0+2	0	1+8	1	44	16	1	0	
7	FW	(Spain)	Salma Paralluelo	14+5	20	3+1	4	2	4	9+2	6	36	34	2	0	
9	FW	(Spain)	Mariona Caldentey	14+14	10	4+1	6	2	2	10+1	2	46	20	1	0	
10	FW	(Norway)	Caroline Graham Hansen	19+6	21	3	3	2	3	10	5	40	32	1	0	
16	FW	(Sweden)	Fridolina Rolfö	5+2	5	0+3	0	0	0	4+1	2	15	7	0	0	
19	FW	(Spain)	Bruna Vilamala	10+11	4	1+3	0	0+1	0	0+3	0	29	4	0	0	
32	FW	(Spain)	Ariana Arias	1+4	1	0+1	1	0	0	0+1	0	7	2	0	0	
40	FW	(Spain)	Lucía Corrales	4+6	0	0+1	0	0	0	0+1	0	12	0	0	0	
Players who left during the season but made an appearance
20	FW	(Nigeria)	Asisat Oshoala	2+7	6	1	1	0+2	0	0+2	1	14	8	0	0	
Own goals (1)

=== Goalscorers ===
As of last matchday.

Rank	No.	Pos.	Nat.	Player	Liga F	Copa de la Reina	Supercopa de España	Champions League	Total
1	7	FW	(Spain)	Salma Paralluelo	20	4	4	6	34
2	10	FW	(Norway)	Caroline Graham Hansen	21	3	3	5	32
3	9	FW	(Spain)	Mariona Caldentey	10	6	2	2	20
4	14	MF	(Spain)	Aitana Bonmatí	8	4	1	6	19
5	6	FW	(Spain)	Clàudia Pina	13	2	—	1	16
6	11	MF	(Spain)	Alexia Putellas	8	—	—	3	11
7	12	MF	(Spain)	Patricia Guijarro	5	1	—	4	10
8	30	MF	(Spain)	Vicky López	9	—	—	—	9
8	8	DF	(Spain)	Marta Torrejón	8	—	—	1	9
10	20	FW	(Nigeria)	Asisat Oshoala	6	1	—	1	8
11	24	MF	(Netherlands)	Esmee Brugts	7	—	—	—	7
11	16	FW	(Sweden)	Fridolina Rolfö	5	—	—	2	7
11	22	DF	(Spain)	Ona Batlle	3	3	1	—	7
14	19	FW	(Spain)	Bruna Vilamala	4	—	—	—	4
15	34	DF	(Spain)	Martina Fernández	1	1	—	1	3
16	32	FW	(Spain)	Ariana Arias	1	1	—	—	2
16	21	MF	(England)	Keira Walsh	1	—	—	1	2
16	15	DF	(England)	Lucy Bronze	1	—	—	1	2
19	4	DF	(Spain)	Mapi León	1	—	—	—	1
19	26	MF	(Italy)	Giulia Dragoni	—	1	—	—	1
Own goals (from the opponents)					5	—	—	2	7
Totals					137	27	11	36	211

=== Hat-tricks ===
Player	Against	Minutes	Score after goals	Result	Date	Competition	Ref
(Spain) Salma Paralluelo^{4}	(Spain) Sevilla	7', 17', 37', 39'	1–0, 2–0, 3–0, 4–0	8–0 (H)	5 November 2023	Liga F	
(Netherlands) Esmee Brugts	(Spain) Eibar	58', 61', 66'	2–0, 3–0, 4–0	5–0 (H)	9 December 2023	Liga F	
(Norway) Caroline Graham Hansen	(Spain) Levante	24', 36', 54'	2–0, 4–0, 6–0	7–0 (N)	20 January 2024	Supercopa de España	
(Spain) Salma Paralluelo^{4}	(Spain) Real Sociedad	22', 24', 44', 51'	0–2, 0–3, 0–4, 0–5	1–7 (A)	10 March 2024	Liga F	

(H) – Home; (A) – Away; (N) – Neutral venue (final)
^{4} – Player scored four goals.

=== Assists ===
As of last matchday.

Rank	No.	Pos.	Nat.	Player	Liga F	Copa de la Reina	Supercopa de España	Champions League	Total
1	10	FW	(Norway)	Caroline Graham Hansen	19	2	2	5	28
2	14	MF	(Spain)	Aitana Bonmatí	11	—	2	6	19
3	9	FW	(Spain)	Mariona Caldentey	9	6	—	3	18
4	22	DF	(Spain)	Ona Batlle	6	1	3	3	13
5	24	MF	(Netherlands)	Esmee Brugts	6	2	—	2	10
6	12	MF	(Spain)	Patricia Guijarro	5	2	—	2	9
7	6	FW	(Spain)	Clàudia Pina	5	—	—	3	8
7	15	DF	(England)	Lucy Bronze	4	—	—	4	8
9	7	FW	(Spain)	Salma Paralluelo	3	2	1	1	7
10	21	MF	(England)	Keira Walsh	5	1	—	—	6
10	30	MF	(Spain)	Vicky López	4	2	—	—	6
12	11	MF	(Spain)	Alexia Putellas	5	—	—	—	5
13	19	FW	(Spain)	Bruna Vilamala	4	—	—	—	4
14	8	DF	(Spain)	Marta Torrejón	3	—	—	—	3
14	16	FW	(Sweden)	Fridolina Rolfö	2	1	—	—	3
14	34	DF	(Spain)	Martina Fernández	2	—	—	1	3
17	2	DF	(Spain)	Irene Paredes	2	—	—	—	2
17	40	FW	(Spain)	Lucía Corrales	1	1	—	—	2
19	23	MF	(Norway)	Ingrid Engen	—	—	—	1	1
Totals					96	20	8	31	155

=== Hat-trick of assists ===
Player	Against	Minutes	Score after assists	Result	Date	Competition	Ref
(Norway) Caroline Graham Hansen	(Spain) Sevilla	7', 37', 39'	1–0, 3–0, 4–0	8–0 (H)	5 November 2023	Liga F	
(Norway) Caroline Graham Hansen	(Portugal) Benfica	44', 52', 61'	3–0, 4–0, 5–0	5–0 (H)	14 November 2023	Champions League	
(Norway) Caroline Graham Hansen	(Spain) Athletic Club	36', 87', 90+2'	0–1, 0–3, 0–4	0–4 (A)	26 November 2023	Liga F	
(Spain) Alexia Putellas	(Spain) Madrid CFF	33', 45', 48'	3–0, 5–0, 6–0	8–0 (H)	1 May 2024	Liga F	
(Spain) Mariona Caldentey	(Spain) Real Sociedad	13', 33', 52'	0–2, 0–5, 0–7	0–8 (N)	18 May 2024	Copa de la Reina	

(H) – Home; (A) – Away; (N) – Neutral venue (final)

=== Cleansheets ===
As of last matchday.

Rank	No.	Nat.	Player	Liga F	Copa de la Reina	Supercopa de España	Champions League	Total
1	13	(Spain)	Cata Coll	12	1	2	4	19
2	1	(Spain)	Sandra Paños	8	2	—	2	12
3	25	(Spain)	Gemma Font	1	1	—	0	2
Totals				21	4	2	6	33

=== Disciplinary record ===
As of last matchday.

No.	Pos.	Nat.	Player	Liga F			Copa de la Reina			Supercopa de España			Champions League			Total		
No.	Pos.	Nat.	Player	Yellow card	(yellow card) (yellow-red card)	Red card	Yellow card	(yellow card) (yellow-red card)	Red card	Yellow card	(yellow card) (yellow-red card)	Red card	Yellow card	(yellow card) (yellow-red card)	Red card	Yellow card	(yellow card) (yellow-red card)	Red card
2	DF	(Spain)	Irene Paredes	3									2			5		
15	DF	(England)	Lucy Bronze	3												3		
34	DF	(Spain)	Martina Fernández	2												2		
24	MF	(Netherlands)	Esmee Brugts	1			1									2		
12	MF	(Spain)	Patricia Guijarro	1									1			2		
7	FW	(Spain)	Salma Paralluelo	1									1			2		
22	DF	(Spain)	Ona Batlle										2			2		
8	DF	(Spain)	Marta Torrejón	1												1		
30	MF	(Spain)	Vicky López	1												1		
6	FW	(Spain)	Clàudia Pina	1												1		
25	GK	(Spain)	Gemma Font	1												1		
5	DF	(Spain)	Jana Fernández	1												1		
13	GK	(Spain)	Cata Coll				1									1		
10	FW	(Norway)	Caroline Graham Hansen				1									1		
9	FW	(Spain)	Mariona Caldentey										1			1		
11	MF	(Spain)	Alexia Putellas										1			1		
Totals				16			3						8			27		

Source: FCBarcelona.com
Ordered by (red card) , (second yellow card) and (yellow card)
(yellow card) = Number of bookings; (second yellow card) = Number of sending offs after a second yellow card; (red card) = Number of sending offs by a direct red card.

=== Injury record ===
No.	Pos.	Nat.	Name	Type	Status	Source	Match	Inj. Date	Ret. Date
20	FW	(Nigeria)	Asisat Oshoala	Hamstring injury – left thigh		FCB Twitter	in training	3 June 2023	21 July 2023
21	MF	(England)	Keira Walsh	Ligament damage – right knee		BBC, Athletic	vs Denmark with England	28 July 2023	7 August 2023
21	MF	(England)	Keira Walsh	Ligament damage – right knee		Mundo Deportivo	vs Nigeria with England	7 August 2023	8 August 2023
14	MF	(Spain)	Aitana Bonmatí	Adductor injury		Marca	vs Switzerland with Spain	5 August 2023	6 August 2023
14	MF	(Spain)	Aitana Bonmatí	Adductor injury		Marca	vs Netherlands with Spain	11 August 2023	15 August 2023
3	DF	(Spain)	Laia Codina	Hamstring injury		Marca	vs Netherlands with Spain	11 August 2023	15 August 2023
3	DF	(Spain)	Laia Codina	Hamstring injury		Marca	vs England with Spain	20 August 2023	21 August 2023
16	FW	(Sweden)	Fridolina Rolfö	Meniscus tear – right knee		FCB.com	with Sweden	5 September 2023 (Note: Date of club announcement)	6 March 2024
21	MF	(England)	Keira Walsh	Soleus muscle injury — left calf		FCB Twitter	in training	13 September 2023 (Note: Date of England announcement)	7 October 2023
5	DF	(Spain)	Jana Fernández	Quadriceps injury — left thigh		FCB Twitter	in training	15 September 2023	30 September 2023
7	FW	(Spain)	Salma Paralluelo	Posterior capsule injury — left knee		FCB Twitter	in training	15 September 2023	14 October 2023
10	FW	(Norway)	Caroline Graham Hansen	Muscle injury – right leg		Sport	vs Austria with Norway	22 September 2023	30 September 2023
5	DF	(Spain)	Jana Fernández	Muscle injury — left thigh		FCB Twitter	in training	7 October 2023	reinjured
10	FW	(Norway)	Caroline Graham Hansen	Ankle sprain – right ankle		FCB Twitter	in training	14 October 2023	5 November 2023
2	DF	(Spain)	Irene Paredes	Adductor strain — right thigh		FCB Twitter	in training	21 October 2023	5 November 2023
12	MF	(Spain)	Patricia Guijarro	Quadriceps muscle strain — right thigh		FCB Twitter	in training	5 November 2023	14 November 2023
19	FW	(Spain)	Bruna Vilamala	Quadriceps muscle strain — right thigh		FCB Twitter	in training	5 November 2023	21 December 2023
11	MF	(Spain)	Alexia Putellas	Discomfort – left knee		FCB Twitter	vs Benfica	14 November 2023	6 March 2024
20	FW	(Nigeria)	Asisat Oshoala	Hamstring discomfort – right thigh		FCB Twitter	in training	25 November 2023	12 December 2023
4	DF	(Spain)	Mapi León	Cervical strain		FCB Twitter	in training	25 November 2023	reinjured
10	FW	(Norway)	Caroline Graham Hansen	Ankle injury		NRK	vs Portugal with Norway	1 December 2023	9 December 2023
37	GK	(Spain)	Txell Font	Meniscus tear Anterior cruciate ligament injury		Sport	in training	4 December 2023 (Note: Date of club announcement of meniscus tear. Txell Font said later in the month, once she had undergone successful surgery, that she had also torn her ACL.)	
2	DF	(Spain)	Irene Paredes	Rectus muscle injury — right thigh		FCB Twitter	with Spain	7 December 2023	6 January 2024
4	DF	(Spain)	Mapi León	Meniscus tear – right knee		FCB Twitter	in training	8 December 2023	25 May 2024
13	GK	(Spain)	Cata Coll	Ankle sprain – right ankle		FCB Twitter	in training	12 December 2023	16 January 2024
40	FW	(Spain)	Lucía Corrales	Ankle discomfort		Futbol Mallorca	in training	12 December 2023	16 January 2024
5	DF	(Spain)	Jana Fernández	Biceps femoris injury — right thigh		FCB Twitter	in training	16 December 2023	13 April 2024
8	DF	(Spain)	Marta Torrejón	Ankle sprain – right ankle		FCB Twitter	vs Levante Las Planas	6 January 2024	16 January 2024
1	GK	(Spain)	Sandra Paños	Calf injury – left leg		FCB Twitter	in training	20 January 2024	14 February 2024
25	GK	(Spain)	Gemma Font	Ankle sprain – right ankle		FCB Twitter	in training	23 March 2024	30 March 2024
10	FW	(Norway)	Caroline Graham Hansen	Muscle injury – right thigh		Sport	with Norway	3 April 2024	20 April 2024
22	DF	(Spain)	Ona Batlle	Facial injury		Mundo Deportivo; Diario AS	vs Lyon	25 May 2024 (Note: Batlle continued playing but was subsequently released from the Spain camp that was to start two days later due to the injury.)	9 June 2024
14	MF	(Spain)	Aitana Bonmatí	Adductor injury – right thigh		FCB.com	with Spain	30 May 2024	
34	DF	(Spain)	Martina Fernández	Lateral meniscus tear — right knee		FCB Twitter	in training	8 June 2024	

- Player is injured
- Player has recovered from injury
Source: FC Barcelona

== Awards ==
Name	Position	Award	Ref.
(Spain) Ona Batlle	Defender	GOAL World-Class Club	
(Spain) Aitana Bonmatí	Midfielder	GOAL World-Class Club	
(Norway) Caroline Graham Hansen	Forward	GOAL World-Class Club	
(Spain) Patricia Guijarro	Midfielder	GOAL World-Class Club	
(Spain) Mapi León	Defender	GOAL World-Class Club	
(Spain) Irene Paredes	Defender	GOAL World-Class Club	
(Spain) Alexia Putellas	Midfielder	GOAL World-Class Club	
(England) Keira Walsh	Midfielder	GOAL World-Class Club	
(Spain) Mariona Caldentey	Forward	Catalunya Ràdio Trofeu Kubala	
FC Barcelona		Medalla d'Honor del Parlament de Catalunya	
(Spain) Aitana Bonmatí	Midfielder	FIFA Golden Ball Award (2023) (1st award – shared record)	
(Spain) Salma Paralluelo	Forward	FIFA Young Player Award (2023) (1st award – shared record)	
(Spain) Aitana Bonmatí	Midfielder	UEFA Women's Player of the Year Award (2022–23) (1st award)	
(Spain) Aitana Bonmatí	Midfielder	433 Awards: Women's Player of the Year (2022–23) (1st award – record)	
(Spain) Salma Paralluelo	Forward	433 Awards: Women's Talent of the Year (2022–23) (1st award – record)	
(Spain) Jonatan Giráldez	Coach	Royal Galician Football Federation Silver Medal	
(Spain) Aitana Bonmatí	Midfielder	Premio Woman Sport 2023	
(Spain) Marta Torrejón	Defender	Trofeo Campeones con Valores	
(Spain) Aitana Bonmatí	Midfielder	Ballon d'Or (2022–23) (1st award)	
FC Barcelona		Women's Club of the Year (2022–23) (1st award – record)	
(Spain) Jonatan Giráldez	Coach	Premios MARCA Best Women's Coach	
(Spain) Aitana Bonmatí	Midfielder	Mundo Deportivo European Women's Football Awards – MVP Trophy	
(Spain) Patricia Guijarro	Midfielder	Mundo Deportivo European Women's Football Awards – Talent Trophy	
(Sweden) Fridolina Rolfö	Forward	Mundo Deportivo European Women's Football Awards – International Impact Trophy	
(Spain) Alexia Putellas	Midfielder	Bazaar Women of the Year – Sport Award	
FC Barcelona		Football Content Awards – Best Football Club, Women's Football Gold Award	
(Nigeria) Asisat Oshoala	Forward	UEFA Women's Champions League Goal of the Week – Matchday 1 (vs Benfica)	
(Spain) Aitana Bonmatí	Midfielder	Golden Player Woman (2023) (1st award – shared record)	
(Spain) Óscar Belis	Coach – Barcelona B	Catalan Football Federation Day of the Coach Awards	
(Spain) Aitana Bonmatí	Midfielder	BBC 100 Women (2023)	
(Spain) Aitana Bonmatí	Midfielder	Catalan Football Stars Gala (2023) – Best Women's Catalan Player of the Year (2022–23) (2nd award)	
(Spain) María Pérez	Midfielder	Catalan Football Stars Gala (2023) – Most Promising Women's Player (1st award)	
(Spain) Aitana Bonmatí	Midfielder	Òmnium Cultural Joan B. Cendrós International Prize 2023	
(Nigeria) Asisat Oshoala	Forward	African Women's Footballer of the Year (6th award – record)	
(Spain) Patricia Guijarro	Midfielder	UEFA Women's Champions League Goal of the Week – Matchday 3 (vs Rosengård)	
(Spain) Aitana Bonmatí	Midfielder	World Soccer Women's World Player of the Year (2023) (1st award)	
(Norway) Caroline Graham Hansen	Forward	UEFA Women's Champions League Goal of the Week – Matchday 4 (vs Rosengård)	
(Spain) Aitana Bonmatí	Midfielder	IFFHS Women's World Best Player 2023 (1st award)	
(Spain) Salma Paralluelo	Forward	IFFHS Women's World Best Youth (U20) Player 2023 (1st award – shared record)	
(Spain) Jonatan Giráldez	Coach	IFFHS Women's World's Best Club Coach 2023 (1st award – shared record)	
(Spain) Aitana Bonmatí	Midfielder	IFFHS Women's World's Best Playmaker 2023 (1st award)	
(Spain) Aitana Bonmatí	Midfielder	Mundo Deportivo Sports Personality of the Year Award (2023)	
(Sweden) Fridolina Rolfö	Forward	Fotbollsgalan – Swedish Forward of the Year (2023) (4th award – shared record)	
(Norway) Caroline Graham Hansen	Forward	Golden Ball – Best Norwegian Female Player of the Year (2023) (4th award – record)	
(Spain) Aitana Bonmatí	Midfielder	International Sports Press Association (AIPS) – European Sportswoman of the Year (2023) (1st award)	
(Spain) Aitana Bonmatí	Midfielder	IFFHS Women's World Team (2023) (3rd appearance)	
(Spain) Salma Paralluelo	Forward	IFFHS Women's World Team (2023) (1st appearance)	
(Spain) Salma Paralluelo	Forward	IFFHS Women's Youth (U20) World Team (2023) (2nd appearance)	
(Spain) Vicky López	Midfielder	IFFHS Women's Youth (U20) World Team (2023) (2nd appearance)	
(Spain) Meritxell Font	Goalkeeper	IFFHS Women's Youth (U20) World Team (2023) (2nd appearance)	
(Italy) Giulia Dragoni	Midfielder	IFFHS Women's Youth (U20) World Team (2023) (1st appearance)	
FC Barcelona		IFFHS Women's World Best Club (2023) (3rd award)	
FC Barcelona		IFFHS Women's Best Club – UEFA (2023) (3rd award – record)	
(Spain) Aitana Bonmatí	Midfielder	The 10 Best Female Footballers in the World 2023 – #1 (1st #1 appearance)	
(Spain) Salma Paralluelo	Forward	The 10 Best Female Footballers in the World 2023 – #3 (1st top 10 appearance)	
(England) Keira Walsh	Midfielder	The 10 Best Female Footballers in the World 2023 – #4 (2nd top 10 appearance)	
(Sweden) Fridolina Rolfö	Forward	The 10 Best Female Footballers in the World 2023 – #5 (1st top 10 appearance)	
(Norway) Caroline Graham Hansen	Forward	The 10 Best Female Footballers in the World 2023 – #7 (4th top 10 appearance)	
(Spain) Mapi León	Defender	The 10 Best Female Footballers in the World 2023 – #8 (1st top 10 appearance)	
(England) Keira Walsh	Midfielder	She's A Baller of the Year 2023	
(Spain) Aitana Bonmatí	Midfielder	The Best FIFA Women's Player (2023) (1st award)	
(England) Lucy Bronze	Defender	FIFA FIFPRO Women's World 11 (2023) (6th appearance)	
(England) Keira Walsh	Midfielder	FIFA FIFPRO Women's World 11 (2023) (2nd appearance)	
(Spain) Aitana Bonmatí	Midfielder	FIFA FIFPRO Women's World 11 (2023) (1st appearance)	
(Spain) Óscar Belis	Coach – Barcelona B	Golsmedia FutbolFest Awards (2023) – Best Coach of the Primera Federación (2022–23)	
(Spain) Aitana Bonmatí	Midfielder	EA Sports FC Women's Team of the Year (2023)	
(Norway) Caroline Graham Hansen	Forward	EA Sports FC Women's Team of the Year (2023)	
(Spain) Alexia Putellas	Midfielder	EA Sports FC Women's Team of the Year (2023)	
(Spain) Ona Batlle	Defender	EA Sports FC Women's Team of the Year (2023)	
(Spain) Aitana Bonmatí	Midfielder	Globe Soccer Awards – Best Women's Player of the Year (2023) (1st award)	
FC Barcelona		Globe Soccer Awards – Best Women's Club of the Year (2023) (2nd award – record)	
(Spain) Patricia Guijarro	Midfielder	UEFA Women's Champions League Goal of the Week – Matchday 5 (vs Eintracht Frankfurt)	
(Spain) Aitana Bonmatí	Midfielder	UEFA Women's Nations League Player of the Finals (2024) (1st award – record)	
(Spain) Aitana Bonmatí	Midfielder	UEFA Women's Champions League Goal of the Week – Quarter-finals – 2nd leg (vs Brann)	
(Norway) Caroline Graham Hansen	Forward	UEFA Women's Champions League Player of the Week – Quarter-finals – 2nd leg (vs Brann)	
(Spain) Aitana Bonmatí	Midfielder	Laureus World Sports Award for Sportswoman of the Year (2023) (1st award)	
(Spain) Aitana Bonmatí	Midfielder	Liga F Team of the Season (2023–24) (1st appearance)	
(Norway) Caroline Graham Hansen	Forward	Liga F Team of the Season (2023–24) (1st appearance)	
(Spain) Alexia Putellas	Midfielder	Liga F Team of the Season (2023–24) (1st appearance)	
(Spain) Salma Paralluelo	Forward	Liga F Team of the Season (2023–24) (1st appearance)	
(Spain) Patricia Guijarro	Midfielder	Liga F Team of the Season (2023–24) (1st appearance)	
(Spain) Aitana Bonmatí	Midfielder	UEFA Women's Champions League Player of the Season (2023–24) (2nd award – record)	
(Spain) Aitana Bonmatí	Midfielder	UEFA Women's Champions League Team of the Season (2023–24)	
(England) Lucy Bronze	Defender	UEFA Women's Champions League Team of the Season (2023–24)	
(Spain) Irene Paredes	Defender	UEFA Women's Champions League Team of the Season (2023–24)	
(Spain) Patricia Guijarro	Midfielder	UEFA Women's Champions League Team of the Season (2023–24)	
(Norway) Caroline Graham Hansen	Forward	UEFA Women's Champions League Team of the Season (2023–24)	
(Nigeria) Asisat Oshoala	Forward	UEFA Women's Champions League Goal of the Season – Matchday 1 (vs Benfica) (2023–24)	
FC Barcelona		Globe Soccer Awards – Europe Edition: Best Women's Club of the Year (2024) (3rd award – record)	
(Spain) Alexia Putellas	Midfielder	Congress of the Business Council Alliance for Ibero-America (CEAPI) – 'Woman, Business and Leadership' award	
(Norway) Caroline Graham Hansen	Forward	Liga F Pichichi – 21 goals (2023–24) (1st award)	
