= Gemma Font =

Spanish footballer (born 1999)

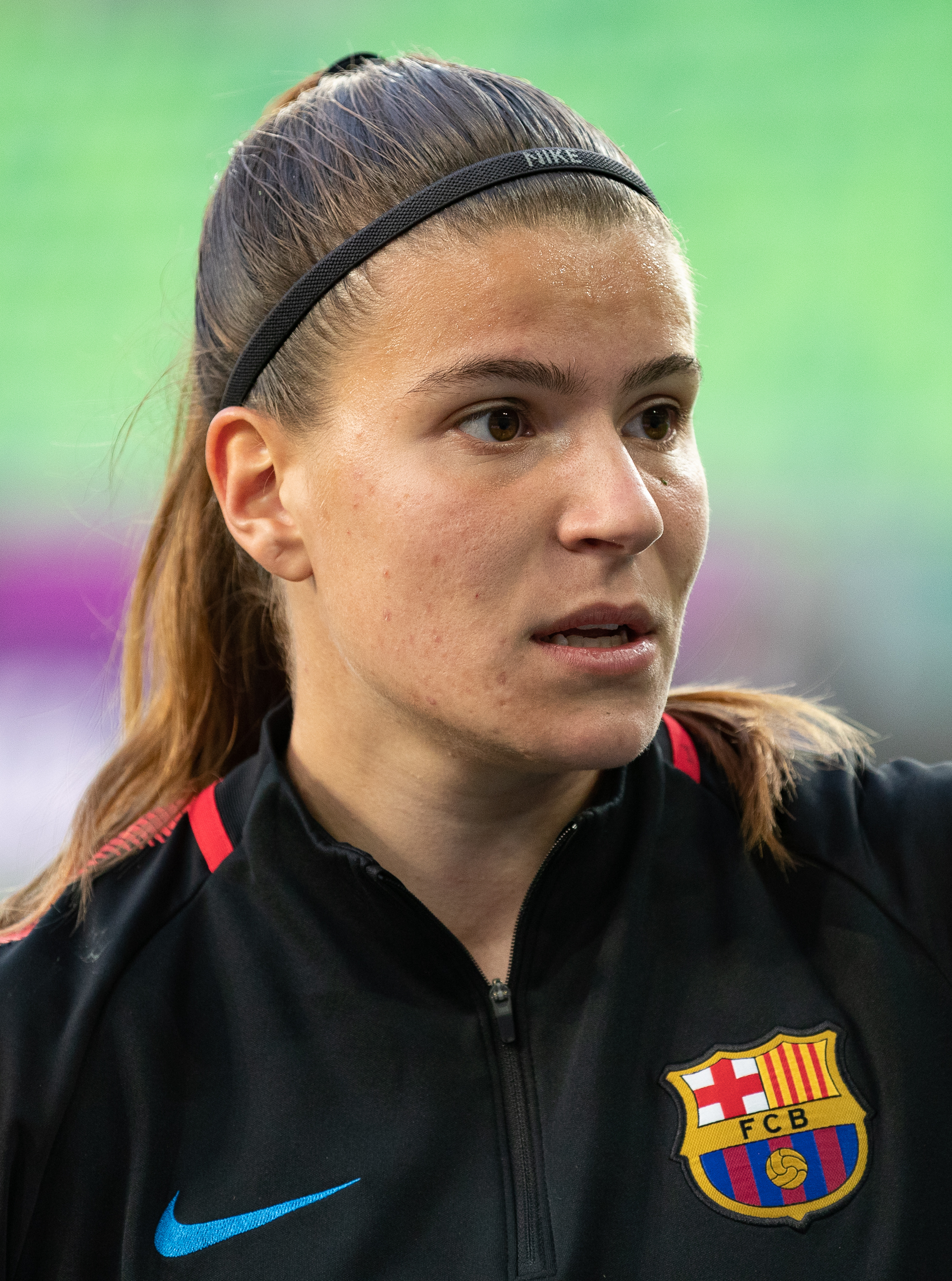
- Font with Barcelona in 2019

Personal information
- Full name: Gemma Font Oliveras
- Date of birth: 23 October 1999 (age 27)
- Place of birth: Tagamanent, Spain
- Height: 1.65 m (5 ft 5 in)
- Position: Goalkeeper

Team information
- Current team: Barcelona
- Number: 1

Youth career
- 2013–2016: Barcelona

Senior career*
Years	Team	Apps	(Gls)
2016–2021	Barcelona B	23	(0)
2018–	Barcelona	32	(0)

International career^{‡}
2022–	Spain U23	5	(0)
2024–	Catalonia	2	(0)
- * Club domestic league appearances and goals as of 01:02, 9 September 2024 (UTC) ‡ National team caps and goals as of 03:45, 22 December 2025 (UTC)

Gemma Font Oliveras (Catalan pronunciation: [ˈʒemːə ˈfon uliˈβeɾəs]; born 23 October 1999) is a Spanish professional footballer from Catalonia who plays as a goalkeeper for Liga F club FC Barcelona and the Catalonia national team.

== Personal life ==
Gemma Font is the older sister of Meritxell Font, who plays as a goalkeeper for Barcelona B.

== Club career ==
Font started her career in Barcelona's academy in 2013. In June 2020, following the 2019–20 season in which she played 14 games for Barcelona B in the Segunda División, Font renewed her contract with Barcelona until 2022. She had spent the season alternating between training with the first team and starting as goalkeeper for the B team. On 20 January 2021, she made her debut for Barcelona in a Primera División game against Rayo Vallecano. She entered the field as a substitute for Sandra Paños at half-time in a 7–0 victory for Barcelona.

On 6 June 2022, she signed a contract extension with Barcelona until 2024. Having had a larger role in the 2022–23 season, with injuries to other goalkeepers Paños and Cata Coll, Font returned to being third choice in 2023–24. She played two competitive games, keeping a cleansheet in one.

== International career ==
Font was called up to the Spain under-23 team in 2021.

== Career statistics ==
=== Club ===
As of match played 8 September 2024

Appearances and goals by club, season and competition
Club	Season	League			Copa de la Reina		UWCL		Other		Total	
Club	Season	Division	Apps	Goals	Apps	Goals	Apps	Goals	Apps	Goals	Apps	Goals
Barcelona B	2019–20	Segunda División Pro	14	0	—		—		—		14	0
Barcelona B	2020–21	Segunda División Pro	9	0	—		—		—		9	0
Barcelona B	Total		23	0	—		—		—		23	0
Barcelona	2020–21	Primera División	4	0	0	0	1	0	0	0	5	0
Barcelona	2021–22	Primera División	6	0	0	0	0	0	0	0	6	0
Barcelona	2022–23	Liga F	8	0	1	0	2	0	0	0	11	0
Barcelona	2023–24	Liga F	2	0	1	0	1	0	0	0	4	0
Barcelona	2024–25	Liga F	1	0	0	0	0	0	0	0	1	0
Barcelona	Total		21	0	2	0	4	0	0	0	27	0
Career total			44	0	2	0	4	0	0	0	50	0

== Honours ==
Barcelona

- Liga F: 2019–20, 2020–21, 2021–22, 2022–23, 2023–24, 2024–25, 2025–26
- Copa de la Reina: 2019–20, 2020–21, 2021–22, 2023–24, 2024–25, 2025–26
- Supercopa de España Femenina: 2019–20, 2021–22, 2022–23, 2023–24
- Copa Catalunya: 2018, 2019
- UEFA Women's Champions League: 2020–21, 2022–23, 2023–24, 2025–26
