= Jonatan Giráldez =

Spanish football coach (born 1991)

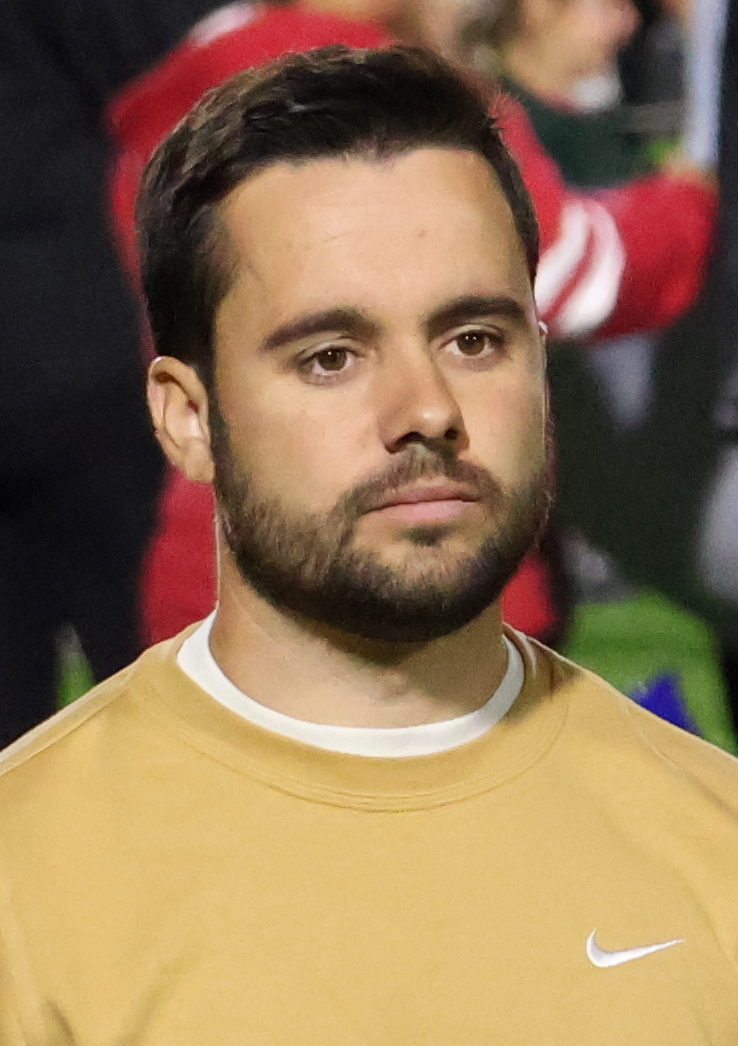
- Giráldez with the Washington Spirit in 2024

Personal information
- Full name: Jonatan Giráldez Costas
- Date of birth: 27 November 1991 (age 34)
- Place of birth: Vigo, Spain

Team information
- Current team: OL Lyonnes (head coach)

Youth career
- Years: Team
- Matamá
- Sárdoma
- Coruxo
- Areosa

Managerial career
- Catalonia men U12
- Catalonia women U16 (assistant)
- Catalonia women U18 (assistant)
- 2019–2021: Barcelona Femení (assistant)
- 2021–2024: Barcelona Femení
- 2024–2025: Washington Spirit
- 2025–: OL Lyonnes

Jonatan Giráldez Costas (born 27 November 1991) is a Spanish football coach who is the current head coach of Première Ligue team OL Lyonnes. He has previously coached the Washington Spirit of the National Women's Soccer League (NWSL) and Liga F club Barcelona Femení.

Prior to joining the Spirit in 2024 he spent his entire career, including work in sports analytics, in Catalonia. Initially working in youth football, he joined FC Barcelona Femení as an assistant coach in 2019; he was promoted to head coach in July 2021, leading Barcelona to a domestic treble in the 2021–22 season, a treble including the Champions League in the 2022–23 season, and a continental quadruple in the 2023–24 season. Taking 10 of the 12 available trophies in his time as head coach, Giráldez' Barcelona Femení was considered dynastic.

== Early years ==
Jonatan Giráldez Costas was born on 27 November 1991, in Vigo, Spain,. He recalls understanding football before he could read, having watched intently with his grandfather. Growing up, he played football at any opportunity, and had stints with local clubs Sárdoma, Coruxo and Areosa between 1997 and 2012, but even when young decided he would be better coaching. Discussing his players' adaptability and comprehension of coaching instructions in 2024, Giráldez said that he "wish[ed] [he] had played football like [Keira Walsh] plays".

Giráldez described the mentality of his family as one that sacrificed passions for practicality – noting that his grandfather had been a sailor and worked at a treatment plant despite wanting to be a gardener – but that he did not want to do this himself, and found a way to continue in football. He studied sports science at the University of Vigo, and then moved to Barcelona in 2012 to study a master's degree in sports instruction at the University of Barcelona. In his early years in Catalonia, he commentated on matches and taught courses for people pursuing UEFA coaching licences.

== Career ==
=== Youth teams ===
Giráldez's first roles were in coaching and sports analytics for RCD Espanyol Cantera and the youth sections of the Catalonia women's regional football team. He then became the head coach of the under-12 Catalonia men's regional football team, his first managerial role, and the assistant coach of the under-16 and under-18 Catalonia women's teams.

=== Barcelona Femení ===
In 2019, he joined the coaching staff of Lluís Cortés at FC Barcelona Femení, following Fran Sánchez' dismissal. Spending three years as a technical assistant, Giráldez held an increasingly important role in training and game strategy; the team reached the UEFA Women's Champions League finals, and won most domestic titles in this era. The 2020–21 season, in which they won the continental treble, is considered one of the best in history. At the end of this season, Cortés left the position as manager; though Cortés' departure was rather unusual due to the team's monumental and growing success, it was reported that there were fractured relationships between him and some of the players, with all parties finding it beneficial to make the change. Two days later, Giráldez was formally announced to be taking over, initially on a one-year contract. His first match in charge of the club, a pre-season friendly, saw Barcelona defeat Elche 17–0.

For his first season in charge, the 2021–22 season, Giráldez won the Best Coach award in the Marca Women's Sports Awards Gala. At the start of the 2022–23 season, Giráldez' contract was renewed until the end of the 2023–24 season, and on 5 March 2023, Barcelona played their 50th league match under Giráldez: in defeating Villarreal 5–0, the team also achieved their 50th consecutive league win under Giráldez, a perfect record for the manager. In June 2023, Giráldez coached the team to their second Champions League title in the 2023 UEFA Women's Champions League final. For the exceptional season, he received various awards and nominations, including winning the IFFHS Women's World's Best Club Coach award and placing third for both the UEFA Women's Coach of the Year Award and The Best FIFA Women's Coach Award.

In December 2023, part way through the 2023–24 season, there were widespread rumours that Giráldez would leave the club upon the expiry of his contract on 30 June 2024; Giráldez confirmed later in the month that he was not renewing, adding that Barcelona's offer to give him a new contract had been very good and this was not a motivation. He did not reveal his new club, though said it was not in Europe because it was important to him that he would not have to play against Barcelona. Still, there was some criticism in Barcelona in the months after the announcement, when it was suggested that Giráldez was more focused on his new team than overseeing the success of his current one; he dismissed this.

Giráldez led Barcelona Femení to their first continental quadruple – of the league, Copa de la Reina, Supercopa and Champions League – in his final season with them, winning 10 trophies in his time as head coach of the team and taking 130 wins from 139 games. The Guardian opined that "Fairytale endings rarely exist but sometimes in football, the script really does write itself", in reference to him leaving the club on a high. The newspaper also felt that Giráldez, through his time as assistant and then manager, had set up the team for continued success, writing that "[they] have developed a desired combination of technical prowess and working out how to get the result over the line." Sport gave Giráldez a perfect 10 rating for the 2023–24 season, praising his ability to manage "a squad full of stars" both in terms of not being able to play everyone in every game, and in having all first-team players fit and able to play at the end of the season.

=== Washington Spirit ===
On 18 December 2023, in the break before the 2024 National Women's Soccer League (NWSL) season, Giráldez announced that he would leave Barcelona at the end of their season, primarily because he "believed that a change could be very good for [his] family". There had been rumours that he was leaving Barcelona to join an NWSL team. Spanish sports media announced later in the day that Giráldez was set to join the NWSL club Washington Spirit; the club formally announced his signing on 9 January 2024, ahead of the 2024 NWSL Draft. Giráldez chose Adrián González to be his assistant and interim head coach while he completed the European season. He officially took over on 7 July 2024, ahead of an extended period with no NWSL games. Instead, during the break for 2024 Olympic football, Giráldez' first matches with the Spirit were in the NWSL x Liga MX Femenil Summer Cup.

=== OL Lyonnes ===
On 2 June 2025, the Washington Spirit announced that Giráldez would become the head coach of OL Lyonnes in time for the start of the 2025–26 Première Ligue. Both the Spirit and OL Lyonnes are owned by Michelle Kang.

== Personal life ==
Giráldez is married and had a son in 2023. He models his coaching tactics on Pep Guardiola.

Having already spoken communicable English, Giráldez sought to improve his language skills before moving to the United States in 2024, and swapped language challenges with Barcelona's Norwegian winger Caroline Graham Hansen as he helped her advance with Spanish and she helped his English.

== Managerial statistics ==
As of match played 4 February 2026

Managerial record by team and tenure
| Team | Nat | From | To | Record | | | | | | | |
| Team | Nat | From | To | G | W | D | L | GF | GA | GD | Win % |
|---|---|---|---|---|---|---|---|---|---|---|---|
| FC Barcelona Femení | (Spain) | 1 June 2021 | 30 June 2024 | 139 | 130 | 4 | 5 | 605 | 63 | +542 | 93.53 |
| Washington Spirit | (United States) | 7 July 2024 | 2 June 2025 | 27 | 15 | 4 | 8 | 45 | 35 | +10 | 55.56 |
| OL Lyonnes | (France) | 2 June 2025 | Present | 43 | 36 | 4 | 3 | 152 | 26 | +126 | 83.72 |
| Career totals | | | | 209 | 181 | 12 | 16 | 802 | 124 | +678 | 86.60 |

== Honours ==
=== Manager ===
==== FC Barcelona Femení ====
- Primera División: 2021–22, 2022–23, 2023–24
- Copa de la Reina: 2021–22, 2023–24
- UEFA Women's Champions League: 2022–23, 2023–24
- Supercopa de España: 2021–22, 2022–23, 2023–24

==== Washington Spirit ====
- NWSL Challenge Cup: 2025

==== Individual ====
- Royal Galician Football Federation Silver Medal: honoured 2023
- Marca Women's Sports Awards Best Coach: 2021–22, 2022–23
- IFFHS Women's World's Best Club Coach: 2023, 2024
