= Ariana Arias =

Spanish footballer (born 2003)

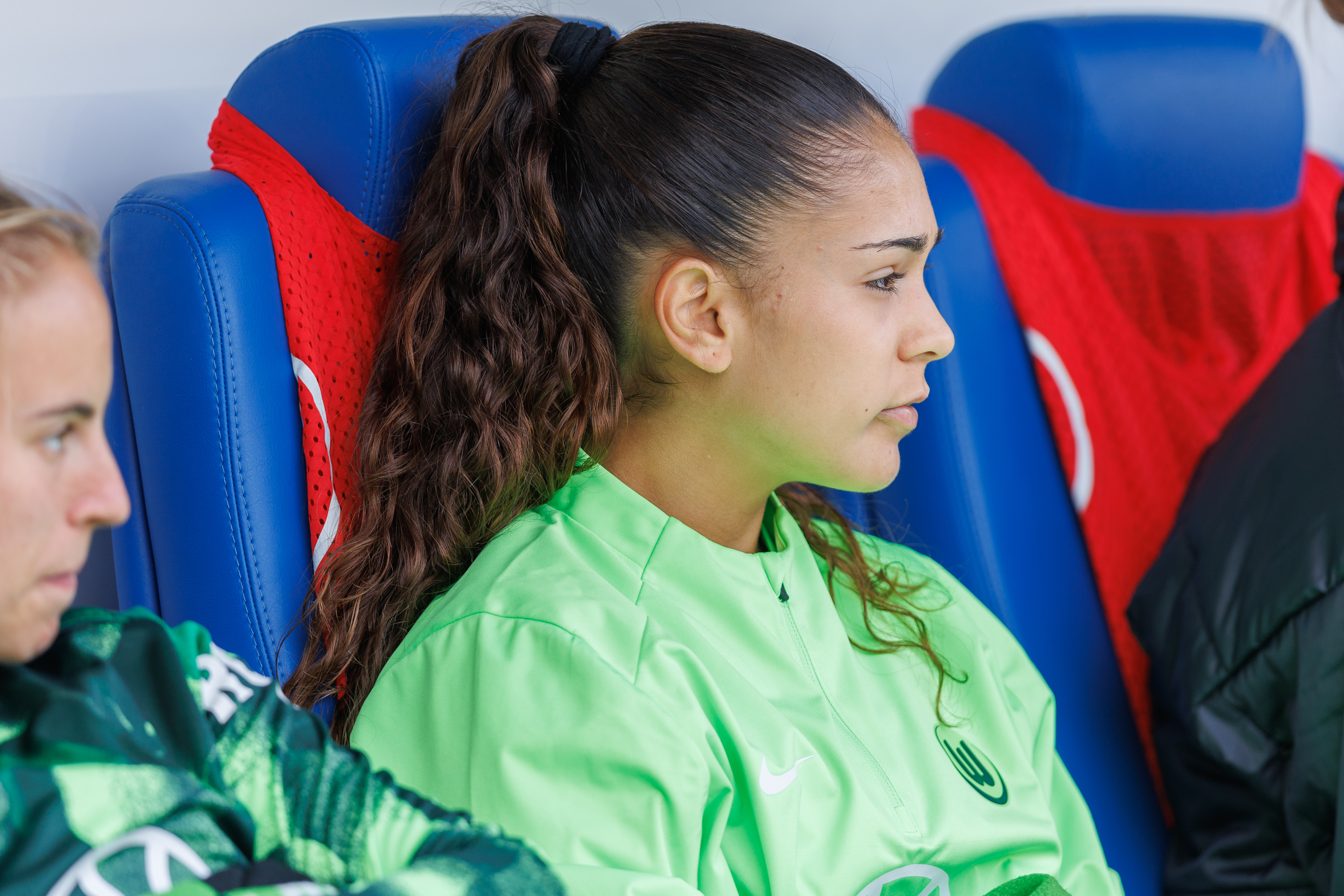

Personal information
- Full name: Ariana Arias Jiménez
- Date of birth: 23 May 2003 (age 23)
- Place of birth: Madrid Spain
- Height: 1.72 m (5 ft 8 in)
- Position: Striker

Team information
- Current team: Levante UD
- Number: 9

Senior career*
Years	Team	Apps	(Gls)
2019–2022	Real Madrid	14	(2)
2022–2024	Barcelona B	48	(30)
2022–2024	Barcelona	3	(1)
2024–2025	VfL Wolfsburg	5	(6)
2025–2026	CD Tenerife Femenino	4	(0)
2026–	Levante UD	14	(2)

International career^{‡}
2020	Spain U17	1	(0)
2023	Spain U23	7	(0)
- * Club domestic league appearances and goals as of 31 May 2026 ‡ National team caps and goals as of 2 December 2024

Ariana Arias Jiménez (born 23 May 2003) is a Spanish footballer who plays as a striker for Levante UD.

== Early life ==
Arias attended Colegio Miramadrid in Spain.

== Career ==
Arias started her career with Spanish side Real Madrid, where she was regarded as a prospect.

In summer 2024, Arias left her home country of Spain for the German Bundesliga team VfL Wolfsburg, signing a three year contract.

== Style of play ==
Arias mainly operates as a striker and has been described as "stand out with her skill with the ball and ability to convert everything she touched into a goal".

== Personal life ==
Arias is nicknamed "Ari".

== Career statistics ==
=== Club ===
As of match played 7 March 2024

Appearances and goals by club, season and competition
Club	Season	League			Cup (Note: Appearances in Copa de la Reina)		Continental (Note: Appearances in UEFA Women's Champions League)		Other		Total	
Club	Season	Division	Apps	Goals	Apps	Goals	Apps	Goals	Apps	Goals	Apps	Goals
Tacón	2019–20	Primera División	4	0	0	0	–		–		4	0
Real Madrid	2020–21	Primera División	10	2	0	0	–		–		10	2
Barcelona B	2022–23	Primera Federación	29	18	–		–		–		29	18
Barcelona B	2023–24	Primera Federación	19	12	–		–		–		19	12
Barcelona B	Total		48	30	–		–		–		48	30
Barcelona	2022–23	Liga F	1	0	0	0	0	0	0	0	1	0
Barcelona	2023–24	Liga F	2	1	1	1	1	0	0	0	4	2
Barcelona	Total		3	1	1	1	1	0	0	0	5	2
Career total			65	33	1	1	1	0	0	0	67	34

== Honours ==
FC Barcelona

- Liga F: 2023–24
- Copa de la Reina: 2023–24
- UEFA Women's Champions League: 2023–24
