= Cata Coll =

Spanish football goalkeeper (born 2001)

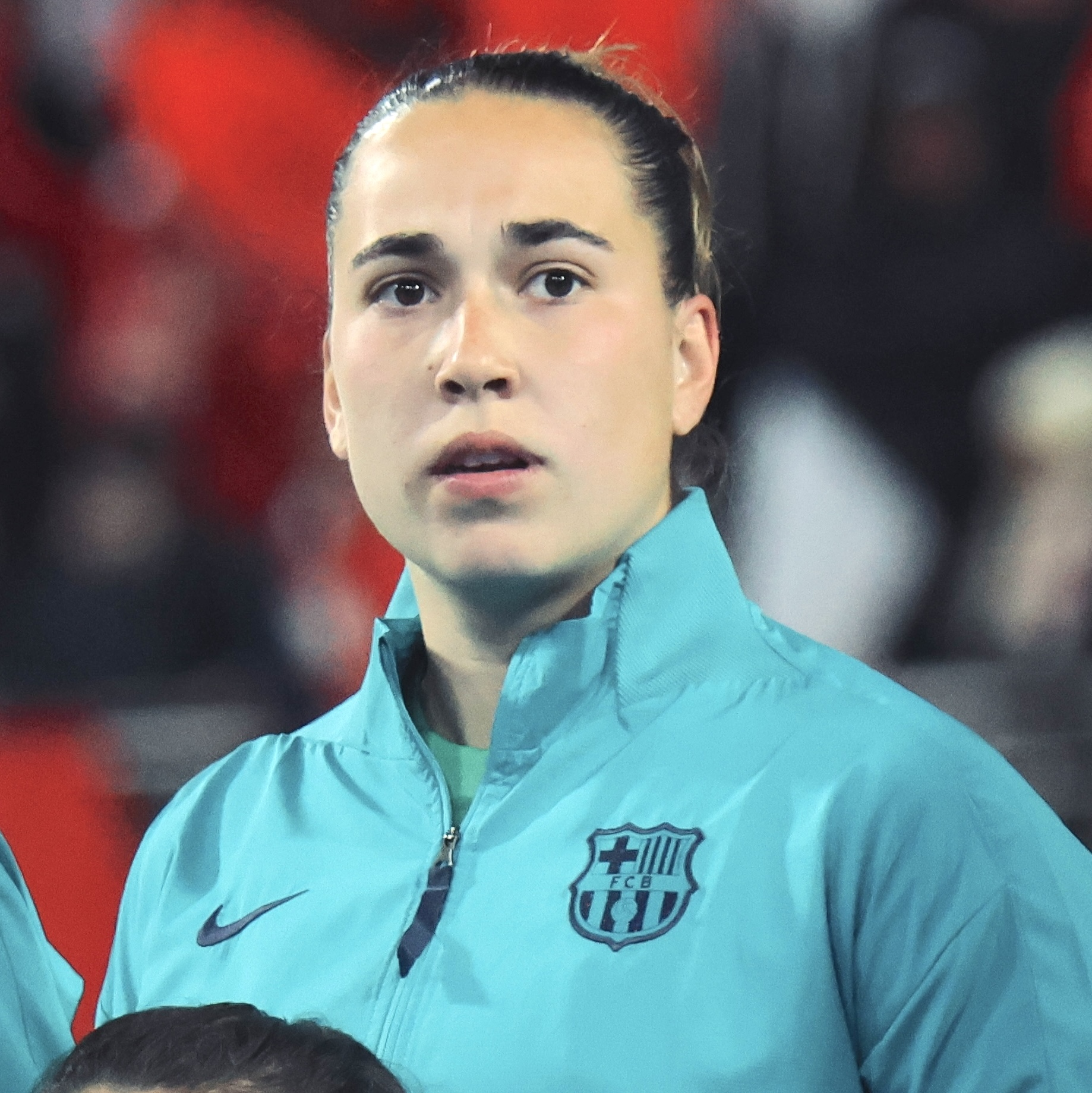
- Coll with Barcelona in 2024

Personal information
- Full name: Catalina Tomàs Coll Lluch
- Date of birth: 23 April 2001 (age 25)
- Place of birth: Pòrtol, Spain
- Height: 1.70 m (5 ft 7 in)
- Position: Goalkeeper

Team information
- Current team: Barcelona
- Number: 13

Senior career*
Years	Team	Apps	(Gls)
2015–2016	Athletic Marratxí		
2016–2019	Collerense		
2019–	Barcelona	55	(0)
2019–2020	→ Sevilla (loan)	16	(0)

International career^{‡}
2016–2018	Spain U17	18	(0)
2018	Spain U20	6	(0)
2019	Spain U19	9	(0)
2021–2022	Spain U23	2	(0)
2023–	Spain	30	(0)
Medal record
Women's football
Representing Spain
FIFA Women's World Cup
Winner	2023 Australia–New Zealand
UEFA Women's Championship
Runner-up	2025 Switzerland
UEFA Women's Nations League
Winner	2024 France–Netherlands–Spain
FIFA U-20 Women's World Cup
Runner-up	2018 France
FIFA U-17 Women's World Cup
Winner	2018 Uruguay
- * Club domestic league appearances and goals as of 20:45, 27 July 2025 (UTC) ‡ National team caps and goals as of 20:46, 27 July 2025 (UTC)

Catalina Tomàs "Cata" Coll Lluch (Balearic Catalan: [ˈkatə ˈkɔʎ ˈʎuk]; (Note: When both surnames are said together, either instance of /ʎ/ (the ll) may be rendered as a [j] (like a y in yes) or similar.) born 23 April 2001) is a Spanish professional footballer who plays as a goalkeeper for Liga F club FC Barcelona and the Spain national team. In the summer of 2018, at the age of 17, she was one of the captains during the historic triumph of the Spanish U17 team at the World Cup. In the same year, she was a starter for the U20 side at the World Cup in France.

== Early life ==
Catalina Tomàs Coll Lluch was born on 23 April 2001 in Mallorca; (Note: Her given name is spelled differently in various sources. She is registered with FIFA with the spelling "Catalina Tomas". Balearic spelling includes the grave accent in "Tomàs". IB3 spelled her name as "Thomàs", and Soccerway uses "Thomás".) she is from Pòrtol, a town in the municipality of Marratxí on the island. She is named for Catherine of Palma, a patron saint of Mallorca.

== Club career ==
Cata Coll started playing football at the age of 6 in the Sant Marçal team. She began playing as a central defender until she tried goalkeeping at the age of 11. She played in boys' teams until she was 14 years old, when she moved up to the women's team after signing for Athletic Marratxí, before moving to Collerense. In her last season, she was one of the key players in achieving promotion to the newly launched Iberdrola Challenge League. After being a pillar in her team and standing out remarkably, Coll raised the interest of Primera División clubs, finally opting for the offer of Fútbol Club Barcelona. In July 2019, it was announced that she had signed a contract until 2023 and that she would play the first season on loan to Sevilla FC in the Primera División. Coll began the season sharing minutes with Sara Serrat and Noelia Ramos, but as the games went by, she became the goalkeeper most used by the coach. In her first season in the First Division, Coll played 16 league games.

In July 2020, Barcelona confirmed Coll was returning after having played the previous year on loan. In October 2020, Coll played in goal after an injury to Sandra Paños that kept her away from the pitch for several weeks. Coll stated Paños was her idol as a child. Coll was decisive in the league match against Atlético Madrid, where she saved a penalty with the score still 0-0. She debuted in the Champions League in a qualifying match played against PSV that the team won by 4 goals to 1. In December 2020, she was injured in the match played against Sevilla. The club's medical services reported that she suffered a meniscus injury in her right leg. At the end of March, she received a medical discharge.

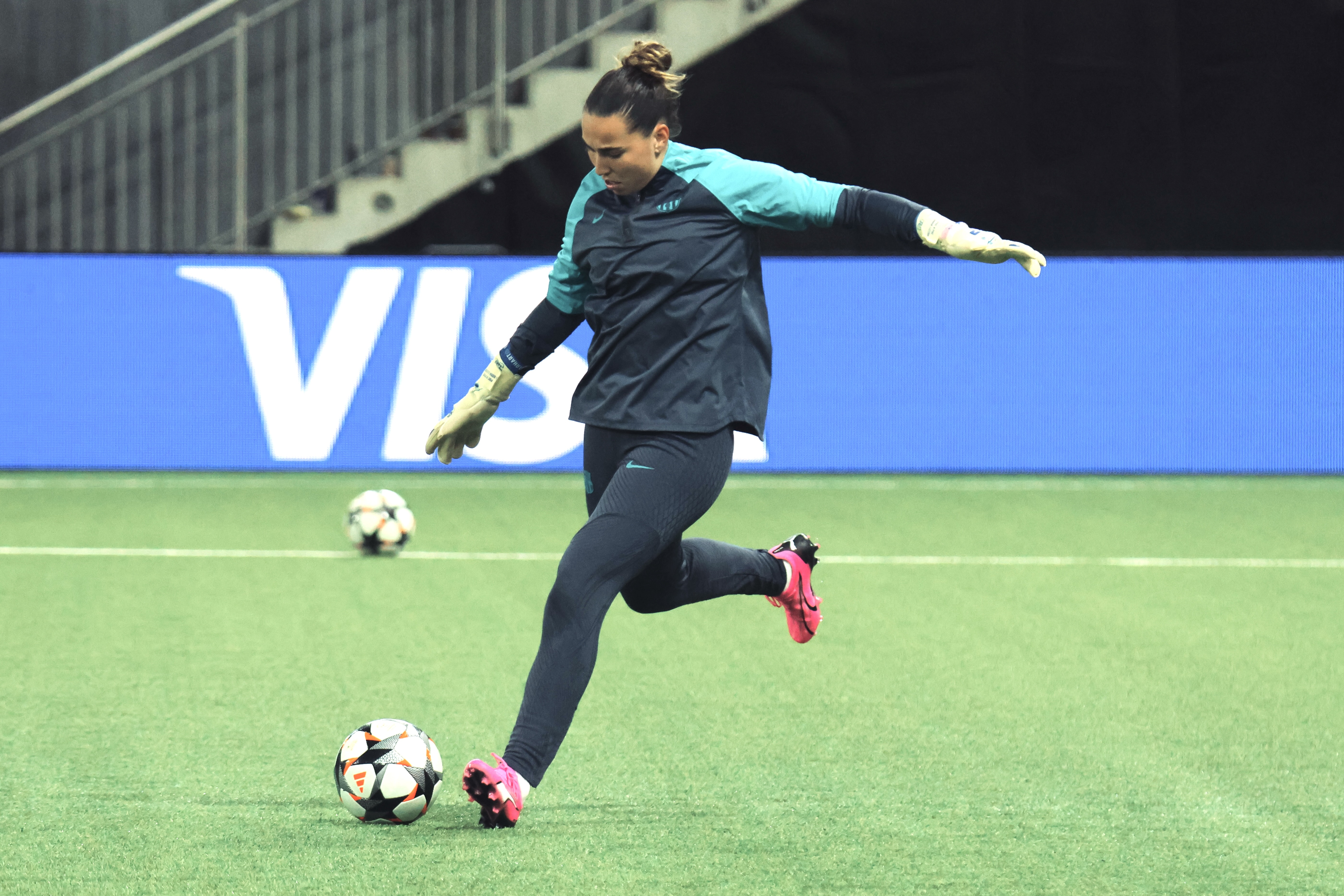
Coll with Barcelona in March 2024

In February 2023, she extended her contract with the club until June 2026. She had her breakthrough season in 2023–24, being entrusted with the majority of matches as starting goalkeeper for the first time, and reliably performed; she conceded six goals in the season, three each in the Champions League and in the Liga F.

On 13 October 2025, Coll signed a contract extension until 2029.

== International career ==
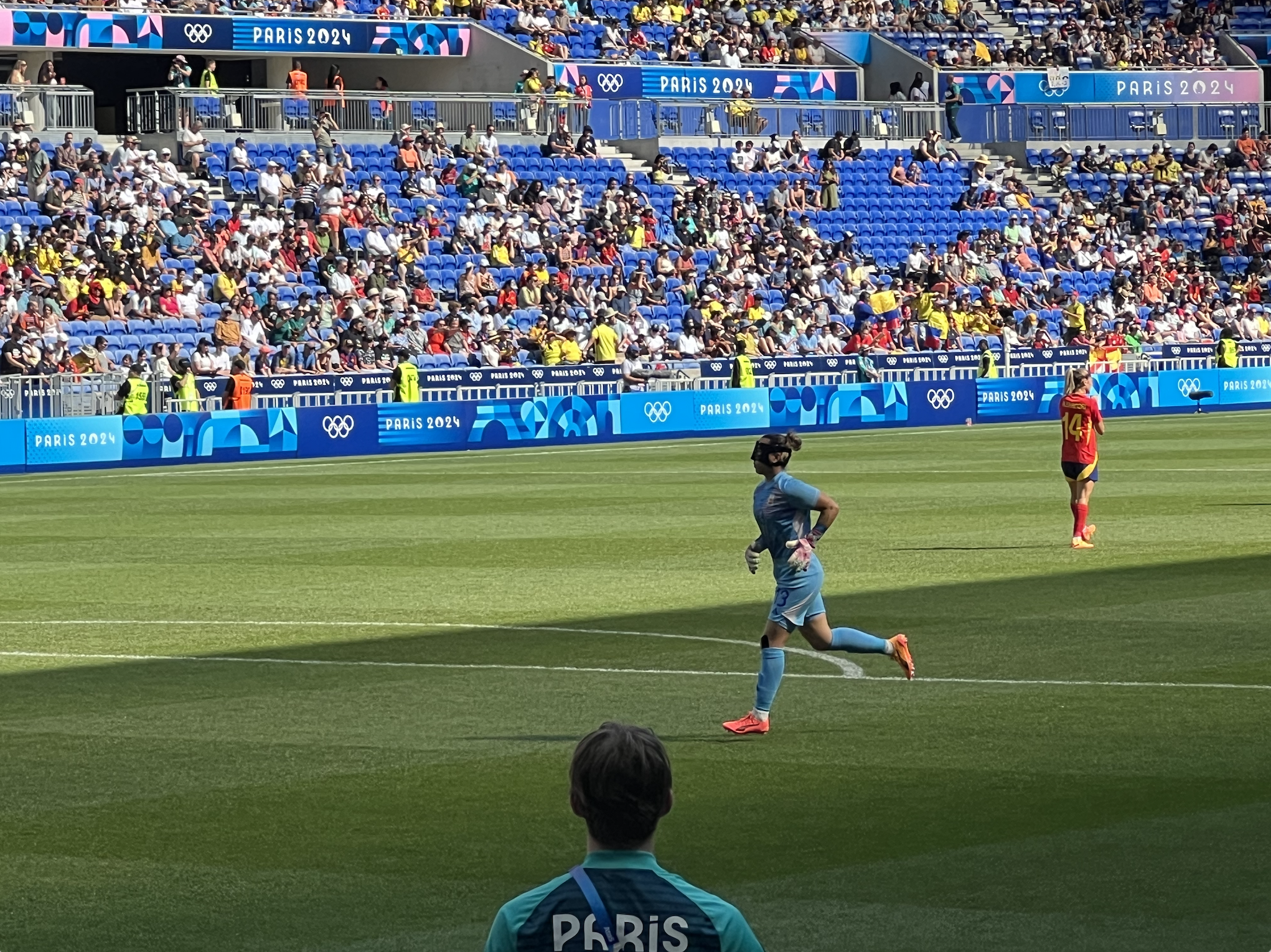
Coll before Spain's quarterfinal against Colombia at the 2024 Olympics.

In 2016, at the age of 15, she was selected to participate in the European Under-17 Championship in the Czech Republic. The team was runner-up after losing in the final against Germany. In May 2018, she was once again part of the Spanish team to play the European Under-17 Championship in Lithuania. This time, as she was already one of the team's captains, the Spanish team won the title of champions after defeating Germany in the final.

At the end of that same year, the red team traveled to Uruguay to play in the U17 World Cup. The team was proclaimed world champion for the first time after beating Mexico in the final. She was one of the heroines of the championship after saving two penalties from the shootout in the semifinal that they played against Korea that ended in a draw. At the end of the tournament, she was awarded the gold glove, an award that accredits her as the best goalkeeper in the entire competition.

In January 2020, she was called up by the U19 team to play the preparation matches for the Under-19 European Championship in Ireland. Due to COVID-19, UEFA announced that the tournament was cancelled.

In August 2018, she was the starting goalkeeper for the team that participated in the U20 World Cup in France. Coll was once again decisive during the tournament after saving a penalty in the semifinals against France. They were runners-up in the tournament after losing the final 1-3 against Japan.

She was named as part of Spain's national team for the 2023 FIFA Women's World Cup. After several games on the bench, she made her first appearance for the national team at the tournament in a round of 16 games against Switzerland, which Spain won 5–1. She started in goal in the final against England, finishing the match with a clean sheet in a 1–0 victory to claim the title.

On 10 June 2025, Coll was called up to the Spain squad for the UEFA Women's Euro 2025. On 27 July 2025, she started in the tournament's final and saved a retaken kick by Beth Mead in the penalty shootout as Spain lost 1–1 (3–1 on penalties) to England.

== Career statistics ==
=== Club ===
As of match played 7 June 2025

Appearances and goals by club, season and competition
Club	Season	League			Cup (Note: Including Copa de la Reina)		Other (Note: Including Supercopa de España)		Europe (Note: Including UEFA Women's Champions League)		Total	
Club	Season	Division	Apps	Goals	Apps	Goals	Apps	Goals	Apps	Goals	Apps	Goals
Barcelona	Primera División / Liga F	2019–20	0	0	1	0	—		—		1	0
Barcelona	Primera División / Liga F	2020–21	7	0	3	0	0	0	1	0	11	0
Barcelona	Primera División / Liga F	2021–22	8	0	0	0	0	0	1	0	9	0
Barcelona	Primera División / Liga F	2022–23	3	0	0	0	0	0	0	0	3	0
Barcelona	Primera División / Liga F	2023–24	15	0	1	0	2	0	7	0	25	0
Barcelona	Primera División / Liga F	2024–25	22	0	5	0	2	0	11	0	40	0
Barcelona	Primera División / Liga F	2025–26	0	0	0	0	0	0	0	0	0	0
Barcelona	Total		55	0	10	0	2	0	20	0	87	0
Sevilla (loan)	Primera División	2019–20	16	0	2	0	0	0	0	0	18	0
Career total			71	0	12	0	2	0	20	0	105	0

=== International ===
As of match played 26 February 2025

Appearances and goals by national team and year
National team	Year	Apps	Goals
Spain	2023	10	0
Spain	2024	10	0
Spain	2025	2	0
Total		22	0

== Honours ==
FC Barcelona

- Liga F: 2020–21, 2021–22, 2022–23, 2023–24, 2024–25, 2025–26
- Copa de la Reina: 2020–21, 2021–22, 2023–24, 2024–25, 2025–26
- Supercopa de España: 2021–22, 2022–23, 2023–24, 2024–25, 2025–26
- UEFA Women's Champions League: 2020–21, 2022–23, 2023–24, 2025–26

Spain U17

- FIFA U-17 Women's World Cup: 2018

Spain U20

- FIFA U-20 Women's World Cup runner-up: 2018

Spain

- FIFA Women's World Cup: 2023
- UEFA Women's Championship runner-up: 2025
- UEFA Women's Nations League: 2023–24, 2025

Individual

- FIFA U-17 Women's World Cup Golden Glove: 2018
- UEFA Women's Champions League Team of the Season: 2025–26
- IFFHS Women's UEFA Team: 2024
- IFFHS Women's Youth (U20) World Team: 2020, 2021
- IFFHS Women's Youth (U20) UEFA Team: 2020, 2021
- Barça Players' Award: 2025–26
- Women's Goalkeeper of the year 2026
