= 2023–24 Supercopa de España Femenina =

Spanish Women's Super Cup

Tournament details
- Host country: Spain
- City: Leganés
- Dates: 16–20 January 2024
- Teams: 4

Final positions
- Champions: Barcelona (4th title)
- Runners-up: Levante

Tournament statistics
- Matches played: 3
- Goals scored: 15 (5 per match)
- Attendance: 15,139 (5,046 per match)
- Top scorer: Salma Paralluelo (4 goals)

The 2023–24 Supercopa de España Femenina was the fifth edition of the current Supercopa de España Femenina, an annual women's football competition for clubs in the Spanish football league system that were successful in its major competitions in the preceding season.

Barcelona defended the title after defeating Levante 7–0 in the final, to win the competition for the third consecutive season and a record fourth time overall.

== Draw ==
The draw for the competition was held on 29 December 2023. On 15 January, the referees Ainara Andrea Acevedo Dudley and Marta Huerta de Aza were chosen to officiate in the semi-finals. The final took place at the Estadio Municipal de Butarque in Leganés on 20 January 2024, and was officiated by referee Olatz Rivera Olmedo.

== Qualification ==
The competition featured both finalists of the 2022–23 Copa de la Reina, as well as the next two highest-ranked clubs at the 2022–23 Liga F that had not already qualified through the cup final.

=== Qualified teams ===
The following four teams qualified for the tournament.

Team	Method of qualification
Barcelona	2022–23 Liga F winner
Atlético Madrid	2022–23 Copa de la Reina winner
Real Madrid	2022–23 Copa de la Reina runner-up
Levante	2022–23 Liga F third

== Matches ==
=== Bracket ===
Semi-finals
16 January 2024
Atlético Madrid	1
Levante (a.e.t.)	3
17 January 2024
Barcelona	4
Real Madrid	0

Final
20 January 2024
Levante	0
Barcelona	7

=== Semi-finals ===
16 January 2024
19:00

Atlético Madrid	1–3 (a.e.t.)	Levante
Ajibade 21'	Report	Sosa 8' (pen.); Nunes 116', 120+4'

Estadio Municipal de Butarque, Leganés
Attendance: 1,000
Referee: Ainara Andrea Acevedo Dudley (Barcelona)

17 January 2024
19:00

Barcelona	4–0	Real Madrid
Caldentey 12', 39' (pen.); Paralluelo 15', 52'	Report

Estadio Municipal de Butarque, Leganés
Attendance: 7,000
Referee: Marta Huerta de Aza (Tenerife)

=== Final ===
20 January 2024
20:00

Levante	0–7	Barcelona
	Report	Paralluelo 12', 45+2'; Hansen 24', 36', 54'; Batlle 26'; Bonmatí 57'

Estadio Municipal de Butarque, Leganés
Attendance: 7,139
Referee: Olatz Rivera Olmedo (Zaragoza)

Levante	Barcelona

GK	25	(Sweden) Emma Holmgren
DF	4	(Spain) María Méndez
DF	8	(Spain) Silvia Lloris
DF	19	(Spain) Núria Mendoza
DF	20	(Spain) Paula Tomás	(yellow card) 45'	(substituted off) 58'
MF	6	(Spain) Paula Fernández
MF	11	(Spain) Ángela Sosa		(substituted off) 58'
MF	12	(Spain) Leire Baños	(yellow card) 50'	(substituted off) 70'
FW	7	(Colombia) Mayra Ramírez		(substituted off) 58'
FW	9	(North Macedonia) Nataša Andonova
FW	10	(Spain) Alba Redondo		(substituted off) 70'
Substitutes:
GK	1	(Spain) María Valenzuela
GK	36	(Spain) Andrea Tarazona
DF	2	(Brazil) Antônia		(substituted in) 58'
DF	16	(Spain) Estela Carbonell
MF	14	(Spain) Daniela Arques		(substituted in) 58'
MF	21	(Spain) Anna Torrodà		(substituted in) 70'
FW	19	(Brazil) Gabi Nunes		(substituted in) 58'
FW	23	(Spain) Érika González		(substituted in) 70'
Manager:
(Spain) José Luis Sánchez Vera

GK	13	(Spain) Cata Coll
DF	2	(Spain) Irene Paredes	(substituted off) 45'
DF	15	(England) Lucy Bronze
DF	22	(Spain) Ona Batlle
DF	23	(Norway) Ingrid Engen
MF	12	(Spain) Patricia Guijarro	(substituted off) 63'
MF	14	(Spain) Aitana Bonmatí	(substituted off) 79'
MF	21	(England) Keira Walsh
FW	7	(Spain) Salma Paralluelo	(substituted off) 64'
FW	9	(Spain) Mariona Caldentey
FW	10	(Norway) Caroline Graham Hansen	(substituted off) 64'
Substitutes:
GK	24	(Spain) Gemma Font
DF	8	(Spain) Marta Torrejón
DF	34	(Spain) Martina Fernández	(substituted in) 45'
MF	24	(Netherlands) Esmee Brugts
MF	26	(Italy) Giulia Dragoni
MF	30	(Spain) Vicky López	(substituted in) 64'
FW	6	(Spain) Clàudia Pina	(substituted in) 63'
FW	19	(Spain) Bruna Vilamala	(substituted in) 79'
FW	20	(Nigeria) Asisat Oshoala	(substituted in) 64'
FW	40	(Spain) Lucía Corrales
Manager:
(Spain) Jonatan Giráldez

Most valuable player (MVP):
Caroline Graham Hansen (Barcelona)

Assistant referees:
Silvia Fernández Pérez
Rocío Puente Pino
Fourth official:
Zulema González González
Video assistant referee:
María Eugenia Gil Soriano
Assistant video assistant referees:
Judit Romano García

Match rules

- 90 minutes.
- 30 minutes of extra time if necessary.
- Penalty shoot-out if scores still level.
- Maximum of ten named substitutes.
- Maximum of five substitutions, with a sixth allowed in extra time. (Note: Each team was given only three opportunities to make substitutions, with a fourth opportunity in extra time, excluding substitutions made at half-time, before the start of extra time and at half-time in extra time.)
- Maximum of one concussion substitution.

== See also ==
- 2023–24 Liga F
- 2023–24 Copa de la Reina
