= 2025–26 FC Barcelona Femení season =

Barcelona Femení
2025–26 season
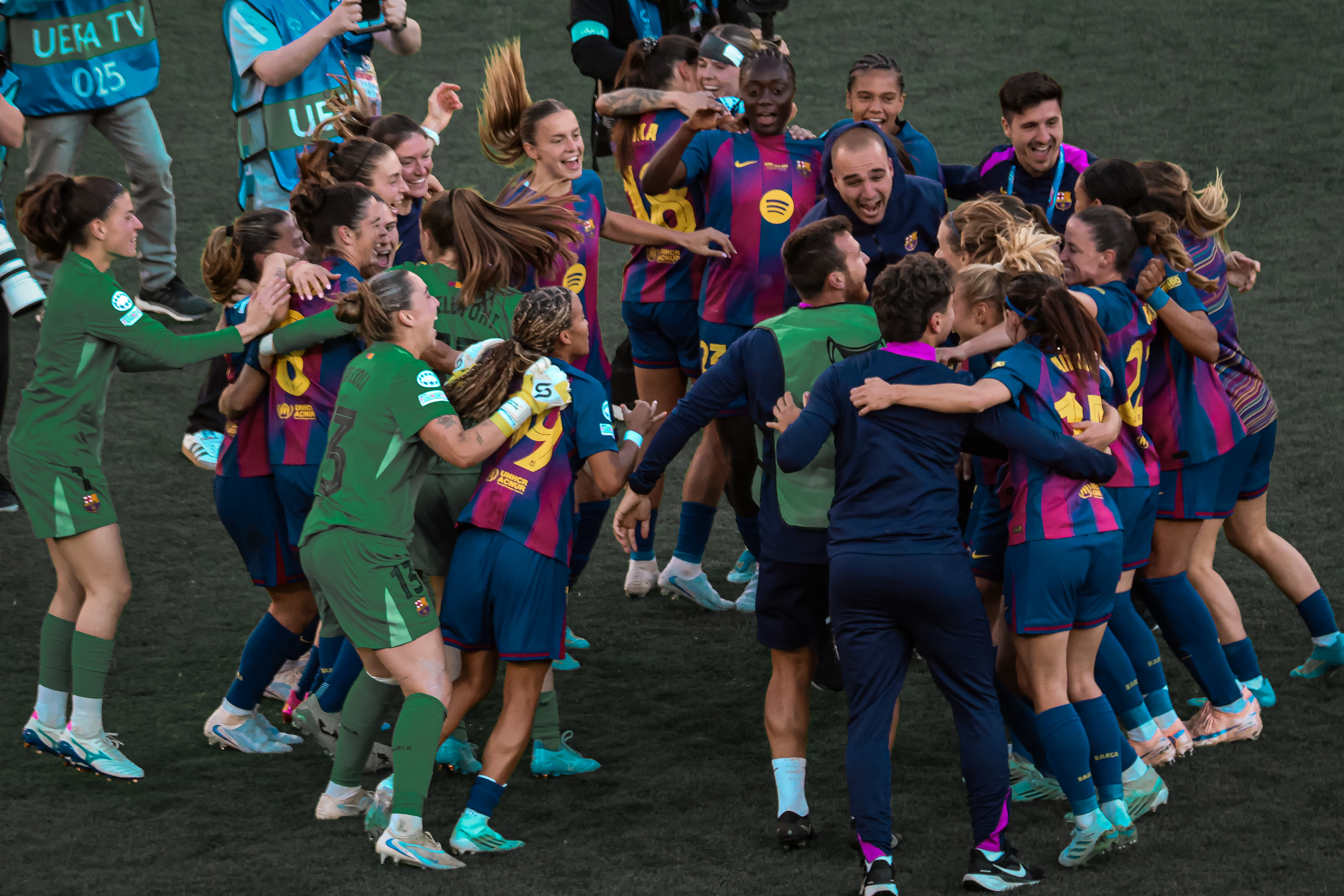
- The team celebrate winning the Champions League
- President: Joan Laporta
- Head coach: Pere Romeu
- Stadium: Johan Cruyff Stadium; Camp Nou (Selected matches)
- Liga F: Winners
- Copa de la Reina: Winners
- Supercopa de España: Winners
- UEFA Champions League: Winners
- Top goalscorer: League: Clàudia Pina (21); All: Ewa Pajor (32)
- Highest home attendance: 60,067 Barcelona 6–0 Real Madrid; 2 April 2026
- Lowest home attendance: 2,966; Barcelona 5–0 Levante; 6 May 2026
- Average home league attendance: 6,168
- Biggest win: Home: Barcelona 12–1 Madrid CFF Away: Athletic Club 1–8 Barcelona
- Biggest defeat: Real Sociedad 1–0 Barcelona
Home colours	Away colours	Third colours
- All statistics correct as of 31 May 2026.

The 2025–26 season was the 38th season in the history of FC Barcelona Femení. The team competed in and won each of the domestic league, the Copa de la Reina, the Supercopa de España Femenina and the UEFA Women's Champions League as the defending champion of the first three titles after winning a domestic treble in the previous season. The team played the final of the 2024–25 Copa Catalunya Femenina after its postponement, completing the quadruple, but were unable to enter the 2025–26 edition and defend the title due to rules changes.

Barcelona won the 2025-26 Supercopa de España Femenina on 24 January 2026 for their sixth record-extending title and won the league title for the seventh consecutive season and for the eleventh time overall on 22 April 2026.

On 23 May 2026, Barcelona completed the third continental treble and the second continental quadruple in the team's history by defeating Lyon 4–0 in the Champions League final, winning the Champions League for the fourth time overall.

== Kits ==
- Supplier: Nike
- Sponsors: Spotify (front) / Bimbo (left sleeve) / UNHCR – The UN Refugee Agency (back)

Home	Away	Third	Fourth

== Season overview ==
=== Transfer market ===
La Liga restrictions on the men's team's spending for financial fair play also account for the women's team's budget; due to this, Barcelona had a difficult 2025 transfer market. Prior to the end of the previous season, it was announced that they had signed former youth product Laia Aleixandri from Manchester City for free, though they also lost Ingrid Syrstad Engen to rivals OL Lyonnes for free. The future of returning loan players was questioned, and the club asked La Liga to separate the different sections' budgets, to a generally negative reception.

Barcelona then terminated the contracts of Ellie Roebuck and Fridolina Rolfö, to reduce the overall club's wage spending. The player departures, particularly Rolfö's, and plan to only sign Aleixandri were controversial; sporting director Marc Vivés tried to quell concerns by saying that the contract renovations for 2026 would be the "biggest reinforcements". However, Vivés and the club came under further criticism when they terminated the contract of Jana Fernández in August, leaving only seventeen first-team players after five major player losses without generating any income, to balance player registrations in the men's team. Concerns were also raised about the eight players up for contract renovation in 2026, and whether they would all be able to continue. A week later, it was reported that Fernández' transfer did command a fee, of up to €300,000, which would act as a safety margin for the team's finances ahead of renewing key players for 2026.

Due to the international popularity of the team, reactions to the player exodus came from global football pundits as well as fans, criticising FC Barcelona for seeming to prioritise rapid growth of the men's team over the continuation of their profitable and iconic women's team. The downsizing occurred at the same time other clubs and brands were entering or scaling up their ventures into women's football, with Barcelona – having been the most profitable women's team in 2024 – effectively exiting a growing market. Some pundits felt that FC Barcelona's support of the women's team was secure, but cuts had to be made for the financial health of the club, while others opined that savings by cutting women's team salaries would be negligible compared to the debt load.

=== August ===
Following the participation of many players at the UEFA Women's Euro 2025, Barcelona played the 2024–25 Copa Catalunya Femenina final and had a short August pre-season tour in Mexico. The 2025–26 Liga F season began at the end of August. Barcelona started with a good 8–0 win in a team victory that prominently featured B team registered players Clara Serrajordi and Aïcha Cámara.

== Players ==
=== First team ===
No.	Pos.	Nat.	Name	Age	EU	Since	App.	Goals	Ends	Notes
Goalkeepers
1	GK	(Spain)	Gemma Font	26	EU	2018	49	0	2027	Made in La Masia
13	GK	(Spain)	Cata Coll	25	EU	2019	121	0	2029	
37	GK	(Spain)	Txell Font	21	EU	2022	1	0	2025	Made in La Masia
Defenders
2	DF	(Spain)	Irene Paredes (4th captain)	34	EU	2021	180	19	2027	
4	DF	(Spain)	Mapi León	30	EU	2017	314	22	2026	
5	DF	(Spain)	Laia Aleixandri	25	EU	2025	21	4	2029	Made in La Masia
8	DF	(Spain)	Marta Torrejón (vice captain)	36	EU	2013	490	74	2026	
22	DF	(Spain)	Ona Batlle	26	EU	2023	114	14	2026	Made in La Masia
23	DF	(Spain)	Aïcha Cámara	19	EU	2023	43	1	2028	Made in La Masia
Midfielders
11	MF	(Spain)	Alexia Putellas (captain)	32	EU	2012	508	232	2026	Made in La Masia
12	MF	(Spain)	Patricia Guijarro (3rd captain)	28	EU	2015	376	75	2027	
14	MF	(Spain)	Aitana Bonmatí	28	EU	2016	339	118	2028	Made in La Masia
16	MF	(Spain)	Clara Serrajordi	18	EU	2024	45	2	2028	Made in La Masia
18	MF	(Portugal)	Kika Nazareth	23	EU	2024	71	19	2028	
19	MF	(Spain)	Vicky López	19	EU	2022	132	32	2028	Made in La Masia
24	MF	(Netherlands)	Esmee Brugts	22	EU	2023	126	28	2027	
Forwards
6	FW	(Switzerland)	Sydney Schertenleib	19	EU	2024	65	12	2027	
7	FW	(Spain)	Salma Paralluelo	22	EU	2022	131	74	2026	
9	FW	(Spain)	Clàudia Pina	24	EU	2017	222	103	2029	Made in La Masia
10	FW	(Norway)	Caroline Graham Hansen	31	EU	2019	231	109	2026	
17	FW	(Poland)	Ewa Pajor	29	EU	2024	87	75	2027	
First team players who left during the season
23	FW	(Spain)	Lucía Corrales	20	EU	2023	15	0	2026	Made in La Masia

- Last updated: 31 May 2026
- Source: FCBarcelona.com, LigaF.es, UEFA.com and ESPN
- Ordered by squad number.

=== Reserve team ===
Players from FC Barcelona Femení B and FC Barcelona Femení C who have a squad number and are eligible to play for the first team (those marked with an asterisk are in regular first team training).

As of 31 May 2026

N	Pos.	Nat.	Name	Age	EU	Since	App	Goals	Ends	Transfer fee	Notes
26	DF	(Portugal)	Iara Lobo	18	EU	2024	0	0			
27	FW	(Spain)	Celia Segura	19	EU	2024	2	0		Youth system	
28	MF	(Spain)	Alba Caño*	22	EU	2022	15	1	2025	Youth system	
29	FW	(Spain)	Lúa Arufe	17	EU	2024	2	0			
31	MF	(Spain)	Rosalía Domínguez	17	EU	2024	3	0			
32	DF	(Spain)	Maria Llorella	20	EU	2022	4	0		Youth system	
33	DF	(Spain)	Noah Bezis Ureña	20	EU	2023	0	0	2025	Youth system	
35	FW	(Norway)	Martine Fenger*	19	EU	2023	15	3			
38	FW	(Spain)	Laia Martret	20	EU	2023	2	0	2026	Youth system	
39	MF	(Spain)	Ainoa Gómez	19	EU	2024	4	1		Youth system	
40	DF	(Spain)	Adriana Ranera*	20	EU	2022	10	0		Youth system	
41	DF	(Spain)	Martina González	18	EU	2023	1	0	2026	Youth system	
42	FW	(Spain)	Natalia Escot	19	EU	2024	1	0			
43	DF	(Spain)	Carla Julià*	19	EU	2025	21	6	2027		
44	FW	(Spain)	Anna Quer	18	EU	2025	0	0			
	GK	(Spain)	Rocío Romano	18	EU	2023	0	0		Youth system	

- Last updated: 31 May 2026
- Source: FCBarcelona.com, LigaF.es, UEFA.com and ESPN
- Ordered by squad number.

=== Contract renewals ===
No.	Pos.	Nat.	Name	Date	Until	Source
	DF	(Spain)	Noa Jiménez	27 June 2025		
1	GK	(Spain)	Gemma Font	30 June 2025	2027	
8	DF	(Spain)	Marta Torrejón	30 June 2025	2026	
9	FW	(Spain)	Clàudia Pina	20 August 2025	2029	
13	GK	(Spain)	Cata Coll	20 August 2025	2029	
38	MF	(Poland)	Emilia Szymczak	4 September 2025	2029	
16	MF	(Spain)	Clara Serrajordi	6 February 2026	2028	
23	DF	(Spain)	Aïcha Cámara	6 February 2026	2028	

== Transfers ==
=== In ===
No.	Pos.	Nat.	Player	Moving from	Type	Fee	Source
Summer
23	FW	(Spain)	Lucía Corrales	Sevilla	Loan return		
	MF	(Italy)	Giulia Dragoni	(Italy) AS Roma	Loan return		
–	FW	(Spain)	Bruna Vilamala	(England) Brighton & Hove Albion	Loan return		
20	DF	(Spain)	Martina Fernández	(England) Everton	Loan return		
5	DF	(Spain)	Laia Aleixandri	(England) Manchester City	Transfer	Free	
43	DF	(Spain)	Carla Julià	Levante Badalona	Transfer		
28	MF	(Spain)	Alba Caño	(United States) Boston Legacy	Loan		
Winter
38	MF	(Poland)	Emilia Szymczak	(England) Liverpool	Loan return		
Total				€000,000			

=== Out ===
No.	Pos.	Nat.	Player	Moving to	Type	Fee	Source
Summer
23	MF	(Norway)	Ingrid Syrstad Engen	(France) OL Lyonnes	End of contract		
36	GK	(Spain)	Meri Muñoz	Espanyol	Transfer	Free	
35	DF	(Spain)	Judit Pujols	(Germany) VfL Wolfsburg	Transfer	Free	
–	MF	(Poland)	Weronika Araśniewicz	(Germany) VfL Wolfsburg	Loan		
25	GK	(England)	Ellie Roebuck	(England) Aston Villa	Contract termination		
16	DF	(Sweden)	Fridolina Rolfö	(England) Manchester United	Contract termination		
33	FW	(Spain)	Ona Baradad	Espanyol	End of contract		
–	FW	(Spain)	Bruna Vilamala	(Mexico) Club América	Transfer	Undisclosed fee	
–	MF	(United States)	Onyeka Gamero	(United States) Bay FC	Transfer	Undisclosed fee	
20	DF	(Spain)	Martina Fernández	(England) Everton	Transfer	Undisclosed fee	
–	FW	(Spain)	Noa Ortega	Atlético Madrid	Transfer		
–	DF	(Spain)	Laura Martín	Villarreal	Loan		
28	MF	(Spain)	Alba Caño	(United States) Boston Legacy	Transfer (Note: Caño will remain on loan at Barcelona until January 2026, when Boston Legacy begin their inaugural NWSL season.)	Undisclosed fee	
5	DF	(Spain)	Jana Fernández	(England) London City Lionesses	Transfer (Note: This departure was variously reported as a contract termination and a fee-paying transfer for which Barcelona received at least €250,000 in different reports around the time.)	€300,000	
	MF	(Italy)	Giulia Dragoni	(Italy) AS Roma	Loan		
23	FW	(Spain)	Lucía Corrales	(England) London City Lionesses	Transfer (Note: Fee was the destination club paying the contract release clause)	€500,000	
38	MF	(Poland)	Emilia Szymczak	(England) Liverpool	Loan		
Winter
28	MF	(Spain)	Alba Caño	(United States) Boston Legacy	Loan return		
Total				€800,000			

=== Transfer summary ===
Undisclosed fees are not included in the transfer totals.

Expenditure ▼

Summer: €000,000

Winter: €000,000

Total expenditure: €000,000

Income ▲

Summer: €800,000

Winter: €000,000

Total income: €800,000

Net totals

Summer: ▲€800,000

Winter: ▲€000,000

Total: ▲€800,000

== Pre-season and friendlies ==
Win Draw Loss Fixtures

22 August 2025 All-Star Game	Liga MX Femenil All-Stars (Mexico)	2–2 (3–4 p)	(Spain) Barcelona	Monterrey, Mexico
21:00 CT (UTC-5)	Ribeiro 27', (yellow card) 45'; Guerrero 81'	Report	Blackwood 29' (o.g.); Bonmatí 57'	Stadium: Estadio Universitario; Referee: Karen Hernández
	Penalties
	Cervantes (penalty scored); Jaramillo (penalty missed); Chule (penalty scored); García (penalty scored); Ceceña (penalty missed)		(penalty scored) Putellas; (penalty scored) Pina; (penalty scored) Torrejon; (penalty scored) Bonmatí
Note: The match was postponed due to weather conditions and started at 22:20 local time.

24 August 2025 Friendly	Club América (Mexico)	1–2	(Spain) Barcelona	Mexico City, Mexico
12:00 CT (UTC-5)	Camberos 79'	Report	Pina 40'; Paredes (yellow card) 65'; Paralluelo 74'	Stadium: Estadio Ciudad de los Deportes; Attendance: 25,165; Referee: Lizzet Amairany García Olvera

== Competitions ==
=== Overall record ===
Competition	First match	Last match	Starting round	Final position	Record							
Competition	First match	Last match	Starting round	Final position	Pld	W	D	L	GF	GA	GD	Win %
Liga F	30 August 2025	31 May 2026	Matchday 1	Winners	30	29	0	1	130	9	+121	96.67
Copa de la Reina	21 December 2025	16 May 2026	Round of 16	Winners	5	4	1	0	17	3	+14	80.00
Supercopa de España Femenina	21 January 2026	24 January 2026	Semi-finals	Winners	2	2	0	0	5	1	+4	100.00
UEFA Women's Champions League	7 October 2025	23 May 2026	League phase	Winners	11	9	2	0	41	8	+33	81.82
Total					48	44	3	1	193	21	+172	91.67

Last updated: 31 May 2026
Source: Competitions

Current position
Competition won

=== Liga F ===
==== League table ====
Pos	Team	Pld	W	D	L	GF	GA	GD	Pts	Qualification or relegation
1	Barcelona (C)	30	29	0	1	130	9	+121	87	Qualification for the Champions League league phase
2	Real Madrid	30	23	3	4	65	18	+47	72	Qualification for the Champions League third qualifying round
3	Real Sociedad	30	20	6	4	61	27	+34	66	Qualification for the Champions League third qualifying round
4	Tenerife	30	14	12	4	49	22	+27	54	
5	Atlético Madrid	30	14	9	7	63	39	+24	51	

Updated to match(es) played on 31 May 2026. Source: LigaF.es
Rules for classification: 1) Points; 2) Head-to-head points; 3) Goal difference; 4) Number of goals scored
(C) Champions

==== Results summary ====
Overall								Home						Away					
Pld	W	D	L	GF	GA	GD	Pts	W	D	L	GF	GA	GD	W	D	L	GF	GA	GD
30	29	0	1	130	9	+121	87	15	0	0	75	4	+71	14	0	1	55	5	+50

Last updated: 31 May 2026.
Source: La Liga

==== Results by round ====
Round	1	2	3	4	5	6	7	8	9	10	11	12	13	14	15	16	17	18	19	20	21	22	23	24	25	26	27	28	29	30
Ground	H	A	H	A	H	A	A	H	A	H	H	A	H	A	H	A	H	H	A	H	A	A	H	A	H	A	H	A	H	A
Result	W	W	W	W	W	W	W	W	L	W	W	W	W	W	W	W	W	W	W	W	W	W	W	W	W	W	W	W	W	W
Position	1	1	1	1	1	1	1	1	1	1	1	1	1	1	1	1	1	1	1	1	1	1	1	1	1	1	1	1	1	1
Points	3	6	9	12	15	18	21	24	24	27	30	33	36	39	42	45	48	51	54	57	60	63	66	69	72	75	78	81	84	87

Updated to match(es) played on 31 May 2026. Source: La Liga
A = Away; H = Home; W = Win; D = Draw; L = Loss; P = Postponed

==== Matches ====
30 August 2025 1	Barcelona	8–0	Alhama	Sant Joan Despí
20:00 CEST	Hansen 5', 57'; Bonmatí 11'; Pajor 28'; Batlle 45+1'; Pina 71', 73', 90+9'	Report	Toro (yellow card) 25'	Stadium: Johan Cruyff Stadium; Attendance: 3,248; Referee: María Eugenia Gil Soriano

7 September 2025 2	Athletic Club	1–8	Barcelona	Bilbao
12:00 CEST	Zubieta 51'	Report	López 15', 80'; Guijarro 51'; Pajor 23', 40'; Kika 46'; Bonmatí 60', 89'	Stadium: San Mamés Stadium; Attendance: 11,030; Referee: Elisabeth Calvo Valentín

12 September 2025 3	Barcelona	4–0	Dux Logroño	Sant Joan Despí
20:00 CEST	Bonmatí 21', 24'; Pajor 42'; Kika 68'; León (yellow card) 84'	Report	Asenjo (yellow card) 65'	Stadium: Johan Cruyff Stadium; Attendance: 2,923; Referee: Raquel Suárez González

21 September 2025 4	Sevilla	0–5	Barcelona	Seville
16:00 CEST	Kanteh (yellow card) 23'; Llamas (yellow card) 90+1'	Report	Paralluelo 19'; Pina 39', 74' (pen.), 90+6'; López 49'	Stadium: Estadio Jesús Navas; Attendance: 1,856; Referee: Paola Cebollada López

27 September 2025 5	Barcelona	2–0	Espanyol	Sant Joan Despí
18:30 CEST	Putellas 21'; Pajor 55'	Report	Vallejo (yellow card) 15'	Stadium: Johan Cruyff Stadium; Attendance: 4,865; Referee: Elisabeth Calvo Valentín

4 October 2025 6	Eibar	0–4	Barcelona	Eibar
15:00 CEST		Report	Serrajordi 14'; López 54'; Hansen 73'; Paralluelo 90+7'	Stadium: Ipurúa; Attendance: 1,143; Referee: Alicia Espinosa Ríos

12 October 2025 7	Atlético Madrid	0–6	Barcelona	Madrid
12:00 CEST	Fernández (yellow card) 59'; Sarriegi (yellow card) 79'; Pérez (yellow card) 80'; Gaby (yellow card) 90+6'	Report	Brugts 2'; Guijarro 41'; Pajor 53'; Putellas 63'; López 85'; Aleixandri 90+7'	Stadium: Centro Deportivo Wanda Alcalá de Henares; Attendance: 2,116; Referee: María Eugenia Gil Soriano

19 October 2025 8	Barcelona	2–0	Granada	Sant Joan Despí
18:00 CEST	Pina 52'; Kika 87'	Report		Stadium: Johan Cruyff Stadium; Attendance: 4,350; Referee: Melissa López Osorio

2 November 2025 9	Real Sociedad	1–0	Barcelona	Zubieta
16:00 CET	Imade 37' (pen.); Morazza (yellow card) 80'	Report	Paredes (yellow card) 82'; Brugts (yellow card) 90'	Stadium: Zubieta Facilities; Attendance: 1,875; Referee: Alicia Espinosa Ríos

9 November 2025 10	Barcelona	8–0	Deportivo Abanca	Sant Joan Despí
12:00 CET	López 16'; Putellas 18'; León 22'; Aleixandri 28', 32'; Pina 36'; Schertenleib 41'; Hansen 45+2'; Serrajordi (yellow card) 90+1'	Report	Gutiérrez (yellow card) 81'	Stadium: Johan Cruyff Stadium; Attendance: 3,165; Referee: Elisabeth Calvo Valentín

15 November 2025 11	Barcelona	4–0	Real Madrid	Barcelona
16:00 CET	Putellas (yellow card) 28'; Pajor 15', 30'; Romeu (yellow card) 59'; Serrajordi (yellow card) 89'; Schertenleib 90+1'; Bonmatí 90+4'	Report	Yasmim (yellow card) 52'; Däbritz (yellow card) 53'; Weir (penalty missed) 81'; García (yellow card) 88'; Dorado (yellow card) 89'; Navaroo (yellow card) 90+2'; Comendador (yellow card) 90+6'	Stadium: Estadi Olímpic Lluís Companys; Attendance: 36,276; Referee: Paola Cebollada López
Note: Victor Zamora, fitness coach was sent-off (78') for protesting while on the bench.

23 November 2025 12	Levante	0–4	Barcelona	Valencia
18:00 CET		Report	Pajor 14'; Pina (penalty missed) 29', 72' (pen.); Nazareth 51'; Putellas 90+8' (pen.)	Stadium: Estadi Ciutat de València; Attendance: 6,222; Referee: Lorena del Mar Trujillano

6 December 2025 13	Barcelona	2–0	Tenerife	Sant Joan Despí
15:00 CET	Serrajordi (yellow card) 29'; Paredes (yellow card) 51'; Pajor 83'; Putellas 87'	Report		Stadium: Johan Cruyff Stadium; Attendance: 3,476; Referee: Beatriz Cuesta Arribas

13 December 2025 14	Badalona Women	1–5	Barcelona	Palamós
15:00 CET	Lorena 13'; Julve (yellow card) 24'	Report	Pajor 5'; Pina 38'; Julià 59'; López 76'; Brugts 90+12'	Stadium: Estadi Palamós Costa Brava; Attendance: 2,853; Referee: Raquel Suárez González

10 January 2026 15	Barcelona	12–1	Madrid CFF	Sant Joan Despí
19:00 CET	Pajor 9', 21', 38', 58'; Julià 25'; Schertenleib 29', 71'; Brugts 43'; Mendoza 45+1' (o.g.); Putellas 52' (pen.); Gómez 68'; Pina 81'	Report	Nautnes 49'	Stadium: Johan Cruyff Stadium; Attendance: 4,743; Referee: Olatz Rivera Olmedo

14 January 2026 17	Barcelona	5–0	Atlético Madrid	Sant Joan Despí
19:00 CET	Putellas 4'; Pina 13', 74'; Brugts 59'; Paralluelo 90+2'	Report	Bøe Risa (yellow card) 56'; Peñalvo (yellow card) 81'	Stadium: Johan Cruyff Stadium; Attendance: 3,529; Referee: María Gloria Planes Terol
Note: Matchday advanced due to both clubs participating in the 2025–26 Supercopa de España Femenina.

18 January 2026 16	Alhama	0–2	Barcelona	Lorca
12:00 CET	Martínez (yellow card) 90+1'	Report	Pina 22'; Coll (yellow card) 71'; Hansen 72'	Stadium: Estadio Francisco Artés Carrasco; Attendance: 3,618; Referee: Alicia Espinosa Ríos
Note: Cata Coll and goalkeeper coach Oriol Casares received yellow cards while on the bench.

1 February 2026 18	Barcelona	4–1	Sevilla	Sant Joan Despí
16:30 CET	Nazareth 24', 73'; Schertenleib 31'; Paralluelo 63'	Report	Márquez (yellow card) 41'; Izquierdo 85'	Stadium: Johan Cruyff Stadium; Attendance: 5,089; Referee: Melissa López Osorio

8 February 2026 19	Dux Logroño	0–3	Barcelona	Logroño
18:00 CET		Report	Julià 50'; Nazareth 52'; López 56'	Stadium: Estadio Las Gaunas; Attendance: 4,454; Referee: Eugenia Gil Soriano

14 February 2026 20	Barcelona	4–0	Eibar	Sant Joan Despí
18:30 CET	Pajor 13'; Pina (yellow card) 20', (goal) 35'; Guijarro 40'; Paredes (yellow card) 56', (goal) 61'; Graham (yellow card) 82'	Report	Camino (yellow card) 26'; Clement (yellow card) 73'; Valej (yellow card) 85'	Stadium: Johan Cruyff Stadium; Attendance: 3,733; Referee: Andrea Fírvida Fernández

21 February 2026 21	Granada	0–2	Barcelona	Granada
18:15 CET	Pérez (yellow card) 88'	Report	Graham 12' (pen.); Cámara 27'	Stadium: Nuevo Estadio de Los Cármenes; Attendance: 5,100; Referee: Raquel Suárez González

15 March 2026 22	Deportivo Abanca	0–2	Barcelona	A Coruña
12:00 CET	Pizarro (yellow card) 35'	Report	Schertenleib (yellow card) 10'; Torrejón 65'; Putellas 78'; Brugts (yellow card) 90+3'	Stadium: Riazor; Attendance: 4,359; Referee: Melissa López Osorio

21 March 2026 23	Barcelona	7–1	Athletic Club	Sant Joan Despí
19:00 CET	Paralluelo 11'; Pina 15', 58'; Julià 41'; Schertenleib 45+3'; Kika (yellow card) 53', (goal) 80', 82'	Report	Valero (yellow card) 31'; Agote 69'	Stadium: Johan Cruyff Stadium; Attendance: 4,736; Referee: María Gloria Planes Terol

29 March 2026 24	Real Madrid	0–3	Barcelona	Madrid
21:00 CEST	Lakrar (yellow card) 13'; Toletti (yellow card) 75'	Report	Batlle 18'; Putellas 51'; Lakrar 55' (o.g.)	Stadium: Alfredo Di Stéfano Stadium; Attendance: 3,396; Referee: Olatz Rivera Olmedo

6 April 2026 25	Barcelona	6–0	Badalona Women	Sant Joan Despí
19:00 CEST	Paralluelo 18' (pen.); Torrejón 50'; Schertenleib 52'; Brugts 60'; León 73'; Fenger 79'	Report	Llompart (yellow card) 24'	Stadium: Johan Cruyff Stadium; Attendance: 3,008; Referee: Ylenia Sánchez Miguel

22 April 2026 26	Espanyol	1–4	Barcelona	Sant Adrià de Besòs
19:00 CEST	Ballesté 28' (pen.); Amaia (yellow card) 39'	Report	Julià 2', (yellow card) 74'; Graham 30'; Fenger 56', 83'; Torrejón (yellow card) 68'	Stadium: Ciutat Esportiva Dani Jarque; Attendance: 938; Referee: Ainara Andrea Acevedo Dudley

6 May 2026 27	Barcelona	5–0	Levante	Sant Joan Despí
18:45 CEST	López 15'; Pina 34', 50'; Julià 66'; Schertenleib 86'	Report	Carrasco (yellow card) 39'	Stadium: Johan Cruyff Stadium; Attendance: 2,966; Referee: Raquel Suárez González

10 May 2026 28	Tenerife	1–3	Barcelona	Santa Cruz de Tenerife
19:00 CEST	Gramaglia 23'; Quiles (red card) 32'	Report	Putellas (yellow card) 27'; Brugts (yellow card) 27', (goal) 45+4'; León (yellow card) 47'; Kika 66'; Pina 88'	Stadium: Estadio Heliodoro Rodríguez López; Attendance: 11,647; Referee: Andrea Fírvida Fernández

27 May 2026 29	Barcelona	2–1	Real Sociedad	Sant Joan Despí
19:00 CEST	Pina 14'; Bonmatí 34'	Report	Ramírez 26'; Marcos (yellow card) 62'	Stadium: Johan Cruyff Stadium; Attendance: 5,428; Referee: María Eugenia Gil Soriano

31 May 2026 30	Madrid CFF	0–4	Barcelona	Fuenlabrada
16:00 CEST		Report	Graham 14', 25' (pen.), 76'; López 87'	Stadium: Estadio Fernando Torres; Attendance: 1,152; Referee: Paola Cebollada López

=== UEFA Women's Champions League ===
==== League phase ====
Pos	Team	Pld	W	D	L	GF	GA	GD	Pts	Qualification
1	(Royal Spanish Football Federation) Barcelona	6	5	1	0	20	3	+17	16	Advance to the quarter-finals (seeded)
2	(French Football Federation) OL Lyonnes	6	5	1	0	18	5	+13	16	Advance to the quarter-finals (seeded)
3	(The Football Association) Chelsea	6	4	2	0	20	3	+17	14	Advance to the quarter-finals (seeded)
4	(German Football Association) Bayern Munich	6	4	1	1	14	13	+1	13	Advance to the quarter-finals (seeded)
5	(The Football Association) Arsenal	6	4	0	2	11	6	+5	12	Advance to the knockout phase play-offs (seeded)

Source: UEFA
Rules for classification: League phase tiebreakers

Round	1	2	3	4	5	6
Ground	H	A	H	A	H	A
Result	W	W	W	D	W	W
Position	1	1	1	1	1	1
Points	3	6	9	10	13	16

Source: UEFA
A = Away; H = Home; W = Win; D = Draw; L = Loss

7 October 2025 1	Barcelona (Spain)	7–1	(Germany) Bayern Munich	Sant Joan Despí
21:00 CEST	Putellas 4'; Pajor 12', 56'; Brugts 27'; Paralluelo 45+1'; Pina 88', 90+2'	Report	Stanway (yellow card) 29'; Bühl 32'	Stadium: Johan Cruyff Stadium; Attendance: 4,409; Referee: Silvia Gasperotti (Italy)

15 October 2025 2	Roma (Italy)	0–4	(Spain) Barcelona	Rome, Italy
21:00 CEST	Corelli (yellow card) 90+4'	Report	Brugts 2'; Nazareth 58'; Putellas (penalty missed) 51', 71' (pen.); Hansen 90'	Stadium: Stadio Tre Fontane; Attendance: 2,731; Referee: Ivana Martinčić (Croatia)

12 November 2025 3	Barcelona (Spain)	3–0	(Belgium) OH Leuven	Sant Joan Despí
18:45 CET	Putellas 45+1' (pen.); Aleixandri (yellow card) 54'; Everaerts 56' (o.g.); Paredes 67'	Report	Veefkind (yellow card) 44'; Conijnenberg (yellow card) 90+2'	Stadium: Johan Cruyff Stadium; Attendance: 3,356; Referee: Riem Hussein (Germany)

20 November 2025 4	Chelsea (England)	1–1	(Spain) Barcelona	London, England
21:00 CET	Carpenter 16'	Report	Pajor 24'	Stadium: Stamford Bridge; Attendance: 11,137; Referee: Tess Olofsson (Sweden)

10 December 2025 5	Barcelona (Spain)	3–1	(Portugal) Benfica	Sant Joan Despí
18:45 CET	Pajor 29'; Ucheibe 54' (o.g.); Aleixandri 58'; Putellas (penalty missed) 74'	Report	Davidson 46'; Amado (yellow card) 90+4'	Stadium: Johan Cruyff Stadium; Attendance: 3,271; Referee: Jana Adámková (Czech Republic)

17 December 2025 6	Paris FC (France)	0–2	(Spain) Barcelona	Paris, France
21:00 CET		Report	López 22'; Hansen 49'	Stadium: Stade Jean-Bouin; Attendance: 15,207; Referee: Iuliana Demetrescu (Romania)

==== Knockout phase ====
===== Quarter-finals =====
25 March 2026 First leg	Real Madrid (Spain)	2–6	(Spain) Barcelona	Madrid
18:45 CET (UTC+1)	Caicedo 30', 66'	Report	Pajor 6', 57'; Brugts 13'; Paredes 32'; López 64'; Romeu (yellow card) 77'; Putellas 89' (pen.)	Stadium: Alfredo Di Stéfano Stadium; Attendance: 4,203; Referee: Maria Sole Ferrieri Caputi (Italy)

2 April 2026 Second leg	Barcelona (Spain)	6–0 (12–2 agg.)	(Spain) Real Madrid	Barcelona
18:45 CEST (UTC+2)	Putellas 8'; Graham 15', 55'; Paredes 27'; Pajor 34'; Brugts 74'	Report	Toletti (yellow card) 17'; Yasmim (yellow card) 20'; Athenea (yellow card) 48'; Feller (yellow card) 50'	Stadium: Camp Nou; Attendance: 60,067; Referee: Stéphanie Frappart (France)

===== Semi-finals =====
25 April 2026 First leg	Bayern Munich (Germany)	1–1	(Spain) Barcelona	Munich, Germany
18:15 CEST (UTC+2)	Kett 69', (red card) 80'; Mahmutovic (yellow card) 90+1'	Report	Pajor 8'; López (yellow card) 18'; Guijarro (yellow card) 83'; Serrajordi (yellow card) 90+4'	Stadium: Allianz Arena; Attendance: 31,000; Referee: Ivana Martinčić (Croatia)

3 May 2026 Second leg	Barcelona (Spain)	4–2 (5–3 agg.)	(Germany) Bayern Munich	Barcelona
16:30 CEST (UTC+2)	Paralluelo 13'; Putellas 22', 58', (yellow card) 66'; Pajor 54'	Report	Dallmann 17'; Stanway (yellow card) 29'; Harder 71'	Stadium: Camp Nou; Attendance: 60,021; Referee: Stéphanie Frappart (France)

===== Final =====
23 May 2026	Barcelona (Spain)	4–0	(France) Lyon	Oslo, Norway
18:00 CEST	Pajor 55', 69'; Putellas (yellow card) 68'; Cata (yellow card) 88'; Paralluelo 90', 90+3'	Report	Dumornay (yellow card) 73'	Stadium: Ullevaal Stadion; Attendance: 24,258; Referee: Tess Olofsson (Sweden)

=== Copa de la Reina ===
Barcelona entered the competition in the Round of 16.

21 December 2025 Round of 16	Alavés	1–6	Barcelona	Vitoria-Gasteiz
19:00 CET (UTC+1)	Sobrón 45+1'	Report	Nazareth 21'; Schertenleib 41'; Hansen 59'; Izal 75' (o.g.); Serrajordi 82'; García 86' (o.g.)	Stadium: Ciudad Deportiva José Luis Compañón; Attendance: 1,057; Referee: Melissa López Osorio

5 February 2026 Quarter-finals	Real Madrid	0–4	Barcelona	Madrid
21:00 CET (UTC+1)	Navarro (yellow card) 36'; Dorado (yellow card) 85'	Report	Putellas 21'; Pajor 68', 81'; Pina (yellow card) 71'; Paralluelo 74'	Stadium: Alfredo Di Stéfano Stadium; Attendance: 3,765; Referee: Lorena del Mar Trujillano
Note: Pere Romeu and Real Madrid assistant coach Antonio Rodriguez both received yellow cards while on the bench.

12 March 2026 Semi-finals - first leg	Badalona Women	0–0	Barcelona	Badalona
21:00 CET (UTC+1)	Pinillos (yellow card) 81'	Report		Stadium: Estadio municipal de Badalona; Referee: Alicia Espinosa Ríos

18 March 2026 Semi-finals - second leg	Barcelona	4–1	Badalona Women	Sant Joan Despí
21:00 CET (UTC+1)	Putellas 45+1', 62' (pen.); Kika 67'; Serrajordi (yellow card) 76'; Pajor 87'	Report	Pinillos (yellow card) 43'; Chamorro 80'	Stadium: Johan Cruyff Stadium; Attendance: 2,586; Referee: Lorena Del Mar Trujillano

16 May 2026 Final	Barcelona	3–1	Atlético Madrid	Las Palmas
21:00 CEST (UTC+2)	Pina 23'; Brugts 31', (yellow card) 81'; Paralluelo 37'; Serrajordi (yellow card) 82'	Report	Gallardo (yellow card) 52'; Bøe Risa 58'; Gio (yellow card) 74'; Otermín (yellow card) 86'	Stadium: Gran Canaria Stadium; Attendance: 26,093; Referee: Olatz Rivera Olmedo

=== Supercopa de España Femenina ===
21 January 2026 Semifinal	Barcelona	3–1	Athletic Club	Castellón de la Plana
19:00 CET (UTC+1)	Batlle 34'; Paredes 38'; Nazareth (red card) 45+5'; Pajor 68'	Report	Nevado 24' (pen.)	Stadium: Nou Estadi Castàlia; Attendance: 6,000; Referee: Elisabeth Calvo

24 January 2026 Final	Barcelona	2–0	Real Madrid	Castellón de la Plana
19:00 CET (UTC+1)	Brugts 28'; Putellas 90+3' (pen.)	Report	Lakrar (yellow card) 90+6'; Navarro (yellow card) 90+9'	Stadium: Nou Estadi Castàlia; Attendance: 12,593; Referee: Eugenia Gil Soriano

=== Copa Catalunya Femenina ===
Barcelona played, and won, the final of the previous season's Copa Catalunya Femenina in August 2025. They were unable to take part in the 2025–26 Copa Catalunya Femenina to defend this title, due to the competition once again excluding professional teams.

16 August 2025 Final	Barcelona	1–0	Levante Badalona	Peralada
21:00 CET (UTC+1)	Cámara (yellow card) 45'; Pajor 54'	Report	González (yellow card) 4'	Stadium: Camp Municipal de Perelada; Attendance: 1,110; Referee: Irene López Brustenga

== Statistics ==
=== Overall ===
As of 31 May 2026

No..	Pos.	Nat.	Player	Liga F		Copa de la Reina		Supercopa de España		Copa Catalunya		Champions League		Total		Discipline		Notes
No..	Pos.	Nat.	Player	Apps	Goals	Apps	Goals	Apps	Goals	Apps	Goals	Apps	Goals	Apps	Goals	Yellow card	Red card	Notes
Goalkeepers
1	GK	(Spain)	Gemma Font	12	0	3	0	0	0	1	0	0	0	16	0	0	0	
13	GK	(Spain)	Cata Coll	17	0	2	0	2	0	0	0	11	0	32	0	2	0	
37 (Note: Wore #13 and #25 in pre-season)	GK	(Spain)	Txell Font	1	0	0	0	0	0	0	0	0	0	1	0	0	0	
Defenders
2	DF	(Spain)	Irene Paredes	18+4	1	3	0	2	1	0	0	9+1	3	37	5	3	0	
4	DF	(Spain)	Mapi León	14+5	2	1	0	2	0	1	0	9+1	0	33	2	2	0	
5	DF	(Spain)	Laia Aleixandri	8+6	3	2	0	0	0	0	0	5	1	21	4	1	0	
8	DF	(Spain)	Marta Torrejón	17+4	2	1+2	0	0	0	1	0	0+1	0	26	2	1	0	
22	DF	(Spain)	Ona Batlle	16+6	2	4	0	2	1	0	0	9	0	37	3	0	0	
23 (Note: Wore #2 and #15 in pre-season. Started with #26 before her transfer to the first team)	DF	(Spain)	Aïcha Cámara	17+10	1	4+1	0	0+2	0	1	0	3+5	0	43	1	1	0	
32 (Note: Wore #5 in pre-season)	DF	(Spain)	María Llorella	1+2	0	0	0	0	0	0+1	0	0	0	4	0	0	0	
40	DF	(Spain)	Adriana Ranera	5+3	0	0	0	0	0	0	0	0	0	8	0	0	0	
Midfielders
11	MF	(Spain)	Alexia Putellas	16+9	9	4+1	3	2	1	0	0	11	7	43	20	4	0	
12	MF	(Spain)	Patricia Guijarro	10+7	3	4	0	1+1	0	0	0	7	0	30	3	1	0	
14	MF	(Spain)	Aitana Bonmatí	10+5	7	0+1	0	0	0	0	0	4+2	0	22	7	0	0	
16 (Note: Wore #14 and #21 in pre-season. Started with #34 before her transfer to the first team.)	MF	(Spain)	Clara Serrajordi	19+7	1	1+3	1	1+1	0	1	0	4+6	0	43	2	6	0	
18	MF	(Portugal)	Kika Nazareth	13+13	10	1+3	2	1	0	1	0	1+8	1	41	13	1	1	
19	MF	(Spain)	Vicky López	17+11	10	5	0	2	0	0	0	7+3	2	45	12	1	0	
24	MF	(Netherlands)	Esmee Brugts	17+5	6	3+2	1	2	1	0+1	0	11	4	41	12	4	0	
28	MF	(Spain)	Alba Caño	0	0	1	0	0	0	0+1	0	0	0	2	0	0	0	
39 (Note: Wore #11 in pre-season)	MF	(Spain)	Ainoa Gómez	0+2	1	0	0	0	0	1	0	0+1	0	4	1	0	0	
31 (Note: Wore #15 in pre-season)	MF	(Spain)	Rosalía Domínguez	1	0	0	0	0	0	0+1	0	0	0	2	0	0	0	
Forwards
6	FW	(Switzerland)	Sydney Schertenleib	21+7	8	2+2	1	0+2	0	1	0	0+8	0	43	9	1	0	
7	FW	(Spain)	Salma Paralluelo	13+8	6	2+2	2	0+2	0	0	0	4+3	4	34	12	0	0	
9	FW	(Spain)	Clàudia Pina	17+10	21	4+1	1	2	0	0	0	7+4	2	45	24	2	0	
10	FW	(Norway)	Caroline Graham Hansen	15+6	10	2+1	1	1+1	0	1	0	9+2	4	38	15	1	0	
17	FW	(Poland)	Ewa Pajor	18+5	16	5	3	2	1	1	1	9+1	11	41	32	0	0	
27 (Note: Wore #20 in pre-season)	FW	(Spain)	Celia Segura	0	0	0	0	0	0	0+1	0	0	0	1	0	0	0	
35	FW	(Norway)	Martine Fenger	3+8	3	0+1	0	0	0	0	0	0+1	0	13	3	0	0	
42 (Note: Wore #9 in pre-season)	FW	(Spain)	Natalia Escot	0	0	0	0	0	0	0+1	0	0	0	1	0	0	0	
38 (Note: Wore #7 in pre-season)	FW	(Spain)	Laia Martret	0+1	0	0	0	0	0	0+1	0	0	0	2	0	0	0	
29 (Note: Wore #22 in pre-season)	FW	(Spain)	Lúa Arufe	0	0	0	0	0	0	0+1	0	0+1	0	2	0	0	0	
43 (Note: Wore #19 in pre-season)	FW	(Spain)	Carla Julià	13+4	6	1	0	0	0	0+1	0	0+2	0	21	6	1	0	
Players who left during the season but made an appearance
23	FW	(Spain)	Lucía Corrales	0	0	0	0	0	0	1	0	0	0	1	0	0	0	
38 (Note: Wore #3 in pre-season)	DF	(Poland)	Emilia Szymczak	0	0	0	0	0	0	0+1	0	0	0	1	0	0	0	
Own goals (0)

=== Goalscorers ===
As of 31 May 2026

Rank	No.	Pos.	Nat.	Player	Liga F	Copa de la Reina	Supercopa de España	Copa Catalunya	Champions League	Total
1	17	FW	(Poland)	Ewa Pajor	16	3	1	1	11	32
2	9	FW	(Spain)	Clàudia Pina	21	1	—	—	2	24
3	11	MF	(Spain)	Alexia Putellas	9	3	1	—	7	20
4	10	FW	(Norway)	Caroline Graham Hansen	10	1	—	—	4	15
5	18	MF	(Portugal)	Kika Nazareth	10	2	—	—	1	13
6	24	MF	(Netherlands)	Esmee Brugts	6	1	1	—	4	12
6	7	FW	(Spain)	Salma Paralluelo	6	2	—	—	4	12
6	19	FW	(Spain)	Vicky López	10	—	—	—	2	12
9	6	FW	(Switzerland)	Sydney Schertenleib	8	1	—	—	—	9
10	14	MF	(Spain)	Aitana Bonmatí	7	—	—	—	—	7
11	43	DF	(Spain)	Carla Julià	6	—	—	—	—	6
12	2	DF	(Spain)	Irene Paredes	1	—	1	—	3	5
13	5	DF	(Spain)	Laia Aleixandri	3	—	—	—	1	4
14	12	MF	(Spain)	Patri Guijarro	3	—	—	—	—	3
14	35	FW	(Norway)	Martine Fenger	3	—	—	—	—	3
14	22	DF	(Spain)	Ona Batlle	2	—	1	—	—	3
17	4	DF	(Spain)	Mapi León	2	—	—	—	—	2
17	8	DF	(Spain)	Marta Torrejón	2	—	—	—	—	2
17	16	MF	(Spain)	Clara Serrajordi	1	1	—	—	—	2
20	39	MF	(Spain)	Ainoa Gómez	1	—	—	—	—	1
20	23	DF	(Spain)	Aïcha Cámara	1	—	—	—	—	1
Own goals (from the opponents)					2	2	—	—	2	6
Totals					130	17	5	1	41	194

=== Hat-tricks ===
Player	Against	Minutes	Score after goals	Result	Date	Competition	Ref
(Spain) Clàudia Pina	(Spain) Alhama	71', 73', 90+9'	6–0, 7–0, 8–0	8–0 (H)	30 August 2025	Liga F	
(Spain) Clàudia Pina	(Spain) Sevilla	39', 74' (pen), 90+6'	0–2, 0–4, 0–5	0-5 (A)	21 September 2025	Liga F	
(Poland) Ewa Pajor^{4}	(Spain) Madrid CFF	9', 21', 38', 58'	1–0, 2–0, 5–0, 9–1	12-1 (H)	10 January 2026	Liga F	
(Norway) Caroline Graham Hansen	(Spain) Madrid CFF	14', 25' (pen), 76'	0–1, 0–2, 0–3	0-4 (A)	31 May 2026	Liga F	

(H) – Home; (A) – Away; (N) – Neutral venue (final)
^{4} – Player scored four goals.

=== Assists ===
As of 31 May 2026

Rank	No.	Pos.	Nat.	Player	Liga F	Copa de la Reina	Supercopa de España	Copa Catalunya	Champions League	Total
1	10	FW	(Norway)	Caroline Graham Hansen	10	1	—	—	4	15
2	11	MF	(Spain)	Alexia Putellas	7	—	—	—	6	13
2	19	FW	(Spain)	Vicky López	9	1	—	—	3	13
4	12	MF	(Spain)	Patri Guijarro	5	3	—	—	2	10
4	18	MF	(Portugal)	Kika Nazareth	9	—	—	—	1	10
6	9	FW	(Spain)	Clàudia Pina	5	—	—	—	3	8
6	7	FW	(Spain)	Salma Paralluelo	5	1	—	—	2	8
6	4	DF	(Spain)	Mapi León	7	—	—	—	1	8
6	17	FW	(Poland)	Ewa Pajor	5	2	—	—	1	8
10	24	MF	(Netherlands)	Esmee Brugts	2	1	—	—	4	7
10	16	MF	(Spain)	Clara Serrajordi	3	2	—	—	2	7
12	23	DF	(Spain)	Aïcha Cámara	6	—	—	—	—	6
12	43	DF	(Spain)	Carla Julià	5	1	—	—	—	6
14	6	FW	(Switzerland)	Sydney Schertenleib	3	1	—	—	—	4
15	14	MF	(Spain)	Aitana Bonmatí	3	—	—	—	—	3
15	22	DF	(Spain)	Ona Batlle	2	—	1	—	—	3
17	8	DF	(Spain)	Marta Torrejón	1	—	—	—	—	1
17	38	FW	(Spain)	Laia Martret	1	—	—	—	—	1
17	2	DF	(Spain)	Irene Paredes	—	—	1	—	—	1
Totals					87	13	2		29	131

=== Cleansheets ===
As of 31 May 2026

Rank	No.	Nat.	Player	Liga F	Copa de la Reina	Supercopa de España	Copa Catalunya	Champions League	Total
1	13	(Spain)	Cata Coll	11	1	1	—	5	18
2	1	(Spain)	Gemma Font	9	1	—	1	—	11
3	37	(Spain)	Txell Font	1	—	—	—	—	1
Totals				21	2	1	1	5	30

=== Disciplinary record ===
As of 31 May 2026

No.	Pos.	Nat.	Player	Liga F			Copa de la Reina			Supercopa de España			Copa Catalunya			Champions League			Total		
No.	Pos.	Nat.	Player	Booked	(yellow card) (yellow-red card)	Sent off (straight red)	Booked	(yellow card) (yellow-red card)	Sent off (straight red)	Booked	(yellow card) (yellow-red card)	Sent off (straight red)	Booked	(yellow card) (yellow-red card)	Sent off (straight red)	Booked	(yellow card) (yellow-red card)	Sent off (straight red)	Booked	(yellow card) (yellow-red card)	Sent off (straight red)
Fitness coach		(Spain)	Víctor Zamora			1															1
Coach		(Spain)	Pere Romeu	1			1									1			3		
Goalkeeper coach		(Spain)	Oriol Casares	1															1		
18	MF	(Portugal)	Kika Nazareth	1								1							1		1
16	MF	(Spain)	Clara Serrajordi	3			2									1			6		
11	MF	(Spain)	Alexia Putellas	2												2			4		
24	MF	(Netherlands)	Esmee Brugts	3			1												4		
2	DF	(Spain)	Irene Paredes	3															3		
13	GK	(Spain)	Cata Coll	1												1			2		
4	DF	(Spain)	Mapi León	2															2		
9	FW	(Spain)	Clàudia Pina	1			1												2		
5	DF	(Spain)	Laia Aleixandri													1			1		
12	MF	(Spain)	Patri Guijarro													1			1		
19	FW	(Spain)	Vicky López													1			1		
10	FW	(Norway)	Caroline Graham Hansen	1															1		
6	FW	(Switzerland)	Sydney Schertenleib	1															1		
43	DF	(Spain)	Carla Julià	1															1		
8	DF	(Spain)	Marta Torrejón	1															1		
23	DF	(Spain)	Aïcha Cámara										1						1		
Totals				22		1	5					1	1			8			36		2

Source: FCBarcelona.com
Ordered by (red card) , (second yellow card) and (yellow card)
(yellow card) = Number of bookings; (second yellow card) = Number of sending offs after a second yellow card; (red card) = Number of sending offs by a direct red card.

=== Injury record ===
No.	Pos.	Nat.	Name	Type	Status	Source	Match	Inj. Date	Ret. Date
10	FW	(Norway)	Caroline Graham Hansen	Ligament injury — right foot		FCB Twitter	in training	5 September 2025	20 September 2025
16	MF	(Spain)	Clara Serrajordi	Anterior talofibular ligament injury — left ankle		FCB Twitter	in training	5 September 2025	20 September 2025
9	FW	(Spain)	Clàudia Pina	Adductor discomfort — right thigh		FCB Twitter	in training	3 October 2025	7 October 2025
17	FW	(Poland)	Ewa Pajor	Posterolateral injury — right knee		FCB Twitter	vs Atlético Madrid	12 October 2025	9 November 2025
12	MF	(Spain)	Patri Guijarro	Navicular bone fracture — right foot		FCB Twitter	in training	16 October 2025	18 January 2026
7	FW	(Spain)	Salma Paralluelo	Medial collateral ligament partial rupture — left knee		FCB X	vs Sweden with Spain	24 October 2025	14 January 2026
18	MF	(Portugal)	Kika Nazareth	Sprain — right ankle		FCB X	in training	1 November 2025	9 November 2025
24	MF	(Netherlands)	Esmee Brugts	Tendinopathy — right knee		FCB X	vs Chelsea	20 November 2025	6 December 2025
18	MF	(Portugal)	Kika Nazareth	Anterior talofibular ligament sprain — left ankle		FCB X	vs Netherlands with Portugal	28 November 2025	13 December 2025
14	MF	(Spain)	Aitana Bonmatí	Left ankle fracture		FCB X	in training with Spain	30 November 2025	3 May 2026
22	DF	(Spain)	Ona Batlle	Discomfort — right leg		FCB X	vs Germany with Spain	2 December 2025	10 January 2026
13	GK	(Spain)	Cata Coll	Medial collateral ligament sprain — left knee		FCB X	in training	20 December 2025	10 January 2026
4	DF	(Spain)	Mapi León	Contusion — left ankle		FCB X	in training	20 December 2025	10 January 2026
5	DF	(Spain)	Laia Aleixandri	Muscle sole injury — left foot		FCB X	in training	9 January 2026	1 February 2026
10	FW	(Norway)	Caroline Graham Hansen	Discomfort — left leg		FCB X	in training	9 January 2026	18 January 2026
4	DF	(Spain)	Mapi León	Sprain — right ankle		FCB X	in training	30 January 2026	25 March 2026
5	DF	(Spain)	Laia Aleixandri	Anterior cruciate ligament rupture — right knee		FCB X	vs Real Madrid	5 February 2026	
11	MF	(Spain)	Alexia Putellas	Quadriceps contusion — left leg		FCB X	vs Real Madrid	5 February 2026	14 February 2026
13	GK	(Spain)	Cata Coll	Medial collateral ligament injury — left knee		FCB X	in training	12 February 2025	18 March 2026
12	MF	(Spain)	Patri Guijarro	Anterior talofibular ligament sprain — right ankle		FCB X	vs England with Spain	14 April 2026	22 April 2026
10	FW	(Norway)	Caroline Graham Hansen	Adductor injury — right thigh		FCB X	vs Bayern Munich	3 May 2026	21 May 2026
23	DF	(Spain)	Aïcha Cámara	Injury — right leg		Ara.cat	vs Levante	6 May 2026	9 May 2026

- Player is injured
- Player has recovered from injury
Last updated: 9 May 2026
Source: FC Barcelona

== Awards ==
Name	Position	Award	Ref.
(Spain) Clàudia Pina	Forward	Premi Barça Jugadors 2024–25	
(Spain) Aitana Bonmatí	Midfielder	UEFA Women's Euro 2025 Player of the Tournament	
(Spain) Ona Batlle	Defender	GOAL World Class Club 2025	
(Spain) Mapi León	Defender	GOAL World Class Club 2025	
(Spain) Aitana Bonmatí	Midfielder	GOAL World Class Club 2025	
(Spain) Patricia Guijarro	Midfielder	GOAL World Class Club 2025	
(Spain) Alexia Putellas	Midfielder	GOAL World Class Club 2025	
(England) Keira Walsh	Midfielder	GOAL World Class Club 2025	
(Norway) Caroline Graham Hansen	Forward	GOAL World Class Club 2025	
(Poland) Ewa Pajor	Forward	GOAL World Class Club 2025	
(Spain) Vicky López	Midfielder	Kopa Trophy (2025)	
(Poland) Ewa Pajor	Forward	Gerd Müller Trophy (2025)	
(Spain) Aitana Bonmatí	Midfielder	Ballon d'Or (2025) (3rd award - record)	
(Spain) Ona Batlle	Defender	FIFPRO World 11 – Women's World XI 2025	
(Spain) Aitana Bonmatí	Midfielder	FIFPRO World 11 – Women's World XI 2025	
(Spain) Alexia Putellas	Midfielder	FIFPRO World 11 – Women's World XI 2025	
(Spain) Clàudia Pina	Forward	Liga F Player of the month – November	
(Spain) Aitana Bonmatí	Midfielder	Catalan Football Stars Gala – Best Women's Player (2025)	
(Spain) Alexia Putellas	Midfielder	Catalan Football Stars Gala – Women's Top Goalscorer (2025)	
(Spain) Clara Serrajordi	Midfielder	Catalan Football Stars Gala – Most Promising Women's Player (2025)	
(Spain) Aitana Bonmatí	Midfielder	IFFHS Women's World Best Player (2025) (3rd award - record)	
(Spain) Vicky López	Midfielder	IFFHS Women's World Best Youth (U20) Player (2025) (2nd award - record)	
(Spain) Aitana Bonmatí	Midfielder	The Best FIFA Women's Player (2025) (3rd award - record)	
(Spain) Irene Paredes	Defender	2025 The Best FIFA Women's World 11	
(Spain) Ona Batlle	Defender	2025 The Best FIFA Women's World 11	
(Spain) Patricia Guijarro	Midfielder	2025 The Best FIFA Women's World 11	
(Spain) Aitana Bonmatí	Midfielder	2025 The Best FIFA Women's World 11	
(Spain) Clàudia Pina	Midfielder	2025 The Best FIFA Women's World 11	
(Spain) Alexia Putellas	Forward	2025 The Best FIFA Women's World 11	
(Spain) Aitana Bonmatí	Midfielder	IFFHS Women's World's Best Playmaker 2025 (3rd award - shared record)	
(Spain) Aïcha Cámara	Defender	IFFHS Women's Youth (U20) World Team (2025)	
(Spain) Vicky López	Midfielder	IFFHS Women's Youth (U20) World Team (2025)	
(Spain) Irene Paredes	Defender	IFFHS Women's World Team (2025)	
(Spain) Aitana Bonmatí	Midfielder	IFFHS Women's World Team (2025)	
(Spain) Patricia Guijarro	Midfielder	IFFHS Women's World Team (2025)	
(Spain) Alexia Putellas	Midfielder	IFFHS Women's World Team (2025)	
(Spain) Aitana Bonmatí	Midfielder	Globe Soccer Best Women's Player of the Year (2025) (3rd award - record)	
FC Barcelona		Globe Soccer Best Women's Club of the Year 2025 (4th award - record)	
(Spain) Clàudia Pina	Forward	IFFHS Women's World Best International Goal Scorer 2025	
FC Barcelona		IFFHS Women’s World Best Club 2025 (5th award)	
(Poland) Ewa Pajor	Forward	Liga F Player of the month – December	
(Spain) Irene Paredes	Defender	IFFHS Women's UEFA Team (2025)	
(Spain) Aitana Bonmatí	Midfielder	IFFHS Women's UEFA Team (2025)	
(Spain) Patricia Guijarro	Midfielder	IFFHS Women's UEFA Team (2025)	
(Spain) Alexia Putellas	Midfielder	IFFHS Women's UEFA Team (2025)	
(Spain) Aitana Bonmatí	Midfielder	Mundo Deportivo Gran Gala – Vueling prize for Best Player of Champions League and Eurocopa (2026)	
(Spain) Aïcha Cámara	Defender	IFFHS Women's Youth (U20) UEFA Team 2025	
(Spain) Vicky López	Midfielder	IFFHS Women's Youth (U20) UEFA Team 2025	
(Switzerland) Sydney Schertenleib	Midfielder	IFFHS Women's Youth (U20) UEFA Team 2025	
(Spain) Clàudia Pina	Forward	Liga F Team of the season	
(Spain) Alexia Putellas	Midfielder	Liga F Team of the season	
(Poland) Ewa Pajor	Forward	Liga F Team of the season	
(Spain) Ona Batlle	Defender	Liga F Team of the season	
(Netherlands) Esmee Brugts	Midfielder	Liga F Team of the season	
(Spain) Alexia Putellas	Midfielder	UEFA Women's Champions League Player of the Season (2025–26) (2nd award)	
(Spain) Cata Coll	Goalkeeper	UEFA Women's Champions League Team of the Season (2025–26)	
(Spain) Mapi León	Defender	UEFA Women's Champions League Team of the Season (2025–26)	
(Spain) Patricia Guijarro	Midfielder	UEFA Women's Champions League Team of the Season (2025–26)	
(Spain) Alexia Putellas	Midfielder	UEFA Women's Champions League Team of the Season (2025–26)	
(Poland) Ewa Pajor	Forward	UEFA Women's Champions League Team of the Season (2025–26)	
