= 2024–25 Copa Catalunya Femenina =

Catalan women's football competition

The 2024–25 Copa Catalunya Femenina began in September 2024 and concluded in August 2025, as the eighteenth edition of the Copa Catalunya Femenina. After two years focused on teams playing in the Tercera Federación (fourth national tier) and regional divisions, and being branded as an amateur competition, the 2024–25 competition once again allowed entry for teams that play in the top-tier national leagues. Additionally, it is the first time that the competition was run in both years of the football season it corresponded to, having previously been a summer tournament that took place during pre-season. While still operated as a single-elimination tournament, the bracket style used in 2023 was replaced with a seeded format that introduced new teams in each round except the quarter-finals.

Defending champions SE AEM, who won in 2023 with their B team, were instead able to enter their first team – a parent club may only enter one team – before being knocked out in the semi-finals. Due to the format changes, the competition also saw the return of Europa, Espanyol, Levante Badalona, and ten-time champions Barcelona, for the first time since 2019. Barcelona won the title in the final on 16 August 2025, to extend their record of wins in the competition.

== Teams ==
Team	2023–24 division	2024–25 division	First round	Second round	Third round	Fourth round	Quarter-finals	Semi-finals	Final
FC Barcelona (1)	Liga F							W	Champions
FC Levante Badalona (2)	Liga F							W	Runners-up
RCD Espanyol (3)	Primera Federación	Liga F				W	L		
SE AEM (4)	Primera Federación					W	W	L	
CE Europa (5)	Primera Federación	Segunda Federación				W	L		
UE Cornellà (6)	Tercera Federación	Segunda Federación			W	L			
Vic Riuprimer	Tercera Federación				W	W	W	L	
CE Seagull	Tercera Federación				W	L			
CF Igualada	Tercera Federación				W	L			
CD Fontsanta-Fatjo	Tercera Federación				L				
CD Riudoms	Tercera Federación				W	L			
CE Sant Gabriel	Tercera Federación				L				
UE Porqueres	Preferente Catalana			W	L				
CF Palautordera	Primera Catalana			W	L				
CD Ribes	Primera Catalana			L					
CFF Terres de Lleida	Segona Catalana	Primera Catalana	W	W	L				
CF Castellterçol	Segona Catalana	Primera Catalana	L						
CF Molins de Rei	Segona Catalana	Primera Catalana	W	L					
CE Premià	Segona Catalana	Primera Catalana	W	L					
CF Barceloneta	Segona Catalana		L						
Gimnàstic Manresa	Segona Catalana		L						

== First round ==
1 September 2024	CF Barceloneta	0–3	CF Molins de Rei	Barcelona
12:00		Report	Alicia 5' (pen.); Vallecillos 32', 44'	Stadium: Parc Catalana; Referee: Victor Ortiz-Villajos Martín

1 September 2024	CE Premià	5–2	CF Castellterçol	Premià de Mar
18:00	Xarrié 16', 44', 50'; Perez 88'; Fernandez 89'	Report	Nuevo 7'; Bacter 48'	Stadium: Municipal Premià de Mar; Referee: David Romero Sanchez

1 September 2024	Gimnàstic Manresa	0–5	CFF Terres de Lleida	Manresa
19:30		Report	Bea 20', 34'; Español (yellow card) 32'; Gema 47'; Puig-Gros 50'; Rodriguez 89'	Stadium: Club Gimnàstic Parc; Referee: Mohamed Akhazzan

== Second round ==
7 September 2024	CE Premià	0–5	UE Porqueres	Premià de Mar
19:30		Report	Arboix 14'; Mesa 35', 67'; Gallegos 47', 77'	Stadium: Municipal Premià de Mar; Referee: Yeray Ballesteros Rios

8 September 2024	CF Molins de Rei	3–4	CF Palautordera	Molins de Rei
18:00	Vallecillos 7', 34'; Albanell 87'	Report	Subirana 14', 57'; Chamizo (yellow card) 36'; Ruiz 63'; Clos 89'	Stadium: Municipal Josep Raich; Referee: Sonia Manzano Medina

8 September 2024	CFF Terres de Lleida	8–1	CD Ribes	Rosselló
18:30	Gema 5', 34'; Teixidó 19', 52'; Puig-Gros 61', 68'; Sabate 75'; Sangoy 80'	Report	Rodriguez 59'	Stadium: Municipal Rosselló; Referee: Sergi Cuadrat Oliver

== Third round ==
18 September 2024	CD Riudoms	1–1 (3–1 p)	CD Fontsanta-Fatjo	Riudoms
20:10	Zaragoza 75'	Report	Lloret 16'; Brogden (yellow card) 92'	Stadium: Municipal Baix Camp; Referee: Jaime Fernandez Lopez
	Penalties
	Zaragoza (penalty scored); Martínez (penalty scored); Descarrega (penalty scored)

18 September 2024	CFF Terres de Lleida	1–3	CF Igualada	Cervera
20:30	Aída López 43'	Report	Serra 11'; Bohigas 23'; Tomàs (yellow card) 62'; Salanova 67'	Stadium: Municipal Cervera; Referee: Blanca Sabate Charles

18 September 2024	CF Palautordera	1–2	CE Seagull	Santa Maria de Palautordera
20:30	Fernandez 33'; Cerrato (yellow card) 89'	Report	Jené 2'; Rosales 15'	Stadium: Municipal Font Martina; Referee: Jesus Martinez Curiel

18 September 2024	UE Porqueres	1–2	Vic Riuprimer	Mata
	Clupes 31'	Report	Gil 47'; Alba Lopez 71'	Stadium: Municipal de Miànigues; Referee: Gerard Gomez Gonzalez

18 September 2024	CE Sant Gabriel	0–4	UE Cornellà	Sant Adrià de Besòs
		Report	Romero 61'; Mas 76', 87'; Ramos 82'	Stadium: Estadio Municipal José Luis Ruiz Casado; Referee: Enric Montero Casado

== Fourth round ==
In the fourth round, teams that played in the Primera Federación (second national tier) in the 2023–24 season – Europa, SE AEM, and Espanyol – entered the draw alongside the winners of the third round.

16 October 2024	CD Riudoms	1–5	SE AEM	Riudoms
20:00	Boronat 24'; Zaragoza (yellow card) 33'	Report	Marti 1'; Gestera 34'; Frances 47'; Villarreal 63'; Perez 86'	Stadium: Municipal Baix Camp; Referee: Gonzalo Romero Freixas

16 October 2024	CE Seagull	0–2	RCD Espanyol	Badalona
20:30		Report	Vallejo 67'; Estrella 93'; Mbadi (yellow card) 94'	Stadium: Municipal Badalona; Referee: Raul Rivera Lopez

16 October 2024	CF Igualada	2–2 (4–5 p)	CE Europa	Igualada
21:00	Fàbregues 52'; Jana 81'	Report	Clara (yellow card) 37'; Sílvia 66'; Ander 89'	Stadium: Camp de Futbol CEM Les Comes; Referee: Heaven Nuñez Ruiz
	Penalties
	Penalty missed Penalty scored		Penalty scored

16 October 2024	Vic Riuprimer	3–0	UE Cornellà	Vic
21:15	Ortiz 35', 56'; Grau (yellow card) 75'; L. López 94'	Report		Stadium: ZEM Hipòlit Planàs; Referee: Carla Recasens Cabayol

== Final stages ==
=== Quarter-finals ===
Espanyol – the only team competing in the Liga F (highest tier) in the 2024–25 season to already be participating – was knocked out of the competition in the quarter-finals by AEM, the same team that had knocked them out of the 2024–25 Copa de la Reina in October, and again by a goal from the former Espanyol player María Lara.

13 November 2024	Vic Riuprimer	0–0 (6–5 p)	CE Europa	Vic
20:00		Report	Fernandez (yellow card) 60'	Stadium: ZEM Hipòlit Planàs; Referee: Martina Cardenas Lopez
	Penalties
	Penalty scored		Penalty scored Penalty missed

27 November 2024	SE AEM	1–0	RCD Espanyol	Lleida
19:00	Lara 36'	Report	Guerra (yellow card) 58'	Stadium: Municipal de Recasens; Referee: Mar Torrents Beltran

=== Semi-finals ===
Teams that played in the Liga F in the 2023–24 season – Barcelona and Levante Badalona – entered directly into the semi-finals, to play against the two quarter-final winners.

5 February 2025 Semifinal	SE AEM	0–6	Barcelona	Lleida
19:00 CET (UTC+1)		Report	Pajor 25'; Schertenleib 37'; Fernández 48'; Pina 56', 69'; Brugts 86'	Stadium: Camp d'Esports; Attendance: 10,473; Referee: Sandra González Jiménez

19 February 2025 Semifinal	Vic Riuprimer	0–3	Levante Badalona	Vic
20:00 CET (UTC+1)		Report	Uribe 37'; Julve 57'; Sánchez 90'	Stadium: ZEM Hipòlit Planàs; Referee: Cristina Tortella Jaume

=== Final ===
In April 2025, Jaume Plaza of the Catalan Football Federation (FCF) suggested that the final could be played at the Nova Creu Alta in Sabadell, but did not give definitive plans. The final was significantly delayed, due to the FCF struggling to secure a stadium; Barcelona announced in July that it would be played on 16 August 2025, during pre-season of the 2025–26 season.

16 August 2025
21:00 CET (UTC+1)
Final

Barcelona	1–0	Levante Badalona
Camara (yellow card) 44'; Pajor 54'		González (yellow card) 4'

Camp Municipal de Perelada, Perelada
Attendance: 1,110
Referee: Irene López Brustenga

Barcelona	Badalona

GK	1	Gemma Font
RB	2	Aïcha Camara	(yellow card) 44'	(substituted off) 63'
CB	8	Marta Torrejón (c)		(substituted off) 77'
CB	4	Mapi León		(substituted off) 46'
LB	23	Lucía Corrales		(substituted off) 46'
CM	6	Sydney Schertenleib		(substituted off) 46'
CM	14	Clara Serrajordi		(substituted off) 77'
CM	18	Kika Nazareth		(substituted off) 46'
RF	10	Caroline Graham Hansen		(substituted off) 68'
CF	17	Ewa Pajor		(substituted off) 68'
LF	11	Ainoa Gómez		(substituted off) 46'
Substitutions:
CM	28	Alba Caño		(substituted on) 46'
LB	24	Esmee Brugts		(substituted on) 46'
CF	9	Natalia Escot		(substituted on) 46'
CM	15	Rosalía Domínguez		(substituted on) 46'
CB	3	Emilia Szymczak		(substituted on) 46'
CB	5	María Llorella		(substituted on) 63'
CF	19	Carla Julià		(substituted on) 68'
FW	7	Laia Martret		(substituted on) 68'
FW	22	Lúa Arufa		(substituted on) 77'
FW	20	Celia Segura		(substituted on) 77'
Manager:
Pere Romeu

GK	13	Antonia Canales		(substituted off) 46'
CB	4	Sonia Majarín (c)
LF	7	Irina Uribe		(substituted off) 72'
CF	10	Estefanía Banini		(substituted off) 60'
RF	11	Elena Julve
RB	16	Itziar Pinillos
CM	17	Paula Sánchez		(substituted off) 83'
CM	19	Lorena Navarro
CM	20	Ana González	(yellow card) 4'	(substituted off) 60'
CB	23	Cristina Cubedo		(substituted off) 72'
LB	27	Berta Doltra		(substituted off) 72'
Substitutions:
GK	1	María López		(substituted on) 46'
CM	8	Sarah Jankovska		(substituted on) 60' (substituted off) 72'
FW	14	Loreta Kullashi		(substituted on) 83'
FW	18	Lice Chamorro		(substituted on) 60'
CM	28	Aina Meya		(substituted on) 72'
DF	30	Meri Martorell		(substituted on) 72'
CM	31	Júlia Maillo		(substituted on) 72'
DF	32	Lucía Carmona		(substituted on) 72'
Manager:
Ana Junyent

== Goalscorers ==
4 goals

- Ainhoa Vallecillos

3 goals

- Gema
- Laura Puig-Gros
- Ona Xarrié

2 goals

- Maria Bea
- Aina Gallegos
- Saray Mesa
- Paula Ortiz
- Anna Subirana
- Patrícia Teixidó
- Laura Mas
- Clàudia Pina
- Ewa Pajor
