= 2025 Liga MX Femenil All-Star Game =

Women's football exhibition match in Mexico

- Event: 2025-26 Liga MX Femenil season
Liga MX Femenil All-Stars	FC Barcelona
(Mexico)	(Spain)
2	2
- Barcelona won on penalties 3–4
- Date: August 22, 2025
- Venue: Estadio Universitario, Monterrey, Nuevo Leon
- Referee: Ana Karen Hernandez

The 2025 Liga MX Femenil All-Star Game was a women's football exhibition match in Mexico. It featured an all-star team from Liga MX Femenil facing Liga F club FC Barcelona at Estadio Universitario in Monterrey, Nuevo León on 22 August 2025.

== Background ==
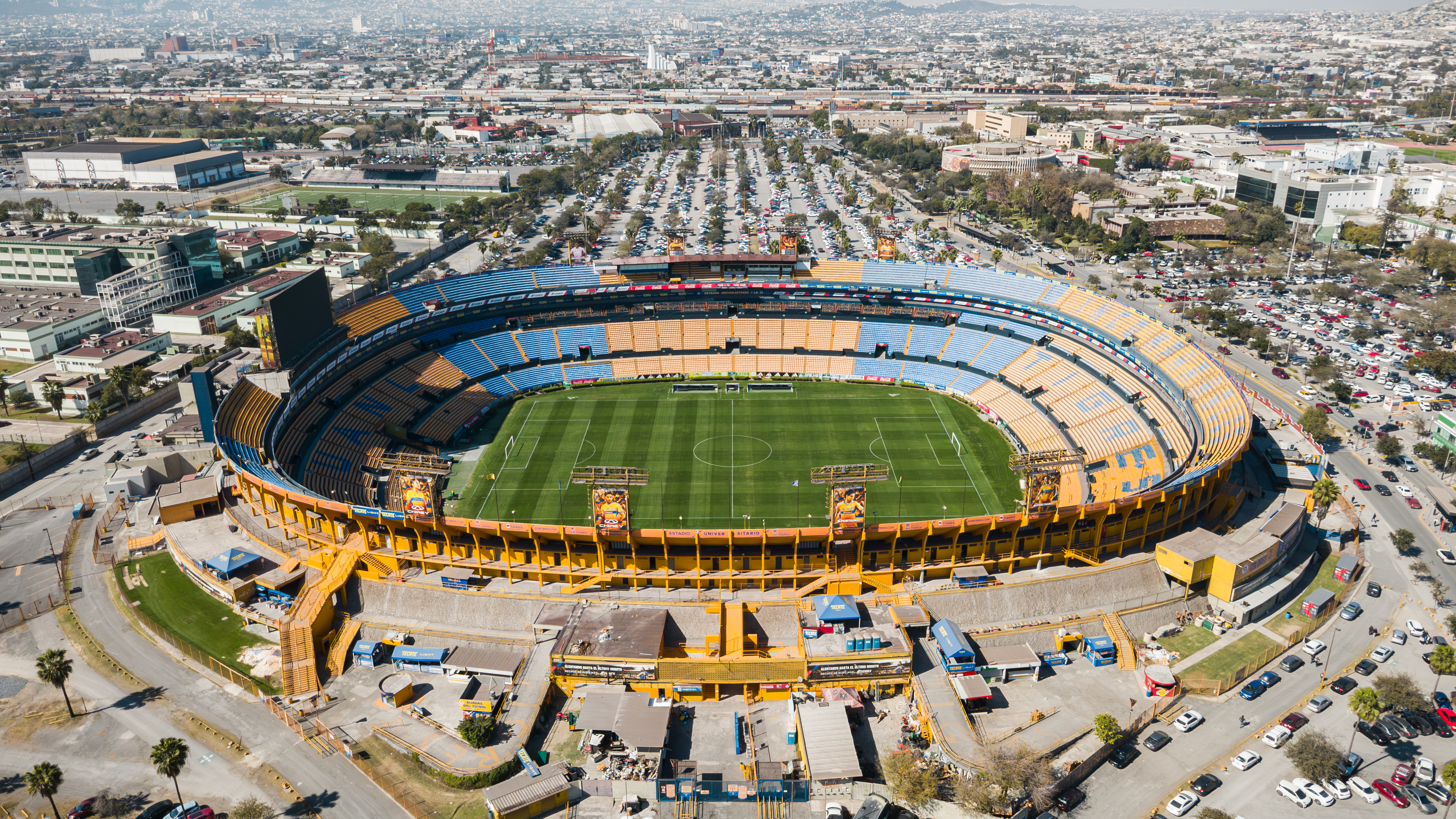
Estadio Universitario was the venue for the All-Star game

On 21 July 2025, Liga MX Femenil and Barcelona announced that as part of Barcelona’s pre-season summer tour in Mexico, the Spanish club would face a Liga MX Femenil All-Stars team composed of 30 players at Estadio Universitario in the city of Monterrey on 22 August 2025. For Barcelona, this was their third visit to the country since their first visit in 2023. According to Liga MX Femenil president, Mariana Gutierrez, this game represented a major milestone in the internationalization of Women's football in Mexico, and that the league worked along with the Mexican Football Federation and commercial partnerts to make the match a reality.

== Squads ==
The Liga MX Femenil All-Stars roster was composed of 30 players that were selected based on performance metrics from the 2024–25 Liga MX Femenil season, with each team in the league providing at least one player to the roster. The four players that were candidates to the 2024–25 best-of-the-season awards were automatically added to the roster. 21 players were selected by the manager of the team, and three other players were selected by fans through an online voting process–the list of players that could be voted was created by the manager in conjunction with the league. Finally, the two remaining players were selected as “surprises” entirely by the league. The first 25 players were announced on 21 July 2025.

Tigres’s Pedro Martínez Losa and his technical team were appointed to coach the team after the top-three choices: Óscar Torres (Pachuca), Amelia Valverde (Monterrey), and Ángel Villacampa (America) declined the offer due to scheduling conflicts, as their respective teams had CONCACAF W Champions Cup games scheduled just a few days prior to the match, and Tigres was the fourth-best ranked team in the general standings of the Liga MX Femenil 2024–25 season.

On 30 July 2025, Liga MX Femenil announced that Anika Rodríguez, Diana García, and Scarlett Camberos were joining the roster after winning most of the fan votes. The league later revealed that Jenni Hermoso and Alicia Cervantes would complete the roster, with both been selected by the league as “distinguished” players.

2025 Liga MX Femenil All-Stars roster
Pos.	Nat.	Player	Club	Selection Process
GK	(Mexico) MEX	Esthefanny Barreras	Pachuca	2024–25 best goalkeeper award winner
GK	(Mexico) MEX	Blanca Félix	Chivas	2024–25 best goalkeeper award candidate
GK	(Mexico) MEX	Valeria Zárate	Atlético San Luis	Manager
DF	(Spain) ESP	Andrea Pereira	Pachuca	Manager
DF	(Mexico) MEX	Michel Fong	Tijuana	Manager
DF	(Mexico) MEX	Greta Espinoza	Tigres UANL	Manager
DF	(Jamaica) JAM	Deneisha Blackwood	UNAM	Manager
DF	(Tanzania) TAN	Julitha Singano	FC Juárez	Manager
DF	(Mexico) MEX	Anika Rodríguez	Tigres UANL	Fan voting
DF	(Mexico) MEX	Nicolette Hernández	América	Manager
MF	(Mexico) MEX	Alice Soto	Monterrey	Manager
MF	(Mexico) MEX	Karla Nieto	Pachuca	Manager
MF	(Mexico) MEX	Lizbeth Ovalle	Tigres UANL	2024–25 best player award candidate
MF	(France) FRA	Amandine Henry	Toluca	Manager
MF	(Mexico) MEX	Diana García	Monterrey	Fan voting
MF	(Spain) ESP	Irene Guerrero	América	Manager
MF	(Mexico) MEX	Carolina Jaramillo	Chivas	Manager
MF	(Argentina) ARG	Ruth Bravo	León	Manager
MF	(Mexico) MEX	Joselyn Solís	Puebla	Manager
MF	(Ecuador) ECU	Dominica Rodríguez	Santos Laguna	Manager
MF	(El Salvador) SLV	Brenda Cerén	Atlas	Manager
MF	(Mexico) MEX	Scarlett Camberos	América	Fan voting
FW	(Mexico) MEX	Charlyn Corral	Pachuca	2024–25 best player award winner
FW	(Portugal) POR	Stephanie Ribeiro	UNAM	Manager
FW	(United States) USA	Aerial Chavarin	Cruz Azul	Manager
FW	(Mexico) MEX	Victoria Ceceña	Querétaro	Manager
FW	(South Africa) RSA	Sinoxolo Cesane	Mazatlán	Manager
FW	(Spain) ESP	Jenni Hermoso	Tigres UANL	Selected by the league as distinguished players
FW	(Mexico) MEX	Alicia Cervantes	Chivas	Selected by the league as distinguished players

Manager: (Spain) Pedro Martínez Losa

1. Dominica Rodríguez was part of the All-Star team, but could not play due to injury.

== Match ==
2025 Liga MX Femenil All-Star Game
22 August 2025
20:30 UTC-6

Liga MX Femenil All-Stars (Mexico)	2–2	(Spain) Barcelona
Ribeiro 27'; Guerrero 81'	Report	Blackwood 28' (o.g.); Bonmati 57'
Penalties
Cervantes (penalty scored); Jaramillo (penalty missed); Bravo (penalty scored); Diana García (penalty scored); Ceceña (penalty missed)	3-4	Putellas (penalty scored); Pina (penalty scored); Torrejon (penalty scored); Bonmati (penalty scored)

Estadio Universitario, Monterrey, Nuevo Leon
Referee: Ana Karen Hernandez (Mexico)

Line-ups

GK	12	(Mexico) Blanca Félix	(substituted off) 88'
RB	22	(Mexico) Anika Rodríguez	(substituted off) 64'
CB	19	(Spain) Andrea Pereira	(substituted off) 46'
CB	4	(Mexico) Greta Espinoza	(substituted off) 46'
LB	3	(Jamaica) Deneisha Blackwood	(substituted off) 46'
CM	6	(Mexico) Karla Nieto	(substituted off) 46'
CM	28	(France) Amandine Henry	(substituted off) 73'
CM	10	(Spain) Jenni Hermoso	(substituted off) 34'
RF	23	(South Africa) Sinoxolo Cesane	(substituted off) 34'
CF	9	(Mexico) Charlyn Corral	(substituted off) 21'
LF	14	(Mexico) Lizbeth Ovalle (Captain)	(substituted off) 53'
Substitutes:
GK	1	(Mexico) Esthefanny Barreras
GK	21	(Mexico) Valeria Zárate	(substituted on) 88'	(substituted off) 69'
DF	2	(Mexico) Michel Fong	(substituted on) 46'
DF	15	(Tanzania) Julitha Singano	(substituted on) 46'
DF	20	(Mexico) Nicki Hernandez	(substituted on) 64'
MF	5	(Spain) Irene Guerrero	(substituted on) 46'	(substituted off) 88'
MF	8	(Mexico) Carolina Jaramillo	(substituted on) 73'
MF	11	(Mexico) Scarlett Camberos	(substituted on) 34'	(substituted off) 46'
MF	13	(Mexico) Diana García	(substituted on) 73'
MF	18	(Argentina) Ruth Bravo	(substituted on) 46'
MF	25	(Mexico) Joselyn Solís	(substituted on) 88'
MF	26	(El Salvador) Brenda Cerén	(substituted on) 53'	(substituted off) 88'
MF	30	(Mexico) Alice Soto	(substituted on) 34'	(substituted off) 73'
FW	7	(Portugal) Stephanie Ribeiro	(substituted on) 21'	(substituted off) 46'
FW	16	(Mexico) Samantha Calvillo	(substituted on) 88'
FW	24	(Mexico) Alicia Cervantes	(substituted on) 46'
FW	27	(Mexico) Victoria Ceceña	(substituted on) 73'
FW	33	(United States) Aerial Chavarin	(substituted on) 46'	(substituted off) 73'
Manager:
(Spain) Pedro Martinez Losa

GK	13	(Spain) Cata Coll
RB	15	(Spain) Aicha Camara	(substituted off) 46'
CB	2	(Spain) Irene Paredes	(substituted off) 46'
CB	4	(Spain) Mapi León	(substituted off) 46'
LB	24	(Netherlands) Esmee Brugts	(substituted off) 46'
CM	6	(Switzerland) Sydney Schertenleib	(substituted off) 46'
CM	12	(Spain) Patricia Guijarro (Captain)	(substituted off) 46'
CM	21	(Spain) Clara Serrajordi	(substituted off) 46'
RF	10	(Norway) Caroline Graham Hansen	(substituted off) 46'
CF	18	(Portugal) Kika Nazareth	(substituted off) 46'
LF	7	(Spain) Salma Paralluelo	(substituted off) 46'
Substitutes:
GK	1	(Spain) Gemma Font
GK	25	(Spain) Txell Font
DF	5	(Spain) Laia Aleixandri	(substituted on) 46'
DF	8	(Spain) Marta Torrejón	(substituted on) 46'
DF	22	(Spain) Ona Batlle	(substituted on) 46'
MF	11	(Spain) Alexia Putellas	(substituted on) 46'
MF	14	(Spain) Aitana Bonmatí	(substituted on) 46'
MF	19	(Spain) Vicky López	(substituted on) 46'
MF	28	(Spain) Alba Caño	(substituted on) 46'
FW	9	(Spain) Clàudia Pina	(substituted on) 46'
FW	17	(Poland) Ewa Pajor	(substituted on) 46'
FW	20	(Spain) Celia Segura
FW	23	(Spain) Lucía Corrales	(substituted on) 46'
Manager:
(Spain) Pere Romeu

Match rules

- 90 minutes
- Penalty shoot-out if scores level after 90 minutes
- Unlimited substitutions
