= 2025–26 Supercopa de España Femenina =

2025–26 Supercopa de España
Spanish Women's Super Cup

Tournament details
- Host country: Spain
- City: Castellón de la Plana
- Dates: 20–24 January 2026
- Teams: 4

Final positions
- Champions: Barcelona (6th title)
- Runners-up: Real Madrid

Tournament statistics
- Matches played: 3
- Goals scored: 10 (3.33 per match)
- Top scorer: 10 players (1 goal)

The 2025–26 Supercopa de España Femenina was the seventh edition of the current Supercopa de España Femenina, an annual women's football competition for clubs in the Spanish football league system that were successful in its major competitions in the preceding season.

== Draw ==
The draw took place in July 2025 ahead of the 2025–26 Liga F season, deciding which of the qualified teams would face each other. The location of the tournament, the Nou Estadi Castàlia in Castellón de la Plana was announced later in December 2025 by the RFEF.

== Qualification ==
The competition featured both finalists (Barcelona, Atlético Madrid) of the 2024–25 Copa de la Reina, as well as the next two highest-ranked clubs in the 2024–25 Liga F that had not already qualified through the cup final: Real Madrid (2nd) and Athletic Club (4th).

It was the first participation of Athletic Club in this competition.

=== Qualified teams ===
The following four teams qualified for the tournament.

Team	Method of qualification
Barcelona	2024–25 Copa de la Reina winner
Atlético Madrid	2024–25 Copa de la Reina runner-up
Real Madrid	2024–25 Liga F runner-up
Athletic Club	2024–25 Liga F fourth place

== Matches ==
=== Bracket ===
Semi-finals
20 January 2026
Real Madrid	3
Atlético Madrid	1
21 January 2026
Barcelona	3
Athletic Club	1

Final
24 January 2026
Barcelona	2
Real Madrid	0

=== Semi-finals ===
20 January 2026
19:15 CET (UTC+1)

Real Madrid	3–1	Atlético Madrid
del Castillo 6'; Weir 15'; Caicedo 19', (yellow card) 57'; Feller (yellow card) 57'; Däbritz (yellow card) 64'	Report	Luany 72'; Medina (yellow card) 85'

Nou Estadi Castàlia, Castellón de la Plana
Attendance: 2,000
Referee: Paola Cebollada López

21 January 2026
19:00 CET (UTC+1)

Barcelona	3–1	Athletic Club
Batlle 34'; Paredes 38'; Nazareth (red card) 45+5'; Pajor 68'	Report	Nevado 24' (pen.)

Nou Estadi Castàlia, Castellón de la Plana
Attendance: 6,000
Referee: Elisabeth Calvo

=== Final ===
24 January 2026
19:00 CET (UTC+1)

Barcelona	2–0	Real Madrid
Brugts 28'; Putellas 90+3' (pen.)	Report

Nou Estadi Castàlia, Castellón de la Plana
Attendance: 12,593
Referee: Eugenia Gil Soriano

Barcelona	Real Madrid

GK	13	(Spain) Cata Coll
DF	22	(Spain) Ona Batlle
DF	2	(Spain) Irene Paredes
DF	4	(Spain) Mapi León
MF	11	(Spain) Alexia Putellas (c)
MF	12	(Spain) Patricia Guijarro
MF	19	(Spain) Vicky López	(substituted off) 72'
MF	24	(Netherlands) Esmee Brugts	(substituted off) 72'
FW	9	(Spain) Clàudia Pina	(substituted off) 84'
FW	10	(Norway) Caroline Graham Hansen	(substituted off) 59'
FW	17	(Poland) Ewa Pajor
Substitutes:
GK	1	(Spain) Gemma Font
GK	37	(Spain) Txell Font
DF	8	(Spain) Marta Torrejón
DF	23	(Spain) Aïcha Cámara	(substituted on) 72'
DF	43	(Spain) Carla Julià
MF	16	(Spain) Clara Serrajordi	(substituted on) 59'
MF	31	(Spain) Rosalía Domínguez
FW	6	(Switzerland) Sydney Schertenleib	(substituted on) 84'
FW	7	(Spain) Salma Paralluelo	(substituted on) 72'
FW	35	(Norway) Martine Fenger
FW	38	(Spain) Laia Martret
Manager:
(Spain) Pere Romeu

GK	1	(Spain) Misa Rodríguez (c)
DF	12	(Brazil) Yasmim	(substituted off) 68'
DF	14	(Spain) María Méndez
DF	23	(France) Maëlle Lakrar	(yellow card) 90+6'
MF	8	(Germany) Sara Däbritz
MF	10	(Scotland) Caroline Weir	(substituted off) 83'
MF	16	(Sweden) Filippa Angeldahl	(substituted off) 68'
FW	7	(Spain) Athenea del Castillo	(substituted off) 83'
FW	18	(Colombia) Linda Caicedo
FW	19	(Spain) Eva Navarro	(yellow card) 90+9'
FW	20	(France) Naomie Feller	(substituted off) 68'
Substitutes:
GK	26	(Spain) Laia López
DF	4	(Spain) Rocío Gálvez
DF	5	(Spain) Paula Comendador	(substituted on) 83'
DF	15	(Denmark) Sara Holmgaard
DF	21	(Spain) Sheila García	(substituted on) 68'
DF	22	(Sweden) Bella Andersson
MF	6	(France) Sandie Toletti	(substituted on) 68'
MF	28	(Spain) Irune Dorado
FW	9	(Denmark) Signe Bruun	(substituted on) 83'
FW	11	(Spain) Alba Redondo
FW	24	(Netherlands) Lotte Keukelaar	(substituted on) 68'
Manager:
(Spain) Pau Quesada

Most valuable player (MVP):
Patricia Guijarro
Assistant referees:
Silvia Fernández Pérez
Rita Cabañero
Fourth official:
Lorena del Mar Trujillano

Match rules

- 90 minutes.
- 30 minutes of extra time if necessary.
- Penalty shoot-out if scores still level.
- Maximum of twelve named substitutes.
- Maximum of five substitutions, with a sixth allowed in extra time. (Note: Each team was given only three opportunities to make substitutions, with a fourth opportunity in extra time, excluding substitutions made at half-time, before the start of extra time and at half-time in extra time.)
- Maximum of one concussion substitution.

== See also ==
- 2025–26 Copa de la Reina
- 2025–26 Liga F
