= Aleksandra Zaremba =

Polish footballer (born 2001)

Personal information
- Date of birth: 19 February 2001 (age 25)
- Place of birth: Warsaw, Poland
- Height: 1.65 m (5 ft 5 in)
- Position: Midfielder

Team information
- Current team: Tenerife
- Number: 11

Youth career
- 2007–2009: Marino
- 2009–2010: Segur de Calafell
- 2010–2011: CD Cubelles
- 2011–2014: Marino
- 2014–2016: CD Echedey

Senior career*
| Years | Team | Apps | (Gls) |
| 2016–2017 | Tacuense B | | |
| 2016–2018 | Tacuense | 26+ | (0+) |
| 2018– | Tenerife | 171 | (6) |

International career^{‡}
| 2024– | Poland | 11 | (0) |
- * Club domestic league appearances and goals as of 10:24, 6 October 2026 (UTC) ‡ National team caps and goals as of 22:31, 13 October 2026 (UTC)

Aleksandra Zaremba (born 19 February 2001) is a Polish professional footballer who plays as a midfielder for Spanish Liga F club Tenerife and the Poland national team. She also holds Spanish citizenship and has represented Spain at youth levels.

== Club career ==
Zaremba has played for Tenerife in Spain.

== International career ==
Born in Poland, Zaremba was raised in Spain, so she was eligible to represent both nations at international level. She played locally in Spain for the Canary Islands at youth levels. She has been called up to the Spain national under-19 team.

On 4 June 2024, Zaremba made her debut for the Poland senior team in a 1–3 UEFA Euro 2025 qualifying loss to Germany. By playing in an official match at the age of 23, she became cap-tied to Poland.

== Personal life ==
Zaremba was granted Spanish citizenship in November 2019. Her full name in that document is Aleksandra Zaremba Kupiec (Note: In this Spanish name, the first or paternal surname is Zaremba and the second or maternal family name is Kupiec.).

== Career statistics ==
=== International ===
As of match played 13 October 2026

Appearances and goals by national team and year
| National team | Year | Apps | Goals |
|---|---|---|---|
| Poland | 2024 | 3 | 0 |
| Poland | 2025 | 4 | 0 |
| Poland | 2026 | 4 | 0 |
| Total | | 11 | 0 |
