= Aïcha Cámara =

Spanish footballer (born 2006)

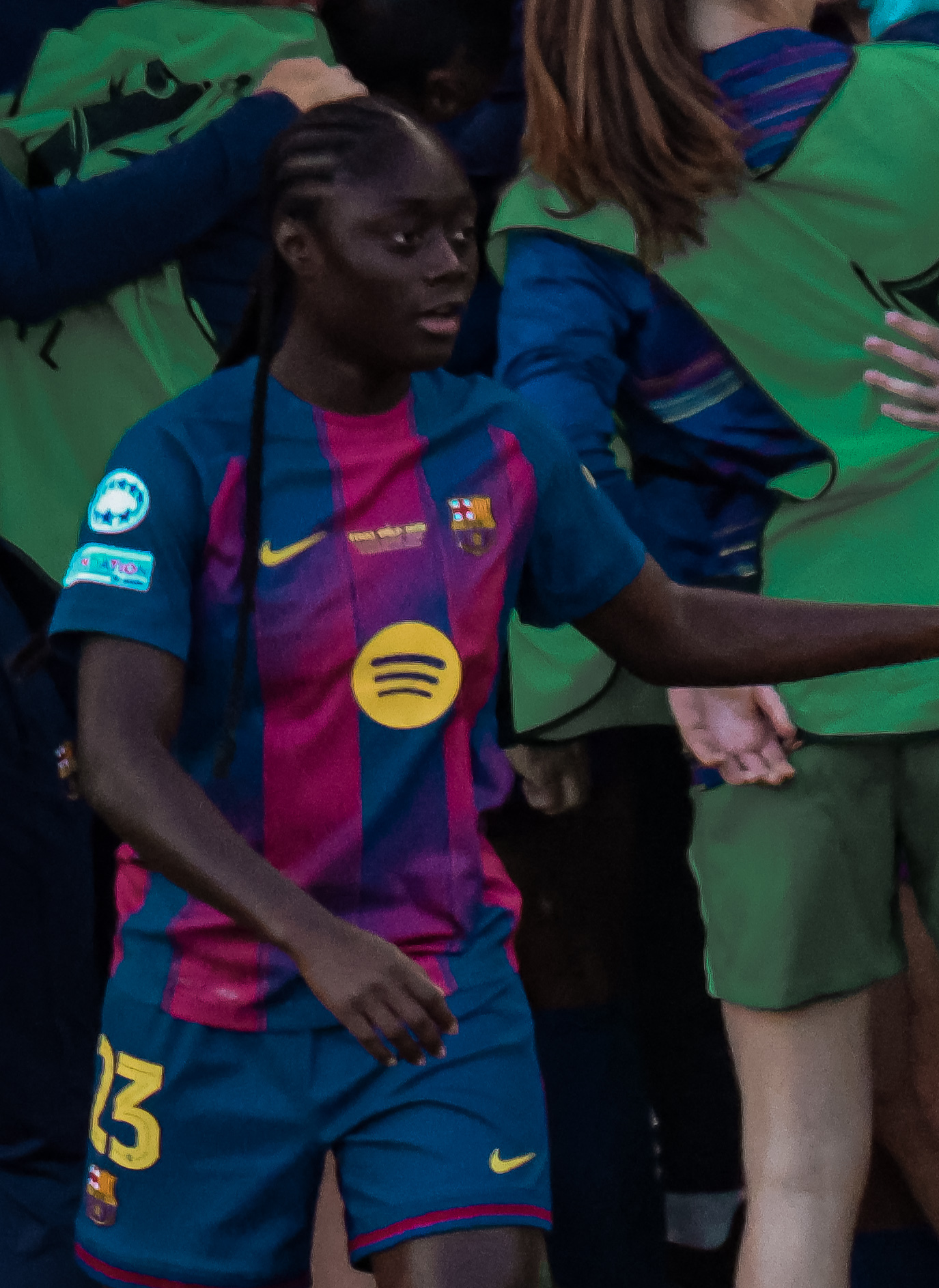

Personal information
- Full name: Aïcha Cámara Cámara
- Date of birth: 11 December 2006 (age 19)
- Place of birth: Sabadell, Spain
- Height: 1.67 m (5 ft 6 in)
- Position: Right-back

Team information
- Current team: Barcelona
- Number: 23

Youth career
- 2022–2023: Barcelona

Senior career*
Years	Team	Apps	(Gls)
2022–2025	Barcelona B	50	(1)
2025–	Barcelona	12	(2)

International career^{‡}
2022–2023	Spain U17	16	(0)
2023–	Spain U19	16	(0)
2024	Spain U20	5	(0)
Medal record
Women's football
Representing Spain
FIFA U-20 Women's World Cup
Winner	2026 Poland
UEFA Women's Under-19 Championship
Winner	2024 Lithuania
Winner	2025 Poland
UEFA Women's Under-17 Championship
Runner-up	2023 Estonia
- * Club domestic league appearances and goals as of 13 December 2025 ‡ National team caps and goals as of 27 June 2025

Aïcha Cámara Cámara (born 11 December 2006) is a Spanish professional footballer who plays as a right-back for Liga F club Barcelona.

== Club career ==
Cámara was born in Sabadell, Catalonia, and played in local youth teams until she was 15; she was scouted by clubs and La Masia, which she joined at the start of the 2022–23 season. She made her first team debut for Barcelona Femení on 7 February 2025, in the 2024–25 Copa Catalunya Femenina that Barcelona would go on to win. After the club lost various players over the summer of 2025, Cámara was officially promoted to the first team as a right back for the 2025–26 season.

== International career ==
Cámara plays often as a central defender for the Spain youth teams. She was selected to the teams of the tournament for the 2023 UEFA Women's Under-17 Championship (in which Spain were runners-up), the 2024 UEFA Women's Under-19 Championship (that Spain won), and the 2025 UEFA Women's Under-19 Championship (that Spain won). In 2024, she competed in both the UEFA U-19 Championship and the 2024 FIFA U-20 Women's World Cup.

== Honours ==
Barcelona

- Liga F: 2025–26
- Copa de la Reina: 2025–26
- Supercopa de España: 2025–26
- UEFA Women's Champions League: 2025–26

Spain U17

- UEFA Women's Under-17 Championship runner-up: 2023

Spain U19

- UEFA Women's Under-19 Championship: 2024, 2025

Spain U20

- FIFA U-20 Women's World Cup: 2026

Individual

- UEFA Women's Under-17 Championship Team of the Tournament: 2023
- UEFA Women's Under-19 Championship Team of the Tournament: 2024, 2025
