= Violeta Quiles =

Spanish footballer (born 1999)

Personal information
- Full name: Violeta García Quiles
- Date of birth: 10 December 1999 (age 26)
- Place of birth: Cartagena, Spain
- Height: 1.65 m (5 ft 5 in)
- Positions: Forward; left-back

Team information
- Current team: UD Tenerife

Youth career
- 2014–2015: FC Cartagena
- 2015–2016: EF Dolerense

Senior career*
| Years | Team | Apps | (Gls) |
| 2016–2022 | Alhama CF | | |
| 2022–2024 | Real Betis | 55 | (4) |
| 2024–2025 | Real Sociedad | 11 | (0) |
| 2026– | UD Tenerife | 0 | (0) |
- * Club domestic league appearances and goals as of 16:55, 2 January 2026 (UTC)

Violeta García Quiles (born 10 December 1999) is a Spanish professional footballer who plays as a forward or left-back for Liga F club UD Tenerife. She has previously played for Alhama CF, Real Betis, and Real Sociedad.

== Youth career ==
Quiles grew up in Cartagena, Spain, where she had her first taste of football at age 15 with FC Cartagena. She then had a one-year stint with EF Dolerense before joining Alhama CF in 2016. Quiles got off to a rocky start at Alhama, struggling to break into the squad and then tearing her ACL right as she began to find her footing. She returned to the field after over a year of rehab and played in 3 matches before the COVID-19 pandemic halted all football.

== Club career ==
=== Alhama CF ===
At the age of 17, Quiles was officially promoted to the Alhama CF first team. She played a key role in the club's 2022 promotion to the Spanish first division, recording 12 goals and 9 assists across the season. One of Quiles' goals was scored against her future affiliate club, Real Betis B. At the end of the season, Primera Federación recognized Quiles as the best player in the league's southern group.

=== Real Betis ===
Although Quiles had the option to play in Alhama CF's return season to the Spanish top division, she chose to enter Liga F by different means. On 6 July 2022, she signed for Liga F club Real Betis on a two-year deal. It would be her first time leaving her hometown of Cartagena. She made her Liga F debut on 17 September 2022, in a match against Levante Badalona. In her first season with the team, Quiles not only had to adapt to a change in setting, but she also managed a transition from operating as a winger to a left-back. From her new position on the backline, she helped Betis escape relegation for two years in a row.

In the 2022–24 season, Quiles had a run of good form in which she scored 3 goals at the tail end of the campaign to ensure Betis' maintained presence in Liga F. Upon the expiry of her contract, she chose to depart from the club. Across 55 matches, she had scored 4 goals and tallied 3 assists with Real Betis.

=== Real Sociedad ===
On 4 July 2024, Quiles signed a two-year contract with Real Sociedad, becoming the first player brought in by new manager José Luis Sánchez Vera. After playing 11 matches in her first campaign with Real Sociedad, Quiles tore her ACL during a training session in February 2025. She subsequently underwent successful knee surgery, but was forced to miss the rest of the season. After completing her recovery, Quiles departed from Real Soceidad on a mutual contract termination in January 2026.

=== UD Tenerife ===
UD Tenerife announced on 3 January 2026, that they had signed Quiles as the club's first new addition of the midseason transfer window.
