= Irina Uribe =

Spanish footballer (born 1998)

Personal information
- Full name: Irina Priscilla Uribe García
- Date of birth: 29 July 1998 (age 28)
- Position: Forward

Team information
- Current team: Levante Badalona

Senior career*
Years	Team	Apps	(Gls)
- Levante Badalona

International career
2024–	Catalonia	2	(0)
- * Club domestic league appearances and goals

Irina Priscilla Uribe García (born 29 July 1998) is a Spanish footballer who plays as a forward for Liga F club Levante Badalona.
