= Itziar Pinillos =

Spanish footballer (born 2000)

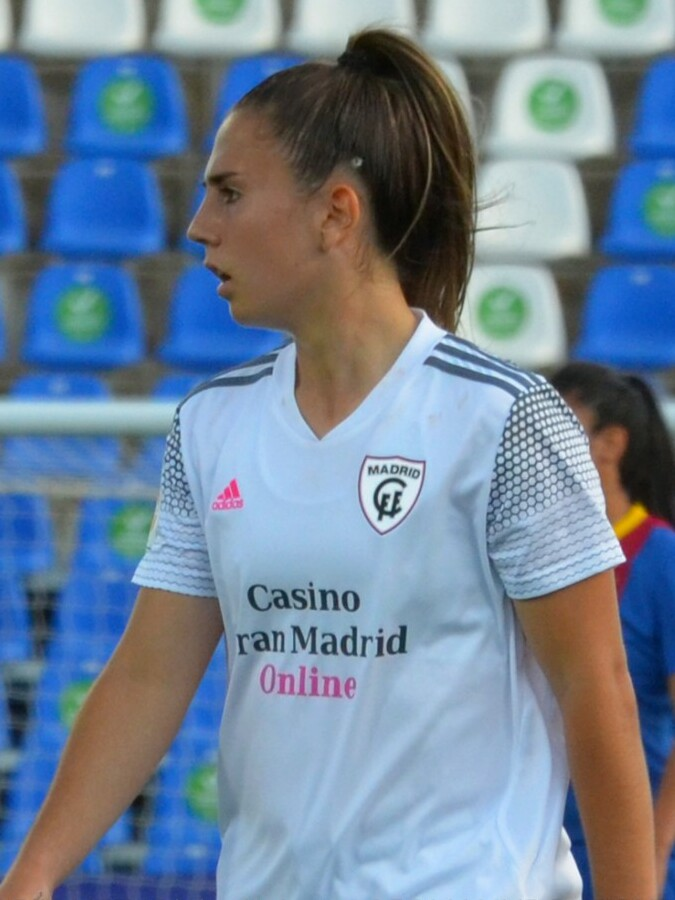

Personal information
- Full name: Itziar Pinillos Moreno
- Date of birth: 21 September 2000 (age 26)
- Place of birth: Madrid, Spain
- Positions: Midfielder; wing back

Team information
- Current team: FC Badalona
- Number: 16

Senior career*
Years	Team	Apps	(Gls)
2016–2019	Atlético Madrid	1	(0)
2019–2024	Madrid CFF	123	(2)
2024–	FC Badalona Women	67	(8)

International career^{‡}
2018–2019	Spain U19	10	(0)
2022–	Spain U23	11	(0)
Medal record
Representing Spain
UEFA Women's Under-19 Championship
First place	2018 Switzerland
- * Club domestic league appearances and goals as of 05:30, 22 December 2023 (UTC) ‡ National team caps and goals as of 05:30, 22 December 2023 (UTC)

Itziar Pinillos Moreno (born 21 September 2000) is a Spanish professional footballer who plays as a midfielder or wing back for Liga F club FC Badalona Women.

== Club career ==
Pinillos started her career at Atlético Madrid.
