= Martine Fenger =

Norwegian footballer (born 2006)

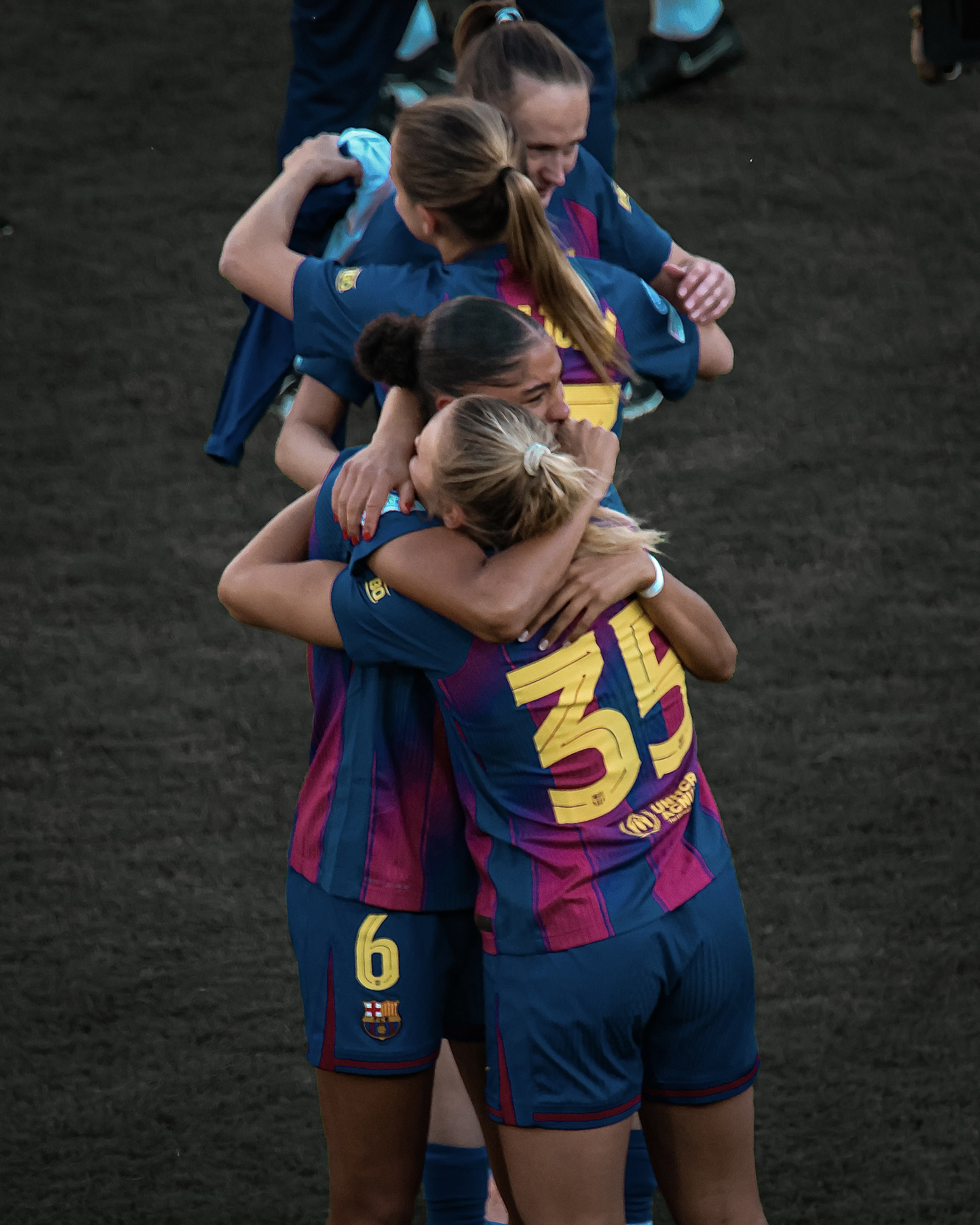
- Fenger (number 35) celebrating with Barcelona teammates in 2026

Personal information
- Full name: Martine Trollsås Fenger
- Date of birth: 9 October 2006 (age 20)
- Place of birth: Norway
- Height: 1.78 m (5 ft 10 in)
- Position: Striker

Team information
- Current team: TSG Hoffenheim
- Number: 15

Youth career
- Gimletroll

Senior career*
Years	Team	Apps	(Gls)
2021	Gimletroll	3	(1)
2021–2022	Amazon Grimstad	15	(1)
2022	Kolbotn 2	2	(1)
2022–2023	Kolbotn	21	(12)
2023–2026	Barcelona B		(13)
2025–2026	Barcelona	9	(3)
2026–	TSG Hoffenheim	9	(0)

International career^{‡}
2021	Norway U15	4	(1)
2022	Norway U16	13	(6)
2023	Norway U17	5	(1)
2023–	Norway U19	10	(2)
- * Club domestic league appearances and goals as of 14 November 2026 ‡ National team caps and goals as of 8 April 2025

Martine Trollsås Fenger (born 9 October 2006) is a Norwegian footballer who plays as a striker for Bundesliga club TSG Hoffenheim.

== Early life ==
Fenger attended WANG School in Norway.

== Club career ==
Fenger played for Norwegian side Kolbotn, where she was regarded as one of the club's most important players.

In 2023, she signed with Barcelona to play in their B team. In 2025, she started training with the first team and made her debut on 2 November, against Real Sociedad. On 6 April 2025, she scored her first goal for the senior team, in a 6–0 win over Badalona.

On 11 June 2026, Fenger signed for Bundesliga side TSG 1899 Hoffenheim on a contract running until 2028.

== International career ==
Fenger has represented Norway internationally at youth level.

== Honours ==
Barcelona

- Liga F: 2025–26
- Copa de la Reina: 2025–26
- UEFA Women's Champions League: 2025–26
