= Elena Julve =

Spanish footballer (born 2000)

Elena Julve Pérez (born 8 December 2000) is a Spanish professional footballer who plays as a winger for Liga F club Badalona.

== Early life ==
A native of Catalonia, Spain, Julve started playing football at the age of 12.

== Career ==
Julve has been described as a "well-known face" in the Queens League.

== Style of play ==
Julve mainly operates as a winger and has been described as "can both play as a winger and behind the striker directing the game. Although when she lands on the side she usually reaches her maximum level, taking advantage of her 1.54 meters to avoid rivals and finish the play, leaving flashes of quality during the course of it. Unstoppable when it comes to carrying out a counterattack".
