= Esmee Brugts =

Dutch footballer (born 2003)

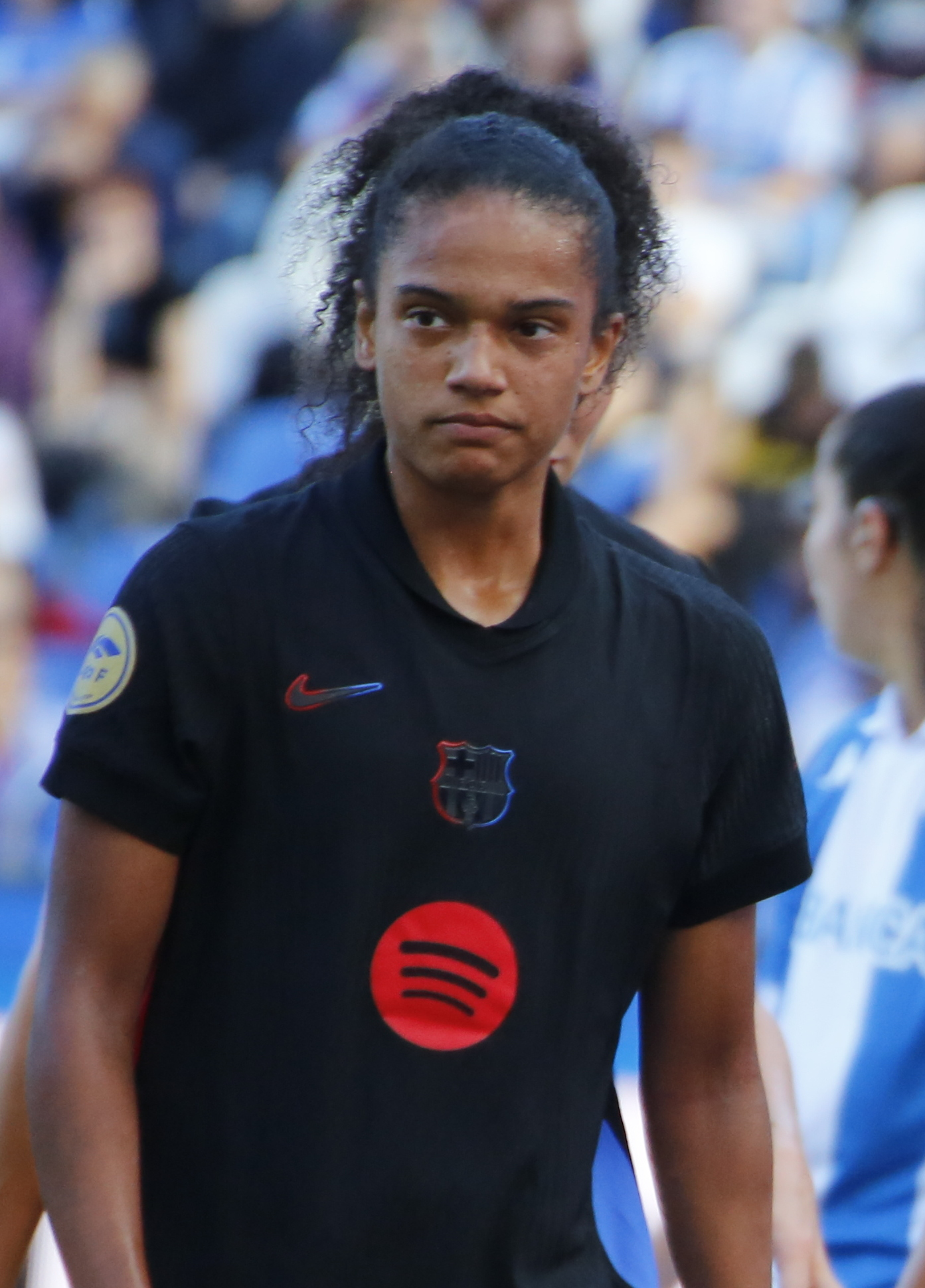
- Brugts with Barcelona in 2024

Personal information
- Full name: Esmee Virginia Brugts
- Date of birth: 28 July 2003 (age 23)
- Place of birth: Heinenoord, Netherlands
- Positions: Midfielder; left-back

Team information
- Current team: Barcelona
- Number: 24

Youth career
- 2008–2016: SV Heinenoord
- 2016–2020: FC Binnenmaas

Senior career*
| Years | Team | Apps | (Gls) |
| 2020–2023 | PSV | 54 | (15) |
| 2023– | Barcelona | 101 | (22) |

International career^{‡}
| 2018 | Netherlands U15 | 3 | (1) |
| 2018 | Netherlands U16 | 4 | (0) |
| 2018–2020 | Netherlands U17 | 19 | (13) |
| 2020 | Netherlands U18 | 3 | (2) |
| 2021 | Netherlands U19 | 2 | (2) |
| 2021 | Netherlands U23 | 3 | (1) |
| 2022– | Netherlands | 28 | (8) |
- * Club domestic league appearances and goals as of 27 March 2026 ‡ National team caps and goals as of 31 October 2023

Esmee Virginia Brugts (born 28 July 2003) is a Dutch professional footballer who plays as a midfielder or left-back for Liga F club Barcelona and the Netherlands national team.

== Club career ==
=== PSV ===
Brugts started playing football with boys as a five-year-old for SV Heinenoord. She moved to FC Binnenmaas eight years later to play there for four years. She was highly sought after when she signed her first contract with PSV at age 16 in 2020. On 13 August 2020, Brugts made her debut for PSV in a pre-season match against Olympique Lyonnais. She scored her first league goal against ADO Den Haag on 8 November 2020, scoring in the 90th+2nd minute. In her first season at PSV she played 13 league games, scoring three goals. In the final of the KNVB Women's Cup she played the whole match, with PSV defeating ADO Den Haag 1–0. In her second season she played in the final of the 2022 KNVB Women's Cup, losing 2–1 to Ajax. Brugts scored a hat-trick against Telstar on 24 March 2023.

=== Barcelona ===
In August 2023, she signed a four-year contract with Barcelona. She scored her first goals for Barcelona with an eight-minute hat-trick against Eibar on 9 December 2023, playing as a number 9 initially and as a left-back later in the match due to a spate of injuries. By the end of the season, she had played as winger and full-back on both sides, as well as up front. Between the multiple positions and Barcelona notoriously taking time to adapt to, Brugts finished the season with fewer goal contributions, though considered good statistics for her debut season.

== International career ==
Brugts was born in the Netherlands to a Surinamese father and Dutch mother. She has played for several Netherlands youth teams. On 16 February 2022, she collected her first senior cap for the Netherlands in a game against Brazil during the 2022 Tournoi de France. She came on the field as a substitute for Victoria Pelova six minutes before the end of the match. She scored her first goal for the national team on 8 April 2022 in a match against Cyprus. On 6 September 2022, she scored a goal in the 93rd minute of the stoppage time in a 1–0 victory over Iceland, to qualify her country as top of Group C to the 2023 FIFA Women's World Cup.

On 31 May 2023, she was named as part of the Netherlands provisional squad for the FIFA Women's World Cup. She played at all five games for the Netherlands during the World Cup, scoring twice against Vietnam in the final group game.

== Personal life ==
She is in a relationship with her compatriot Daniëlle de Jong.

== Career statistics ==
=== Club ===
As of match played 21 December 2024

Appearances and goals by club, season and competition
| Club | Season | League | | | National Cup (Note: Includes KNVB Women's Cup, Copa de la Reina) | | League cup (Note: Includes Eredivisie Cup, Supercopa de España Femenina) | | Continental (Note: Includes UEFA Women's Champions League) | | Total | |
| Club | Season | Division | Apps | Goals | Apps | Goals | Apps | Goals | Apps | Goals | Apps | Goals |
|---|---|---|---|---|---|---|---|---|---|---|---|---|
| PSV Eindhoven | 2020–21 | Eredivisie | 18 | 3 | 3 | 0 | 5 | 2 | 2 | 0 | 28 | 5 |
| PSV Eindhoven | 2021–22 | Eredivisie | 21 | 4 | 4 | 1 | 2 | 0 | 2 | 2 | 29 | 7 |
| PSV Eindhoven | 2022–23 | Eredivisie | 15 | 8 | 4 | 1 | 2 | 1 | — | | 21 | 10 |
| PSV Eindhoven | Total | | 54 | 15 | 11 | 2 | 9 | 3 | 4 | 2 | 78 | 22 |
| Barcelona | 2023–24 | Liga F | 27 | 7 | 4 | 0 | 1 | 0 | 8 | 0 | 40 | 7 |
| Barcelona | 2024–25 | Liga F | 27 | 6 | 4 | 3 | 1 | 0 | 11 | 2 | 45 | 9 |
| Barcelona | Total | | 54 | 11 | 8 | 3 | 2 | 0 | 19 | 2 | 85 | 16 |
| Career total | | | 108 | 26 | 19 | 5 | 11 | 3 | 23 | 4 | 163 | 38 |

=== International ===
As of match played 31 October 2023

Appearances and goals by national team and year
| National team | Year | Apps | Goals |
|---|---|---|---|
| Netherlands | 2022 | 11 | 3 |
| Netherlands | 2023 | 15 | 5 |
| Total | | 26 | 8 |

Scores and results list Netherlands's goal tally first, score column indicates score after each Brugts goal.

List of international goals scored by Esmee Brugts
| No. | Date | Venue | Opponent | Score | Result | Competition | Ref. |
|---|---|---|---|---|---|---|---|
| 1 | 8 April 2022 | Euroborg, Groningen, Netherlands | Cyprus | 12–0 | 12–0 | 2023 FIFA Women's World Cup qualification | |
| 2 | 6 September 2022 | Stadion Galgenwaard, Utrecht, Netherlands | Iceland | 1–0 | 1–0 | 2023 FIFA Women's World Cup qualification | |
| 3 | 11 November 2022 | Stadion Galgenwaard, Utrecht, Netherlands | Costa Rica | 4–0 | 4–0 | Friendly | |
| 4 | 21 February 2023 | National Stadium, Ta' Qali, Ta' Qali, Malta | Austria | 4–0 | 4–0 | Friendly | |
| 5 | 1 August 2023 | Forsyth Barr Stadium, Dunedin, New Zealand | Vietnam | 3–0 | 7–0 | 2023 FIFA Women's World Cup | |
| 6 | 1 August 2023 | Forsyth Barr Stadium, Dunedin, New Zealand | Vietnam | 6–0 | 7–0 | 2023 FIFA Women's World Cup | |
| 7 | 27 October 2023 | Goffertstadion, Nijmegen, Netherlands | Scotland | 2–0 | 4–0 | 2023–24 UEFA Women's Nations League | |
| 8 | 31 October 2023 | Hampden Park, Glasgow, Scotland | Scotland | 1–0 | 1–0 | 2023–24 UEFA Women's Nations League | |
| 9 | 29 October 2024 | Esbjerg Stadium, Esbjerg, Denmark | Denmark | 1–0 | 2–1 | Friendly | |
| 10 | 29 November 2024 | Sparta Stadion Het Kasteel, Rotterdam, Netherlands | China | 4–1 | 4–1 | Friendly | |
| 11 | 5 July 2025 | Stadion Allmend, Lucerne, Switzerland | Wales | 3–0 | 3–0 | UEFA Women's Euro 2025 | |
| 12 | 14 April 2026 | Rat Verlegh Stadion, Breda, Netherlands | France | 2–1 | 2–1 | 2027 FIFA Women's World Cup qualification | |
| 13 | 9 October 2026 | Pancho Aréna, Felcsút, Hungary | Hungary | 4–0 | 8–0 | 2027 FIFA Women's World Cup qualification | |
| 14 | 13 October 2026 | Koning Willem II Stadion, Tilburg, Netherlands | Hungary | 1–0 | 3–0 | 2027 FIFA Women's World Cup qualification | |

== Honours ==
PSV Eindhoven

- KNVB Women's Cup: 2020–21

FC Barcelona

- Liga F: 2023–24, 2024–25, 2025–26
- Copa de la Reina: 2023–24, 2024–25, 2025–26
- Supercopa de España: 2023–24, 2024–25, 2025–26
- UEFA Women's Champions League: 2023–24, 2025–26

Individual

- Eredivisie Talent of the Year: 2022–23
- IFFHS Women's Youth (U20) UEFA Team: 2023
