= Sydney Schertenleib =

Swiss footballer (born 2007)

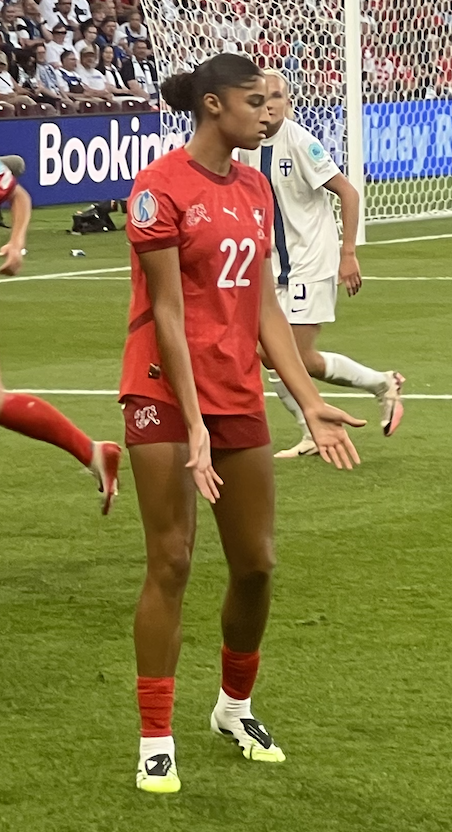
- Schertenleib with Switzerland in 2025

Personal information
- Full name: Sydney Joy Schertenleib
- Date of birth: 30 January 2007 (age 19)
- Place of birth: Zurich, Switzerland
- Height: 1.78 m (5 ft 10 in)
- Position: Midfielder

Team information
- Current team: Barcelona
- Number: 6

Youth career
- 2015–2017: FC Wädenswil
- 2017–2022: FC Zürich

Senior career*
Years	Team	Apps	(Gls)
2022–2023	FC Zürich	8	(2)
2023–2024	Grasshopper Club Zürich	16	(3)
2024–	FC Barcelona	52	(10)

International career^{‡}
2021–2022	Switzerland U15	8	(2)
2022–2023	Switzerland U17	14	(4)
2023	Switzerland U19	8	(8)
2024–	Switzerland	27	(5)
- * Club domestic league appearances and goals as of 16:04, 8 November 2026 (UTC) ‡ National team caps and goals as of 14 October 2026

Sydney Joy Schertenleib (born 30 January 2007) is a Swiss footballer who plays as a midfielder for Liga F club FC Barcelona and the Switzerland national team.

== Career ==
Schertenleib is a prodigy of the FC Zürich youth academy which she joined at the age of 10. She played there with boys teams until the age of 15.

Her breakthrough year was at that age in 2022. In May, she won the Blue Stars/FIFA Youth Cup (an international Under-19 club tournament) with the FC Zürich girls team with a win in the final against Olympique Lyonnais Féminin. In August of the same year, she made her first appearance in the FC Zürich U21 team in Nationalliga B (Swiss 2nd Division) against FC Wil, scoring her first goal right away. In this team, she played together with her older sister Lillian. Sydney scored more than one goal per game for this team in this season and Lillian almost two goals per game in average.

On 1 October of the same year, Sydney made her first appearance in the Swiss Women's Super League for FC Zürich, scoring her first goal in the same game as well. In the same month, FC Zürich coach Inka Grings was denied by a UEFA rule to field Schertenleib in the UEFA Champions League group stage because with year of birth 2007, she was deemed too young. In May 2023, she won the Swiss championship with Zürich after winning in the playoff-final against Servette.

Aged 16, she joined city rival Grasshopper Zurich in the summer of 2023. As Grasshoppers in contrast to title contender FC Zürich was at that moment a mid-table team in the Swiss Women's Super League, she had a higher probability of being fielded in the starting line-up in every game despite her young age. In the 2023–24 season, she reached the playoff quarter-finals with Grasshoppers, where they lost to BSC Young Boys.

After just one season at Grasshoppers, Schertenleib moved to Spain agreeing to an offer of FC Barcelona. She made her first appearance for Barcelona B in Primera Federación (2nd Division) on 7 September at Villarreal. Only one week later, she was already called up for the first team of FC Barcelona in a Liga F game where she was first time fielded on 2 November in a game against Eibar. Soon after, Schertenleib was nominated for the Golden Girl Award of the ten best young talents worldwide.

On 15 November 2025, she scored her first goal in el Clásico, at the Montjuïc Stadium in front of 36,276 people.

In 2025, Schertenleib was ranked third in Goal's NXGN list of the 25 best teenage wonderkids in women's football. The following year in 2026, she was ranked first in Goal’s NXGN list of the 25 best teenage wonderkids in women’s football.

== International career ==
Schertenleib was born in Switzerland to a Swiss father and American mother, and holds dual citizenship. She has represented Switzerland at youth and senior level.

In May 2023, Schertenleib reached the 2023 UEFA Under-17 Championship semi-finals in Estonia with Switzerland under-17s.

In February 2024, one month after turning 17, she made her first appearance for the Switzerland national team in a friendly against Poland. In July of the same year, she scored her first goal for the national team against Turkey.

On 23 June 2025, Schertenleib was called up to the Switzerland squad for the UEFA Euro 2025.

== Career statistics ==
=== International ===
Scores and results list Switzerland's goal tally first, score column indicates score after each Schertenleib goal.

List of international goals scored by Sydney Schertenleib
No.	Date	Venue	Opponent	Score	Result	Competition
1	12 July 2024	Kocaeli Stadium, İzmit, Turkey	Turkey	1–0	2–0	UEFA Women's Euro 2025 qualifying
2	25 February 2025	Viking Stadion, Stavanger, Norway	Norway	1–1	1–2	2025 UEFA Women's Nations League
3	28 October 2025	East End Park, Dunfermline, Scotland	Scotland	1–0	4–3	Friendly
4	28 October 2025	East End Park, Dunfermline, Scotland	Scotland	3–2	4–3	Friendly
5	7 March 2026	Centenary Stadium, Ta' Qali, Malta	Malta	4–1	4–1	2027 FIFA Women's World Cup qualification
6	5 June 2026	Cornaredo Stadium, Lugano, Switzerland	Malta	1–0	6–1	2027 FIFA Women's World Cup qualification
7	9 October 2026	Mezőkövesdi Városi Stadion, Mezőkövesd, Hungary	Israel	3–2	7–3	2027 FIFA Women's World Cup qualification play-offs

== Honours ==
Barcelona

- Liga F: 2024–25, 2025–26
- Copa de la Reina: 2024–25, 2025–26
- Supercopa de España: 2025–26
- UEFA Women's Champions League: 2025–26
