= Carla Julià =

Spanish footballer (born 2006)

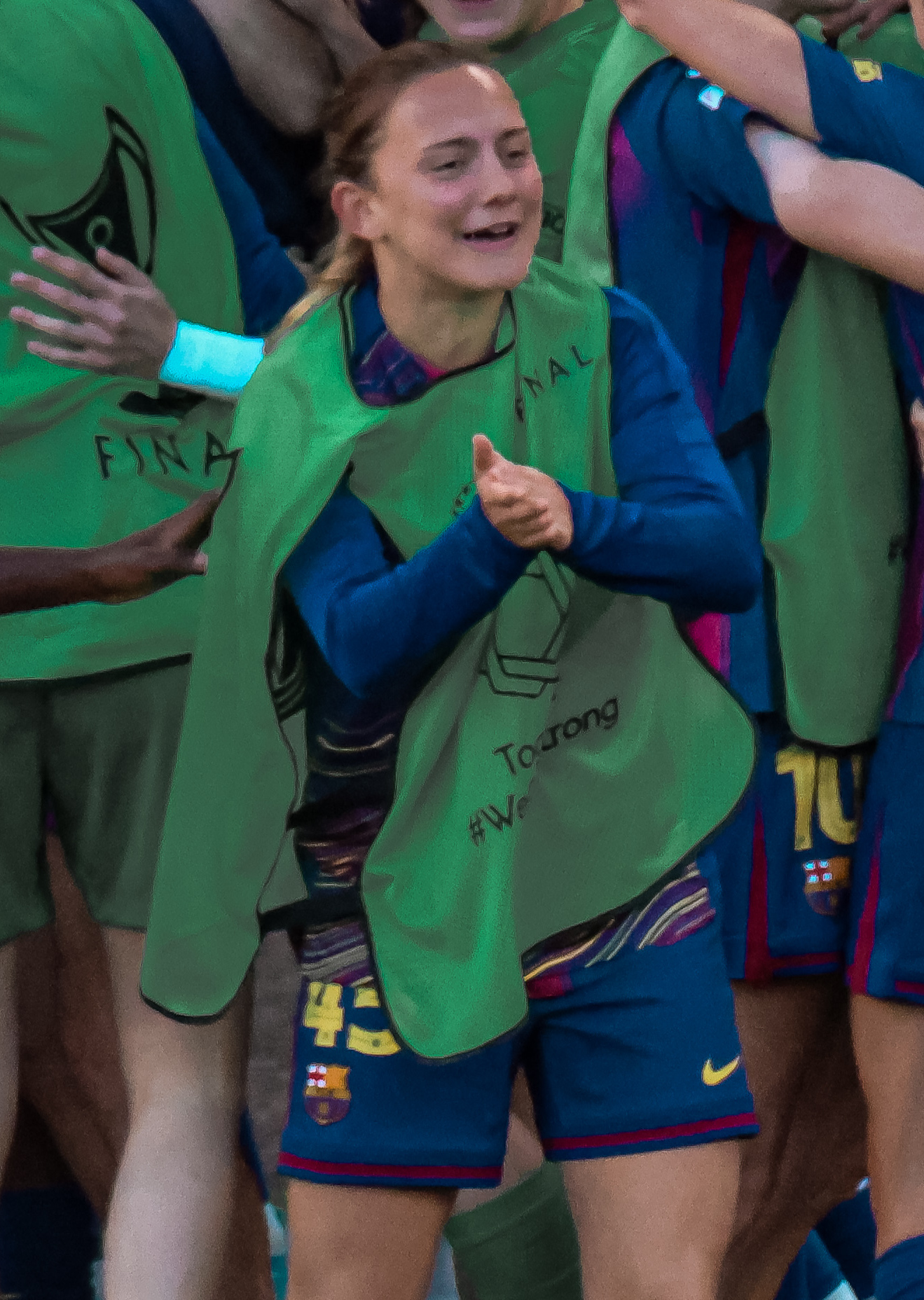
- Julià with Barcelona in 2026

Personal information
- Full name: Carla Julià Martínez
- Date of birth: 14 December 2006 (age 19)
- Place of birth: Barcelona, Catalonia
- Positions: Defender; midfielder; winger

Team information
- Current team: Barcelona
- Number: 21

Youth career
- Espanyol

Senior career*
Years	Team	Apps	(Gls)
2023–2025	Levante Las Planas	4	(0)
2025–	Barcelona B	10	(1)
2025–	Barcelona	16	(6)

International career
- Spain U17
- Spain U19
- Spain U20
Medal record
Women's football
Representing Spain
FIFA U-20 Women's World Cup
Winner	2026 Poland
- * Club domestic league appearances and goals as of 26 May 2026

Carla Julià Martínez (born 14 December 2006) is a Spanish professional footballer who plays as a defender, midfielder, or winger for Liga F club Barcelona.

== Early life ==
Julià was born on 14 December 2006. Born in Spain, she is a native of Barcelona, Spain.

== Club career ==
As a youth player, Julià joined the youth academy of Espanyol. Following her stint there, she signed for Levante Las Planas, where she made four league appearances.

In July 2025, she then signed for Barcelona B on a 2-year contract, often playing for the Barcelona first team, and helping the club win the league title and the 2025–26 UEFA Women's Champions League. In July 2026 she signed a contract extension until 2030 and was promoted to the first team.

== Style of play ==
Julià plays as a defender, midfielder, or winger. Spanish newspaper Diario AS wrote in 2026 that she is a "versatile footballer, who can play as a full-back or winger on either side".

== Honours ==
Barcelona

- Liga F: 2025–26
- Copa de la Reina: 2025–26
- UEFA Women's Champions League: 2025–26

Spain U20

- FIFA U-20 Women's World Cup: 2026
