= Clara Serrajordi =

Spanish footballer (born 2007)

- Serrajordi with Spain in 2026

Personal information
- Full name: Clara Serrajordi Díaz
- Date of birth: 7 December 2007 (age 18)
- Place of birth: Llinars del Vallès, Spain
- Height: 1.70 m (5 ft 7 in)
- Position: Midfielder

Team information
- Current team: FC Barcelona
- Number: 16

Youth career
- 2018–2022: FC Barcelona

Senior career*
| Years | Team | Apps | (Gls) |
| 2022–2024 | FC Barcelona C | 16 | (4) |
| 2024–2025 | FC Barcelona B | | |
| 2025– | FC Barcelona | 24 | (1) |

International career^{‡}
| 2023–2024 | Spain U17 | | |
| 2024–2025 | Spain U19 | | |
| 2025– | Spain | 4 | (0) |
Medal record
Women's football
Representing Spain
UEFA Women's Under-19 Championship
| Winner | 2025 Poland |
FIFA U-17 Women's World Cup
| Runner-up | 2024 Dominican Republic |
UEFA Women's Under-17 Championship
| Winner | 2024 Sweden |
- * Club domestic league appearances and goals as of 20:43, 22 April 2026 (UTC) ‡ National team caps and goals as of 20:43, 22 April 2026 (UTC)

Clara Serrajordi Díaz (born 7 December 2007) is a Spanish professional footballer who plays as a midfielder for the Liga F club Barcelona and the Spain national team.

== Club career ==
Serrajordi made her debut with FC Barcelona B in 2023.

She made her senior Barcelona debut in the 2024–25 season, where she played four games.

== International career ==
Serrajordi was called up by the Spain U17 squad in 2023. She played in 2024 UEFA Women's Under-17 Championship won by the Spain under-17 team.

She was called up to the Spain under-19 team in 2024. She scored a goal in the 2025 UEFA Women's Under-19 Championship final.

== Honours ==
FC Barcelona

- Liga F: 2024–25, 2025–26
- Copa de la Reina de Fútbol: 2024–25, 2025–26
- Supercopa de España Femenina: 2025–26
- UEFA Women's Champions League: 2025–26

Spain U17

- UEFA Women's Under-17 Championship: 2024
- FIFA U-17 Women's World Cup runner-up: 2024

Spain U19

- UEFA Women's Under-19 Championship: 2025

Individual

- UEFA Women's Under-19 Championship Team of the Tournament: 2025
