= Vidal =

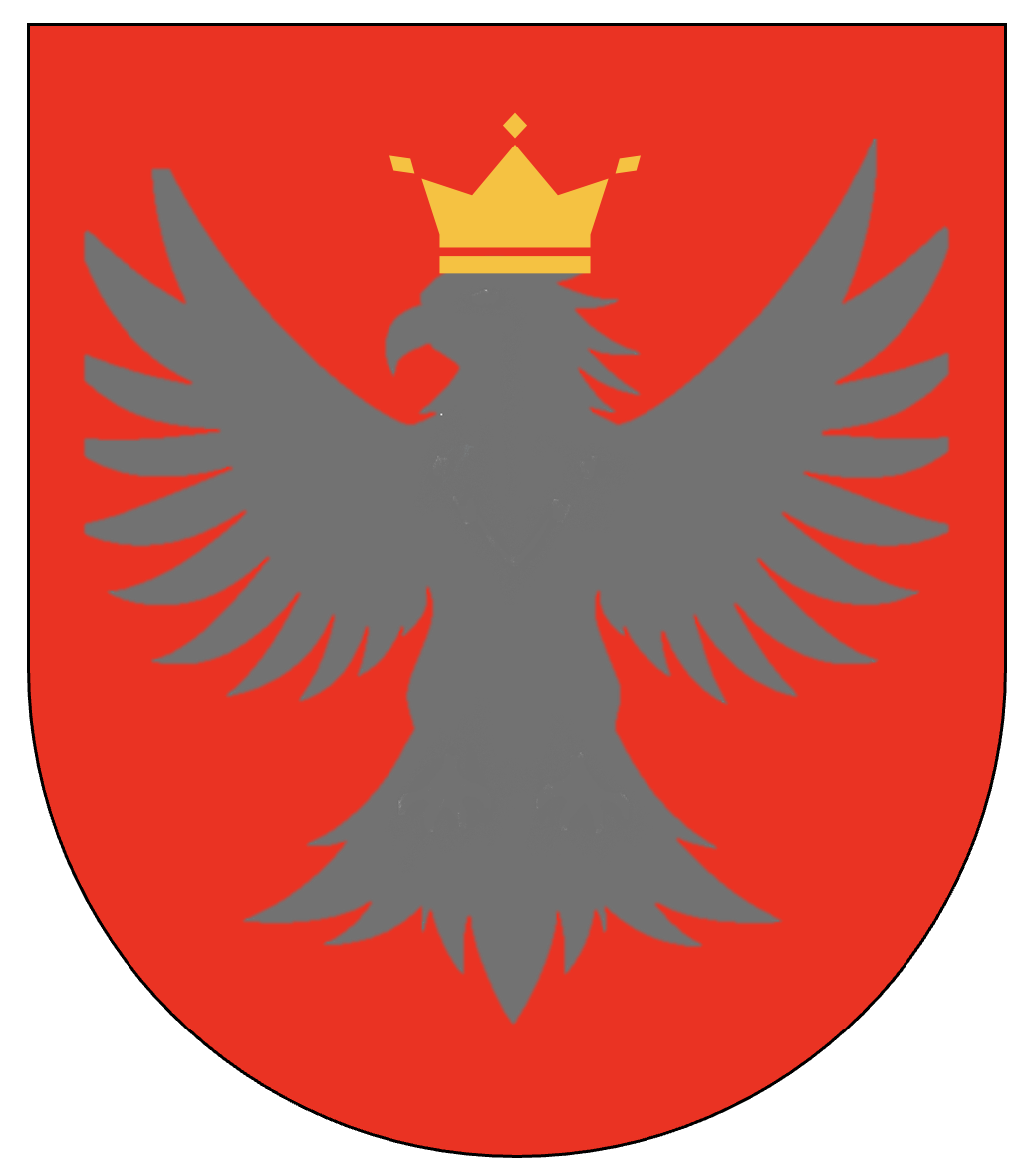
- Gender: Masculine (given name)
- Language: Catalan, Spanish

Other gender
- Feminine: Vidalides (from Latin)

Origin
- Language: Latin
- Origin: Vitalis
- Meaning: life, vitality

Other names
- Cognates: Vital (surname and given name), Vitale, Vitali, Vitalii, Vitalie
- Related names: Vidales, Vivas, Vives, Vidaller, Vidals, Vivar, Vivó, Vitaliano, Viviano, Pidal, Pitalis, Vidale, Vides

Vidal (Aragonese: [biˈðal], Catalan: [biˈðal], Occitan: [biˈðal, viˈdal], Spanish: [biˈðal]) is a name that originated in Spain based on the Latin Vitalis, referring to the trait of vitality. Though first used as a given name, it is most commonly found as a surname, which is incredibly common globally. It is a Catalan surname, originally from the historic Kingdom of Aragon and now common across Spanish-speaking nations. Infrequently seen as a given name, this is still found globally, though it has more popular variants.

As a consistently uncommon given name, it was historically found in religious settings, predominantly Christian but also Sephardi. The surname was considered a name of nobility in Aragon and Catalonia during the Middle Ages, during which Vidal lines had ruled over Valencia and the Balearic Islands. In the 20th and 21st centuries, it is still globally widespread.

== Origins and etymology ==
=== Origin and meaning ===
Vidal originated as a given name and may be given as a baptismal name, a rendering of the Latin name Vītālis (and its origin, vita), meaning "life" and "vitality". This ultimately derived from a proto-Indo-European root that Juan Sebastián Elián, in his dictionary of surnames, referred to as guem and defined as meaning "to come into the world"; Elián wrote that this root meaning was interpreted as a blessing for long life for newborns. This interpretation is also reflected in some of the surname's variants, those coming from vivas, "(to will that) you live", and vivere, the imperative "to live". A genetic analysis of people with the surname, published within a wider Catalan surname and genetics study by Pompeu Fabra University (UPF) in 2015, had 67 usable samples; of these, it found the subjects came from 57 different lines, showing significant genetic diversity and a large number of different lines.

=== Spanish given name etymology ===
The name was recorded in Spain at least as early as the 3rd century AD, when Saint Vidal of Complutum was martyred. Elián suggested subsequent usage may be more related to its meaning than being named after anyone, with linguist María Simón Parra agreeing that this given name in medieval usage (like others based on positive adjectives and nouns) "expressed the hopes and ideals of the people who gave it". Comparatively, Felipe de la Gándara argued for a connection between the Roman Spanish saints Vidal and Marcellus, and opined that their names were likely used as family identifiers, and could have been used in conjunction with each other, as was common among notable families in Roman times. He suggested that both the given name and surname Vidal descend from the martyr.

As a given name, Vidal is one of the Spanish names common among Sephardim. A reason for this, mentioned in the 2006 A Dictionary of First Names, was Jews in Iberia using a preexisting Spanish equivalent of the Hebrew name Haim with the same meaning.

=== Catalan surname etymology ===
As a surname, Vidal was first used in the Catalan language, originating in Barcelona. In the 17th century, Vicente Mares reviewed the surname's origins and, citing Rafael Martí de Viciana, attributed it to 13th century knight Bernardo Vidal, one of the first Christian settlers of Atzeneta del Maestrat in Valencia. The surname's traditional coat of arms is a red background with a silver eagle wearing a golden crown, which was bestowed upon Bernardo Vidal during the siege of Burriana. Royal heraldry chronicler Vicente de Cadenas y Vicent suggested it was first recorded in Barcelona in 1228. Though there are various settlements with the name around Barcelona, Cadenas wrote it was a patronymic. Enric Guinot listed it as one of the common surnames derived from given names.

Historians Monique Bourin and Pascual Martínez Sopena wrote in 2010 that Vidal was one of a group of surnames that likely passed through Aragonese and Occitan as well as Catalan in its history. Linguist Xaverio Ballester, also citing Guinot, wrote the same in 2021, adding that Vidal is therefore "indistinct", i.e. cannot be assigned as belonging to any language in the modern day. Ballester and Guinot suggested that it was originally a staple and common surname in both Catalan and Valencian before being restricted to a "Catalan sphere".

=== Other ===
Chilean historian Luis Thayer Ojeda wrote that in the case of being modified from Vital after migration, the surname Vidal was a "geographical name" of the type that referred to a non-extant location's (e.g. farm) proper name, which would still carry meaning in the country of origin.

== History ==
=== Spain ===
==== Roman Hispania ====
During the Roman rule of the Iberian peninsula, the Catholic martyr Vidal was born in present-day Madrid in the 3rd century. When the Diocletianic Persecution began, Vidal and his companions moved to Campania in exile, but were discovered and martyred in 293 AD near Padua. As Vidal is the Spanish rendering, the given name is mostly associated with this Spanish martyr, whose feast day is celebrated on 2 July, but he is not the only saint named (a version of) Vitalis. There are at least twelve Vidals in the santoral published by La Hormiga de Oro. The earlier martyr Vitalis of Milan (likewise known as Vidal in Spanish) may have contributed to the name being used by others. However, Vidal is practically unknown as a given name outside of Spanish-speaking nations, and has never been particularly common in Spain either.

==== Pre-Spanish kingdoms ====
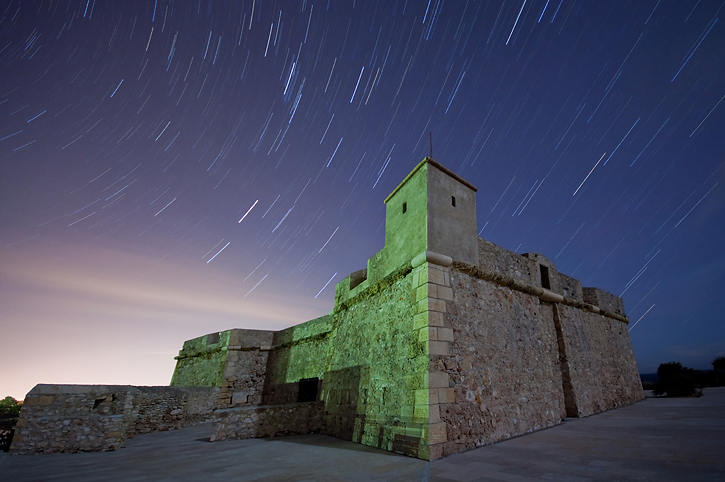
Castell de Sant Jordi d'Alfama; the land grant for this to be built may be the earliest recording of the surname.

Historian Julián del Castillo wrote in the 16th century that Vidal "is a noble surname of knights in the Kingdom of Aragon and Catalonia". The name has been recorded since at least the 12th century in the east of Spain: Peter II of Aragon granted land in Baix Ebre to Martí Vidal in order to build a monastery for the founding of the Order of Sant Jordi d'Alfama. It may also have been a surname in the name of Sancho Vidal, (Note: Though with some date errors, Hispanic toponymy scholar Grace de Jesús C Álvarez referred to Sancho Vidal as "a knight of the Vidal line", which would establish this surname from at least the early 10th century. Sancho Vidal's descendants were permitted to use the hereditary surname Abarca – King Sancho II's epithet – and receive the associated privileges.) a 10th-century knight who discovered a plot to kill the infant prince Sancho II and rescued him.

Mares wrote that by the 1680s the Vidal family had "governed the city of Valencia for three hundred years"; indeed, there were at least twelve members of the Vidal family present when the city was signed over to James I of Aragon in the 13th century, most of whom received land grants. The knight Bernardo Vidal (a relative of, but not the same person as, the Bernardo Vidal from whom Mares said the surname originated) had been an advisor to James I during the conquest of Valencia. According to Francisco Diago, Bernardo Vidal de Besalú (either the advisor Bernardo Vidal or his relative) was courageous in the Battle of the Puig and was thus awarded Carpesa by James I. (Note: The Llibre del Repartiment recorded that Carpesa was given to Bernardo Vidal de Besalú. The Trobes de mossèn Jaume Febrer suggest Vidal sold it back to James I.)

Additionally, Berenguer Vidal was among those entrusted with distribution of lands in the new Kingdom of Valencia and for drawing borders with the Kingdom of Castile; another was Vidal de Canellas, bishop of Huesca in the 13th century. In the 14th century, the bishop of Valencia was called Vidal, third son of the first Vidal de Blanes; bishop Vidal's nephew, Vidal de Blanes (III), became governor of Valencia in 1413.

Vidals were also influential on Catalan culture: Raimon Vidal de Bezaudun (Vidal de Besalú), a Catalan troubadour of the 13th century, is attributed with founding the Consistori del Gay Saber in Toulouse (present day France), a literary and poetry academy for the art of troubadours that also started the tradition of Floral Games in the Catalan-speaking world. The first winner of this event, in 1324, was another Vidal: Occitan writer Arnaut Vidal de Castelnou d'Ari.

In the 14th century, Vidal knights continued to be closely connected to the royal household of Aragon and participated in the Siege of Almería and the Aragonese conquest of Sardinia, while others were royal prosecutors in the kingdom's territories of Roussillon (present day France), Cerdanya (France-Spain border), and Sardinia (present day Italy). Throughout the Aragonese and Catalan period, Vidal was a frequent given name among bishops and abbots.

==== Balearics ====
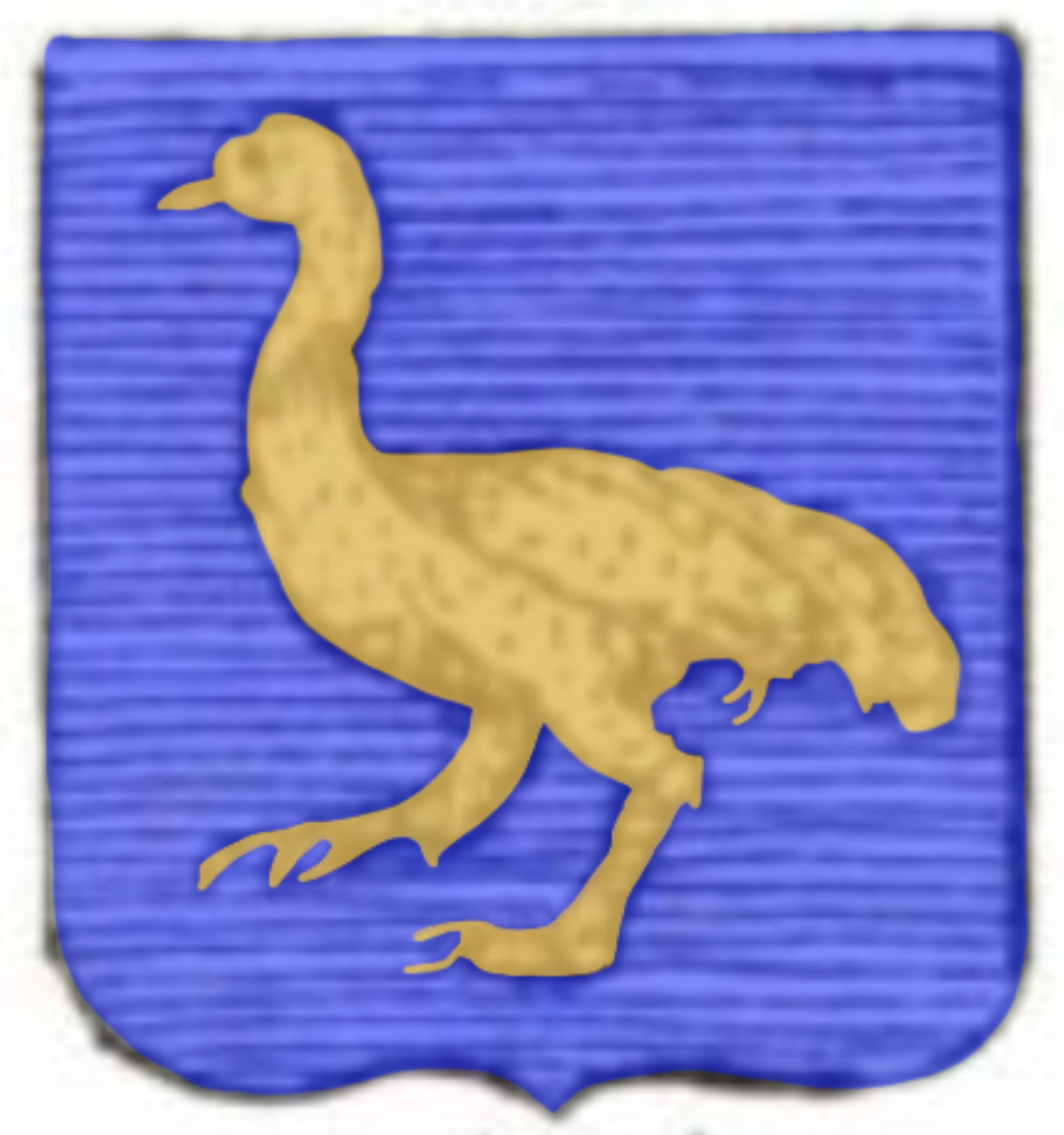
The coat of arms for the Mallorcan Vidal family of Montuïri

Vidal has been identified as a typical Mallorcan surname; linguist Marc Gandarillas noted it is "not properly" Mallorcan, in that it appears across the Catalan-speaking world.

A Pedro Vidal participated in the conquest of Mallorca and was rewarded with Montuïri in 1230 in return; ever since the victory in 1229, this family became rooted in the Kingdom of Mallorca and formed a significant part of its nobility. Branches of this family saw their surname become variants on Vital and Pidal. In the 14th century, there was a deputy for Mallorca called Pedro Vidal, and Berenguer Pitalis was a noted member of Mallorcan nobility who represented the island for Jaume III.

Vidal de Blanes IV, son of the governor of Valencia, was a favourite of Alfonso V due to his service in the Aragonese conquest of Naples; having been taken prisoner with Alfonso at the Battle of Ponza, he was in return awarded the Viceroyalty of Mallorca in 1446.

The surname also has illustrious history on the Balearic island of Menorca, where it was first recorded at the start of the 14th century with Pedro Vital – whose high office required Latinisation of names but whose name would have been Vidal – a deputy for Menorca but based in Perpignan (present day France). The name is found written as Vidal from at least the 15th century, when notary Pedro Vidal was living in Mahón.

There are extensive records from the early 16th century with the Vidal del Rafalet line, (Note: Rafalet being located in present-day Es Castell) members of which held municipal positions in Mahón between 1509 and 1679, including those of Sindico, Bayle and Amostazen. (Note: A Sindico was a member of the council of judges who also performed the everyday running of the Ayuntamiento, and a Bayle was analogous to a bailiff in the sense of overseeing a bailiwick (regions in the Catalan-speaking world could be described as Baylias, bailiwicks; see the modern term batlle). Though these offices held less power than that of the Governor (of the island), the Sindicos and Bayle of Mahón are known to have forced the Governor to back down on at least one occasion, despite threats of punishment, by showing he was subject to the rule of law and the matter had already been previously dismissed. Amostazen was defined as originating from the Arabic-Spanish term almotacén, equating to "judge of weights and measures" (i.e. an overseer of markets); as well as the officeholder title within the Balearic Islands, Amostazen could also refer to rules by which markets were organised in different towns on the islands.) Various members were made captains during this time, having careers in warfare and royal service. Their line, vassals in Mahón, was still producing captains in 1724. Another Vidal line, from Alaior, also held high municipal positions there and produced captains in the 17th century, and the lines of two brothers, Don Juan and D. Domingo Vidal y Segui, were ennobled by Charles III in 1782. The name was very widespread: there was also a peasant farmer called Juan Vidal, recorded in the 17th century due to his bravery in capturing twelve Moors disembarking near Mahón.

==== Modern Spain ====
In the 18th century, Vidal was still a distinguished surname in Aragon, where one line from Magallón had privileges based on descent from a man named in a bull from Pope Clement VII. In 1994, Vidal was the joint-24th most common surname in Barcelona. As of 2014, there were reportedly over 500,000 people with the surname Vidal, making it the 1,019th most common in the world. As of 2016, the surname was proportionally most popular in Castellón and Lleida.

By 1973, about a quarter of all modern Alfarrasí residents still had Vidal as their first surname. The municipality of Alfarrasí was subject to severe depopulation when the Kingdom of Valencia heavily implemented expulsion of the Moriscos in the early 17th century; by 1625, it was nearly completely depopulated due to the banishment of Arabs, with Vidals being among the families moving into the area afterwards. The population has not recovered.

=== Sephardim ===
Xaverio Ballester referred to the given name Vidal as "omnipresent" among Sephardim, which may be due to having a similar meaning as the Hebrew name Haim and thus Jews in Iberia using it as a locally understood equivalent. Ballester noted that, among Jews, Vidal was found most frequently as a given name in Sagunto in the 14th and 15th centuries; Sagunto was one of the first towns in Spain where the Jewish diaspora settled during the Roman era.

The surname, though less than the given name, is also common among the Sephardi diaspora. The 2015 UPF study noted speculation of a Jewish origin for some lines of the surname – as a possible direct translation of Haim, a claim first found in Toponimos en apellidos hispanos from 1968, which referred to French Jews doing so – but actually found that the proportion of Y chromosomes with potential Jewish origin among Vidal subjects is, at most, the 10% average observed across the general Spanish population. (Note: I.e. making it statistically less likely that someone with the surname Vidal has a Jewish ancestor than is typical.) Gonzalo Álvarez Chillida and Ricardo Izquierdo Benito, experts on antisemitism in Spain, noted that proliferation of the surname among the Sephardi diaspora is instead due to the known fact of conversos taking such Catalan names upon conversion, "even those [names] of noble benefactors" (i.e. Vidal).

Although the surname lacks a Jewish origin and is not associated with Judaism within Spain, Álvarez and Izquierdo wrote that it being widespread among Jewish communities is "not surprising", given the general commonality of the name; they considered the proliferation of Vidal specifically among the reasons why identifying Spanish Jewish names (rather than Spanish names taken by Jews) is difficult. Ballester, in discussion of Spanish surnames of Jews in the Kingdom of Valencia, came to the same conclusion but (while acknowledging its general commonality in Valencia) did suggest Vidal was among the "more characteristically [Jewish]" names and that there was historical association.

Historically, the surname is among the 276 found in records of the Spanish Inquisition that were used to identify supposed Judaizers, those who promoted Jewish practice; this list mostly comprised the surnames of defendants tried before the Cremadissa in 1691, and so is neither an accurate reflection of Jews persecuted by the Inquisition nor of Jewish families of the time. Josep Maria Albaigès, also citing Mallorcan Xueta historian and writer of converso descent Miquel Forteza, noted that the names on the Inquisition list were "the most common in Catalonia and even in Spain", and that "this destroyed any fantasy about the existence of specifically Jewish surnames." Vidal did not appear in Albaigès' list of Jewish surnames; it was included in his list of surnames associated with Xuetes (Mallorcan conversos), which he compiled to demonstrate the fallacy of Jewish surnames of the time and thus the arbitrary nature of their discrimination and segregation. (Note: Albaigès introduced this list as being the exemplification of the fallacy; also on the list, for example, are García (comparable in commonality to English Smith), Ferrer (literally Smith), Domingo and Doménech (devoutly Christian names), and – among those noted as "especially segregated" – Piña.)

=== Latin America ===
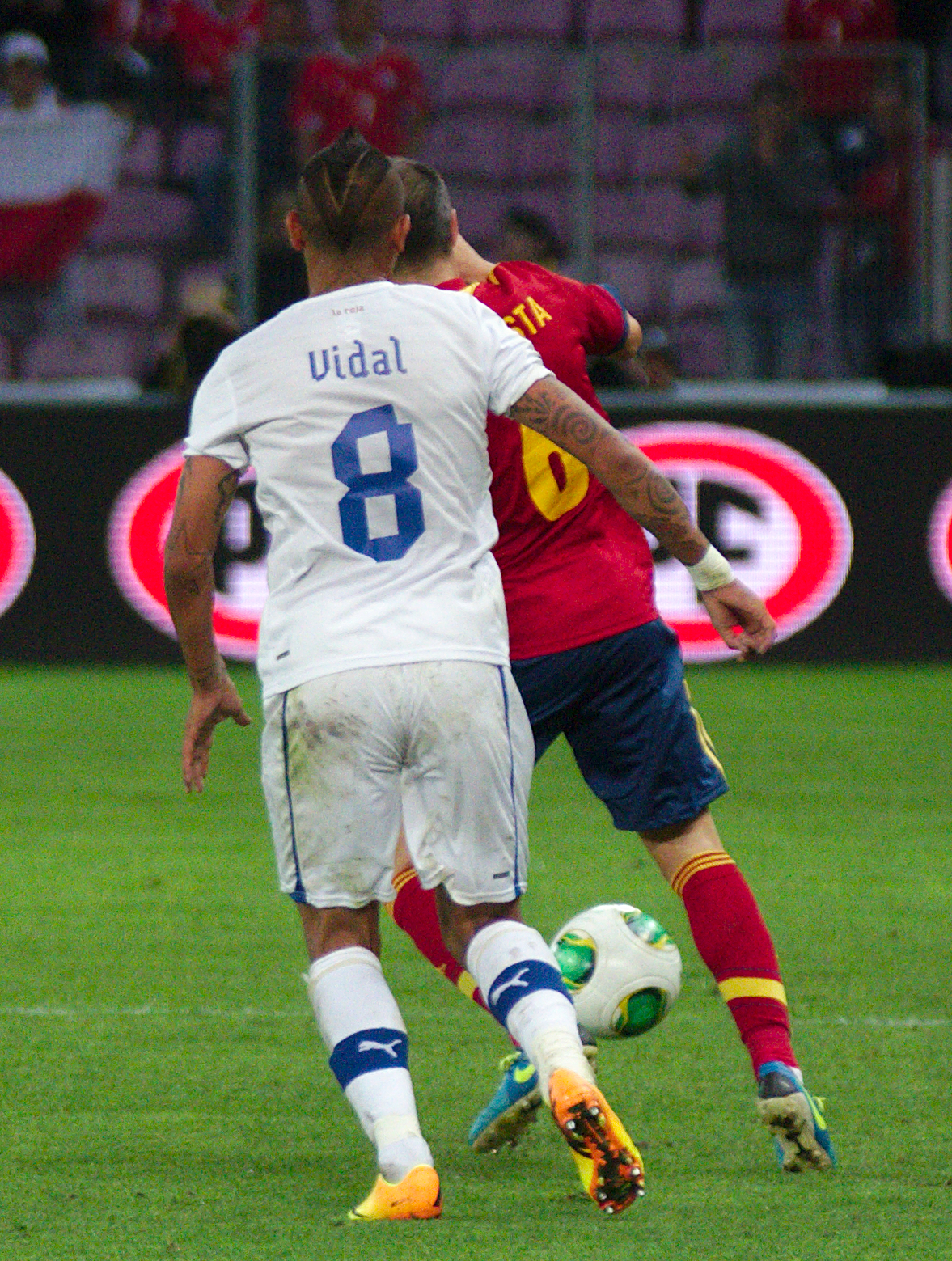
The back of Chilean footballer Arturo Vidal's shirt in 2013

The surname had arrived in Latin America by the 17th century, when a Bartolomé Vidal was an organiser in Michoacán. Vidal was among the 500 most common masculine given names, and 750 most common surnames, in Latin America in 1968; by capital city, it was among the most common surnames in Buenos Aires, Caracas, La Paz, Lima, Mexico City, Montevideo, and Santiago.

In the late 18th century in Haiti, a Mr. Vidal was recorded to have kidnapped 500 men from a prison in Port-au-Prince in order to traffic them to Cartagena and Portobelo. In 19th-century Uruguay, the surname appeared as that of slaves and of a non-white soldier during the war in Banda Oriental. Though Catalan surnames were less common in Venezuela than its neighbours, Vidal was among those reported in the 20th century. In Chile in the 21st century, surnames are social indicators, a phenomenon Chilean journalist Óscar Contardo explained by comparing Vial (a "buen apellido" with strong social cache) and the orthographically and phonologically similar Vidal: "The supposition doesn't make any sense, unless it is about a fellow Chilean and a comparison between surnames. Because a Vial will never ever be the same as a Vidal. There are Vidal's who would kill to be Vial's".

== People ==
Vidal may refer to:

=== Surname ===
==== A ====
- Adrián Vidal (1845–1865), Mexican-American soldier
- Agustín Vidal (born 1987), Argentine handball player
- Aina Vidal (born 1985), Spanish politician
- Alan Vidal (born 1993), Mexican footballer
- Albert Riera Vidal (born 1983), Spanish footballer
- Aleix Vidal (born 1989), Spanish footballer
- Alejandro Vidal (1897–?), Chilean cyclist
- Alejo Vidal-Quadras Roca (born 1945), Spanish politician
- Alessandra Vidal de Negreiros Negrini (born 1970), Brazilian actress
- Alexander Thomas Emeric Vidal (1792–1863), British admiral and surveyor
- Alexander Vidal (1819–1906), Canadian politician
- Alexander Vidal Ceballos (born 1996), Dominican footballer
- Alexandre Vidal Porto, Brazilian writer
- Alfredo Arróniz Vidal (1902–1976), Spanish footballer
- Alondra Carrillo Vidal (born 1991), Chilean psychologist
- Álvaro Vidal Rivadeneyra (1942–2025), Peruvian politician
- Amílcar Vidal (born 1996), Uruguayan boxer
- Ana María Vidal (born 1944), Spanish actress
- Ana Vidal (born 1984), Spanish–American poet
- André Vidal (1908–1984), French engineer and politician
- André Vidal de Negreiros (1606–1680), Brazilian-Portuguese colonial governor
- Ángel Galarza Vidal (1856–1943), Spanish politician
- Angelina Vidal (1847–1917), Portuguese writer
- Àngels Bardina Vidal (born 1980), Spanish swimmer
- Annie Vidal (born 1956), French politician
- Antonio Vidal (footballer) (1923–1999), Spanish footballer
- Antonio Vidal (artist) (1928–2013), Cuban artist
- Antonio Vidal González (born 1964), Argentine footballer
- Antonio Vidal-Puig (born 1962), Spanish doctor and scientist
- Arnaut Vidal de Castelnou d'Ari, Occitan troubadour in the 14th century
- Artemio Gutiérrez Vidal (1860–1936), Chilean tailor, labour leader and politician
- Arturo Vidal (born 1987), Chilean footballer
- Asun Ortega Vidal (born 1981), Spanish actress, singer-songwriter and model
- Ava Vidal (born 1976), British comedian

==== B ====
- Bartolomé Salvá Vidal (born 1986), Spanish tennis coach
- Benjamín Vidal (born 1991), Chilean footballer
- Bernard Vidal (born 1944), French painter
- Bernardo Elías Vidal (born 1976), Colombian politician
- Berta Elena Vidal de Battini (1900–1984), Argentine writer
- Bill Vidal (born 1951), American politician and civil servant
- Blanca Vidal (1885–1962), Spanish-Argentine actress

==== C ====
- Caio Vidal (born 2000), Brazilian footballer
- Camille Vidal-Naquet (born 1972), French film director
- Carles Blasi Vidal (born 1964), Andorran politician
- Carles Salvador Vidal (born 1990), Spanish footballer
- Carlos Cat Vidal (1930–2006), Uruguayan politician
- Carlos Souto Vidal (born 1976), Spanish rugby union player
- Carlos Vidal (1902–1982), Chilean footballer
- Carlos Vidal Bolado (1914–1996), Cuban conga drummer
- Carlos Vidal Layseca (1931–2017), Peruvian physician
- Carmen Vidal (1915–2003), Spanish businesswoman
- Carolina Arias Vidal (born 1990), Colombian footballer
- Catherine Vidal (born 1951), French neurobiologist
- Catherine Vidal (actress) (born 1976), Quebecois performer and theatre director
- César Vidal (born 1970), Swedish singer
- César Vidal Manzanares (born 1958), Spanish historian
- Cheche Vidal (born 1959), Venezuelan footballer
- Cheryl-Lynn Vidal, Trinidadian lawyer
- Christian Vidal (born 1972), Argentine guitarist
- Christina Vidal (born 1981), American actress
- Clara Vidal (born 1983), Venezuelan politician
- Clarita Vidal (1883–1919), actress
- Claudina Vidal (born 1951), Uruguayan footballer
- Claudine Vidal (born 1937), French sociologist
- Claudio Vidal (born 1980), Argentine politician
- Clément Vidal (born 2000), French footballer
- Corey Vidal (born 1986), Canadian YouTuber
- Crescas Vidal, French Jewish philosopher in the 14th century
- Cristiano Vidal (born 1996), Brazilian footballer

==== D ====
- Daniel & Diego Vega Vidal (born 1973 & 1974), Peruvian filmmakers
- Dani Vidal (footballer) (born 2000), Spanish footballer
- Dani Vidal (football manager) (born 1992), Spanish football manager
- Daniel Vidal Fuster (born 1975), Spanish swimmer
- Daniele Vidal (born 1952), French singer
- David Vidal (born 1950), Spanish football manager
- David Vidal (baseball) (born 1989), Puerto Rican baseball player
- Denis Vidal (born 1954), French anthropologist
- Diego Vidal de Liendo (1622–1648), Spanish Baroque painter
- Dionís Vidal, Valencian Baroque painter
- Dolors Monserdà i Vidal (1845–1919), Catalan writer
- Dominique Vidal (born 1964), French businessman
- Dora María Pérez Vidal (1933–2023), Mexican singer
- Doriane Vidal (born 1976), French snowboarder
- Douglas Vidal Jiménez (born 1971), Salvadoran footballer and sports executive

==== E ====
- Édier Ocampo Vidal (born 2003), Colombian footballer
- Eduardo Vidal, Chilean bass guitarist
- Eileen Vidal (1926–2003), kelper telephone and radio operator
- Eladio Vidal (1897–?), Spanish wrestler
- Elaine Watt-Hugo-Vidal (1929–1985), American equestrienne
- Elena Maria Vidal (born 1962), American writer
- Eliseo Vidal (born 1951), Cuban swimmer
- Elizabeth Vidal (born 1960), French singer
- Eloy Vidal (1951–2004), Chilean footballer
- Emeric Essex Vidal (1791–1861), English watercolourist
- Emiliano Villar Vidal (born 1999), Uruguayan footballers
- Emilio Mola y Vidal (1887–1937), Spanish military officer
- Emilio Ratia Vidal (born 1968), Spanish diver
- Emilio Vidal (actor) (1918–1994), Uruguayan actor
- Emilio Vidal (cyclist) (born 1929), Venezuelan Olympic cyclist
- Emilio Vidal (wrestler) (1897–?), Spanish Olympic wrestler
- Enrique Benavent Vidal (born 1959), Spanish prelate of the Catholic Church
- Eric Vidal, American DJ
- Ernesto Vidal (1921–1974), Uruguayan footballer
- Esteban Vidal, 19th century Puerto Rican politician
- Eugene Luther Vidal (1895–1969), American athlete and aviation pioneer
- Eugène Vincent Vidal (1850–1908), French painter
- Ezequiel Vidal (footballer, born 1987) (born 1987), Argentine footballer
- Ezequiel Vidal (footballer, born 1995) (born 1995), Argentine footballer

==== F ====
- Fey Silva Vidal (born 1966), Peruvian meteorologist
- Francesc Guàrdia Vidal, Valencian architect
- Francisco Antonino Vidal (1827–1889), president of Uruguay
- Francisco Canals Vidal (1922–2009), Spanish philosopher
- Francisco Huerta Vidal (born 1967), Chilean footballer and manager
- Francisco Ponzán Vidal (1911–1944), Catalan political exile and spy
- Francisco Pulgar Vidal (1929–2012), Peruvian composer
- Francisco Vidal (actor) (1941–2023), Spanish actor
- Francisco Vidal y Barraquer (1868–1943), Catalan Roman Catholic Cardinal
- Francisco Vidal Garcés (1878-1945), Chilean lawyer and politician
- Francisco Vidal Gormaz (1837–1907), Chilean navy officer and hydrographer
- Francisco Vidal Salinas (born 1953), Chilean politician
- François Vidal (1832–1911), French Provençal poet
- Frédérique Vidal (born 1964), Monegasque biochemist and academic administrator

==== G ====
- Gabriel Vidal (born 1969), Spanish footballer
- Gary Vidal (born 1965), Canadian politician
- Gaston Vidal (1888–1949), French politician and sports leader
- George William Vidal (1845–1907), British civil servant in India
- Gilberto Martínez Vidal (born 1979), Costa Rican footballer
- Gilles Vidal (born 1972), French car designer
- Gisela Vidal (1940–2022), Venezuelan athlete
- Gore Vidal (1925–2012), American writer
- Gregori Lavilla i Vidal (born 1973), Spanish motorcycle racer
- Guido Vidal França Schaffer (1974–2009), Brazilian Venerable
- Guifré Vidal, Spanish physicist
- Gustave Prosper Vidal (1835–1905), French botanist

==== H ====
- Héctor Manuel Vidal (1943–2014), Uruguayan theater director
- Henri Vidal (1919–1959), French actor
- Henri Vidal (engineer) (1924–2007), French civil engineer
- Henri Vidal (sculptor) (1864–1918), French sculptor
- Hernán García de Gonzalo de Tejada y Vidal (born 1928), Chilean diplomat
- Hernán Petryk Vidal (born 1994), Uruguayan footballer
- Hernane Vidal de Souza (born 1986), Brazilian footballer
- Higor Vidal (born 1996), Brazilian footballer
- Hilda Vidal Valdés (born 1941), Cuban artist

==== I ====
- Ignacio Peña Vidal (born 1973), Puerto Rican musician
- Ignacio Vidal-Folch (born 1956), Spanish writer
- Ignasi Vidal (1904–1988), Catalan painter and illustrator
- Ingrid Vidal (born 1991), Colombian footballer
- Irma Vidal Santaella (1924–2009), Puerto Rican judge
- Isabel Pinto de Vidal (1885–1969), Uruguayan feminist lawyer and politician
- Isona Passola i Vidal, president of the Catalan Film Academy

==== J ====
- Jacob ben Chayyim Comprat Vidal Farissol, French Jewish scholar in the 15th century
- Jaime Agudelo Vidal (1925–2009), Colombian comedian and actor
- Jaime González Vidal (born 1977), Chilean footballer
- Jair Reyes Vidal (born 2000), Ecuadorian weightlifter
- Janice Vidal (born 1982), Hong Kong singer
- Javan Vidal (born 1989), British footballer
- Javier Pulgar Vidal link (1911–2003), Peruvian geographer
- Jean Baptiste Émile Vidal (1825–1893), French dermatologist
- Jeanne Vidal (1908–1999), French fencer
- Jean-Pierre Vidal (born 1977), French alpine skier
- Jesús María Duñabeitia Vidal (1929–2013), Basque politician and football executive
- Jesús Puras Vidal de la Peña (born 1963), Spanish rally driver
- Jesús Samper Vidal (1950–2015), Spanish businessman
- Jesús Vidal (born 1975), Spanish actor
- Jill Vidal (born 1982), Hong Kong singer
- Jinky Vidal, Filipino singer
- Jó Vidal (born 1995), Angolan footballer
- Joan Campins Vidal (born 1995), Spanish footballer
- Joan-Josep Tharrats i Vidal (1918–2001), Catalan art theorist
- Joana Marques Vidal (1955–2024), Attorney General of Portugal
- João Antonio "Juan" Vidal (born 1945), Spanish musician
- Joaquina de Vedruna Vidal de Mas (1783–1854), Spanish Catholic nun
- John Vidal, Irish-American pirate
- Jon Xabier Vidal (born 1991), Spanish footballer
- Jordi Vidal, Spanish drummer
- Jorge Medina Vidal (1925–2008), Uruguayan poet
- Jorge Molina Vidal (born 1982), Spanish footballer
- Jorge Moreno San Vidal (born 2001), Spanish footballer
- Jorge Vidal (gymnast) (1917–?), Argentine gymnast
- Jorge Vidal (field hockey) (born 1943), Spanish field hockey player
- José Ángel Vidal (born 1969), Spanish cyclist
- José María de Palleja Ferrer-Vidal (1891–1964), Spanish sports shooter
- José María Vidal (1935–1986), Spanish footballer
- Don José Vidal (1763–1823), Spanish colonial administrator
- José Vidal (baseball) (1940–2011), Dominican baseball player
- José Vidal (Uruguayan footballer) (1896–1974), Uruguayan footballer
- José Vidal (Venezuelan footballer) (1938–2019), Venezuelan footballer
- José Vidal Cadellans (1928–1960), Spanish novelist
- José Vidal Porcar (1924–1992), Spanish racing cyclist
- José Vidal-Ribas (1888–1959), Spanish sports executive
- José Vidal Ribas (businessman) (1814–1870), Spanish businessman, druggist, and slave owner
- Josefina Vidal (born 1961), Cuban diplomat
- Joseph Vidal (1933–2020), French politician
- Joseph Vidal (composer) (1859–1924), French composer
- Joseph Vidal ibn Labi, Spanish Jewish scholar in the 15th century
- Josette Vidal (born 1993), Venezuelan actress
- Jovino Novoa Vidal (1822–1892), Chilean politician
- Juan Beckmann Vidal (born 1940), Mexican billionaire
- Juan Carlos Girauta Vidal (born 1961), Spanish politician
- Juan Carlos Madrid Vidal (born 1975), Chilean footballer
- Juan Carlos Ríos Vidal (born 1964), Spanish football manager
- Juan Carlos Vidal (born 1954), Spanish footballer
- Juan Fortuny Vidal (1946–2024), Spanish swimmer
- Juan Francisco de Vidal (1800–1863), President of Peru from 1842 to 1843
- Juan Manuel Masferrer Vidal (born 1980), Chilean politician
- Juan Pablo Raba Vidal (born 1977), Colombian actor
- Juan Sánchez Vidal (born 1958), Spanish collector
- Juan Vidal (born 1977), Dominican actor
- Juliette Vidal (born 1999), French footballer

==== K ====
- Kathi Vidal (born 1968), former head of the U.S. Patent & Trademark Office
- Kevin Vidal, Canadian actor
- Kimani Vidal (born 2001), American football player
- Klistan Lawrence Vidal (born 2003), Puerto Rican volleyball player

==== L ====
- Laurent Vidal (1984–2015), French triathlete
- Leona Vidal Roberts (born 1972), Falkland Islands politician
- Leoncio Vidal (1864–1896), Cuban revolutionary
- Leopolda Gassó y Vidal (1849–1885), Spanish writer, painter, essayist, and women's rights activist
- Liborio Vidal Aguilar (born 1963), Mexican politician
- Lisa Vidal (born 1965), American actress
- Lise Vidal (1977–2021), French windsurfer
- Loreto Vidal (born 1970), Chilean politician
- Lucas Vidal (born 1984), Spanish composer
- Luis Aloy Vidal (1930–2012), Spanish footballer and manager
- Luis Valcarce Vidal (born 1993), Spanish footballer
- Luis Vidal Vargas (1904–1989), Chilean military officer and politician
- Luis Vidal (footballer, born 1916) (1916–1999), Chilean footballer and manager
- Luis Vidal (footballer, born 1952) (born 1952), Chilean footballer
- Luis Vidal (architect) (born 1969), Spanish architect
- Luz Vidal (born 1973), Mapuche Chilean domestic worker, union leader, and politician

==== LL ====
- Llorenç Vidal Vidal (born 1936), Mallorcan poet
- Lluïsa Vidal (1876–1918), Catalan painter

==== M ====
- Maïa Vidal (born 1988), American musician
- Maikel Vidal (born 2000), Cuban long jumper
- Manon Vidal (born 1999), Belgian politician
- Manuel Lobo i Vidal (1904–1983), Spanish field hockey player
- Manuel Gual Vidal (1903–1954), Mexican jurist
- Manuel Pulgar-Vidal (born 1962), Peruvian lawyer
- Manuel Vidal (footballer) (1901–1965), Spanish footballer
- Manuel Vidal Fernández (born 1929), Cuban artist
- Marc Vidal (footballer, born 1991), French football goalkeeper
- Marc Vidal (footballer, born 2000), Spanish football goalkeeper
- Marc Vidal (chef) (born 1977), Spanish chef in the U.S.
- Marcelo Vidal, Argentine drummer
- Marcelo Vidal (born 1991), Argentine footballer
- Marco Vidal (born 1986), American soccer player
- Marcos Vidal (born 1971), German-Spanish singer-songwriter
- María Carmen África Vidal Claramonte (born 1964), Spanish scholar and author
- María-Esther Vidal, Venezuelan scientist
- María Eugenia Vidal (born 1973), Argentine politician
- María Pujalte Vidal (born 1966), Spanish actress
- Maria Vidal (born 1956), American singer
- María Vilas Vidal (born 1996), Spanish swimmer
- Mariano Vidal Molina (1925–1996), Argentine actor
- Mario Vargas Vidal (born 1963), Chilean teacher and politician
- Marta Andrade Vidal (born 1972), Spanish figure skater
- Mary Theresa Vidal (1815–1873), Australian writer
- Mateo Vidal (1780–1855), Uruguayan priest and politician
- Matt Vidal, British-American sociologist
- Maurice Vidal Portman (1860–1935), British naval officer
- Mauricio Vidal, Colombian cinematographer
- Mercè Capsir i Vidal (1895–1969), Catalan opera singer
- Mey Vidal (born 1984), Cuban musician
- Michel Vidal (1824–1895), French-American politician
- Miguel Rodríguez Vidal (born 2003), Spanish footballer
- Miquel Vidal (born 1960), Spanish politician
- Mirta Vidal, Argentina-born American intersectionalist writer
- Moncho Fernández Vidal (born 1969), Spanish basketball coach
- Moreno Aoas Vidal (born 1983), Brazilian footballer

==== N ====
- Nacho Vidal (born 1973), Spanish porn actor and producer
- Nacho Vidal (footballer) (born 1995), Spanish footballer
- Nick Vidal, American DJ
- Nicolás María Vidal (1739–1806), Colombian-Spanish colonial official
- Nina Vidal, American singer-songwriter
- Noelia López Vidal (born 1986), Spanish model

==== O ====
- Odette Vidal Oliveira (1930–1939), Brazilian child considered for beatification
- Olivier Ayache-Vidal (born 1969), French film director and screenwriter
- Oriol Romeu Vidal (born 1991), Spanish footballer
- Óscar René Brayson Vidal (born 1985), Cuban judoka
- Oscar Vidal Gutiérrez (born 1960), Mexican doctor
- Owen Vidal (1819–1854), Anglican Bishop of Sierra Leone

==== P ====
- Pablo López Vidal (born 1977), Spanish footballer and manager
- Pablo Pacheco Vidal (1908–1982), Peruvian footballer
- Pablo Valcarce Vidal (born 1993), Spanish footballer
- Pablo Vidal (born 1983), Chilean politician
- Pancho Casal Vidal (born 1955), Spanish politician
- Patricio Vidal (Argentine footballer) (born 1992), Argentine footballer
- Patrick Vidal (born 1957), French musician
- Pau Vidal (footballer, born 1920) (1920–2004), Mallorcan footballer
- Pau Vidal (footballer, born 2002) (born 2002), Spanish footballer
- Paul Vidal (1863–1931), French musician
- Paul Vidal de La Blache (1845–1918), French geographer
- Peire Vidal, Occitan troubadour in the 12th century
- Pepelu Vidal (born 1995), Spanish footballer
- Petra Vela de Vidal Kenedy (1823–1885), Mexican rancher, philanthropist, and matriarch
- Philip Vidal Streich, American scientist
- Pierre Vidal (composer) (1927–2010), French composer
- Pierre Vidal-Naquet (1930–2006), French historian

==== Q ====
- Queralt Vidal (born 2000), Catalan social media personality
- Quim Vidal (born 1999), Spanish golfer

==== R ====
- Rafael Quiñones Vidal (1892–1988), Puerto Rican journalist
- Rafael Vidal (1964–2005), Venezuelan swimmer and sports commentator
- Rai Marchán Vidal (born 1993), Spanish footballer
- Raimon Vidal de Bezaudun, Catalan troubadour in the 13th century
- Ramon Strauch i Vidal (1760–1823), Catalan Roman Catholic bishop
- Ramon Vidal, Catalan guitarist
- Raúl García-Vidal (1930–2020), Cuban swimmer
- Raúl Vidal (born 1994), Mexican footballer
- Raul Vidal y Sepulveda, Puerto Rican activist
- Ray Vidal, American musician
- René Vidal (politician) (1931–2012), Bolivian politician
- René Vidal (engineer) (born 1974), Chilean computer scientist
- René Vidal Basauri, Chilean army officer and government minister
- René Vidal Merino (1901–1987), Chilean army officer and politician
- Ricardo Vidal (1931–2017), Filipino cardinal-priest and archbishop
- Ricardo Vidal (athlete) (1930–2010), Chilean runner
- Ricardo Vidal Brown (born 1957), Filipino-American basketball player
- Robert Studley Vidal (1770–1841), English barrister
- Robert Vidal (cyclist) (born 1933), French cyclist
- Roberto Vidal Bolaño (1950–2002), Galician playwright and actor
- Rocío Vidal (born 1989), Spanish cartoonist and illustrator
- Romina Vidal-Russell, Argentine botanist
- Rómulo Cúneo y Vidal (1856–1931), Peruvian intellectual, historian, writer and diplomat

==== S ====
- Salvador Vidal (died 1541), Aragonese priest and first person executed by the Spanish Inquisition for sodomy
- Sammy Vidal (born 1996), French footballer
- Santiago Morandi Vidal (born 1984), Uruguayan football goalkeeper
- Sean Vidal, Canadian guitarist
- Sebastián Ferreira Vidal (born 1998), Paraguayan footballer
- Sebastián Vidal (born 1989), Argentine footballer
- Sebastián Vidal y Soler (1842–1889), Spanish forester and botanist
- Sebastien Vidal (born 1989), Guatemalan tennis player
- Sergi Vidal (born 1981), Spanish basketball player
- Sergio Souto Vidal (born 1976), Spanish rugby union player
- Seth Vidal (died 2013), software developer
- Sheree Hazel Vidal Bautista (born 1989), Filipino actress and singer
- Silvia Núñez del Arco Vidal (born 1988), Peruvian writer
- Silvia Vidal (born 1970), Spanish mountaineer
- Silvino Vidal (1850–1937), Portuguese writer
- Simonne Vidal (1894–1944), French housewife

==== T ====
- Teodoro Vidal (1923–2016), Puerto Rican art historian

==== U ====
- Úrsula Vidal (born 1972), Brazilian journalist and politician

==== V ====
- Valentín Vidal (born 2004), Chilean footballer
- Vanessa Lima Vidal (born 1984), Brazilian model, beach volleyball player and beauty pageant contestant
- Vanessa Vidal (born 1974), French alpine skier
- Velia Vidal (born 1982), Colombian activist
- Vicenç Vidal (born 1980), Spanish politician
- Vicente Alberti y Vidal (1786–1859), Spanish writer
- Victor Carton Vidal (1902–1970), Irish politician
- Victoria Escandell-Vidal, Spanish professor of linguistics
- Vidal (footballer, born 1896) (1896–?), Brazilian footballer
- Vincent Vidal (1811–1887), French painter

==== W ====
- Walpole Vidal (1853–1914), English footballer

==== X ====
- Xavier Trias i Vidal de Llobatera (born 1946), Catalan politician
- Ximena Vidal (born 1955), Chilean actress and politician
- Xiomara Vidal (born 1955), Cuban trovadora

==== Y ====
- Yuri González Vidal (born 1981), Cuban chess grandmaster
- Yves Vidal (born 1946), French politician

==== Z ====
- Zósimo Vicuña Vidal (1929–?), Peruvian pharmacist and politician

=== Given name ===
==== First name ====
- Vidal (martyr) (died 293), Roman Catholic saint
- Vidal (troubadour) (14th century), Portuguese Jewish poet
- Vidal de Canellas, 13th century bishop who compiled the first laws of Aragon
- Vidal of Tolosa, Spanish rabbi in the 14th century
- Vidal Alcocer (1801–1860), Mexican philanthropist
- Vidal Astori, Aragon silversmith in the 15th century
- Vidal Basco (born 1996), Bolivian runner
- Vidal Benveniste, Spanish rabbi in the 15th century
- Vidal Benveniste de Porta (died 1268), Aragon tax collector
- Vidal Bruján (born 1998), Dominican baseball player
- Vidal Cantu (born 1968), Mexican film producer
- Vidal Davis, American music producer
- Vidal Fernandez (born 1958), American soccer player
- Vidal Francisco Soberón Sanz (born 1953), Mexican admiral
- Vidal Hazelton (born 1988), American football player
- Vidal Llerenas Morales (born 1972), Mexican politician
- Vidal López (1918–1971), Venezuelan baseball player and manager
- Vidal Marín del Campo (1653–1709), Spanish bishop and Grand Inquisitor of Spain
- Vidal Medina (born 1976), Mexican playwright and theatre director
- Vidal Morales y Morales (1848–1904), Cuban lawyer, writer, and historian
- Vidal Nuño (born 1987), American baseball player
- Vidal Prevost, American hip-hop performer previously known as V-Dal
- Vidal Ramos (politician) (1866–1954), Brazilian politician
- Vidal Sancho (born 1977), Spanish actor
- Vidal Santiago Díaz (1910–1982), Puerto Rican politician
- Vidal Sassoon (1928–2012), British hairdresser and businessman
- Vidal Taroç, Catalan Jewish landowner in the 13th century
- Vidal Vega (1964–2012), Paraguayan politician

==== Other given name ====
- Arthur Vidal Diehl (1870–1929), English painter
- Borja Vidal Fernández Fernández (born 1981), Spanish-Qatari handball player known as Borja Vidal
- Carlos Vidal Arroyo Molina (born 2001), Ecuadorian footballer
- Carlos Vidal Sanabria Acuña (born 1967), Paraguayan footballer known as Vidal Sanabria
- Félix Vidal Celis Zabala (born 1982), Spanish cyclist known as Vidal Celis
- Gerson Vidal Izaguirre (born 1995), Venezuelan athlete
- Haïm Vidal Séphiha (1923–2019), Belgian-French linguist
- Hayyim Vidal Angel, Ottoman Greek rabbi in the 18th century
- Jordi Vidal Martín Rojas (born 1991), Spanish footballer known as Jordi Vidal
- José Vidal Bolivar Ormeño (born 2000), Peruvian footballer
- Romárico Vidal Sotomayor García (1938–2024), Cuban politician

=== Pseudonyms ===
==== From Vidal ====
- Brays Efe (born Brays Fernández Vidal), Spanish actor
- Chicão (footballer, born 1962) (born Francisco Carlos Martins Vidal), Brazilian footballer
- Earl Liberty (born Mark Vidal), American bass guitarist
- Maria Montez (born María África Gracia Vidal), Dominican actress
- Marquinhos Carioca (born Marcus Vinícius Vidal Cunha), Brazilian footballer
- Menachem HaMeiri (born Vidal Solomon), Provençal rabbi
- NoCap (born Kobe Vidal Crawford Jr.), American rapper
- Rels B (born Daniel Heredia Vidal), Spanish singer
- Stwo (born Steven Vidal), French musician

==== To Vidal ====
- Ernst Fischer (writer), who used the pseudonym Pierre Vidal
- Moses of Narbonne, also known as maestro Vidal Blasom

=== Fictional characters ===
- Angustio Vidal, comic strip title character created by Rojas de la Cámara
- Death / Rio Vidal (Marvel Cinematic Universe)
- The Vidal brothers in The Secret of Wilhelm Storitz (1910 novel)
- The Vidal family in Verano del '98 (1998–2000 telenovela)

== See also ==
- Georges-Fernand Widal
- René Bidal
- Francis de Saint-Vidal
