= Vitalii =

Russian and Ukrainian given name

- Gender: male

Origin
- Origin: Russian, Ukrainian
- Meaning: vital, viable, the one who gives life
- Region of origin: Ancient Rome

Other names
- Related names: Vital, Vidal, Waldek, Vitale, Vitalio, Vitale, Vitalis, Witalis, Vitalie, Vital, Witala

Vitalii (Russian: Вита́лий, pronounced [vʲɪˈtalʲɪj]; Ukrainian: Віта́лій, pronounced [wiˈtɑl⁽ʲ⁾ij]) is a masculine given name of Ancient Roman origin. In ancient Rome, the name Vitalis was a nickname. There was also a related cognomen (generic nickname) Vitalianus, which literally translates as "belonging to Vitalis". The female version of the name is Vitalina (Russian: Витали́на, pronounced [vʲɪtɐˈlʲinə]; Ukrainian: Віталі́на, pronounced [witɐˈl⁽ʲ⁾inɐ]).

The name Vіtalіi came to the Kievan Rus' with the arrival of Christianity from Byzantium. According to V. A. Nikonov, in 1988 the name in the USSR was rare.

Male diminutives include Vitalik, Vitalenka, Vital, Vitalia, Vitasia, Vitulik, Talii, Talik, Talia; female: Vita, Vitalinka, Vitalia, Vitasia, Vitasha, Vitakha, Lina, Talina, Tal.

== People known as Vitalii ==
- Vitalii Bairak (1907–1946), Ukrainian Catholic priest and blessed hieromartyr of the Ukrainian Greek Catholic Church
- Vitalii Bezghin (born 1990), Ukrainian politician
- Vitalii Demianiuk (born 1971), Ukrainian engineer and philanthropist
- Vitaly Kaloyev (born 1956), Russian man who lost his family in the Überlingen mid-air collision and murdered ATC controller Peter Nielsen
- Vitalii Klychko (born 1971), Ukrainian boxer and politician
- Vitalii Masol (1928–2018), former Prime Minister of Ukraine (headed the government: July 1987 – October 1990)
- Vitalii Mykolenko (born 1999), Ukrainian footballer
- Vitaly Portnikov (born 1967), Ukrainian editor and journalist
- Vitalii Sediuk (born 1988), Ukrainian prankster and former media reporter
- Vitalina Koval (born 1990), Ukrainian LGBTI human rights defender

== Name-day ==
=== Christianity ===
- Catholic Church: January 9, February 14, April 2, April 21, April 28, 16 May (UGCC), July 2, July 10, August 29, September 1, September 22, October 16, October 20, November 3, November 4.
- Orthodox Church: January 11, January 25, April 22, April 28,

== See also ==
- Vitali
