= Vidalis =

Vidalis is a surname. Notable people with the surname include:

- George Vidalis, Australian actor
- Giannis Vidalis (born 1997), Greek footballer

== See also ==
- Vidale
- Vidales
- Vidali
- Vitale
