= Vital =

Vital or Vitals may refer to:

== Places ==
- Vital Creek, a creek located in the Omineca Country region of British Columbia
- Vital Range, a subrange in the Omineca Mountains in British Columbia

== People ==
- Vital (given name)
- Vital (surname)

== Arts, entertainment, and media ==
=== Music ===
- Vital (Anberlin album), 2012
- Vital (Fernando Otero album), a 2010 album by Fernando Otero
- Vital (Van der Graaf Generator album), 1978
- Vital, a 2009 studio album by Norman Bedard
- Vitals (album), a 2015 albujm by Mutemath

=== Other uses in arts, entertainment, and media ===
- Vital (film), a 2004 Japanese movie directed by Shinya Tsukamoto
- Vitals (novel), a 2002 science fiction/techno-thriller novel by Greg Bear

== Other uses ==
- Vital (grape), a Portuguese wine grape grown in the Alcobaça wine region
- Vital (Sri Aurobindo), term in the philosophy of Sri Aurobindo
- USS Vital, two US warships
- Vital currents, the concept of currents within the body found in Yoga
- Vital Forsikring, a Norwegian insurance company
- Vital organs, that are essential to an individual's life
- Vital signs, medical signs that indicate life-sustaining bodily functions
- Vital stain, a stain that can be applied on living cells without killing them
- Vital, a popular wavetable synthesizer by Matt Tytel

== See also ==
- Elan Vital (disambiguation)
- Montpellier vitalism, a French medical and philosophical school of thought
- Saint Vital (disambiguation)
- Saint Vitalis (disambiguation)
- Vital signs (disambiguation)
- Vitalism, the doctrine that life cannot be explained solely by mechanism
- Vitalism (Jainism), the Jain teacher Mahāvīra's philosophy
- Vitality, life, life force, health, youth, or ability to live or exist
- VITAL (disambiguation)
- Vittal (disambiguation)
