= Saint Vitalis =

Saint Vitalis may refer to:

== Italian saints ==
- Saint Vitalis of Milan (1st-2nd century), early Christian martyr
- Saint Vitalis, martyred in 250 under the persecution of Decius, whose feast date is January 9
- Saints Vitalis and Agricola (died 304), martyr at Bologna with Saint Agricola under Emperor Diocletian
- Saints Vitalis, Sator and Repositus, martyred in Apulia, possibly in the early 4th century
- Saint Vitalis (fl. 499), bishop of Fano
- Saint Vitalis of Castronovo (ca 900 - 994), Sicilian Griko hermit, abbot and monk from Castronovo, Sicily known for his miracles. He lived in Calabria and reposed at his monastery in Rapolla, Basilicata, South Italy
- Saint Vitalis of Assisi (1295–1370), Italian hermit and monk

== Other saints ==
- Saint Vitalis of Gaza (died 625), monk of Gaza
- Saint Vitalis of Salzburg (died 728), second bishop of Salzburg, feast day 20 October, see St. Rupert's Church, Vienna
- Saint Vitalis of Savigny (died 1122), founder of the Savigny Abbey and the Congregation of Savigny
- Saint Vidal (died 293), Complutense martyr

== Other uses ==
- Basilica of San Vitale (Rome)
- Basilica of San Vitale (Ravenna), a church in Ravenna, Italy
- San Vitale (Assisi)
- San Vidal, Venice, a former church

== See also ==
- Vitale
- Vital (disambiguation)
- Vitalis (disambiguation)
- Saint Vital (disambiguation)
