= Anupras Lauciūnas =

Lithuanian actor and director (born 1926)

- Born: 10 January 1926 (age 100); Panemunis, Rokiškis district, Lithuania
- Occupations: Actor, director
- Years active: 1949–1999

Anupras Lauciūnas (born 10 January 1926) is a Lithuanian former stage and film actor, and director of the first Lithuanian television broadcast along with Vitalis Gruodis.

== Biography ==
=== Early life and theatre career ===
Anupras Lauciūnas was born on 10 January 1926 in the town of Panemunis of the Rokiškis district in Lithuania. In 1944 Lauciūnas graduated from the Vilnius School of Fine Arts. In 1949 he graduated from the Lithuanian National Drama Theatre studio headed by Kazimiera Kymantaitė and began working as an actor in an official capacity for a total of ten years. Here he met fellow actors Vitalis Gruodis and Galina Dauguvietytė. Lauciūnas also studied at the Borisas Dauguvietis drama studio based in Vilnius.

Although Lauciūnas often played roles in children's plays, he also played parts in plays directed by Kazimiera Kymantaitė, Aleksandras Kernagis, Juozas Judzinskas, and Vitalis Gruodis. Lauciūnas underlined plays such as Konstantin Simonov's "Po Prahos kaštonais", Boris Gorbatov's "Tėvų jaunystė" and especially Antanas Vienuolis' "Paskenduolė", the latter being described by Lauciūnas, who acted as a priest, as the first time Lithuanians were exposed to a mass of operators, assistants, lights and filming machinery in Moscow. The performance in Moscow inspired Vitalis Gruodis to pursue a similar style of production at home, and he suggested they go to Riga for additional studies.

=== Television career ===
Vitalis Gruodis was made responsible for assembling a team that would prepare broadcasts. From 20 February 1957, Lauciūnas began working as Gruodis' assistant. In the summer of the same year, along with cameraman Jurgis Čepulis, Lauciūnas broadcast the first television broadcast in Lithuania from Šiauliai along with Vitalis Gruodis. Lauciūnas described working in the newly founded television studio as working "in a team of fire-fighters", due to the amount of pressure he received from being assigned difficult tasks. He further worked in various television editorials as senior director. In 1963 he acted in the film Beržai svyruokliai.

=== Later years ===
Lauciūnas acted in the 1993 TV show Giminės. Lauciūnas worked as the manager of the television directors' department from 1994. Lauciūnas also directed the TV show Nakviša. In 1996 Lauciūnas received the Auksinė bitė (Golden bee) award. He retired from television on 9 August 1999. In 2013 he acted in Laiškai Sofijai, a movie dedicated to Mikalojus Konstantinas Čiurlionis. In 2018 Lauciūnas received the Auksine bitė award for the second time.
