= John Vitale =

John Vitale may refer to:

- John Vitale (American football) (1965–2000), American gridiron football player
- John Vitale (mobster) (1909–1982), Sicilian-American organized crime figure

== See also ==
- Vitale (disambiguation)
