= Úrsula Vidal =

Ursula Vidal
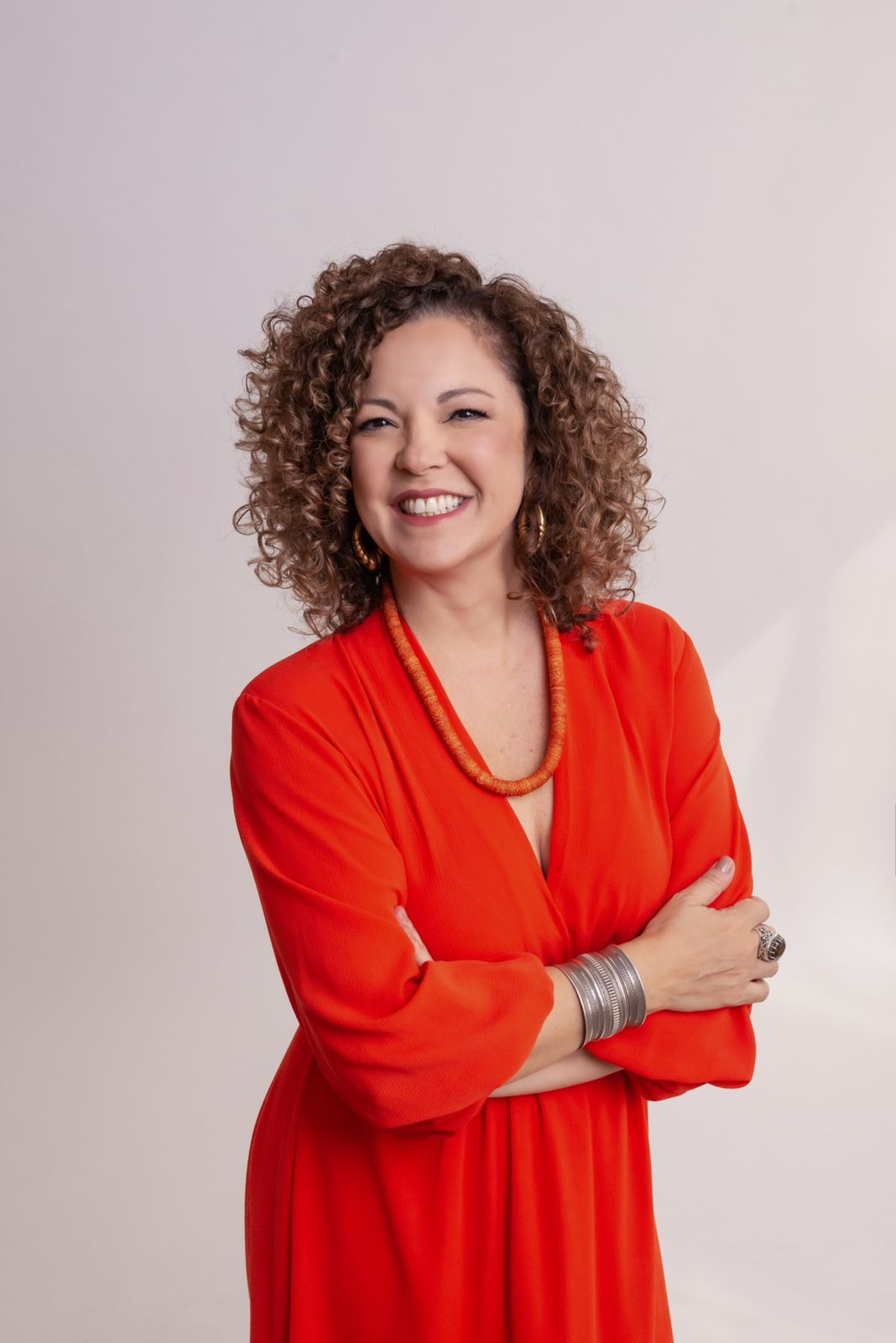

Secretária de Estado de Cultura do Pará

Personal details
- Born: Ursula Vidal Santiago de Mendonça; 26 January 1972 (age 54) Recife, Pernambuco, Brazil
- Party: PPS (2013-2015); REDE (2015-2018); PSOL (2018); PODE (2020-2021); REDE (2021-2022); MDB (2022-2024); UNIÃO (2024); MDB (2025-present)
- Occupation: journalist filmmaker

Ursula Vidal Santiago de Mendonça (born 26 January 1972) is a Brazilian journalist, filmmaker, and political activist affiliated with the MDB (Brazilian Democratic Movement). She is currently the Secretary of Culture for the state of Pará, having served as president of the Fórum Nacional de Secretários e Dirigentes de Cultura from 2019 to 2021.

== Early life and journalism ==
Vidal was born in Recife, Pernambuco, and moved to Belém do Pará when she was two. Her parents, João and Elisabeth, were activists in the resistance against the Brazilian military dictatorship.

When she was fifteen, Vidal began working as a radio presenter at Rádio Liberal FM and two other local radio stations, and at just seventeen, she had her first experience on television as a presenter for Jornal Cultura, on TV Cultura do Pará.

She studied journalism at Federal University of Pará (UFPA), and completed the course in Rio de Janeiro at Faculdade Hélio Alonso.

At university she took courses with filmmakers Eduardo Coutinho, João Moreira Salles and Walter Lima Jr., and in 1999 directed her first documentary, Marias e Josés de Nazaré, about the largest religious manifestation in Brazil, the Círio de Nazaré. As well as festivals, it was shown on television in Brazil and Portugal. In the same year, she received the Itaú Cultural Foundation award for the film A Caravana do Brega.

In 2000, Ursula Vidal returned to Belém and, in 2001, took over as presenter and editor of the daily show on SBT Pará, which she did for over a decade. She continued making films and, in 2004, directed the short film Aparência Nada +. In 2014, she co-directed the film Catadores de Sonhos with Homero Flávio.

In 2012, Vidal completed a postgraduate course in Sustainability at Fundação Dom Cabral, in Minas Gerais, and in 2015 she was ranked among the best Brazilian journalists, placing fifth among the ten most admired from the North Region.

== Political career ==
In 2014, Vidal was invited by Partido Popular Socialista (PPS), with support from Rede Sustentabilidade (REDE), to run for election as state deputy for Pará; though she received 5,653 votes, she was not elected. Two years later, in 2016, she ran for mayor of Belém with REDE and received 79,968 votes, coming fourth.

In 2018, then affiliated with Partido Socialismo e Liberdade (PSOL), Vidal ran for senator for Pará and received 585,344 votos. Unelected, Vidal accepted an offer from governor Helder Barbalho (MDB) to become Secretary of Culture for Pará (SECULT), a move that led her to disaffiliate from PSOL, as PSOL considered themselves opposition to the MDB government. During her time as culture secretary, she was elected president of the Fórum Nacional de Secretários e Dirigentes Estaduais de Cultura for 2019–2020.

On 1 April 2022, she resigned from her position as culture secretary to run for election again. She then joined the Brazilian Democratic Movement (MDB), Barbalho's party, and announced she would run for federal deputy.

== Election results ==
Year	Election	Party	Position	Votes	%	Result	Ref
2014	2014 Pará gubernatorial election	PPS	State Deputy	5.653	0,15%	Alternate	
2016	Municipality of Belém	REDE	Mayor	79.968	10,29%	Not elected	
2018	Pará State Elections	PSOL	Senator	585.344	8,35%	Not elected	
2022	Pará State Elections	MDB	Federal deputy	29.655	0,65%	Alternate	

== Bibliography ==
- "Ursula Vidal é eleita presidente do Fórum Nacional dos Secretários e Dirigentes Estaduais de Cultura". Bacana News. 2019.
- "Secretária Ursula Vidal e anuncia filiação ao Podemos". Diário Online. 2020.
- "Ursula Vidal 23013". Eleições 2014. 2014.
- "Candidata Ursula Vidal". Gazeta do Povo. 2018.
- "Rede lança Ursula Vidal como candidata à Prefeitura de Belém". G1 Globo. 2016.
- "Candidatos ao Senado pelo Pará nas eleições 2018: veja a lista". G1 Globo. 2018.
- "Helder Barbalho anuncia Úrsula Vidal como secretária de Cultura do Pará". G1 Globo. 2018.
- "Catadores de sonhos, documentário da vida dos catadores no lixão de Aurá, Belém". Greenme. 2016.
- "Os + admirados jornalistas brasileiros 2015". Maxpress. 2015.
- "Úrsula Vidal desiste de pré-candidatura". O Liberal. 2020.
- "Ursula Vidal é desfiliada do Psol: a jornalista deve assumir a Secretaria de Cultura na gestão Helder Barbalho". Roma News. 2018.
- "Ursula Vidal 18". Toda Política. 2016.
