= Marenostrum Music Festival =

Marenostrum MusicFestival
- Genre: electronic dance music
- Dates: July
- Locations: Valencia, Spain, SPA Spain
- Years active: 2014-present
- Attendance: 52,000

Marenostrum Music Festival is an electronic dance music festival held annually since 2014. The venue is July at Valencia, Spain. Headliners have included Hardwell, Dimitri Vegas & Like Mike, Afrojack, Nervo, Tiësto, Quintino, Mike Marin and Vitale .

== Recognition ==
Its first edition (2014) was nominated by Vicious Music Awards 2014 and Carlsberg as one of the three best festivals in Spain.

== See also ==
- List of electronic music festivals
