= Vitalis =

Vitalis may refer to:

== People ==
=== Given name ===
- Vitalis Azodo, Nigerian politician
- Vitalis Chikoko (born 1991), Zimbabwean professional basketball player
- Vitalis Danon (1897–1969), Sephardi writer
- Vitalis Gruodis (1921–2011), Lithuanian actor and director
- Vitalis Sekhonyana Marole (born 1954), Mosotho Roman Catholic prelate
- Vitalis Otia Suh (died 2024), Cameroonian actor and producer
- Vitalis Takawira (born 1972), Zimbabwean footballer
- Vitalis Zvinavashe (1943–2009), Zimbabwean military figure and politician

=== Surname ===
- Coraline Vitalis (born 1995), French fencer
- Danielle Vitalis, British actress
- Gobeom Sie Vitalis (born 1990), Liberian footballer
- Léon Vitalis (1890–1941), French flying ace
- Marie Vitalis (1890–1941), French flying ace
- Mark Vitalis (born 1968), West Indian cricketer
- Milán Vitális (born 2002), Hungarian soccer player
- Orderic Vitalis (1075–c. 1142), English chronicler and Benedictine monk
- Vangelis Vitalis (born 1969), New Zealand diplomat

=== Mononymous ===
- Saint Vitalis (disambiguation), various people
- Vitalis of Albano (active 1111–1126), cardinal-bishop
- Vitalis of Assisi (1295–1370), Italian hermit and monk
- Vitalis of Bernay (unknown–1085), Benedictine monk from Normandy
- Vitalis of Blois, 12th-century cleric and Latin dramatist
- Vitalis of Farfa (fl. 888), Italian abbot
- Vitalis of Gaza (unknown–c. 625), hermit and monk
- Vitalis of Milan (c. 1st century), Christian martyr and saint
- Vitalis of Savigny (c. 1060–1122), founder of Savigny Abbey in France
- Vitalis, Sator and Repositus (c. 4th century), Christian martyrs

== Other ==
- Keiferia vitalis, a moth in the family Gelechiidae
- Mare Vitalis, 2000 album by The Appleseed Cast
- St. Vitalis Church in Włocławek, in Poland
- Vitalis, a hair tonic formerly made by Bristol-Myers, now owned by Helen of Troy Limited

== See also ==
- Lumbricus terrestris, a type of worm in North America
- Vitali (disambiguation)
