= Vides =

Vides is a surname. Notable people with the surname include:

- Adolfo Méndez Vides (born 1956), Guatemalan writer
- Bruno Vides (born 1993), Argentine footballer
- Carlos Eugenio Vides Casanova (1937–2023), Salvadoran politician
- Jorge Vides (born 1992), Brazilian sprinter
