= Charles Watkins (legal writer) =

Welsh lawyer and legal writer

Charles Watkins (died 1808) was a Welsh lawyer and legal writer.

== Life ==
His father was the Rev. William Watkins of Llanvetherine, near Abergavenny, Monmouthshire. He practised from 1799 as a certificated conveyancer, until his death on 15 February 1808.

== Works ==
Watkins was author of:

- An Enquiry into the Title and Powers of His Majesty as Guardian of the Duchy of Cornwall during the late Minority of its Duke, n.d.
- An Essay towards the further Elucidation of the Law of Descents, 1793; 3rd edit. by Robert Studley Vidal, 1819; 4th edit. by Joshua Williams, 1837.
- Reflections on Government in general, with their Application to the British Constitution, 1796.
- Introduction (on the feudal system) to the fourth edition of Sir Geoffrey Gilbert's Law of Tenures, 1796.
- A Treatise on Copyholds, 1797–1799, 2 vols.; 3rd edit. by Vidal, 1821, 2 vols.; 4th edit. by Coventry, 1825.
- An Enquiry into the Question, whether the Brother of the Paternal Grandmother shall succeed to the Inheritance of the Son in preference to the Brother of the Paternal Great-grandmother, 1798.
- Principles of Conveyancing, designed for the Use of Students, 1800; 9th edit. by Henry Hopley White, 1845.

== Notes ==
Attribution

This article incorporates text from a publication now in the public domain: Lee, Sidney, ed. (1899). "Watkins, Charles (d.1808)". Dictionary of National Biography. Vol. 59. London: Smith, Elder & Co.
