= Joshua Williams (legal writer) =

English barrister and legal author

Joshua Williams (1813–1881) was an English barrister, with a reputation made as a legal author in the field of property law.

== Life ==
He was the fifth son and seventh child of Thomas Williams of Cote, Aston, Oxfordshire, born on 23 May 1813. He was educated at a private school, and afterwards at London University. At the age of 19 he was admitted a student of Lincoln's Inn on 31 January 1833. After practising for two or three years under the bar as a certificated conveyancer, he was called to the bar on 4 May 1838.

The publication of his books brought Williams an extensive practice as a conveyancer and real property lawyer, and in March 1862 he was appointed by Lord Westbury, the Lord Chancellor, one of the four conveyancing counsel to the court of chancery. His health suffered from the strain of increasing work. He was made a Queen's Counsel on 30 March 1865, and during Easter term, on 20 April following, was elected a bencher of Lincoln's Inn. As a Q.C. he became a series of cases relating to the establishment of rights of common; it included most of the cases in which there was an attempt by lords of manors to wrest from commoners the enjoyment of their rights.

In 1875 Williams was appointed professor of the law of real and personal property to the Inns of Court by the council of legal education, and was annually re-elected to this office until his resignation in 1880. He died at his residence, 49 Queensborough Terrace, London, on 25 October 1881.

== Works ==
In 1845 Williams published his Principles of the Law of Real Property (first as Williams on Conveyancing), a work which ran through 18 editions in the 19th century. It was followed in 1848 by his Principles of the Law of Personal Property, of which the 14th edition appeared in 1894.

Williams's lectures on the Seisin of the Freehold, the Law of Settlements, and the Rights of Common were published in 1878–1880. He also edited the fourth edition of Charles Watkins on Descents, and wrote Letters to John Bull, Esq., on Lawyers and Law Reform (London, 1857), and An Essay on Real Assets (1861).

== Family ==
Williams married four times. His son by the third wife, Thomas Cyprian Williams, a barrister, edited editions of his father's works from 1881.

== Notes ==
Attribution

This article incorporates text from a publication now in the public domain: Lee, Sidney, ed. (1900). "Williams, Joshua". Dictionary of National Biography. Vol. 61. London: Smith, Elder & Co.
