= Joshua Lorki =

Spanish-Jewish physician

Joshua ben Joseph ibn Vives al-Lorqui (of Lorca) (fl. 1400) was a Spanish-Jewish physician who lived at Alcañiz. In 1408, at the command of the rich and influential Benveniste ben Solomon ben Labi, he wrote a work in Arabic on the value and effects of various foodstuffs and of simple and composite medicaments. It was translated into Hebrew, under the title Gerem ha-Ma'alot, by Benveniste's son, Joseph Vidal.

This Joshua al-Lorqui is perhaps, as Philoxene Luzzatto points out, identical with the Joshua al-Lorqui who wrote an anti-Christian letter to his friend Solomon ha-Levi (Paul de Burgos), and who was also a physician in Alcañiz and was on friendly terms with Benveniste ben Labi, being present at Moses Benveniste's wedding. In the letter the writer expresses his astonishment at the fact that Paul de Burgos should have resolved to change his faith; he investigates the motives which could have led him to take such a step—ambition, mania for wealth and power, satisfaction of sensual desires, doubt of the truths of Judaism. He then gives eight arguments against the truth of Christianity, and in conclusion asks Paul if one who professes a certain religion is obliged to inquire into the truth of its doctrines.

This letter was addressed to Paul de Burgos at a time when the latter occupied a high position, was surrounded by luxury and a band of servants, and, as is supposed, had already been appointed tutor to the young king Juan II of Castile.

== Family ==
Joseph ben Joshua ibn Vives al-Lorqui, who died before 1372, was a physician. He revised Tibbon's translation of Moses Maimonides' Millot Higgayon and dedicated the revision to his pupil Ezra ben Solomon ibn Gatigno. He wrote also the Sefer Yesodot.

His son, also Joseph ben Joshua ibn Vives al-Lorqui, was also a physician, and died before 1408. He translated from Arabic into Hebrew various books of the short canon of Avicenna, and added to the translation a commentary which was used by ShemṬob Shaprut.
