= VITAL =

VITAL may refer to:

- Vitamin D and Omega-3 Trial, a 7 year clinical trial
- VHDL-VITAL, VHDL Initiative Towards ASIC Libraries
- VITAL (machine learning software)
- VITAL (asset management software), a software suite of digital asset management products by VTLS based on the open source Fedora architecture
- VITAL (ventilator), NASA ventilator developed during the COVID-19 pandemic

== See also ==
- Vital (disambiguation)
