= María-Esther Vidal =

Venezuelan professor

- Citizenship: Venezuelan and Spanish
- Education: Simón Bolívar University
- Scientific career
- Fields: Computer science

María-Esther Vidal Serodio is a Venezuelan professor at the computer science department of the Simón Bolívar University since 2005 and dean assistant for research and development in applied science and engineering since 2011, on-leave since 2015. She currently leads the Semantic Web Group, which includes members from multiple fields such as databases, distributed systems and artificial intelligence, and whose research is focused on the solving problems from said fields.

== Career ==
Esther Vidal graduated as a computer engineer from the Simón Bolívar University in 1987, with a master in computer science in 1991 and as a doctor in computer science in 2000. From 1995 to 1999 she was faculty research assistant of the Institute of Advanced Computer Studies (UMIACS) in the University of Maryland. In 2011 she became the director of direction for faculty development of the Simón Bolívar University. Since 1988 she has advised and mentored more than 80 students: 65 undergraduate, 10 master, and 7 PhD. As a PhD student, she worked with Louiqa Raschid from the University of Maryland, College Park.

In 2020, Esther Vidal was awarded in Germany with a honorific mention as one of the 50 most influential personalities of Computer Science Engineering in the last decade, as well as number four female researcher in the list. She is currently the director of the Scientist Data Management Group of the German National Library of Science and Technology and member of the L3S Research Centre of Leibniz University Hannover.

Esther Vidal has published more than 160 peer-reviewed papers in semantic web, databases, bioinformatics, and artificial intelligence, co-authored one monograph and co-edited books and journal special issues. She has addressed the challenges of creating knowledge graphs to support precision medicine; these techniques are being applied in projects like iASiS and BigMedylitics, and for over 15 years she has participated in international projects in collaboration with Louiqa Raschid from the University of Maryland, College Park. She is also part of various editorial boards and has been the general chair, co-chair, senior member, and reviewer of several scientific events and journals, a supervisor of MSCA-ETN projects WDAqua and NoBIAS, a visiting professor of universities such as Uni Maryland, KIT Karlsruhe.
