= Pidal =

Pidal is a surname. Notable people with the surname include:

- Juan Menéndez Pidal (1858–1915), Spanish archivist, jurisconsult, historian, and poet
- Luis Menéndez Pidal (1861–1932), Spanish genre painter, brother of Juan and Ramón Menéndez Pidal
- Luis Menéndez Pidal y Alvarez (1896–1975), Spanish architect, his son
- Pidal María Goyri de Menéndez (1873–1955), Spanish Hispanist, wife of Ramón Menéndez Pidal
- Ramón Menéndez Pidal (1869–1968), Spanish philologist and historian

== See also ==
- Vidal
