= Francisco Vidal Garcés =

Chilean lawyer, academic and politician (1878–1945)

Member of the Senate
- In office 15 May 1926 – 6 June 1932
- Constituency: 5th Provincial Grouping

Member of the Chamber of Deputies
- In office 15 May 1912 – 11 September 1924
- Constituency: Santa Cruz and Vichuquén
- In office 15 May 1891 – 15 May 1897
- Constituency: Curicó and Vichuquén

Personal details
- Born: 1878 Talca, Chile
- Died: 9 October 1945 (aged 66–67)
- Party: Conservative Party
- Spouse: Elena Vergara Ruiz
- Children: 9
- Occupation: Lawyer, academic, politician

Francisco Antonio Vidal Garcés (1878 in Talca, Chile – 9 October 1945) was a Chilean lawyer, academic and politician of the Conservative Party.

He served as a member of the Chamber of Deputies of Chile for seven legislative periods between 1891 and 1924, and later as a member of the Senate of Chile for the 5th Provincial Group (O'Higgins, Colchagua and Curicó) between 1926 and 1934.

== Early life and education ==
Vidal Garcés was born in Talca in 1878, the son of Francisco Antonio Vidal Rodríguez, a former deputy, and María Eugenia Garcés Silva. He completed his secondary education at the Seminario de Talca, where he consistently ranked among the top students. He later moved to Santiago to study law at the Catholic University of Chile, obtaining his law degree in 1901.

== Career ==
Following his graduation, Vidal Garcés pursued both academic and professional activities. He was appointed professor of Ancient, Greek and Roman history at the Instituto Católico de Humanidades, founded by the priest Luis Campino.

In 1906, he was appointed lawyer of the Municipality of Santiago, a position he held until 1912. During his tenure, he was notably involved in expropriation matters, acting with recognized professional diligence. After resigning to assume parliamentary duties, the municipality formally acknowledged his service.

He also served as second lawyer of the Canal de Maipo Society and was director of the Compañía Industrial El Volcán. Additionally, he was a member of the Club de la Unión and the National Society of Agriculture.

== Political career ==
A member of the Conservative Party, Vidal Garcés began his political career as an elector in the 1906 presidential election that brought Pedro Montt to office.

He was elected deputy for Curicó and Vichuquén for the period 1891–1894 and subsequently re-elected for multiple consecutive terms (1894–1897, 1912–1915, 1915–1918, 1918–1921, 1921–1924 and 1924–1927), completing seven legislative periods in the Chamber of Deputies of Chile. Throughout his tenure, he participated mainly in commissions related to Elections, Legislation and Justice, Government, and Education and Welfare. Between 1916 and 1917, he served as Second Vice President of the Chamber.

In 1926, he was elected senator for the 5th Provincial Group (O'Higgins, Colchagua and Curicó), serving until 1934. In the Senate, he was a member of the commissions on Constitution, Legislation, Justice and Regulation, and Labour and Social Welfare, and served as a substitute member of the Budget Commission.

== Personal life ==
He married Elena Vergara Ruiz, with whom he had nine children.
