= Faculdades Integradas Hélio Alonso =

University in Brazil

Hélio Alonso University or FACHA is a private university founded on December 6, 1971, in Rio de Janeiro, Brazil by professor Hélio Alonso (1929-2015). It has two campi: one located in Méier and one in Botafogo.
