= Joseph Vidal ibn Labi =

Spanish-Jewish scholar and orator

Joseph Vidal ibn Labi was a Spanish Jewish scholar and orator, son of the philosopher Solomon ibn Labi. He lived at Zaragoza, and was one of the 25 rabbis who by order of antipope Benedict XIII assisted at the disputation of Tortosa (February 7, 1413 – November 12, 1414), where he distinguished himself by his oratorical ability.

Labi translated into Hebrew, under the title Gerem ha-Ma'alot, a work on plants and their uses in medicine, written in Arabic by his tutor Joshua Lorki at the insistence of Solomon Benveniste (d. 1411), whose children Lorki was at the time educating (MS. Vienna No. 154). Of Labi's numerous other works only a few poems and letters dealing with literary matters are now extant.

== Jewish Encyclopedia bibliography ==
- Benjacob, Oẓar ha-Sefarim, p. 100;
- Fürst, Bibl. Jud. ii. 215;
- Krafft and Deutsch, Die Handschriftlichen Hebr. Werke der K. K. Hofbibliothek zu Wien, pp. 120 et seq., 164 et seq.;
- Steinschneider, Hebr. Bibl. xv. 56 et seq., 80 et seq.;
- idem, Cat. Munich, p. 138;
- Zunz, S. P. p. 520.
