= Catherine Vidal (actress) =

Quebec theater actress and director

- Born: November 11, 1976
- Education: Conservatoire d'art dramatique de Montréal
- Occupation: Actor, theatre director, singer, puppeteer, university teacher (2019–2023), stage actor, chief executive officer (2023–)
- Employer: Théâtre de Quat'Sous
- Awards: Prix de la critique (AQCT)

Catherine Vidal (born November 11, 1976) is a Quebec theater woman. Born to Chilean parents, she is an actress, puppeteer, singer and theatre director.

== Theatre ==
=== Directed ===
- 2008: Hypno de Simon Boudreault, mise en lecture, Festival du Jamais Lu
- 2008: Acné japonaise d'Étienne Lepage, Théâtre La Chapelle
- 2008: Walser, collage de textes de l’auteur Robert Walser
- 2009: Le Grand Cahier, Théâtre Prospero
- 2010: Joseph-la-tache, parcours ambulatoire Naissances du NTE à Espace Libre
- 2010: Amuleto, adaptation du roman du Chilien Roberto Bolaño, Théâtre de Quat'Sous
- 2012: Robin et Marion d'Étienne Lepage, Théâtre I.N.K.
- 2013: Des couteaux dans les poules de David Harrower
- 2014: Avant la retraite de Thomas Bernhard
- 2015: Le Cœur en hiver, adaptation d'Étienne Lepage, Théâtre de l'Oeil
- 2016: Le miel est plus doux que le sang, théâtre Denise-Pelletier
- 2018: L’Idiot, de Dostoïevski (adaptation d'Étienne Lepage), Théâtre du Nouveau Monde
- 2018: Chapitres de la chute, comise en scène avec Marc Beaupré, Théâtre de Quat'Sous
- 2017: Je disparais, Théâtre Prospero
- 2019 : Les amoureux, théâtre Denise-Pelletier

=== Acted ===
- 1999: Code 99, as Lune, salle Fred-Barry
- 2001: Les Parapluies de Cherbourg, as Madeleine
- 2002–2004: L’homme de la Mancha as Antonia
- 2004–2006: Frères de sang as Mary
- 2008: Lortie, at the Espace Libre in the chœur de trois femmes

== Honours ==
- 2013: Recipient of the Critics' Prize from the prix de la Critique de l'Association québécoise des critiques de théâtre in the Montreal category for Des 'couteaux dans les poules' by David Harrower.
- 2020: First winner of the Jovette-Marchessault Prize for recognizing and promoting the contribution of women artists in the Montreal theater community.
