= Vives =

Vives (Eastern Catalan: [ˈbiβəs]) is a surname of Catalan origin. It can refer to:

== People ==
- Amadeu Vives (1871–1932), Spanish musical composer
- Carlos Vives (born 1961), Colombian singer, composer and actor
- Carlota Durany Vives (1900–1945), Catalan communist activist
- Fernando Vives (1871–1935), Chilean Jesuit
- Gérard Vivès (born 1962), French actor and TV presenter
- Gilberto Calvillo Vives (born 1945), President of the National Institute of Statistics, Geography and Informatics (INEGI)
- Giuseppe Vives (born 1980), Italian football midfielder
- Juan Luis Vives (1493–1540), Valencian scholar and humanist
- Jaume Vicens i Vives (1910–1960), Spanish historian
- Josep Manyanet i Vives (1833–1901), Catalan priest who is venerated as a saint in the Roman Catholic Church
- Nuria Llagostera Vives (born 1980), Spanish female tennis player
- Peter Vives (born 1987), Spanish actor, singer and classical pianist
- Ricard Rubio Vives (born 1990), Spanish basketball player
- Salvador de Vives (1784–1845), mayor of Ponce, Puerto Rico 1840-42 and 1844-45
- T. Edward Vives, American trombonist and composer
- Xavier Vives (born 1955), Catalan economist

== Other uses ==
- Vives (album), by Carlos Vives (2017)
- Vivès, commune in the Pyrénées-Orientales department in southern France
- 11363 Vives, main belt asteroid
