= Vitali theorem =

Several theorems in mathematical analysis bear the name of Giuseppe Vitali:

- Vitali covering theorem in the foundations of measure theory
- Various theorems concerning convergence of families of measurable and holomorphic functions, such as Vitali convergence theorem
- Vitali also proved the existence of non-measurable subsets of the real numbers, see Vitali set
