= Claudina Vidal =

Uruguayan soccer player

Claudina Esther Vidal (24 December 1951) is the first woman to sign with a professional men's soccer team, in 1971 in Paysandu, Uruguay. Vidal signed with IASA Paysandú and played exhibition matches with them, but was never allowed to play an official match.

Vidal played center forward in the women's soccer league where she was called "the goalkeepers terror." She spent time practicing with IASA Paysandú because her cousin, Astur Vidal, coached the team. She tried out for the men's team in 1971. While some claimed she was put on the team as a gimmick, Astur Vidal said she had earned her spot on the roster. The team did request guidance from the Uruguayan Football Association which said there was no rule prohibiting her from joining. Local referees threatened to boycott any game in which Vidal, or any other woman, was playing.

Vidal became a minor media sensation after the BBC did a piece on her. Her age was reported as 19, 20 or 27 in North American media (it was 19), and her hair color was described alternately as brunette or blonde. The team traveled to Brazil to play an exhibition match and reported "more women in the stadium than men." Money they earned playing exhibition matches helped pay for their home field. The local referees association was against her playing and the local newspaper, El Telégrafo, refused to print the team's lineup.
