= Vitalii Demianiuk =

Vitalii Demianiuk Дем'янюк Віталій
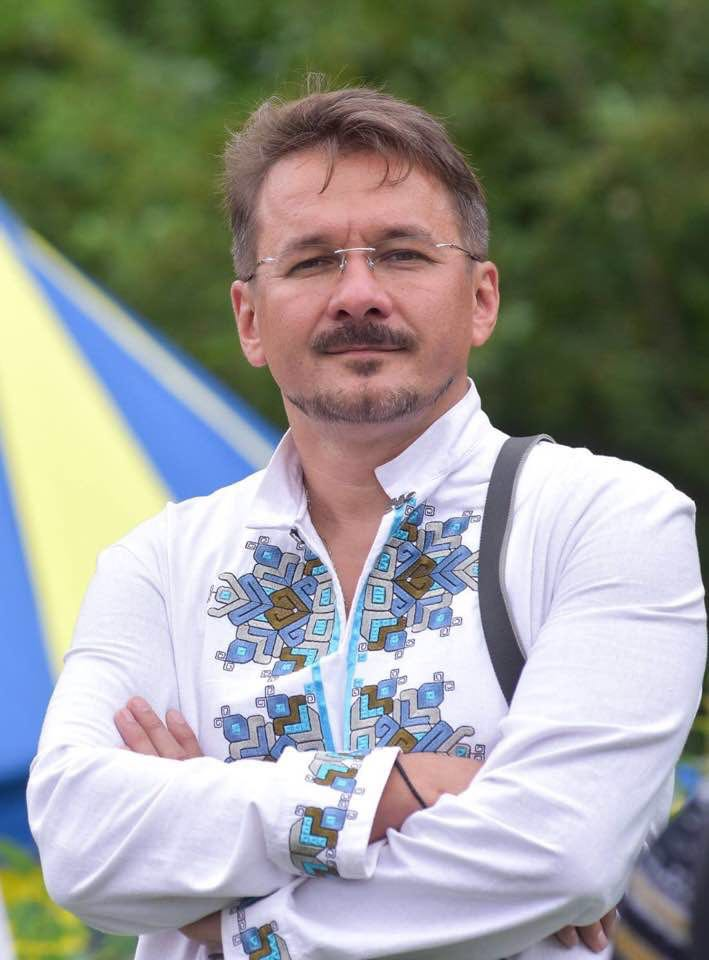
- Born: 26 December 1971 (age 54); Lviv, Ukraine
- Occupations: engineer; social activist
- Known for: Member of Supervisory Board Chornobyl Research and Development Institute

Vitalii Demianiuk (Ukrainian: Віталій Володимирович Дем'янюк; born 26 December 1971, Lviv, Ukraine) is a Ukrainian engineer, entrepreneur, public figure, and philanthropist.

== Biography ==
He was born in Lviv in the family of engineers and scientists. A lot of time in his childhood before secondary school he spent at homeland of his parents in the Rivne region.

=== Education ===
- 1979–1989 – Lviv secondary school №80, which he graduated with honors.
- He graduated from the Faculty of Theoretical and Experimental Physics of the Moscow Engineering Physics Institute and the Faculty of Law of Lomonosov Moscow State University.
- He received a master's degree in public development management from the National Academy for Public Administration under the President of Ukraine. Also Demianiuk received a master's degree in oil and gas management at Graduate Institute of International and Development Studies in Geneva, Switzerland.
- He speaks five languages: Ukrainian – native, English, Russian, French and Polish.

=== Career ===
- 1995–1996 – legal adviser of the department for work in the stock market of a commercial bank.
- 1996–1997 – Executive Director of the pharmaceutical company.
- 1997–1998 – after an internship at Chase Manhattan Bank (New York, United States), he worked as a specialist in the development and approval of new investment products for the new markets department of J.P.Morgan Bank (London, United Kingdom).
- 1998–2006 – Demianiuk worked as deputy general director of the coal association "Krasnoyarsk Coal Company", served as a member of the board of directors of the power generating company Novosibirskenergo, also was deputy general director of the RU-COM group of companies (power and machine building holding).
- March 2006 – August 2006 – Advisor to the Minister of Construction, Architecture, and Communal Living of Ukraine.
- September 2006 – June 2010 – General Director of GAZEKS-Ukraine – a group of regional gas distribution companies (Kharkivgaz, Kharkivmyskgaz, Donetskkimskgaz, Dniprogaz, Krivorizhgaz).
- July 2010 – October 2011 – Deputy Chairman of the State Agency for Management of National Projects of Ukraine and Deputy Chairman of the State Agency for Investments and National Projects of Ukraine.
- October 2011 – January 2013 – Partner-adviser in the energy sector Conlan&Associates, Chairman of the Coordinating Council of the National Project "LNG-Terminal" (on a voluntary basis).
- February 2013 – February 2014 – Director of Programs on Energy Diversification and Energy Efficiency of the International CSO "International Centre for Policy Studies".
- In March 2014, Vitalii Demianiuk became the head of the supervisory board of NT-Engineering and concentrated on entrepreneurial and social activities. The main areas of business were industrial and energy engineering, alternative energy, behavior with radioactive waste, nuclear and radiation safety.
- In August 2014, Vitalii Demianiuk participated and won in an open tender held by the Cabinet of Ministers of Ukraine for the post of Deputy Minister of Ecology and Natural Resources of Ukraine on European integration issues. The appointment does not take place because of the change of Cabinet of Ministers of Ukraine after the parliamentary elections in October 2014. In connection with the victory in the contest, special control about Vitalii Demianiuk was conducted. According to it, facts which could prevent him from holding a post, related to the execution of state functions, was not found as of October 20, 2014. This fact is evidenced by an official letter of the Minister of the Government of Ukraine of January 23, 2015.

=== Political activity ===
In October 2014 Vitalii Demianiuk became a candidate for People's Deputies of Ukraine at the snap parliamentary elections on 26 October 2014 in electoral district number 154 (Demydivka Raion, Dubno Raion, Zdolbuniv Raion, Mlyniv Raion and Radyvyliv Raion of the Rivne Oblast of Ukraine). He was nominated as a candidate by the All-Ukrainian Union "Svoboda". Demianiuk received 10.47% of the vote and took 3rd place out of 17 candidates.

=== Social activity ===
In January 2015, Vitalii Demianiuk initiated the creation of a think-tank, whose main goal was making quality proposals for the development of the Chernobyl Exclusion Zone. This assignment grew into the creation of a non-governmental non-profit organization "Chornobyl Research and Development Institute". Since March 2016, Vitalii Demianiuk is a member of Supervisory Board of Chornobyl Research and Development Institute.

He initiated the rebranding program of Chernobyl Exclusion Zone "Chornobyl is the Territory of Change". He supports the complex rehabilitation and development of Chernobyl Exclusion Zone, creating opportunities for its industrial development, expanding scientific and technological research within the exclusion zone, developing alternative energy and forming a biosphere reserve in parts of its territories. Demianiuk engaged in nuclear and radiation safety issues.

Since February 2017 Vitalii Demianiuk has headed the Public Council under the State agency of Ukraine on Exclusion Zone Management.

=== Cultural and historical projects ===
Vitalii Demianiuk since 2008 is an invariable patron of the festival of medieval Ukrainian culture "Tu Stan!".

In 2007, he became one of the patrons who supported the first edition of the book by Volodymyr Viatrovych, Ruslan Zabiliy, Igor Derevianskiy and Petro Sodol "Ukrainian Insurgent Army. The history of the unconquered".

In 2008, he became one of the patrons of printing of the facsimile edition of Peresopnytsia Gospel, which was issued by the publishing house "ADEF-Ukraine".
