= Adolfo Méndez Vides =

Guatemalan writer (born 1956)

- Born: Gilberto Adolfo Méndez Vides; 1956 (age 69–70); Antigua Guatemala, Sacatepéquez Department, Guatemala
- Occupations: Writer, poet, cultural journalist, literary columnist
- Writing career
- Language: Spanish
- Notable works: Las catacumbas; Las murallas
- Notable awards: Miguel Ángel Asturias National Prize in Literature (2025)

Gilberto Adolfo Méndez Vides (born 1956), known professionally as Adolfo Méndez Vides or Méndez Vides, is a Guatemalan writer, poet, cultural journalist and literary columnist. Born in Antigua Guatemala, he is associated with contemporary Guatemalan literature and has written novels, short stories, poetry, essays and literary journalism.

Méndez Vides won the Premio Latinoamericano de Novela Nueva Nicaragua in 1986 for Las catacumbas and the Premio de Novela Mario Monteforte Toledo in 1997 for Las murallas. In 2025 he was named recipient of Guatemala's Miguel Ángel Asturias National Prize in Literature.

== Life and career ==
Méndez Vides was born in 1956 in Antigua Guatemala, in the department of Sacatepéquez. He grew up in Antigua Guatemala and later maintained ties with both that city and Guatemala City.

His first book published through an editorial project was the short-story collection Escritores famosos y otros desgraciados, issued by Rin-78. In a 2026 profile, eP Investiga reported that Max Araujo, who was involved with that publishing project, regarded the book as the definitive beginning of Méndez Vides's literary career.

Méndez Vides's novel Las catacumbas won the Premio Latinoamericano de Novela Nueva Nicaragua in 1986 and was first published in 1987. Literary scholar Claudia García described the novel as a work set in Mazatenango in the mid-1960s and argued that it occupied a position close to, but distinct from, both the "new Guatemalan novel" and postwar Central American narrative.

His novel Las murallas won the Premio de Novela Mario Monteforte Toledo in 1997. Prensa Libre reported in 2014 that the book, which follows two Guatemalans in New York, had been reissued in a second edition.

Méndez Vides has also worked as a literary columnist and cultural journalist. In an interview with Agencia Ocote, he said that he began publishing columns and articles in El Imparcial around 1978 and later wrote two weekly columns for elPeriódico for 26 years. As part of the 2025 national literature prize, a selection of his literary essays was announced for publication under the title Viaje al centro de los libros, the same title he had used for his column in elPeriódico.

== Literary work and criticism ==
Méndez Vides has published fiction, poetry and essays. García identifies him as a Guatemalan narrator, poet and cultural journalist, and lists among his works Las murallas, El leproso and the short-story collection El tercer patio.

In her study of Las catacumbas, García reads the novel as a critical treatment of the everyday life of popular classes in Guatemala, with attention to enclosure, political apathy, precarious work and gendered violence. She also argues that the novel uses intertextual connections with Antonio José de Irisarri's El cristiano errante and Guillermo Cabrera Infante's Tres tristes tigres to connect the book with traditions of satire, social criticism and the novel of manners.

== Awards and recognition ==
Méndez Vides received the Premio Latinoamericano de Novela Nueva Nicaragua in 1986 for Las catacumbas. He won the Premio de Novela Mario Monteforte Toledo in 1997 for Las murallas. In 2001, the Municipality of Antigua Guatemala awarded him the Orden Rafael Landívar, and in 2007 the Municipality of Guatemala dedicated its book fair to him. In 2002, his work La dama Villanova won the short-story category at the LXV Juegos Florales Hispanoamericanos de Quetzaltenango. In January 2026, Prensa Libre reported that Méndez Vides had been named the recipient of the 2025 edition of the Miguel Ángel Asturias National Prize in Literature. The award was presented to him in February 2026 at the Palacio Nacional de la Cultura in Guatemala City.

== Selected works ==
- Escritores famosos y otros desgraciados — short stories.
- Las catacumbas — novel; first published in 1987 and reissued in 2001.
- Las murallas — novel.
- El tercer patio — short stories.
- El leproso — novel.
