= Vidal Alcocer =

Mexican philanthropist (1801-1860)

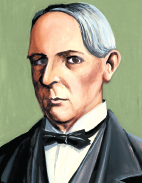
- Born: April 28, 1801; Mexico City
- Died: November 22, 1860 (aged 59); Mexico City
- Occupation: Philanthropist

Vidal Alcocer (April 28, 1801 – November 22, 1860) was a Mexican philanthropist.

Vidal Alcocer was born on April 8, 1801 in Mexico City. When very young he worked as a bookbinder, and then as a gunsmith, until he entered the army. He fought in the war of independence, at the end of which he retired, but afterward took part in organizing of troops for the war against the French, and then as a soldier in operations to defend his native city from the American army. His chief aim in life was to promote education among destitute children, in pursuit of which he organized, in 1846, an association which, in August 1853, had established twenty schools for poor children in the city of Mexico, and from 1854 to 1858 the number of these schools was increased to thirty-three, with 7,000 boys and girls receiving a good elementary education. Vidal Alcocer died on 22 November 1860 in Mexico City.
