= Vidali =

Vidali is a surname. Notable people with the surname include:

- Lynn Vidali (born 1952), American swimmer
- Vittorio Vidali (1900–1983), Italian communist and Soviet Spy

== See also ==
- Vidale
