= Louiqa Raschid =

Sri Lankan / American computer and data scientist

- Born: 1958 (age 67–68); Colombo, Sri Lanka
- Citizenship: American
- Education: University of Florida, Ph.D. Indian Institute of Technology Madras, B. Tech
- Known for: data integration data science
- Scientific career
- Fields: Electrical Engineering Computer Science Data Science
- Thesis: (1987)
- Doctoral advisor: Stanley Y.W. Su

Louiqa Raschid (born March 17, 1958, in Sri Lanka) is a computer scientist in the USA who specializes in data base management and data science with applications in biology, medicine, financial and socio-economic data and disaster management. She is a professor in the Robert H. Smith School of Business and UMIACS at the University of Maryland, College Park.

== Education and career ==
Raschid attended Bishop's College and St. Bridget's Convent in Sri Lanka, and won first place among all Sri Lankans in the 1973 General Certificate of Education, before moving to India for her university education. She earned a bachelor's degree in 1980 from the Indian Institute of Technology Madras, and completed her Ph.D. in electrical engineering in 1987 at the University of Florida.

She joined the Robert H. Smith School of Business as an assistant professor in 1987, and was promoted to full professor there in 2002. She has also been affiliated with the computer science department at the University of Maryland since 1994.

She served as editor-in-chief of the ACM Journal of Data and Information Quality from 2013 to 2017.

== Recognition ==
Raschid was named an ACM Fellow in 2016 "for data management and integration in non-traditional domains including biomedicine, finance, and humanitarian applications". She was recognized as an IEEE Fellow in 2021.
