= Vital signs (disambiguation) =

Vital signs are basic measures of life and good health frequently examined in medicine.

Vital signs may also refer to:

== Music ==
- Vital Signs (band), a pop band from Pakistan
- Vital Signs (Survivor album), 1984
- Vital Signs (White Heart album), 1984
- "Vital Signs" (Rush song), 1981
- "Vital Signs" (Frank Turner song), 2006
- "Vital Signs", a song on the album The Crystal Axis by the Midnight Juggernauts

== Other uses in arts, entertainment, and media ==
- Vital Signs (1990 film), an American film directed by Marisa Silver
- Vital Signs (2009 film), a Canadian film directed by Sophie Deraspe
- Vital Signs (novel), a 1991 novel by Robin Cook
- Vital Signs (TV series), a British television show
