= Vital (given name) =

Vital is the name of:

- Vital Ahačič (1933–1995), Slovenian accordionist and pedagogue
- Vital Alsar (born 1933), sailor
- Vital Aza (1851–1912), Spanish author, playwright, poet, and satirist
- Vital Balla, Congolese politician
- Vital Borkelmans (born 1963), Belgian footballer
- Vital Brazil (1865–1950), Brazilian physician, biomedical scientist, and immunologist
- Vital Bułyha (born 1980), former footballer
- Vital Cliche (1890–1976), Canadian politician
- Vital Cuinet (1833–1896), French geographer and orientalist
- Vital de Mortain, founder of Savigny Abbey
- Vital Dejkała (born 1984), retired Belarusian professional footballer
- Vital Eiselt (born 1941), Slovenian basketballer
- Vital Hajdučyk (born 1989), Belarusian professional footballer
- Vital Hébert (died 1867), landowner and political figure in New Brunswick
- Vital Heynen (born 1969), former Belgian volleyballer
- Vital Joachim Chamorin (1773–1811), French general officer
- Vital Kamerhe (born 1959), Congolese politician
- Vital Kibuk (born 1989), Belarusian professional footballer
- Vital Kramko (born 1941), chairman of "October" (Октябрь), an agricultural collective
- Vital Lahaye (born 1937), Belgian writer and teacher
- Vital Ledzianioŭ (born 1979), retired Belarusian professional footballer
- Vital Łańko (born 1977), professional Belarusian footballer
- Vital Makaŭčyk (born 1981), retired Belarusian professional footballer
- Vital N'Simba (born 1993), Angolan-born DR Congolese footballer
- Vital Nadzijeŭski (born 1981), retired Belarusian professional footballer
- Vital Panasiuk (born 1980), Belarusian professional footballer
- Vital Rahožkin (born 1976), retired Belarusian professional footballer
- Vital Roux (1766–1846), French businessman
- Vital Rymašeŭski (born 1975), Belarusian politician
- Vital Soares (1874–1933), Brazilian lawyer and politician
- Vital Šapiatoŭski (born 1983), Belarusian professional footballer
- Vital Taraščyk (born 1980), retired Belarusian professional footballer
- Vital Têtu (1799–1883), political figure in Lower Canada
- Vital Vaładziankoŭ (born 1976), retired Belarusian professional footballer
- Vital Voranau (born 1983), Polish-Belarusian, writer, playwright, poet and translator
- Vital Miranda Whitford, founder of Asociación de Scouts de Nicaragua

== See also ==
- Saint Vital (disambiguation)
- Vital (disambiguation)
