= Eugène Vincent Vidal =

French painter (1850–1908)

Eugène Vincent Vidal (1850–1908) was a French painter of portraits and genre scenes.

== Life ==
Eugène Vincent Vidal was born in Paris in 1850. He was a pupil of Jean-Léon Gérôme, and exhibited at the Paris Salon for the first time in 1873. He used thick layers of paint to depict Algerian street scenes in the Orientalist style. He died in Cagnes-sur-Mer in 1908.

== Gallery ==
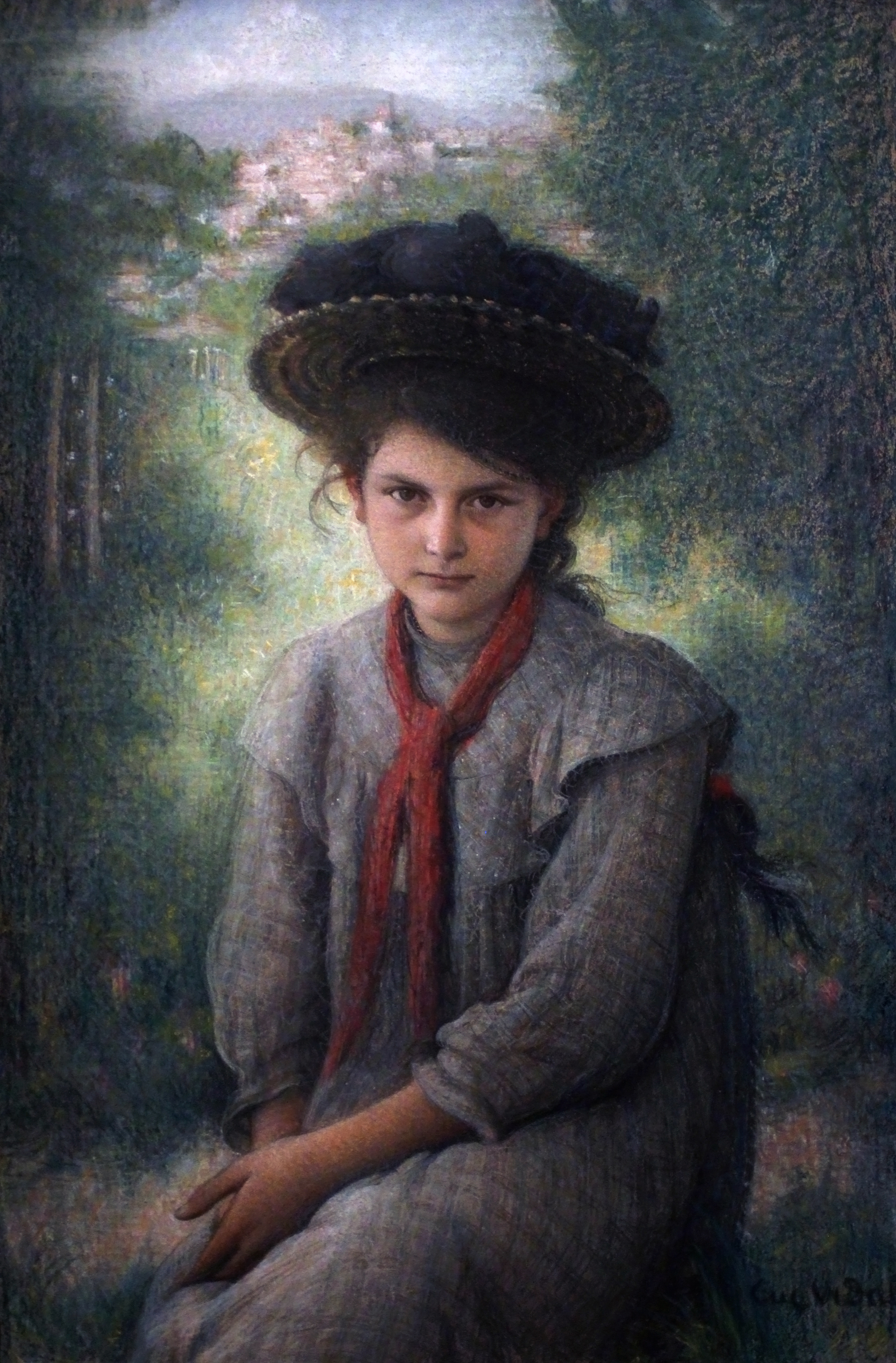
Ernestine (portrait)

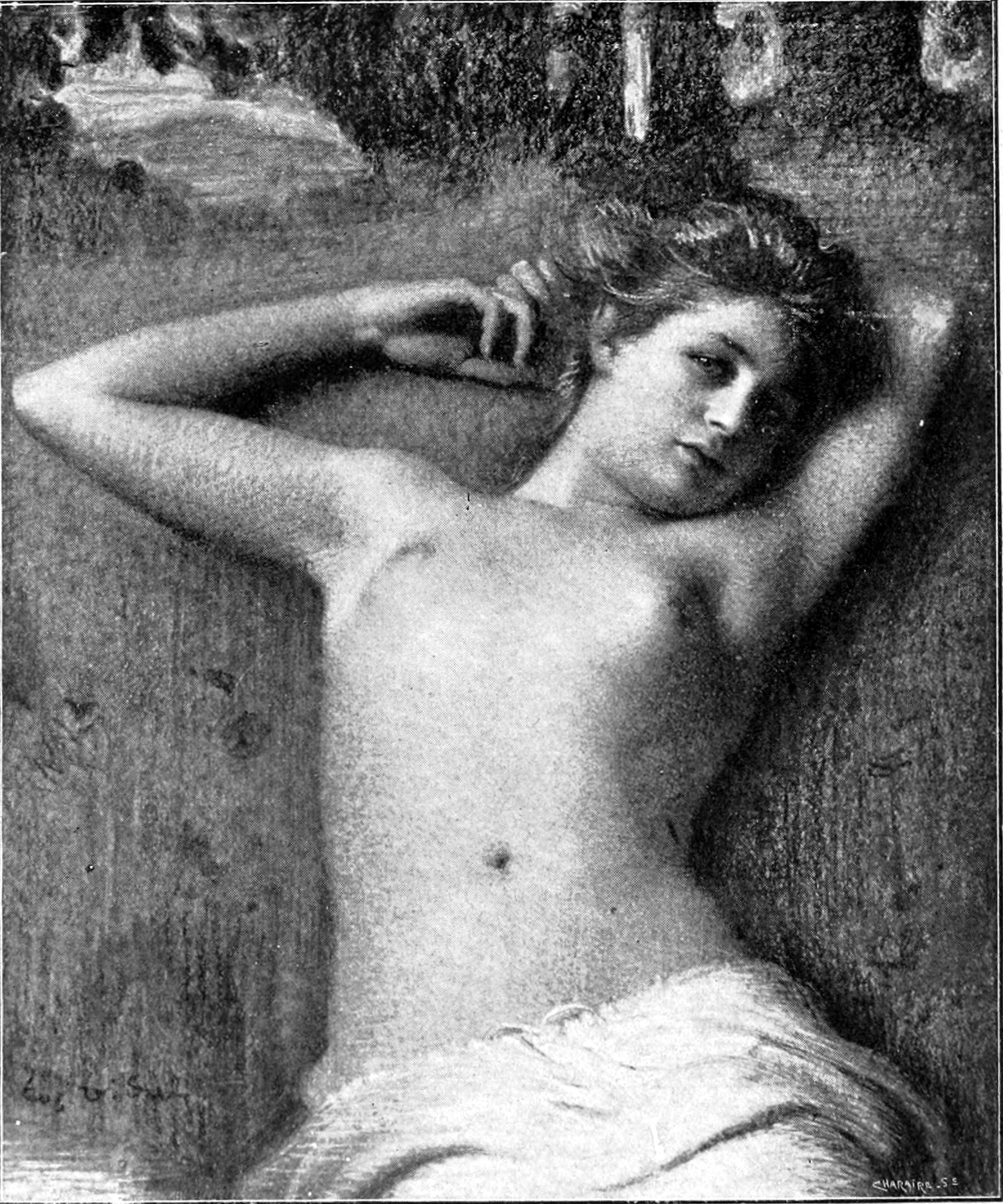
Repos

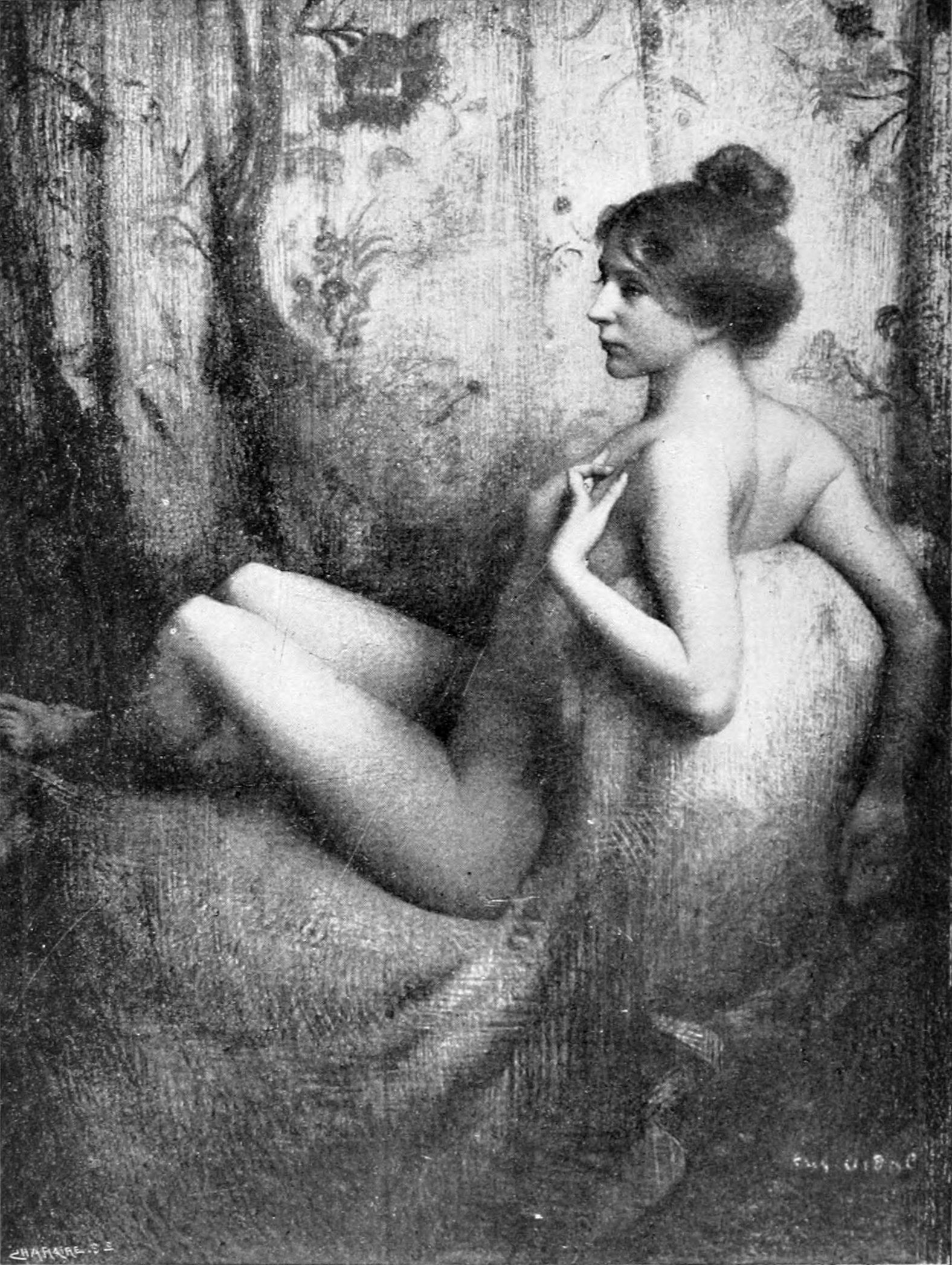
Nu

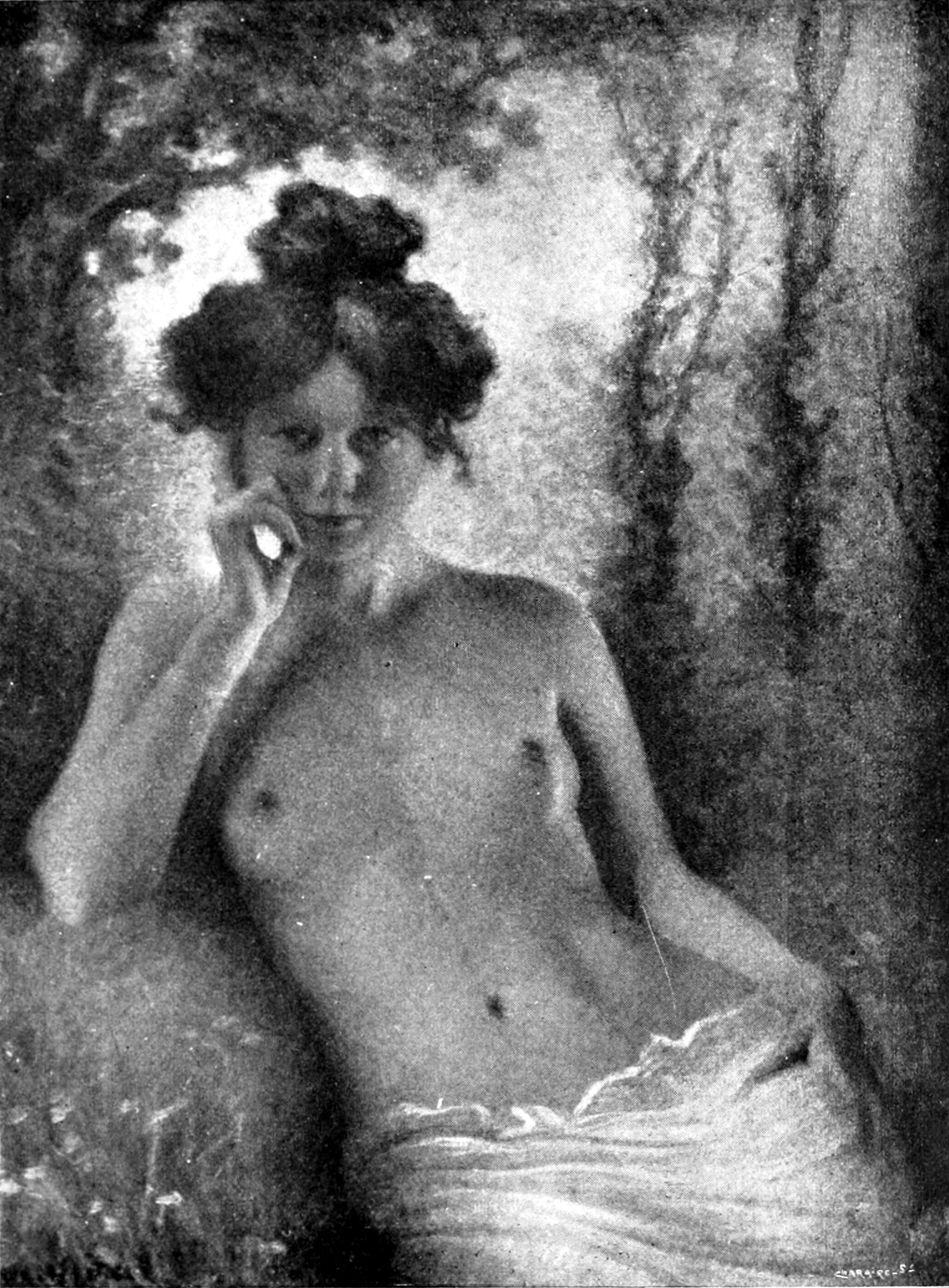
Femme nue

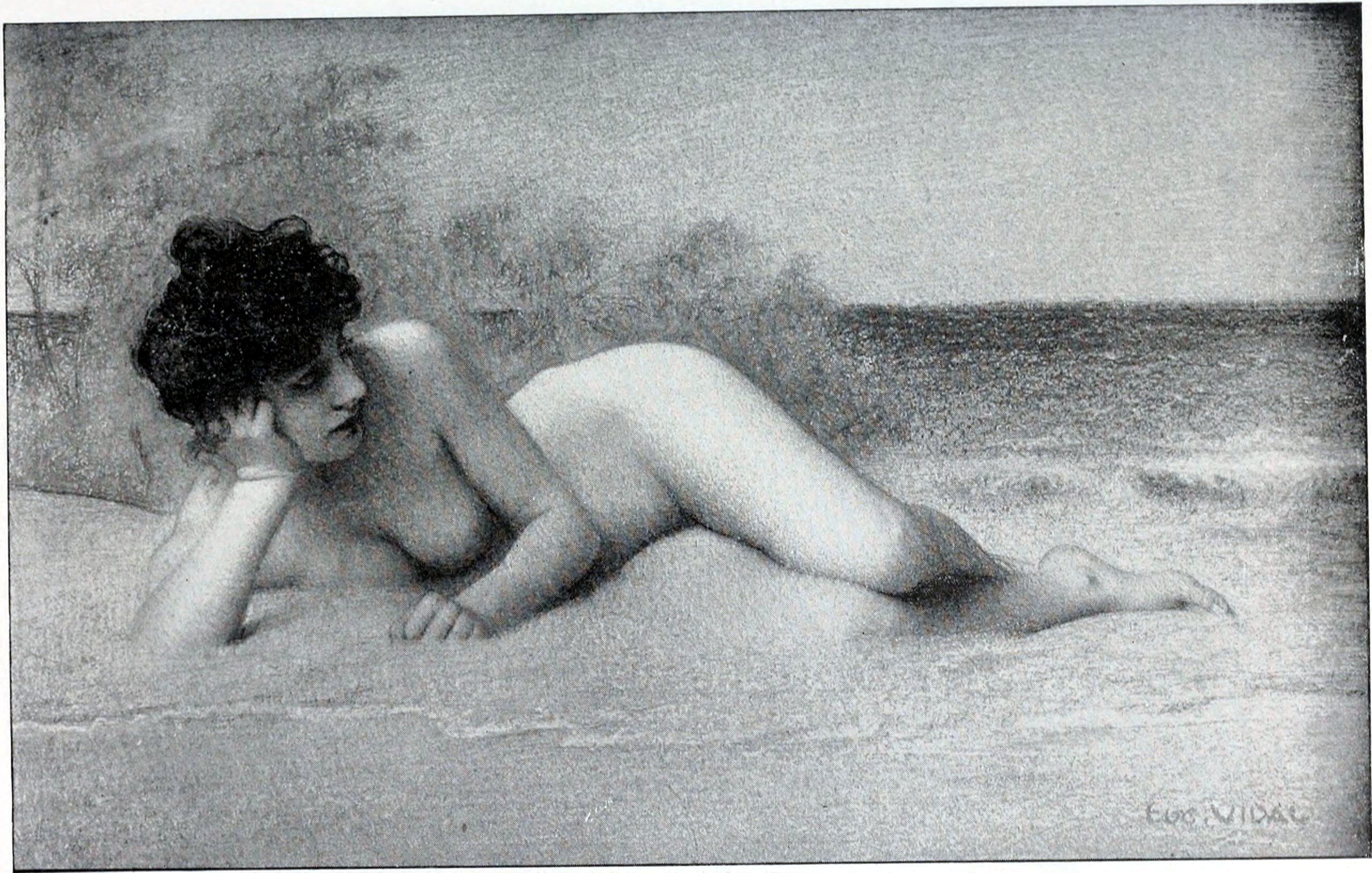
Femme nue (pastel)

== Sources ==
- Bénézit, Emmanuel (1924). «Vidal (Eugène)». Dictionnaire critique et documentaire des peintres, sculpteurs, dessinateurs & graveurs de tous les temps et de tous les pays. Vol. 3. Paris: Ernest Gründ. p. 995.
- Beyer, Andreas; Savoy, Bénédicte; Tegethoff, Wolf, eds. (2021). "Vidal, Eugene Vincent". Allgemeines Künstlerlexikon - International Artist Database - Online. Berlin, New York: K. G. Saur. Retrieved 7 October 2022 – via De Gruyter.
- "Vidal, Eugène Vincent". Benezit Dictionary of Artists. 2011. Oxford University Press. Retrieved 7 October 2022 – via Oxford Art Online.
