= Panemunis =

- Town
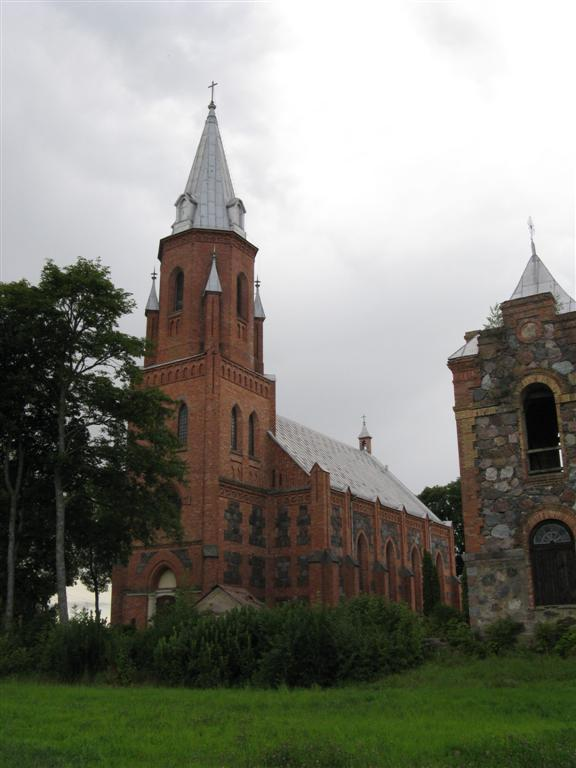

- Location within Lithuania
- Coordinates: 56°03′40″N 25°16′40″E
- Country: Lithuania
- County: Panevėžys County

Population (2011)
  - Total: 231
- Time zone: UTC+2 (EET)
  - Summer (DST): UTC+3 (EEST)

Panemunis (Polish: Poniemuń) is a small town in Panevėžys County, in northeastern Lithuania. According to the 2011 census, the town has a population of 231 people.
