= Vitalis Gruodis =

- Born: 24 March 1921; Tolovka, Samara Oblast, Soviet Union
- Died: 30 December 2011 (aged 90); Vilnius, Lithuania
- Occupation(s): Actor, director
- Years active: 1941–1990

Vitalis Gruodis (24 March 1921 – 30 December 2011) was a Lithuanian theater actor and director of the first Lithuanian television broadcast. He is the father of director Rimantas Gruodis. Gruodis is responsible for creating around thirty documentaries, as well as a multitude of Soviet-era Lithuanian films and plays for children.

== Biography ==
Vitalis Gruodis was born on 24 March 1921 in the village of Tolovka in the Samara Oblast of Russia. Gruodis' grandparents were deported to Russia because of their participation in the 1863 January Uprising. In 1922, Gruodis and his parents returned to Lithuania, were provided with land, and worked as farmers in the Rokiškis District Municipality.

From 1939 to 1941, he attended the Šiauliai State Drama Theater, and upon graduating in 1941, began work as an actor and director. From 1947 to 1954, Gruodis switched to acting and directing in the Lithuanian National Drama Theatre in Vilnius. From 1947 to 1949, Gruodis was the director of the Lithuanian SSR Writers' Union Literature Foundation. From 1949 to 1951, he was the director of the Lietuva Dance Ensemble, the only professional ensemble of dancers and players of traditional instruments in the Baltic States.

In 1954, Gruodis was appointed as the director of the Lithuanian Committee for Radio and Television. In 1957, along with fellow actor and friend Anupras Lauciūnas, Gruodis became responsible for directing and launching the first national broadcast on television. In 1957, Gruodis was the director of the first television-broadcast play in Lithuania O vis dėl to ji sukasi. From 1967 to 1970, Gruodis worked as director of the Lithuanian Film Studios. In 1983, Groudis moved to Ulanbataar to direct radio and television programs. He retired from his position in 1990. From 1997 to 2008, Gruodis acted in a total of five films.

Vitalis Gruodis died on 30 December 2011 in Vilnius.

== Notable works ==
- Raudonkepuraitė (Little Red Riding Hood), 1952, children's play
- Princas ir elgeta (The Prince and the Beggar), 1953, children's play
- Posūkis (The Turn), 1967 (secondary director)
- Kai aš mažas buvau (When I Was Little), 1968 (secondary director)
- Birželis, vasaros pradžia (June, the Beginning of Summer), 1969 (secondary director)
- Trečiojo grūdo likimas (The Fate of the Third Grain), 1971
- Bendraamžiai (Contemporaries), 1973
- Aš, Vytautas Alseika (I, Vytautas Alseika), 1973
- Vėtrungėm paženklinti (To Mark the Weather Vanes), 1975
- Kaltinami žmogžudyste (Accused of Murder), 1977
- Karlagas – mirties žemė (Karlag – the Land of Death), 1990
