= Vidale =

Vidale is a surname. Notable people with the surname include:

- Fabrizio Vidale (born 1970), Italian actor
- John Vidale (born 1959), American seismologist
- Thea Vidale (born 1956), American comedian and actress

== See also ==
- Vidales
- Vidali
- Vitale
