= Xiomara Vidal =

Cuban trovadora (born 1955)

Xiomara Vidal (born 1955 in Santiago de Cuba) is a Cuban trovadora. She has over 30 years experience as a composer and performer of traditional Cuban music. She took her first steps in Santiago de Cuba's Cabildo Theatrical School along with many other actors of national renown. She is a resident performer at the Casa de la Trova and the Casa del Queso on Calle Heredia. She is a regular participant at Santiago de Cuba's annual International Trova Festival, commemorating Pepe Sánchez (trova), and many other music events.

She has written over 35 compositions, many of them boleros in the Nueva Trova style, and her music has appeared in several films, American and Italian television and French radio.
