= Rocío Vidal =

Spanish cartoonist and illustrator

- Born: 6 March 1989 (age 37) Barcelona, Spain
- Areas: Cartoonist, illustrator
- Notable works: Machistadas

Rocío Vidal Chica (born 6 March 1989) is a Spanish cartoonist and illustrator, organizer of the KBOOM! independent comic conference and former collaborator of the satirical magazine El Jueves. She is known for her graphic novel Machistadas.

== Career ==
Rocío Vidal has a degree in Fine Arts from the University of Barcelona. From a very early age she began to be interested in comics and at the age of 14 she began publishing fanzines and self-published works.

As the years went by, Vidal delved more professionally into the comics industry, delving into it in various ways: working as an author, being part of the editorial board of the independent comic anthology Sextories and serving as a regular contributor to the magazine satirical El Jueves, a position she held until her dismissal in 2023.

In February 2019, Vidal launched her work Machistadas, together with the Plan B publishing house, a graphic novel that vindicates the situations of machismo and micromachismo that men and women face in today's society.

== Works ==
- El cuaderno de Tesla (with Evandro Rubert, 2009 to 2011)
- Doctor Wargh! (Antología, 2012)
- Sextories Fanzine #1-3 (Anthology, 2012-?)
- Pandora's Box #13 (Anthology, 2013)
- Colección Vendimia #5 (2015)
- Con los Ojos de un Niño (Anthology, 2016)
- Promiscua (2017)
- El Jueves #2145 (Anthology, 2018)
- Sextories - Historias con chicha #1-3 (Anthology, 2018–2019)
- Machistadas (2019)
- El Jueves #2231 (Anthology, 2020)
