= Robert Studley Vidal =

Robert Studley Vidal (1770–1841) was an English barrister, known as a translator, legal writer and antiquary.

== Life ==
The son of Robert Studley Vidal, a solicitor in London who died at Exeter on 2 January 1796, he was called to the bar at the Middle Temple. He kept a pack of harriers at Cornborough, near Bideford, Devon, where he died on 21 November 1841.

== Legacy ==
Vidal formed a collection of coins and medals, which was sold by Leigh & Sotheby in 1842 after his death. By his will he founded two scholarships at St. John's College, Cambridge, charged on his manor of Abbotsham.

== Works ==
Vidal's major work was the translation of Johann Lorenz Mosheim's Commentaries on the Affairs of the Christians before the Time of Constantine, vols. i. and ii. 1813, vol. iii. 1835. He had antiquarian tastes, and communicated papers on trial by ordeal and on the site of Kenwith Castle, Devonshire, to the Society of Antiquaries of London, through his friend Henry Wansey. He prepared the third edition of A Treatise on Copyholds (London, 1821, 2 vols.) by Charles Watkins, and the fifth edition of the work on Tenures (London, 1824) of Sir Geoffrey Gilbert.

== Notes ==
Attribution

This article incorporates text from a publication now in the public domain: Lee, Sidney, ed. (1899). "Vidal, Robert Studley". Dictionary of National Biography. Vol. 58. London: Smith, Elder & Co.
