= 2014 Pará gubernatorial election =

- October 5, 2014
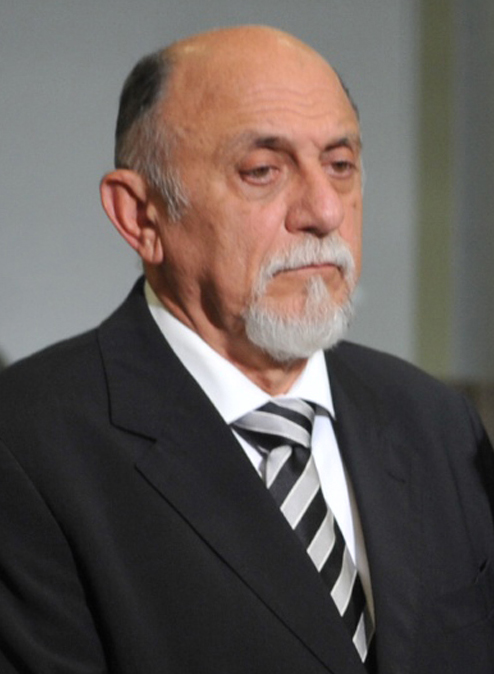
Nominee	Simão Jatene	Helder Barbalho
Party	PSDB	MDB
Running mate	Zequinha Marino	Lira Maia
Governor before election
Simão Jatene
PSDB
Elected Governor
Simão Jatene
PSDB

The Pará gubernatorial election was held on 5 October 2014 to elect the next governor of the state of Pará. If no candidate receives more than 50% of the vote, a second-round runoff election will be held on 26 October. Governor Simão Jatene ran for a second term.

== Candidates ==
=== Coalitions ===
Candidate	Running mate	Coalition
Helder Barbalho; PMDB	Lira Maia; DEM	"All by the Pará" (PMDB, DEM, PT, PR, PDT, PROS, PHS, PCdoB, PSL, PPL, PTN)
Elton Braga; PRTB	Dr. Josenildo; PRTB	-
Zé Carlos do PV; PV	Isaura Guerreiro; PV	-
Simão Jatene; PSDB	Zequinha Marinho; PSC	"Together with the people" (PSDB, PSC, PSD, PSB, PP, SD, PRB, PTB, PPS, PEN, PMN, PTC, PSDC, PTdoB, PRP)
