= Saint Vital =

Saint Vital is the French translation of Saint Vitalis. It can also refer to:

- Saint-Vital, a town and commune in Savoie, France
- St. Vital, Winnipeg, a former independent city in Manitoba, Canada, which is now part of the city of Winnipeg
- St. Vital (electoral district), a provincial riding in the province of Manitoba
