= Vital (surname) =

Vital is a surname. Notable people with the surname include:

- Albert Camille Vital (born 1952), Malagasy Army officer, politician and civil engineer
- Arnaud Vital, a cobbler in the Comté de Foix in the early fourteenth century
- Christian Vital (born 1997), American basketball player in the Israeli Basketball Premier League
- Dinis Vital (1932–2014), Portuguese footballer
- Francisco Vital (born 1954), Portuguese footballer and manager
- Geymond Vital (1897–1987), French actor
- Hayyim ben Joseph Vital (1542–1620), rabbi and Kabbalistic author
- Joaquim Vital (1884–?), Portuguese wrestler
- José Reginaldo Vital (born 1976), Brazilian footballer
- Lionel Vital (born 1963), American football player
- Mark Vital (born 1996), American basketball and football player
- Martha Vital (born 1963), Mexican politician
- Mateus Vital (born 1998), Brazilian footballerteam member
- Pauleus Vital (1917–1984), Haitian artist
- Percival Ivo Vital e Noronha (1923–2019), Indian historian and heritage conservationist
- Raymonde Vital, a woman written about in the 1975 book Montaillou
- Samuel Vital (1598–1677), Kabalist
- Vital Cuinet (1833–1896), French geographer and orientalist
- Yedidya Vital (born 1984), Israeli actor

== See also ==
- Vital (disambiguation)
