= Vitalis, Sator and Repositus =

Early Christian martyrs

Vitalis, Sator and Repositus are a set of early Christian martyrs, three brothers sentenced to death at Velleianum in Apulia, Italy, by the judge Valerian during the reign of the Emperor Maximian, in the early 4th century. Their feast day is 29 August.
