= Vidales =

Vidales is a surname. Notable people with the surname include:

- Abraham Vidales (born 1994), Mexican kickboxer
- Damián Zepeda Vidales (born 1978), Mexican politician
- David Vidales (born 2002), Spanish racing driver
- Javier Vidales (born 1965), Spanish football manager
- Jhonny Vidales (born 1992), Peruvian footballer
- Luis Vidales (1904–1990), Colombian poet and writer
- Octavio Vidales (born 1965), Peruvian footballer

== See also ==
- Vidale
