= Vidal (martyr) =

3rd-century Catholic saint

Saint Vidal
- Born: Complutum
- Died: 293 near Padua
- Cause of death: Martyrdom
- Feast: 2 July

Vidal is a saint of the Catholic Church who lived in the third century. During the Roman rule of the Iberian peninsula, Saint Vidal was born in Complutum (now Alcalá de Henares) in the 3rd century. He was the son of Natal the Confessor, who lived in Rome during the time of Pope Zephyrinus. Vidal came from a notable family. According to tradition, and as recorded by Braulio of Zaragoza, Vidal was the brother or half-brother of Marta de Astorga, though she was martyred in 250 AD, among other differences. Felipe de la Gándara also recounted that Vidal was the brother of Marcellus, who was from León.

Vidal was young when he joined the Roman army and first married. His first son, Saint Natal, was born in Milan; the city would go on to hold an affection for Natal. Vidal then was widowed and returned to Hispania with Natal. In Tielmes, Vidal remarried and with his second wife had two more sons, Justus and Pastor. When his second wife died a few years later, Vidal felt he was meant to be free of the burdens of family and returned to Italy. He left his sons in education and with their aunt Marta in Astorga. Upon his return to the army, he was sent to Campania, where he served under Saint Sebastian. When the Diocletianic Persecution of Christians began, Vidal's friends, twins Mark and Marcellian, were imprisoned in Rome; though Sebastian told the pair to hold true to their faith, Vidal was one of six friends who implored them to reconsider sacrificing their lives.

Sebastian criticised the six as well as the twins' parents for their persuasions, and then performed miracles, converting many people present in the prison, including Vidal. When Sebastian brought the bishop Polycarp to baptize the group, Vidal was second after the twins' father to give his name. As the persecutions continued, many of these followers abandoned Rome, despite Pope Caius asking them to stay in his farewell address, and moved to Campania in exile. For several years they lived as confessors, but were sought out and martyred in 293 AD near Padua. Though the manner of their execution is not known, tradition tells that Vidal's body was separated into many pieces, which were all disposed of in different places; the pieces miraculously found each other and came together to form a perfect body. Diocletian had his officers cut apart Vidal's body two more times, with the same result. His saint day is 2 July, although this was not recorded in the official 2004 Roman Martyrology.
