= Vitalie =

Vitalie is a Romanian masculine given name, common in Moldova. Notable people with the name include:

- Vitalie Bordian (born 1984), Moldovan footballer
- Vitalie Bulat (born 1987), Moldovan footballer
- Vitalie Călugăreanu (born 1977), Moldovan journalist
- Vitalie Cercheș (born 1973), Moldovan runner
- Vitalie Ciobanu (born 1964), Moldovan journalist
- Vitalie Grușac (born 1977), Moldovan boxer
- Vitalie Manaliu (born 1985), Moldovan footballer
- Vitalie Marinuța (born 1970), Moldovan politician
- Vitalie Nagacevschi (born 1965), Moldovan politician
- Vitalie Pîrlog (born 1974), Moldovan politician
- Vitalie Plămădeală (born 1985), Moldovan footballer
- Vitalie Railean (born 1975), Moldovan wrestler
- Vitalie Zlatan (born 1993), Moldovan footballer
- Vitalie Zubac (1894–?), Bessarabian politician
