= Vitali =

Vitali, Vitalii, Vitaly, Vitaliy and may refer to:

== People ==
=== Given name ===
- Vitaly Borker (born 1975 or 1976), Ukrainian American Internet fraudster and cyberbully
- Vitaly Churkin (1952–2017), Russian politician
- Vitaliy Dyrdyra (1938–2024), Ukrainian-Soviet sailor
- Vitaly Ginzburg (1916–2009), Russian physicist
- Vitaly Grachev (born 1979), Ukrainian-Russian singer and songwriter
- Vitaliy Guimaraes (born 2000), American artistic gymnast
- Vitaly Ignatiev (born 1980), foreign minister and diplomat of Moldova's unrecognized breakaway region of Transnistria
- Vitaly Kaloyev (born 1956), Russian architect and convicted murderer
- Vitaliy Khan (born 1985), Kazakh freestyle swimmer
- Vitali Kiryushchenkov (born 1992), Belarusian ice hockey player
- Vitali Klitschko (born 1971), Ukrainian professional boxer
- Vitaliy Kolpakov (born 1972), Ukrainian athlete
- Vitaliy Konovalov (1932–2013), Soviet engineer and politician
- Vitali Konstantinov (born 1949), Russian wrestler
- Vitali Milman (born 1939), Ukrainian-Israeli mathematician
- Vitaly Petrov (born 1938), Ukrainian athletics coach
- Vitaly Petrov (born 1984), Russian racing driver
- Vitaly Scherbo (born 1972), Belarusian and former Soviet gymnast
- Vitali Sevastyanov (1935-2010), Soviet cosmonaut
- Vitaly Solomin (1941-2002), Soviet and Russian actor
- Vitali Taskinen (born 1986), Finnish ice hockey goaltender
- Vitaly (Ustinov) (1910–2006), Metropolitan of the Russian Orthodox Church Outside Russia (1986–2001)
- Vitali Vitaliev (born 1954), British journalist and author
- Vitaly Zdorovetskiy (born 1992), Russian YouTube personality

=== Surname ===
- Ali Vitali (born 1990), American journalist, television analyst, and author
- Alvaro Vitali (1950–2025), Italian actor
- Giancarlo Vitali (1926–2011), Italian footballer and manager
- Giancarlo Vitali (painter) (1929–2018), Italian painter
- Giovanni Battista Vitali (1632–1692), Baroque composer
- Giuseppe Vitali (1875–1932), Italian mathematician
- Giuseppina Vitali (1845-1915), Italian composer and soprano
- Ivan Vitali (1794–1855), Russian sculptor
- Keith Vitali (born 1952), American martial artist, actor, producer, author and child activist
- Leon Vitali (1948–2022), British actor
- Maurizio Vitali (born 1957), Italian motorcycle racer
- Miroslaw Vitali (1914–1992), Polish-British surgeon
- Tommaso Antonio Vitali (1663–1745), Baroque composer

== Other uses ==
- Vitalii
- Vitali Island, Philippines
- Vitali theorem (disambiguation)
