= Vitale =

Vitale is an Italian surname and given name which derives from the Latin word Vita meaning 'life'. The name may refer to:

- Ami Vitale (b. 1971), American photojournalist
- Bobby Vitale (b. 1965), American porn film actor
- Carol Vitale (1946–2008), American model and television hostess
- Carson Vitale (b. 1988), Canadian baseball coach
- Dario Vitale (born 1983), Italian fashion designer
- Dick Vitale (b. 1939), American basketball broadcaster
- Eletise Leafa Vitale, Samoan government minister who plotted and carried out an assassination
- Falaniko Vitale, American mixed martial arts fighter
- Gaetano Vitale (b. 2001), Italian footballer
- Giordano Vitale (1633–1711), Italian mathematician
- Ida Vitale (b. 1923), Uruguayan poet
- Joe Vitale (musician) (b. 1949), American musician
- Joe Vitale (ice hockey) (born 1985), American ice hockey player
- John Vitale (American football) (1965–2000), American college football player
- John Vitale (mobster) (1909–1982), American mobster from St Louis
- Joseph Vitale (politician) (b. 1954), American politician from New Jersey
- Julián Vitale (b. 1995), Argentine footballer
- Leafa Vitale (contemporary), Samoan government minister who plotted an assassination
- Leonardo Vitale (1941–1984), Sicilian Mafia member who became an informant
- Lito Vitale (b. 1961), Argentine musician
- Louie Vitale (1932–2023), American Catholic priest; cofounder of the Nevada Desert Experience
- Luigi Vitale (b. 1987), Italian football player
- Marcello Vitale, Italian musician
- Matt Vitale, American politician
- Milly Vitale (1932–2006), Italian actress
- Ottavio Vitale (born 1959), Italian-born Albanian Roman Catholic bishop
- Raoul Gregory Vitale (1928–2003), Syrian musicologist
- Russell Vitale (b. 1992), Sicilian American rapper
- Salvatore Vitale (b. 1947), American mobster from New York
- Salvo Vitale (1943–2025), Italian poet and writer
- Thomas Vitale, American television network executive
- Vito Vitale (b. 1958), Sicilian Mafia member

== See also ==
- Saint Vitalis (disambiguation)
- Vitali (disambiguation)
