= Josep Elías =

Spanish journalist and athlete

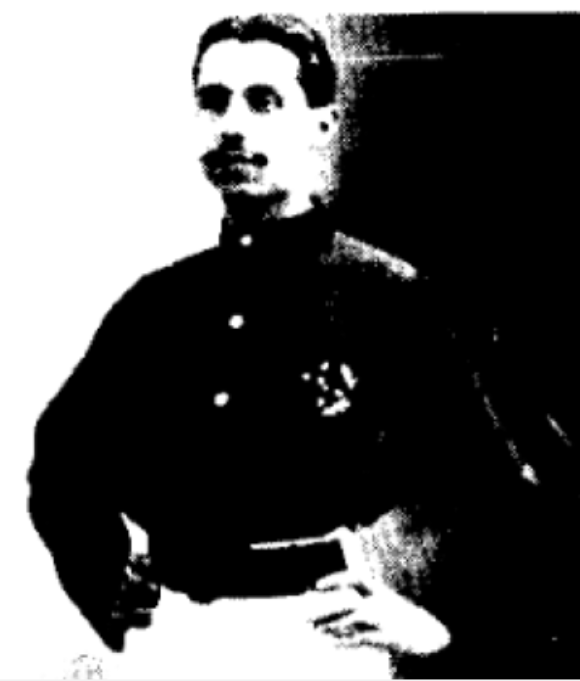
- Elías in 1906, with the uniform of FC Barcelona
- Born: Josep Elías i Juncosa; 27 May 1880; Tarragona, Catalonia, Spain
- Died: 28 January 1944 (aged 63); Barcelona, Catalonia, Spain
- Citizenship: Spanish
- Occupations: Journalist; Athlete
- Known for: President of the Catalan Football Federation
Association football career
- Position: Midfielder
Senior career*
Years	Team	Apps	(Gls)
1900–1903	FC Barcelona		
- * Club domestic league appearances and goals

Gymnastics career
- Discipline: Men's artistic gymnastics

Josep Elías Juncosa (27 May 1880 – 28 January 1944) was a Spanish sports journalist and athlete, who played football as a midfielder for FC Barcelona between 1900 and 1903, although he never played an official match for the club.

He was the first sports journalist to write in Catalan; he contributed to many newspapers and magazines of his time and was, together with Narciso Masferrer, the foundational driving force behind the sports press in Catalonia. He was a key promoter of sports in Catalonia in the first third of the 20th century, helping to create a multitude of sports federations, such as the Spanish Cycling Union, the Spanish Gymnastics Federation, the Catalan Sports Confederation, and also several clubs, such as the Barcelona Swimming Club, FC Barcelona, Sportsmen's Club, Catalunya Lawn Tennis Club, and Hiking Club of Catalonia.

He was involved in other projects that were crucial to Spanish sport, including the creation of the Olympic Committee of Catalonia in 1913, and some consider him as the most important figure in the Olympic history of Spain, since his numerous lectures on Olympicism and sports pedagogy in the 1910s were impactful and forced the Spanish Olympic Committee to work on bringing a delegation to the Olympic Games after failing to do so in the previous edition of 1904, 1906, 1908, and 1912.

== Early life and education ==
Born in Tarragona on 27 May 1880, Elías was the second of seven children, and was eight years old when his family emigrated to Buenos Aires in what seems to be a family tradition, since his mother, Teresa Juncosa, had been born in Uruguay during their parents' visit to that country. Their journey only lasted a year, because, in 1889, they returned to Spain, settling in Barcelona, where Elías grew up.

Elías undertook business and language studies, while expressing himself correctly in French, English, and Italian. His desire to travel led him to make frequent trips, developing a deep interest in the way of life of the inhabitants of the United Kingdom, especially about their deep-rooted sporting beliefs, thus becoming a sports lover. His admiration for the English was evident throughout his life, even in his way of dressing, always "English style".

== Sporting career ==
=== FC Barcelona ===
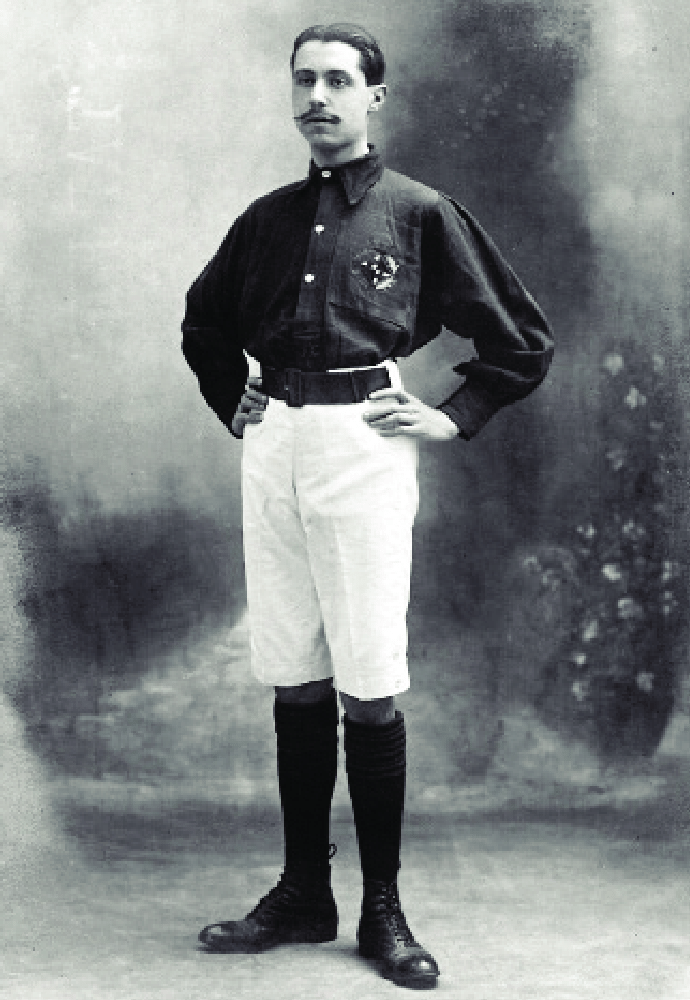
Josep Elías i Juncosa in 1906, with the uniform of FC Barcelona.

Even though he was present at the meeting where FC Barcelona was born on 29 November 1899, Elías only registered as a club member six days later, on 5 December, which means that Barça does not include him in the list of the 12 official founding members. Either way, he was one of its co-founders and one of the first ten members of FC Barcelona. Elías only played three matches for FC Barcelona, one per season between 1900 and 1903, all of which being friendlies, including the first-ever Derbi Barceloní on 23 December 1900, which ended in a 0–0 draw.

Later when he became a journalist, he recalled having witnessed football matches at the Hippodrome of Can Tunis in early 1893, aged 13, between members of the Club de Regatas and Barcelona Football Club, the first-ever incarnation of FC Barcelona that mainly consisted not only of players from the British colony of Barcelona, but also of Catalans, with Elías remembering his fellow sports journalist Alberto Serra as one of the first Catalan footballers. He went on to write almost 500 articles about Barça from 1899 to 1936, with some of them being among the most important and insightful testimonies in the early history of the club.

=== Sports athlete ===
In addition to football, Elías also practiced gymnastics, cycling, sailing, rowing, swimming, fencing, tennis, hiking, horse riding, and motor racing. His greatest sporting passion was dedicated to the sea, joining the Yacht Club in 1899, where he learned to row, swim, and sail, becoming a Yacht Master in 1916 and Yacht Captain in 1927. At the start of the 20th century, Elías was taught to box by his fencing teacher, maestro Federico González, a disciple of Ramón Bergé, and in 1904, he organized the first public boxing exhibition held in Barcelona, in which he defeated the French professor Joseph Vidal at the Sportsmen's Club. In tennis, he promoted the installation of courts as soon as he found a suitable space, being a founding member of the Real Club de Tenis Barcelona in 1899, of which he was an honorary member since 1911. He was also a gymnast, which he practiced daily at the Associació Catalana de Gimnástica, and a cyclist, being an accountant for a bicycle company at the age of 15, and being among those who attended the 1899 cycling demonstration in favor of lowering the municipal tax on bicycles.

Elías was also a notable basketball player, a good horseman, and a pedestrian runner, so it can be said that he was interested in any sporting activity, and, on the occasion of the presence in Barcelona of a group of jiu-jitsu experts in 1907, he was one of the first to promote them in the press. He even organized snow competitions in Ribes, excursions to the French Alps, participated in automobile tests, and regularly attended the congresses of the Spanish Velocipedic Union. Eventually, he began the formation of the Physical Education Commission of the Commonwealth of Catalonia, drafting the rules for its operation and even the bill that was presented to the Assembly.

Even though he had left Tarragona at the age of 8, Elías never forgot his homeland and returned there several times, setting up bicycle trips through Camp de Tarragona in 1899 and 1900, about which he wrote in Los Deportes, and even collaborated with the magazine Pàtria de Tarragona in 1908. He also taught Pau Casais to play tennis, and in 1915, Casais invited him to the inauguration of the tennis court that he had built in his house in Sant Salvador in El Vendrell.

=== Olympic movement ===
In the early 1910s, Elías used to give lectures and conferences on sport and Olympism at the Gimnasio Garcia Alsina, becoming a great critic of the Spanish Olympic Committee (COE), then led by Gonzalo Figueroa y Torres, the Marquess of Villamejor, who had failed to set up a Spanish delegation for the Olympic Games of 1904, 1906, 1908, and 1912, while Narciso Masferrer, who had the same interests and objectives than Elías, adopted a lower profile, hence fulfilling the roles of Good cop, bad cop. In September 1911, he wrote several articles in the newspaper La Veu de Catalunya in which he vindicated the need to send Catalan athletes to the 1912 Olympic Games in Stockholm. In his conferences he stated that the COE was "like the dog in the manger, it neither does nor lets things be done" and described its leaders as "lazy".

Elias's campaign against the inactivity of the COE reached its peak on 19 October 1913, when he gave the infamous conference that marked the starting point of Catalan Olympism. In this conference, he stated that a Catalan Olympic Committee would send a delegation to 1916 Summer Olympics in Berlin in case a Spanish delegation was not achieved, a statement that was echoed and reproduced in various media, which prompted Villamejo to ask for help from the Catalan sports leaders, so that Spain would be in the Olympic Games in a letter addressed to Masferrer. On Christmas Day of 1913, it was announced that the COE had authorized Masferrer to establish an Olympic Committee of Catalonia (COC), and thus, on 18 December 1913, Elías wrote to the president of the International Olympic Committee, Pierre de Coubertin, requesting the recognition of the Catalan Olympic Committee, but the Baron replied that the IOC could not recognize more than one committee per country. Having been forced to accept a Catalan regional committee dependent of the COE, Villamejor became suspicious of Elias' true intentions, so he wrote to Coubertin on 5 January 1914, stating: "I see that you are aware of all the agitation promoted in Barcelona by Mr. Elias Juncosa. It is always the same story, they want to consider themselves independent, without wanting to understand that their only right of existence is to be Spanish".

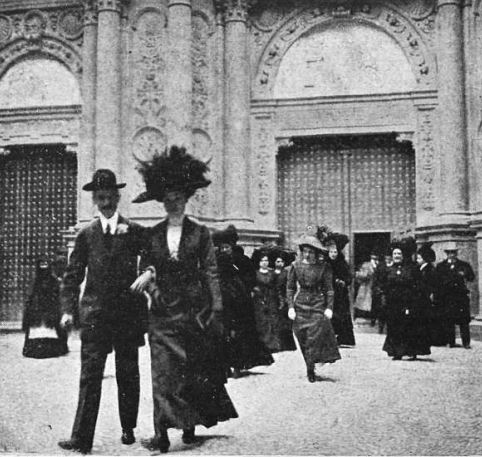
Josep Elías marrying Carlota Campins in 1910.

In 1910, Elías married the distinguished artist Carlota Campins in a ceremony held in the monastery of Montserrat. With the blessing of Coubertin, his wife Campins became the first Spanish interpreter of the Olympic Hymn in 1916. His lectures on Olympicism had the desired outcome because, in 1920, the COE finally set up the first official Spanish delegation to the Olympic Games, with Elías even opening a popular subscription at the bank office where he worked to cover expenses. In the build-up for the 1920 Olympic Games, he published a work entitled Els Jocs Olímpics a l'antiga Grècia ("The Olympic Games of ancient Greece"), to put "before the eyes of all Catalans what were once the famous Olympic Games of Greece". He then headed the COC delegation to the Antwerp Games, where he and Gamper met with Coubertin to present Barcelona's candidacy for the 1924 Olympics.

Elías played a key role in the first Barcelona candidatures to host the Olympic Games in 1924 and 1936, which ended up being held by Paris and Berlin, respectively. In his 1924 attempt, he made several trips around Europe in search of technical information on sports constructions and organization; at the event, he was distinguished for his work in support of the Olympics, receiving a commemorative diploma and medal from the Paris Olympics. Together with Masferrer, he was one of the main promoters of an Olympic Stadium in Barcelona, which was eventually built in 1927. They had first raised this issue in 1914, and two years later, Elías and other members of the Catalan Athletics Federation met with the mayor to claim from the city council the transfer of land on which to build the long-awaited stadium. His active role in promoting the Olympic movement in Catalonia led him to become a personal friend of Coubertin, being the most responsible for his visit to Tarragona on 8 December 1926.

=== Other activities ===
Elías helped to create a multitude of sports federations, such as the Spanish Cycling Union, the Spanish Gymnastics Federation, the Catalan Sports Confederation, and also several clubs, such as the Sportsmen's Club, Catalunya Lawn Tennis Club, and Hiking Club of Catalonia. He also contributed to the construction of the Barcelona Swimming Club, founded by Bernat Picornell and Manuel Solé. The latter was also from Tarragona (Benissanet), and was the owner of the infamous Solé Gymnasium, which housed the headquarters of the numerous associations promoted by Masferer, who was married to a native of Tarragona.

On 15 January 1917, Elías was invited to be the second president of the Catalan Athletics Federation, but he did not accept this position, which was then taken by Joan Matas instead. On 21 January 1922, he participated in the assembly of entities and personalities Catalans who constituted the so-called Sports Confederation of Catalonia.

== Journalistic career ==
In 1898, the 18-year-old Elías published his first article in Barcelona Sport, and he kept doing it in other sports publications, such as Los Deportes, and La Veu de Catalunya, where he began to sign under the pseudonym Corredisses in 1899, which he used for more than thirty years. His fanatical punctuality coupled with his multiple activities frequently forced him to travel quickly and continuously, and the image of Elías running into the newsroom of La Veu de Catalunya to start writing a news story became so common that a co-worker, Raimon Casellas, gave him the nickname Corredisses ("running races"). He also collaborated in both the Illustració Llevantina (1900–01) and the Illustració Catalana (1901–15); and directed the newsletter of the Spanish Cycling Union (1910) and Stadium (1913).

Elías was the first sports journalist to write in Catalan, he contributed to practically all the newspapers and magazines of his time, such as all those mentioned previously, plus Crónica de Barcelona, Vida Marítima (the official organ of the Spanish Maritime League), and Patria. Together with Narciso Masferrer, the true promoter and driving force behind the sports press in Catalonia. Elías and Masferrer, together with Ricardo Cabot, and Jaime Garcia Alsina, founded the Union of Sports Journalists in 1911, whose purpose was to defend, regulate and disseminate sports journalism which until then was self-taught.

In 1924, on the occasion of his silver anniversary in journalism, his friends gave him the "Corredisses", a yacht of six meters in length and a crew that often consisted of only two of his children; he used this yacht to repeatedly toured the Mediterranean coasts. He once described sailing as "the ideal fair play to fulfill our life".

== Writing career ==
In 1913, Elías took charge of the Los Sports library and promoted the dissemination of its collection, of which he was the author of the first volume: Football Asociación, published in 1914. The prologue of this book was written by none other than Joan Gamper, who stated that "at the dawn of football in Barcelona, when the nucleus of players in this beautiful city was made up only of a few volunteers, I met and treated José Elias...". This library published more than 20 volumes, dedicated to several sports, from football to hunting, and all of them being manuals to initiate and train practitioners of the different sports, both in the philosophy and history of the game, as well as in its regulations, technique, training, and tactics, with the majority of texts being illustrated with appropriate drawings and with all of the books being of a "rather surprising exceptional quality for the beginning of the century".

From those 20 volumes, Elías published three, about sport pedagogy (1916), Ball games (1917), and Exercicis de mar ("Sea exercises", 1918), the first sports book of this type in the Catalan language.

== Politic career ==
Politically, Elías was a deep patriot, thus joining the Regionalist League of Catalonia, from which he promoted Barcelona's Olympic candidacy for the 1924 Olympic Games. He was also a personal friend of its leaders Enric Prat de la Riba, Juan Ventosa, and especially from Francesc Cambó.

== Later life and death ==
Outside sports, Elías was a bank employee at Credit Lionais, Banco di Roma, and Banco Español de Crédito.

Throughout his life, Elias was always firm and consistent with his ideas, so he refused to renounce his deep-rooted Catholicism, even in the worst moments of the Spanish Civil War, at the end of which the new Francoist authorities purged him due to his Catalanist past as a militant in the Regionalist League.

Elías died in Barcelona on 28 January 1944, at the age of 63.

== Legacy ==
The centenary of his birth on 27 May 1980 was ignored, which led the local press to state that "incomprehensibly, the current sporting generations are unaware of someone who was a multifaceted athlete, founder, promoter, partner, and leader of the majority of sports entities in Barcelona and many in Catalonia". In 1992, his son Raimon wrote his biography, Josep Elias i Juncosa "Corredisses", a forerunner of Catalan Olympism.

Despite his importance in the history of Catalan sport, Elias does not have any recognition in his hometown, such as a street or a sports facility named after him, or a plaque on the house where he was born. On 17 October 2018, he was posthumously awarded the Diploma of Sporting Merit by the City Council, which means that his figure is beginning to be vindicated. And indeed, it was not until a century after the first article signed by Corredisses that his descendants began vindicating a figure who "goes beyond journalism". 12 grandchildren, 22 great-grandchildren and 11 great-great-grandchildren of Elias signed a letter sent to Josep Maria Bartomeu, the then Barcelona president, in which they requested "formal recognition" of their ancestor "as founder of the club in 1899".

== Works ==
- Football Asociación (1914)
- Els Jocs de Pilota. Noticia i Regles (1917)
- Exercicis de Mar (1918)
- Els Jocs Olímpics a l'antiga Grècia (1920)
- Per la mar (1933)
