= Rosich =

Rosich is a Catalan surname.. Notable persons with the name include:

- Antoni Rosich i Catalan (1866-1958), Catalonian writer
- Cosme Vidal i Rosich (1869-1918), Catalonian writer
- Domènec Carles i Rosich (1888-1962), Catalonian painter and writer
- Joaquim Rosich (1895–1953), Spanish water polo player and sports leader
- José Rosich (1884–1960), Spanish former president of the Catalonia Football Federation
- Miguel Rosich y Más (ca. 1830–1907), a Mayor of Ponce, Puerto Rico
- Paolo Rosich (1780–1832), Spanish-born opera singer and librettist
- Plàcid Vidal i Rosich (1881-1938), Catalonian poet and writer
- Vanna Marie Rosich, now Vanna White (born 1957), American television personality and film actress

== See also ==
- Rusich (disambiguation)
- Rosić, which may spelled phonetically as Rosich
