= Jaime Garcia Alsina =

Spanish doctor (1874–1936)

- Born: Jaume Garcia i Alsina; 28 March 1874; Barcelona, Catalonia, Spain
- Died: 20 September 1936 (aged 62); Barcelona, Catalonia, Spain
- Occupations: Doctor; Journalist; Sports leader
- Known for: First president of the Catalan Olympic Committee

2nd President of the Catalan Athletics Federation
- In office 15 January 1917 – 15 March 1918
- Preceded by: Àlvar Presta
- Succeeded by: Joan Matas

6th President of the Catalan Athletics Federation
- In office 11 March 1920 – 12 December 1921
- Preceded by: Augusto Pi
- Succeeded by: Joan Boix Iglesias

9th President of the Catalan Athletics Federation
- In office 31 December 1922 – 24 February 1923
- Preceded by: José Antonio Trabal
- Succeeded by: Carles Comamala

Jaime Garcia Alsina (28 March 1874 – 20 September 1936) was a Spanish doctor, professor of medicine and gymnastics, sports promoter and leader. During the first decades of the 20th century, he was involved in many Catalan sports initiatives, both in gymnastics and athletics, being the second president of the Catalan Athletics Federation in 1917–18, in 1920–21 and 1922–23. He was also the first president of the Catalan Olympic Committee and a key figure in the development of sport and Olympism in Catalonia. He organized gymnastic tables, athletic competitions, "School Hygiene" congresses and participated in various organisations.

== Early life ==
Jaime Garcia was born on 28 March 1874 in Barcelona, the son of Pere Garcia i Corbera (1833–1903) and Josepa Alsina i Gonfaus, who already had three children from her previous marriage, including sports promoter Eduardo Tolosa, Jaime's half brother.

His father founded the Gimnasio García in 1868 in Barcelona to give lessons to the fire department, of which he was the chief. He later opened the lessons to the public.

== Professional career ==
Following in the footsteps of his father, he founded the Gimnasio Garcia Alsina in 1904, which would become known as the "Kinesiterapic Institute". Featuring a garden and the most modern equipment of the time, it competed with the Gimnasio Blume in terms of training gymnasts and winning titles. This was not only Garcia's gym, but also his therapeutic center. The Kinesiterapic Institute was the first place in Spain in which women's basketball (November 1912) and Swedish gymnastics, among other sports, were practiced. Lectures by Josep Elías on sport and Olympism were also held there, and in 1913, he gave the conference that marked the starting point of Catalan Olympism. Garcia also worked as a professor of medicine and gymnastics, and introduced the practice of sports as a hygiene and health benefit.

In 1910 García went on a European excursion with his friends from Los Deportes and La Veu de Catalunya, which served to increase his notoriety and offer news from abroad, such as those regarding Basketball. Along with Narciso Masferrer, Ricardo Cabot, and Josep Elías, Garcia was one of the pioneers of sports journalism in Catalonia. With them, he founded the Union of Sports Journalists in 1911, whose purpose was to defend, regulate and disseminate sports journalism which used to be self-taught.

== Sporting career ==
In 1915, Garcia was one of the founders of the Catalan Athletics Federation, the very first federation of such in Catalonia, becoming its first treasurer under the presidency of Àlvar Presta. On 15 January 1917, he was appointed as the second president of the institution, a position he held for over a year, until 15 March 1918, when he was replaced by Joan Matas (only because Elías did not accept it). In total, he held the presidency in three different periods between 1917 and 1923. He was also the first president of the Spanish Wrestling Federation in 1914 as well as the first president of the Catalan Wrestling Federation between 1924 and 1932, which he himself founded. He left the presidency of the Catalan Federation in 1932 and the Spanish Federation two years later, occupying the honorary presidency.

== Olympism ==
Garcia organized events and conferences to promote the culture of Olympism and the creation of the Olympic Committee of Catalonia (COC), which was founded in 1920 as a subcommittee of the Spanish Olympic Committee (SOC). Garcia was elected first president of the Catalan Olympic Committee, which he represented in the 1920 Olympic Games in Antwerp, where he met Baron de Coubertin. At the opening ceremony of the 1920 Games, he paraded behind the Marquis de Villamejor. In 1924, COC authorized the development of weightlifting at his gym, and also commissioned him to organize a competition for the selection and preparation of athletes with the aim of the 1924 Games in Paris, which he attended as a delegate of the wrestling team since at this time he was president of the Catalan and Spanish Greco-Roman Wrestling Federations.

Due to the failure of the SOC to request the celebration of the 1924 Games for Barcelona, the dictatorship of Primo de Rivera decided to purge the Catalan managers, including Garcia, on 11 January 1924. In the following year, on June 25, 1924, he decided to found the Agrupació Olímpica del Gimnàs Garcia as a "cultural and sports society whose objective is the regeneration of our race, through the practice of the Olympic trials and as a basis gymnastics sports". On 12 July 1924, the organization was officially established, having as a mission the sending of Spanish representatives to the Olympic Games; this was the first Olympic committee in Spain in accordance with the Law of Associations of 1887. At last in 1926, Garcia was readmitted to the COE, which was the one registered as an Olympic Group in the registry of the Civil Government instead of the Alsina Group. He was thus a member of the Spanish Olympic Committee (1926), in which, in 1931, he presented Barcelona's candidacy to host the 1936 Olympic Games.

== Later life ==
During the 1930s, Garcia was a delegate of the SOC and organizer of conferences in order to promote gymnastics, sport, and hygiene among the young and the elderly. He collaborated with the Ministry of Public Instruction of the Directorate of Primo de Rivera, studying the regulations of National Physical Education and pre-military Instruction and making known what physical education and sports were like abroad by organizing an International Graphic Exhibition of Physical Education, Physiotherapy, Sports and Tourism in his gym. In 1934, he promoted the First Catalan Congress of Physical Education, chaired by Augusto Pi, being a member of it together with the likes of Carles Comamala.

== Personal life ==
His son, Joan Garcia y Rodríguez, had been the leader of the Catalan Winter Sports Federation and participated in the 1936 Winter Olympics in Garmisch-Partenkirchen. Both Garcia and his son were assassinated during the first days of the Spanish Civil War on 20 September 1936 (the same day that he was to participate in the Winter Olympics) by one of the many groups of "uncontrolled" people who spread terror among right-wing people and Catholics in Barcelona. His corpse appeared tortured and disfigured next to that of his son.
