= Ponsati =

Ponsati or Ponsatí is a Spanish surname. Notable people with the surname include:

- Clara Ponsatí (born 1957), Catalan economist and politician
- Nemesi Ponsati (1887–1980), Spanish pharmacist, pedagogue, and sports leader
- Josep Ponsatí (born 1947), Catalan artist
- Biel Vicens Ponsati (born 2004), Spanish footballer
