= Tarruella =

Tarruella is a surname. Notable people with the surname include:

- Concepció Tarruella (1949–2024), Spanish nurse and politician
- José Tarruella (1870–1958), Spanish doctor and sports leader
- Ramón Massó Tarruella (1928–2017), Spanish media and communications expert
