= Sports Federation Union of Catalonia =

- Abbreviation: UFEC
- Formation: 3 July 1933
- Headquarters: Barcelona, Catalunya
- President: Gerard Esteva i Viladecans
- Affiliations: 69
- Website: http://www.ufec.cat/

The Sports Federation Union of Catalonia (Catalan: Unió de Federacions Esportives de Catalunya), generally known by its acronym UFEC is a private and non-profit sports association founded in 1933 under the name of the Catalan Union of Sports Federations (Catalan: Unió Catalana de Federacions Esportives, UCFE) and restored in 1985 by the Generalitat of Catalonia. Its mission is to coordinate and grow the Catalan sports federations. Its headquarters are in Barcelona, Spain.

The current president of the UFEC is Gerard Esteva i Viladecans.

== Antecedents ==
The Catalan Union of Sports Federations (UCFE) was created to fill the gap that the Sports Confederation of Catalonia, founded in 1922, had left. The Confederation had entered into a deep crisis until practically disappearing at the end of 1931. The sports federations saw the need to work in a coordinated fashion at the beginning of 1933, which was when they set up a commission to draft the constitution of a new entity that would represent Catalan federated sports.

== History ==
=== Constitution ===
==== Catalan Union of Sports Federations ====
UCFE was constituted on 3 July 1933 at the headquarters of its main backer, the Catalan Fighting Federation, in an assembly of federations called for that purpose. Representatives from a dozen Catalan sports entities were present. Six others joined in, bringing the number of founders to 18 federations.

==== Official incorporation by the Generalitat ====
The Union was declared an official corporation by the Generalitat of Catalonia on 17 July 1934 through decree. The decree specified that in order to achieve official status, an advisory board would be created with the mission of collaborating with the Generalitat of Catalonia in coordinating and regulating Catalan sports.

The UCFE ceased its activity in 1936 due to the Spanish Civil War.

=== The restoration ===
The UFEC was restored 49 years later, after Franco's dictatorship and after the State of Autonomies had been established. The Generalitat of Catalonia revived the organisation through the 196/85 Decree of 15 July 1985. The decree created the Union of Catalan Sports Federations (Catalan: Unió de Federacions Esportives Catalanes), which changed its name to the Sports Federation Union of Catalonia (Catalan: Unió de Federacions Esportives de Catalunya) in 1996, under the presidency of David Moner.

18 presidents of Catalan sports federations met a week later, on 23 July 1985 and agreed to call for an assembly that would constitute the UFEC, elect the board of directors, elect the president and write its statutes. The assembly was celebrated on 31 July at the function hall of the General Direction of Sport for Catalonia, with the participation of 39 of the 47 Catalan federations that were legally constituted at the time.

Joan de la Llera, president of the Catalan Gymnastics Federation, was chosen as the provisional president for the UFEC as the only candidate with support of 39 federations. Nine members were also chosen for the provisional board of directors: Francesc Josep d'Abadal (Catalan Polo Federation), Jordi Batalla (Olympic Archery Federation), Francesc Colomer (Riding Federation), Àngel Font (Motorsports Federation), Joan Garrigós (Federation of Hiking Entities of Catalonia), Francesc Isard (Winter Sports Federation), Josep Maria Martí (Petanque Federation), Joan Maria Roig (Sailing Federation) and Emili Serna (Judo Federation).

The provisional board of directors wrote the statutes which were approved unanimously in an assembly celebrated on 18 November 1985 at the hall of the Catalan Basketball Federation, with the presence of 26 federations.

Once the UFEC was constituted and its statutes approved, an electoral process was started to choose the definitive president and board of directors. An Extraordinary General Assembly was held on 19 December 1985, once again in the hall of the General Direction of Sport for Catalonia. Joan de la Llera, the sole candidate, was elected as the definitive president. The first board of directors was elected with him: Guillem Ros (Athleticism Federation) as first vice-president; Àngel Font (Motorsports Federation) as second vice-president; Josep Ferrer Peris (Tennis Federation) as treasurer; Josep d'Abadal (Polo Fedederation) as secretary and five board members: Joan Anton Camuñas (Sailing Federation), Enric Piquet (Basketball Federation), Jordi Batalla (Olympic Archery Federation), Antoni Guasch (Football Federation) and Joan Garrigós (Federation of Hiking Entities of Catalonia). The first board meeting was held on 16 January 1986, where Francesc Martínez i Massó, ex-president of the Hiking Federation was nominated as general secretary.

A new chapter for sports was opened with the publication of Decree 70/1994 on 22 March, which regulated Catalan sports federations and was consolidated on 31 July with the 1/2000 Sport Law. Today, 69 Catalan federations are members of the UFEC and benefit from its services and resources.

== Presidencies ==
=== Pompeu Fabra i Poch (1933–36) ===
Apart from his activity as a philologist, Pompeu Fabra was a sports aficionado. Drawn in mainly by hiking, he was a member of the Catalan Hiking Center from 1891 while he played tennis at the same time. From 1912 onwards he was part of FC Barcelona's tennis division until 1935. He was one of the founders of the Badalone Lawn Tennis Club and a member of the Masnou Tennis Club. From 1927 to 1935 he presided over the Lawn-Tennis Association of Catalonia, the precursor to the Catalan Federation, a title he held while also being president of Palestra from 1930 and president of UCFE. In 1933 he was elected by the Assembly of Federations to be their president, along with Joan Roca as secretary; Francesec Fàbregues as vice-secretary; Lluís Ortín as treasurer; Francesc Guarner as accountant; Càndid Vidal de llobatera as archivist; Joan Boix as librarian and Jaume Güell; Josep Sunyol, Ramon Peypoch as vice-presidents. He was the highest authority in Catalan sports during the Republican years.

There is little information about his mandate as head of UFEC but there are records of the organisation of the First Sports Week between 25 May and 2 June 1935 in which, without official subsidies, a large variety of sports activities were planned.

He was also the main driver behind a weekly radio show dedicated to the Catalan federations, broadcast by Radio Barcelona between 1934 and 1936.

=== Joan de la Llera Trens (1985–87) ===
De la Llera was president at the same time of UFEC and the Catalan Gymnastics Federation. He was already president of the Catalan Gymnastics Federation, the Catalan Association of Sports Directors and vice-president of the Spanish Gymnastics Federation when he became president of UFEC.

Joan de la Llera lived through 17 October 1986, when Barcelona was nominated for the 1992 Summer Olympics, but had very little time to start projects as he died in a car crash on 11 December 1987, shortly before the Sports Law (Catalan: Llei de l'esport) was passed, a law he had been a firm champion of.

=== Guillem Ros Massot (1987–1988) ===
Guillem Ros became acting president when Joan de la Llera died. Guillem was the president of the Catalan Athleticism Federation and vice-president of the Directors Council of UFEC since its creation and occupied the presidency until May 1988, when Enric Piquet was elected as the new president.

=== Enric Piquet i Miquel (1988–1996) ===
Enric Piquet was president of the Catalan Basketball Federation and was already a member of the board of directors that had been presided by Joan de la Llera. On 26 April 1988 he became the single candidate for the presidency after merging with the other candidate, Alexandre Solar Cabot, president of the Catalan Federation of Modern Pentathlon. In 1992, shortly before the Olympic Games, he was re-elected when UFEC was 57 federations strong. In 1996 he didn't present himself for re-election due to a new law that prevented a federation president from running and he still wanted to be leading basketball. We can highlight from his mandate how he championed the Catalan federations and their role in society, along with the creation of the UFEC Language Services, that have fought for the widespread use of Catalan in sports since 1989. The Generalitat published the 70/1994 Decree of 22 March during his presidency, through which Catalan sports federations were to be regulated. In 1995 UFEC won management rights for the Estació del Nord Sports Centre, which opened up an important chapter in its process of self-finance.

=== David Moner i Cordina (1996–2014) ===
David Moner become president after winning 25 November 1996 elections over Alexandre Soler-Cabot and Leandre Negre. During his several mandates, through which he was re-elected 4 times without opposition, UFEC intensified its task in promoting, defending and representing Catalan federated sport in its entirety. They worked hand-in-hand with the General Secretary of Sport for the international recognition of Catalan sports teams and started the Catalan Sports Festival. Above all else David Moner worked hard to turn the Union into a services entity with solid financial backing.

UFEC won the 25-year contract to manage the Estació del Nord Sports Center in 1998. Since then it has worked on expanding and renovating the sports centre, which included adding a swimming pool which was opened to the public in 1999. Other sports centres gradually came under the management of UFEC. In 2004, the Catalan Olympic Committee (COC), which nowadays still defending its international recognition, was integrate into the UFEC. On 1 July 2014 David Moner left the presidency and Gerard Esteva, after having served as vice-president, became the new president of the UFEC.

== Objectives ==
UFEC's mission is representing and promoting federated sport in Catalonia, as well as collaborating with public and private bodies to develop sports in general, ensuring the promotion of Catalan sports teams, federated sports clubs of Catalonia and their athletes in the autonomic as well as international arenas to promote Catalonia as a sporting nation. UFEC is an advisor to the General Secretary of Sport for Catalonia.

== Activities and promotion ==
UFEC offers a media presence to all sports disciplines that are performed in Catalonia, through different pages in newspapers, the weekly ZonaUFEC show which is broadcast through the TV channel Esport3 which belongs to TV3 and its own online television channel UFECtv. Since 2011 it has had its own archive where you can download and watch all published news items.

UFEC also organises different events throughout the year that help people learn about sport in all of its rich variety:

- Catalan Sports Festival
- Silver Badges for Ex-Presidents
- Champions Medal of Catalonia
- Federated Sports Fair
- Female Sports Director of the Year Award
- Cartoon and graphical humour sports contest

== Resources ==
UFEC has its own resources thanks to the management, through different administrative concessions, of 6 sports installations which are: the Estació del Nord sports center, the Complex Esportiu Municipal d'Arella, the Complex Esportiu Municipal Fondo de les Creus d'Arenys de mar, the Complex Esportiu Sot de les granotes a Sant Celona, the Piscina Municipal de Salt and the municipal swimming pools Joan Serra of Sabadell. Another important income stream is the Unifedesport Insurance Company which was created in 2003 to manage insurance policies for federations, clubs, entities, sports centres and their athletes. Profits are distributed amongst the federations.

== List of Federations that are member of the UFEC (in Catalan) ==
- Federació Catalana d'Activitats Subaquàtiques
- Federació Aèria Catalana
- Federació Catalana d'Agility
- Federació Catalana d'Atletisme
- Federació Catalana d'Automobilisme
- Federació Catalana de Bàdminton
- Federació Catalana de Ball Esportiu
- Federació Catalana de Basquetbol
- Federació Catalana de Beisbol i Softbol
- Federació Catalana de Billar
- Federació Catalana de Bitlles i Bowling
- Federació Catalana de Boxa Amateur
- Federació Catalana de Caça
- Federació Catalana d'Esports per a Cecs
- Federació Catalana de Ciclisme
- Federació Catalana de Coloms Esportius
- Federació Catalana de Coloms Missatgers
- Federació de Curses d'Orientació de Catalunya
- Federació Catalana de Dards
- Federació Catalana d'Esports de Persones amb Discapacitat Física
- Federació Catalana d'Esports per a Disminuïts Psíquics (ACELL)
- Federació d'Entitats Excursionistes de Catalunya
- Federació Catalana d'Esquaix i Raquetbol
- Federació Catalana d'Esquí Nàutic
- Federació Catalana d'Escacs
- Federació Catalana d'Esgrima
- Federació Catalana d'Esports d'Hivern
- Federació Catalana d'Espeleologia
- Federació Catalana de Físic-Culturisme
- Federació Catalana de Futbol
- Federació Catalana de Futbol Americà
- Federació Catalana de Futbol Sala
- Federació Catalana de Gimnàstica
- Federació Catalana de Golf
- Federació Catalana d'Halterofília
- Federació Catalana d'Handbol
- Federació Catalana d'Hípica
- Federació Catalana d'Hoquei
- Federació Catalana de Judo i DA
- Federació Catalana de Karate
- Federació Catalana de Kick Boxing i Muay Thai
- Federació Catalana de Korfbal
- Federació Catalana de Lluita
- Federació Catalana de Motociclisme
- Federació Catalana de Motonàutica
- Federació Catalana de Natació
- Federació Catalana de Pàdel
- FE Catalana Paràlisi Cerebral
- Federació Catalana de Patinatge
- Federació Catalana de Pentatló Modern
- Federació Catalana de Pesca Esportiva i Càsting
- Federació Catalana de Petanca
- Federació Catalana de Pilota
- Federació Catalana de Piragüisme
- Federació Catalana de Pitch and Putt
- Federació Catalana de Polo
- Federació Catalana de Rem
- Federació Catalana de Rugbi
- Federació Catalana de Salvament i Socorrisme
- FE de Sords de Catalunya
- Federació Catalana de Taekwondo
- Federació Catalana de Tennis
- Federació Catalana de Tennis de Taula
- Federació Catalana de Tir amb Arc
- Federació Catalana de Tir Olímpic
- Federació Catalana de Triatló
- Federació Catalana de Twirling
- Federació Catalana de Vela
- Federació Catalana de Voleibol
