= Eduardo Tolosa =

Spanish professor and gymnastics educator

- Born: Eduardo Tolosa i Alsina; Vila de Gràcia, Barcelona, Spain
- Citizenship: Spanish
- Occupations: Professor; Gymnastics educator
- Known for: Founder of Gimnàs Tolosa

Eduardo Tolosa Alsina was a Spanish professor of calligraphy and gymnastics educator who founded the Gimnàs Tolosa in the 1880s under the name Gimnasio Médico, a Barcelona multi-sport gymnasium. Toghet with his wife Emília Colomer, he was a pioneer in women's gymnastics, being the director of a recreational Gymnasium for both sexes and with separate departments in the 1890s.

== Early life ==
Eduardo Tolosa was born in Vila de Gràcia, as the son of Eduard Tolosa i Alsina and Josepa Alsina i Gonfaus. He was the youngest of three children, Aurelio (1861–1938) and Trinidad. After his father died in the early 1870s, his mother remarried, now with Pere Garcia i Corbera (1833–1903), and one of their children was the doctor and sports promoter Jaime Garcia Alsina, who was thus Tolosa's half-brother. His stepfather founded Gimnasio de Gracia in 1868.

Tolosa married Emília Colomer, and the couple had two children, including Eduardo, one of the world's first neurosurgeons, a pioneer in the surgical treatment of Parkinson's disease and discoverer of the Tolosa–Hunt syndrome.

== Sporting career ==
Tolosa was one of the few Catalans who studied at the Escuela Central de Gimnástica in Madrid (1887–1892), a short-lived school that worked as the first Spanish center for the specific training of Physical Education teachers, thus being one of the few teachers with an official gymnastics title in Barcelona. In the 1880s, Tolosa founded the Gimnàs Tolosa under the name Gimnasio Médico, a Barcelona multi-sport gymnasium where fencing, athletics, boxing, and Greco-Roman wrestling was also practiced. With a hygienist tradition, it was much frequented by the Catalan bourgeoisie at the end of the 19th century and it was domiciled on Carrer del Duque de la Victòria.

Tolosa and his wife were in charge of directing "theoretical and practical gymnastics" in the gymnasium rooms that they both owned. His wife Emilia Colomer, who in Barcelona stood out – according to the press – as the most accredited female teacher in teaching gymnastics, worked at the Escuela de Institutrices (School of Governesses), a school for women, and also worked at the Sagrado Corazón and Nuestra Señora de Loreto schools, and in the Municipal Schools of Barcelona, as well as in other prestigious schools. This aspect shows how teachers dedicated to physical education, whether men or women, had to combine several jobs at the same time to make a living from this profession. Tolosa played a crucial role in contributing to making the practice of women's gymnastics visible, becoming the director of a recreational Gymnasium for both sexes, with separate departments, shower and massage rooms, and all the derivations known in Gymnastics.

In 1898, under the guidance of physical education teacher Jaime Vila Capdevila, Gimnàs Tolosa organized the first official race in Barcelona, which ran between Barcelona and Sarrià. The sport of football began taking root in the city in the 1890s, and soon it gained followers among members belonging his gym, where Tolosa and Vila were introduced to football by his younger students, and soon the gym's members created the football team Sociedad Deportiva Tolosa, which trained at the Velódromo de la Bonanova. In the same year, Vila and his students founded in a meeting held at the Tolosa Gym, the Català FC, the second-ever official football club in Barcelona behind Joan Gamper's FC Barcelona, which was also founded in a gym, the Gimnasio Solé of Francisco Solé. In fact, Tolosa, Vila, and Solé, as well as Narciso Masferrer and Ángel Rodríguez, began to promote football among that generation of Barcelona gymnasts to being an outdoor sport, which they considered as more appropriate to Spain's climate and their national peculiarities, hence why most of the first Barcelona clubs were born in gyms and under the protection and encouragement of characters linked to the Spanish Gymnastics Federation, such as Vila and Masferrer.

In 1900, the Tolosa Gym joined the Spanish Gymnastic Federation, which at the time was under the presidency of Rafael Rodríguez Méndez, and it continued to organize gymnastics evenings during the first half of the 20th century until it disappeared before the Spanish Civil War.

== Professional career ==
Tolosa later became a teacher in both Secondary Education and Normal Schools. According to the yearbook of the University of Barcelona of the 1902–03 academic year, which at the time was under the rectorship of Rafael Rodríguez Méndez, Tolosa was a teacher of calligraphy who lived in Duque de la Vitoria, as well as a "special assistant" of gymnastics.

In 1909, Tolosa, then the teacher of calligraphy at the Institute of Barcelona, together with fellow professors of drawing and calligraphy from the Normal Schools of other cities, sent a declaration to the Ministry of Public Instruction stating that by virtue of the second paragraph of the Royal order of 25 November 1908, they "must occupy the top of the ranking of the calligraphy teaching staff", which they eventually achieved since they had performed their positions since 1898 without interruption. On 7 July 1910, the general director of the Ministry of public instruction sent for examination "the calligraphy program of the professor of the Barcelona Institute Eduardo Tolosa y Alsina". Tolosa was also a gymnastic assistant at the Institute of Barcelona.

The date of his death is unknown.
