= Joan Roca =

Joan Roca may refer to:

- Joan Roca i Caball (1898-1976), Catalan politician
- Joan Roca i Fontané (born 1964), Catalan gourmet chef
