= Rusić =

Rusić, Rusič also spelled Rusic without diacritics, is a South Slavic surname, literally meaning "Rus person". Notable persons with that surname include:

- Dejan Rusič (born 1982), Slovenian retired footballer
- Dushan Rusic, Australian pitcher
- Rita Rusić, Croatian-born Italian producer, actress and singer

== See also ==
- Rusich (disambiguation)
- Rosic
