= Josep Plantada =

Spanish architect and sports leader

José Plantada
- Born: Josep Plantada i Artigas; 14 February 1884; Barcelona, Catalonia, Spain
- Died: 1943 (aged 63-64); Barcelona, Catalonia, Spain
- Citizenship: Catalan
- Occupations: Architect; Sports leader
- Known for: President of the Catalan Football Federation

President of the Catalan Football Federation
- In office 1930–1931
- Preceded by: Josep Sunyol
- Succeeded by: Francesc Costa

José Plantada Artigas (7 June 1879 – 1943) was a Spanish modernist architect and sports leader who was the president of both the Catalan Football Federation and the Júpiter Sports Club.

== Early life and education ==
José Plantada was born on 7 June 1879 in Barcelona, to Josep Plantada i Forés (1845–1913), a surveyor and master builder born in Barcelona, and Joaquima Artigas i Ramoneda, also from Barcelona. He graduated from the Barcelona School of Architecture in 1902.

== Architectural career ==
In 1904, Plantada began working at Barcelona City Council as an assistant in the Faculty Office of Urbanization and Works, and just three years later, in 1907, he became Head of Division of the same Office. Between 1903 and 1914, he built several houses in Barcelona, such as Casa Cipriano Calvet (1903), Casa J. Sagarra (1904–05), Casa Alberto Pujol (1906), Casa Andrés Parés (1907), but his standout work was the Casa Queraltó on Rambla de Catalunya, which Plantada built in the years 1906 and 1907 with a clear modernist influence.

In 1911, Plantada was awarded a prize in the City Council of Barcelona's annual competition for artistic buildings for his work in Cine Ideal. In 1916 he built the casino in the Parc de la Ciutadella, in French Renaissance style; it had two floors, the lower one was used as a cafe-restaurant and the upper one was where the casino was located, but it was demolished in 1964.

In 1927, Plantada became interim head of the Hygiene, Health and Assistance Services, the position from which he carried out the Hospital del Mar project, and in 1932, he was appointed head of the Health and Hygiene Buildings Service.

== Sporting career ==
In 1930, Plantada was elected president of the Catalan Football Federation, a position that he held for a year until 1931, when he was replaced by Francesc Costa. He was also the president of the Júpiter Sports Club.

== Later life and death ==
In 1940, after the Spanish Civil War, Plantada was relieved of his position as a Barcelona Municipal Architect and went into forced retirement. Plantada died in 1943, at the age of either 63 or 64, and in July 1943, his wife Encarnació de Gràcia i Casas was granted a widow's pension.
