= Manuel Solé =

Spanish athlete and sports leader

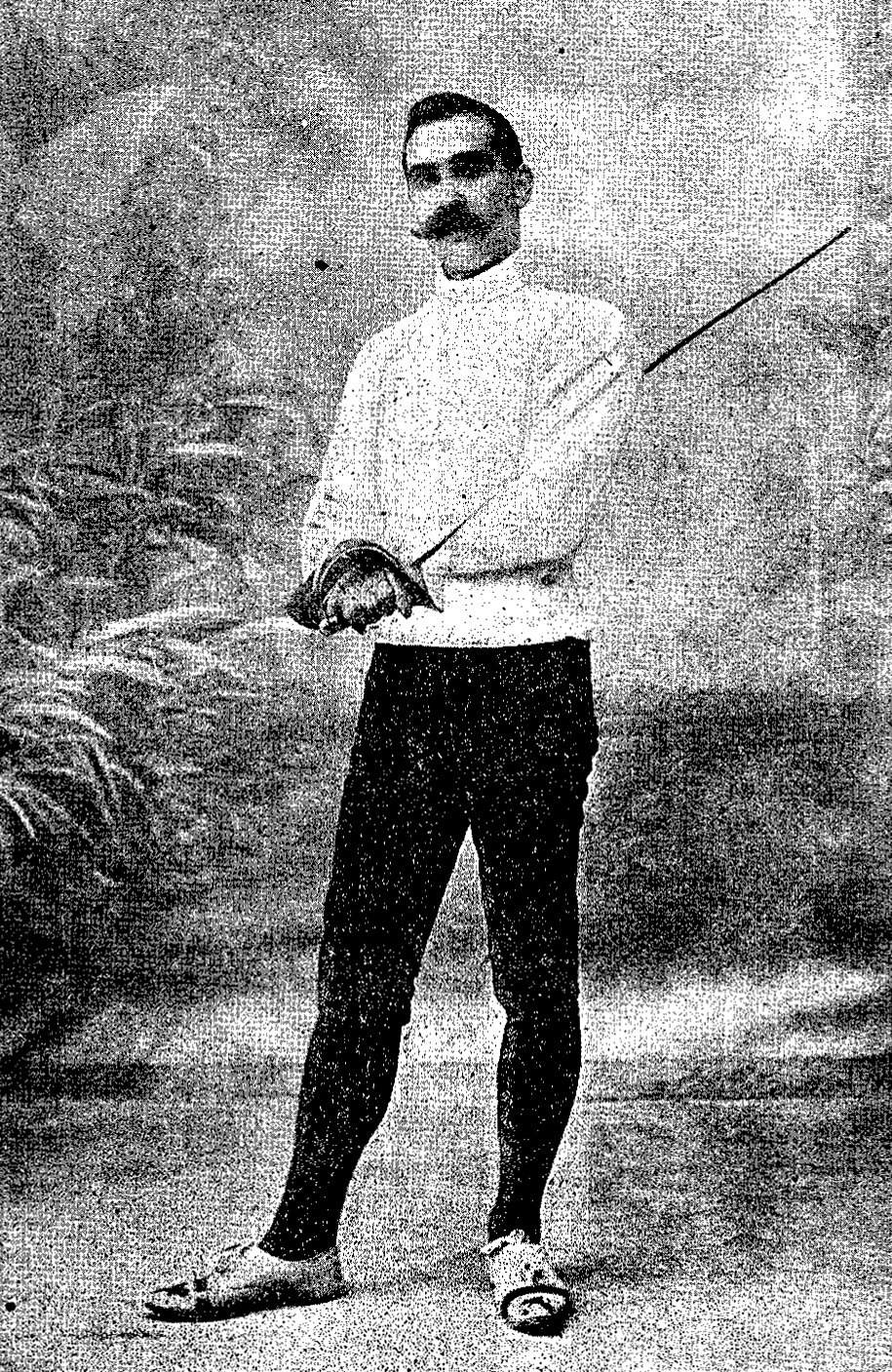
- Manuel Grau Solé
- Born: Manuel Grau Solé; 26 December 1872; Benissanet, Tarragona, Spain
- Died: 7 May 1934 (aged 61); Barcelona, Catalonia, Spain
- Citizenship: Spanish
- Occupations: Athlete, Sports leader
- Known for: Co-founder of FC Barcelona
Association football career
- Position: Defender
Senior career*
Years	Team	Apps	(Gls)
1900	FC Barcelona	2	(0)
1901	Català FC	+2	(+0)
- * Club domestic league appearances and goals

Manuel "Manolo" Grau Solé (26 December 1872 – 7 May 1934) was a Spanish athlete and sports leader, who was a prominent gymnast, fencer, and practitioner and disseminator of many other sports. He was one of the first members of FC Barcelona, for whom he played two friendly matches in 1900. He was also co-founder and vice president of the Barcelona Swimming Club in 1907, founder and president of the Solé Pedestre Club (1909), and owner of the Gimnasio Solé from 1910 until his death.

== Early and personal life ==
Solé was born on 26 December 1872 in Benissanet, in the Ribera d'Ebre, at the age of 23, and moved to Barcelona under the tutelage of his uncle, Francisco Solé, who ran an important gym on Carrer del Carme in Montjuïc. In this environment, he became one of the pioneers in sports practice in Barcelona, working as a gymnastics teacher and standing out as a fencer, a discipline in which he won several tournaments.

Solé married Magdalena Sans, but the couple had no children. His brother Juan Bautista Grau Solé (1876–?) was a fencing teacher at the Solé Gymnasium and one of the most prominent Spanish fencers of the early 20th century. Another one of his brothers was named José and was a prominent doctor in Barcelona.

== Sporting career ==
=== FC Barcelona ===
Football began taking root in Barcelona in the 1890s, and soon it gained followers among the local youth, including Solé, who started to practice this new sport at the Velódromo de la Bonanova with some friends and gym co-workers. In the spring of 1895, football in Barcelona was already played by several junior and senior teams, which included several Catalans, such as Solé, the Busquet brothers (Guillermo and José Antonio), and Alberto Serra. They also played a few games for the Barcelona Football Society in 1895 and 1896, and after the club's collapse, he continued to play football with the Club Regatas team.

As a friend of Joan Gamper, Solé closely witnessed the founding of FC Barcelona on 29 November 1899, which took place in the Gimnasio Solé, being one of three figures present in this historic meeting who were not among the 12 official founding members, the others being Josep Elías and Narciso Masferrer, who had the headquarters of his numerous initiatives domiciled in the gym. Elías and Solé became members of the club just a few days after its foundation, and while the former went on to play three friendlies, the latter only played two, both as a defender, and both in 1900, helping his side to a 3–1 win over Català FC on 23 September, while the second ended in a 1–4 loss to Hispania AC on 2 December, thus becoming the first player from the Tarragona area to play for the club. (Note: The Great Dictionary of Barça Players, published by FC Barcelona, attributes six unofficial games played between 1900 and 1907 to Manuel Soler, a footballer for whom there was no biographical data until recently. Therefore, for several decades, many historians believed that it could be Manuel Solé, whose surname would have been incorrectly written in the chronicles of the time, given the phonetic similarity of both surnames in Catalan. Throughout the 2010 and 2020s, however, historians discovered that there was indeed another family linked to the early years of FC Barcelona named Soler, which was made up of Manuel and his brother Joan, who played as a goalkeeper for Barça between 1903 and 1907, as well as a certain Francisco Soler, who owned both the Tibidabo restaurant and the Gran Continental restaurant, with the latter hosting the delivery of the trophy of the 1901–02 Copa Macaya, Barça's first-ever piece of silverware.)

In addition to being player, he was also a vice secretary of the board of directors chaired by Walter Wild between 17 October and 30 December 1900, the day in which the board not only replaced him with Fernando Blanco, but also granted the title of "Honorary Members" to several partners, including Gamper and his uncle Francisco Solé due to his decisive contribution to the birth of the club. After living Barça, he joined city rivals Català FC, with whom he played two friendly matches against Barça on 8 and 29 December 1901, which ended in heavy losses (4–1 and 8–0). Later, during the presidency of Otto Gmeling (1909–10), he served as the club's first member. It was a board that was very respectful of the club's origins since Masferrer was the vice president and Gamper the treasurer.

In 1924 Solé was one of the guests of honor at the banquet that commemorated the Silver Jubilee of FC Barcelona.

=== Sports manager ===
Solé was also a friend of Bernat Picornell, with whom he founded the Club Natació Barcelona, a pioneering entity in the practice of swimming and water polo in Spain, which was established on 10 November 1907 at the Gimnasio Solé in 1907, just like FC Barcelona eight years before. He was vice president of the club and promoted the first Spanish Championship of swimming. He was also the creator and president of the Solé Pedestre Club, in 1909.

In January 1910, Solé took over from his uncle as director and owner of the Solé Gym. In 1914 he closed the old premises to open a new one a few meters away, on Pintor Fortuny Street, no. 2, under the name Solé Physical Culture Center. Representatives of the local press and one councilor were invited to the event, who did the honors of the house, together with Cercos, the doctor of the establishment, and Grao, professor of the Sala de Armas (weapons room). The guests visited all the first and second-class bathroom departments, luxuriously installed, the Weapons Room, which was very elegant and spacious, as well as the Gymnasium hall, where lunch was served, with all those present expressing their wishes for the prosperity of the establishment. The architects of this establishment were Antonio Ventura, master builder; José Preckler, smokers, boilers and pipes; Orsola Sola y Inc, mosaics; Lacoma brothers, bathtubs, toilets and sinks; Ramón Solé, furniture maker; Fargas and Buxaderas, carpentry, and Franzi brothers, marbles; the works were directed by the renowned architect Juan Casado.

== Death ==
Solé died in Barcelona on 7 May 1934, at the age of 61. His nephews Gustau Griñó and Maria Contell, along with cousins and other relatives, asked their friends and acquaintances to keep Solé in their prayers and to attend the funeral a few days later and to accompany the corpse to the parish church and from there to the Old Cemetery.

== Bibliography ==
- VVAA (2015). Gran diccionari de jugadors del Barça [Great dictionary of Barça players]. Barcelona: Base. ISBN 978-84-16166-62-6.
