= Nemesi Ponsati =

Spanish pharmacist and sports leader

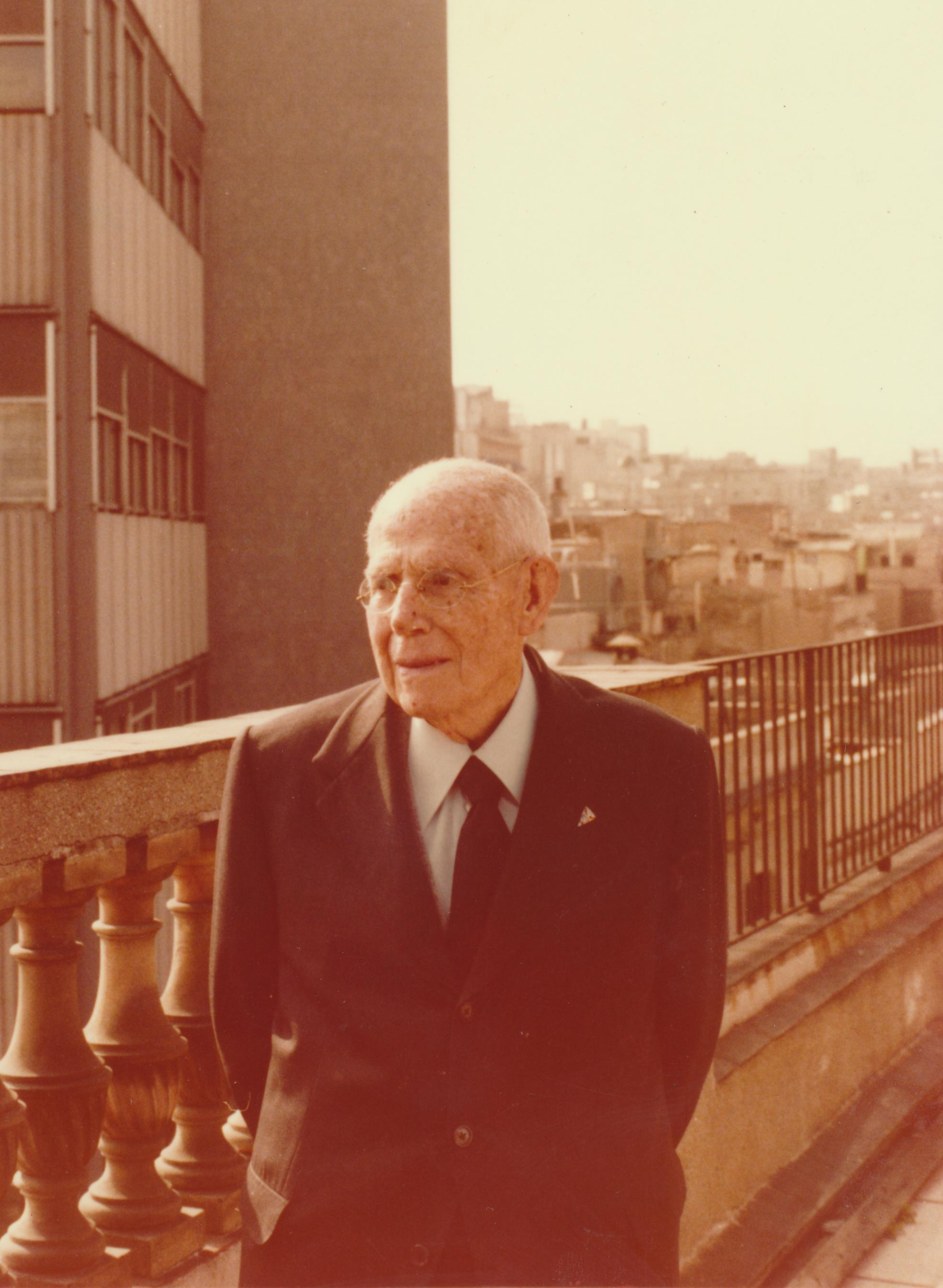
- Ponsati in 1980
- Born: Nemesi Ponsati i Solà; 26 June 1887; Barcelona, Catalonia, Spain
- Died: 18 April 1980 (aged 92); Barcelona, Catalonia, Spain
- Citizenship: Spanish
- Occupation(s): Pharmacist, Pedagogue, and Sports leader
- Known for: President of the Club Natació Barcelona

2nd President of the Catalan Swimming Federation
- In office 1922–1923
- Preceded by: Jaume Mestres
- Succeeded by: Joaquim Rosich

President of the Club Natació Barcelona
- In office 1939–1943

President of the Catalan Athletics Federation
- In office 1 May 1949 – 31 March 1953
- Preceded by: Pere Ricart
- Succeeded by: Fernando Serrano Misas

Nemesi Ponsati Solà (26 June 1887 – 18 April 1980) was a Spanish pharmacist, pedagogue, and sports leader who served as the president of several sporting entities, such as the Catalan Swimming Federation (1922–23), the Club Natació Barcelona (1939–1943), and the Catalan Athletics Federation (1949–1953). He was one of the most important figures in the sporting world of Catalonia during the 20th century, first as an athlete, and later as an educator and leader.

== Early life ==
Nemesi Ponsati was born on 26 June 1887 in Barcelona, as the son of Josep Ponsatí i Pagèsesperes (1852–1931), and Isabel Solà i Vila, who had a bakery at Calle Carme number 7.

He is the uncle of Maria del Carme Ponsasti and Roser Ponsati, as well as the great-uncle of Clara Ponsatí and Agnès Ponsati.

== Sporting career ==
Educated at the Joan Bardina Teachers' School, Ponsati, inspired by the Noucentisme ideals of his youth, dedicated himself to promoting sports and education in Catalonia. He began his sporting journey at the Vila Gymnasium, owned by Jaime Vila, where he practiced Swedish gymnastics and athletics.

In 1916, the 29-year-old Ponsati joined the Club Natació Barcelona (CNB), where he not only practiced water polo and swimming, but also athletics, which he incorporated into the club by established its athletics section in 1922, which was one of the first in Barcelona, and its subsequent rivalry with the athletics section of FC Barcelona, which remained until the 1960s, played a pivotal role in the development of Catalan athletics. Also in 1922, he replaced Jaume Mestres as the new president of the Catalan Swimming Federation, a position that he held for just a year, until 1923, when he was replaced by Joaquim Rosich. During his mandate, he participated in the process of creating the Sports Confederation of Catalonia (1922) as well as in Barcelona's frustrated candidacy to organize the 1924 Olympic Games.

After the Spanish Civil War ended in 1939, Ponsati revived the CN Barcelona, being its president from 1939 to 1942, during which time he promoted the creation of a track next to the beach for the practice of athletics. In 1949, Ponsati replaced Pere Ricart as the new president of the Catalan Athletics Federation, a position that he held for four years, until 1953, when he was replaced by Fernando Serrano Misas. When he left the presidency he dedicated himself to pedagogical work and the promotion of grassroots athletics, training future great athletes for many years. Outside sports, he was a pharmacist.

== Death and legacy ==
Ponsati died in Barcelona on 18 April 1980, at the age of 92.

Furthermore, the Catalan Athletics Federation set up a trophy that bears his name, the so-called Trofeu Nemesi Ponsati, which has been held every year at the Estadi Municipal Joan Serrahima since 1990. Nine years after his death, on 18 April 1989, the City Council of Barcelona named a square after him, which is located in the Olympic Ring, right in front of the main entrance to the Montjuïc stadium. When the Montjuïc stadium was being rebuilt for the 1992 Olympic Games in Barcelona, three were several requests for a change of name, with RCD Espanyol suggesting Juan Antonio Samaranch, while veteran athletes from Catalonia requested that of "Nemesio Ponsati", but in the end, it was named after Lluís Companys, the first minister of the Catalonia autonomous region during the Civil War.
