= José Rosich =

Spanish football manager and sports leader

Personal information
- Full name: José Rosich Rubiera
- Birth name: Josep Rosich Rubiera
- Date of birth: 14 February 1884
- Place of birth: Barcelona, Catalonia, Spain
- Date of death: 23 September 1960 (aged 76)
- Place of death: Caldes de Malavella, Catalonia, Spain

Managerial career
- Years: Team
- 1924: Spain (12)
President of the Catalan Football Federation
In office 1919–1920
Preceded by	Josep Germà
Succeeded by	Josep Julinès
President of the Catalan Football Federation
In office 1926–1929
Preceded by	Ricardo Cabot
Succeeded by	Josep Sunyol

José Rosich Rubiera (14 February 1884 – 23 September 1960) was a Spanish sports leader who presided over the Catalan Football Federation in two stages (1919–20 and 1926–29) and also a football Manager who co-directed one match of the Spanish national team in 1924. In the 1920s he was also treasurer of the Spanish football federation and part of the board of directors of FC Barcelona in 1923–24. He was the brother of the sports leader in the field of swimming, Joaquim Rosich Rubiera.

== Biography ==
Born on 14 February 1884 in Barcelona, Catalonia, Rosich presided over the Catalan Football Federation between 1919 and 1920, and again between 1926 and 1929, being its representative in the Spanish federation in the 1930s. On 22 January 1929, the assembly of the Catalan Federation, which was chaired by Rosich, met and agreed to request to the Spanish Federation that, on the occasion of the 1929 Barcelona International Exposition, the Spain v England football match and the FIFA Congress would also be held in Barcelona; they only achieved the latter. The Congress was naturally attended by a Spanish delegation, which was formed by Rosich, Julián Olave, and Ricardo Cabot, and its most important point was the discussion of the regulations of the upcoming inaugural FIFA World Cup, and Spain was the first to withdraw its candidacy to donate support to Montevideo, the "most Spanish city among all the Spanish capitals of South America".

In the 1920s, Rosich was also treasurer of the Spanish football federation and, as a member of its national committee, a triumvirate made up of himself, Olave, and Luis Colina, he provisionally served as national coach in a match against Austria held at the Camp de Les Corts on 21 December 1924, which ended in a 2–1 victory thanks to goals from Antonio Juantegui and Josep Samitier.

Rosich was also part of the board of directors of FC Barcelona in 1923–24, under the presidency of Enric Cardona.

In 1932, Rosich was one of the effective patron members of gas employer entities.

== Death ==
Rosich died on 23 September 1960, at the age of 76.
