= Joaquim Rosich =

Spanish water polo player and sports leader

- Born: Joaquim Rosich Rubiera; 1895; Barcelona, Catalonia, Spain
- Died: 29 October 1953 (aged 57–58); Barcelona, Catalonia, Spain
- Citizenship: Spanish
- Occupation(s): Water polo player and sports leader
- Known for: President of the Catalan Swimming Federation

3rd President of the Catalan Swimming Federation
- In office 1923–1927
- Preceded by: Nemesi Ponsati
- Succeeded by: Francisco Gibert

7th President of the Catalan Swimming Federation
- In office 1933–1939
- Preceded by: Tomás Palmada
- Succeeded by: Antonio Vila Mayans

President of the Spanish Swimming Federation (Republic Zone)
- In office 1937–1939

Joaquim Rosich i Rubiera (1895 – 29 October 1953) was a Spanish water polo player and sports leader who served as the president of the Catalan Swimming Federation on two occasions, from 1923 to 1927, and again from 1933 to 1939. His brother, José Rosich, was also an outstanding sports leader, but in the sport of football.

== Early life ==
Joaquim Rosich was born in 1895 in Barcelona, as the son of the lawyer and judge Joaquim Rosich i Guardiola (1846–1926), who was mayor of Vila de Gràcia, and Josepa Rubiera i d'Armas (1862–1909), from Nuevitas, Cuba.

== Sporting career ==
He began his sporting career at CN Barcelona, where he became a swimmer and water polo player, being a member of the club's water polo team that participated at both the 1920 and 1928 Summer Olympic Games. After retiring from swimming, he began working as a judge and timekeeper, and eventually, he became a member of CNB's board of directors, on whose behalf he assumed the presidency of the Catalan Swimming Federation in August 1923 at an assembly held in Sant Feliu de Guíxols, a position that he held for four years, from 1923 to 1927, when he was replaced by Francisco Gibert. Following the sudden death of Tomás Palmada, Rosich was once again named president of the Catalan Federation, and this time he held the position for six years, until 1939, when he was replaced by Antonio Vila Mayans. In September 1937, in the middle of the Spanish Civil War, he was elected as president of the Spanish Swimming Federation in the republican zone, which means that Rosich was the last president of both the Spanish and the Catalan Swimming Federations before the Franco dictatorship. He was later named as an honorary member of the water polo referees' association.

He was also a member of the Hiking Club of Catalonia and a member of the Physical Culture Advisory Committee of the City Council of Barcelona in 1934.

== Death ==
He married Rosario Riu, and the couple had three children, Juana, Joaquín, and Eulalia. Rosich died in Barcelona on 29 October 1953, at the age of 58.
