= Rusich =

Rusich (Russian: Русич) may refer to:

- Rusich Group, a paramilitary unit within the Russian far-right Wagner Group
- Rusich Podolsk, an ice hockey team in Podolsk, Russia
- Metro wagon 81-740/741 Rusich, a type of rolling stock used in several Russian metro systems
- Stellina Rusich, Canadian actress, e.g., in the TV series Monk

== See also ==
- Rusic
- Rusić
- Rosich, a surname
- Rosić
- Russian Imperial Movement
- Sparta Battalion
