= Francisco Gibert =

Spanish water polo player (1900–1979)

Personal information
- Nationality: Spanish
- Born: 12 July 1900; Barcelona, Spain
- Died: 4 September 1979 (aged 79); Barcelona, Spain

Sport
- Sport: Water polo

Francisco Gibert (12 July 1900 – 4 September 1979) was a Spanish water polo player. He competed at the 1920 Summer Olympics and the 1924 Summer Olympics.
