= Joan Roca i Caball =

Catalan Carlist and Christian-Democratic politician

- Born: Joan Roca i Caball; 1898; Barcelona
- Died: 1976 (aged 77–78); Barcelona
- Occupation: insurance agent
- Known for: politician
- Political party: CT, UDC

Joan Baptista Roca i Caball (1898–1976) was a Catalan Carlist and Christian-Democratic politician. He is known as co-founder of Unió Democràtica de Catalunya and recognized as representative of a "Third Spain", the group which emerged during the Spanish Civil War and claimed to have stood in-between the warring factions. He is also counted among leaders of the Catalan opposition to Francoism.

== Family and youth ==
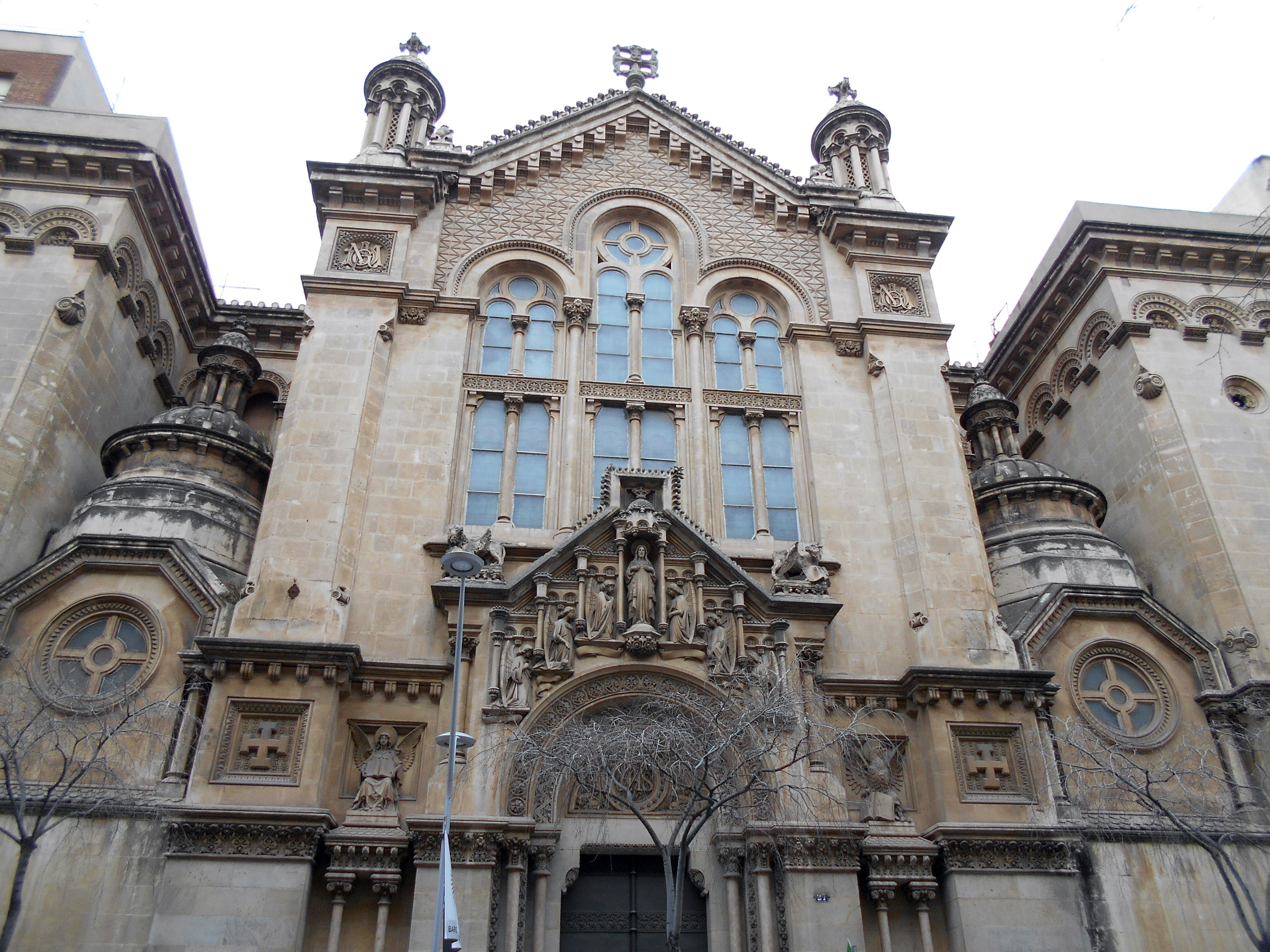
Colegio de Caspe

The Roca family has traditionally owned vineyards in the Barcelona province; heavily hit by the phylloxera plague in the mid-19th century, it was driven out of business. Joan's paternal grandfather, Antonio Roca Calvet (1840-1917), inherited nothing but clothes and had to build his position in mid-ranks of the Barcelona bourgeoisie, the task facilitated by his marrying into an established Masferrer family. His son and Joan's father, Ramon Roca Masferrer (1861-1932), became a prestigious personality within the realm of Barcelona editors, arts and culture. He is best known as co-founder and one of the key people behind Instituto Catalán de las Artes del Libro (also known as Societat de les Arts del Llibre), an organization of Barcelona publishers; he was member of its managing board. Apart from typical corporative activities Instituto managed a school and published reviews and other prints itself, contributing in particular to development of the Catalan graphical art. Roca Masferrer was also engaged in charity, active in Centro Benéfico Social Parthenon and Centro Católico Obrero, the interest passed later on to his offspring. He married María Baus Rocabruna, with whom he had 3 children. Widowed in 1894, in 1895 he married María Caball Fargas (1862-1938); the couple settled in the university quarter at the intersection of Rosellon and Aribau streets; they had two children, Joan and Trinidad.

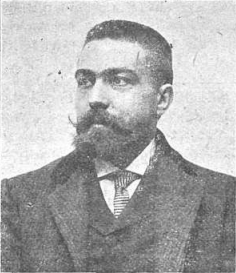
Miguel Junyent

The young Joan received his first education in the very prestigious Barcelona Jesuit college known as Colegio de Caspe; he entered the school in 1908 and received his bachillerato in 1914. The same year he entered Faculty of Law at the University of Barcelona, where he joined as unenrolled student. During his studies he worked in an unnamed "oficina comercial" and practiced law as an intern in the office of Salvador Ariza and in the civil section of the municipal court of the Hospital district, where he served as a secretary. Brought up in fervently Catholic ambience, he also engaged in lay Catholic and charity organizations, like congregations of Sant Joan Berchmans and the Immaculada, acting as a catechist in the nearby Centre Montserrat-Xavier. The exact year of his graduation is unclear, though in 1921 he is known as already pursuing a law career on his own. In 1923 he married Montserrat Junyent Quintana (1905-1985), daughter of Miguel Junyent Rovira, the leader of Catalan Carlism and editor-in-chief of the daily El Correo Catalan. The couple had 7 children, 5 daughters, and 2 sons. One of them, Miquel Roca i Junyent, was active in anti-Francoist opposition and made his name nationwide as a moderate Catalanist politician; he is one of the fathers of the 1978 Spanish constitution. Apart from being a scholar, he is also heading a major law firm, considered one of the most influential ones in Spain. Montserrat Roca Junyent was distinguished figure in the realm of Catalan librarians and archivists.

== Carlist ==
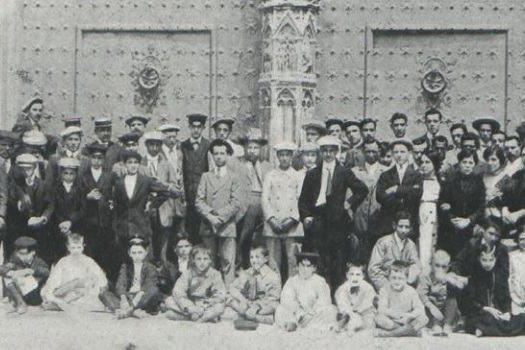
Catalan Carlist youth, 1912

Joan's father sympathized with possiblist republicanism and moderate Catalanism; approaching Unió Catalanista, he was member of the local Centre Catalá Autonomista, which later adhered to Lliga Regionalista. Joan's maternal ancestors were distinguished by loyalty to the ultra-reactionary Carlist cause. It was the influence of his mother and maternal relatives, especially his older cousin Joan Viza Caball, which prevailed when forming the young Joan; as a teenager he engaged in the mainstream Carlist branch, at that time known as Jaimismo. Around 1914 he joined the local Circulo Jaimista at calle de la Puertaferrisa. During his academic years he entered the local branch of Agrupación Escolar Tradicionalista, the Carlist student organization. In the early 1920s he was already one of the most dynamic regional party activists of the young generation, becoming member of Junta Directiva of the local circle, secretary of Junta Regional Tradicionalista of Catalonia and president of the Barcelona AET.

The 1923 coup of Primo de Rivera produced dissolution of all parties and brought national political life to a standstill. With Jaimist structures dormant Roca turned towards non-political Carlist activities and commenced co-operation with the Catalan party daily. As Correo Catalan was managed by his father-in-law, Roca became first secretary of the editorial board and later started to contribute himself. He specialized in commentaries on foreign politics; as his position grew, in the mid-1920s he started to write editorials; he usually signed as "Daniel Castells" and "Snomen". Junyent was known for his moderate sympathy for Catalanism and at that time also Roca's Carlism was assuming an increasingly pro-Catalan tone, though he did not join those who abandoned the movement to join Acció Catalana. His original Traditionalist vision was diluted further on by social-Catholic threads, as he approached Acción Social Popular and its periodicals. His charity engagements were gradually turning him against the regime; forming the circle of Josep Pedragosa Monclús he focused on prison inmates and became member of the Barcelona Junta del Patronato de las Prisiones.

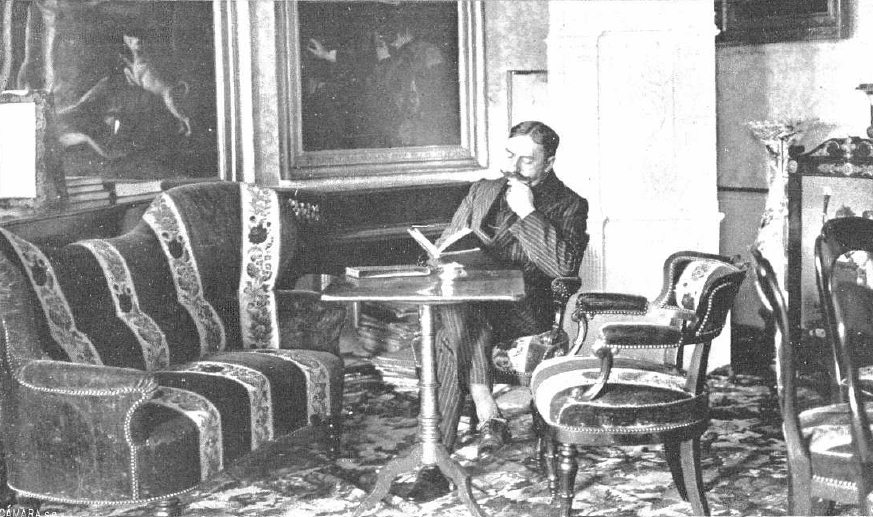
don Jaime

In the late 1920s Roca formed part of an informal Jaimist nationwide network known as "La Protesta"; some scholars claim that together with Melchor Ferrer and Pedro Roma he led the Barcelona cell. Formed mostly by the youth, the grouplets engaged in conspiracy against the regime. Its format emphasized mobilization and search for wider social basis rather than anti-primoderiverista activities, though at one point the Barcelona hotheads considered staging a coup in La Seu d'Urgell. "La Protesta" was somewhat at odds with generally passive policy of the Carlist executive though not necessarily with position of the claimant; since 1926 openly opposing Primo, in his Paris residence Don Jaime remained in touch with the Catalanist and liberal exiles. During Berenguer's dictablanda, Roca decided to actively re-enter official politics; in the last elections of the monarchy in April 1931 he co-ordinated party campaign in the Tarragona province and unsuccessfully tried his luck as a Traditionalist candidate to the local Sarrià council.

== Between Carlism and Christian Democracy ==
Carlist standard

After the fall of Alfonsine monarchy and declaration of the Second Spanish Republic Roca held high position within Carlist structures; he was member of the Catalan party executive, Junta Regional, serving as its secretary. During gear-up to the Cortes Constituentes electoral campaign of June 1931 he negotiated with the conservative Catalanist La Lliga about building a right-wing alliance list in the region. Together with Francisco Gambús and Juan Soler Janer, Roca was one of 3 Carlists forming a joint Carlist-Lliguist candidature; he competed in the Tarragona district. The bid bore no fruit and Roca suffered heavy defeat; with the leading contender getting 67.000 votes and the last candidate elected earning 22.000 votes, Roca enjoyed support of only 9.000 voters.

The question of Basque and Catalan autonomy, which occupied much of the public agenda in the summer of 1931, proved a difficult one for the Carlists. Though supporting separate traditional provincial establishments has always been a fundamental part of their program, they were anxious that autonomy might turn into a vehicle of promoting peripheral nationalisms and left-wing ideologies. The original highly federative Carlist draft of Catalan autonomy, produced in 1930, was shelved; the move prompted frustration of highly pro-Catalanist Carlists; disappointed, Roca resigned from the posts held. Though eventually the Carlists half-heartedly decided to support the official autonomy scheme, Roca concluded that his vision of Catalan future was no longer compatible within the Traditionalist format.

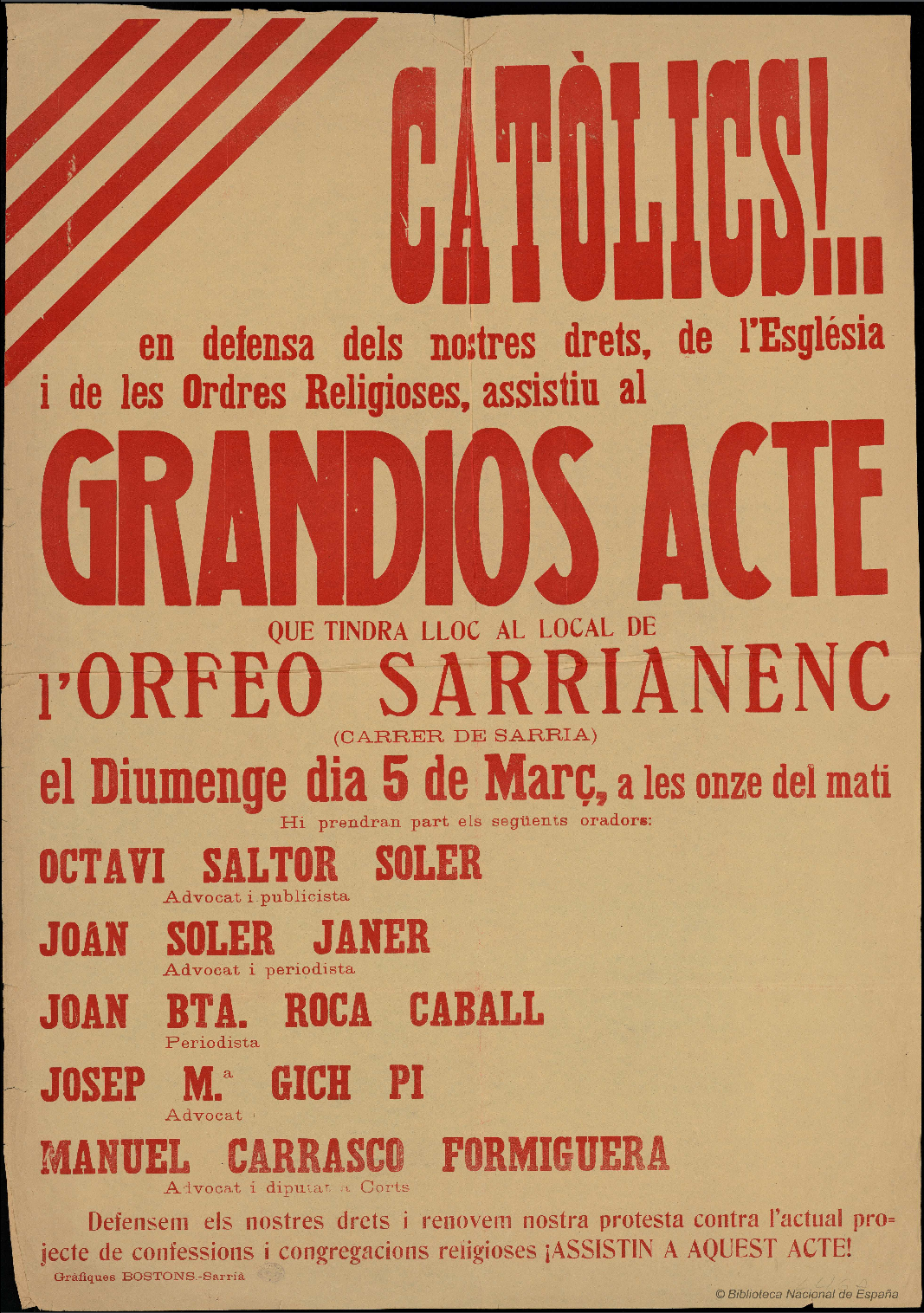
Roca announced as a speaker at a Catholic meeting (1933)

Together with a group of young Carlists Roca got in touch with offshoots from Acció Catalana and encouraged by his old-time mentor, a Capuchin friar Miquel d'Esplugues, in November 1931 he co-founded Unió Democrática de Catalunya. Along Josep Cirera Soler and Lluis Vila d'Abadal he was among those most responsible for its manifesto; it identified UDC as a Christian-democratic party advocating Catalonia within the future Iberic Confederation. The move marked a dramatic rupture with Traditionalism; instead of its ultra-reactionary, monarchist, antidemocratic, fanatically Catholic outlook, Roca accepted the Republican regime, democratic principles and a democristiano format of religiosity. Scholars consider his approach non-sectarian, conciliatory and moderate. Roca entered top executive bodies of UDC and emerged as one of its 3 key personalities.

In the 1932 campaign to Catalan parliament UDC underlined 4 features: loyalty to the Republic, support for autonomous Catalonia, social-Catholicism and the principle of religious freedom, the last one somewhat at odds with militantly secular course of the Republic. The party strove to build a broad-base center coalition named "Concòrdia ciutadana"; for reasons which are not clear, Roca did not run, though he was one of the most active party speakers. In general elections of 1933 Unió refused to join the CEDA-led right-wing block and attempted to mount another moderate alliance, but negotiations with La Lliga failed. UDC fielded a stand-alone list with 4 candidates, including Roca, in the Barcelona Ciudad district. All of them lost and 2.700 votes gathered by Roca demonstrated that the party was a second-rate grouplet, with membership reduced to few thousand.

== The Third Spanish Republic ==
Catalan standard

While the country was undergoing rapid political polarization Roca and UDC tried to keep off what they considered extremes. Having earlier dismissed CEDA as an alliance partner, during talks preceding the 1936 electoral campaign Unió rejected also the offer of Companys, which consisted of few places on the Catalan Frente Popular list; they claimed that Christians could not join the Marxists. Eventually, UDC did not field any candidates. Until the July 1936 coup Roca kept advocating Christian Catalanism, though when discussing threats he stressed a fascist menace rather than a proletarian revolution. After outbreak of the Civil War the party remained loyal to the Republic. When in August the Generalitat security launched their search of Roca, result of confusing different members of the family, he volunteered to Commisaria General d'Ordre Públic and was detained for 2 weeks. Released, he concluded that remaining in the increasingly chaotic Republican zone posed a mortal threat; he resigned from public functions and in December 1936 the entire family, escorted by the Generalitat police, crossed the French frontier. They settled in Paris; in financial dire straits, Roca tried to earn a living by teaching Catalan.

In February 1937 Roca co-founded Comité pour la paix civile et religieuse en Espagne and became its secretary. The organization posed as representing "Tercera España", siding with none of the warring parties and mobilizing international support for truce based on mutual compromise. As back in Spain UDC remained loyal to the Republic and even recruited its own party volunteer battalion, to sustain his "Third Spain" identity Roca distanced himself from ongoing party activities. In practical terms, the Comité endorsed a democratic republic deprived of militant secularism; it spoke against European non-intervention in favor of "intervenció mediadora". In April 1938 the Comité produced an own armistice draft; later it was increasingly focusing on humanitarian issues. Roca remained active and indeed animated a number of likewise initiatives, e.g. similar committees in other countries or separate Comité Catala per a la Pau Civil i Religiosa. However, he was not among leaders of Comité d'action pour la paix en Espagne, an initiative deprived of the confessional ingredient. It is not clear whether he visited the Republican zone. Serrano Suñer in name of the Franco government named his efforts "maquinaciones" and declared him "separatista".

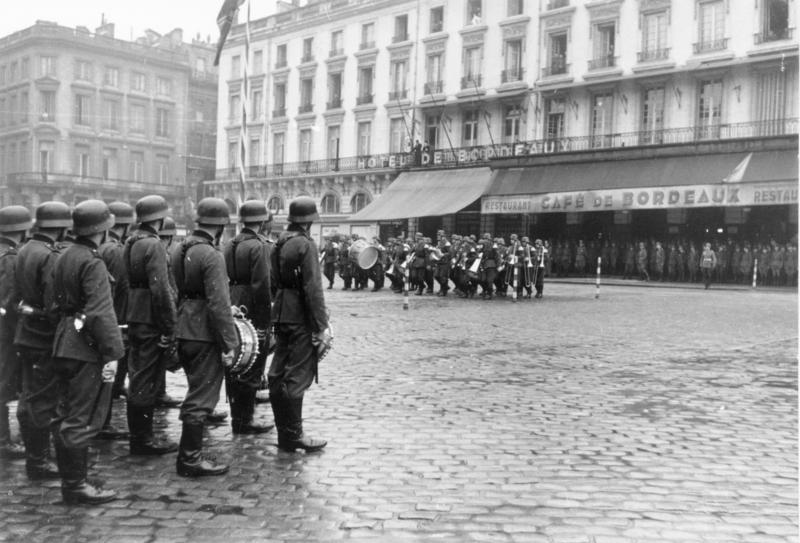
Wehrmacht in Bordeaux, 1942

After the end of hostilities Roca's public activity was reduced to organizing assistance for refugees from the Republican zone, massively fleeing into France; none of the sources consulted claims he was engaged in political activities of the Republican exiles. In late 1939 the Roca family - still in difficult financial conditions - moved away from Paris and settled in Bordeaux, where they were offered hospitality in a house of distant family relatives, the building left entirely at their disposal. In late 1940, already after the city had been occupied by the Germans, his wife and two children transferred to Spain. As she developed serious health problems, Roca decided to take the risk and join her; in May 1942 he returned to Barcelona.

== Early Francoism ==
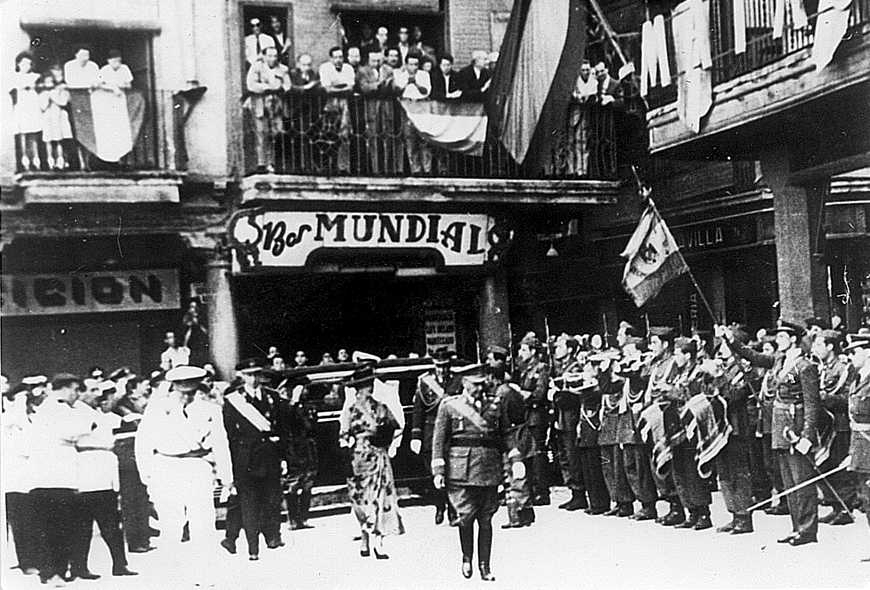
early Francoism in Catalonia

Upon return Roca was questioned by the security. Released, he was required to show up at a police station periodically, the obligation lifted some time afterwards. Taking advantage of his pre-war connections with Catholic activists now highly positioned in business, he commenced working for insurance companies like La Previsión Española, Compañía Hispano-Americana de Seguros y Reaseguros and Compañia de Seguros Cervantes. His business role is not clear; a later police document identified him simply as an insurance agent. Due to his corporate engagements in the mid-1940s Roca lived permanently outside Catalonia, mostly in Bilbao, San Sebastián and Madrid; he settled at Carrer de Madrazo in Barcelona as late as in 1946. Continuing with insurance engagements, at that time he also entered the managing board of Fosforera Española.

Having returned to Spain Roca joined UDC members acting in secrecy under circumstantial names, like Creus de Sang. Some scholars count him, along Miquel Coll i Alentorn, Pau Romeva and Maurici Serrahima, as one of the party leaders. Their strategy consisted of staying clear of official political life, focusing on elites, marketing cultural orientation of Catalan nationalism and playing the Catholicism card. Activity of the group was very much formatted as cultural and scientific initiatives, usually associated with the re-created Instituto de Estudios Catalanes; Roca became vice-president of the associated Sociedad Catalana de Estudios Jurídicos, Economicos y Sociales. They also assumed religious shape; Roca was on friendly terms with many members of the Spanish ecclesiastical hierarchy and with some in the Vatican. A few of these enterprises turned into major public events, like the 1947 enthronement of the Montserrat Virgin. Conducted partially in Catalan, it endorsed the spirit of post-war reconciliation; though refraining from anti-Francoist tones, the event proved to have been a hard test for the official authorities.

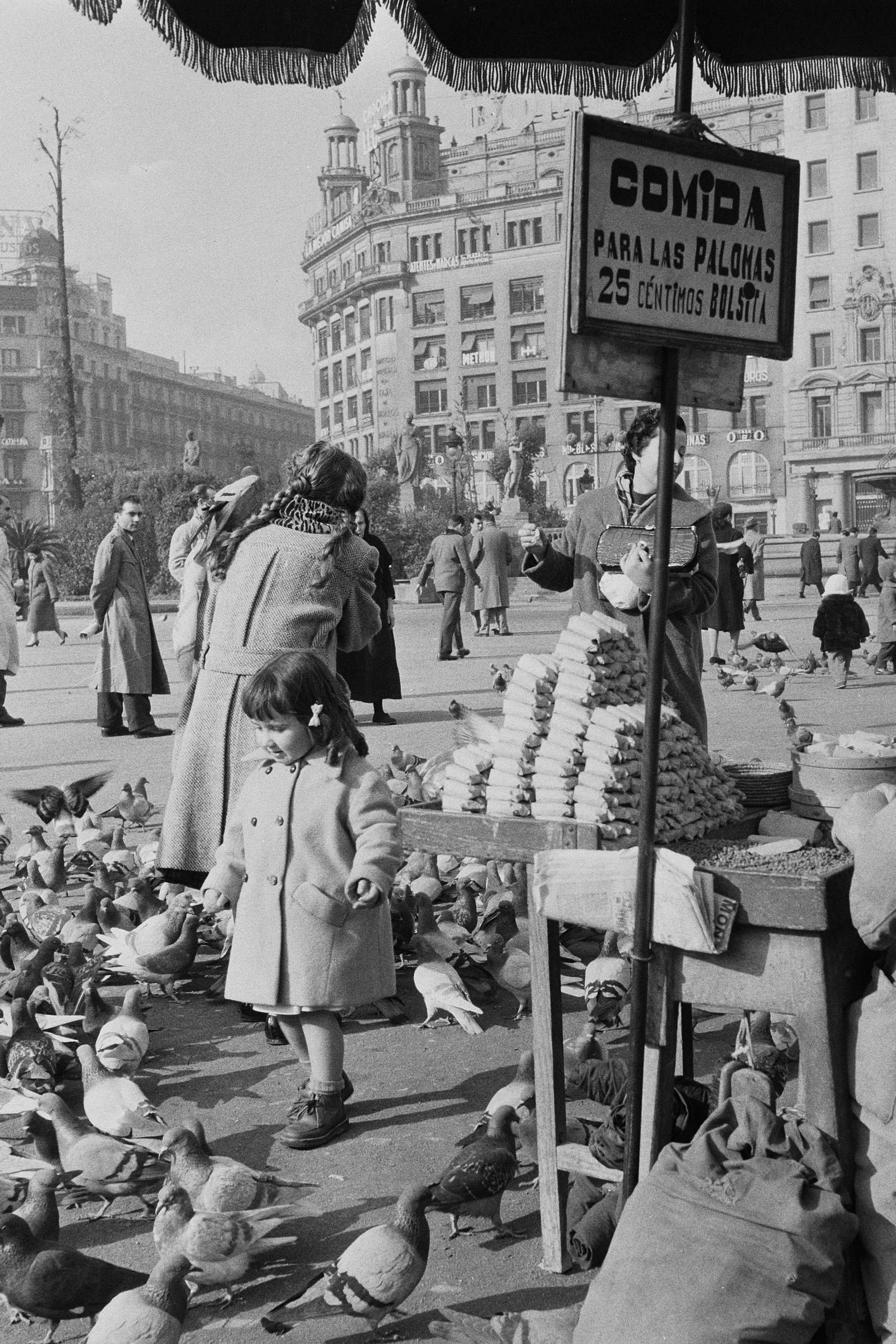
Barcelona, mid-1950s

In the 1950s UDC resumed more structured clandestine organizational life. With theoretically supreme governing body Consell Nacional meeting once a year, it empowered Commissió Permanent - Roca its member - to act in-between the sessions. Since 1945 allowed to travel abroad Roca became active in the world of European Christian Democracy network; in 1950 UDC applied for membership in Nouvelles Equipes Internationales, later Union européenne des démocrates-chrétiens. His role on the international arena was made easier as Roca knew many European democristianos from Secretariado Internacional de los Partidos Democráticos de Inspiración Cristiana and remained within the circle of Maritain's followers. The 1952 Eucharistic Congress, staged in Barcelona, turned into a major success of the UDC activists; working extensively to prepare its agenda, Roca persuaded ecclesiastical hierarchs to drop pro-Francoist tones. Security services of the regime were aware of his activities, though he was spared heavy repressive measures; once briefly detained, he was questioned by the police also in few other cases. On the other hand, in the mid-1950s he already enjoyed a fairly prestigious status in the Barcelona societé, acknowledged by official press in the "sociedad" columns.

== Middle and late Francoism ==
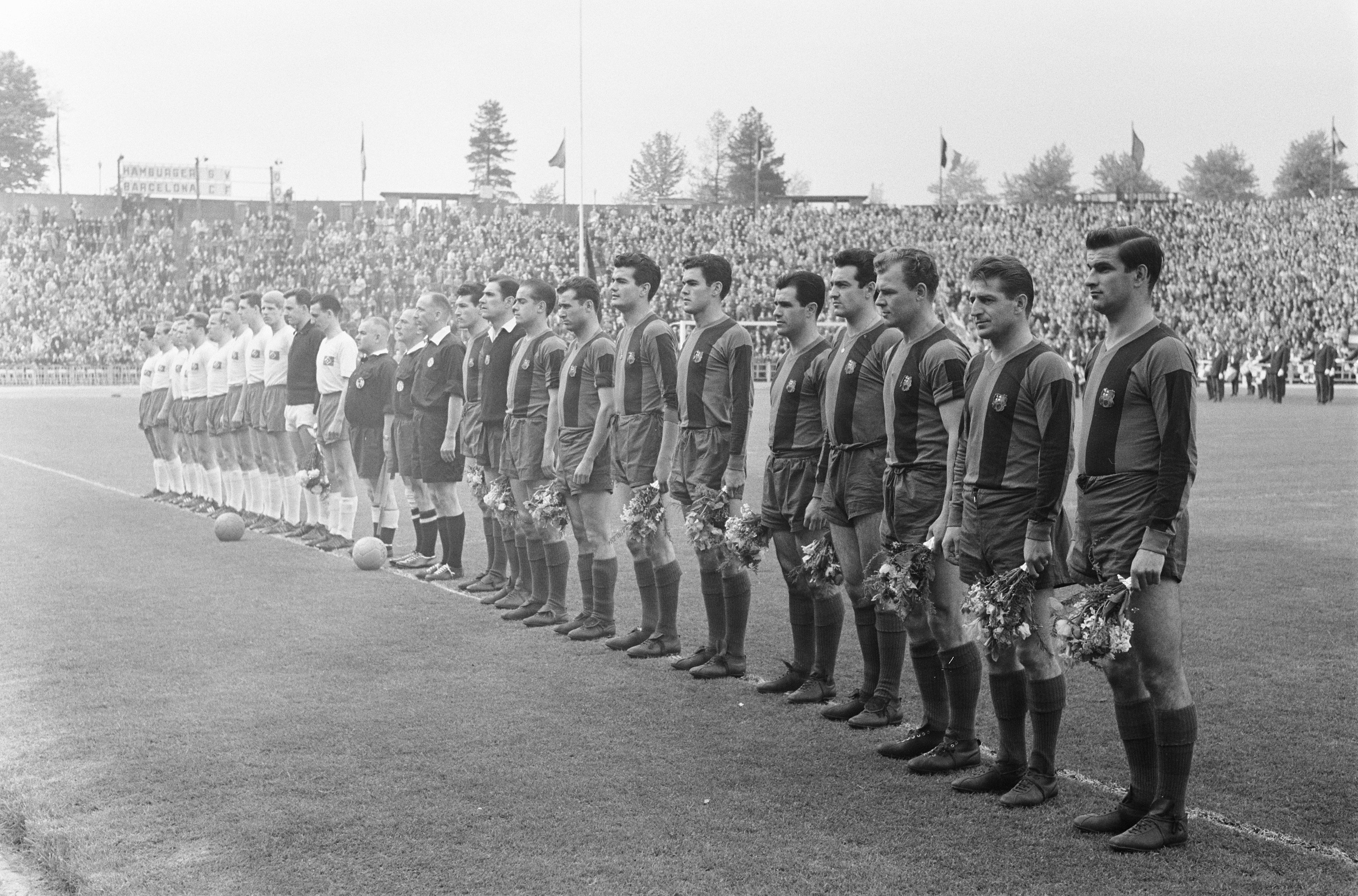
CdF Barcelona, 1961

In the late 1950s UDC was in impasse; Roca is credited for overcoming the crisis. As the regime assumed more liberal shape, at the turn of the decades the UDC activists took to more open forms of activity. In the early 1960s they launched new periodicals, either on clandestine or semi-clandestine basis. Roca himself focused on collaboration with Criterion, an official Barcelona-based Catholic review with Christian-democratic and pro-Catalanist penchant; on the other hand, he stayed clear of more fundamentalist Christian reviews like Cristianidad, also issued in the Catalan capital. He was among most active "conferenciants", giving lectures which promoted Catalan and Christian values. Initially delivered privately, gradually they were hosted also by various institutions. Roca himself was the most frequent guest at the Barcelona Franciscalia, though he promoted Catalan culture also at unlikely locations like sport circles. Since the 1960s he started to sign open letters, protesting suppression of Catalan culture, crackdown on student groupings and measures against the dissenting clergy; in the mid-1960s he joined the "Volem Bisbes Catalans" campaign. On the list of suspects, maintained by the Francoist security, he was classified as "catalano-separatista".

Active in the fields of charity, culture and religion, Roca earned most prestigious position in the realm of Catalan sport. Though not a sportsman himself, already in the mid-1930s he grew into the presidency of Federación Catalana de Fútbol and became secretary general of the football club FC Barcelona. Due to his sensitive political standing he was not in position to resume the duties during initial decades of Francoism, but in the early 1960s he re-entered the executive of Mutua del C. de F. Barcelona. In 1963 he is first reported as vice-president of the already iconic Catalan club and retained this position at least until the very late 1960s; in the early 1970s he was noted as elected to Junta Directiva of the club, though not as a VP anymore.

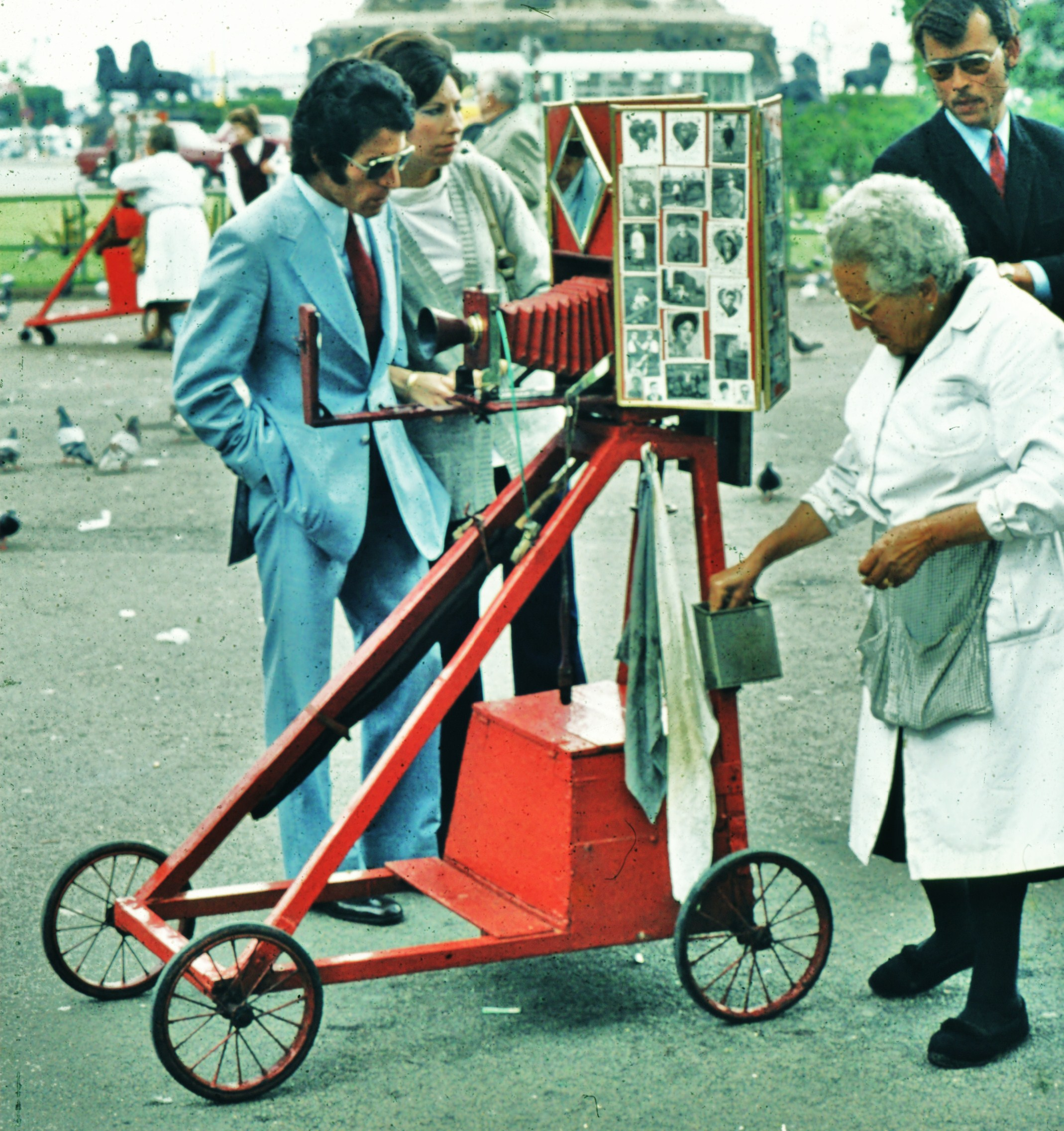
Barcelona, mid-1970s

In 1967 Roca replaced Pau Romeva as head of Commissió Permanent. This change coincided with revision of the hitherto party's alliance strategy. Though Unió recurrently defended attempts to create more unitary platforms of political opposition, it remained highly cautious about entering initiatives which hosted also parties of extreme left; under the new Roca leadership UDC joined ranks with PSUC in Commisió Coordinadora de Forces Politiques de Catalnuya. Apart from traditional Catalanist and Christian-democratic profile, the grouping adopted also some social-democratic tones and assumed a decisively pro-EEC stand. During late Francoism UDC emerged as one of more popular Catalan groupings, its moderate Christian-democratic and nationalist profile appealing to Catalan bourgeoisie. At that time already advanced in age and suffering from deteriorating health, Roca ceded many roles to his son, Miquel. He was unable to attend the first official national congress of UDC, staged in 1976 and passed away shortly afterward due to pulmonary edema.

== See also ==
- Carlism
- Democratic Union of Catalonia
- Christian democracy
- Catalanism
- Miquel Roca
