= Rosić =

Rosić, also spelled Rosic without diacritics, is a South Slavic surname, literally meaning "Rus person".

Notable persons with that surname include:

- Dragan Rosić
- Đoko Rosić (born 1932), Bulgarian-Serbian actor
- Ivana Rosić, Serbian politician
- Lazar Rosić
- Nikola Rosić (born 1984), Serbian volleyball player
- Nina Rosić
- Varnava, Serbian Patriarch (born Petar Rosić) (1880–1937), patriarch of the Serbian Orthodox Church
- Vinko Rosić (1941–2006), Yugoslav-Croatian water polo player

== See also ==
- Rosich
- Rusich (disambiguation)
- Rosice
