= José Tarruella =

Spanish doctor and sports leader

- Born: Josep Tarruella i Albareda; 10 November 1870; Pallejà, Catalonia, Spain
- Died: 1 January 1958 (aged 87); Barcelona, Catalonia, Spain
- Citizenship: Spanish
- Occupations: Doctor; Sports leader; Author

President of the Academy of Medical Sciences of Catalonia
- In office 1910–1912
- Preceded by: Ramon Turró
- Succeeded by: Francesc Fàbregas

11th president of the Catalan Football Federation
- In office 1912–1913
- Preceded by: Normand J. Cinnamond
- Succeeded by: Josep Preckler
- Known for: President of the Academy of Medical Sciences of Catalonia

José Tarruella Albareda (10 November 1870 – 1 January 1958) was a Spanish doctor and sports leader. He presided over several sporting entities, such as the University SC, the Catalan Football Federation (1912–13), the Royal Automobile Club of Catalonia, and the Pompeya Tennis Club, among others. He also presided over the Academy of Medical Sciences of Catalonia between 1910 and 1912.

== Professional career ==
José Tarruella was born on 10 November 1870 in Pallejà, Catalonia, as the son of a director of La Manresana, a factory of explosives integrated into the Unión Española de Explosivos. As he does not like industrial activity, he instead decided to study medicine at the University of Barcelona where he received his license in 1892. Two years later, in 1894, he obtained his doctorate in Madrid. He was a disciple of Bartomeu Robert. After periods of study in France, Switzerland, Germany, and Russia, he decided to research diseases of the digestive system.

In 1893, just one year after graduating, Tarruella was an assistant professor of Clinical Medicine at the Faculty of Medicine in Barcelona. Interested in Gastroenterology, he taught the Digestive Pathology courses organized by Professor Gallart at the Hospital de Sant Pau. In the years that followed the completion of his degree, Tarruella collaborated with Ramon Turró in bacteriological studies, especially of staphylococcal and streptococcal infections. He also began investigating the malaria that was affecting the districts of Baix Llobregat. In 1904, together with Dr. Antonio Raventós i Avinyó, he founded a "Clinic for Diseases of the Digestive System" in Barcelona.

Tarruella was one of the first to use the Catalan language in the medical press. He joined the Royal Academy of Medicine of Barcelona as a corresponding member in 1896, and five years later, on 29 November 1901, as secretary of the Academy of Medical Sciences of Catalonia, he read the first act of that institution, written in Catalan, thus becoming one of the first to write and read the proceedings of the academy in Catalan. A very active member of the Association of Catalan Language Doctors, he took part in the Congresses of Catalan Language Doctors (CMBLC) in different presentations, presiding over the Fifth, held in Lleida in 1923. Likewise, he participated in the first Hygiene Congress of Catalonia.

In 1907, as secretary of the Academy of Medical Sciences of Catalonia, he was one of the founders of the journal Annals de Medicina (Annals of Medicine), of which he was director from 1907 to 1909. In 1910, Tarruella replaced Turró as the president of the academy (biennial 1910–1912), a position that he held for two years until 1912, when he was replaced by Francesc Fàbregas.

In 1931, in the first Republican collegiate elections, Tarruella was elected president of the Official College of Doctors of Barcelona (COMB). He maintained a very good relationship with the Doctors' Union of Catalonia with the aim of regulating the operation of Maternity Insurance and a project of Social Insurance for Sickness. It improved aid to orphans and contributed decisively to the Catalanization of the college.

== Sporting career ==
Tarruella was an accomplished sportsman, having been a tennis player and a driver of one of the first ten cars that circulated in the county town in addition to being the president of the Catalan Gliding Federation.

A man with an intense social life, Tarruella was a partner and promoter of several artistic, cultural, and sports organizations. For instance, he stood out as a sports leader, being the president of the University SC and the Catalan Federation of Football Clubs between 1912 and 1913, in addition to the Royal Automobile Club of Catalonia and the Pompeya Tennis Club, among other entities.

== Writing career ==
Fond of reading, he enjoyed the modernist movement of his time.

Tarruella was also an author, writing at least three books about medicine, Sobre la urobilinuria (1897), Higiene de l'alimentació (1918), and Semiologia de les ptosis digestives (1928). Years later, he collaborated in the writing of the "Corachan" Medical Dictionary, published in 1936 shortly before the outbreak of the Spanish Civil War. His work was prolific with nine monographs and more than a hundred articles and communications. After the war, he returned to Barcelona and continued to write in his retirement years. The last one, in Spanish in 1943: Renal ileus, is about intestinal occlusions due to nephritic colic.

== Others ==
Tarruella regularly attended different social events. Art and painting. He was even a member of the Amigos de la Instrucción society, the Royal Artistic Circle of Barcelona, the Liceu Circle, and the Ateneo Barcelonés.

In 1910, Tarruella was a candidate for the Republican Nationalist Federal Union in the general elections for Barcelona but he did not get the seat despite having 23,293 votes against the 16,292 votes of Francesc Cambó.

== Later life ==
Despite this intense social life, Tarruella did not refrain from deepening his knowledge of Medicine nor did he forget his patients. In addition to his frequent participation in scientific sessions and congresses that took place in the country, it was also common for him to travel to other countries. In 1997, in Moscow, he presented a paper on Peudosclerosis of plaques and, in Paris, where he often attended, in 1910, he lectured on Renal Opotherapy.

Tarruella was the general practitioner of many Barcelona families and sometimes he even acted as a family counsellor. The wealthiest, in order not to lose contact with him, accompanied him on his stays at the spas of the time.

During the Civil War, Tarruella went into exile in San Sebastiàn, where he continued to work as a doctor for some of the exiled Catalan families.

== Death ==
Tarruella died in Barcelona on 1 January 1958, at the age of 87. His funeral was quite an event in the city.

== Writings ==
- Sobre la urobilinuria (1897)
- Higiene de l'alimentació (1918)
- Semiologia de les ptosis digestives (1928).
