= Josep Ponsatí =

Josep Ponsatí (born 1947 in Banyoles) is a Catalan artist, who lives and works in Porqueres (Girona). He was formed in Barcelona and later did stays in Paris and New York, and participated in activities and group events conceptualism of Catalonia in the late 1960s. He taught at the school EINA and is particularly known for his inflatable works which are markedly ephemeral and thoughtful about the concept of landscape.
