= Concepció Tarruella =

Spanish politician (1949–2024)

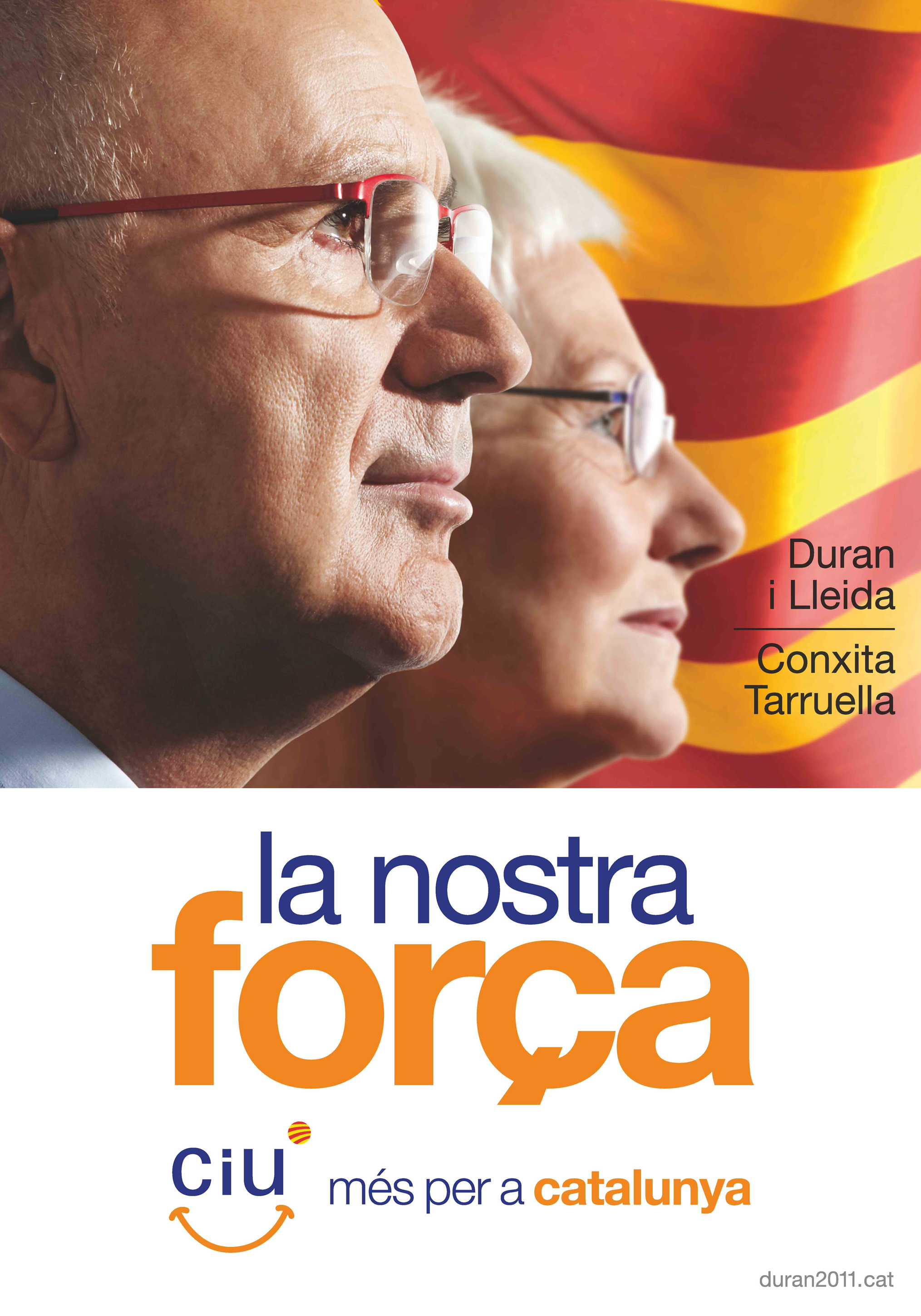
- Election poster featuring Tarruella (right)

Member of the Congress of Deputies for Lleida
- In office 18 March 2008 – 27 October 2015

Member of the Parliament of Catalonia for Lleida
- In office 30 March 1992 – 23 September 2003

Personal details
- Born: María Concepció Tarruella i Tomàs; 10 December 1949 Benavent de Segrià, Spain
- Died: 27 March 2024 (aged 74)
- Party: UDC (until 2017); Els Units (2017–2024)
- Occupation: Nurse

María Concepció Tarruella i Tomàs (10 December 1949 – 27 March 2024) was a Spanish nurse and politician. A member of the Democratic Union of Catalonia and later United to Advance, she served in the Parliament of Catalonia from 1992 to 2003 and in the Congress of Deputies from 2008 to 2015.

Tarruella died on 27 March 2024, at the age of 74.
