= Catalan Football Federation =

Football association in Catalonia

RFEF (Spain)
- Founded: 1900
- Headquarters: Barcelona
- RFEF (Spain) affiliation: 1909
- President: Joan Soteras
- Website: www.fcf.cat

The Catalan Football Federation (Catalan: Federació Catalana de Futbol, Spanish: Federación Catalana de Fútbol; FCF) is the football association responsible for administering football in Catalonia. It was formed on 11 November 1900 as the Football Associació de Catalunya (English: Football Association of Catalonia). It was the first football association founded in Spain. The first president was Eduard Alesson and the original members included FC Barcelona, Català FC, Hispania AC and Sociedad Española de Football.

Between 1903 and 1940, the federation organised the Campionat de Catalunya, the first league championship ever played in Spain. Since 1904, the federation has also organised the Catalonia national football team.

Today, the federation continues to organise its own club competition, the Copa Catalunya. It also administers Lliga Elit and the subsequent lower tiers within the Spanish football league system, and the Catalonia amateur football team which represents those leagues in regional competitions.

== Presidents ==
- 1900–1904: Eduardo Alesson
- 1904–1905: Josep de Togores
- 1905–1906: Josep Soler
- 1906: Udo Steinberg
- 1906–1908: Isidro Lloret
- 1908–1909: Juli Marial
- 1909: Rafael Degollada
- 1909–1910: Alberto Serra
- 1910–1911: Eugenio Beltri
- 1911–1912: Normand J. Cinnamond
- 1912–1913: José Tarruella
- 1913: Josep Preckler
- 1913: Francesc de Moxó
- 1913: Narciso Masferrer
- 1913–1914: Narcís Deop
- 1914–1915: José Maria Tallada
- 1915: Ricardo Cabot
- 1915–1916: Joaquim Peris
- 1916–1918: Gaspar Rosés
- 1918–1919: Josep Germà
- 1919–1920: José Rosich
- 1920–1921: Josep Julinès
- 1921–1922: Josep Soto
- 1922–1923: Josep Buchs
- 1923–1926: Ricardo Cabot
- 1926–1929: José Rosich
- 1929–1930: Josep Sunyol
- 1930–1931: Josep Plantada
- 1931–1934: Francesc Costa
- 1934–1936: Joan Baptista Roca
- 1936–1937: Ramon Eroes
- 1937–1939: Josep Guàrdia
- 1939–1940: Francesc Jover
- 1940–1945: Javier de Mendoza
- 1945–1946: Agustin Pujol
- 1946–1947: Francisco Sáinz
- 1947: Ramon Capdevila
- 1947–1950: Agustin Pujol
- 1950–1953: Agustin Arañó
- 1953–1954: Francisco Giménez
- 1954–1956: Agustin Pujol
- 1956–1957: Narcís de Carreras
- 1957: Ramon Capdevila
- 1957–1961: Francisco Román Cenarro
- 1961–1964: Antonio J. de Capmany
- 1964–1975: Pablo Porta
- 1975–1989: Antonio Guasch
- 1989–2001: Antonio Puyol
- 2001–2005: Jaume Roura
- 2005: Josep Maria Vallbona
- 2005–2009: Jordi Roche
- 2009–2011: Jordi Casals
- 2011–2018: Andreu Subíes
- 2018–present: Joan Soteras
