= Josep Sunyol =

Spanish lawyer, journalist and politician

22nd President of FC Barcelona
- In office 27 July 1935 – 10 July 1936
- Preceded by: Esteve Sala
- Succeeded by: Management committee

Personal details
- Born: Josep Sunyol i Garriga; 21 July 1898 Barcelona
- Died: 6 August 1936 (aged 38) Sierra de Guadarrama
- Party: Esquerra Republicana de Catalunya (ERC)
- Occupation: Lawyer, journalist, politician

Josep Sunyol i Garriga (21 July 1898 – 6 August 1936) was a Catalan lawyer, journalist and politician from Spain. He was president of FC Barcelona, a prominent politician for the Esquerra Republicana de Catalunya (ERC), and ERC deputy in the Congress of Deputies in 1931, 1933 and 1936.

== Life ==
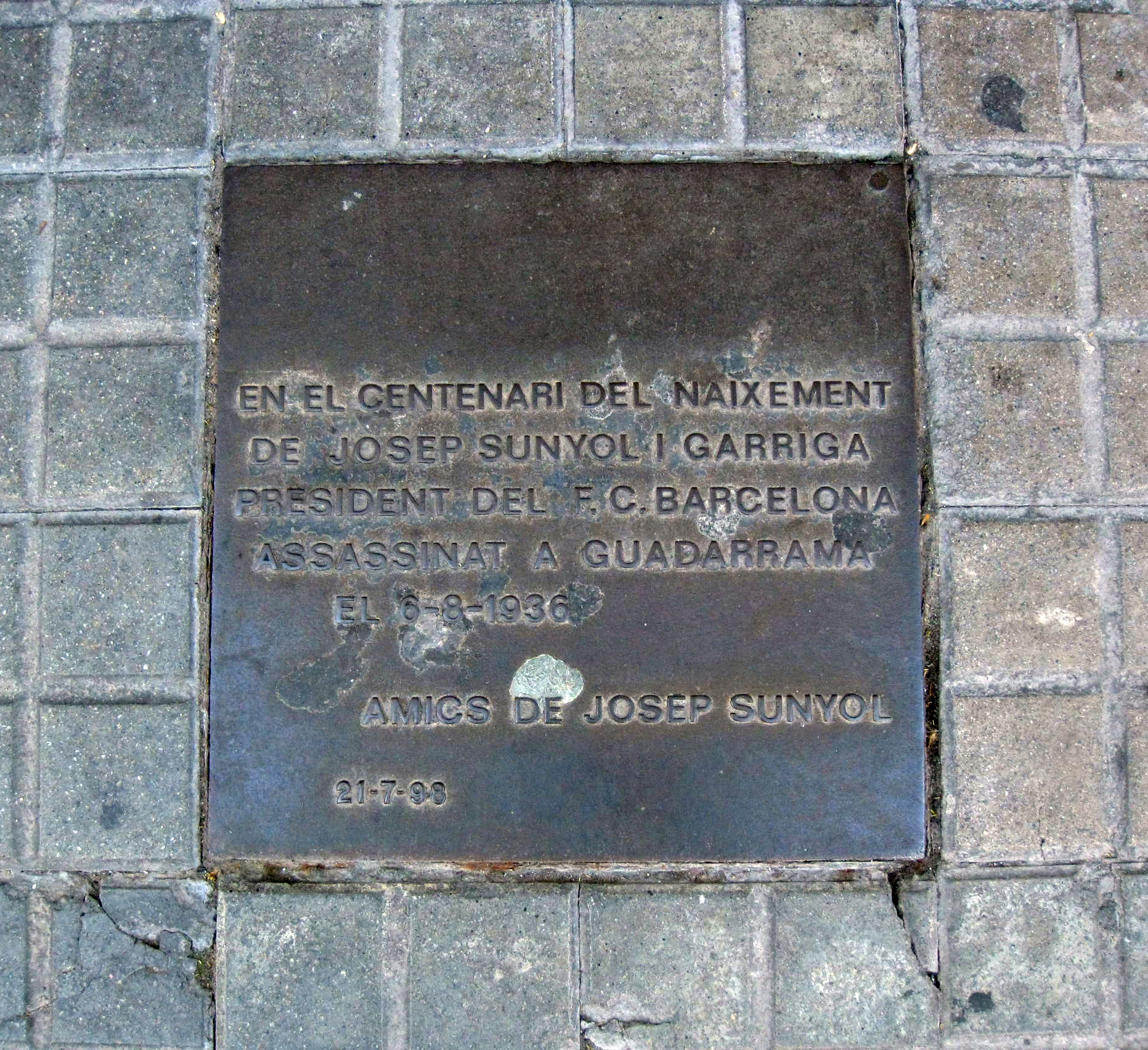
Plaque commemorating the centenary of his birth, at La Rambla, 133, Barcelona.

Sunyol came from both a wealthy family and a long line of Catalan political militants. He was a member of Acció Catalana, a left-wing group and Esquerra Republicana de Catalunya.

In 1928 he became a director of FC Barcelona, and in 1930 he founded the left-wing newspaper La Rambla, which opposed the Primo de Rivera regime. In 1931 he was elected to the Cortes as an ERC deputy. He was subsequently re-elected in 1933 and 1936.

He served as president of both the Reial Automòbil Club de Catalunya and the Federació Catalana de Futbol. In 1935 he was elected president of FC Barcelona.

== Assassination ==
On 6 August 1936, during the early days of the Spanish Civil War, Sunyol was arrested by rebel troops in the Sierra de Guadarrama and was then murdered. A memorial stone to Sunyol was placed in a park near the location where he was killed, and Sunyol is now described as 'the Martyr President' by FC Barcelona.
