= Olympic Committee of Catalonia =

National Olympic Committee

- Country: Catalonia
- [[|]]
- Created: 1913 (restored in 1989)
- Headquarters: Barcelona
- President: Gerard Esteva
- Secretary General: Xavier Vinyals

The Olympic Committee of Catalonia (Catalan: Comitè Olímpic de Catalunya, abbreviated COC) is a currently unrecognized National Olympic Committee who tried to organize the direct representation of Catalonia in the Olympic Games and other sporting events related to it. Nowadays, the COC continues to defend its official recognition by the International Olympic Committee (IOC).

== History ==
The first Olympic Committee of Catalonia was founded in 1913 in order to participate in the 1916 Olympic Games of Berlin, but only existed during a brief period. In 1922 it was founded the Sports Confederation of Catalonia, seen as heir to the now defunct Catalan Olympic Committee and was chaired by Joan Ventosa i Calvell. The Confederation did not use the word "Olympic" because of the reluctance of the IOC to recognize an entity outside of international institutions. In 1923, however, it received the Olympic Cup in recognition of its work in promoting sport. However, during the dictatorship of Primo de Rivera (1923-1930) the Confederation lost most of its functions.

In 1987, shortly after the election of Barcelona as host city of the 1992 Summer Olympics, it was created the Association for the Olympic delegation of Catalonia, which established on 29 May 1989 the Olympic Committee of Catalonia. After decades frozen and forgotten, in October 2016, during the process of self-determination of Catalonia, its directive council met in order to approve new statutes of the organization, as the originals were still the ones of 1989, clearly obsoletes. The goals of this changes are: restore the activities of the COC, adapt it to legislative changes in international sport of recent decades and prepare it for eventual international recognition in case of independence of Catalonia. Gerard Esteva, president of the UFEC, was elected as new president of the committee.

The committee has faced the opposition of relevant Catalan people linked to the Olympic movement like Juan Antonio Samaranch and international ones like Coubertin.

== See also ==
- Catalonia national football team
