= 1924 Olympics =

1924 Olympics may refer to:

- The 1924 Winter Olympics, which were held in Chamonix, France
- The 1924 Summer Olympics, which were held in Paris, France
