= Narciso Masferrer =

Spanish journalist and businessman

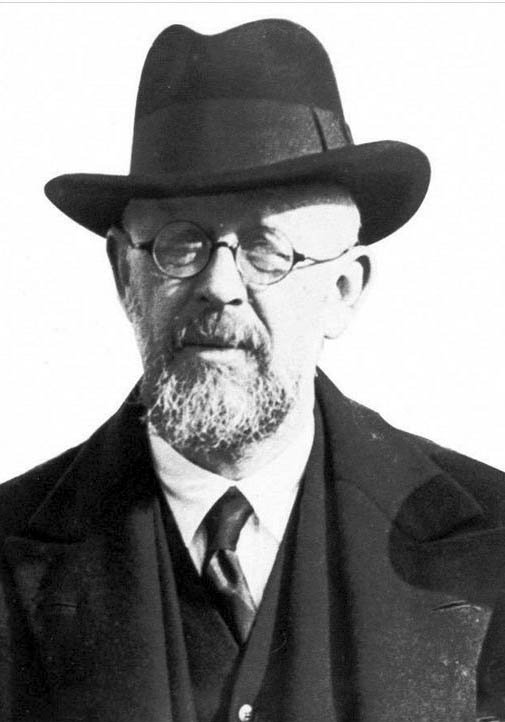
- Born: Narcís Masferrer i Sala; 26 April 1867; Madrid, Spain
- Died: 9 April 1941 (aged 73); Barcelona, Spain
- Citizenship: Spanish
- Occupations: journalist; businessman
- Known for: Founder of Spanish Federation of Gymnastics El Mundo Deportivo and Los Deportes

FC Barcelona
- In office 1909–1910

14th President of the Catalan Football Federation
- In office 1913–1913
- Preceded by: Francisco de Moxó
- Succeeded by: Narcico Deop

Narciso Masferrer Sala (26 April 1867 – 9 April 1941) was a pioneer of Catalan sports, sports journalism, and Olympism throughout Spain. He was present at most Catalan sports initiatives of the first third of the 20th century, founding and becoming director of a number of sporting projects, including some of the greatest sporting institutions in Catalonia, such as clubs, federations and sports press.

As a pioneer of sports journalism, he was the founder of Los Deportes, El Mundo Deportivo and "Stadium" magazines, a correspondent for the French publication L'Auto and an editor of La Vanguardia for 17 years, from 1912 to 1929. He is thus widely regarded as the father of modern sports journalism in Spain. In the press, his activity was basically centered on the creation of innovative journalistic projects and the promotion of sporting activity among citizens, preferably outdoors. From the various journalistic forums that he founded or directed, he had a decisive influence on the dissemination and institutionalization process of multiple sports modalities, from gymnastics to football, passing through motor racing, swimming, athletics, and cycling.

He was Spain's first sports promoter with a global and ambitious vision, and the first person who was clear about the need for national organizations for each sport, as well as federations for each national championship. Masferrer is widely regarded as one of the most important figures in the amateur beginnings of gymnastics and football in Spain, as he was the fundamental head behind the foundation of Spanish Gymnastic Federation in 1898, which acted as the Spanish football federation until 1909. He also left a big mark in cycling, holding the presidency of the Unión Velocipédica Espanyola in 1911, from which he promoted the creation of the Volta a Catalunya, the first cycling race per stage in Spain and one of the oldest in the world. He was also a prominent member of the Spanish Olympic Committee and the main inspirer and promoter of the pre-Civil War Barcelona candidatures to host the Olympic Games.

He is also known for his pivotal role in the founding of FC Barcelona, publishing Joan Gamper's famous advert in the Los Deportes magazine to find players interested in forming a football team, and then hosting the famous meeting at the Gimnasio Solé on 29 November 1899 that saw the birth of the club, of which he was a vice-president from 1909 to 1910, and he even held the presidency of the Catalan Football Federation in 1913.

== Biography ==
=== Early years ===
Masferrer was born in Madrid in 1867 to Catalan parents and studied in France and Germany. Masferrer married Esperanza Navarro in Madrid in July 1891, at the age of 24, and both he and his very young wife suffered from tuberculosis, a disease that wreaked havoc at that time. As an employee of the Deutsch Compañía de Petróleos y Derivados, his bosses decided to send him to the company's Seville branch in hopes that the change of scenery would benefit his precarious health. While there, he had two children: Ana (1892–1940) and Narciso, who died a few days after birth. He lived in Seville for four years until 1896, when professional reasons forced him to move to Barcelona, the city in which he would live most of his life.

=== First projects ===
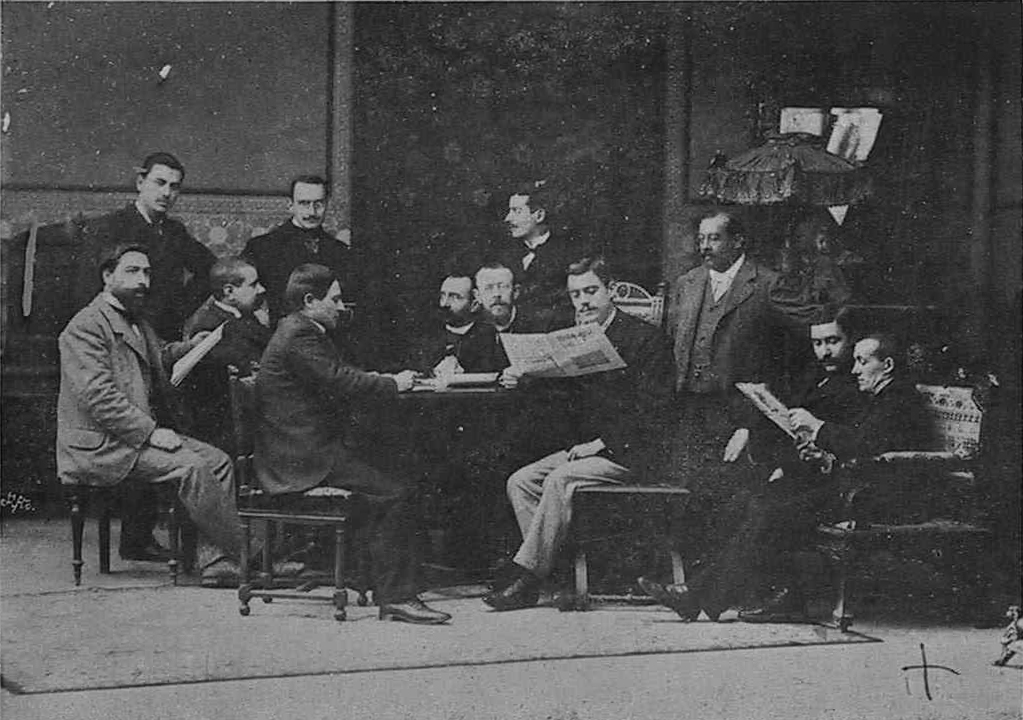
Redaction of Los Deportes in 1898 with its director, Narciso Masferrer in the center, looking at the camera.

His work as a journalist began in 1886, when he was still living in Madrid, with the newspaper El Imparcial, and a year later, on 2 March 1887, the 20-year-old Masferrer founded the Sociedad Gimnástica Español (SGE) together with Emilio Monjardín, Emilio Coll and Eduardo Charles. But it was not until the end of 1896, now living in Barcelona, and coinciding with the death of his wife, that his journalistic hyperactivity set off. Having narrowly survived tuberculosis, he now wanted to fully take advantage of the second chance that life gave him, and thus, after mourning his wife, he threw himself into a hectic informative and associative activity. It was most likely due to his own health problems, caused by tuberculosis, and the premature death of his wife, as well as his concern over the well-being of his children, that influenced his obsession with healthy living and the regeneration of the Spanish people. In 1897, the 30-year-old Masferrer founded the Catalan Gymnastics Association and the fortnightly magazine Los Deportes, directing the latter from the Solé Gymnasium on Montjuïc del Carme street. This publication, which ceased to be published in 1910, would become, throughout its life, the official organ of several entities, such as the Royal Association of Hunters of Barcelona, the Catalan Federation of Football Clubs, the Spanish Cycling Federation, and the Spanish Gymnastic Federation.

I know from my own experience—I accuse myself of this with bitter pain—what it is to be a dissident, and I know what it leads to, just as I know what remorse means. Since then, I condemn any manifestation of desertion, as betrayal of the goals that an entity pursues (...) since then, I have fought and will fight (...) to create and maintain entities of a national nature.

— Narciso Masferrer in 1910.

At the beginning of 1898, Masferrer used Los Deportes, which he had founded the year before, to became the main propagandist of the Catalan Cycling Union (Spanish: Unión Velocipédica Catalan or UVC), chaired by the doctor Manuel Duran i Ventosa, who created this entity to compete with the Madrid-based Spanish Cycling Union (Spanish: Unión Velocipédica Española or UVE), which is now the Spanish Cycling Federation. When this entity was officially constituted in May of 1898, Masferrer was elected its “publicist secretary”. Years later, in 1910, when Masferrer was already an established leader of Spanish cycling, he would make a public confession of his remorse for having supported a dissident entity. At the beginning of 1899, however, both the UVC and the UVE stood on the verge of collapse as a result of Spain's colonial disaster at the end of the Spanish–American War, and when a debacle in the UVE was sensed, Masferrer immediately began to apply for union, promoting the merger between the two federations through the pages of Los Deportes and through negotiations between the leaders of both entities. This campaign reached its peak with a meeting at the restaurant Ca l'Anguilero in Llobregat, convened by Los Deportes on 9 April "to seal the union that exists among all", which was attended by more than 240 cyclists. Despite his best efforts, however, Masferrer was unable to prevent the aforementioned debacle of the UVE (May 1899), which resulted in the annulment of their meeting and the resignation of the Madrid committee from the Spanish union. From this moment on, Masferrer became the leader of the movement to save the UVE, always using the pages of Los Deportes to speak, and following an appeal on 11 June, Masferrer held a negotiation with the president of the UVE, Claudi de Rialp, and the president of the Catalan committee of the Spanish Union, the architect Bonaventura Pollés, which lead to the seizure of federative power by these men and the transfer from the headquarters of the UVE to Barcelona, which materialized at the beginning of July 1899. This entire situation gave Masferrer a triumphant entry into the unionist movement, profiling himself as the true savior of the UVE through his efforts and his journalistic campaigns. At first, he remained in the background, behind Rialp and Pollés, but he soon came to the front. In fact, some of the most important decisions of the UVE congress of December 1899 are the result of Masferrer's proposals, and his growing role within the federation is immediately made clear when he is appointed delegate, that is, the spokesman for the UVE congress held in Barcelona in December 1900, before being elected the president a year later, replacing Claudi de Rialp.

On 1 March 1898, Masferrer used Los Deportes to publish an appeal to all Spanish athletes to create a "Confederation of Spanish Gymnastic Societies". A positive response resulted in a meeting in Madrid on 7 June 1898 and the Spanish Gymnastic Federation (Spanish: Federación Gimnástica Española or FGE) was born, and a first Executive Committee was provisionally appointed. When FGE was formed, its headquarters would be that of the Sociedad Gimnástica Español, also founded by him in Madrid in 1887, which meant that Masferrer, along with the other three founders (Monjardín, Coll and Charles), became members of the FGE Executive Committee, while Marcelo Sanz was named its general secretary. Although formed in 1898, the Spanish Gymnastics Federation was only officially founded on 26 September 1899, within the framework of its first General Assembly held in Madrid, therefore making the FGE the second oldest Spanish sports federation after the cycling one. As usual, Los Deportes would be its dissemination organ. In addition to the Los Deportes newsroom, the headquarters of his numerous associations were also based in the Solé Gymnasium, which become one of the first gym members of FGE.

Although gymnastics occupied a priority place in FGE's objectives (as the name of the entity suggests), the federation's actual ambitions included all sports, such as athletics, football, and practically all other sports, with only cycling, sailing, and shooting having federative or pseudo-federative structures of its own at this time. This is why in its beginnings the FGE acted as the Spanish Football Federation. Moreover, it also acted as the Spanish Olympic Committee long before the foundation of the Spanish Olympic Committee in 1912. As the former, FGE organized some of the first football tournaments in the history of Spanish football. Therefore, Masferrer's influence on the institutionalization process of Spanish sport was omnipresent in its yearly years. However, the FGE eventually began to decline, and around 1904 this society seems to disappear. Two years later, in 1906, Masferrer, among other people, lamented the disappearance of the Spanish Gymnastic Federation in the pages of Mundo Deportivo. It was not until June 1932, at the initiative of the Spanish Gymnastics Society, that the current Spanish Federation of Gymnastics (Spanish: Federación Española de Gimnasia or FEG), still known simply as the Spanish Gymnastics Federation, was established.

=== Co-founding FC Barcelona ===
In 1899 Joan Gamper and his friend Walter Wild arrived at the Solé Gym and they were well received by Masferrer, and on 22 October 1899, they published Gamper's famous advert in Los Deportes declaring his wish to form a football club. Masferrer helped Gamper and Wild to consolidate FC Barcelona because he and his closest collaborators from the Gymnastic Federation considered football as the sport that had the best chance of hatching among that generation of Barcelona gymnasts, reaching that conclusion after doing different tests and trials with other outdoor sports such as gouret (the current hockey) or riscat (current children's rescue game). That is why the first Barcelona clubs were born in gyms and under the protection and encouragement of characters linked to the Spanish Gymnastic Federation such as Masferrer. On 29 November 1899, Masferrer attended the founding meeting of FC Barcelona, which was hosted by him at the Solé Gym, and he recounted in detail the development of the historic meeting in an article published in this newspaper on 29 November 1924, on the occasion of the 25th anniversary of the creation of the club. Without the work of Masferrer laying the foundations and helping consolidate Gamper's work, FC Barcelona might never have existed, leading some to regard him as the true founder of the club, or that at least, he should also be treated as one. Officially, however, the journalist from Madrid, not even when he was vice president of the club in the 1909–10 season.

=== Golden years ===
In 1902 he founded Vida Deportiva and became a correspondent for the French magazine L'Auto. Four years later, in 1906, he founded and directed El Mundo Deportivo, becoming its first director, and in its first editorial, published on 1 February, Masferrer pointed out the conduct that needed to be followed by the newspaper, which did not differ at all from his own: "We do not come to criticize anyone, we come to applaud and encourage everyone". 1911 was remarkably prolific for Masferrer: he founded the magazine "Stadium", of which he was director until 1922; promoted and presided over the Union of Sports Journalists, and presided over Unión Velocipédica Espanyola, the predecessor of the Catalan Cycling Federation, where together with Miguel Artemán and Jaime Grau, he promoted the creation of the Volta a Catalunya, the first cycling race per stage in Spain and one of the oldest in the world. He had already held several federative charges and assignments at Unión Velocipédica Espanyola before 1911, including the Vice Presidency (1900–1902), the presidency (1902–1904), General Secretary (1905–1909), and he held the presidency for a third time in 1939. It was from all of these positions that he promoted all the key initiatives in the history of Spanish cycling before the Spanish Civil War. He presided over the Catalan Football Federation in 1913, and in that same year, he intervened in the creation of the Catalan Olympic Committee (Comitè Olímpic Català), and in the reorganization of the Spanish one. He promoted the construction of the La Foixarda stadium, inaugurated in 1921. He was the promoter of Barcelona's candidacy to host the 1924 Olympic Games, and was the head of the Spanish Delegation that attended the 1928 Olympic Games. He was a member of the Spanish Olympic Committee in 1926, and again in 1939, when the civil war ended. In 1929 he resigned from his job as sports editor of the newspaper La Vanguardia to dedicate himself to the organization of the 1929 Barcelona International Exposition, promoting and leading the initiative of building the Montjuïc Olympic Stadium. In 1919 he will also be appointed general secretary of the Automobile Show and will preside over all the Saló de Barcelona that were held in the now-defunct Pavilion of Fine Arts between 1919 and 1935, being stopped due to the outbreak of the Spanish Civil War.

=== Spanish Civil War ===
Shortly after the 1936 coup, Republican militiamen showed up at his home located at 41 Rambla de Catalunya, to shoot him down, due to his right-wing and monarchist political affiliation, due to his leading role in Barcelona public life as a result of 40 almost uninterrupted years of sports journalism, and due to his social position, linked to the wealthy classes through his lifetime position as general secretary of the Automobile Show of Catalonia. However, those who were going to arrest him recognized Masferrer as the leader of the Spanish sports movement, and more specifically as the maximum promoter of cycling, and thus they ended up sparing his life in his capacity as "president of the bicycles". Other Catalan sports leaders of right-wing significance had much less luck, such as Jaime Alsina and his son, who were shot dead at their gym.

== Later life ==
In 1939, at the end of the civil war, he was appointed councilor of the National Sports Council and member of the Spanish Olympic Committee. All the Spanish sports federations became run by the military, the only exceptions were cycling, run by Narciso Masferrer, and tennis, which was in the hands of José Garriga-Nogués. Throughout his life he received numerous honors and recognitions, and was awarded the title of Knight of the Order of Alfonso XII. In 1940 he was struck down by tuberculosis and was told by doctors his chances of living were slim. He died in Barcelona on 9 April 1941 at the age of 73.

== Legacy ==
Masferrer had all the levers in the hands of Spanish sport for half a century.

— Ramón Torres in 1968.

There have been many people who, on several occasions, have asked that a street or sports facility be named after Masferrer. The construction of Palau dels Esports de Barcelona in 1955 caused José Sabater Rosich to write in an article entitled "Moment opportune to repair an oblivion", published on 12 July, in which he advocated giving this street the name of a forgotten leader and sports journalist: Narciso Masferrer. In this way, it would be fulfilled "with a debt that Barcelona owes to those who propelled sports with enthusiasm and success". Sabater's proposal did not succeed. In recognition of its promoter, and although without success, Francisco Canto Arroyo led a campaign in the press in 1944, for the Montjuïc Stadium to be called the Masferrer Stadium.

In 1969 the Organizing Committee of the International Motor Show, an organization that Masferrer helped to found, established the 'Narcís Masferrer' journalistic award in his honor. In his memory, the Trofeo Masferrer was held annually in Catalonia from 1932 until 1994.
