= Ricardo Ruiz Ferry =

Spanish sports leader

President of the FECF
- In office May 1913 – September 1913
- Preceded by: Juan Padrós
- Succeeded by: Francisco García Molinas

Personal details
- Born: 1879; Spain
- Died: 28 February 1956 (aged 76-77); Madrid, Spain

Ricardo Ruiz Ferry (1879 – 28 February 1956) was a Spanish author sports journalist, and sports leader, who served as president of the Federación Española de Clubs de Football (FECF) in 1913, the forerunner of the Spanish Football Federation.

== Sporting career ==
=== Early career ===
Ruiz Ferry began his career as a sports reporter for the Spanish newspaper El Heraldo, being noted for his prominent role in promoting football in the press.

In 1912, Ruiz Ferry published a book titled Las luchas greco romanas :historia, reglamentos, anécdotas y comentarios ("Greco-Roman wrestling: history, regulations, anecdotes and comments").

=== President of FECF ===
As a sports journalist, Ruiz Ferry followed closely the conflict between the FECF (Federación Española de Clubs de Football) and the UECF (Unión Española de Clubes de Fútbol), both of which tried to become the representatives of Spanish football in 1913. Following the resignation of the FECF president Juan Padrós, most of the press began endorsing Ruiz Ferry as the ideal next president, describing him as a "person of energy and clear intelligence", and who "expresses himself eloquently", and also citing his notorious influence with the Madrid Urbanisation Company as well as his friendship with clubs from the north, thus being the one with "the best conditions to attract all sympathies and goodwill from the federated footballers". He was even endorsed by Narciso Masferrer himself, a very influential figure at the time, who supported him to the detriment of other colleagues, such as Emilio Coll, correspondent of Mundo Deportivo in Madrid, and José Luis Barceló, director of the sports section of El Mundo. Initially, Ruiz Ferry showed reservations about accepting the position for which he was being appointed, because he had previously advocated for the ideal that journalists should not hold office in sporting entities, having even stated that "we should be prosecutors and not actors".

In the next Assembly held by the FECF, Ruiz Ferry accepted the presidency of a new board of directors that included General Adolfo Meléndez and Antonio Bernabéu, as vice president and secretary, respectively. (Note: Some sources wrongly state this event took place in November 1911.) That same Assembly then agreed to repeat the second leg of the 1913 FECF Prince of Asturias Cup between the Center team (made up of players from Madrid FC clubs) and the North team (made up solely by Racing de Irún). The match was eventually set to take place at the end of July 1913 in Irun, with the Center team traveling accompanied by Ruiz Ferry, the then president of the FECF, and likewise, he went to Guipuzkoa in August, but only to meet in San Sebastian with representatives of the UECF, including its president Julián Olave, and the two of them eventually reached a definitive agreement to merge both federations in September, which culminated in the creation of the Royal Spanish Football Federation (RFEF) on 1 September 1913.

On 1 September 1913, he was involved in the constitutive assembly of the RFEF, which granted the honorary presidency to King Alfonso XIII, and the vice-presidency to Ruiz Ferry, who had the authority to act as the president, who had not yet been elected. Three weeks later, on 24 September, Ruiz Ferry, acting as the still non-existent president, wrote to request to be able to use the title of Real ("Royal"), which was granted to them by the king the following day.

== Sports journalist ==
Ruiz Ferry went on to become director and owner of Heraldo Deportivo, as well as head of the Spanish Olympic Committee (COE) press. On 5 October 1920, he wrote and published an article in Heraldo Deportivo in which he explained that the uniform used by the Spanish athletes at the 1920 Olympic Games in Antwerp had been designed by the CEO president Gonzalo Figueroa y Torres, and that its similarities with the flag of Belgium influenced the defeat of the Spanish football team to Belgium in the quarter-finals; he also stated that he had warned Figueroa about this similarities, but to no avail.

On 25 August 1919, Ruiz Ferry wrote and published an article on Heraldo de Madrid about Pepe Zabala, who had died recently.

== Death ==
Ruiz Ferry died in Madrid on 28 February 1956, at the age of either 76 or 77.

== Works ==
- La fiesta taurina y su urgente e inexcusable dulcificación ("Bullfighting and its urgent and inexcusable sweetening") (1931)
