= Bouvart =

Bouvart may refer to:

- An alternate spelling of the surname Bouvard
- Michel-Philippe Bouvart (1717–1787), French doctor and wit
- Tom Bouvart, figure skater paired with Coline Keriven
- Léon Bouvart, architect who designed the Palais du Mobilier Bonn Frères in Luxembourg
