= Joseph Barsalou =

Joseph Barsalou may refer to:

- Joseph Barsalou (physician) (1600–1660), French apothecary and physician
- Joseph Barsalou (businessman) (1822–1897), businessman and politician from Montreal
