= Barceló (disambiguation) =

Barceló is a Spanish and Catalan surname.

Barceló may also refer to:

- Barceló (rum), a Dominican rum brand
- Barceló Hotels, a multinational resort chain
- Barcelo (grape), a Portuguese wine grape

== See also ==
- Barsalou (surname)
