= Rafael Louzán =

Spanish politician (born 1967)

- Louzán at the 2026 FIFA World Cup final

President of Royal Spanish Football Federation
- Incumbent
- Assumed office 16 December 2024
- Preceded by: Pedro Rocha; María Ángeles García Chaves (interim)

President of Royal Galician Football Federation
- In office 19 December 2014 – 16 December 2024
- Preceded by: José García Liñares
- Succeeded by: Pablo Prieto

President of Provincial Deputation of Pontevedra
- In office 12 July 2003 – 17 July 2015
- Preceded by: Manuel Abeledo
- Succeeded by: Carmela Silva

Personal details
- Born: Rafael Louzán Abal; 21 November 1967 (age 58) Santiago de Compostela, Galicia, Spain
- Party: People's Party

Rafael Louzán Abal (born 21 November 1967) is a Spanish politician and businessman. Since December 2024, he has served as president of the Royal Spanish Football Federation. He also served as president of Provincial Deputation of Pontevedra from 2003 to 2015 and Royal Galician Football Federation from 2014 to 2024.

== Political career ==
Louzán began his political career in 1995, when he was elected deputy mayor of Ribadumia and a member of the Provincial Deputation of Pontevedra, representing the comarca of O Salnés. In 1996, he was appointed vice-president of the Deputation, and on 12 July 2003, he was elected its president, a position he held until July 2015.

In 1998, Louzán was elected organizing secretary of the People's Party in Pontevedra, and in May 2000, he became its provincial president, a position he held until 2016.

Following the 2015 local elections, Louzán was re-elected councilor of the municipality of Ribadumia. However, he lost the presidency of the Provincial Deputation of Pontevedra after the People's Party lost its majority in the deputation.

In 2015, Louzán was investigated by a court in Cambados for alleged bribery. In 2016, he resigned as provincial president of the People's Party in Pontevedra. The investigation concluded in 2018 when the Public Prosecutor's Office dropped the case after the High Court of Justice of Galicia annulled the evidence gathered during the investigation.

In 2021, Louzán was sentenced to two years in prison and was disqualified from holding public office for eight year for fraud in relation to granting €86,311 in aid to the Moraña town council for work on the football field that had already been completed. The fraud charge was overturned on appeal, and finally, in February 2025, the Second Chamber of the Supreme Court acquitted him on the charge of malfeasance.

== Administrative career ==
In 2014, Louzán was elected president of the Royal Galician Football Federation, a position he was re-elected in 2018 as the only candidate.

On 16 December 2024, Louzán was elected president of the Royal Spanish Football Federation (RFEF), after winning the election against Salvador Gomar. He inherited the presidency, after the departure of his predecessors Pedro Rocha and Luis Rubiales. As president of the RFEF, Louzán oversaw Spain's preparations for the 2030 FIFA World Cup. Additionally, during his tenure, the Spain men's national team won the 2026 FIFA World Cup.
