= Henry Beecher =

Henry Beecher may refer to:

- Henry K. Beecher (1904–1976), American anesthesiologist and medical ethicist
- Henry Ward Beecher (1813–1887), American Congregationalist clergyman
