= Royal Spanish Football Federation =

Governing body of association football in Spain

UEFA
- Short name: RFEF
- Founded: 29 September 1913; 113 years ago
- Headquarters: Las Rozas de Madrid
- FIFA affiliation: 1914
- UEFA affiliation: 15 June 1954; 72 years ago
- President: Rafael Louzán
- Website: rfef.es

The Royal Spanish Football Federation (Spanish: Real Federación Española de Fútbol; RFEF) is the governing body of football in Spain. Founded on 29 September 1913, it is based in La Ciudad del Fútbol of Las Rozas, Community of Madrid.

RFEF organizes the national cup competitions (Copa de S.M. el Rey and Supercopa de España) and administers the competition committee of the Campeonato Nacional de Liga (Primera División and Segunda División), including the handling of the trophy, even though they are organized by LaLiga. It organizes the rest of national league tiers: Primera Federación (3rd), Segunda Federación (4th) and Tercera Federación (5th). It also rules all the female national competitions except the top league, Liga F.

It is also responsible for appointing the management of the men's, women's, and youth national football teams, the futsal and beach soccer. As of 2023, the federation has 30,188 registered clubs and 1,248,511 federated football players.

== History ==
=== Origins ===
The Federación Española de Clubs de Football (FECF) was established in Madrid on 14 October 1909, serving as the forerunner of the current "Royal Spanish Football Federation" (RFEF) founded four years later. Some of the first clubs to join this original federation were FC Barcelona, Club Español de Madrid, Sociedad Gimnástica, the Irún Sporting Club, Tarragona Futbol Club, Fortuna de Vigo and Sporting de Vigo. However, other clubs did not recognize the new organization as a single national federation, including relevant entities such as Madrid FC and Athletic Club and the current national champion, Club Ciclista de San Sebastián, and this caused the 1910 Copa del Rey to have two parallel rival cup competitions: an "official", organized by the newly created FECF, in Madrid, won by Barcelona, and an "unofficial", organized by the UECF (Unión Española de Clubes de Fútbol), in San Sebastián, won by Athletic. Both are currently recognized as official by the RFEF.

The discussions to decide the venue of the 1913 Copa del Rey ended up causing another split, with Barcelona and España de Barcelona announcing their departure in the assembly held in May 1912, along with the Gipuzkoan clubs of Real Sociedad and Vasconia, and on 29 November 1912, these clubs founded the "Spanish Union of Football Clubs" (UECF) in San Sebastián, and again two parallel tournaments were held.

Both the Spanish Federation of Clubs (FECF) and the Spanish Union of Clubs (UECF), tried to become the representatives of Spanish football. Both organizations had a monarch as parents, them being Queen Victoria Eugenia (leading a tournament of the Union of Clubs, for which she awarded a cup) and King Alfonso XIII (honorary president of the Federation since its foundation). King Alfonso XIII accepted the honorary presidency of the UECF and granted it the title of "Royal" on 22 February 1913 (the same title was granted to FECF later on 30 May 1913). In March, it was reported that the Committee of FIFA did not accept the registration of the FECF due to the federative split existing in Spain, forcing both federations to merge or to create an interfederal committee similar to the one existing in France (Comité français interfédéral). When it was founded, the FECF joined the UIAFA, but at that point that governing body had disappeared, so it was urgent and necessary to join another international federation. Madrid FC was a founder of FIFA in 1904, but after that it did not take part in any congress or meeting and it lost its membership, so there was no Spanish representative affiliated with FIFA between 1905 and 1913.

The RUECF try to gain recognition by holding an international match against a Ligue de Football Association team (LFA was part of the French CFI, which was a member of FIFA), held on 25 May 1913 at the Amute in Hondarribia. José Berraondo performed the functions of the Spanish coach and refereed the match. The game ended in a 1–1 draw with Spain's goalscorer being the captain Juan Arzuaga. According press, after that match Alfonso XIII called Juan Padrós, president of the FECF, to inquire about what is happening and ask him to find a solution to the existing problem, and also Daniel Burley Woolfall, president of FIFA, contacted Carlos Padrós, former president of Madrid FC, to ask him about these new federations.

The FIFA Congress in Copenhagen held on 31 May 1913 rejected the entry of Spanish football, by not accepting the coexistence of two federations, which means that Spanish clubs cannot play international matches with FIFA member clubs. Also at the end of May, the FECF organized an Assembly and Juan Padrós resigned. A new board of directors was then created and Ricardo Ruiz Ferry (sports journalist) was elected president, with General Adolfo Meléndez and Antonio Bernabéu, as vice president and secretary, respectively. In July, the RUECF sent a letter signed by its secretary Julián Olave to RFECF proposing to reach a merger agreement between the two federations. Ruiz Ferry went to San Sebastián at the end of July to meet with the representatives of the RUECF and negotiate a definitive agreement with them. An agreement was reached to merge both federations and provisionally constitute four regional federations (east, west, north and center), whose delegates would attend the constitutive assembly of a new entity on 1 September 1913 at the headquarters of the Real Aero Club de España, in Madrid.

=== Foundation ===
On 1 September 1913, the constitutive assembly of a new federation began as planned, choosing the name "Royal Spanish Football Federation" (Real Federación Española de Football) and granting the honorary presidency to King Alfonso XIII. During this assembly it was recorded in the minutes that it was the constitutive assembly of a new federation completely different from the RFECF and the RUECF. In addition, a board of directors was appointed under the vice-presidency of Ruiz Ferry, with the authority to designate its president, in accordance with the honorary president. This board of directors took office on September 18. Alfonso XIII officially granted the title of "Royal" to the RFEF on 25 September 1913 and accepted the honorary presidency. Historically, it has been considered the RFEF was officially established on 29 September 1913, although other sources place the date of foundation at 1 September 1913, when the first session of the constitutive assembly was held. Also on 29 September 1913, the RFEF was accepted as a provisional member of FIFA, formalizing the federation's full entry into FIFA at the assembly held in Oslo on 27 July 1914. The RFEF presented its statutes for approval and registration in the Associations Register on 16 January 1914. However, as was usual at that time, the process was delayed and the approval was not effective until 16 September 1921. The appointment of Francisco García Molinas as president of the RFEF was reported in January 1914. Lastly, the RFECF was dissolved on 18 October 1913 and the RUECF disappeared on 5 February 1914.

In order to put an end to the disputes that had marked the last editions of the Copa del Rey, it was agreed, among other measures, to form a championship for each regional federation (the country was divided into ten regions), which would serve as the qualifying stages for the tournament. The 1914 Copa del Rey was the first edition of the competition to be organized by the RFEF, and Athletic Club were the winners after beating FC Espanya 2–1 in the final. After their foundation in September 1913, one of the first initiatives taken by the Royal Spanish Football Federation was to promote an inter-regional championship that would serve as the first major "showcase" of Spanish football, and consequently, as the bases for the formation of a Spanish team that could compete with other international teams; and thus, in 1915, they launched the Prince of Asturias Cup, which was sponsored by King Alfonso XIII, who donated the trophy which his son, Alfonso, Prince of Asturias, had to deliver, hence the name of the tournament.

=== National team ===
On 21 May 1920, the General Assembly of the RFEF approved the creation of the national team to participate in the 1920 Antwerp Olympic Games. A committee of selectors made up of Paco Bru (representing the Catalonia region), José Angel Berraondo (from the North region) and Julián Ruete (from the Center region) was appointed, although the latter two ultimately resigned for personal reasons, and Luis Argüello (Treasurer of the Federation) joined the expedition.

On 28 August 1920, the first official match of the Spanish national team was played, held at the La Butte stadium (now Joseph Marien Stadium) in Brussels, in front of some 3,000 spectators. Spain wore a red shirt, white shorts, black socks and an embroidered lion on the chest. The match ended with a 1–0 victory against Denmark, with a goal from Gipuzkoan Patricio Arabolaza in the 54th minute. In their maiden international tournament, Spain returned from Belgian lands with the silver medal after beating the Netherlands in the decisive match.

After the victory in the 2023 FIFA Women's World Cup, along with the 2010 FIFA World Cup title by the men's side, Spain became one of the two countries (with Germany), to win both men and women world championships. Besides, together with their youth teams, Spain became the current world champion in all three female categories (U-17, U-20 and senior level), unprecedented in the women's game.

=== National league ===
On 30 June 1926, after a long process, the clubs approved the first professional football regulations, thus, following the English model, the sport of football become professional in Spain. This would lay the foundation for the founding of the "Campeonato Nacional de Liga" (La Liga), in 1929.

The first league edition ran from February to June 1929, and was played by ten clubs. Six clubs were selected for being Copa del Rey winners (Real Madrid, Barcelona, Athletic Bilbao, Arenas Club, Real Unión and Real Sociedad —as the successor club of the Club Ciclista), another three as runners-up (Atlético Madrid, RCD Espanyol and CE Europa), and to decide the tenth place, an eliminatory tournament between ten clubs was organized, which Racing de Santander won after beating Sevilla in the decisive match. Barcelona was proclaimed champion of the first league edition with 25 points, closely followed by Real Madrid at 23.

== Competitions ==
RFEF national competitions:

- Men's competitions:
  - Primera Federación (3rd)
  - Segunda Federación (4th)
  - Tercera Federación (5th)
  - Copa de S.M. el Rey
  - Supercopa de España
  - Copa Federación
- Women's competitions:
  - Primera Federación (2nd)
  - Segunda Federación (3rd)
  - Tercera Federación (4th)
  - Copa de S.M. la Reina
  - Supercopa de España
- Youth competitions:
  - División de Honor Juvenil (1st)
  - Liga Nacional Juvenil (2nd)
  - Copa del Rey Juvenil
  - Copa de Campeones Juvenil

== Honours ==
=== Men ===
- FIFA World Cup

- Winners (2): 2010, 2026
- Fourth place (1): 1950

- UEFA European Championship

- Winners (4): 1964, 2008, 2012, 2024
- Runners-up (1): 1984
- Semi-finals (1): 2020

- UEFA Nations League

- Winners (1): 2023
- Runners-up (2): 2021, 2025

- Olympic Games

- Gold medal (2): 1992, 2024
- Silver medal (3): 1920, 2000, 2020

- FIFA Confederations Cup

- Runners-up (1): 2013
- Third place (1): 2009

=== Women ===
- FIFA Women's World Cup

- Winners (1): 2023

- UEFA Women's European Championship

- Runners-up (1): 2025
- Semi-finals (1): 1997

- UEFA Women's Nations League

- Winners (2): 2024, 2025

- Olympic Games

- Fourth place (1): 2024

=== National youth teams ===
==== Men ====
- FIFA U-20 World Cup

- Winners (1): 1999
- Runners-up (2): 1985, 2003
- Fourth place (1): 1995

- FIFA U-17 World Cup

- Runners-up (4): 1991, 2003, 2007, 2017
- Third place (2): 1997, 2009

- UEFA U-21 Championship

- Winners (5): 1986, 1998, 2011, 2013, 2019
- Runners-up (4): 1984, 1996, 2017, 2023
- Third place (3): 1994, 2000, 2021

- UEFA U-19/18 Championship (U-19 since 2002)

- Winners (13): 1952, 1954, 1995, 2002, 2004, 2006, 2007, 2011, 2012, 2015, 2019, 2024, 2026
- Runners-up (5): 1957, 1964, 1996, 2010, 2025
- Third place (6): 1976, 1990, 1993, 1994, 1997, 2001

- UEFA U-17/16 Championship (U-17 since 2002)

- Winners (9): 1986, 1988, 1991, 1997, 1999, 2001, 2007, 2008, 2017
- Runners-up (6): 1992, 1995, 2003, 2004, 2010, 2016
- Third place (4): 1985, 1998, 2006, 2026

==== Women ====
- FIFA U-20 Women's World Cup

- Winners (2): 2022, 2026
- Runners-up (1): 2018

- FIFA U-17 Women's World Cup

- Winners (2): 2018, 2022
- Runners-up (1): 2014
- Third place (2): 2010, 2016

- UEFA Women's U-19 Championship

- Winners (8): 2004, 2017, 2018, 2022, 2023, 2024, 2025, 2026
- Runners-up (5): 2000, 2012, 2014, 2015, 2016
- Third place (1): 2019

- UEFA Women's U-17 Championship

- Winners (5): 2010, 2011, 2015, 2018, 2024
- Runners-up (6): 2009, 2014, 2016, 2017, 2022, 2023
- Third place (3): 2013, 2019, 2026

=== National futsal team ===
==== Men ====
- FIFA Futsal World Cup

- Winners (2): 2000, 2004
- Runners-up (3): 1996, 2008, 2012

- UEFA Futsal Championship

- Winners (8): 1996, 2001, 2005, 2007, 2010, 2012, 2016, 2026
- Runners-up (2): 1999, 2018

==== Women ====
- FIFA Futsal Women's World Cup

- Third place (1): 2025

- UEFA Women's Futsal Championship

- Winners (3): 2019, 2022, 2023

== Territories ==
The RFEF consists of 19 regional and territorial federations, comprising the different autonomous communities and cities in Spain.

- Andalusia: Royal Andalusian Football Federation
- Aragon: Royal Aragonese Football Federation
- Asturias: Royal Football Federation of the Principality of Asturias
- Balearic Islands: Balearic Islands Football Federation
- Basque Country: Basque Football Federation
- Canary Islands: Canarian Football Federation
- Cantabria: Royal Cantabrian Football Federation
- Castile and León: Royal Castile and León Football Federation
- Castilla–La Mancha: Castilla–La Mancha Football Federation
- Catalonia: Catalan Football Federation
- Ceuta: Ceuta Football Federation
- Community of Madrid: Royal Madrid Football Federation
- Extremadura: Extremaduran Football Federation
- Galicia: Royal Galician Football Federation
- La Rioja: Riojan Football Federation
- Melilla: Royal Melillan Football Federation
- Region of Murcia: Football Federation of the Region of Murcia
- Navarre: Navarre Football Federation
- Valencian Community: Valencian Community Football Federation

== Presidents ==
President	Term
Francisco García	1913–1916
Gabriel Maura	1916–1920
David Ormaechea	1921–1923
Gabriel Maura	1923–1924
Julián Olave	1924–1926
Antonio Bernabéu	1926–1927
Pedro Díez de Rivera (Marqués de Someruelos)	1927–1931
Leopoldo García Durán	1931–1936
Julián Troncoso	1939–1940
Luis Saura	1940–1941
Javier Barroso	1941–1946
Jesús Rivero	1946–1947
Armando Muñoz Calero	1947–1950
Manuel Valdés	1950–1952
Sancho Dávila	1952–1954
Juan Touzón	1954–1956
Alfonso de la Fuente	1956–1960
Benito Pico	1960–1967
José Luis Costa	1967–1970
José Luis Pérez-Payá	1970–1975
Pablo Porta	1975–1984
José Luis Roca	1984–1988
Ángel María Villar	1988–2017
Juan Luis Larrea (interim)	2017–2018
Luis Rubiales	2018–2023
Pedro Rocha (interim)	2023–2024
Pedro Rocha	2024
María Ángeles García Chaves (interim)	2024
Rafael Louzán	2024–present
