= Pedro Rocha (Spanish businessman) =

Spanish businessman

27th President of Royal Spanish Football Federation
- In office 26 April 2024 – 16 July 2024; Acting: 10 September 2023 – 26 April 2024
- Preceded by: Luis Rubiales
- Succeeded by: Rafael Louzán; María Ángeles García Chaves (interim)

Personal details
- Born: Pedro Rocha Junco; 16 October 1954 (age 72) Cáceres, Spain

Pedro Rocha Junco (born 16 October 1954) is a Spanish businessman and sports manager. He was the president of the Royal Spanish Football Federation from 26 April 2024, after Luis Rubiales was disqualified by FIFA for his kiss to Jenni Hermoso, to 16 July 2024, when he was disqualified by the Sports Administrative Court (TAD).

== Biography ==
Rocha has had a diverse career both on and off the playing field.

As a player, he dedicated himself to indoor soccer, where he played several seasons in the Honor Division. His passion for the sport led him to occupy several important roles, including being a manager and member of the coaching staff of Cacereño in the 3rd Division and 2nd Division “B”, and vice president of C. Cacereño Malpartida in the 3rd national division.

== Business career ==
Rocha is a businessman since 1993 and manager of up to three establishments, his life has been closely linked to football. Pedro Rocha came to play for several seasons in the Honor Division of futsal, and already in the managerial field, he was part of the management and coaching staff of C.P. Cacereño. In addition, he was president of the Futsal Committee of the Extremadura Federation from 2008 to 2011.

== Administrative career ==
Rocha, who served as deputy vice president under Luis Rubiales at the Royal Spanish Football Federation, became interim president in September 2023 before being officially appointed as the new president in April 2024. On July 16, 2024, following the national team's victory in the UEFA Euro 2024, Spain's Sports Administrative Court (TAD) suspended Rocha for two years. The suspension was due to his abuse of authority in dismissing former General Secretary Andreu Camps and handing him two fines, which was considered as a breach of sports discipline regulations.

Sporting positions
Preceded by Luis Rubiales	President of the Royal Spanish Football Federation; 2024	Succeeded by María Ángeles García Chaves (interim)
