= Placebo in history =

Aspect of medical history

The word placebo was used in a medicinal context in the late 18th century to describe a "commonplace method or medicine" and in 1811 it was defined as "any medicine adapted more to please than to benefit the patient". Although this definition contained a derogatory implication, it did not necessarily imply that the remedy had no effect.

Placebos have featured in medical use until well into the twentieth century. In 1955 Henry K. Beecher published an influential paper entitled The Powerful Placebo which proposed idea that placebo effects were clinically important. Subsequent re-analysis of his materials, however, found in them no evidence of any "placebo effect".

== Etymology ==
Placebo is the opening word of the antiphon of vespers in the Office of the Dead, used as a name for the service as a whole. The full sentence, from the Vulgate, is Placebo Domino in regione vivorum 'I will please the Lord in the land of the living', from Psalm 116:9. To sing placebo at a funeral came to mean to take money to falsely claim a connection to the deceased to get a share of the funeral meal, and hence a flatterer, and so a deceptive act to please.

== Early medical usage ==
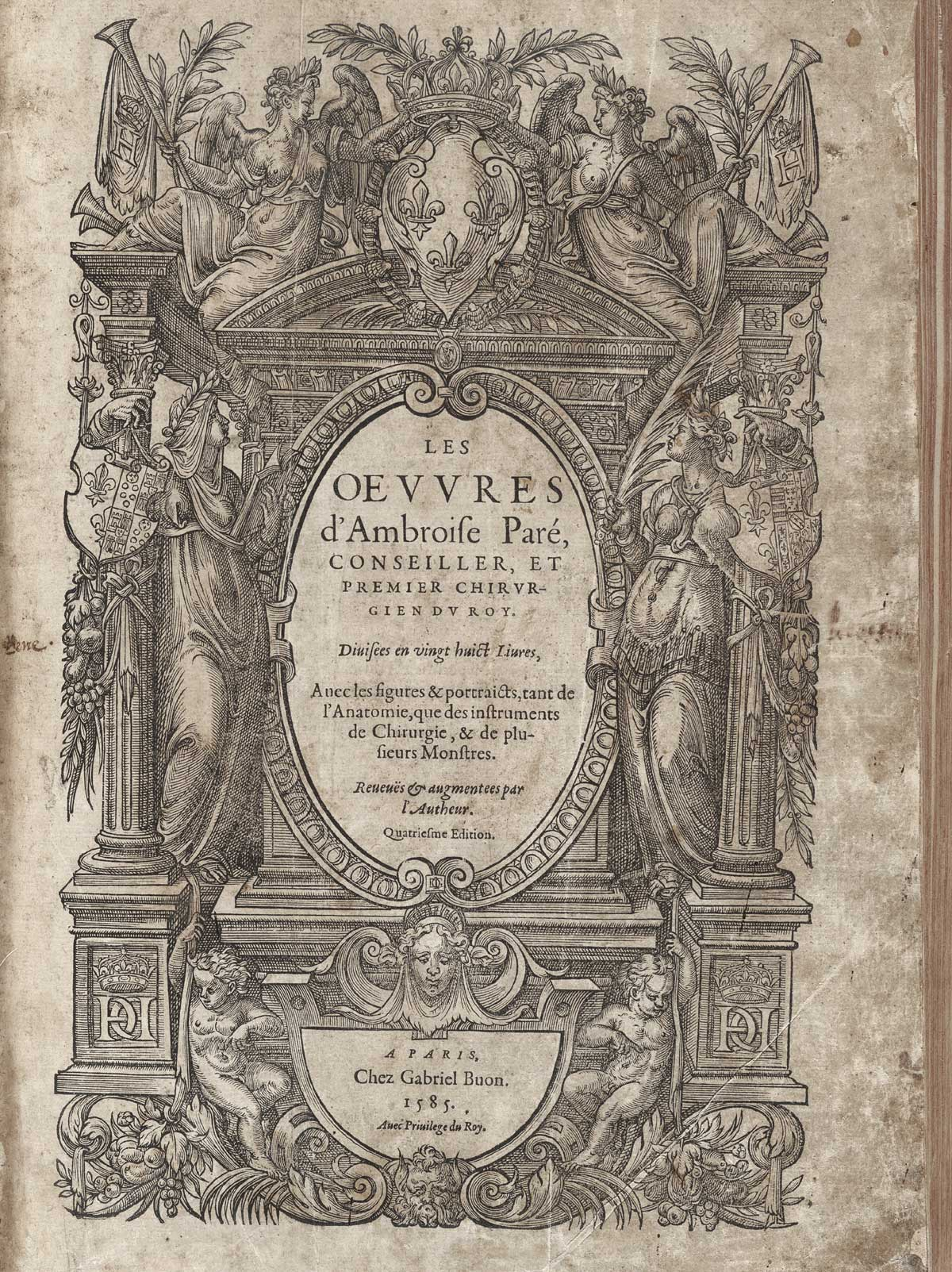
Doctors and surgeons such as Ambroise Paré traditionally emphasized the importance of consoling the patient through the use of 'placebos'. This is the title page to one of Paré's works.

In the practice of medicine it had been long understood that, as Ambroise Paré (1510–1590) had expressed it, the physician's duty was to "cure occasionally, relieve often, console always" ("Guérir quelquefois, soulager souvent, consoler toujours"). Accordingly, placebos were widespread in medicine until the 20th century, and were often endorsed as necessary deceptions.

According to Nicholas Jewson, eighteenth century English medicine was gradually moving away from a model in which the patient had considerable interaction with the physician – and, through this consultative relationship, had an equal influence on the physician's therapeutic approach. It was moving towards a paradigm in which the patient became the recipient of a more standardized form of intervention that was determined by the prevailing opinions of the medical profession of the day.

Jewson characterized this as parallel to the changes that were taking place in the manner in which medical knowledge was being produced; namely, a transition from "bedside medicine", through to "hospital medicine", and finally to "laboratory medicine".

The last vestiges of the "consoling" approach to treatment were the prescription of morale-boosting and pleasing remedies, such as the "sugar pill", electuary or pharmaceutical syrup; all of which had no known pharmacodynamic action, even at the time. Those doctors who provided their patients with these sorts of morale-boosting therapies (which, while having no pharmacologically active ingredients, provided reassurance and comfort) did so either to reassure their patients while the Vis medicatrix naturae (i.e., "the healing power of nature") performed its normalizing task of restoring them to health, or to gratify their patients' need for an active treatment.

In 1811, Hooper's Quincy's Lexicon–Medicum defined placebo as "an epithet given to any medicine adapted more to please than benefit the patient".

Early implementations of placebo controls date back to 16th-century Europe with Catholic efforts to discredit exorcisms. Individuals who claimed to be possessed by demonic forces were given false holy objects. If the person reacted with violent contortions, it was concluded that the possession was purely imagination.

Use of the placebo effect as a medical treatment has been controversial throughout history, and was common until the mid twentieth century. In 1903 Richard Cabot concluded that it should be avoided because it is deceptive. Newman points out the "placebo paradox" – it may be unethical to use a placebo, but also unethical "not to use something that heals". He suggests to solve this dilemma by appropriating the meaning response in medicine, that is make use of the placebo effect, as long as the "one administering... is honest, open, and believes in its potential healing power".

John Haygarth was the first to investigate the efficacy of the placebo effect in the 18th century. He tested a popular medical treatment of his time, called "Perkins tractors", and concluded that the remedy was ineffectual by demonstrating that the results from a dummy remedy were just as useful as from the alleged "active" remedy.

Émile Coué, a French pharmacist, working as an apothecary at Troyes between 1882 and 1910, also advocated the effectiveness of the "Placebo Effect". He became known for reassuring his clients by praising each remedy's efficiency and leaving a small positive notice with each given medication. His book Self-Mastery Through Conscious Autosuggestion was published in England (1920) and in the United States (1922).

Placebos remained widespread in medicine until the 20th century, and they were sometimes endorsed as necessary deceptions. In 1903, Richard Cabot said that he was brought up to use placebos, but he ultimately concluded by saying that "I have not yet found any case in which a lie does not do more harm than good".

T. C. Graves first defined the "placebo effect" in a published paper in The Lancet in 1920. He spoke of "the placebo effects of drugs" being manifested in those cases where "a real psychotherapeutic effect appears to have been produced".

== Placebo effect ==
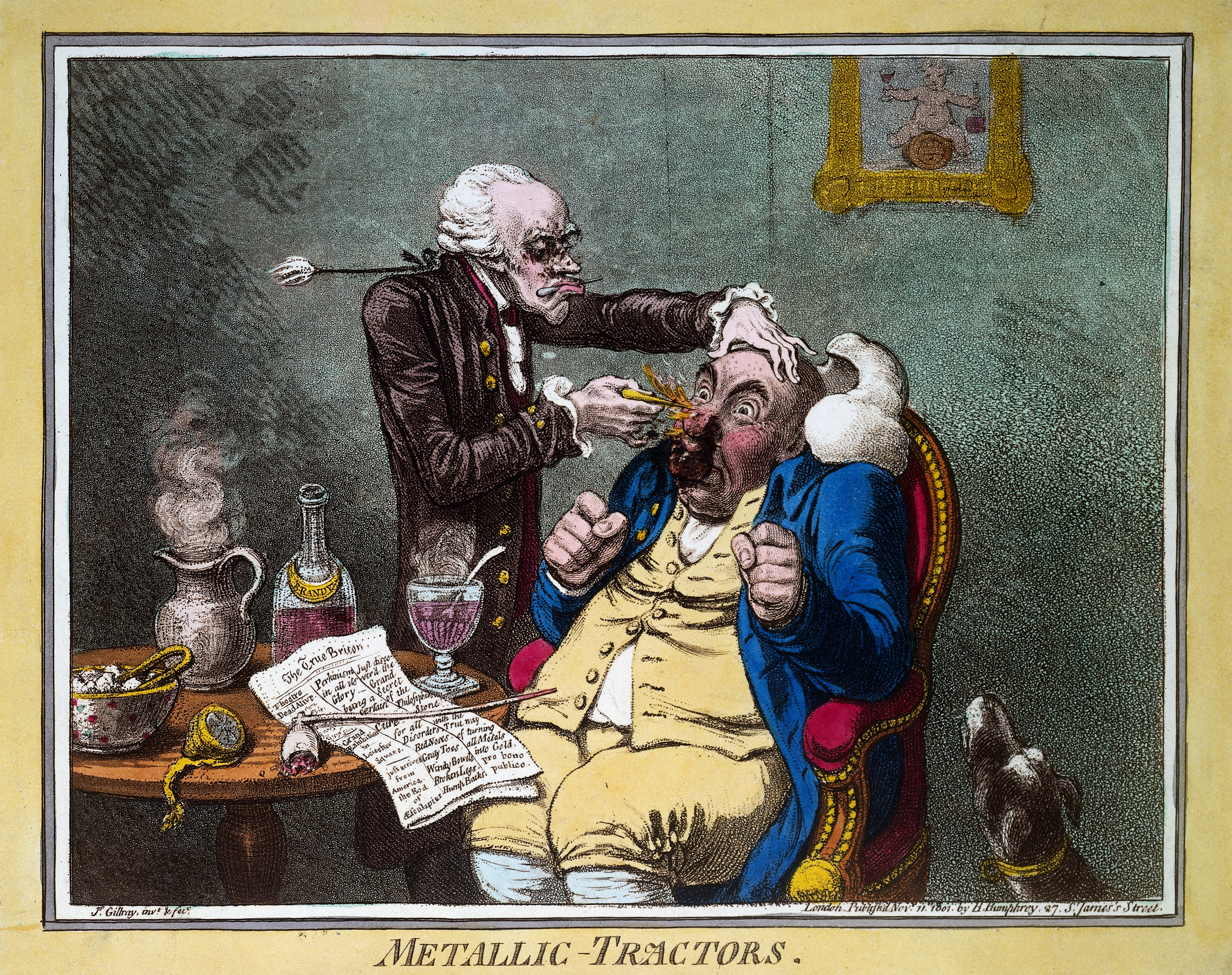
Metallic Tractors. Caricature of a quack treating a patient with Perkins Patent Tractors by James Gillray, 1801.

The placebo effect of new drugs was known anecdotally in the 18th century, as demonstrated by Michel-Philippe Bouvart's 1780s quip to a patient that she should "take [a remedy] ... and hurry up while it [still] cures." A similar sentiment was expressed by William Heberden in 1803 and Armand Trousseau in 1833. It is often attributed to William Osler (1901) but without a precise source, and it does not appear in his publications.

The first to recognize and demonstrate the placebo effect was English physician John Haygarth in 1799. He tested a popular medical treatment of his time, called "Perkins tractors", which were metal pointers supposedly able to 'draw out' disease. They were sold at the extremely high price of five guineas, and Haygarth set out to show that the high cost was unnecessary. He did this by comparing the results from dummy wooden tractors with a set of allegedly "active" metal tractors, and published his findings in a book On the Imagination as a Cause & as a Cure of Disorders of the Body.

The wooden pointers were just as useful as the expensive metal ones, showing "to a degree which has never been suspected, what powerful influence upon diseases is produced by mere imagination". While the word placebo had been used since 1772, this is the first real demonstration of the placebo effect.

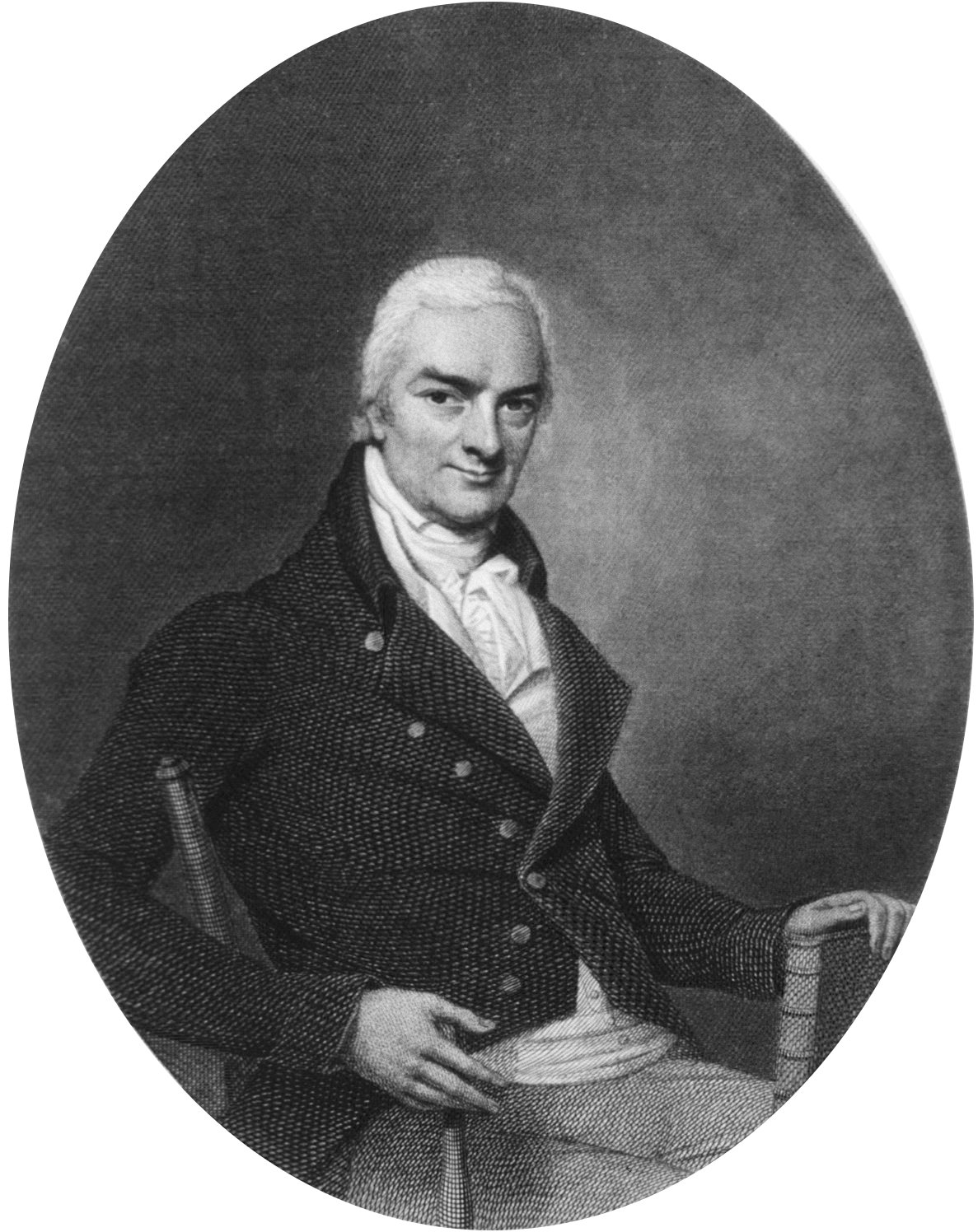
John Haygarth was the first to demonstrate the placebo effect in 1799.

In modern times the first to define and discuss the "placebo effect" was T.C. Graves, in a 1920 paper in The Lancet. He spoke of "the placebo effects of drugs" being manifested in those cases where "a real psychotherapeutic effect appears to have been produced".

At the Royal London Hospital in 1933, William Evans and Clifford Hoyle experimented with 90 subjects and published studies which compared the outcomes from the administration of an active drug and a dummy simulator ("placebo") in the same trial. The experiment displayed no significant difference between drug treatment and placebo treatment, leading the researchers to conclude that the drug exerted no specific effects in relation to the conditions being treated. A similar experiment was carried out by Harry Gold, Nathaniel Kwit and Harold Otto in 1937, with the use of 700 subjects.

In 1946, the Yale biostatistician and physiologist E. Morton Jellinek described the "placebo reaction" or "response". He probably used the terms "placebo response" and "placebo reaction" as interchangeable. Henry K. Beecher's 1955 paper The Powerful Placebo was the first to use the term "placebo effect", which he contrasts with drug effects. Beecher suggested placebo effects occurred in about 35% of people. However, this paper has been criticized for failing to distinguish the placebo effect from other factors, and for thereby encouraging an inflated notion of the placebo effect, and a 1997 re-analysis failed to support Beecher's conclusions.

In 1955, Henry K. Beecher published a paper entitled The Powerful Placebo. Since that time, 40 years ago, the placebo effect has been considered a scientific fact. Beecher was the first scientist to quantify the placebo effect. [...] This publication is still the most frequently cited placebo reference. Recently Beecher's article was reanalyzed with surprising results: In contrast to his claim, no evidence was found of any placebo effect in any of the studies cited by him.

— Kienle & Kiene, The Powerful Placebo Effect: Fact or Fiction?

In 1961 Henry K. Beecher concluded that surgeons he categorized as enthusiasts relieved their patients' chest pain and heart problems more than skeptic surgeons.

In 1961 Walter Kennedy introduced the word nocebo to refer to a neutral substance that creates harmful effects in a patient who takes it.

Beginning in the 1960s, the placebo effect became widely recognized and placebo-controlled trials became the norm in the approval of new medications.

Dylan Evans argues that placebos are linked with activation of the acute-phase response so will work only on subjective conditions such as pain, swelling, stomach ulcers, depression, and anxiety that are linked to this.

A 2001 systematic review of clinical trials concluded that there was no evidence of clinically important effects, except perhaps in the treatment of pain and continuous subjective outcomes. The authors later published a Cochrane review with similar conclusions (updated as of 2010). Most studies have attributed the difference from baseline until the end of the trial to a placebo effect, but the reviewers examined studies which had both placebo and untreated groups in order to distinguish the placebo effect from the natural progression of the disease.

Placebo observations differ between individuals. In the 1950s, there was considerable research to find whether there was a specific personality to those that responded to placebos. The findings could not be replicated and it is now thought to have no effect.

The word obecalp, "placebo" spelled backwards, was coined by an Australian doctor in 1998 when he recognised the need for a freely available placebo. The word is sometimes used to make the use or prescription of fake medicine less obvious to the patient.

It has been suggested that a distinction exists between the placebo effect (which applies to a group) and the placebo response (which is individual).

== See also ==
- History of medicine
- History of placebo-controlled studies
