= Barsalou =

Barsalou is a French surname, of Catalan origin (it corresponds phonetically to the Barceló surname), with various spellings including Barsolou, Barselou, and Barcelo, and may refer to:

- Lawrence W. Barsalou (born 1951), American psychologist,
- Jean-Baptiste Barsalou (1706–1776), master tanner from Montreal
- Joseph Barsalou (physician) (1600–1660), French apothecary and physician
- Joseph Barsalou (businessman) (1822–1897), businessman and politician from Montreal
- Paul Barselou (1922–2017), American actor

== See also ==
- Barceló, a Catalan surname
