= Barcelos =

Barcelos may refer to:

- Barcelos, Amazonas, a municipality in the state of Amazonas
- Barcelos, Portugal, a municipality in the district of Braga
  - Barcelos (parish), a former-civil parish in the municipality of Barcelos

== People with the name ==
- Pero de Barcelos, Portuguese explorer of North America

== See also ==
- Barceló
- Count of Barcelos, a title of nobility in Portugal
