= Bouvard =

Bouvard may refer to:

- Bouvard, Western Australia, the southernmost suburb of Mandurah
- Bouvard et Pécuchet, an unfinished satirical work by Gustave Flaubert published in 1881

== People with the surname ==
- Alexis Bouvard (1767–1843), French astronomer
- Charles Bouvard (1572–1658), French chemist and physician
- François Bouvard (c.1684–1760), French composer of the Baroque era
- Gilles Bouvard (born 1969), French former racing cyclist
- Loïc Bouvard (born 1929), member of the National Assembly of France
- Michel Bouvard (born 1955), member of the National Assembly of France
- Philippe Bouvard (born 1929), French radio and TV presenter

== See also ==
- Bouvart (disambiguation)
