= Ormaechea =

Ormaechea is a Basque surname. Notable people with the surname include:

- Agustín Ormaechea (born 1991), Uruguayan rugby union player, son of Diego
- David Ormaechea (1887–?), Spanish lawyer and sports leader
- Diego Ormaechea (born 1959), former Uruguayan rugby union player, father of Agustín
- Francisco de Lersundi y Ormaechea (1817 – 1874 ), Spanish noble and politician
- José Eulogio Gárate Ormaechea (born 1944), former Spanish footballer
- Paula Ormaechea (born 1992), Argentine tennis player
