= Iago Falque =

Spanish footballer (born 1990)

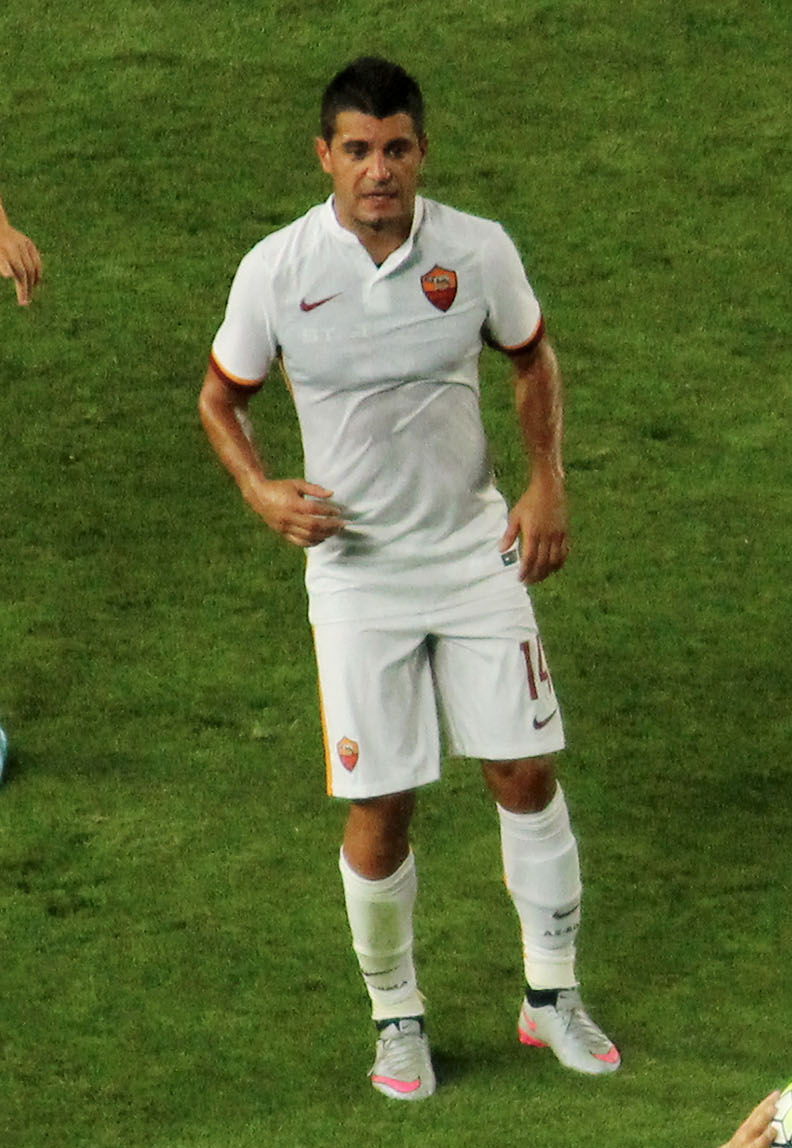
- Falque playing for Roma in 2015

Personal information
- Full name: Iago Falque Silva
- Date of birth: 4 January 1990 (age 36)
- Place of birth: Vigo, Spain
- Height: 1.74 m (5 ft 9 in)
- Position: Forward

Youth career
- 2000–2001: Real Madrid
- 2001–2008: Barcelona
- 2008–2010: Juventus
- 2009–2010: → Bari (loan)

Senior career*
Years	Team	Apps	(Gls)
2010–2011	Juventus	0	(0)
2010–2011	→ Villarreal B (loan)	36	(11)
2011	→ Tottenham Hotspur (loan)	0	(0)
2012–2014	Tottenham Hotspur	1	(0)
2012	→ Southampton (loan)	1	(0)
2013	→ Almería (loan)	22	(2)
2013–2014	→ Rayo Vallecano (loan)	28	(3)
2014–2015	Genoa	32	(13)
2015–2017	Roma	22	(2)
2016–2017	→ Torino (loan)	35	(12)
2017–2022	Torino	67	(18)
2020	→ Genoa (loan)	10	(2)
2020–2021	→ Benevento (loan)	5	(1)
2022–2023	America de Cali	31	(6)

International career
2007	Spain U17	12	(3)
2008–2009	Spain U19	11	(4)
2009	Spain U20	1	(0)
2011	Spain U21	1	(0)
2008	Galicia	1	(0)
Medal record
Men's football
Representing Spain
U-17 World Cup
Runner-up	2007 Korea
- * Club domestic league appearances and goals as of 20 September 2022

Iago Falque Silva (Galician: [ˈjaɣʊ ˈfalkɪ ˈsilβɐ], Spanish: [ˈɟʝaɣo ˈfalke ˈsilβa]; born 4 January 1990) is a Spanish former professional footballer who played as a forward.

== Club career ==
=== Early career ===
Born in Vigo, Galicia, his mother is politician Carmela Silva, Falque began his career with Real Madrid before moving to Barcelona in 2001. After several years in the club's youth ranks, he was never promoted either to the first team of Frank Rijkaard nor B side of Luis Enrique. On 30 August 2008, Falque signed a four-year contract with Juventus, and was officially presented on 2 September 2008. He transferred to the Serie A club on a free deal which included compensation to Barcelona up to €2.5 million if certain matches and goals were reached by the player in his stay with the club.

On 25 August 2009, Falque was transferred on loan to Bari, then newly promoted to Serie A.

On 29 July 2010, Falque joined Villarreal B on loan with the option to make the deal permanent.

=== Tottenham Hotspur ===
On 25 August 2011, Falque joined Premier League club Tottenham Hotspur on a season-long loan deal, with an option to make the move permanent. He was first named in a matchday squad on 10 September, remaining unused in a 2–0 win at Wolverhampton Wanderers, and made his debut five days later by starting in a goalless away draw against PAOK in the season's UEFA Europa League.

==== Loans to Southampton and Almería ====
On 16 January 2012, Tottenham signed Falque permanently for €1 million (€250,000 went to Barcelona), loaning him to Championship leaders Southampton for the remainder of the season. He made his Southampton debut seven days later, starting in a 0–2 home loss against Leicester City.

Falque did not make another appearance for the Saints, subsequently returning to Tottenham in June 2012. On 18 July he scored in a pre-season 2–0 victory at Stevenage. On 9 December, he played his only Premier League match, appearing for five minutes at the end of a 1–2 loss at Everton as a substitute for striker Jermain Defoe.

On 23 January 2013, Falque joined Almería on loan until the end of the season. He made his debut for the Andalusians on 4 February in a 1–2 away loss against Real Madrid Castilla, and scored his first goal on 24 February in a 4–1 home routing over Ponferradina.

==== Loan to Rayo Vallecano ====
On 22 August 2013, Falque joined La Liga side Rayo Vallecano in a season-long loan deal, with a buyout clause. He made his division debut eight days later in a 1–2 home loss against Levante. In February 2014, Falque scored his first goals for Rayo, in a 4–1 win over Málaga; for the first, he "rushed down the right wing, beating two defenders with a turn and a nutmeg before knocking the ball in off the near post", and in the second, "exhibiting the same quick feet and ability to float past defenders as he did in the first".

=== Genoa ===
On 1 August 2014, Genoa confirmed the signing of Falque. He scored his first Serie A goal on 2 November in a 4–2 win at Udinese. On 24 February 2015, Falque opened the scoring in the Derby della Lanterna against Sampdoria, an eventual 1–1 draw. He scored his 12th and 13th goals of the season on 17 May in a 4–1 win away to Atalanta.

=== Roma ===
On 1 July 2015, Falque's transfer to Roma was confirmed as a season-loan deal for €1 million, with a buyout clause activated as soon as he plays one official match for Roma with the additional sum of €7 million with €1 million performance-related bonus. The contract that Falque signed after the buyout clause will be until 30 June 2020.

=== Torino ===
On 19 July 2016, it was announced that Falque was loaned to Torino with a buying option for the 2016–17 season. He scored his first goal in Serie A for Torino on 11 September, from a free-kick, in a 2–1 defeat to Atalanta. On 25 September he scored a brace, in a 3–1 victory against parent club Roma. He finished his first season with Torino with 12 goals and 8 assists, his personal best since 2015 at Genoa.

On 4 January 2017, the day of his 27th birthday, it was announced that Torino exercised the right to purchase Falque outright. He started the 2017–18 season with Torino, playing two consecutive seasons for the same club for the first time in his career. He finished the season as top-scorer for Torino with 12 goals and eight assists (plus two goals in Coppa Italia), his personal best season.

On 31 January 2020, Falque returned to Genoa on loan with an option to purchase.

On 29 September 2020, Falque joined Benevento on loan until 30 June 2021.

=== América de Cali ===
On 23 January 2022, Falque joined Colombian team América de Cali, on a free transfer. After an attack when Falque's vehicle was shot at least three times near América de Cali's training facilities, his contract with América de Cali was terminated by mutual agreement.

== International career ==
In 2008, Falque played for the Galicia national football team in a friendly match against Iran.

== Career statistics ==
=== Club ===
As of match played 18 September 2023

Appearances and goals by club, season and competition
Club	League	Season	League		Cup		Europe		Other		Total	
Club	League	Season	Apps	Goals	Apps	Goals	Apps	Goals	Apps	Goals	Apps	Goals
Juventus	Serie A	2009–10	0	0	0	0	0	0	0	0	0	0
Villarreal (loan)	La Liga 2	2010–11	36	11	0	0	–		–		36	11
Tottenham (loan)	Premier League	2011–12	0	0	1	0	5	0	–		6	0
Tottenham	Premier League	2011–12	0	0	0	0	0	0	0	0	0	0
Tottenham	Premier League	2012–13	1	0	2	0	2	0	–		5	0
Southampton (loan)	Championship	2011–12	1	0	0	0	–		–		1	0
Almería (loan)	La Liga 2	2012–13	22	2	0	0	–		4	0	26	2
Rayo Vallecano (loan)	La Liga	2013–14	28	3	3	0	–		–		31	3
Genoa	Serie A	2014–15	32	13	1	0	–		–		33	13
Roma	Serie A	2015–16	22	2	0	0	5	1	–		27	3
Torino (loan)	Serie A	2016–17	35	12	0	0	–		–		35	12
Torino	Serie A	2017–18	37	12	3	2	–		–		40	14
Torino	Serie A	2018–19	26	6	2	0	–		–		28	6
Torino	Serie A	2019–20	4	0	0	0	1	0	–		5	0
Torino	Total		102	30	5	2	1	0	0	0	108	32
Genoa	Serie A	2019–20	10	2	0	0	–		–		10	2
Benevento	Serie A	2020–21	11	1	0	0	–		–		11	1
América de Cali	Categoría Primera A	2022	15	2	1	0	2	0	–		18	2
América de Cali	Categoría Primera A	2023	16	4	0	0	0	0	–		16	4
América de Cali	Total		31	6	1	0	2	0	–		34	6
Career total			296	70	13	2	15	1	4	0	328	73

== Honours ==
Juventus youth

- Torneo di Viareggio: 2009, 2010

Spain U17

- FIFA U-17 World Cup runner-up: 2007
