= Gabriel Maura =

Spanish historian and politician (1879–1963)

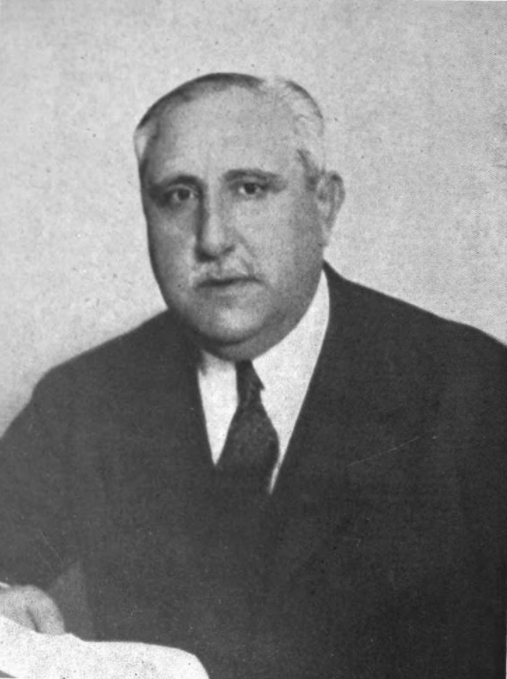
- Born: Gabriel Maura Gamazo; 25 January 1879; Madrid, Spain
- Died: 29 January 1963 (aged 84); Madrid, Spain
- Parent: Antonio Maura (father)
- Relatives: Miguel Maura (brother); Germán Gamazo (uncle)

Minister of Labour and Protection of Spain
- In office 18 February – 14 April 1931
- Monarch: Alfonso XIII
- Prime Minister: Juan Bautista Aznar
- Preceded by: Pedro Sangro de Ros de Olano
- Succeeded by: Francisco Largo Caballero

President of the Royal Spanish Football Federation
- In office 1916–1920
- Preceded by: Francisco García
- Succeeded by: David Ormaechea
- In office 1923–1924
- Preceded by: David Ormaechea
- Succeeded by: Antonio Bernabéu

Seat e of the Real Academia Española
- In office 18 January 1920 – 29 January 1963
- Preceded by: Julio Burell y Cuéllar (Note: Burell was elected for the position in 1916 but never took the seat)
- Succeeded by: Julio Guillén Tato

Gabriel Maura Gamazo, 1st Duke of Maura (25 January 1879 – 29 January 1963) was a Spanish politician and historian. He was the son of Antonio Maura, who was Prime Minister of Spain on five occasions. Gabriel was active in the Liberal-Conservative Party and served as Labour Minister in the last government cabinet of Alfonso XIII before the dictatorship of Miguel Primo de Rivera. He fled Spain during the Civil War and did not return until 1953. His archives were destroyed in the conflict by the Popular Front.

As a historian Maura Gamazo was known for his chronicle of the Primo de Rivera dictatorship, 'Bosquejo Histórico de la Dictadura' (English: Historical Sketch of the Dictatorship). He was a member of the Royal Spanish Academy and the Real Academia de la Historia, and he was also the second president of the Royal Spanish Football Federation between 1916-1920 and 1923-1924.

His second daughter María del Carmen Maura y Herrera (1905–1946) married Joaquín Álvarez de Toledo, 20th Duke of Medina Sidonia.

== Notes ==
Spanish nobility
| Preceded by New creation | Duke of Maura; 1930–1963 | Succeeded by Ramón Maura |
