= David Ormaechea =

Spanish lawyer and sports leader

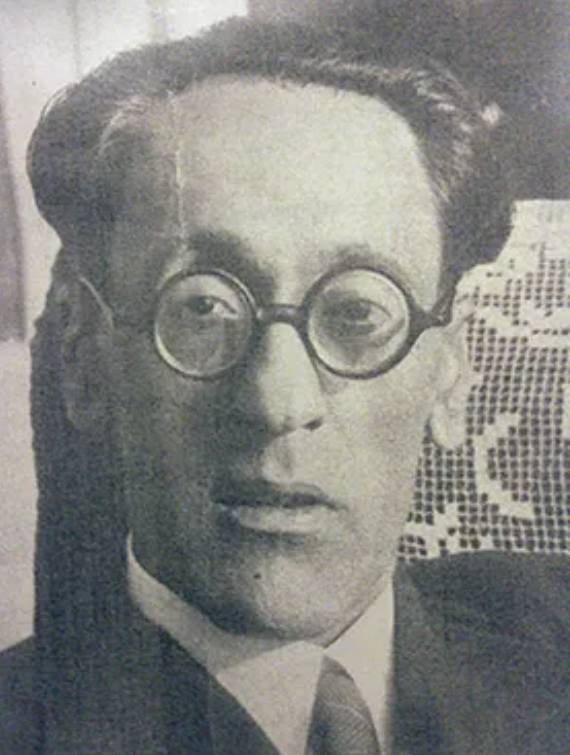
- Ormaechea around 1923

Personal information
- Full name: Vicente David Gerardo Ormaechea y Zubiri
- Date of birth: 25 April 1887
- Place of birth: Pamplona, Navarre, Spain
- Date of death: unknown
- Place of death: Spain

Managerial career
- Years: Team
- 1923: Spain (2)
4th President of the Spanish Football Federation
In office 1 August 1921 – 1923
Preceded by	Luis Argüello
Succeeded by	Gabriel Maura

Vicente David Gerardo Ormaechea y Zubiri (25 April 1887 – unknown) was a Spanish lawyer and sports leader who presided over the Spanish Football Federation between 1921 and 1923, and also a football Manager who co-directed two matches of the Spanish national team in 1923.

== Early life and education ==
Born on 25 April 1887 in Pamplona, Navarre, Ormaechea applied for the Instituto Cardenal Cisneros in 1901, aged 14, where he studied for four years, until 1905, the year in which he achieved his Bachelor's Degree.

On 30 August 1916, Ormaechea submitted his application to the Illustrious Bar Association of Madrid, which was accepted. At the end of 1917, he was working as an official of the General Administration Body of the Public Treasury, specifically in the general inspection.

== Sporting career ==
=== Sociedad Gimnástica ===
Ormaechea began his sports career in the early 20th century, at the multi-sport club Real Sociedad Gimnástica Española (RSGE), being one of the founders of its football team in 1907, aged 20. He eventually becoming its president, and as such, he served as the vice-president of the Spanish Football Federation (RFEF) during the mandate of Francisco García Molinas, which lasted from 1913 to 1916. In October 1918, Ormaechea, the president of RSGE, was among the renowned sporting personalities that attended an athletics festival organized by Athletic Bilbao. In that same year, he asked Luis Argüello to take charge of RSGE's treasury, with Argüello being eventually named accountant of the RFEF.

=== RFEF ===
On 1 August 1921, Ormaechea was elected as fourth president of the 5th president of the RFEF (replacing his former RSGE colleague Luis Argüello), a position that he held for two years until his resignation in 1923, being replaced by Gabriel Maura. This choice was carefully considered by the RFEF, who picked him due his long career in the world of football and his experience as both president of RSGE and former vice-president of the RFEF. In 1921, the authorities approved new statutes for the federation, which were signed by Ormaechea.

At the time, the RFEF was going through a complicated moment, staying afloat only thanks to Ormaechea's patience, justice, and seriousness, and also to the help of Luis Argüello and Joaquín Heredia, who were also members of Sociedad Gimnástica and Treasury officials, which allowed them to contact the Ministry of Finance to request tax exemption for sports fields and the declaration of these spaces as public utility entities. He also contacted the Argentine Football Association to organize a series of matches in South America.

Under his leadership, however, the situation with the several regional federations became increasingly unsustainable, reaching a breaking point in 1923, when the delegates of the regionals did not elect any member of the RFEF to attend the upcoming FIFA Congress, which caused Ormaechea and his team to resign, a request that was immediately accepted. In fact, the representatives of the Regional Federations had appointed Ormaechea as president only after Caña refused it.

=== Manager of Spain ===
In his functions as president, Ormaechea had the task of heading the Selection Committee of the Spanish national team, a triumvirate made up of himself, secretary Joaquín Heredia, and treasurer Luis Argüello, so he provisionally served as national coach in two friendly matches in early 1923, against France in San Sebastián on 28 January, which ended in a 3–0 win, and against Belgium in Antwerp on 4 February, which ended in a 1–0 loss.

== Later life ==
After leaving the RFEF in 1923, Ormaechea returned to his law firm on Arenal Street, one of the most important in the capital, which he combined with his position as the Head of the Caja General de Depósitos (CGD), where he had the specific mission of managing the funds existing in it. Throughout his career, he received several tributes and recognition from the National Court, the Bar Association, and the Academy of Jurisprudence. He has been described in the press as a "distinguished defense attorney", and likewise, in June 1925, he successfully defended a client who been accused of killing a waitress when a certain Dionisio Fernández Alegría was sentenced to over 14 years of temporary imprisonment for having committed that crime.

In the late 1920s, Ormaechea decided to try his luck as a theatre entrepreneur, becoming the manager of theatres, such as Maravilla, Eslava, Cervantes and Pavón, as well as being the driving force behind several artists of the time, such as the beautiful actress Lola Arbelaiz, and even wrote some librettos. In February 1931, Ormaechea wrote the prologue of Fuentes Bejaraño, a book about bullfighting, in which he wrote an argument in its defense, describing it as "brave, strong, tragic and noble". In June 1932, he signed the deed of acquisition of the Maravillas theatre, to which he planned to make major reforms, including adding an extra floor. During this period, the local press described him as "a notable lawyer and an excellent writer", "the learned lawyer and intelligent man of theatres", or simply as a "legal expert and businessman".

Unlike football, however, one bad season was enough to ruin his entire theatre project financially, but due to his strong moral code about not leaving workers, artists, and employees on the street, Ormaechea made the difficult decision of acting against the law and embezzle 1,768,039 million pesetas from the CGD in October 1933, an action that he assumed with full responsibility when he was discovered. He thus ended up in prison after making some payments with public money. The court ruled that said "sums had to be returned either by its responsible author, or by his heirs.

In 1944, Ormaechea was involved in the correspondence related to the premiere of the "Peñamariana" play.

== Death ==
Ormaechea was still alive in 1948, but the date of his death remains unconfirmed.
