= Duke of Maura =

- Creation date: 19 June 1930
- Created by: Alfonso XIII
- First holder: Gabriel Maura, 1st Duke of Maura
- Present holder: Ramiro Pérez-Maura, 5th Duke of Maura
- Heir apparent: Julia Gabriela Pérez-Maura de Cabanyes, 9th Countess of Mortera
- Remainder to: Heirs of the body of the grantee
- Subsidiary titles: Count of Mortera
- Status: Extant

Duke of Maura (Spanish: Ducado de Maura) is a hereditary title of Spanish nobility, accompanied by the dignity of Grandee. It was created on 19 June 1930 by King Alfonso XIII in favor of Gabriel Maura Gamazo, historian and politician, to honor the late Antonio Maura y Montaner, five times prime minister of Spain.

The marriage of the 1st Duke of Maura to Julia de Herrera y Herrera, 5th Countess of La Mortera, united both titles in the same family; thus, the title of Count of Mortera has been used as the official title of the heirs of the Dukedom.

== Creation ==
On June 20, 1930, the Gaceta de Madrid published the following Royal Decree:

On the advice of the Minister of Grace and Justice and, after hearing my Council of Ministers, I hereby decree the following:

Article 1. In order to honor the memory of Mr. Antonio Maura y Montaner, a title of the Kingdom is hereby created, bearing the name of Duke of Maura, accompanied by the dignity of Grandee, which is granted to Mr. Gabriel Maura y Gamazo, for himself, his children, and legitimate successors.

Article 2. The Government shall submit the appropriate draft law to the Cortes, so that this grant may be deemed free of charge.

— ALFONSO, Royal Decree 1,572 of 19 June 1930.

== Dukes of Maura ==
- Gabriel Maura Gamazo, 1st Duke of Maura (1930–1963)
- Ramón Maura de Herrera, 2nd Duke of Maura (1963–1968)
- Gabriela Maura de Herrera, 3rd Duchess of Maura (1969–1972)
- Ramiro Pérez-Maura Herrera, 4th Duke of Maura (1973–2001)
- Ramiro Pérez-Maura de la Peña, 5th Duke of Maura (since 2003)

== Line of succession ==
- Gabriel Maura y Gamazo, 1st Duke of Maura (1879–1963)
  - Ramón Maura y Herrera, 2nd Duke of Maura, 6th Count of Mortera (1912–1968)
  - Gabriela Maura y Herrera, 3rd Duchess of Maura (1904–1972)
    - Ramiro Pérez-Maura de Herrera, 4th Duke of Maura, 7th Count of Mortera (1934–2001)
      - Ramiro Pérez-Maura y de la Peña, 5th Duke of Maura, 8th Count of Mortera (b. 1963)
        - (1). Julia Gabriela Pérez-Maura de Cabanyes, 9th Countess of Mortera (b. 1998)
        - (2). María Pérez-Maura de Cabanyes (b. 2000)
        - (3). Lucía Pilar Pérez-Maura de Cabanyes (b. 2004)
