= Barceló =

Surname of Catalan language origin

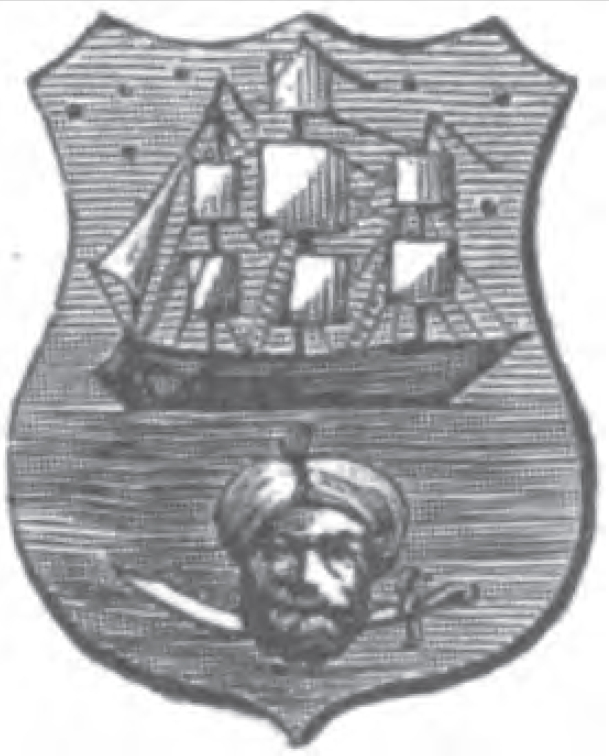
Barceló coat of arms. (Majorca branch).

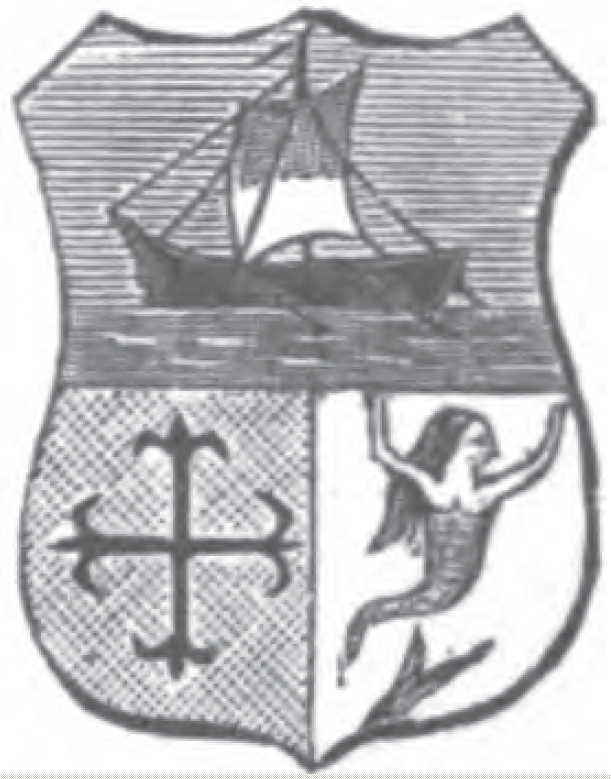
Barceló coat of arms. (Catalonia branch).

Barceló is a Catalan surname, which originally appeared in Montpellier (Lords of Montpellier), today Languedoc-Roussillon (Southern France) then established in other Crown of Aragon areas like the Balearic Islands (circa 1232) or Catalonia, and finally extended to the rest of Spain and its old territories beyond Europe in America (particularly the Caribbean) and Asia. Variants exist in other languages, e.g. Barcelo and Barsalou in French.

== People with the surname ==
- Antonio Barceló (1717–1797), Spanish mariner and Admiral of the Spanish Armada
- Clara Barceló, a fictional character in Carlos Ruiz Zafón's novel The Shadow of the Wind
- Elia Barceló (born 1957), Spanish-Austrian writer
- Hélène Barcelo (born 1954), mathematician from Québec
- José Luis Barceló (born 1959), Colombian lawyer and academic
- Lorenzo Barceló (born 1977), Dominican Major League Baseball pitcher
- Miquel Barceló (writer) (1948–2021), Spanish editor, writer and professor
- Miquel Barceló (born 1957), Spanish painter
- Rich Barcelo (born 1975), American golf player
- Roxanne Barcelo (born 1985), Filipina actress
- Víctor Manuel Barceló (born 1936), Mexican politician
- Maria Gertrudis Barceló (1800–1852), Mexican entrepreneur and gambler
- Antonio Rafael Barceló (1868–1938), Puerto Rican politician
- Carlos Romero Barceló (1932–2021), Puerto Rican politician, grandson of Antonio

== See also ==
- Barsalou, a French surname

== Bibliography ==
The Barcelo Name in History
