= Luis Rubiales =

Spanish football player and executive (born 1977)

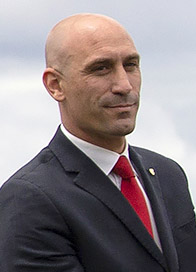
- Rubiales in 2018

UEFA Vice-President
- In office 29 May 2019 – 10 September 2023
- President: Aleksander Čeferin
- Vice President: Karl-Erik Nilsson (as first vice-president)

26th President of Royal Spanish Football Federation
- In office 27 May 2018 – 10 September 2023
- Preceded by: Ángel María Villar; Juan Luis Larrea (interim)
- Succeeded by: Pedro Rocha

5th President of Association of Spanish Footballers
- In office 22 March 2010 – 20 November 2017
- Preceded by: Gerardo Movilla
- Succeeded by: David Aganzo

Personal details
- Born: Luis Manuel Rubiales Béjar; 23 August 1977 (age 49) Las Palmas, Spain
- Height: 1.80 m (5 ft 11 in)
- Occupation: Footballer; Football administrator
Association football career
- Position: Defender
Youth career
- 1991–1993: Motril
- 1993–1995: Valencia
- 1995–1997: Atlético Madrid
Senior career*
Years	Team	Apps	(Gls)
1997–1999	Guadix	46	(10)
1999–2000	Mallorca B	30	(1)
2000–2001	Lleida	35	(0)
2001–2003	Xerez	55	(0)
2003–2008	Levante	85	(0)
2008–2009	Alicante	15	(0)
2009	Hamilton Academical	3	(0)
Total		269	(11)
- * Club domestic league appearances and goals

Luis Manuel Rubiales Béjar (born 23 August 1977) is a Spanish former football official and professional player who played as a defender, appearing in 53 La Liga matches over three seasons. He was the president of the Royal Spanish Football Federation (RFEF) and one of UEFA's vice-presidents. On 10 September 2023, Rubiales resigned from his post in the wake of a scandal involving Jenni Hermoso at the 2023 FIFA Women's World Cup final award ceremony. He is banned from all football activities for three years. On 3 April 2024, Rubiales was arrested in Madrid as part of a corruption investigation about the relocation of the Spanish Super Cup to Saudi Arabia.

== Early life ==
Rubiales was born in Las Palmas on the Canary Islands to father Luis Manuel Rubiales López, a primary school teacher and mother Ángeles Béjar, a hairdresser. He was raised in Motril in the Province of Granada.

== Playing career ==
Rubiales spent the majority of his playing career in the Segunda División, representing Guadix, Mallorca B, Lleida, Xerez, Levante (gaining promotion to La Liga in 2004 and 2006) and Alicante CF. He was primarily deployed as a central defender and became a regular squad member at Levante during the 2000s. He made his debut in the Spanish top flight on 29 August 2004, coming on as a late substitute in a 1–1 away draw against Real Sociedad. Overall, he appeared in 53 La Liga matches over three seasons.

On 4 August 2009, it was announced Rubiales had agreed a one-year deal at Scottish Premier League side Hamilton Academical. However, after his third league appearance, in which he was named man of the match, he announced his retirement at the age of 32, returning to Spain to take up a backroom role at Levante.

== Administrative career ==
=== AFE President ===
In March 2010, Rubiales was elected president of the Association of Spanish Footballers (AFE). He quit his post in November 2017 with the intention of running for office at the Royal Spanish Football Federation.

=== RFEF President ===
Rubiales was elected as the RFEF president in May 2018. Upon taking office he vowed to establish a fixed wage for the leaders of the regional federations (hitherto the exception rather than the norm), thereby endowing each of the entities with €100,000 for their professionalisation. Dissenting voices within the RFEF reportedly silenced thereafter.

One of Rubiales' first actions as president was to dismiss Julen Lopetegui, head coach of the Spanish men's national team, immediately prior to the 2018 FIFA World Cup in June 2018. The dismissal came after Lopetegui failed to inform the RFEF that he was negotiating to become the new manager of Real Madrid, a position he assumed in August of that year.

On 8 September 2018, Rubiales gave an interview in which he criticised the Spanish League president Javier Tebas for signing a contract that would see matches being played in the United States. The former explained that the deal was "worthless" without the Spanish Federation's approval.

On 18 April 2022, the Spanish digital newspaper El Confidencial published some leaked documents and audio files that they called Supercopa Files, which included conversations that took place in 2019 between Rubiales and the footballer and businessman Gerard Piqué. The audio files find Rubiales negotiating to pay Piqué commissions related to playing the Supercopa de España in Saudi Arabia. One of the conditions for these commissions was that two of the four participating teams would need to be Barcelona (Piqué's club at the time) and Real Madrid. Rubiales would also benefit from these commissions due to the variable part of his salary in the federation.

In 2022, Rubiales' uncle and former chief of staff Juan Rubiales accused Luis Rubiales of embezzlement of RFEF money, allegedly spent on private parties with a group of friends in a house in Salobreña in 2020. He has also been accused of using federation resources for his personal enjoyment, such as a trip to New York in 2018 accompanied by a Mexican painter. Juan Rubiales also accused his nephew of devising an espionage scheme against AFE president David Aganzo.

In December 2022, Rubiales filed a lawsuit against Wikipedia demanding that content on the Spanish Wikipedia which might be seen as damaging to his honour be removed. The complaint was filed through the legal department of the RFEF. The lawsuit focuses on Wikipedia content about scandals including negotiations for the sale of the Supercopa de España to Saudi Arabia said to involve commissions and personal benefits, and derogatory WhatsApp postings about teams in the Spanish league.

On 25 March 2023, the RFEF recognised 1937 Copa de la España Libre winners Levante FC, now replaced by Levante UD, as the equivalent of winning the Copa del Rey. Rubiales then handed the trophy to the 2023 captain of Levante, Vicente Iborra, before their match against Real Zaragoza on 31 March.

==== 2023 Women's World Cup incidents ====
After Spain won the Women's World Cup in August 2023, Rubiales assaulted Jennifer Hermoso by forcibly kissing her on the lips during the medal presentation; Hermoso later indicated during her Instagram live stream that she did not like the kiss. In the locker room, he reportedly put his arm around her and said: "There, we will celebrate the wedding of Jenni and Luis Rubiales" in Ibiza.

Rubiales was earlier spotted grabbing his crotch while standing in the authorities' box near Queen Letizia and her 16-year-old daughter Infanta Sofía. Rubiales subsequently faced widespread criticism for his celebrations, including from American footballer Megan Rapinoe. Spanish prime minister Pedro Sánchez also called for him to resign. Rubiales apologised for his conduct, stating that his celebrations were "in a moment of euphoria".

The AFE issued an official statement that if Rubiales did not resign immediately, they would demand that the Sports Law be applied against him. According to Grupo Vocento's Relevo, he reportedly begged Hermoso to appear next to him in an apology video, while Jorge Vilda made several unsuccessful requests to Hermoso's family for her to come out in support of Rubiales. The RFEF also sent to EFE an incorrect statement saying Hermoso condoned Rubiales' behaviour. Acting through her players' union FUTPRO, Hermoso asked the RFEF, without directly mentioning Rubiales, "to ensure the rights of [FUTPRO] players and to take exemplary measures".

Liga F filed a complaint before the High Sports Council (CSD) asking for his disqualification. The worldwide representative organisation for professional footballers, the Fédération Internationale des Associations de Footballeurs Professionnels (FIFPRO), called for immediate action and investigation of his actions under the FIFA code of ethics. The RFEF announced that it would hold an emergency Extraordinary General Assembly on 25 August. Meanwhile, on 24 August, the FIFA Disciplinary Committee opened disciplinary proceedings against him.

Although it was expected by the press that Rubiales would be resigning during the emergency Extraordinary General Assembly of the RFEF on 25 August, he instead refused to resign and said: "A social assassination is taking place. I don't deserve this manhunt I have been suffering." Rubiales also spoke to Jorge Vilda about his desire to offer the manager a new 4-year contract on €0.5 million a year.

On the same day, two Spanish men's national team and Real Betis players, Héctor Bellerín and Borja Iglesias, criticised Rubiales on social media, with the latter refusing to play for Spain until Rubiales resigned. Two former Spain national goalkeepers, 2010 world champion Iker Casillas and David de Gea, also criticised Rubiales' speech on X.

On 25 August 2023, the Spanish government filed a complaint in the Sports Administrative Court for "serious misconduct" with the aim of obtaining authorisation to suspend him from his duties. Later that day, 81 players, including all 23 from the championship-winning squad, released a joint statement pledging to boycott the national team until there were changes to RFEF leadership.

A friendly football event in support of Rubiales named Amigos de Luis Rubiales ("Luis Rubiales' Friends") featuring CF Motril, CD Costa Tropical, and Puerto de Motril was set for 26 August 2023 in Motril, with Rubiales' confirmed attendance. The Ayuntamiento of Motril brought the initiative down by declining to lease the municipally owned venue Escribano Castilla Stadium on the basis of potential disturbances of public order.

On 26 August 2023, the FIFA Disciplinary Committee provisionally suspended Rubiales for 90 days, and directed him and the RFEF to refrain from attempting to contact Hermoso directly or indirectly.

On 28 August, his mother, Angeles Bejar, went on hunger strike in a church in Motril as a protest against the "inhumane and bloody hunt that they are doing with my son". Rubiales' cousin, Vanessa Ruiz, accused the media of harassment and said that Rubiales had been "judged before his time". The same day, the Spanish Prosecution Ministry opened a preliminary investigation against Rubiales which, among other things, granted Hermoso the opportunity to file a legal complaint.

Rubiales' salary, which reached US $688,462.06 (€634,518.19) in 2021, as well as his right to have an official car from the RFEF, were cancelled. He was also requested to return his corporate laptop and phone, and will be blocked from using RFEF's funds to pay for his legal defence.

In an interview with El Confidencial published on 30 August, his uncle and former colleague Juan Rubiales described Luis as someone obsessed with power, luxury, money and women, adding that the latter's behaviour was embarrassing and that he needed "a social re-education program".

On 1 September, a Spanish sports court opened an administrative investigation into Rubiales. However, the probe was filed as a "serious misconduct" not a "very serious misconduct", which blocked the Spanish government from suspending him as head of the RFEF pending the investigation, and could potentially allow his return to RFEF's presidency when FIFA's 90-day provisional suspension ends.

On 6 September, Hermoso filed a criminal complaint against Rubiales. The complaint would be presented to the National Court two days later.

On 10 September, he resigned his positions as the Federation's president and as vice-president of UEFA.

On 30 October 2023, Rubiales was banned by the FIFA Disciplinary Committee from engaging in any football-related activities at both national and international level for a period of three years. On 17 November 2023, the legal panel that oversees sports in Spain issued a similar three year ban as well, preventing Rubiales from being employed with the sport while in Spain. It was also reported that a Spanish judge was investigating Rubiales as a result of accusations made by Hermoso that he sexually assaulted her with the kiss and then pressured her to publicly support him afterward.

On 6 December 2023, FIFA published a report which accused Rubiales of also inappropriately touching two English football players, as well as three additional Spanish football players, during the night of the World Cup. The report claimed that Debbie Hewitt, the chairwoman of the English Football Association, told FIFA’s disciplinary committee that Rubiales “cupped and stroked the face of the English player Laura Coombs, which [the chairwoman of the FA] thought was slightly odd and then he seemingly forcefully kissed the English player Lucy Bronze on her face.” Hewitt also claimed she witnessed Rubiales tap the bottom of another Spanish player. According to FIFA, Rubiales responded by claiming Hewitt's portrayal of him was "disgusting" and that she told blatant "lies" and was "speaking from ignorance." He also claimed her overall statement “does a disservice to her position as chair of the English FA.” However, FIFA rejected his assessment of Hewitt and found no reason to doubt her.

FIFA's Disciplinary committee described Rubiales as having "inexcusable and unacceptable behavior" and stated that “it was tempted to impose more severe sanctions in view of the seriousness and gravity of the incidents at stake as well as of the profound negative impact that the Respondents actions had on the image of FIFA, women’s football and women’s sport in general." However, the report also claimed that "with strong hesitations, the Disciplinary Committee was satisfied that the imposition of such a measure would serve the necessary deterrent effect upon the Respondent."

In February 2025, it was revealed Rubiales would face trial in Madrid over the incident. On 20 February 2025, he was found guilty of sexual assault over the incident, but acquitted of coercion. He was ordered to pay a fine of €10,000, and was ordered to stay at least 200 meters away from Hermoso and to not contact her for 12 months. On 25 June 2025, Rubiales lost his appeal against the sexual assault conviction at the Spanish appeals court who also dismissed a separate appeal from prosecutors, who had sought a retrial and were pushing for a jail sentence.

==== Spanish Super Cup corruption investigation ====
Police searched Rubiales' home in Spain, as well as RFEF's headquarters, as part of a corruption investigation related to a deal, reportedly worth 40 million euros, about the relocation of Spanish Super Cup competition to Saudi Arabia. Rubiales was in the Dominican Republic at the time the search was carried out. However, his Dominican Republic home was searched later.

On 3 April 2024, Rubiales was arrested by officials in Madrid upon his arrival from the Dominican Republic.

== Personal life ==
Rubiales married lawyer Manuela Delicado Vega, with whom he had three daughters. They later separated, but reportedly remained on good terms.

In November 2025, Rubiales published a book, Killing Rubiales; at the launch event for the book, he was egged, by an assailant that Rubiales later claimed was his uncle.

== Honours ==
Levante

- Segunda División: 2003–04

Sporting positions
Preceded by Juan Luis Larrea	President of the Royal Spanish Football Federation; 2018–2023	Succeeded by Pedro Rocha (interim)
