= Julián Olave =

Spanish football manager and sports leader

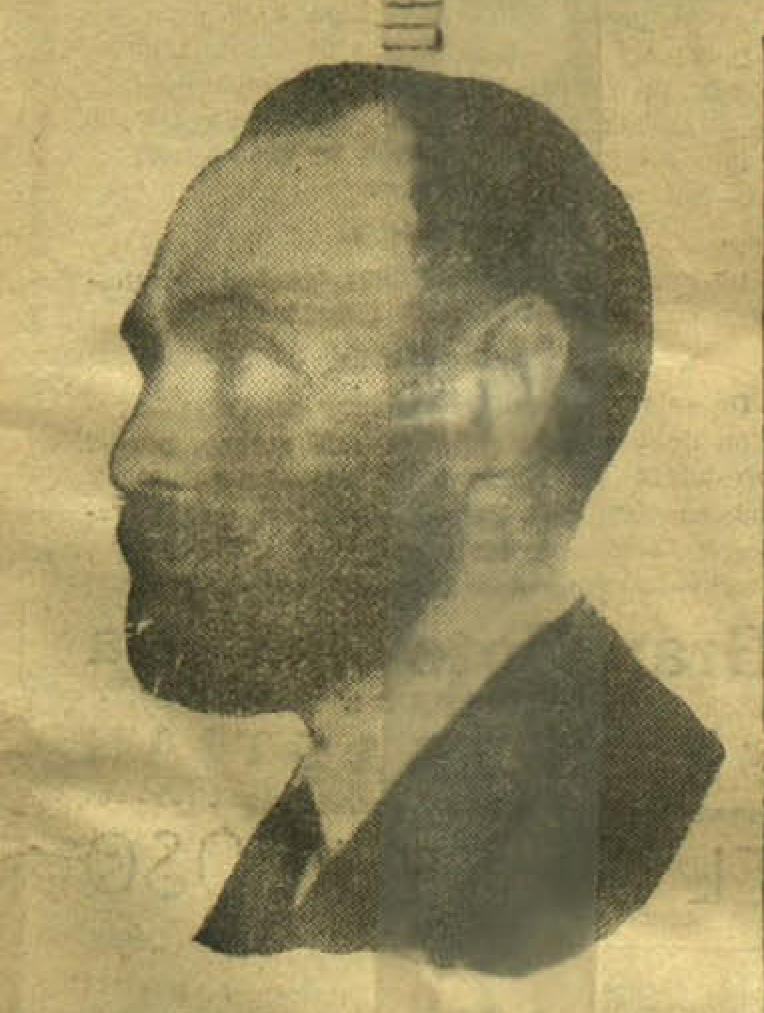

Personal information
- Full name: Julián Eustasio Olave Videa
- Date of birth: 29 March 1884
- Place of birth: Bilbao, Biscay, Spain
- Date of death: 2 April 1932 (aged 48)
- Place of death: Madrid, Spain

Managerial career
- Years: Team
- 1924: Spain (1)
President of the Spanish Football Federation
In office 1924–1926
Preceded by	Gabriel Maura
Succeeded by	Antonio Bernabéu

Julián Eustasio Olave Videa (29 March 1884 – 2 April 1932) was a Spanish sports leader who presided over the Spanish Football Federation between 1924 and 1926 and also a football Manager who co-directed one match of the Spanish national team in 1924. As the president of the RFEF, he signed the Declaration of Professionalism in 1924 and its implementation in 1926, and he was also the first Spaniard to join the FIFA Committee in 1925.

== Biography ==
Although born on 29 March 1884 in Bilbao, his sporting career began in 1910, as technical secretary of the Real Sociedad, since he had his automobile representation business in the city of San Sebastián. When he was the vice-president of the club, he was one of the promoters and founders of the Unión Española de Clubes de Fútbol (UECF), which was created as an alternative to the FECF, the current Royal Spanish Football Federation, and which was on the verge of wrecking the structure of Spanish football. He was elected secretary of this entity, and as such, when FIFA did not accept the coexistence of two federations, he signed a letter to FECF proposing to reach a merger agreement between the two federations. An agreement was eventually reached in September, with the basis for unification being signed by the presidents of the two entities in dispute, Olave and Ricardo Ruiz Ferry.

The Spanish Union officially disappeared in 1914, but it always remained as a de facto power in the shadows, reappearing when the Spanish National League was created in 1928, postulating a rather elitist tournament, and later in 1933–34 supporting the group of the so-called "speakers", but on both of these occasions, Olave was now on the opposite trench. In 1924, in one of those turbulent assemblies, he was elected the 5th president of the Spanish Football Federation, a position that he held for two years until his resignation in 1926, being replaced by Antonio Bernabéu. In those years of so much turmoil within Spanish football, Olave was a figure of enormous relief and importance.

Notably, Olave was the one who signed the Declaration of Professionalism in 1924 and its implementation in 1926. In his functions as president, Olave had the task of heading the Selection Committee of the Spanish national team, a triumvirate made up of himself, treasurer José Rosich, and secretary Luis Colina, so he provisionally served as national coach in a match against Austria held at the Camp de Les Corts on 21 December 1924, which ended in a 2–1 victory thanks to goals from Antonio Juantegui and Josep Samitier. In March 1927, he was invited to become the president of the federation again, but he instead offered to serve Spanish football in a lower step than the one he had occupied a few months before, thus being reconstituted as treasurer. In 1928, he had no hesitation in coming to the aid of the then president, Pedro Díez de Rivera y Figueroa, to put order in the federation finances.

In the 1910s he was one of the first translators of the football regulations into Spanish. He was the first Spaniard to join the FIFA Committee in 1925, under the presidency of Jules Rimet. The 1929 FIFA Congress, which was held in Barcelona, was attended by a Spanish delegation formed by Olave, Rosich, and Ricardo Cabot, and its most important point was the discussion of the regulations of the upcoming inaugural FIFA World Cup in 1930, and Spain was the first to withdraw its candidacy to host the tournament in order to donate support to Montevideo, the "most Spanish city among all the Spanish capitals of South America".

== Death ==
Olave died in Madrid on 2 April 1932, at the age of 48.
