= José Luis Barceló =

Colombian lawyer (born 1959)

José Luis Barceló Camacho

President of the Supreme Court of Justice of Colombia
- In office 25 January 2018 – 29 April 2019
- Preceded by: Rigoberto Echeverry
- Succeeded by: Álvaro Fernando García Restrepo

Personal details
- Born: 1959 (age 66–67)
- Education: Nueva Granada Military University
- Occupation: Lawyer, academic
- Known for: President of the Supreme Court of Justice of Colombia (2018–)

José Luis Barceló Camacho (born 1959) is a Colombian lawyer and academic, former president of the Supreme Court of Justice of Colombia.

== Personal life ==
Barceló was born to José Barceló from Spain, and Lilia Camacho from Boyacá. Barceló and his first wife had a daughter Sonia Carolina, who died in 2003 aged 17.

== Career ==
Barceló is a graduate of the Nueva Granada Military University in Bogotá, Colombia. Barceló joined the Supreme Court of Justice of Colombia in 1991, and has worked as Criminal Examining Judge of Bogotá and Advocate Counsel of the Second Delegate Procurator for the Criminal Function. From 2011 to 2018, he worked for the Criminal Chamber of the Supreme Court, including working as assistant magistrate to Fernando Arboleda Ripoll. In January 2018, Barceló was appointed as president of the Supreme Court of Justice of Colombia, replacing Rigoberto Echeverry. He began the role in June 2018. Barceló is currently also a professor of the Specialisation in Constitutional Criminal Procedure and Military Justice of the Nueva Granada Military University.
