= Miquel Barceló (writer) =

Spanish editor, translator, and writer (1948–2021)

Miquel Barceló (1948 – 22 November 2021) was a Spanish editor, translator and writer, who specialized in the science fiction genre.

== Career ==
He was born in Mataró, Spain, in 1948. He studied towards a PhD in Computing, Aeronautics Engineering, graduating in nuclear energy.

He worked as an editor for Ediciones B, where he directed the NOVA collection, specialized in science fiction tales and novels, and writing introductory articles for the books published in the collection.

His last academic position was as a professor at the Polytechnic University of Catalonia (UPC) where he promoted the creation of the UPC Prize, the most important prize in Spanish science-fiction. He directed and coordinated the UPC Doctorate program on Sustainability, Technology and Humanism. He also kept a monthly column for the computer magazine "Byte" and contributed to several publications on Astronomy and Artificial Intelligence.

In 1996, the Spanish Association of Fantasy and Science Fiction awarded a lifetime achievement award to Barceló.

He lived in Sant Cugat del Vallès (Barcelona).

== Bibliography ==
- El otoño de las estrellas (Short novel, 2001), with Pedro Jorge Romero.
- Testimoni de Narom (Short novel, 1998), with Pedro Jorge Romero. Winner of the 2005 Prize Narrativa de Ciencia Ficción Julio Verne of Andorra.
- Ciencia ficción: Guía de lectura (Essay, 1990).
- Cuentos de ciencia ficción (Anthology, 1998) with Pedro Jorge Romero.
- Paradojas en la ciencia ficción II (Essay, 2005).
