= Charles Bouvard =

French physician

Charles Bouvard (1572 in Montoire – 25 October 1658) was a French chemist and physician. Bouvard served as the physician of France's King Louis XIII (as successor of Jean Héroard) and as the superintendent of the Jardin des Plantes in Paris.

== Biography ==
Bouvard was himself a son of a physician from his native city who taught him his profession in Bouvard's earliest childhood, yet died when Bouvard was still a small child leaving him an orphan Recognising his skill, he was brought up by Marin Liberge, a professor at the famous university of Angers which was to be his Alma mater and the place where he received his doctor title in 1604. Shortly thereafter he came to Paris where he became a professor at the Collège Royal. Bouvard was known for using his knowledge of plants to create a number of medicines from common ordinary flowers. The flower Bouvard is most closely associated with is the evergreen herb and shrub genus Bouvardia. Bouvard also wrote the Historicae Hodiernae Medicinae Rationalis Veritatis, a book defending medical rationalism, in 1655.

Charles Bouvard was a close friend of Joseph Barsalou (physician) (1600–1660). Through their correspondence they shared ideas on medicine and treating patients with plants.
