= New Granada Military University =

University based in the city of Bogotá, Colombia

- Motto: Scientiae, patriae et familiae
- Motto in English: Science, Country, Family
- Type: Public, National
- Established: 1982
- Rector: BG (R) Hugo Rodríguez Durán
- Students: 22.850 (2012)
- Location: Bogotá, Cundinamarca, Colombia; 4.68307°N 74.0419°W
- Campus: Urban and Campus of Cajicá 75.5 hectare
- Colors: Yellow, Blue and Red
- Nickname: UMNG
- Website: http://www.umng.edu.co

The New Granada Military University (Spanish: Universidad Militar Nueva Granada), also called UMNG or Unimilitar, is a public university, self-funded, national university based in the city of Bogotá, Colombia. The university has 8 faculties, 20 undergraduate, 66 graduate programs, 9 master's degrees, 44 Diploma and 52 research programs. The university offers academic programs for part-time (also referred as "distance") education, being one of the most important nationally.

In 2005 the university acquired a campus of 80 hectare in Cajicá being the third largest Latin American, this campus is being used to build new facilities for the university in order to house almost more than 30,000 students.

== Characteristics and location ==
The university currently has three branches. Headquarters is located in Bogotá, at the junction of the hundred street with race Once, and the Faculty of medicine is located next to the Central Military Hospital in the transverse third with street forty and nine equally in the city of Bogotá. A new campus is under construction on the outskirts of the city of Cajicá

== History ==
The history of the university can be traced to 1962 when the Military School of Officers "José María Cordova" (Spanish: Escuela Militar de Cadetes "José María Córdova") started offering Civil Engineering, Economics and Law programs to the second lieutenants of the institution supplementary to the last two years of their professional education. In 1978, as a result of the idealistic conception of a sector of the medical staff at the Central Military Hospital, the School of Medicine and Health Sciences was founded, beginning its labor in the first semester of 1979.

The university starts its development in full in 1980 when the decree-law 84/80 was issued granting the institution with the status of a university center, a special administrative unit ascribed to the Ministry of Defense. Its directorate was set up on the grounds of the Military School, the academic under direction in an old house in front of the Patria High School, and the administrative under direction in offices located at the Military School of Medicine.

Resolution 12975 of July 23, 1982 recognized the center as a university under the name of Universidad Militar "Nueva Granada". ACT 30 of 1992, by means of which the public education is ruled, in its article 137 stated that the Universidad Militar "Nueva Granada" which provides higher education programs, shall continue ascribed to the corresponding entity - Ministry of National Defense - and shall work in accordance to its legal status - Special Administrative Unit - adjusting its academic regime to the terms of the aforementioned law.

In January 1984, the university moved to its present location in Bogotá, Colombia (carrera 11 No. 101-80), a strategic area of the city, where a financial center of prime importance emerges, as well as other entities of the defense sector.

As of March 2003, through ACT 805 of said year, the university modifies its legal status constituting itself as an autonomous university entity of a national order with a special organic regime, whose main goal deals with higher education geared to academically support the Military Forces, the National Police and the Defense Sector, and all its active or retired members, their families and the civilians in general.

== Faculties and academic programs ==
=== Faculty of Medicine ===
Undergraduate degrees

- Medicine
- Premedical

Graduate degrees

- Specialization in Anesthesiology
- Specialization in Cardiology
- Specialization in Coloproctology
- Specialization in Spine Surgery
- Specialization in Hand and Upper Limb Surgery
- Specialization in General Surgery
- Specialization in Oral and Maxillofacial Surgery
- Specialization in Pediatric Surgery
- Specialization in Ocular Plastic Surgery
- Specialization in Reconstructive and Aesthetic Plastic Surgery
- Specialization in Reconstructive Surgery and Hip and Knee Joint Replacement
- Specialization in Vascular Surgery and Angiology
- Specialization in Dermatology
- Specialization in Endocrinology
- Specialization in Gastroenterology
- Specialization in Gynecology and Obstetrics
- Specialization in Hematology and Clinical Oncology
- Specialization in Laryngology and Upper Airway
- Specialization in Critical Medicine and Intensive Care
- Specialization in Physical Medicine and Rehabilitation
- Specialization in Internal Medicine
- Specialization in Nephrology
- Specialization in Neonatology
- Specialization in Pneumatology
- Specialization in Neurosurgery
- Specialization in Pediatric Neurology for Pediatric Specialists
- Specialization in Pediatric Neurology
- Specialization in Neurology
- Specialization in Ophthalmology
- Specialization in Orthopedics and Traumatology
- Specialization in Otology
- Specialization in Otorhinolaryngology
- Specialization in Pathology
- Specialization in Pediatrics
- Specialization in Psychiatry
- Specialization in Radiology and Diagnostic Images
- Specialization in Rheumatology

=== Faculty of Law General Luis Carlos Camacho Leyva ===
Undergraduate degrees

- Law

Graduate degrees

- Specialization in Penalty Law
- Specialization in Human Rights and Protection Systems
- Specialization in Criminal, Constitutional Procedure and Military Justice
- Specialization in Administrative Rights
- Master in Criminal Procedure Law
- Master in Administrative Law

=== Faculty of Science ===
Undergraduate degrees

- Applied and Computational Mathematics
- Applied Biology
- Associate Degree in Horticulture

Graduate degree

- Master of Applied Biology
- Doctorate in Applied Ciences

=== Faculty of Engineering ===
Undergraduate degrees

- Mechatronics Engineering
- Civil Engineering
- Multimedia Engineering
- Telecommunication Engineering
- Industrial Engineering
- Associate Degree in Electronics and Communications

Graduate degrees

- Specialization in Comprehensive Project Management
- Specialization in Geomatics
- Specialization in Strategic Quality Management
- Specialization in Comprehensive Logistics Management
- Specialization in Pavement Engineering
- Specialization in Comprehensive Environmental Management
- Master in Comprehensive Project Management
- Master in Civil Engineering
- Master in Mechatronics Engineering
- Master in Comprehensive Logistics Management
- Doctorate in Engineering

=== Faculty of Economic Sciences ===
Undergraduate degrees

- Business Administration
- Public accounting
- Economy
- Associate Degree in Accounting and Tax

Graduate degrees

- Specialization in Senior Management
- Specialization in Internal Control
- Specialization in Finance and Public Administration
- Specialization in Administrative Development Management
- Specialization in Statutory Audit and International Audit
- Specialization in International Trade Management
- Master in Organization Management

=== Faculty of International Relations, Strategy and Security ===
Undergraduate degrees

- International Relations and Political Studies
- Administration of Occupational Safety and Health

Graduate degrees

- Specialization in Security Administration
- Specialization in Senior Security and Defense Management
- Master in International Relations and Business
- Master in Security and Risk Management

=== Faculty of Education and Humanities ===
Graduate degrees

- Specialization in University Teaching
- Master in Education
- Doctorate in Bioethics

=== Faculty of Distance Studies ===
Undergraduate degrees

- Business Administration
- Public Accounting
- International relations
- Civil Engineering
- Industrial Engineering
- Computer Science

Graduate degrees

- Specialization in Senior Management

== Campus ==
In 2005 New Granada Military University purchased a lot adjacent to the Hacienda Riogrande, areas for the construction of a campus.

Apart from administrative buildings and schools which have own Auditorium, internet room, classrooms and cafeterias, contemplates the execution of special buildings which are inserted to the educational work of the University according to the requirements of each program and to the preferences of each student. These buildings include: Church, Sports Center, library, main auditorium, headquarters, Aquatics Center, gym, IMA (Institute military aeronautical), concha acoustic circuit athletic Stadium, pitch softball, treatment plant sewage treatment of groundwater, solid waste treatment plant, plant treatment of waters of the Bogotá River, power plant, etc.)

== Publications and media ==
With the goal of expanding and diversifying access to knowledge, the UMNG has their own publications, such as the Neogranadine newspaper, In addition to his own books and indexed journals that makes available to the public.

== See also ==
- List of universities in Colombia
