= Carmela Silva =

Spanish politician, lawyer, and teacher (born 1960)

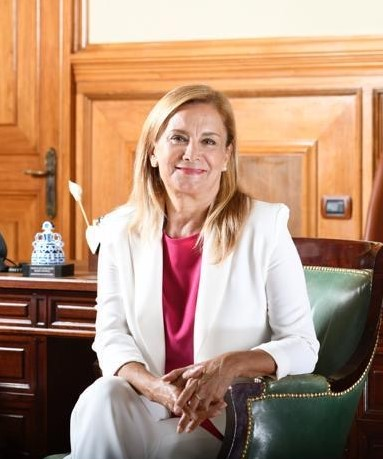

Personal details
- Born: María del Carmen Silva Rego; November 26, 1960 (age 65) Vigo, Pontevedra, Spain
- Party: PSOE (PSdeG-PSOE)
- Children: Iago Falque
- Occupation: Politician; lawyer; teacher

María del Carmen "Carmela" Silva Rego (born 26 November 1960) is a Spanish politician, lawyer, and teacher affiliated with the PSdeG-PSOE, the Galician branch of the Spanish Socialist Workers' Party. She served as senator for Pontevedra (2008–2011), becoming the first woman to serve as PSOE spokesperson in the Senate. She was president of the Provincial Deputation of Pontevedra from 2015 to 2023, the first woman to hold the position. She currently serves as senator for Pontevedra, president of the Senate's Budget Committee, First Deputy Mayor of Vigo, and president of the PSdeG-PSOE.

== Early life and education ==
Silva was born in the O Calvario neighbourhood of Vigo, Pontevedra, into a working-class family. She trained as a special education teacher and later obtained a degree in Economic Law from the University of Vigo.

== Political career ==
=== Congress and early career (2000–2008) ===
Silva served as a member of the Congress of Deputies for Pontevedra during the VII Legislature (2000–2004). She subsequently served as advisor to the Minister of Agriculture, Elena Espinosa, before being appointed non-elected councillor in charge of urban planning in the Ayuntamiento de Vigo under Mayor Abel Caballero in 2007.

=== Senate spokesperson (2008–2011) ===
In the 2008 Spanish general election, Silva was elected senator for the Province of Pontevedra. She was subsequently appointed PSOE spokesperson in the Senate, replacing Joan Lerma, becoming the first woman to hold this position within the Socialist parliamentary group. The appointment was proposed by PSOE Secretary of Organisation José Blanco, who announced the spokesperson position would go to a woman for the first time in the party's history.

=== Return to Congress (2011–2015) ===
In 2011, Silva led the PSOE list for Pontevedra in the general elections and was elected to Congress, where she served as Second Secretary of the Bureau of Congress. In February 2012, she joined the PSOE federal executive under Alfredo Pérez Rubalcaba as Secretary of Emigration. In mid-2012, she temporarily left political activity after being diagnosed with bladder cancer; she returned to her duties in early 2013.

=== President of the Diputación de Pontevedra (2015–2023) ===
On 17 July 2015, Silva was invested as president of the Provincial Deputation of Pontevedra with the support of 10 PSOE deputies and 4 from the BNG, ending 32 years of PP control of the institution. She replaced Rafael Louzán, who had served for twelve years. In her investiture speech, she quoted Bob Dylan's "The Times They Are a-Changin'" to mark the historic change. She subsequently resigned her Congress seat to focus on provincial governance. She began a second term on 3 July 2019, continuing the PSOE-BNG coalition.

Under her leadership, the Diputación created its first Equality Department, which implemented programmes such as the Escuela de Igualdad María Vinyals and the Violencia Zero campaign against gender-based violence through artistic actions in public spaces. She also promoted women's participation in STEM fields through partnerships with the University of Vigo, including the Cátedra Feminismos 4.0, a pioneering academic chair on feminism in the digital society.

=== Return to the Senate (2023–present) ===
In June 2023, Silva was confirmed as the PSOE's lead Senate candidate for Pontevedra in the July 2023 general elections. She was elected and in October 2024 was named president of the Senate's Budget Committee.

=== PSdeG-PSOE presidency ===
Silva has served as president of the PSdeG-PSOE since December 2021 and was reconfirmed in the position at the party's XV Congress in March 2025.

== Personal life ==
Silva's son, Iago Falque (born 1990), is a professional footballer who played for clubs including Torino, Roma, and Genoa in Serie A.
