= Palais du Mobilier Bonn Frères =

Building in Luxembourg City

Coordinates: 49.61131°N 6.12827°E

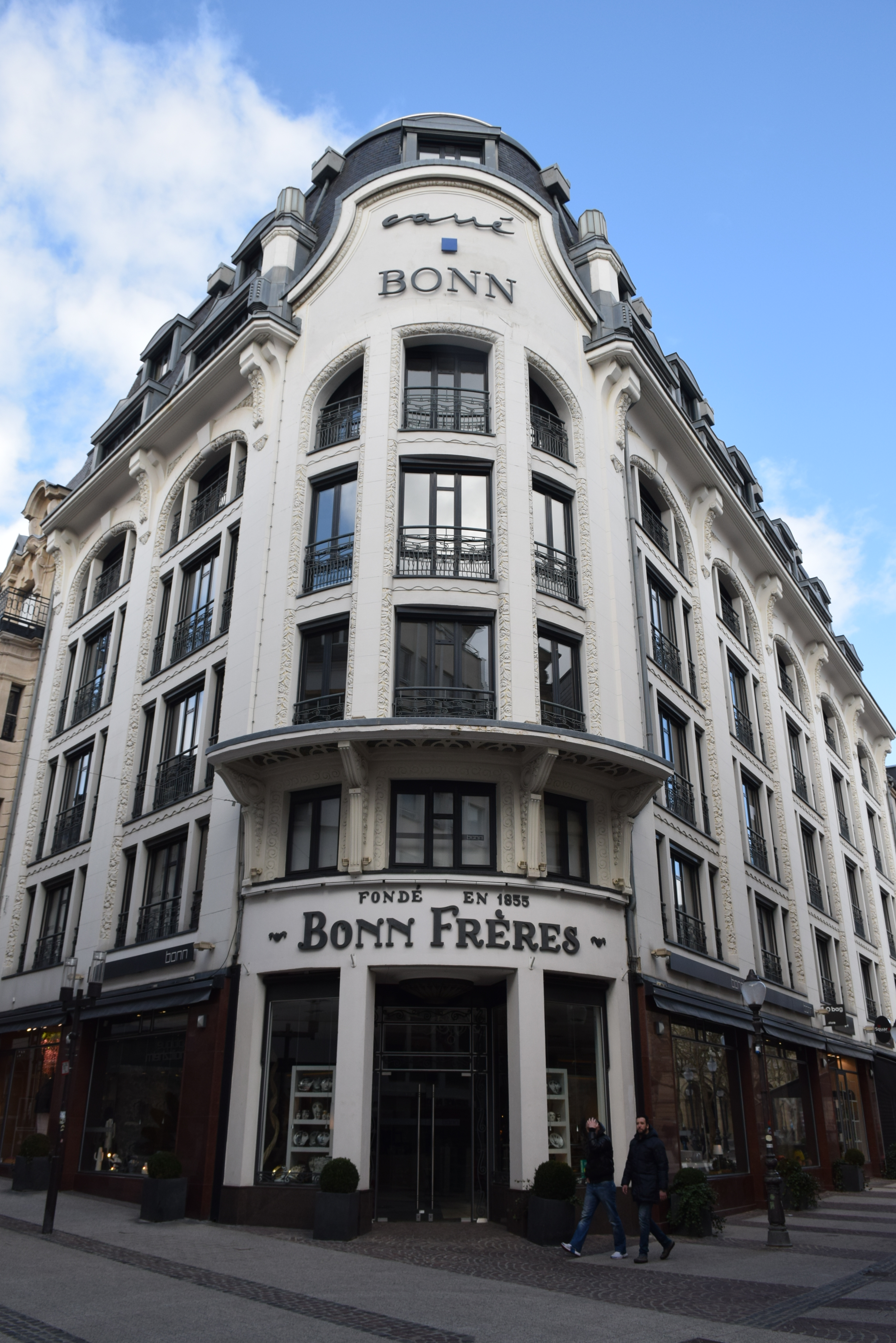
The Bonn Frères Furniture Showroom in central Luxembourg.

The Palais du Mobilier Bonn Frères (in English: Bonn Frères Furniture Showroom) is an Art Deco-style building in Luxembourg City, Luxembourg, designed by the architect Léon Bouvart (1883–1933) and built in 1925–26 by the contractor Achille Giorgetti for the Bonn family. It is listed as a cultural heritage monument.

== History ==
Stanislas Bonn (1833—1888) was a furniture merchant who quickly adapted to the industrialized methods of production during the mid-19th century, and opened a furniture store in Luxembourg in 1855. Originally, his business was located on Rue des Bains, but in 1860, he relocated to larger, more centrally located premises on Rue Philippe II. The furniture business expanded to occupy the entire building and was eventually named Bonn Frères, which was retained as the official name until 1994.

Ownership passed eventually to Mirtyl Bonn (1869–1956). Her daughter Gabrielle married Paul Lazard in 1928, and the building passed to the estate of the Lazard family. During World War II, Nazi occupiers seized the building, but the Lazard family reclaimed possession of the business and building afterwards.

== Building ==
The building has seven stories and, at the time of its opening, was the largest furniture store in Luxembourg. It was first renovated in 1967 and then again from 1990-94 to plans of the architectural firm Architecture et Environnement together with the architects Gilbert Huybrechts and Jean Herr. In the latter renovation the original structure was integrated with the houses neighboring it to both the left and right; a section called Carré Bonn housing offices was created on the upper floors, while the lower 3 levels are reserved for the furniture and decor business showroom.
