= Sports Administrative Court =

The Sports Administrative Court (Spanish: Tribunal Administrativo del Deporte, TAD) is an administrative body entrusted with ensuring compliance with the sports law in Spain. It is the ultimate administrative level in this area, and its decisions can be appealed before ordinary courts.

It is attached to the National Sports Council (CSD), although it acts independently of it. It was created in 2014 assuming the functions of the Spanish Sports Disciplinary Committee and the Electoral Guarantees Board.
