= Luis Argüello =

Luis Argüello may refer to:

- Luis Antonio Argüello (1784–1830), governor of Alta California
- Luis Argüello (bishop) (born 1953), Spanish archbishop
