= Antonio Bernabéu =

Spanish footballer, lawyer and politician (1890-1967)

Personal information
- Full name: Antonio Bernabéu de Yeste
- Date of birth: 19 April 1890
- Place of birth: Almansa, Spain
- Date of death: 1 July 1967 (aged 77)
- Place of death: Madrid, Spain
- Position: Forward

Senior career*
Years	Team	Apps	(Gls)
1909–1912	Bologna		
6th president of the RFEF
In office 1926–1927
Preceded by	Julián Olave
Succeeded by	Pedro Díez de Rivera
12th president of the National Committee of Referees
In office 1951–1952
Preceded by	Pedro Escartín
Succeeded by	Arturo Espinosa
- * Club domestic league appearances and goals

Antonio Bernabéu de Yeste (19 April 1890 – 1967) was a Spanish lawyer, politician, and footballer who played as a forward for Bologna, which he co-founded in 1909. He served as both the 10th president of the Spanish Football Federation between 1940 and 1941.

== Early life and education ==
Antonio Bernabéu was born on 19 April 1890 in Almansa, where his family lived, as the son of Antonia de Yeste Núñez and the lawyer José Bernabéu Ibáñez, administrator of the properties of the Marquis of Villafuerte and the Countess of Montealegre.

Between 1909 and 1912, Bernabéu was a student at the Collegio di Spagna a college for Spanish students at the University of Bologna, Italy.

== Sporting career ==
=== Football player ===
During his stay in Bologna, Bernabéu co-founded Bologna FC, and then played in their first-ever match, thus becoming its first-ever foreign player. He left the team after graduating in law; during his three years there, Bernabéu made 13 appearances and 8 goals for the rossoblù. The data still available today gives him as the goal scorer of the fifth match in Bologna's history (1–4), which was played on 19 February 1911 against Verona.

When he returned to Spain, he became manager of Real Madrid, where his younger brother Santiago was playing, going on to become the most important president in the club's history and to whom the stadium in the city is now named.

=== President of RFEF ===
In 1913, Bernabéu was elected as the secretary of Federación Española de Clubs de Football (FECF), the forerunner of the current Royal Spanish Football Federation (RFEF).

In 1926, Bernabéu was appointed as the 6th president of the RFEF (replacing Julián Olave), a position that he held for one year, until 1927, when Pedro Díez de Rivera replaced him. His presidency coincided with the professionalization of football in Spain, which resulted in a variety of complaints from the amateur clubs to the regional federations, who then redirected it to RFEF, so Bernabéu, overwhelmed by the copious paperwork generated by these endless cases and situations, decided to resign with the pretext of some urgent trips abroad.

== Political career ==
In the 1936 Spanish general election, Bernabéu, a lawyer by profession, was elected deputy for the Albacete constituency for the CEDA party with 75,351 votes.

== Death ==
Bernabéu died in Madrid in July 1967, at 77 years of age.

== Honours ==
Bologna

- Terza Categoria:
  - Winners: 1909–10
