= Joseph Barsalou (physician) =

French apothecary and physician

Joseph Barsalou (1600–1660) was a French apothecary and physician.

== Biography ==
Joseph Barsalou was born in Agen in the south west of France. He came from a family of apothecaries that was originally from Narbonne. Joseph Barsalou received no formal medical training. His father handed down his knowledge of herbs and minerals. It is through his friendship with the Scaliger family that Joseph Barsalou gained access to the library of Julius Caesar Scaliger and his son Joseph Justus Scaliger. Julius Caesar Scaliger was a physician, philosopher and commentator of Aristotle. His son Josephus Justus Scaliger was a scholar, linguist and historian. Joseph Barsalou built on his traditional knowledge of herbs with an introduction to medicine and philosophy reading Galen, Aristotle and Pythagoras.

Agen in the early 17th century was at the crossroads of the religious debate revolving around the new Protestant faith. The region favoured the Reformation. Nerac its neighbour and rival was the political and intellectual capital of French Protestants. The Edict of Nerac in 1579 had given the French Protestant 14 more protected towns and confirmed the Edict of Poitiers that recognised the religious rights of Protestants in France. Josephus Justus had been seduced by the Reformation and become one of its great scholars. Yet Joseph Barsalou's life took a different direction from his predecessor. Joseph Barsalou gravitated towards Avignon and Rome the centers of Roman Catholic Church.

As a physician Joseph Barsalou treated people in and around the town of Agen. With the many political and religious battles being fought nearby the region was rife with disease: tuberculosis, typhus, scurvy and other fevers. Many physicians actually died from being in contact with the patients they treated. Joseph Barsalou survived. Locally his reputation was built as much on treating others as surviving the contact with so many instances of disease. It testified to his skills as a physician.

Through his travels in the south of France he became acquainted with Philippe Jacques de Maussac, President of the Court of Montpellier. They remained close friends during their lives exchanging a number of letters. It is believed that it is Philippe Jacques de Maussac who introduced Joseph Barsalou to Antonio Barberini and the Italian leg of his journey.

In 1640 Joseph Barsalou was asked to treat Antonio Barberini, nephew of Pope Urban VIII and the Legate of Avignon who suffered from a fever on a visit to Avignon in the south of France. As Antonio Barberini's health was restored, he insisted on keeping Barsalou as his personal physician and took him to Paris and Rome.

During his time with Antonio Barberini, Barsalou was introduced to Charles Bouvard who had been physician of King Louis XIII of France and Superintendent of the Jardin du Roi in Paris the new medicinal garden of the king, now known as the Jardin des Plantes. Barsalou and Bouvard shared a common interest in medicine and herbal remedies. They exchanged ideas on recipes and treatments for a wide variety of conditions: tuberculosis, typhus, cholera and the plague.

Yet Joseph Barsalou's position in Rome was dependent on the power of the Barberini family. In 1644 he was called to assist Urban VIII on his death bed. With the enthronement of the new Pope Innocent X, and the subsequent disgrace of Barberinis for corruption and nepotism Barsalou lost favour and had to leave the papal city.

Between 1644 and 1649 Barsalou practiced in Florence, attending to the Grand Duke Ferdinando II de' Medici. At the time Florence was a hub of modern experimental knowledge. Ferdinando II was a patron of science and a student of Galileo himself, and founded the Academy of Experimentation in 1642 and attracts the brightest minds of the time. Scientists working there at the time include Evangelista Torricelli, Vincenzo Viviani and Giovanni Alfonso Borelli.

In 1650 he returned to Montpellier in France, where he took care of his lifelong friend Philippe Jacques de Maussac, who died that same year. Barsalou then went to Agen permanently and practiced in the region. He died in 1660.

== Methods ==
Barsalou's practice was influenced by Alchemical practice in addition to contemporary practices such as bloodletting. His later work was influenced by discussions with the Florentine scientists and their modern experimental practice.

Barsalou wrote to his friend Charles Bouvard about the experiments he carried out to create new elixirs. He tried to understand the healing properties of plants, minerals and metals. He perhaps found his inspiration in a broad range of ideas that circulate at the time, from the alchemical texts of Jabir to Fibonacci's work on numbers and Pythagorean principles amongst many others. In his letters he explained how he tried to understand the power of plants through numbers.

Despite this, Joseph Barsalou was not an alchemist: there is no reference in his letters to a quest for the philosopher's stone or the transmutation of metal into gold.

Apart from the letters to Charles Bouvard and de Maussac no compendium of his work survived him.
