= Henry K. Beecher =

American medical academic

- Born: Harry Unangst; February 4, 1904; Peck, Kansas, U.S.
- Died: July 25, 1976 (aged 72); Boston, Massachusetts, U.S.
- Education: University of Kansas (BA, MA), Harvard Medical School (MD)
- Scientific career
- Fields: Medical ethics Anesthesiology
- Notable students: Bjørn Aage Ibsen

Henry Knowles Beecher (February 4, 1904 – July 25, 1976) was a pioneering American anesthesiologist, medical ethicist, and investigator of the placebo effect at Harvard Medical School.

An article by Beecher's in 1966 on unethical medical experimentation in The New England Journal of Medicine — "Ethics and Clinical Research" — was instrumental in the implementation of federal rules on human experimentation and informed consent. A 1999 biography—written by Vincent J. Kopp, M.D. of UNC Chapel Hill and published in an American Society of Anesthesiologists newsletter—describes Beecher as an influential figure in the development of medical ethics and research techniques, though he has not been without controversy. The Beecher Prize, named in honor of Henry K. Beecher, is awarded annually by Harvard Medical School to a medical student who has produced exceptional work in the field of medical ethics. Also, the Henry K. Beecher Award by The Hastings Center was established in 1976 in honour of Henry K. Beecher, who was also its first recipient.

== Biography ==
=== Youth ===
Born as Harry Unangst in Peck, Kansas in 1904, he changed his surname to Beecher in his 20s. This change was said to be for the name recognition of influential 19th-century Beechers—preacher Henry Ward Beecher and author Harriet Beecher Stowe. He was, in fact, unrelated to the Beecher family.

=== Education ===
Beecher received a BA degree in 1926 and an MA degree in physical chemistry in 1927, both from the University of Kansas. While it had been his goal to earn a Ph.D. in chemistry at the Sorbonne, Henry was "persuaded" to study medicine instead. Entering the Harvard Medical School in 1928, Beecher received research fellowships in 1929, 1930 and 1931. Beecher graduated cum laude in 1932. Two of his articles published in the Journal of Applied Physiology in 1933 earned Warren Triennial Prizes. These two articles and a study in Beecher's last year of college caught the attention of Harvard Professor of Surgery, Edward Churchill, M.D., who became his professional mentor. Post-college, he trained for two years under Churchill at Massachusetts General Hospital. Henry traveled to Denmark in 1935 to work in the physiology laboratory of Nobel Laureate August Krogh.

=== Career ===
Returning to America in 1936, Beecher was hired as Anaesthetist-in-Chief at MGH and instructor in anaesthesia at Harvard Medical School by Dr. Churchill. Henry became an associate professor in 1939 and the Henry Isaiah Dorr Professor of Anaesthesia Research in 1941—the first endowed chair in anesthesiology in America.

During World War II, Beecher served in the U.S. Army with Dr. Churchill in North Africa and Italy. His experiences during the war in clinical pharmacology would inspire him to investigate placebo-like phenomena.

Work in medical ethics

As professor of anesthesiology at Harvard Medical School, Beecher published a 1966 article that drew attention to 22 examples of unethical clinical research that had risked patients' lives. Though heralded for the position of this article, he was severely criticized by the medical establishment for what was felt as an unfair generalization from a few select cases. However, this article and the subsequent congressional investigation laid the foundation for current guidelines on informed consent and human experimentation.

Report of the Ad Hoc Committee of the Harvard Medical School to Examine the Definition of Brain Death

Dr Beecher was the instigator and chairperson of an Ad Hoc Committee of the Harvard Medical School convened to examine the issue of irreversible coma. The resulting report is a foundation moment in defining the notion of brain death. The report continues to have significance for contemporary bioethical debates regarding brain death.

== U.S. Army interrogation drugs ==
In July 2007 the German public television channel SWR claimed that Beecher was involved with CIA studies on human drug experiments in the 1950s as a scientific expert, and may have contributed to the KUBARK Counterintelligence Interrogation document of 1963 based on his work in the United States and in secret CIA prisons in West-Germany.

According to these reports, and partly generated by interest in US historian Alfred W. McCoy's research , Beecher was scientifically responsible for human experiments with drugs (e.g. mescaline) conducted by the CIA in post-war West-Germany. These experiments took place in a secret CIA prison located in "Villa Schuster" (later renamed to "Haus Waldhof") in Kronberg near Frankfurt, a dependency of the nearby US interrogation center in Camp King (West-Germany). According to a witness, several interrogated individuals died during these experiments. According to sources Beecher visited Camp King frequently from September 1951 onwards and prepared human experiments, deliberated with the interrogation staff of the CIA (called "the rough boys") and recommended various drugs for testing. Allegedly, he also met former Nazi physician Walter Schreiber several times, both at Camp King as well as in Villa Schuster, for an "exchange of ideas". Later, Beecher described Schreiber in a report as "intelligent and cooperative."

The aforementioned documentary states, based on documents sourced from the United States National Archives, that the US Army had sent reports about Nazi experiments in concentration camps like Dachau to Beecher for evaluation. One of the reports Beecher evaluated is still extant in the library of Harvard Medical School.

According to the German documentarian Egmont R. Koch, in January 1953, Beecher recommended that a depressive patient at the New York State Psychiatric Institute and Hospital be given a mescaline injection. The injection took place at 9:53, with the patient falling into a deep coma at 11:45 and dying within half an hour after that.

According to the neuroanesthesiologist George A. Mashour:

It may appear paradoxical that Beecher, who advocated the ethical treatment of human subjects, had also engaged in potentially unethical work on hallucinogens for the government. A more compelling hypothesis, however, is that Beecher advocated ethical treatment of human subjects largely because of such work.

== The placebo effect ==
Henry K. Beecher's 1955 paper The Powerful Placebo was not the first to introduce the idea of the placebo effect (the term had been first used by T. C. Graves in 1920),, but its importance was that it stressed—for the first time—the necessity of double-blind, placebo-controlled clinical trials. In his 1955 paper, Beecher only speaks of placebo effects on specific occasions when he is contrasting them with drug effects. His 1955 paper constantly and correctly speaks of "placebo reactors" and "placebo non-reactors"; furthermore, Beecher (1952), Beecher, Keats, Mosteller, and Lasagna (1953), Beecher (1959), consistently and correctly speak of "placebo reactors" and "placebo non-reactors"; they never speak of any "placebo effect"; and, finally, in his Research and the Individual: Human Studies (1970), Beecher simply speaks of "placebos".

== Notable students ==
- Bjørn Aage Ibsen, Danish anesthesiologist and founder of intensive-care medicine.

== Works ==
=== Journal articles ===
- Beecher, H.K., Ethics and Clinical Research. New England Journal of Medicine. June 1966 Reprinted with commentary by Harkness, Lederer and Wikler. in Bull World Health Organ 2001
- Beecher, H.K., Ethics and experimental therapy. Journal of the American Medical Association 186(9): 858–9,(30 Nov 1963) (Editorial)
- Beecher, H.K., Sheik Adhith. Experimentation in man. Journal of the American Medical Association, 1959, 169 (5): 461–478.
- von Felsinger J.A., Lasagna L., Beecher H.K. The response of normal men to lysergic acid derivatives (di- and mono-ethyl amides). Journal of Clinical and Experimental Psychopathology, 1956; 17:414-428.
- Lasagna L., von Felsinger J.M., Beecher H.K. Drug-induced mood changes in man. 1. Observations on healthy subjects, chronically ill patients, and "postaddicts." Journal of the American Medical Association, 1955: 157:1006-1020.
- Beecher, H.K., The Powerful Placebo, Journal of the American Medical Association, Vol.159, No.17, (24 December 1955).
- Beecher, H.K., Keats, A.S., Mosteller, F. & Lasagna, L. The Effectiveness of Oral Analgesics (Morphine, Codeine, Acetylsalicylic Acid) and the Problem of Placebo "Reactors" and "Non-Reactors", Journal of Pharmacology and Experimental Therapeutics, Vol.109, No.4, (December 1953).
- Beecher, H.K., Experimental Pharmacology and Measurement of the Subjective Response, Science, Vol.116, No.3007, (15 August 1952).

=== Papers ===
- Beecher HK. Ethics and the explosion of human experimentation, 1965. In the Beecher papers, Francis A. Countway Library of Medicine, Harvard University.

=== Books ===
- Beecher, H.K., Research and the Individual: Human Studies, Little, Brown, (Boston), 1970. ISBN 0-7000-0168-9
- Beecher, H.K., Measurement of Subjective Responses: Quantitative Effects of Drugs, Oxford University Press, (New York), 1959.

== Additional sources ==
- John Marks, The Search for the "Manchurian Candidate": The CIA and Mind Control (New York: Norton, 1991).
- McCoy, Alfred. Torture and Impunity: The U.S. Doctrine of Coercive Interrogation (University of Wisconsin Press, 2012).
- Rothman R., Strangers at the bedside: a history of how law and bioethics transformed medical decision making. New York, Basic Books, 1991
- The Henry K. Beecher collection at The Center for the History of Medicine, Countway Library, Harvard Medical School
