= Joseph Barsalou (businessman) =

Canadian businessman and politician

Joseph Barsalou (5 December 1822 – 17 May 1897) was a businessman and politician from Montreal, Lower Canada.

== Biography ==
Barsalou had an early beginning in business with an apprenticeship in auctioneering at the age of 15. He quickly advanced in business and by 1853 was a partner in Benning and Barsalou, an enterprise mainly in auctioneering with some activity in real estate. He went on to other business ventures and bought a company with two partners which became the Canadian Rubber Company (now Uniroyal), and was its first president. The core of his business activities was the soap factory he founded with his sons in 1875 at the corner of rue Durham (now rue Plessis) and Ste-Catherines, which licensed soap recipes and brand names from a number of firms over the years, including the Tête de Cheval brand and Savon Barsalou.

He was also involved in a number of other business ventures and owned, through his firm, at one time or another, many key properties in Montreal. He was a major figure in the Montreal business community in the late 19th century, and he financed or played a role in much of the industrial development of the city at that time.

He participated in municipal politics in Montreal as well, running unsuccessfully for alderman in 1873 against Ferdinand David, and later playing a key role in the establishment of the city of Maisonneuve (now part of Mercier–Hochelaga-Maisonneuve), for which he was mayor from 1884 to 1889 and from 1890 to 1892.

Barsalou's daughter Hortense was married to Montreal mayor, Senator, and Conservative Party cabinet minister Alphonse Desjardins.
