= 1914–15 FC Barcelona season =

16th season in existence of FC Barcelona

FC Barcelona
1914–15 season
- President: Àlvar Presta (until September); Joaquim Peris de Vargas
- Manager: Jack Greenwell
- Campionat de Catalunya: Vice-champion
- Copa Gamper: Champion

The 1914–15 season was the 16th season for FC Barcelona.

== Events ==
Immersed in an internal crisis, the club is in the hands of Vice President Joaquim Peris de Vargas until, on 29 June 1915, Rafael Llopart arrives at the presidency and carries out a renewal of positions. Filipino Paulino Alcántara becomes the top scorer for the first time.

== Squad ==
Note: Flags indicate national team as defined under FIFA eligibility rules; some limited exceptions apply. Players may hold more than one non-FIFA nationality.

No.	Pos.	Nation	Player
83	GK	ESP	Luis Bru
95	GK	ESP	Luis Renyé
99	GK	ESP	Francisco Aramburo
88	DF	ESP	Eduardo Reguera
77	DF	PHI	Manuel Amechazurra
77	DF	PHI	Luis Tudó
77	DF	PHI	Joan Barba
88	DF	ESP	Pere Molins
67	MF	ESP	Andreu Ponsà
67	MF	ESP	Ramón Torralba
88	MF	ESP	Alfredo Massana
88	MF	ESP	Eugenio Terré
62	MF	ESP	Josep Costa
62	MF	ESP	Rafael Morales
98	MF	ESP	Isidro Corbinos
—	MF	ESP	Manuel Castejón
—	FW	ESP	Josep Segarra

No.	Pos.	Nation	Player
—	MF	ESP	Enrique Peris
—	MF	ENG	Jack Greenwell
—	FW	ESP	Gabriel Bau
—	FW	ESP	Casimiro Mallorquí
—	FW	PHI	Paulino Alcántara
—	FW	ESP	Antonio Morales
—	FW	ENG	Percival Wallace
—	FW	ESP	Francisco Vinyals
—	FW	ESP	Francisco Baonza
—	FW	ESP	Salvador Hormeu
—	FW	ESP	Domingo Espelta
—	FW	ESP	Miquel Oller
—	FW	ESP	José Julià
—	FW	ESP	Augusto Ozores
—	FW	ARG	Romà Forns

== Results ==
Friendly

16 August 1914	FC Barcelona	2 - 1	FC Internacional	Badalona
	Hormeu; Baonza			Referee: Alsina

30 August 1914	FC Barcelona	6 - 0	Club T.B.H.	Barcelona
	A.Morales; Hormeu; Mallorqui			Stadium: Industria; Referee: Molins

6 September 1914	FC Barcelona	5 - 1	FC Internacional	Barcelona
	Alcantara; Bau			Stadium: Industria; Referee: Gibert

8 September 1914	FC Barcelona	2 - 0	FC Internacional	Barcelona
	Bau; Peris			Stadium: Industria; Referee: Armet

13 September 1914	FC Barcelona	6 - 1	FC Internacional	Barcelona
	Alcantara; Arnau; A.Morales			Stadium: Industria; Referee: Amechazurra

1 November 1914	FC Barcelona	3 - 4	Real Unión Club de Irun	Barcelona
	Costa; Mallorqui; Peris			Stadium: Industria; Referee: Sampere

2 November 1914	FC Barcelona	0 - 0	Real Unión Club de Irun	Barcelona
				Stadium: Industria; Referee: Bau

22 November 1914	FC Barcelona	3 - 0	L'Avenç de l'Sport	Barcelona
	Peris; Mallorqui; Baonza			Stadium: Industria; Referee: Corbinos

6 December 1914	FC Barcelona	1 - 1	RCD Español	Barcelona
	Mallorqui			Stadium: Industria; Referee: Forns

8 December 1914	RCD Español	0 - 3	FC Barcelona	Barcelona
			Peris; Segarra; Tarre	Stadium: Espanyol; Referee: S.Massana

25 December 1914	FC Barcelona	4 - 0	Plumstead FC	Barcelona
	Castells; Segarra; Bau			Stadium: Industria; Referee: Forns

27 December 1914	FC Barcelona	4 - 0	Plumstead FC	Barcelona
	Reguera; Tarre; P.Wallace			Stadium: Industria; Referee: Alcantara

31 January 1915	Athletic Club	1 - 1	FC Barcelona	Bilbao
			Mallorqui	Stadium: San Mames; Referee: Arzuaga

2 February 1915	Athletic Club	5 - 0	FC Barcelona	Bilbao
				Stadium: San Mames; Referee: Arzuaga

19 March 1915	FC Barcelona	2 - 3	Real Sociedad de Fútbol	Barcelona
	Alcantara			Stadium: Industria; Referee: Gibert

21 March 1915	FC Barcelona	2 - 0	Real Sociedad de Fútbol	Barcelona
	Greenwell; Segarra			Stadium: Industria; Referee: Marti

28 March 1915	Club Atlético de Madrid	2 - 1	FC Barcelona	Madrid
			Torralba	Referee: Sócrates Quintana

11 April 1915	FC Barcelona	7 - 0	Universitary SC	Barcelona
	Tarre; Alcantara; Mallorqui			Stadium: Industria; Referee: Baro

25 April 1915	FC Barcelona	4 - 1	FC Internacional	Barcelona
	Tarre; Alcantara; Segarra			Stadium: Industria; Referee: Baro

13 May 1915	FC Barcelona	11 - 1	FC Català	Barcelona
	Mallorqui; Castells; Hormeu			Stadium: Industria; Referee: Vidal

23 May 1915	FC Barcelona	4 - 2	Athletic Club	Barcelona
	Peris; Tarre; Alcantara			Stadium: Industria; Referee: Marti

24 May 1915	FC Barcelona	2 - 1	Athletic Club	Barcelona
	Peris; Reguera			Stadium: Industria; Referee: Marti

30 May 1915	FC Barcelona	2 - 3	FC Internacional	Barcelona
	Tarre; Alcantara			Stadium: Industria; Referee: Reguera

27 June 1915	FC Barcelona	0 - 0	Universitary SC	Barcelona
				Stadium: Industria; Referee: Tallada

4 July 1915	CE Sabadell FC	1 - 3	FC Barcelona	Sabadell
			Mallorqui; Greenwell; Vinyals	Referee: Garriga

11 July 1915	FC Barcelona	3 - 0	CE Sabadell FC	Barcelona
	Mallorqui; Alcantara			Stadium: Industria; Referee: Aramburo

12 July 1915	FC Barcelona	4 - 0	Racing Club de Madrid	Barcelona
	Mallorqui; Alcantara			Stadium: Terrassa; Referee: Hamilton

Copa Gamper

15 November 1914 Finale	FC Barcelona	4 - 1	FC Internacional	Barcelona
	A.Morales; Mallorqui; P.Wallace; Greenwell			Stadium: Industria; Referee: Torres Ullastres

Copa Barcelona

6 June 1915	FC Barcelona	1 - 3	FC Espanya	Barcelona
	Segarra			Stadium: Industria; Referee: Sampere

20 June 1915	RCD Español	2 - 1	FC Barcelona	Barcelona
			Alcantara	Stadium: Espanyol; Referee: Palomera

Campionat de Catalunya

18 October 1914	FC Barcelona	2 - 0 suspended	L'Avenç de l'Sport	Barcelona
	Alcántara; Costa			Stadium: Camp del carrer Indústria; Referee: Palomera

25 October 1914 repeat previous day	FC Barcelona	3 - 1	L'Avenç de l'Sport	Sabadell
	Vinyals 15'; Peris; Bau 85'		Torruella 17'	Stadium: Camp de la Creu Alta; Referee: Palomera

8 November 1914	FC Barcelona	4 - 0	CS Sabadell	Barcelona
	Segarra; Bau; Alcántara			Stadium: Velòdrom Parc d'Sports; Referee: Sanpere

29 November 1914	FC Barcelona	1 - 0	Universitary SC	Barcelona
	Wallace			Stadium: Velòdrom Parc d'Sports; Referee: Pomés

13 December 1914	RCD Español	2 - 1	FC Barcelona	Barcelona
	López		Wallace	Referee: Arévalo

20 December 1914	FC Barcelona	7 - 0	Català SC	Barcelona
	Segarra; Bau; A. Morales			Stadium: Camp de l'Hospital Clínic; Referee: Comas

10 January 1915	FC Barcelona	3 - 0	Club T.B.H.	Barcelona
	Segarra; Bau			Stadium: Camp de lel carrer Entença / València; Referee: Boneguen

17 January 1915	FC Barcelona	not play	FC Badalona	Barcelona

14 February 1915	FC Barcelona	3 - 2	FC Internacional	Barcelona
	Segarra; Mallorquí; Alcántara		Raich	Referee: Millet

22 February 1915	FC Barcelona	2 - 1	FC Espanya	Barcelona
15:30	Tarré		Villena	Referee: Aguirreche

7 March 1915 Finale	RCD Español	4 - 0	FC Barcelona	Terrassa
	López 10' 15'; Tormo 17'			Stadium: Velòdrom de Pi i Maragall; Referee: Domènech
