= List of FC Barcelona presidents =

Futbol Club Barcelona is a football club based in Barcelona, Catalonia, Spain, that competes in La Liga, the most senior football league in Spain. Since its founding in 1899, the club has had 41 different presidents. The club is owned by the club-members of Barcelona and La Liga board of trustees, and similarly to a limited liability company, they elect the president by a ballot. The president has the responsibility for the overall management of the club, including formally signing contracts with players and staff. In Spain, it is customary for the president to watch the games in which the first-team participates, together with the president from the opposing team.

== History ==
On 22 October 1899, Swiss sportsman Joan Gamper placed an advertisement in the Los Deportes newspaper declaring his wish to form a football club in the city. A positive response resulted in a meeting at the Gimnasio Solé on 29 November which eleven men attended, including Walter Wild, later to become the first president of the club, and Bartomeu Terradas, who became the second president. As a result of this meeting, Barcelona was formed.

In 1908, Gamper became club president for the first time, taking over the presidency to save the club from extinction. The club had not won anything since the Campionat de Catalunya in 1905, and as a result was experiencing severe financial difficulties. Gamper was subsequently club president on five occasions between 1908 and 1925 and spent 26 years with the club. One of his main achievements was to help Barça acquire its own stadium and thus a way of generating stable income. An annual pre-season competition, the Joan Gamper Trophy, has been held in his honour since 1966.

The team won six Campionat de Catalunya titles between 1930 and 1938, but success at national level (with the exception of the 1937 disputed title) evaded them. From the formation of La Liga until 1978, Barcelona had 20 different presidents, meaning each presidential period lasted on average two-and-a-half years. In 1978, Josep Lluís Núñez became the first elected president of Barcelona, and ever since members of the club have elected the club president. The process of electing a president of Barcelona was closely tied to Spain's transition to democracy in 1974 and the end of Franco's dictatorship. Núñez's main objective was to develop Barça into a world-class club by giving it stability both on and off the pitch. His presidency lasted for 22 years, making him the longest-serving president.

After the departure of Núñez in 2000, his vice-president through the 22 years of his tenure, Joan Gaspart took over the club. During his presidency of the club, the team won no trophies and, after two-and-a-half years, Gaspart resigned his position on 12 February 2003, with the team in 15th place, two points above the relegation zone. Enric Reyna was elected as temporary president until the board resigned on 5 May 2003. Hereafter, an interim commission presided until the general elections were held. On 15 June 2003, Joan Laporta entered office, and was the most successful president in terms of Champions league trophies. The club won the Champions League twice within three years and completed an "unprecedented sextuple" by winning the 2008–09 La Liga, the 2008–09 Copa del Rey, the 2009 Supercopa de España, the 2008–09 UEFA Champions League, the 2009 UEFA Super Cup and the 2009 FIFA Club World Cup.

On 13 June 2010, Sandro Rosell was elected president of Barcelona with more than 60% of the vote of Barça's club members, and he formally took over the presidency on 1 July 2010. He resigned in 2014 as a result of a scandal involving the signing of Neymar.

Josep Maria Bartomeu replaced Rosell on January 23, 2014, before resigning in October 2020. A management commission led by Carles Tusquets took over, until Joan Laporta was elected for a second time on 7 March 2021 with over 54% of the vote.

== List of presidents ==
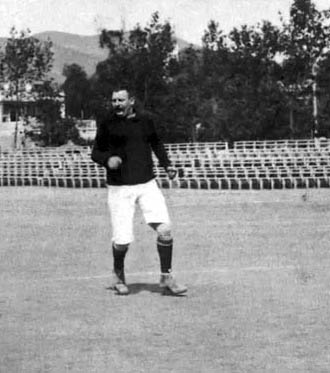
Joan Gamper was Barcelona's founder and one of the first players.

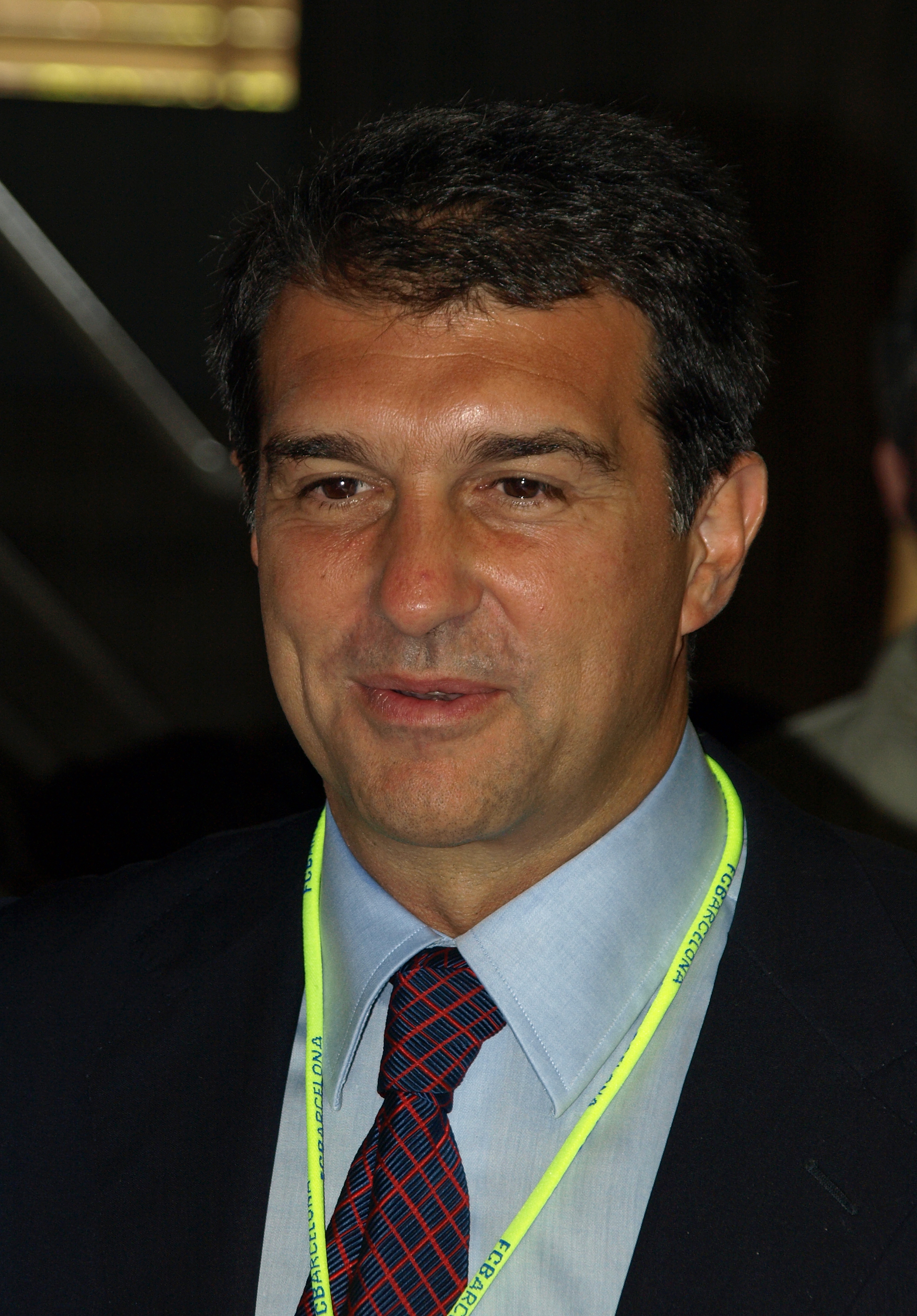
Joan Laporta is the current president, having been elected in March 2021. He was re-elected as President after 2026 elections. He previously served between 2003 and 2010, and is the most successful president in terms of trophies won per year.

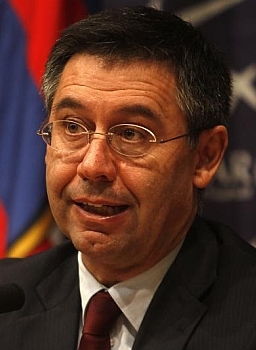
Josep Maria Bartomeu, the previous president from 2014 until his resignation in October 2020, won 13 trophies in his tenure as president.

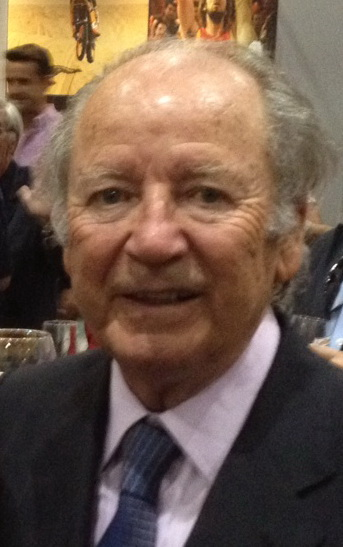
Josep Lluís Núñez was the most successful president with a total of 27 trophies won.

Below is the official presidential history of Barcelona, from when Walter Wild took over at the club in 1899 until the present day.

FC Barcelona Presidents
Name	Nationality (Note: The information in the nationality column is according to how they were then referred to, and may not reflect their then, or current, citizenship or birthplace.)	From	To	Honours (total number)
Walter Wild	(Switzerland) Swiss	29 November 1899	25 April 1901	
Bartomeu Terradas	(Spain) Spanish	25 April 1901	5 September 1902	
Paul Haas	(German Empire) German	5 September 1902	17 September 1903	
Arthur Witty	(England) English	17 September 1903	6 October 1905	
Josep Soler	(Spain) Spanish	6 October 1905	16 October 1906	
Juli Marial	(Spain) Spanish	16 October 1906	11 November 1908	
Vicente Reig	(Spain) Spanish	11 November 1908	2 December 1908	
Joan Gamper	(Switzerland) Swiss	2 December 1908	14 October 1909	
Otto Gmeling	(German Empire) German	14 October 1909	17 November 1910	1 Copa del Rey (1)
Joan Gamper	(Switzerland) Swiss	17 November 1910	30 June 1913	2 Copa del Rey (2)
Francesc de Moxó	(Spain) Spanish	30 June 1913	30 July 1914	
Àlvar Presta	(Spain) Spanish	30 July 1914	29 September 1914	
Joaquim Peris de Vargas	(Spain) Spanish	29 September 1914	29 June 1915	
Rafael Llopart	(Spain) Spanish	29 June 1915	25 June 1916	
Gaspar Rosés	(Spain) Spanish	25 June 1916	17 June 1917	
Joan Gamper	(Switzerland) Swiss	17 June 1917	10 June 1919	
Ricard Graells	(Spain) Spanish	10 June 1919	27 June 1920	1 Copa del Rey (1)
Gaspar Rosés	(Spain) Spanish	27 June 1920	17 July 1921	
Joan Gamper	(Switzerland) Swiss	17 July 1921	29 July 1923	1 Copa del Rey (1)
Eric Cardona	(Spain) Spanish	29 July 1923	1 June 1924	
Joan Gamper	(Switzerland) Swiss	1 June 1924	17 December 1925	1 Copa del Rey (1)
Arcadi Balaguer	(Spain) Spanish	17 December 1925	23 March 1929	2 Copa del Rey (2)
Tomàs Rosés	(Spain) Spanish	23 March 1929	30 June 1930	1 La Liga (1)
Gaspar Rosés	(Spain) Spanish	30 June 1930	22 October 1931	
Antonio Oliver	(Spain) Spanish	22 October 1931	20 December 1931	
Joan Coma	(Spain) Spanish	20 December 1931	16 July 1934	
Esteve Sala	(Spain) Spanish	16 July 1934	27 July 1935	
Josep Sunyol	(Spain) Spanish	27 July 1935	6 August 1936	
Managing Commission	N/A	6 August 1936	6 May 1939	
Joan Soler	(Spain) Spanish	6 May 1939	13 March 1940	
Enrique Piñeyro	(Spain) Spanish	13 March 1940	10 July 1942	1 Copa del Rey (1)
Josep Vidal-Ribas	(Spain) Spanish	10 July 1942	13 August 1942	
Enrique Piñeyro	(Spain) Spanish	13 August 1942	20 August 1943	
Josep Antoni de Albert	(Spain) Spanish	20 August 1943	20 September 1943	
Josep Vendrell	(Spain) Spanish	20 September 1943	20 September 1946	1 La Liga, 1 Copa Eva Duarte (2)
Agustí Montal Galobart	(Spain) Spanish	20 September 1946	16 July 1952	3 La Liga, 2 Copa del Rey, 2 Copa Eva Duarte (7)
Enric Martí Carreto	(Spain) Spanish	16 July 1952	22 September 1953	1 La Liga, 1 Copa del Rey, 1 Copa Eva Duarte (3)
Francesc Miró-Sans	(Spain) Spanish	22 September 1953	28 February 1961	2 La Liga, 2 Copa del Rey, 2 Fairs Cup (6)
Enric Llaudet	(Spain) Spanish	28 February 1961	17 January 1968	1 Copa del Rey, 1 Fairs Cup (2)
Narcís de Carreras	(Spain) Spanish	17 January 1968	18 December 1969	1 Copa del Rey (1)
Agustí Montal Costa	(Spain) Spanish	18 December 1969	18 December 1977	1 La Liga, 1 Copa del Rey (2)
Raimon Carrasco	(Spain) Spanish	18 December 1977	1 July 1978	1 Copa del Rey (1)
Josep Lluís Núñez	(Spain) Spanish	1 July 1978	23 July 2000	7 La Liga, 6 Copa del Rey, 2 Copa de la Liga, 5 Spanish Supercup, 1 European Cup, 4 Cup Winners' Cup, 2 UEFA Super Cup (27)
Joan Gaspart	(Spain) Spanish	23 July 2000	12 February 2003	
Enric Reyna	(Spain) Spanish	12 February 2003	6 May 2003	
Managing Commission	N/A	6 May 2003	15 June 2003	
Joan Laporta (Note: From 30 June 2006 to 22 August 2006, Barcelona was controlled by a managing commission.)	(Spain) Spanish	15 June 2003	1 July 2010	4 La Liga, 1 Copa del Rey, 3 Spanish Supercup, 2 Champions League, 1 UEFA Super Cup, 1 FIFA Club World Cup (12)
Sandro Rosell	(Spain) Spanish	1 July 2010	23 January 2014	2 La Liga, 1 Copa del Rey, 3 Spanish Supercup, 1 UEFA Champions League, 1 UEFA Super Cup, 1 FIFA Club World Cup (9)
Josep Maria Bartomeu	(Spain) Spanish	23 January 2014	27 October 2020	4 La Liga, 4 Copa del Rey, 2 Spanish Supercup, 1 UEFA Champions League, 1 UEFA Super Cup, 1 FIFA Club World Cup (13)
Carles Tusquets (interim) (Note: From 29 October 2020 to 7 March 2021, Barcelona was controlled by a managing committee with Carles Tusquets having the role of President of the Managing Committee.)	(Spain) Spanish	29 October 2020	7 March 2021	
Joan Laporta	(Spain) Spanish	7 March 2021	9 February 2026	2 La Liga, 2 Copa del Rey, 3 Spanish Supercup (7)
Rafa Yuste (interim)	(Spain) Spanish	9 February 2026	1 July 2026	
Joan Laporta	(Spain) Spanish	1 July 2026		
