= José Vidal-Ribas =

Spanish businessman, tennis player, and sports leader

- Born: José Vidal-Ribas Güell; 27 February 1888; Barcelona, Catalonia, Spain
- Died: 21 June 1959 (aged 71); Barcelona, Catalonia, Spain
- Citizenship: Spanish
- Occupations: Businessman; Tennis player; Sports leader
- Known for: President of FC Barcelona
- Children: 13

6th President of the Real Club de Tenis Barcelona
- In office 1920–1929
- Preceded by: Francesc de Moxó
- Succeeded by: Alfonso Macaya

President of the Catalan Tennis Federation
- In office 1921–1923
- Preceded by: Jorge Barrié
- Succeeded by: José María Sagnier

2nd President of the Spanish Tennis Federation
- In office 1924–1928
- Preceded by: Jorge Barrié
- Succeeded by: José María Sagnier

President of FC Barcelona
- In office 10 July 1942 – 13 August 1942
- Preceded by: Enrique Piñeyro
- Succeeded by: Enrique Piñeyro

José Vidal-Ribas Güell (27 February 1888 – 21 June 1959) was a Spanish businessman, tennis player, and sports manager, who presided over several important entities, such as the Real Club de Tenis Barcelona from 1920 to 1929, the Royal Spanish Tennis Federation from 1924 to 1929, and FC Barcelona for a month in 1942.

== Early and personal life ==
José Vidal-Ribas was born in Barcelona on 27 February 1888, into a family of merchants and businessmen of the Catalan bourgeoisie, which was started by his grandfather José Vidal Ribas, who made a fortune thanks to the African slave trade business in North America and Cuba, so much so that in 1868, he became the ninth largest taxpayer in Barcelona, leaving an inheritance of several properties spread throughout the city, including a small Neoclassical palace on Passeig de Gràcia known as Casa Vidal Ribas. His uncle José (1848–1892), was a councilor of Barcelona and a real estate investor, while his father Emilio was involved in the pharmaceutical and industrial drugstore trade, under the company name Hijos de José Vidal Ribas.

Vidal-Ribas married Emilia Zaragoza Cavanna (1892–1974), and the couple had 13 children: Ricardo (1914–1972), Manuel (1916–1961), Mercedes (1917–1995), Carlos (1920–1980), Lucia (1922–1990), Maria Josefa (1923–1942), Lourdes (1924–2008), Juan (1926–1991), Alvaro (1928–2012), Ana Maria (1930–2020), Maria Rosa (1930–), Marisol (1932–2011), and José Antonio (1936–1982).

== Business career ==
When Francisco Franco's troops entered Barcelona in 1939, Vidal-Ribas was appointed president of the board of directors of the Caja de Pensiones, assuming all of its executive functions.

Vidal-Ribas was also vice president of the Barcelona Chamber of Commerce in 1948, and in the mid-1950s, he led a group of Barcelona businessmen in an unsuccessful initiative to promote an World's fair in the city.

== Sporting career ==
=== Tennis ===
After hanging up his racket, Vidal-Ribas was appointed the 6th president of the Real Club de Tenis Barcelona in 1920 (replacing Francesc de Moxó), a position that he held for nine years, until 1929, when he was replaced by Alfonso Macaya. He combined this role with the presidency of federative bodies, first of the Catalan Tennis Federation, between 1921 and 1923, during which he promoted the celebration of the first World Indoor Tennis Championship at the Palacio de la Industria in Barcelona in 1923, and then of the Spanish Tennis Federation, from 1924 until 1928, when he was replaced by José María Sagnier. As such, he was the captain of the Spain Davis Cup team in the quarterfinals of the 1926 International Lawn Tennis Challenge against Argentina in Barcelona, which ended in a 3–1 victory.

As treasurer of the Spanish Olympic Committee (COE), Vidal-Ribas promoted the "Manifesto to the country", an initiative aimed at raising funds to cover the participation of Spanish athletes in the 1924 Olympic Games in Paris.

=== FC Barcelona ===
After the Spanish Civil War ended in 1939, the sporting authorities of the Franco regime imposed a new board of directors at FC Barcelona, with Enrique Piñeyro as president and Vidal-Ribas as vice-presidency, whose first task was to adapt the club to the new regime, with measures such as the purge of employees. Two years later, Piñeyro submitted his resignation to the Catalan Football Federation, which was approved on 10 July 1942, being succeeded by Vidal-Ribas, who took charge of an interim committee that ran the club for just a little over a month, until 13 August, when Piñeyro was forced to return after being ratified in office by the Spanish Federation, which did not approve his resignation.

On 5 October 1953, following the resignation of Enric Martí Carreto due to the controversial di Stéfano case, the Catalan Federation appointed a management committee, made up of the ten living former presidents of the club, including Vidal-Ribas, who led the club for two months, until December, during which time he signed the act of resignation of the rights that Barça had over Argentine Alfredo Di Stéfano, who ended up joining rivals Real Madrid.

== Death ==
Vidal-Ribas died in Barcelona on 21 June 1959, at the age of 71.
