= José Vidal Ribas =

José Vidal Ribas or José Vidal-Ribas or José Vidal y Ribas may refer to any of the following people:

- José Vidal Ribas (businessman) (1814–1870), Spanish businessman and slave owner
- José Vidal-Ribas (politician) (1848–1892), Spanish businessman, councillor of Barcelona, and son of the above
- José Vidal-Ribas (1888–1892), Spanish businessman, sports manager, and nephew of the above
