= Agustí Montal Galobart =

Spanish president of the FC Barcelona (1906–1964)

Agustí Montal
- Born: 1906; Barcelona, Spain
- Died: 1964 (aged 57–58)
- Years active: 1946–1952
- Successor: Enric Martí Carreto
- Children: Agustí Montal i Costa

Agustí Montal i Galobart was the president of the FC Barcelona for the years 1946 to 1952. He was born in Barcelona in 1906 and died in 1964.

After the Spanish Civil War and during the early years of the Dictatorship by Francisco Franco, between 1939 and 1953, the president was appointed by the authorities of the regime. Montal's presidency began on 20 September 1946. But success came only in 1952, when the team under the command of Ferdinand Daucik during a season won five titles - La Liga, the Spanish Cup, Copa America, the Trofeo Martini Rossi and the Copa Eva Duarte. This resulted in a significant increase in the Barça fans, so he decided to buy land to build a new stadium - the Camp Nou, since Les Corts was too small to accommodate a growing group of followers. On 16 July 1952 Montal resigned as chairman to be replaced by Enric Martí Carreto.

His son Agustí Montal i Costa was also chairman of the 1966 Barcelona 1977. He was the great-grandfather of Mercé Camprudí Montal, the wife of former Siemens Spain manager Agustín Escobar, who died April 10, 2025, in the Hudson River helicopter crash, along his Great-great-grandchildren.

== See also ==
- List of FC Barcelona presidents
