= Agustín Escobar =

Spanish businessman (1975–2025)

- Born: 1975; Puertollano, Castilla–La Mancha, Spain
- Died: 10 April 2025 (aged 49); Jersey City, New Jersey, U.S.
- Education: Comillas Pontifical University
- Occupation: Business executive
- Years active: 1998-2025
- Known for: CEO of Siemens Spain and Siemens Mobility in Southwest Europe
- Spouse: Mercè Camprubi Montal (died 2025, aged 40)
- Children: 3 (all deceased)

Agustín Escobar Cañadas (1975 – 10 April 2025) was a Spanish business executive who served as president and CEO of Siemens Spain and CEO of Siemens Mobility Southwest Europe from December 2022 until his death. Escobar and his wife and children died in the 2025 Hudson River helicopter crash.

== Early life and education ==
Escobar was from Puertollano in the Castilla–La Mancha region of Spain. Escobar earned a degree in industrial engineering from Comillas Pontifical University in Madrid.

== Career ==
Escobar had over 25 years of experience in the energy and transportation sectors. He joined Siemens Spain in 1998, holding various roles focused on energy. From 2014 to 2018, he led Siemens' Energy Management Division and Infrastructure & Cities Sector in Latin America, including a two-year term as CEO of the latter. Between 2010 and 2014, he was corporate director of strategy and international business development for Siemens in North America. In December 2022, he became president and CEO of Siemens Spain and CEO of Siemens Mobility Southwest Europe.

== Death ==
On 10 April 2025, Escobar, his wife Mercè Camprubi Montal (granddaughter of Agustí Montal Costa and great-granddaughter of Agustí Montal Galobart) and their three children (aged four, eight and ten) were killed in a helicopter crash in the Hudson River near New York City, along with the pilot Seankese Johnson. The Bell 206 aircraft, which departed from Downtown Manhattan Heliport, suffered a mid-air structural failure and crashed after losing radar contact at 3:25 p.m. local time. Escobar was 49 at the time of his death.

== See also ==
- Richard Cousins, former CEO of the Compass Group who perished along with his children in the Sydney Seaplanes DHC-2 crash in Sydney, Australia, in December 2017.
