= Enrique Piñeyro =

Enrique Piñeyro may refer to:

- Enrique Piñeyro Queralt (1883–1960), FC Barcelona club president
- Enrique Piñeyro (actor) (born 1956), Argentine-Italian film actor, director, producer and screenwriter
