= Joan Soler (sports manager) =

Spanish doctor and sports leader (1883–1944)

Vice-president of FC Barcelona
- In office July 1934 – August 1936

24th President of FC Barcelona
- In office 6 May 1939 – 13 March 1940
- Preceded by: Francesc Xavier Casals
- Succeeded by: Enrique Piñeyro Queralt

Personal details
- Born: Joan Soler i Julià; 1 March 1883 Barcelona, Spain
- Died: 27 May 1944 (aged 61) Barcelona, Spain

Joan Soler Julià (1 March 1883 – 27 May 1944) was a Spanish doctor and sports leader who served as the director of the Hospital de la Santa Creu i Sant Pau in Barcelona, as well as the 24th president of FC Barcelona in 1939 and 1940.

== Early life and education ==
Joan Soler was born in the Barcelona square of Plaça de Santa Anna on 1 March 1883, as the son of doctor Joan Soler i Buscalla (1835–1895), native of Olvan, and Dolors Juliá and Inès, native of Barcelona. He studied at both the Institut de Barcelona and the Faculty of Medicine, from which he graduated in 1897 and 1905, respectively. During his studies, he served not only as an intern student in the chair of surgical pathology, but also as an intern physician in the Àlvar Esquerdo Surgery Service at the Hospital de la Santa Creu, where he worked alongside Adolf Pujol Brull from 1906 onwards.

In 1906, Soler concluded his doctorate in Madrid with the thesis Contribución al estudio terapéutico del ácido fórmico y los formiatos.

== Medical career ==
Two years later, in 1908, Soler won a competitive examination that earned him the position of doctor on duty at the Hospital Clínic, where he taught practical classes in surgical pathology from 1911 to 1917.

He then served as a director of the Surgery Service of an Institute for Working Elderly Women, a position that he held until 1931, when he won a competitive examination that earned him the direction of one of the three surgery services of the Hospital de Sant Pau, replacing José Tarruella. Since this service also deals with gynecology, Soler was soon elected president of the Catalan Society of Obstetrics and Gynecology, a subsidiary of the Academia de Ciencias Médicas de Cataluña y Baleares, to which he had been linked since he was a student, and which he had presided during the latter stages of the Civil War, from 1938 to 1939. In 1941, he created an Anesthesiology Service at the Hospital de Sant Pau, which was the first in not only Catalonia, but also in Spain, which soon acquired great prestige for being the centre where the first Catalan and Spanish anesthesiologists were trained. In addition to being a doctor at Sant Pau, he was also president of the society of surgery of the academy of medical sciences.

== Writing and lecturing career ==
In addition to his medical career, Soler wrote several articles that he published in the leading journals of the time, such as the Annals de Medicina i Cirugía, Ars Mèdica, and Anales del Hospital de la Santa Cruz y Sant Pablo, and even before 1911, he served as the editorial secretary of the Revista de Ciencias Médicas de Barcelona, the most prestigious medical publication of those times.

Soler was also an avid lecturer; for instance, between 1917 and 1936, he participated as such in several Congresses of Doctors and Biologists in Catalonia, although he did not present any papers at the latter. Once the Spanish Civil War ended, he resumed this activity, doing so at different venues, such as the Brotherhood of Saints Cosme and Damià, where he dealt with several topics, such as diseases of the genital apparatus and artificial sterility in women. In 1942, Soler organized the Spanish Medical Conferences at Casal del Metge.

== Sporting career ==
In the 1920s, Soler was the medical director of the Royal Aero Club of Catalonia and was also a surgeon to several renowned athletes. In July 1934, he became the vice-president of FC Barcelona, a position that he held until the outbreak of the Civil War in August 1936. Once the conflict was over, Soler agreed to preside over the Barça Management Committee, a position that he held for less than a year, from 6 May 1939 until 13 March 1940, when he was replaced by Enrique Piñeyro Queralt. During this period, he undertook the difficult task of relaunching the club, which had been torn by the War, doing so while under the intense scrutiny of the three Falangist directors appointed to the Management Committee by the regime, who exercised so much control and surveillance over all of Barça's activities that the authorities even opened a specific file dedicated to the club. Despite this, Soler, with the help of former Barça directors, such as Jaume Guardiola and Joan Bargunyó, attempted to push through a management plan aimed at reopening the Les Corts stadium, rebuilding the squad, and recovering the lost membership.

== Death ==
In 1943, Soler was elected a full member of the Royal Academy of Medicine of Barcelona, but he was unable to read the speech that he had prepared because an illness prevented him from attending the induction ceremony. Married to Dolors Creus i Vidal, he died a few months later, on 27 May 1944.
