= Tudo =

Tudo or Tudó may refer to:

== Arts and entertainment ==
- Tudo, 11-CD box set by Marcos Valle
- Tudo, album by Joyce (singer)
- "Tudo", song by Bebel Gilberto
- Tudo (film), see List of Romanian films of 2016

== People ==
- Pepita Tudó (1779–1869), the second wife of Spanish Prime Minister Manuel de Godoy
- Luis Tudó (1894–1975), Spanish footballer
