= Puertollano =

- Municipality
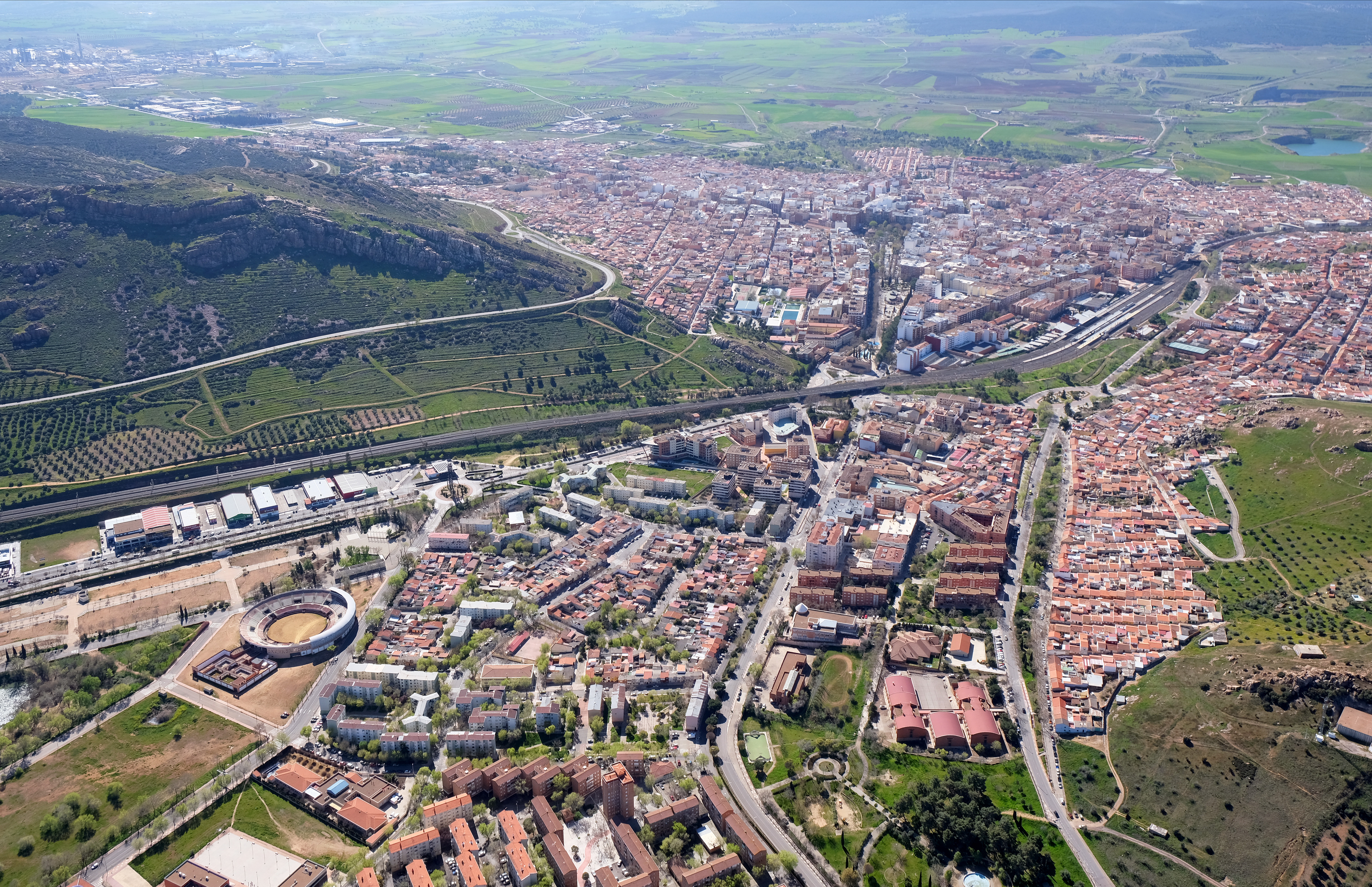
- Aerial view (March 2021)

- Coat of arms

- Location in Spain. Puertollano (Castilla-La Mancha)
- Coordinates: 38°41′N 4°7′W
- Country: Spain
- Autonomous Community: Castilla–La Mancha
- Province: Ciudad Real

Government
  - Mayor: Adolfo Muniz

Area
  - Total: 226.74 km^{2} (87.54 sq mi)
- Elevation: 708 m (2,323 ft)

Population (2022)
  - Total: 45,539
  - Density: 200.84/km^{2} (520.18/sq mi)
- Time zone: UTC+1 (CET)
  - Summer (DST): UTC+2 (CEST)
- Postcode: 13500
- Website: Official website

Puertollano (Spanish pronunciation: [pweɾtoˈʎano]) is a municipality of Spain located in the province of Ciudad Real, Castile-La Mancha. The city has a population of 45,539 (2022). Contrasting to the largely rural character of the region, Puertollano stands out for the importance of industry, with a past linked to industrial and mining activities. It lies on the Madrid–Seville high-speed rail line (opened 1992).

== Geography ==
=== Location ===
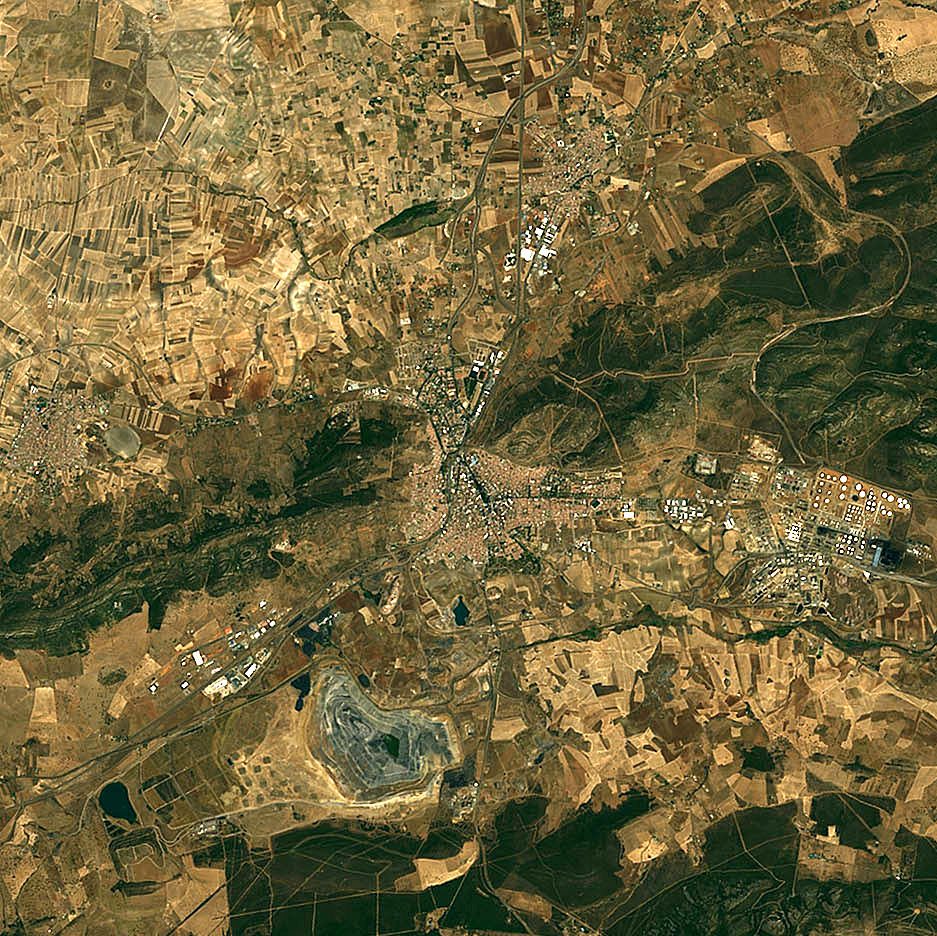
Satellite view centered on Puertollano.

Puertollano is located in the Iberian Peninsula, in the transitional region between the southern half of the Inner Plateau and the northern reaches of Sierra Morena.

It lies at the natural pass linking the plains of Argamasilla to the North and the valley of the Ojailén river to the south, on which a modest East–West chain of mountains interrupts, at about 710 metres above sea level.

The Ojailén, a tributary of the Jándula (in turn a right-bank tributary of the Guadalquivir), originally belonged to the Guadiana basin, yet it was later captured by the Guadalquivir basin.

It is sided by the Cerro de Santa Ana (900 m) and the Cerro de San Sebastián (880 m), hills located, respectively, to the North-East and West of the urban nucleus.

It is located in the southern limits of the Campo de Calatrava volcanic region, featuring the famous Fuente Agria, an instance of the many ferruginous water springs with high CO_{2} content common in the volcanic area.

== History ==
Archaeological investigations have shown that the area was inhabited in prehistoric times (Homo heidelbergensis and Homo antecessor). Bronze Age weapons have been found and also a Visigoth necropolis from the post-Roman period.

Later the region formed part of the depopulated no-mans land between Christian (Northern) Spain and the Moorish Caliphate to the south.

Upon the Christian victory at the Battle of Las Navas de Tolosa (1212), the new Christian authorities encouraged settlers from northern Iberia to install in the conquered territories. Puertollano (then Puertoplano) was founded as a hamlet shortly after. In 1348 however, the Black Death devastated the village, killing all but 13 families.

Philip II granted Puertollano the title of town (villa) in 1576 as well as the arms of the House of Austria.

It continued to grow slowly as a small town specializing in textiles and ceramics.

As coal was discovered in 1873, the village became a mining town from then on, leading to a sudden growth in the population. The apex of the economic importance of coal mining took place during World War I as the imports of British coal were not available, and the local economy based on the extraction of bituminous coal thrived in the national market. In 1920 the population had reached 20,083.

Puertollano was granted the title of the city (Ciudad) via Royal Decree in June 1925, during the dictatorship of Primo de Rivera. Following the end of the Spanish Civil War and up until the 1973 oil crisis the economic activity of Puertollano readjusted towards the extraction of oil shale.

== Economy ==
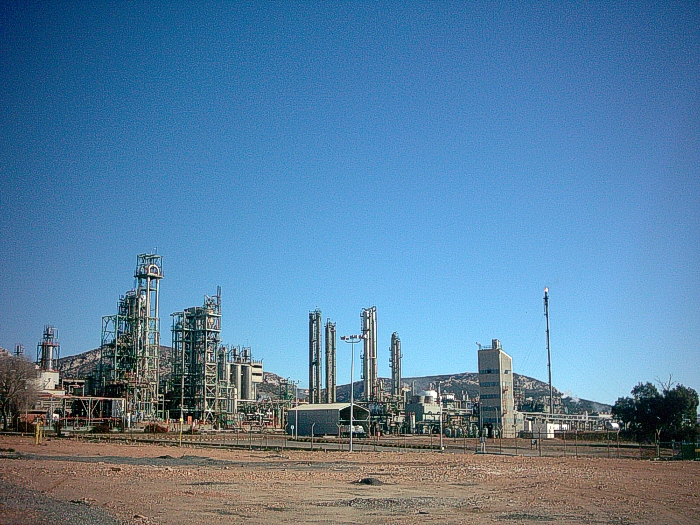
The Puertollano oil refinery.

Puertollano is the largest industrial center in the Castilla-La Mancha region. It was formerly a coal mining town but today only one open-cast mine remains.

Nowadays the main industries are petrochemicals (Repsol), fertilisers (Fertiberia), power generation and, most recently, the manufacture of solar panels. The city has received national and EU aid to diversify its economy after the decline of the coal industry.

== Points of interest ==
The Dehesa Boyal de Puertollano botanical gardens is located in the city.

== Notable people ==
- David Almansa, Moto3 Racer
- Santiago Cañizares, former footballer
- María Dueñas, author
- Agustín Escobar, business executive
- Cristina García Rodero, photographer
