= Rafael Llopart =

Spanish industrialist and sports leader

- Born: Rafael Llopart Vidaud; 7 October 1875; Guantánamo, Cuba
- Died: 23 June 1951 (aged 75); Barcelona, Catalonia, Spain
- Occupations: Industrialist; Sports leader
- Known for: President of FC Barcelona

13th President of FC Barcelona
- In office 29 June 1915 – 25 June 1916
- Preceded by: Joaquim Peris de Vargas
- Succeeded by: Gaspar Rosés

President of Club Deportiu Sitgetà

Rafael Llopart Vidaud (7 October 1875 – 23 June 1951) was a Spanish industrialist and sports leader of Cuban origin. He was the 13th president of football club FC Barcelona between 1915 and 1916.

== Early and personal life ==
Rafael Llopart was born on 7 October 1875 in Cuba, which at the time was a colony of Spain, as the son of Rafael Llopart Ferret, an Indian from Sitges who later returned to Catalonia to invest his fortune in the textile industry.

Llopart married Ana de Arnal Amell, and the couple had three children, Rafaél, Matilde, and Juan Llopart Arnal.

== Sporting career ==
Llopart joined the board of directors of FC Barcelona during the second presidential term of Joan Gamper, serving as treasurer between 1911 and 1913. A trusted man of the club's founder, he was elected as the 13th President of FC Barcelona at the assembly held on 29 June 1915, after the controversial presidency of Joaquín Peris de Vargas that even caused a strong internal division between those who supported him and those who did not. His appointment marked the beginning of a period of peace and consensus at the heart of the club and the new Board saw that it was necessary to renovate everything, which they did with efficiency and without any upset.

The calm that reigned among the management not only filtered down to the supporters, but also to the team, who won the 1915–16 Catalan Championship with authority, winning all eleven games played. During the 1916 Copa del Rey, FC Barcelona faced Madrid CF in the semifinals for their first-ever El Clásico in the competition's history, but the clash was involved in enormous controversy due to the biased decisions of the referee José Berraondo, a former Madrid player, which prompted the Barça players to walk off the pitch. After this result, Llopart and his Board resigned on 25 June 1916, although the members unsuccessfully asked them to stay on; he was replaced by Gaspar Rosés. Llopart's most prominent action and enduring legacy as the presidency of Barça was the creation of the first section of the entity, athletics.

Outside of FC Barcelona, Llopart was president of the defunct Club Deportiu Sitgetà, and later he was honorary president of its heir, UE Sitges. He was also a member of the Vedado Rally Prat, which organized the first pigeon shooting competition, and where in May 1912, he won a poule shooting competition. In the late 1920s, Llopart donated a magnificent cup to the winners of a tournament between Spartacus, Rapits, Nuria, Cornella, Aguilas, Catalonia Barcino, and Stadium. All the matches were held in Sitges, and it was comfortably won by the local team, which guaranteed the great trophy without losing a single match.

== Professional career ==
From the existing documentation, it seems that Llopart continued his father's textile business. In 1924, together with Joan Martí and Joan Trenchs as partners, he established the company Textil Martí, Llopart y Trenchs SA, with factories in Roselló and Pla de Santa María. The factory in Pla was founded in 1916 and officially inaugurated on 26 March 1917, providing work for many people from the town and the surrounding area. In the 1960s it went from bad to worse and was acquired by Hilaturas Gossypium.

A fan of floriculture, Llopart owned large greenhouses in Sitges and was the official flower supplier to Queen Victoria Eugenie of Battenberg. In 1919, he created the Floreal, an extensive flower plant on the outskirts of the town, which by 1924 occupied 0.8 hectares of land. He was also a promoter of the National Carnation Exhibition and the Sitges Corpus Christi flower carpet competition.

== Death ==
Llopart died in Barcelona on 23 June 1951, at the age of 75.
