= Supporters of FC Barcelona =

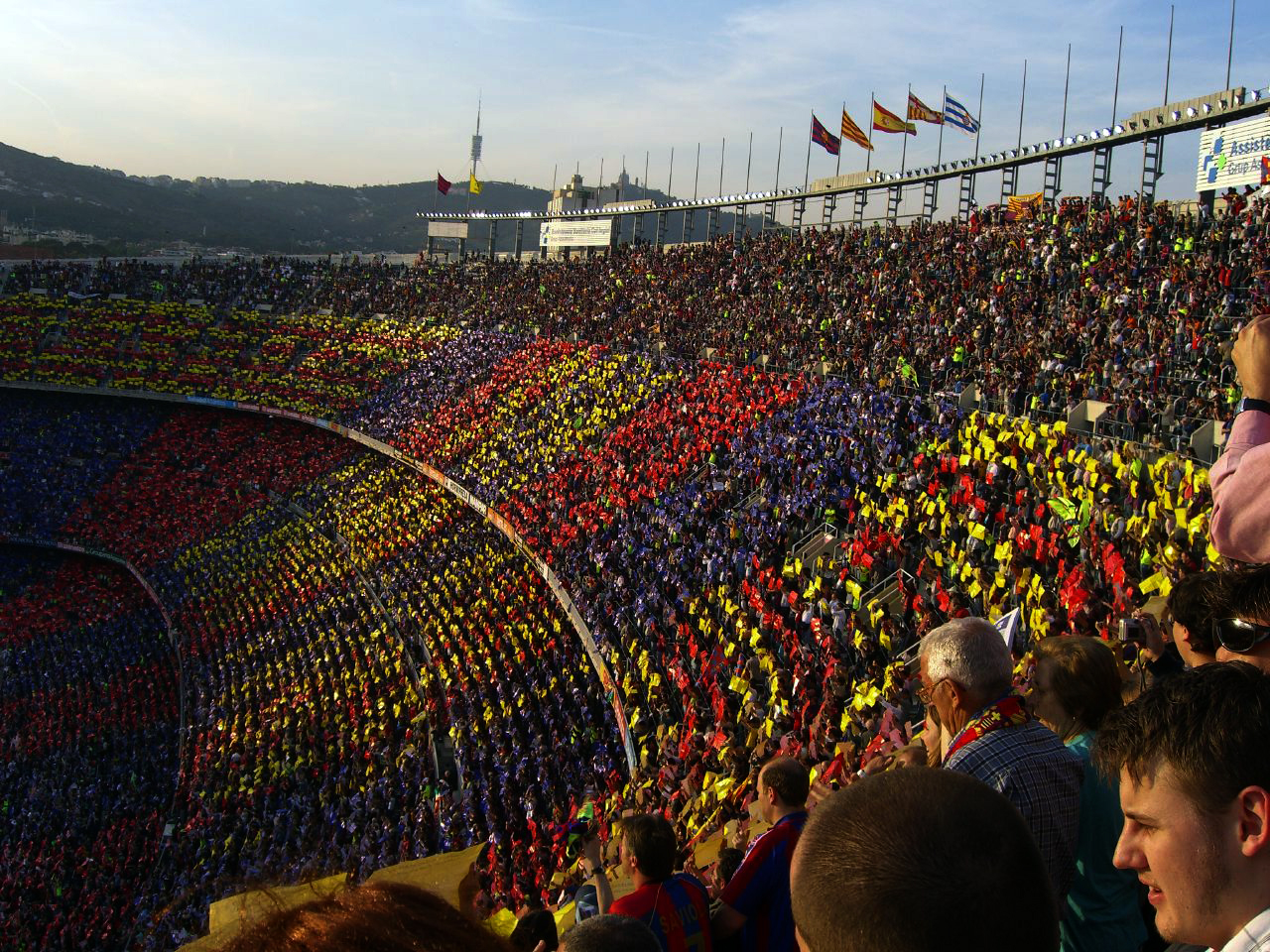
Barcelona supporters during a match at Camp Nou.

FC Barcelona is a professional multi-sports club based in Barcelona, formed in 1899 by a group of Swiss, Catalan, German and English footballers led by Joan Gamper. It has been part of the Spanish top-flight, La Liga, since the league's inception in 1928, winning it 29 times, along with a record 32 Copa del Rey and five UEFA Champions League victories.

The arrival of Ronaldinho in 2003, and Barcelona's subsequent success in La Liga and Champions League, has been seen as crucial to an increase in the national, and worldwide, fan-base of the club. This development of a larger national fan-base has created friction between the Catalan nationalist supporters, who wish to secede from Spain, and the club's other Spanish supporters.

There are three types of supporters of Barcelona; one is the soci or club-member, who is eligible to vote in the presidential election of the club and other matters. The penyes, who are closely affiliated with the socis, are fan-clubs, which in the past have been responsible for large donations to the club. Lastly, there are the ordinary fans of the club, the culers, who do not possess any formal membership.

== Culers ==
The nickname culer for a Barcelona supporter is derived from the Catalan cul ('arse'). Before 1909, Barcelona played in various stadiums, none of which were owned by the club. On 14 March 1909, the club moved to the Camp de la Indústria which had a capacity of 6,000 people, and it was the first ground owned by the club. Barcelona moved to Les Corts in 1922, which had an initial capacity of 20,000, which was later enlarged 3-fold to 60,000. The top-row of Les Corts was the origin of the nickname culer, derived from the Catalan cul (English: arse), as the spectators at the first stadium, Camp de la Indústria, sat with their culs over the stand. The English author, Phil Ball, notes that "all you could see was row upon row of bums".

== Socis ==
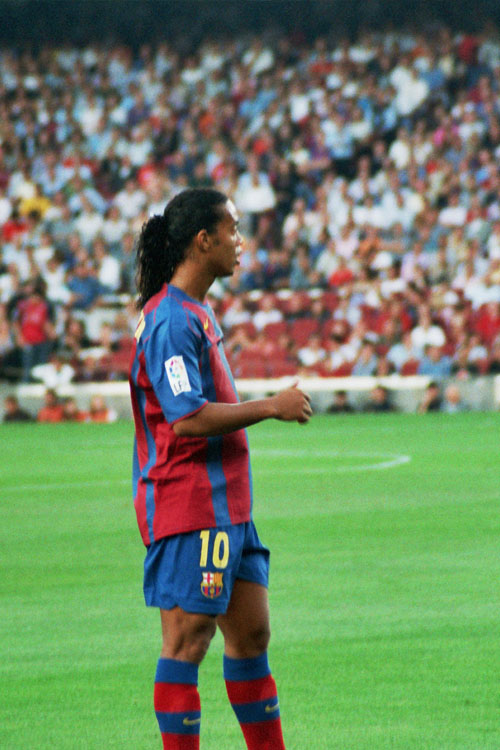
Ronaldinho has been credited for the global rise in supporters during his time at the club.

In 1975, the death of Franco marked the beginning of Spain's transition into a democracy and three years later, Josep Lluís Núñez became the first elected president of FC Barcelona. Since then, the members of Barcelona, called socis, have elected a club president.

The club's membership figures have seen a significant increase from 100,000 in the 2003–04 season to 170,000 in September 2009, the sharp rise being attributed to the influence of Ronaldinho and then-president Joan Laporta's media strategy that focused on Spanish and English online media. In the presidential election of 2010, the rise in club-members during the previous seven years caused the campaign to focus on whether to allow votes from non-Catalan members, through internet or post. The balloting committee decided to only allow votes from members who registered at the home stadium on the day of the election. As of 31 May 2023, the club has 150,317 memberships, called socis.

Socis have existed since the early days of the club, with statutes in 1902 and 1911 saying that only men could be full members. The club still had female fans, among them Edelmira Calvetó, who wanted to become a soci; having been turned down several times, she persisted, being granted membership number 86 on 1 January 1913. By the time of the next statutes in 1921, socis were described in gender neutral terms. Barcelona was the first Spanish club to admit female members.

== Penyes ==
In the mid-1940s, the club invented the notion of penyes, a mix between a fan club and a financial support club, during a time when the club was in need of financial and public support due to the hostility of General Francisco Franco's dictatorship. The first Penya Solera, was formed in 1944 by a group of supporters and former players of the team. The penyes would later exhibit their financial prowess in 1953, when they proposed the building of the Camp Nou. Inspiration was drawn from the financial plan Athletic Bilbao, a rival team, used to build San Mamés stadium, where an association of penyes pledged to finance the construction. As a result, the subsequent construction of the stadium put the club into its supporters' hands, giving the penyes political influence over the club, which still lasts today.

In the early 1980s, one of the most notorious penyes, the Boixos Nois (English: Crazy Boys) was founded. The peña who identified with left-wing independentism, repeatedly demanded the resignation of president Núñez, openly defying his presidency through chants and banners at matches. At the same time, the city of Barcelona experienced a rise in the number of skinheads, who identified with right-wing separatism. The skinheads slowly moved the Boixos Nois' political ideology from liberalism to fascism, which caused fractions within the group. Inspired by British hooligans, the remaining Boixos Nois became violent, which often lead to mass-scale arrests.

According to the protest organisation L'Elephant Blau (English: The Blue Elephant), formed in part by later-president Joan Laporta in 1998, the former president Núñez promoted the emergence of skinheads among the Boixos and gave them permission to roam freely around the stadium, using them for his own political gain. When Núñez resigned in 2000, his vice-president Joan Gaspart took over as president. Gaspart publicly expressed his sympathies for Boixos Nois, claiming that he would join the group as soon as he resigned as chairman. The comment caused the Boixos Nois members to occasionally be referred to as 'the chairman's boys'.

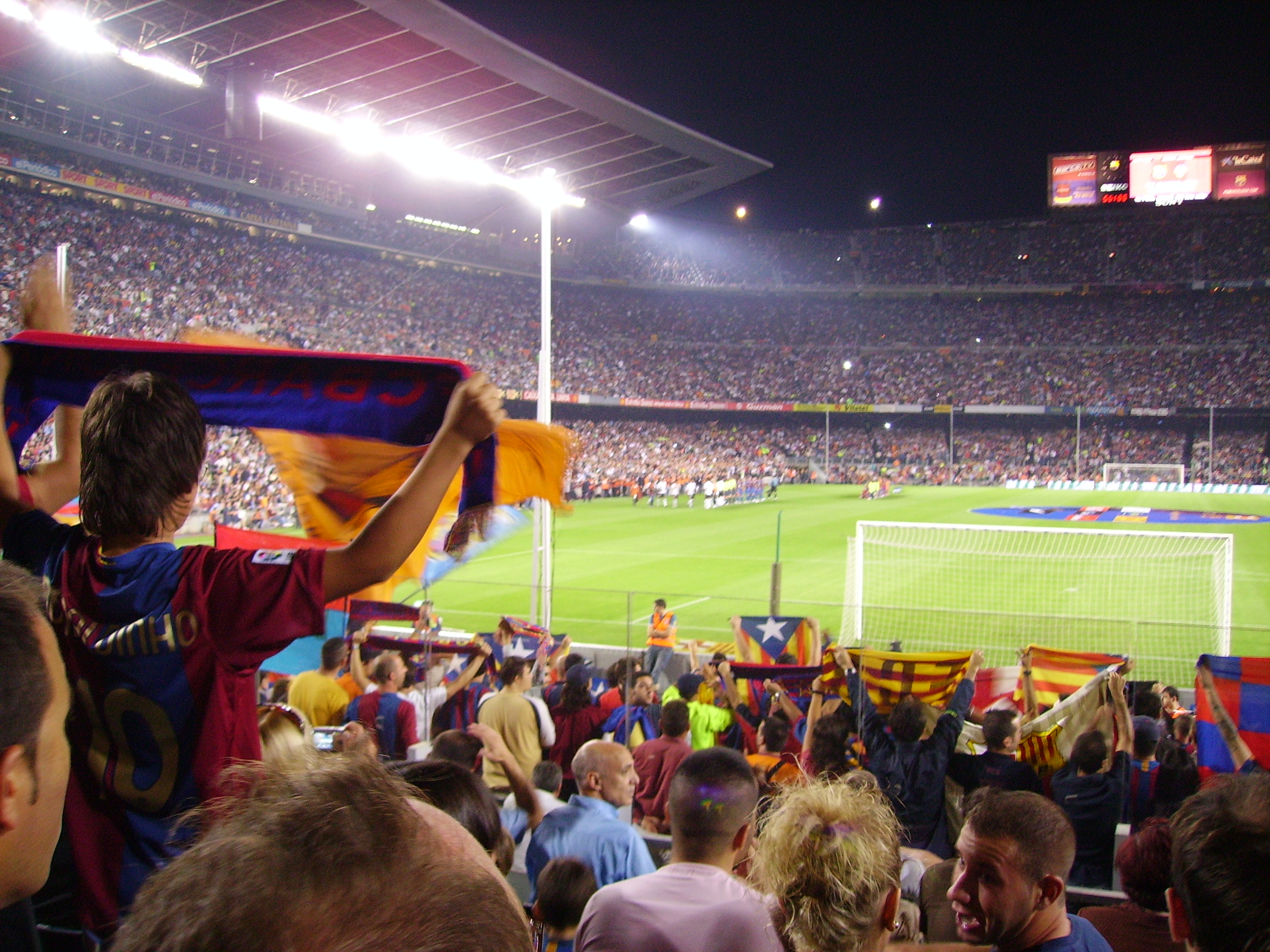
Barcelona supporters

The same year saw the controversial transfer of the Barcelona vice-captain Luís Figo to arch-rivals Real Madrid. When Figo returned to the Camp Nou with his new club in November 2002, the Boixos responded to Figo's perceived treachery by whistling and jeering whenever he went near the ball. The abuse peaked when the Boixos threw a severed pig's head at him, while he was taking a corner. The match has since been known in Spain as the "Partido de la Vergüenza" (English: The Game of Shame). It was suspended for 13 minutes by the referee, who took the players off the pitch because of fears for their safety. It ended in a 0–0 draw.

As of 2022 there are 1,264 officially registered fan clubs, called penyes, around the world. The fan clubs promote Barcelona in their locality and receive beneficial offers when visiting Barcelona.

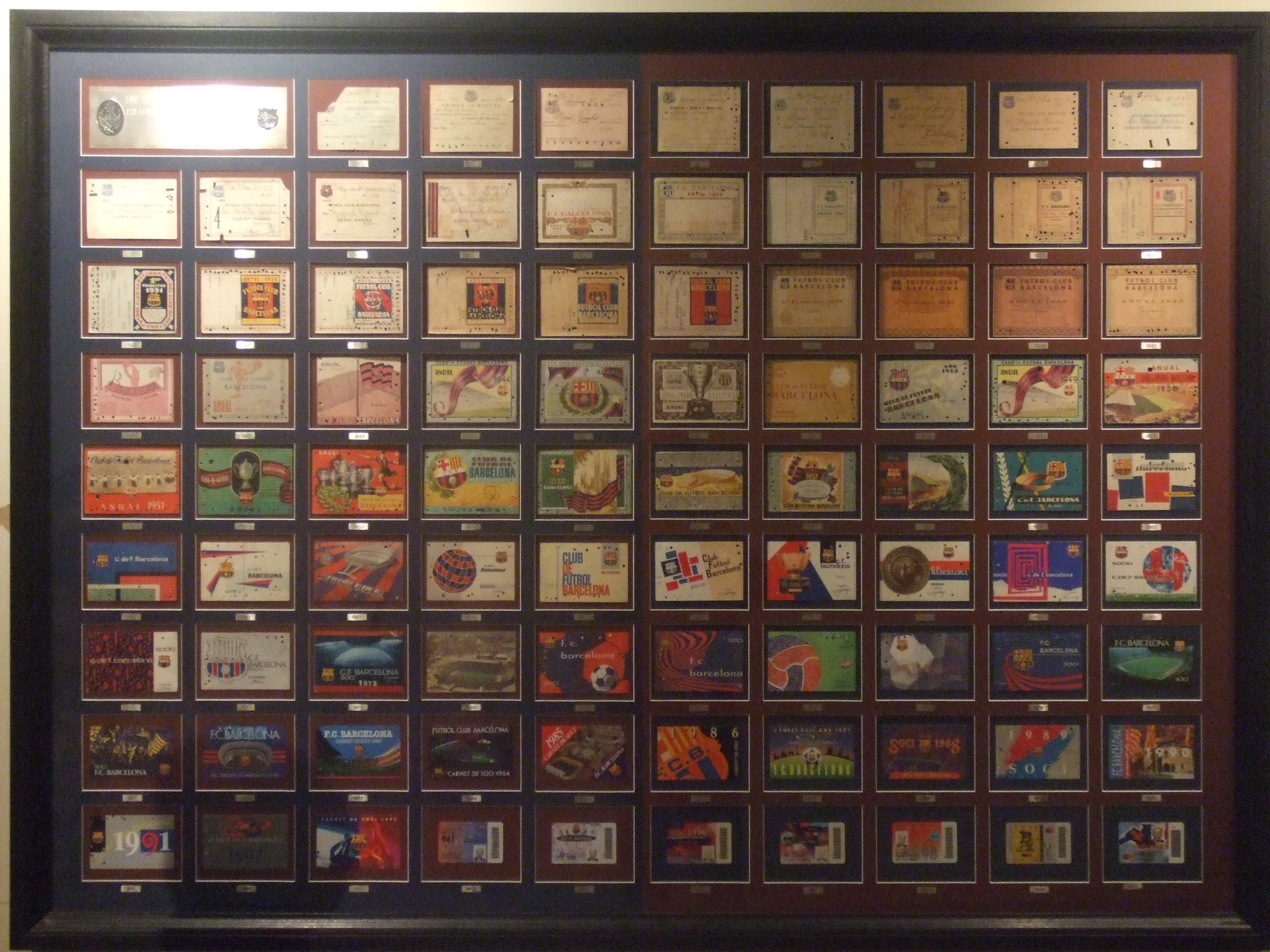
FC Barcelona membership cards (1899–2000)

== Fan base ==
In a 2007 study in Spain, about 25% of the population was said to be Barça sympathisers, second behind Real Madrid, supported by 32% of the population. Throughout Europe, in 2007 Barcelona was the favourite second-choice club. Among the best supported teams globally, Barcelona has the second highest social media following in the world among sports teams, with over 103 million Facebook fans as of December 2021, only behind Real Madrid with 111 million.

During the 1940s and 50s, Franco's oppression of Catalonia caused the relationship between the club and its supporters to change. For the supporters, FC Barcelona became synonymous with Catalonia, a feeling incorporated in the club's Més que un club motto (English: More than a club). The socio-political impulse Visca el Barça (Long live Barça), gradually evolved into Visca el Barça i visca Catalunya (Long live Barça and Catalonia) and was the same as a protest-song against the fascist government in Madrid. Outside Catalonia, FC Barcelona has also been seen as being Més que un club (Más que un club) for many liberal-minded Spaniards. It was the left-wing intellectuals that become Barça supporters in recognition of its role in defending democratic rights and freedom.

During the first decade of the new millennium, president Joan Laporta, a supporter of Catalan nationalism, repeatedly expressed his support of Catalonia's secession from Spain and characterised the club as the symbol for Catalan separatism. The politicization of the club drew criticism from several club members who accused Laporta of alienating Barcelona fans, both within and outside of Catalunya. By 2003 Barcelona had 1,200 penyes around the world, causing other Spanish clubs to copy the concept. With each individual peña (Castilian Spanish spelling) having different names and rules, it has become a custom in Spain to name a new peña after their favourite player or match, and in turn the player usually attends to the inaugural supper.

The club has had many prominent people among its supporters, including Pope John Paul II, who was an honorary member, and former prime minister of Spain José Luis Rodríguez Zapatero.

== Bibliography ==
- Ball, Phill (2003). Morbo: The Story of Spanish Football. WSC Books Limited. ISBN 978-0-9540134-6-2.
- Chadwick, Simon; Arthur, Dave (2007). International cases in the business of sport. Butterworth-Heinemann. ISBN 978-0-7506-8543-6.
- Fisk, Peter (2008). Business Genius: A More Inspired Approach to Business Growth. John Wiley and Sons. ISBN 978-1-84112-790-3.
- Spaaij, Ramón (2006). Understanding football hooliganism: a comparison of six Western European football clubs. Amsterdam University Press. ISBN 978-90-5629-445-8.
