= Joaquim Peris de Vargas =

Spanish sports leader (1880–1959)

Joaquim Peris

Vice-president of FC Barcelona
- In office 1910–1914

12th President of FC Barcelona
- In office 29 September 1914 – 29 June 1915
- Preceded by: Àlvar Presta
- Succeeded by: Rafael Llopart

President of the Catalan Football Federation
- In office 1915–1916
- Preceded by: Ricardo Cabot
- Succeeded by: Gaspar Rosés

President of Sant Andreu
- In office 1915–1915

Personal details
- Born: Joaquim Peris de Vargas; 1880 Barcelona, Catalonia, Spain
- Died: 7 February 1959 (aged 78–79) Barcelona, Catalonia, Spain

Joaquim Peris de Vargas (1880 – 7 February 1959) was a Spanish sports leader who served as the 12th president of FC Barcelona in 1914 and 1915, as well as the president of Sant Andreu and the Catalan Football Federation in 1915.

== Early life ==
Peris was born in 1880 in Cuba, to a Valencian father, Joaquín Peris Serrano, a military man, and an Asturian mother. He was the first son of seven children, including three brothers, Agustin, Lisandro, and Enrique, who were also outstanding sportsmen and leaders.

Peris was a military man with the rank of Infantry Colonel.

== Sporting career ==
Having started his sporting career as a player for Internacional and Català, Peris then became a director at Barcelona, where he soon rose to the vice presidency, a position he held for four years, until 1914. Following Joan Gamper's second resignation in June 1913, Peris vied for the presidency, but finished the election in third place with 59 votes, far behind Gaspar Rosés (172) and Francesc de Moxó (183). During this period, Peris became the leader of a faction within the club that supported his authoritarian leadership style, which soon clashed with those who wanted a true democracy at FC Barcelona, causing an internal conflict that Moxó was unable to resolve. Following Moxó's resignation in June 1914, several members of the club supported the vice-president Peris' vie for the presidency, but the board chose instead to give it to Àlvar Presta, who resigned just three months later, precisely because of the discontent between the board and members.

Peris' time in charge of Barça was marked by several controversies, mainly because of his dictatorial style, which led some of his players to rise against him, and once even went as far as to claim that: "I am Barcelona". He only left the club at the request of the Captain General of Catalonia, Felipe Alfau Mendoza, who forced to resign at the end of the 1914–15 season.

Also in 1915, Peris took over the presidency of both Sant Andreu and the Catalan Football Federation. He was also vice secretary of the Lawn Tennis Association, the forerunner of the Catalan Tennis Federation.

== Bibliography ==
- Porta, Frederic; Tomás, Manuel (2016-03-10). Barça inédito: 800 historias de la Historia [Unpublished Barça: 800 stories from history] (in Spanish). CÓRNER. p. 88. ISBN 978-84-944256-6-0.
