= Otto Gmeling =

German football executive (1876–1925)

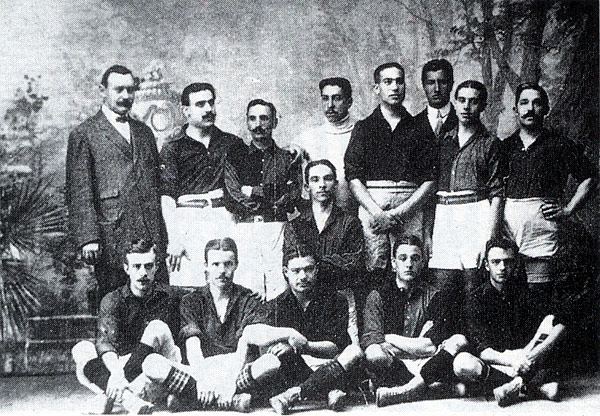
- Gmelin (standing, third from the right) in 1910

9th President of FC Barcelona
- In office 14 October 1909 – 17 November 1910
- Preceded by: Joan Gamper
- Succeeded by: Joan Gamper

Personal details
- Born: July 5, 1876 Wangen im Allgäu, Germany
- Died: 29 October 1925 (aged 48–49) Esslingen am Neckar, Germany

Otto Gmeling or Gmelin, also known as Grand Otto (5 July 1876 – 29 October 1925), was a German and the president of FC Barcelona from 1909–1910.

He was the Club's President when they won their first domestic title, the Copa del Rey in 1910. They also won the Catalan championship undefeated and their first Pyrenees Cup.

Under Gmelings presidency, the club gained a gradual increase in the number of spectators who came to watch the games, which marked the transition from amateur to professional football.

== See also ==
- List of FC Barcelona presidents
