= Tomàs Rosés =

Tomàs Rosés was a banker and president of FC Barcelona from 1929 to 1930. A banker by trade, Rosés became the 17th president of FC Barcelona on 23 March 1929, and presided over the club as they won a Catalan Championship and the inaugural edition of La Liga, as the team won the 1929 La Liga.

However, despite the team success, the players refused to play until future president Josep Sunyol was able to defuse the situation. On 30 June 1930 he resigned as president, leaving the club in the hands of Gaspar Rosés who became president for the third time.
