= Alfonso Macaya =

Spanish football executive

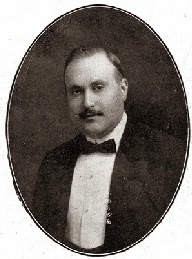

1st Honorary President of Hispania AC
- In office 1900–1903

7th President of Real Club de Tenis Barcelona
- In office 1929–1935
- Preceded by: José Vidal-Ribas
- Succeeded by: Carlos Godó Valls
- Born: Alfons Macaya i Sanmartí; 1878; Barcelona, Catalonia, Spain
- Died: 1950 (aged 71-72); Barcelona, Catalonia, Spain
- Citizenship: Spanish
- Occupations: Football executive; Businessman
- Known for: Founder of Copa Macaya

Alfonso Macaya Sanmartí (1878–1950) was a Spanish football executive and businessman. He is widely regarded as one of the most important figures in the amateur beginnings of football in Catalonia since he was the fundamental head behind the foundation of Hispania AC in 1900, and then serving the club as its honorary president, a position from which he played a pivotal role in the promotion and creation of the Copa Macaya, the first football championship played on the Iberian Peninsula, and the forerunner for the Catalan championship which began in 1903. He also chaired the Catalan Tennis Federation (1906–09) and even held the presidency of the Real Club de Tenis Barcelona from 1929 to 1935.

== Sporting career ==
=== Hispania AC ===
In October 1900, the 22-year-old Alfonso Macaya, a man from the Catalan high bourgeoisie and passionate about emerging sports practices, such as fencing or tennis and football, played a fundamental role in the foundation of Hispània Athletic Club, which was formed, among others, by a group of football players from Català FC, which included several of Català's founding members. Hispania AC, however, was not just a football club, but a Society that participated in other sports, such as athletics and tennis. Hispania's first president was Josep Ortiz, but the soul of the club was Macaya, who was thus named the honorary president of Hispania, and as soon as he started his term, he began to develop the idea of a football championship between different clubs: The Copa Macaya.

=== Copa Macaya ===
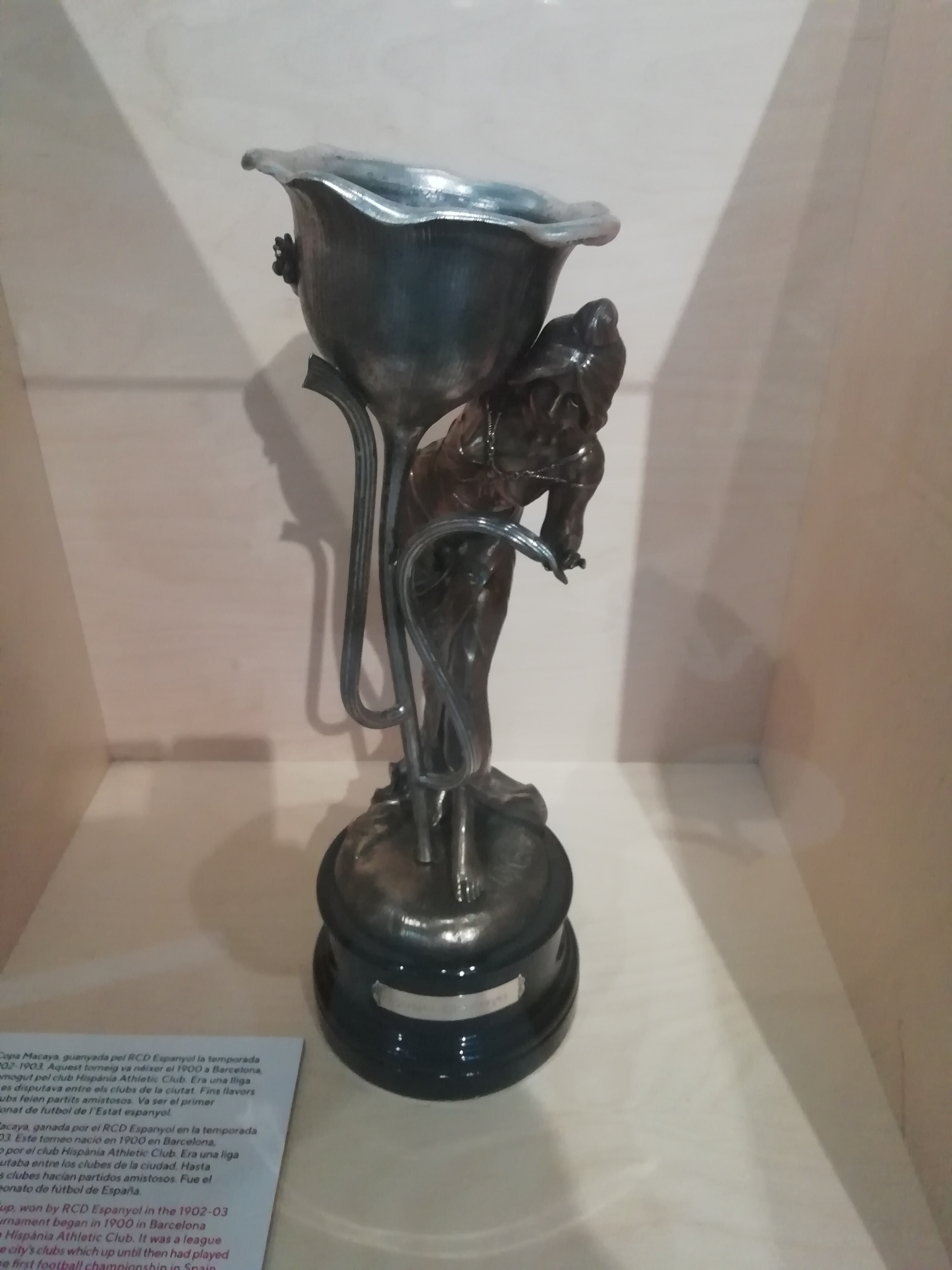
The Copa Macaya trophy.

In December 1900, Macaya began promoting the idea of a football championship contested in a league format between the different clubs that had been created in Spain, with registration being open to all national clubs throughout the country. In the end, however, only six Catalan teams participated, of which only one was a non-Barcelona team, the Tarragona Club, with some of the remaining participants including FC Barcelona and Club Espanyol (currently RCD Espanyol). In addition to the new competitive format, and in order to create greater motivation, Alfonso Macaya himself offers a trophy for the winner of the tournament, a magnificent silver Cup, hence its name (Copa Macaya). Macaya commissioned the Cup from a London master goldsmith, but no one knew anything about it, nor did it appear during the first championship. Only a few days before the final match, the Cup was publicly presented, causing a certain disappointment due to its small size and for not being made of gold, but silver.

Copa Macaya was thus the first football championship played on the Iberian Peninsula, and the forerunner for the Catalan championship which began in 1903. It was under his honorary presidency that Hispania AC organized the first edition of the Copa Macaya, which was held in 1900–01. Hispania were the pre-favorites to win the competition together with Joan Gamper's FC Barcelona, and the title was decided in the final matchday between the two of them, where a 1–1 draw was enough for Hispania to become the first-ever Spanish club to win an official title. This historic meeting did not end without controversy, however, since the referee disallowed a second goal from Barcelona for offside, a decision that was heavily contested, with Barça claiming bias refereeing in favor of the organizers of the tournament. In fact, Club Espanyol withdrew from the tournament after the fourth match, claiming that the refereeing was favoring Macaya's team.

The second edition of the Copa Macaya was held in the following year, and this time it was won by FC Barcelona. By the end of 1902, Hispania was already in decline, but it still has the strength and courage to organize the third edition of its championship. Alfonso Macaya distances himself from the organization of the tournament, which falls to Thomas Shields. Macaya was Hispania's honorary president for as long as the club lasted, holding the position until its disappearance in November 1903, partly motivated by the departure of its most emblematic players, who joined other clubs, mainly FC Barcelona.

In 1927 he founded in Sitges, together with Salvador Casacuberta, the Terramar Golf Club, of which he was its first president, until 1931. Apart from the world of sport, he was a founding partner of the Centro Algodonero Nacional, the first president of the Association of Bibliophiles of Barcelona, founded in 1943, and vice-president of the Associació Amics dels Museus (Friends of the Museums Association). In 1929 he was appointed as the 7th president of Real Club de Tenis Barcelona, a position he held for 6 years until 1935.
