= Enric Martí Carreto =

Catalan textile entrepreneur and president of FC Barcelona

- Years active: 1952-1953
- Successor: Francesc Miró-Sans

Enric Martí Carreto was a Catalan textile entrepreneur in the second half of the 20th century. He became known in Spain for being manager and president of FC Barcelona in the years 1952-1953. In the only season that Enric Martí was in command at Fútbol Club Barcelona, the team won the League, Cup and the Copa Eva Duarte, but that positive dynamic was broken by the controversy of the ‘Di Stefano case’, which led him to resign from the position. His tenure at the Catalan club went down in history as the man who presided over the club during the "Di Stefano-case" He resigned as chairman after agreeing to give Di Stefano to Real Madrid.

== See also ==
- List of FC Barcelona presidents
