= Àlvar Presta =

Spanish doctor and sports executive

- Born: Àlvar Presta i Torns; 18 February 1868; Barcelona, Catalonia, Spain
- Died: 23 December 1933 (aged 65); Barcelona, Catalonia, Spain
- Occupations: Footballer; Football executive
- Known for: President of FC Barcelona

11th President of FC Barcelona
- In office 30 June 1914 – 29 September 1914
- Preceded by: Francesc de Moxò
- Succeeded by: Joaquim Peris de Vargas

1st President of the Catalan Athletics Federation
- In office 2 September 1915 – 14 January 1917
- Succeeded by: Jaime Garcia Alsina

Àlvar Presta i Torns, sometimes mentioned as Álvaro Presta (18 February 1868 – 23 December 1933), was a Spanish doctor and sports executive, who served as the 11th president of the football club FC Barcelona in 1914 as well as the first president of the Catalan Athletics Federation between 1915 and 1917.

The outstanding role he acquired in the Barcelona society of his time due to his prestige as a doctor, led him to preside over some of the most respected institutions in the city from a medical and social point of view, such as the Barcelona Society of Friends of Instruction in 1908, the Academy of Hygiene of Catalonia from 1913 to 1916, Academy of Medical Sciences from 1918 and 1920, and the Doctors' Union of Catalonia in December 1926.

== Early life and education ==
Àlvar Presta was born on 18 February 1868 in Sants, which at the time still was a municipality independent of Barcelona, the city where he obtained his bachelor's degree in 1885. He then entered the Faculty of Medicine of the University of Barcelona, receiving an honorable mention in the Medical Clinic award (which was won by Eduardo Xalabarder), and graduated in 1892.

The young Presta, like so many doctors of his time, was interested in tuberculosis, the most prevalent disease of that time. In 1900, he was the medical director of the first Antituberculosis Dispensary in Barcelona, and in 1904, he was appointed vice-president of the Board of Directors of the Patronat de Catalunya for the Fight against Tuberculosis.

== Sporting career ==
Presta also approached the world of sport and, in 1913, he joined the FC Barcelona board of directors chaired by Francesc de Moxó, whose resignation in 1914 caused a strong internal division. A part of the partners wanted the then vice-president Joaquim Peris de Vargas to assume the direction of the Entity, but others were against it. In the Assembly held on 30 June 1914, he was elected as the 11th President of FC Barcelona. The internal division, however, remained, and after just three months, on 29 September, he resigned due to the unrest between him and Peris de Vargas, his vice-president who aspired to preside over the club. Presta's most prominent action and enduring legacy as the presidency of Barça was the hiring of a doctor for the first time in the history of the club, Felio Castells Farrerons, to take care of the health problems and injuries of the players of the first team of FC Barcelona.

In 1915, Presta was one of the promoters of the creation of the Catalan Athletics Federation, the very first federation of such in Catalonia. He was the editor of its Statutes and the first president of the institution, a position he held for two years, between 1915 and 1917, when he was replaced by Jaime Garcia.

== Professional career ==
In January 1917, Presta was elected a member of the Governing Board of the College of Doctors of Barcelona (COMB) and, in December of the same year, he was appointed director of the Laboratory of Cabinets and Museums of the Scientific Section of the COMB, position that he repeated in 1920 by an election.

The outstanding role that Presta acquired in the Barcelona society of his time due to his prestige as a doctor, led him to preside over some of the most respected institutions in the city from a medical and social point of view, such as the Barcelona Society of Friends of Instruction in 1908, the Academy of Hygiene of Catalonia from 1913 to 1916, and the Doctors' Union of Catalonia in December 1926. In the Academy of Medical Sciences, where he entered in 1895, Presta held the positions of Secretary of Records and Correspondence from 1898 to 1900, curator of Museums from 1902 to 1904, and general secretary from 1905 to 1907 until he elected president for the 1918–1920 biennium. His concern for hygiene drove him to participate in activities related to prevention and he was part of different Commissions, such as the Barcelona Water Commission or the Technical Subcommission of the Barcelona Health Commission in 1915, which issues an opinion on the city's fountains.

Presta became an academic of the Royal Academy of Medicine and Surgery of Barcelona in 1902 in recognition of the two works that he presented on the Treatment of Strep and Staphylococcal Infections by Brewer's Yeast and A Case of Aortic Aneurysm Treated with Serum Injections Gelatinized, and it was under this umbrella that he participated in the first Congress of Catalan Language Doctors and was elected as a vice-president of the organizing Board of the second Congress of Doctors. In 1919, he participated in the third Congress of Doctors with a study on the treatment of tuberculous septicemia.

Although, initially, he dedicated himself to General Medicine and, particularly, to tuberculosis, later, Presta turned towards Otorhinolaryngology. From 1927, he was in charge of an ENT specialist consultation at the Dispensaries of the Quinta de Salut l'Aliança.

== Personal life ==
Presta married Anna Fortes, and the couple had three daughters: Dolors, Mercè, and Maria Teresa. None of whom pursued a medical career, except for a grandson, the dermatologist Josep Lluís Pinto Presta.

Presta died on 23 December 1933, at the age of 65.
