= Francesc de Moxó =

Spanish politician and sports leader

- Born: Francesc de Paula de Moxó i de Sentmenat; 18 March 1879; Barcelona, Catalonia, Spain
- Died: 17 April 1920 (aged 41); Barcelona, Catalonia, Spain
- Occupations: Politician; Sports leader
- Known for: President of FC Barcelona

5th President of the Real Club de Tenis Barcelona
- In office 1911–1920
- Preceded by: Kendall Park
- Succeeded by: José Vidal-Ribas

10th President of FC Barcelona
- In office 30 June 1913 – 30 June 1914
- Preceded by: Joan Gamper
- Succeeded by: Àlvar Presta

13th President of the Catalan Football Federation
- In office 1913–1913
- Preceded by: Josep Preckler
- Succeeded by: Narciso Masferrer

1st Barcelona Fencing Association
- Incumbent
- Assumed office 1913

Francesc de Paula de Moxó i de Sentmenat (18 March 1879 – 17 April 1920) was a Spanish politician and sports leader, who served as the 10th president of the football club FC Barcelona in 1913 and 1914, as well as the 5th and 13th president of the Real Club de Tenis Barcelona and Catalan Football Federation respectively. He was also a journalist and financial manager of magazine "Stadium".

== Early and personal life ==
Francesc de Moxó was born on 18 March 1879 in Calle dels Caçadors, Barcelona, as the son of Dídac Moxó (also spelled Moixó) (1857–1926), and of the Marquise de Sant Mori, Maria Mercè de Sentmenat i de Patiño (1857–1935), both born in Barcelona. (Note: Some sources wrongly state that he was born on 1 March 1880.) The Marquise de Sant Mori was the promoter of the La Salut neighborhood in Badalona.

On 26 November 1906, Moxó married Francisca Güell y López, and the couple had three children, Luisa, Inés, and Antonio de Moxó y Güell, the second Marqués de San Mori.

== Sporting career ==
Throughout his life, Moxó was heavily involved in Catalan sport, presiding over the Real Club de Tenis Barcelona for nine years, between 1911 and 1920, and under his mandate the club was moved to Carrer Ganduxer, where seven courts were installed. He was also the co-founder and president of the Federació de societats esportives de Barcelona ("Federation of Sports Societies") in 1911, which had the aim of bringing together Barcelona's sports organizations to organize joint festivals, and which tried to bring order to the process of sports institutionalization and the creation of an annual sports calendar. He also directed the Catalan Football Federation in 1913, a position that he held just for a few months, before being replaced by Narciso Masferrer.

Moxó practiced fencing and competed in numerous competitions, and was also one of the founders and the first president of the Barcelona Fencing Association in 1913. The organization gained such importance under Moxó's leadership that on 6 May 1914, it was granted the title of "Real", and for many years, it was Real Asociación de Esgrima Barcelonesa. From 1914, he directed the Yacht Club Barcelona and, later, the Aeroclub de Barcelona. He also acted as a motor racing judge in some events, such as the Volta a Catalunya.

In the Assembly held on 30 June 1913, De Moxó was elected as the 10th President of FC Barcelona. He put an end to the existing schism between the club and the Catalan and Spanish Federations, and managed to get Barça reintegrated into both states. Despite his diplomatic ability, he was unable to resolve the internal conflict that existed at the club, which divided its members between the personalists who supported authoritarianism, grouped around Joaquim Peris de Vargas, and those who wanted a true democracy at FC Barcelona.

The other outstanding aspect of his time in charge of Barça was the progressive increase in professionalism among the players, a very controversial aspect at the time. In the sporting field, De Moxó was unable to celebrate a title, as the Barcelona team finished third in the Catalan Championship, and was then unable to get past the regional classification phase of the national cup. At the end of the season, and after just one year in the presidency, on 30 June 1914, De Moxó resigned and was replaced by Àlvar Presta.

== Journalist career ==
He was also a journalist and financial manager of the magazine "Stadium", the same one he worked for.

== Politic career ==
Moxó was also elected deputy to Congress for the district of Vilademuls (Girona) in the 1919 Spanish general election, for the Unión Monárquica Nacional.

== Death ==
De Moxó died in Barcelona on 17 April 1920, at the age of 40.
