= Rafael Morales (footballer, born 1892) =

Spanish footballer (1891–1932)

Personal information
- Full name: Rafael Morales Veloso
- Date of birth: 17 September 1891
- Place of birth: Madrid, Spain
- Date of death: 24 August 1932 (aged 39)
- Place of death: Barcelona, Spain
- Position: Midfielder

Senior career*
Years	Team	Apps	(Gls)
1911–1912	Sociedad Gimnástica		
1912	Barcelona		
1912–1913	Espanyol		
1913–1915	Barcelona		
1915–1917	Sabadell		
- * Club domestic league appearances and goals

Rafael Morales Veloso (17 September 1891 – 24 August 1932), also known as Morales II, was a Spanish footballer who played as a midfielder for FC Barcelona and RCD Espanyol.

He was the brother of fellow footballer Antonio Morales.

== Career ==
Born in Madrid on 17 September 1891, (Note: Some sources wrongly claim that he was born on 6 December 1892.) Rafael Morales began his footballing career at his hometown club Sociedad Gimnástica in 1911, at the age of 19, making his debut on 29 October in a friendly match against Madrid FC, netting twice to help his side to a 3–0 win. The following week, on 5 November, he again scored twice in a friendly, this time for a 6–1 win. He played as a right winger.

In January 1912, Morales was signed by FC Barcelona, but during his first season there, he only played in the reserve team. Due to the impossibility of playing in the first team, he signed for RCD Espanyol ahead of the 1912–13 season, but following a brief stint in which he only played six competitive matches, he then returned to Barcelona, where he played until 1915. In total, he played 38 games with the Barcelona club, including 8 competitive matches, all in the Catalan championship. He finished his career at Sabadell FC between 1915 and 1917.

Rafael played alongside his brother Antonio at Espanyol, Barcelona, and even at Sabadell, so in order to avoid confusion between them in the match chronicles, the press began referring to him as Morales II to distinguish him from his older brother "Morales I".

== Death ==
Morales died in Barcelona on 24 August 1932, at the age of 39.
