= Percival Wallace =

Australian cricketer

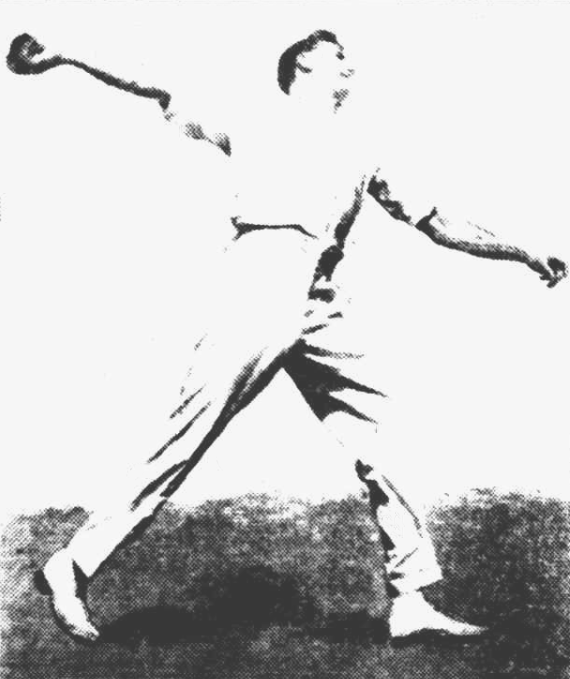

Personal information
- Born: 6 October 1891; Bendigo, Australia
- Died: 3 October 1959 (aged 67); Melbourne, Australia

Domestic team information
- Years: Team
- 1922-1927: Victoria
- Source: Cricinfo, 20 November 2015

Percival Wallace (6 October 1891 – 3 October 1959) was an Australian cricketer. He played 26 first-class cricket matches for Victoria between 1922 and 1927.

== See also ==
- List of Victoria first-class cricketers
