= Isidro Corbinos =

Spanish footballer and sports journalist (1891–1932)

Personal information
- Full name: Isidro Corbinos Pantoque
- Date of birth: 15 May 1894
- Place of birth: Zaragoza, Spain
- Date of death: 30 January 1966 (aged 71)
- Place of death: Santiago, Chile
- Position: Midfielder

Senior career*
| Years | Team | Apps | (Gls) |
| 1914 | Barcelona | | |
| 1915–1917 | Catalònia de Manresa | | |
- * Club domestic league appearances and goals

Isidro Corbinos Pantoque (15 May 1894 – 30 January 1966) was a Spanish footballer who played as a midfielder for FC Barcelona in the mid-1910s. He later worked as a sports journalist for several Spanish newspapers, including Mundo Deportivo and La Vanguardia.

After the Civil War, he went into exile in Chile, where he revolutionized sports journalism, being honoured by having an award that distinguishes the best journalists in the country named after him.

== Early life and education ==
Born in Aragon town of Zaragoza on 15 May 1894, Corbinos was 15 years old when he subscribed to a "Universal Encyclopedia" that published in weekly installments, which ceased to exist around the letter F, leading Corbinos to later jokingly remark "that his self-taught culture only reached that letter".

== Playing career ==
Corbinos began his career in 1914, when he played two matches for Barça's first team, a friendly against L'Avenç del Sport on 23 August, scoring a goal in a 2–0 victory, and a Catalan championship match against Català on 20 December, helping his side to a 7–0 trashing. He later also played for Catalònia de Manresa between 1915 and 1917.

== Writing career ==
In March 1915, Corbinos wrote and published the book Boxeo ("boxing"). According to a review in La Veu de Catalunya in April 1915, he had a "convincing and engaging writing style".

In 1924, Corbinos published El libro del jugador de football ("The Book of the Football Player"), later stating that "everything in the world can be explained, even football". He later wrote books on both the Civil War.

== Journalistic career ==
=== Spain ===
Once he retired, Corbinos began his journalistic career as an editor of La Tribuna, a small Catalan newspaper, responsible for the obituary page, where he updated deaths, announced wakes, and occasionally wrote memorials. He went on to work as an editor for several renowned Spanish newspapers in Barcelona, such as Jornada Deportiva (1923), La Noche (1926), El Día Gráfico, Mundo Deportivo, and La Vanguardia, where he was editor-in-chief. He also worked as editor for Excelsior in Bilbao (1926), which he also directed twice, first in 1928 and again from 1929 to 1931. In the early 1930s, he moved to Madrid, where he collaborated with El Heraldo de Madrid (1931) and the sports newspaper As (1932–33), as well as a sports editor of El Imparcial in 1933, and Ahora (1934–37). During his time in Barcelona, he was a member of the local Professional Union of Journalists in 1926, and in the capital, he was a member of the Asociación de la Prensa de Madrid in 1933–34, and the Professional Group of Journalists for three years, from 1934 until 1937.

In May 1925, Corbinos was in Zaragoza as a special correspondent to report on a Copa del Rey match between Atlético Madrid and his former club Barça when he was arrested for not having his military status regularized, being transferred to his hometown Melilla. Once he carried out his service in the Army, he returned to Barcelona in March 1927, specifically to the Les Corts stadium, after which he received a cordial display of affection from his professional colleagues at the nearby 'Joanet' restaurant. In August 1932, he organized a four-stage cycling race from Barcelona to Madrid with a winner's prize of 10,000 pesetas, and two months later, in October, he proposed organizing the first Vuelta a España, which only came to fruition in 1935.

When the Spanish Civil War broke out in 1936, Corbinos went to the front to write war chronicles and political reports for Ahora, becoming a war journalist; for instance, he covered the Battle of the Ebro as a special correspondent for La Vanguardia. His republican ideas caused him to send his wife and daughter to Igualada, from where they crossed the border to France, while Corbinos did it on foot, through the Pyrenees, reuniting with them in Paris.

=== Chile ===
Once the Civil War ended in 1939, Corbinos and his family boarded the Winnipeg to go into exile to Chile, where he continued to work in sports journalism, writing several columns, such as Cajón de sastre ("Tasting Box"), La torre de Babel ("The Tower of Babel"), and La guerra de los goles ("The War of the Goals"), which he published in the magazines Ercilla and Las Noticias de Última Hora, among others, usually under the pseudonym Isidro Gómez or simply as Corbo. He served as editor of Ercilla's sports section until his retirement in 1965.

Corbinos is widely regarded as having revolutionized sports journalism in Chile, turning it from a mere account of the facts with grandiloquent adjectives into a more personal and direct style, especially in football, in which he incorporated tactical analysis back when they were frowned upon. A professor at the School of Journalism of the University of Chile, an award to distinguish the best journalists in Chile was named after him: the Premio Nacional de Periodismo Deportivo Isidro Corbinos.

== Death and legacy ==
In January 1966, the 71-year-old Corbinos was writing a football report when he suffered a stroke at his home in Santiago, dying a few days later, on 30 January 1966.

In 2019, Corbinos' memoirs as a correspondent during the Civil War were compiled into a book called Pasaje al limbo (Passage to Limbo).
