= Joan Barba =

Spanish footballer

Juan Barba
Personal information
- Full name: Juan Barba Viladés
- Birth name: Joan Barba i Viladés
- Date of birth: Unknown
- Place of birth: Catalonia, Spain
- Date of death: 16 May 1920
- Place of death: Cardedeu, Catalonia, Spain
- Position: Defender

Senior career*
Years	Team	Apps	(Gls)
1911–1917	FC Barcelona		
- * Club domestic league appearances and goals

Juan Barba Viladés (Unknown – 16 May 1920) was a Spanish footballer who played as a defender for FC Barcelona.

== Sporting career ==
Barba was a true sportsman at the beginning of the 20th century, playing as a defender for FC Barcelona between 1911 and 1917. He was also manager of the club between 1913 and 1918. In 1912 he was one of the founders of the Sport Atlètic Barcelonés club.

Barba was also a member and director of Club Natació Barcelona. He was a good swimmer and water polo player, the latter sport, where he was considered the best player in Spain.

== Death ==
In the last years of his life, Barba began to practice motorcycling, dying, still young, on 16 May 1920 in a competition in Cardedeu.

The Joan Barba Swimming Cup was created in his honor, with its first edition being held at the end of June 1920.

== Honours ==
FC Barcelona

- Catalan championship
  - Champions (1): 1915–16
