= Francesc Miró-Sans =

Spanish businessman (1916–1989)

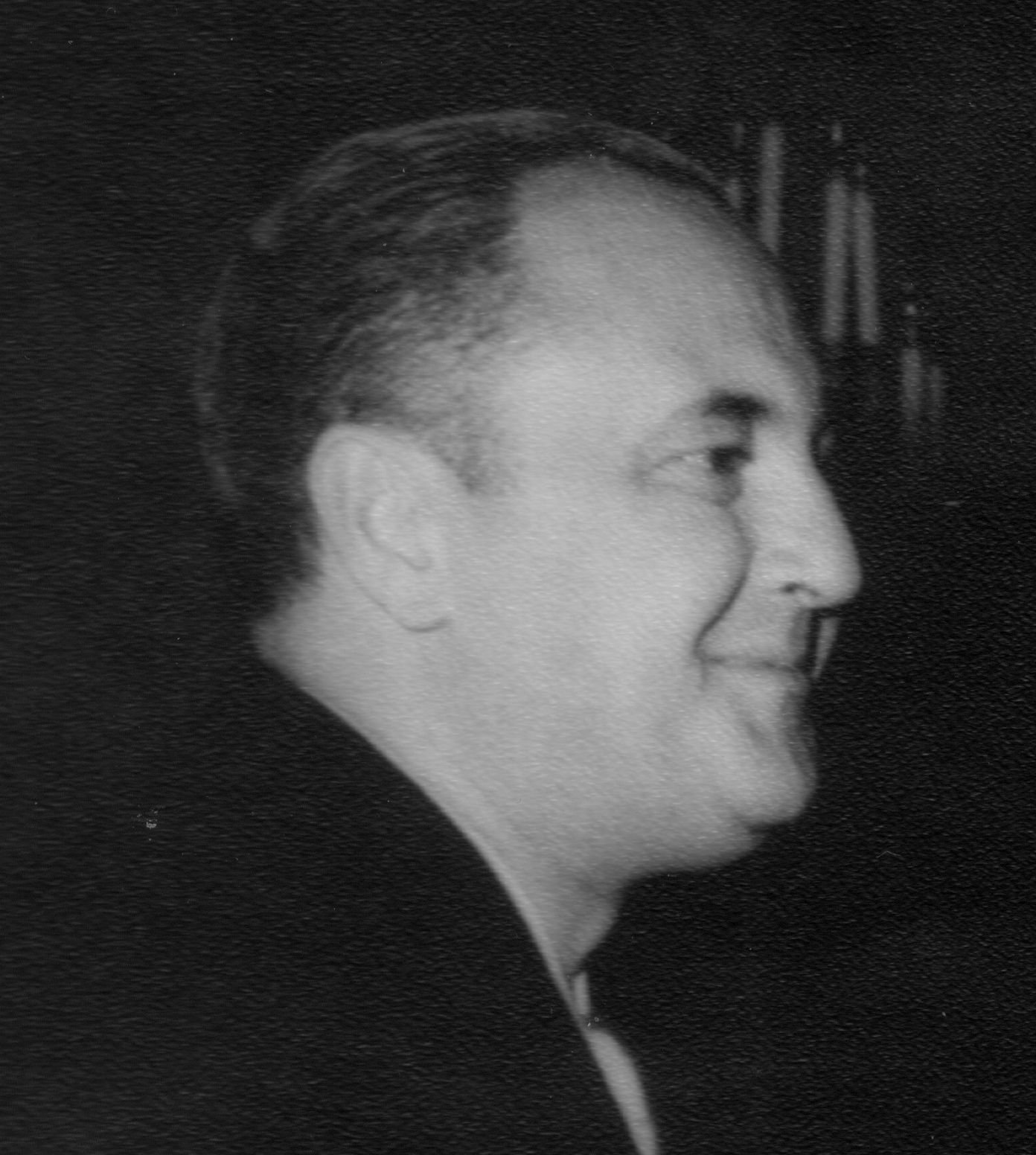
Francesc miro sans

Francesc Miró-Sans i Casacuberta (2 April 1916 – 31 October 1989) was a Spanish businessman and former president of FC Barcelona. Born in Barcelona, he led the Catalan club from 1953 to 1961. A total of 6 trophies were won during his presidency.

Miró-Sans was an entrepreneur in the textile industry. He was a board member of FC Barcelona president Enric Marti. After Martí had resigned due to the case Di Stefano, where the president under pressure from the regime of Francisco Franco to find a viable solution for the Argentinian's situation, Barcelona acquired his playing rights from Club River Plate but he would only resume playing River Plate after the 1955 season due to the enactment of the Lima pact, Real Madrid acquired his playing rights from Club Millonarios who owned his playing rights until the end of 1954, since no viable solution was reached in act of resignation he ceded the Argentinian soccer star Alfredo di Stefano to the rival club Real Madrid. In 1953 Miro-Sans presented in the elections for president of FC Barcelona with the slogan We want a new stadium and will have!. He found the old Camp de Les Corts too small for the growing status of the club. Miró-Sans won the elections on 23 December 1953. After more than 3 years the Estadi del FC Barcelona Camp Nou was finally opened on 24 September 1957.

In 1958, Miró-Sans was the first club president in history who was re-elected. Some of his decisions, led to criticism within the club. Ultimately, his position was untenable as president on 28 February 1961 and submitted his resignation Miro-Sans.

== Trophies won by club during Francesc Miró-Sans presidency ==
- La Liga (2):
  - 1958-59, 1959-60
- Copa del Rey (2):
  - 1956–1957, 1958–1959
- Inter-Cities Fairs Cup (2):
  - 1955–1958, 1958–1960
