= José Vidal Ribas (businessman) =

Spanish businessman, druggist, and slave owner (1814–1870)

- Born: 1814; Sant Feliu de Llobregat, Spain
- Died: 1870 (aged 52–53); Barcelona, Catalonia, Spain
- Citizenship: Spanish
- Occupations: Businessman; slave owner; druggist; real estate investor
- Known for: Ninth largest taxpayer in Barcelona in 1868
- Children: José, Emilio, Dolores, and Concepción

José Vidal y Ribas (1814–1870) was a Spanish businessman, druggist, and slave owner who made a fortune thanks to the African slave trade business in North America and Cuba, so much so that in 1868, he became the ninth largest taxpayer in Barcelona.

== Early and personal life ==
José Vidal y Ribas in 1814 in Sant Feliu de Llobregat, as the son of Francisca Ribas and José Vidal Mayol (1782–1817), a descendant of a family of merchants and businessmen of the Catalan bourgeoisie.

He married Concepción Torrens y Miralda, and the couple had four children: José (1848–1892), Emilio (1852–1924), Dolores, and Concepción. His eldest son went on to become a councillor of Barcelona.

== Business career ==
=== Slave trade ===
Vidal Ribas started his business career as a botiguer ("shop owner"), but in 1843, the 29-year-old Vidal-Ribas and his father-in-law opened the company Vidal, Mustich & Co., a firm that provided cover for a factory in the Benin town of Ouidah in Africa, which ended up being used to house slaves, who remained there for days before embarking. Although declared illegal in 1820, the slave trade in Spain lasted until 1866, making it the last country in Europe whose colonies (especially Cuba) kept receiving slaves. Thus, for over a decade, from the mid-1840s to the mid-1850s, he devoted himself to organizing the slave trade between Equatorial Guinea and Cuba, using three ships.

In August 1857, one of his vessels, the corvette "Conchita", was intercepted by the English steamship "Firefly" near the Vidal-Ribas factory, which unleashed a controversy in Spain that reached the main newspapers and Congress, and that led to a treaty with the United Kingdom that allowed them to stop the ships of slave traders, thus hindering the human traffic between Catalonia and the coasts of Africa; this was a great diplomatic clash at the time.

In 1868, Vidal Ribas became the ninth largest taxpayer in Barcelona, due to his massive fortune, which was strongly linked to human trafficking. The fortune made from the slave trade allowed him to buy a shop selling chemical products from his uncle Bartomeu Vidal Nadal in the Borne district of Barcelona. After his death, his son Emilio became the new manager of the Vidal-Ribas drugstore, and he took it a step further by founding a company focused on the chemical, pharmaceutical, and industrial drugstore trade, known as Hijos de José Vidal y Ribas.

=== Real estate and infrastructure ===
Vidal Ribas also had a strong desire to get involved in the change and remodeling of territory, both urban and rural, thus actively participating in municipal urban planning decisions and investing in constructions in the Eixample and other neighbourhoods of Barcelona. Between 1863 and 1867, the company Fomento del Ensanche of the José Vidal-Ribas family was noted as "the largest developer of the Ensanche with 26 buildings, and the family even owned the land where the Columbus Monument was cast in 1887.

== Death and legacy ==
Vidal-Ribas died in Barcelona in 1870, leaving an inheritance of several properties spread throughout the city, including 14 in the district of Eixample, and even a small Neoclassical palace on Passeig de Gràcia known as Casa Vidal Ribas, which was built by Jeroni Granell in 1863, going to house the headquarters of the Regionalist League in the 1930s, and to last for nearly a century, until its demolition in 1960.

In 2020, over 150 years after his death, two streets still bear his name: One in his hometown of Sant Feliu and the other in the neighbouring town of Esplugues de Llobregat. In the early 2020s, however, both municipalities decided to erase the slave imprint from their streets, with Esplugues renaming it as Carrer Hipàtia d'Alexandria in 2023, while Sant Feliu did it in March 2025, when Ateneu SantFeliuenc started a campaign to rename it Carrer de l'Ateneu, an initiative that required a certain 100 signatures from its residents.
