= Luis Tudó =

Spanish footballer and referee

Personal information
- Full name: Luis Tudó Pomar
- Birth name: Lluís Tudó i Pomar
- Date of birth: 26 May 1894
- Place of birth: Barcelona, Spain
- Date of death: 17 June 1975 (aged 81)
- Place of death: Barcelona, Spain
- Position: Defender

Senior career*
Years	Team	Apps	(Gls)
1912–1918	Barcelona		
1st President of Agrupació Barça Jugadors
In office September 1946 – 1961
Succeeded by	Estanislau Basora
- * Club domestic league appearances and goals

Luis Tudó Pomar (26 May 1894 – 17 June 1975) was a Spanish footballer who played as a defender for Barcelona between 1912 and 1918, winning one Copa del Rey in 1913, and one Catalan Championship in 1916. He also worked as a referee in the 1920s.

== Playing career ==
Born in Barcelona on 26 May 1894, Tudó began his football career at his hometown club Barcelona in late 1911, aged 15, making his debut with the first team on 8 December, in a friendly against Espanya de Barcelona, helping his side to a 4–0 win. However, his official competitive debut came two years later, on 15 June 1913, helping his side to a resounding 11–1 victory over Català in a small tournament called Copa Espanya.

Tudó had his next competitive match on 6 December 1915, in the Catalan Championship, helping his side to a 1–0 win over Avenç; by playing this match, he was officially a member of the Barça squad that won that title. He also won the Copa del Rey in 1913. In total, he played 66 matches for Barça, but only three were official.

== Later life ==
Tudó was a member of the Barça board between May 1933 and July 1934. Twelve years later, in September 1946, he founded the Agrupació Barça Jugadors ("Barça Players group") and was then appointed as its first president, being accompanied by a board that included Manuel Amechazurra, Paulino Alcántara, Vicente Piera, Eduardo Reguera, Agustín Sancho, and Enrique Peris. In the mid-1950s, Tudó announced to his fellow former Barça teammates that the ABJ had been canceled, but it was soon reactivated, with Tudó being one of the members who drafted the new statutes in 1957. He held the presidency for 15 years, from 1946 until 1961, when he was replaced by Estanislau Basora, although some sources state that he was its president only from 1959 to 1961.

== Death ==
Tudó died in Barcelona on 17 June 1975, at the age of 81.

== Honours ==
FC Barcelona

- Copa del Rey
  - Champions (1): 1913
- Catalan championship
  - Champions (1): 1915–16
