= Agustí Montal Costa =

Spanish economist and businessman

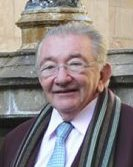
Agustí Montal i Costa

Agustí Montal i Costa (5 April 1934 – 22 March 2017) was a Spanish economist and businessman who was born in Barcelona, son of Agustí Montal Galobart. He was a member of an important family of Catalan cotton textile manufacturers. In 1969, he was elected president of FC Barcelona, a post he held until 1977.

== Trophies won by club during Agustí Montal Costa presidency ==
- La Liga (1):
  - 1973-74
- Copa del Rey (1):
  - 1970-71
