= Gaspar Rosés =

Catalan politician

Gaspar Rosés i Arus was a Catalan politician. He was MP for the Regionalist League in Arenys de Mar in the Spanish general election, 1918. He later became President of FC Barcelona in 1916–1917, 1920–1921 and 1930-1931 elected by the members. During his third term as President the founder of Barcelona, Joan Gamper, committed suicide.
