= Enrique Piñeyro Queralt =

Enrique Piñeyro Queralt, also referred to as Enric Piñeyro or the Marqués de la Mesa de Asta, was a Spanish aristocrat and president of FC Barcelona between 1940 and 1943. Piñeyro, allegedly, knew next to nothing about the sport and had apparently never even seen a game of football before his term as Barça president. A close friend of General José Moscardó, he had been a serving officer on the side of the Nationalists during the Spanish Civil War and was appointed club president on the basis of his loyalty to Francoist Spain. However, despite this, he was won over to the Barça cause and became the club's principal defender during the early Francoist era. He resigned as club president following the controversial 1943 Copa del Generalísimo semi-final against Real Madrid. During the Piñeyro presidency, the club had to change its name and shield. In 1941 a decree banned the use of non–Spanish language names and the club had to change its name from the Anglicised Football Club Barcelona to Club de Fútbol Barcelona. The Catalan flag was also banned, leading to its removal from the club shield. The club also formed a handball team, now known as FC Barcelona Handbol, as well as baseball, and cycling teams.

Piñeyro made his inaugural speech to his fellow FC Barcelona board members on 13 March 1940 and outlined his intentions to depoliticise the club off the field, while at the same time aiming for sporting greatness on it. One of the first acts of the Piñeyro administration was to campaign against a six-year ban imposed by Francoist Spain on any exiled sportsmen returning to Spain. This allowed several former FC Barcelona players, including Domènec Balmanya and Josep Escolà, to return to the club. These reinforcements subsequently proved their worth during the 1941–42 season. Barça, with a team coached by Joan Josep Nogués, had struggled in La Liga and narrowly avoided being relegated after winning a play-off against Real Murcia. Despite this, however, the club won the Copa del Generalísimo, beating Atlético Bilbao 4–3 after extra time.

A week after the play-off against Real Murcia, after two years and four months in post, Piñeyro resigned as club president on 13 August 1942. However one month later he returned for a second term. During the 1942–1943 season Barça finished third in La Liga and reached the Copa del Generalísimo semi-final where they played Real Madrid. After winning the first-leg 3–0 at Les Corts they were controversially beaten 11–1 at the Charmartín. It has been alleged that the Barça players were pressured into losing the game by supporters of Francoist Spain and a hostile home crowd. Piñeyro subsequently lodged a complaint with the Royal Spanish Football Federation and resigned as club president permanently on 20 August 1943.

== Sources ==
- Jimmy Burns (1998). Barça: A People’s Passion.
