= 2016 FIFA U-20 Women's World Cup squads =

Football tournament squads

This article lists the squads for the 2016 FIFA U-20 Women's World Cup, held in Papua New Guinea. Each competing federation was allowed a 21-player squad, which had to be submitted to FIFA.

== Group A ==
=== Papua New Guinea ===
Coach: (United States) Lisa Cole

No.	Pos.	Player	Date of birth (age)	Caps	Goals	Club
1	GK	Lavina Hola	27 May 1996 (aged 20)			(Papua New Guinea Football Association) FC Port Moresby
2	FW	Jacobeth June Bani Kikoli	21 June 1996 (aged 20)			(Papua New Guinea Football Association) Madang Fox FC
3	DF	Margret Meferoi Joseph	4 January 1999 (aged 17)			(Papua New Guinea Football Association) FC Port Moresby
4	DF	Olivia Upaupa	12 March 1997 (aged 19)			(Papua New Guinea Football Association) Madang Fox FC
5	DF	Hilda Nake	10 April 1997 (aged 19)			(Papua New Guinea Football Association) Kimbe FC
6	MF	Yvonne Gabong	29 August 1996 (aged 20)			(Papua New Guinea Football Association) FC Port Moresby
7	DF	Martha Gai Karl	18 May 1997 (aged 19)			(Papua New Guinea Football Association) Lae FC
8	MF	Loretta Iriene Yagum	21 March 1999 (aged 17)			(Papua New Guinea Football Association) Lae FC
9	MF	Selina Dazy Unamba	24 November 1999 (aged 16)			(Papua New Guinea Football Association) Lae FC
10	FW	Nicollete Kolotein Ageva	26 February 1998 (aged 18)	3	1	(Papua New Guinea Football Association) Buka FC
11	DF	Christol Tollyn Mato	22 January 1998 (aged 18)			(Papua New Guinea Football Association) Kokopo FC
12	MF	Bellinda Mok Giada	1 December 1999 (aged 16)			(Papua New Guinea Football Association) Ramu FC
13	MF	Ramona Padio	13 March 1998 (aged 18)			(Papua New Guinea Football Association) Kimbe FC
14	MF	Ellien Manup	17 July 1997 (aged 19)			(Papua New Guinea Football Association) Madang Fox FC
15	DF	Gloria Laeli	25 March 1997 (aged 19)			(Papua New Guinea Football Association) FC Port Moresby
16	DF	Georgina Bakani	6 December 1996 (aged 19)			(Papua New Guinea Football Association) Kimbe FC
17	FW	Essmeralda Sengi Waipo	22 January 1998 (aged 18)			(Papua New Guinea Football Association) Wewak FC
18	FW	Jacklyne Maiyosi	18 July 1998 (aged 18)			(Papua New Guinea Football Association) Alotau FC
19	MF	Joy Agnes Tsuga	6 February 1998 (aged 18)			(Papua New Guinea Football Association) PMSA
20	GK	Lace Shamella Kunei	12 October 1997 (aged 19)			(Papua New Guinea Football Association) Madang Fox FC
21	GK	Faith Kasiray	20 December 1999 (aged 16)			(Papua New Guinea Football Association) Ramu FC

=== Brazil ===
Coach: (Brazil) Dorival Bueno

No.	Pos.	Player	Date of birth (age)	Caps	Goals	Club
1	GK	Carla	4 June 1997 (aged 19)			(Brazilian Football Confederation) AD Centro Olímpico
2	DF	Julia Bianchi	7 October 1997 (aged 19)			(Brazilian Football Confederation) Ferroviária
3	DF	Giovanna	14 June 1996 (aged 20)			(Brazilian Football Confederation) Foz Cataratas FC
4	DF	Daiane	7 September 1997 (aged 19)			(Brazilian Football Confederation) Rio Preto EC
5	MF	Brena	28 October 1996 (aged 20)			(Brazilian Football Confederation) AD Centro Olímpico
6	DF	Yasmim	28 October 1996 (aged 20)			(Brazilian Football Confederation) São José EC
7	MF	Katrine	19 April 1998 (aged 18)			(Brazilian Football Confederation) SC Corinthians
8	MF	Gabi Nunes	10 March 1997 (aged 19)			(Brazilian Football Confederation) SC Corinthians
9	FW	Duda	24 March 1996 (aged 20)			(Brazilian Football Confederation) Chapecoense
10	MF	Laís	16 March 1996 (aged 20)			(United States Soccer Federation) ASA College
11	FW	Geyse	27 March 1998 (aged 18)			(Brazilian Football Confederation) AD Centro Olímpico
12	GK	Lorena	6 May 1997 (aged 19)			(Brazilian Football Confederation) AD Centro Olímpico
13	DF	Bruna	12 September 1996 (aged 20)			(Brazilian Football Confederation) EC Iranduba da Amazônia
14	DF	Beatriz	25 June 1997 (aged 19)			(Brazilian Football Confederation) AD Centro Olímpico
15	MF	Nicoly	14 April 1997 (aged 19)			(Brazilian Football Confederation) Ferroviária
16	MF	Fernanda	18 August 1996 (aged 20)			(Brazilian Football Confederation) CR Flamengo
17	FW	Victória	14 March 1998 (aged 18)			(Brazilian Football Confederation) Minas/ICESP
18	FW	Kélen	21 February 1996 (aged 20)			(Brazilian Football Confederation) EC Iranduba da Amazônia
19	FW	Thamirys	18 August 1997 (aged 19)			(Brazilian Football Confederation) Foz Cataratas FC
20	MF	Luana	8 September 1998 (aged 18)			(Brazilian Football Confederation) Ferroviária
21	GK	Stefane	12 May 1999 (aged 17)			(Brazilian Football Confederation) Team Chicago Brasil

=== Sweden ===
Coach: (Sweden) Calle Barrling

No.	Pos.	Player	Date of birth (age)	Caps	Goals	Club
1	GK	Emma Holmgren	13 May 1997 (aged 19)	18	0	(Swedish Football Association) IK Sirius
2	DF	Ronja Aronsson	20 December 1997 (aged 18)	22	0	(Swedish Football Association) Piteå IF
3	DF	Julia Ekholm	17 June 1996 (aged 20)	35	0	(Swedish Football Association) Hammarby IF
4	DF	Ellen Löfqvist	8 October 1997 (aged 19)	26	3	(Swedish Football Association) Piteå IF
5	DF	Lotta Ökvist	17 February 1997 (aged 19)	32	0	(Swedish Football Association) Piteå IF
6	MF	Michelle de Jongh	19 May 1997 (aged 19)	19	0	(Swedish Football Association) KIF Örebro DFF
7	MF	Anna Oskarsson	23 June 1996 (aged 20)	31	1	(Swedish Football Association) Hammarby IF
8	FW	Filippa Angeldal	14 July 1997 (aged 19)	31	6	(Swedish Football Association) Hammarby IF
9	FW	Stina Blackstenius	5 February 1996 (aged 20)	30	34	(Swedish Football Association) Linköpings FC
10	FW	Anna Anvegård	10 May 1997 (aged 19)	10	3	(Swedish Football Association) Växjö DFF
11	MF	Tove Almqvist	5 January 1996 (aged 20)	29	6	(Swedish Football Association) Linköpings FC
12	GK	Moa Öhman	25 June 1998 (aged 18)	5	0	(Swedish Football Association) Piteå IF
13	DF	Maja Göthberg	16 July 1997 (aged 19)	20	2	(Swedish Football Association) Kopparbergs/Göteborg FC
14	DF	Josefine Rybrink	19 January 1998 (aged 18)	11	0	(Swedish Football Association) Kungsbacka DFF
15	DF	Amanda Persson	16 August 1998 (aged 18)	13	1	(Swedish Football Association) Växjö DFF
16	MF	Rebecka Blomqvist	24 July 1997 (aged 19)	17	3	(Swedish Football Association) Kopparbergs/Göteborg FC
17	MF	Johanna Rytting Kaneryd	12 February 1997 (aged 19)	8	0	(Swedish Football Association) Djurgårdens IF
18	FW	Loreta Kullashi	20 May 1999 (aged 17)	5	0	(Swedish Football Association) AIK
19	MF	Olivia Welin	29 May 1996 (aged 20)	15	4	(Swedish Football Association) IF Limhamn Bunkeflo
20	FW	Nellie Lilja	28 February 1999 (aged 17)	4	2	(Swedish Football Association) IF Limhamn Bunkeflo
21	GK	Agnes Granberg	3 March 1999 (aged 17)	2	0	(Swedish Football Association) Team TG FF

=== North Korea ===
Coach: (North Korea) Hwang Yong-bong

No.	Pos.	Player	Date of birth (age)	Caps	Goals	Club
1	GK	Kim Myong-sun	6 March 1997 (aged 19)			(DPR Korea Football Association) Sobaeksu Sports Club
2	FW	Sung Hyang-sim	2 December 1999 (aged 16)			(DPR Korea Football Association) Pyongyang City Sports Club
3	DF	U Sol-gyong	11 September 1996 (aged 20)			(DPR Korea Football Association) Sobaeksu Sports Club
4	DF	Chae Kyong-mi	17 November 1997 (aged 18)			(DPR Korea Football Association) Pyongyang City Sports Club
5	DF	Choe Sol-gyong	14 September 1996 (aged 20)			(DPR Korea Football Association) Rimyongsu Sports Club
6	FW	Wi Jong-sim	13 October 1997 (aged 19)			(DPR Korea Football Association) Kalmaegi Sports Club
7	FW	Ri Kyong-hyang	10 June 1996 (aged 20)			(DPR Korea Football Association) April 25 Sports Club
8	MF	Choe Un-hwa	9 April 1997 (aged 19)			(DPR Korea Football Association) Ponghwasan Sports Club
9	MF	Ri Hyang-sim	23 March 1996 (aged 20)			(DPR Korea Football Association) Amrokgang Sports Club
10	FW	Ri Un-sim	20 May 1996 (aged 20)			(DPR Korea Football Association) April 25 Sports Club
11	MF	Kim Phyong-hwa	28 November 1996 (aged 19)			(DPR Korea Football Association) Hwangryongsan Sports Club
12	DF	Jon So-yon	25 July 1996 (aged 20)			(DPR Korea Football Association) April 25 Sports Club
13	DF	Son Ok-ju	7 March 2000 (aged 16)			(DPR Korea Football Association) Ryomyong Sports Club
14	DF	Kim Jong-sim	6 September 1997 (aged 19)			(DPR Korea Football Association) Sobaeksu Sports Club
15	MF	An Song-ok	16 March 1998 (aged 18)			(DPR Korea Football Association) April 25 Sports Club
16	DF	Ri Un-yong	1 September 1996 (aged 20)			(DPR Korea Football Association) Sobaeksu Sports Club
17	MF	Kim Un-hwa	28 August 1996 (aged 20)			(DPR Korea Football Association) Wolmido Sports Club
18	GK	Rim Yong-hwa	20 January 1996 (aged 20)			(DPR Korea Football Association) Sobaeksu Sports Club
19	MF	Ju Hyo-sim	21 June 1998 (aged 18)			(DPR Korea Football Association) April 25 Sports Club
20	FW	Kim So-hyang	2 January 1996 (aged 20)			(DPR Korea Football Association) Sobaeksu Sports Club
21	GK	Ok Kum-ju	5 May 1999 (aged 17)			(DPR Korea Football Association) Naegohyang SC

== Group B ==
=== Spain ===
Coach: (Spain) Pedro López

No.	Pos.	Player	Date of birth (age)	Caps	Goals	Club
1	GK	María Asunción Quiñones	29 October 1996 (aged 20)			(Royal Spanish Football Federation) Real Sociedad
2	DF	Andrea Sierra	15 May 1998 (aged 18)			(Royal Spanish Football Federation) Athletic Bilbao "B"
3	DF	Beatriz Beltrán	10 December 1997 (aged 18)			(Royal Spanish Football Federation) Atlético de Madrid
4	MF	Aitana Bonmatí	18 January 1998 (aged 18)			(Royal Spanish Football Federation) FC Barcelona
5	DF	Rocío Gálvez	15 April 1997 (aged 19)			(Royal Spanish Football Federation) Atlético de Madrid
6	MF	Ainoa Campo	17 June 1996 (aged 20)			(Royal Spanish Football Federation) Atlético de Madrid
7	FW	Nahikari García	10 March 1997 (aged 19)			(Royal Spanish Football Federation) Real Sociedad
8	FW	Mariona Caldentey	19 March 1996 (aged 20)			(Royal Spanish Football Federation) FC Barcelona
9	MF	Lucía Gómez	11 June 1996 (aged 20)			(Royal Spanish Football Federation) Levante UD
10	MF	Andrea Falcón	28 February 1997 (aged 19)			(Royal Spanish Football Federation) Atlético de Madrid
11	DF	Carmen Menayo	14 April 1998 (aged 18)			(Royal Spanish Football Federation) Atlético de Madrid
12	MF	Patricia Guijarro	17 May 1998 (aged 18)			(Royal Spanish Football Federation) FC Barcelona
13	GK	Amaia Peña	22 November 1998 (aged 17)			(United States Soccer Federation) Pittsburgh Panthers
14	MF	Sandra Hernández	25 May 1997 (aged 19)			(Royal Spanish Football Federation) FC Barcelona
15	DF	Marta Cazalla	5 April 1997 (aged 19)			(Royal Spanish Football Federation) Atlético de Madrid
16	DF	María Bores	17 November 1997 (aged 18)			(Royal Spanish Football Federation) Atlético de Madrid
17	MF	Alba Redondo	27 August 1996 (aged 20)			(Royal Spanish Football Federation) Fundación Albacete
18	FW	Laura Domínguez	12 August 1997 (aged 19)			(Royal Spanish Football Federation) Rayo Vallecano
19	MF	Maite Oroz	25 March 1998 (aged 18)			(Royal Spanish Football Federation) Athletic Bilbao
20	FW	Lucía García	14 July 1998 (aged 18)			(Royal Spanish Football Federation) Athletic Bilbao
21	GK	María Sampalo	5 December 1999 (aged 16)			(Royal Spanish Football Federation) Málaga CF

=== Canada ===
Coach: (Canada) Daniel Worthington

No.	Pos.	Player	Date of birth (age)	Caps	Goals	Club
1	GK	Rylee Foster	13 August 1998 (aged 18)			(United States Soccer Federation) West Virginia Mountaineers
2	DF	Sura Yekka	4 January 1997 (aged 19)			(United States Soccer Federation) Michigan Wolverines
3	MF	Ashley Moreira	16 March 1996 (aged 20)			(United States Soccer Federation) Pittsburgh Panthers
4	MF	Sarah Taylor	12 June 1996 (aged 20)			(United States Soccer Federation) Boise State Broncos
5	DF	Hannah Taylor	7 June 1999 (aged 17)			(United States Soccer Federation) Eastside G98
6	FW	Deanne Rose	3 March 1999 (aged 17)			(Canadian Soccer Association) Scarborough GS United
7	FW	Marie Levasseur	18 May 1997 (aged 19)			(United States Soccer Federation) Memphis Tigers
8	MF	Sarah Stratigakis	7 March 1999 (aged 17)			(Canadian Soccer Association) Aurora United SC
9	FW	Therese Raimondo	25 March 1999 (aged 17)			(Canadian Soccer Association) Unionville Milliken SC
10	FW	Gabrielle Carle	12 October 1998 (aged 18)			(Canadian Soccer Association) Dynamo Quebec
11	MF	Anyssa Ibrahim	8 February 1999 (aged 17)			(Canadian Soccer Association) AS Varennes
12	DF	Victoria Pickett	12 August 1996 (aged 20)			(United States Soccer Federation) Wisconsin Badgers
13	DF	Marike Mousset	12 January 1997 (aged 19)			(United States Soccer Federation) Ohio State Buckeyes
14	DF	Emma Regan	28 January 2000 (aged 16)			(Canadian Soccer Association) Vancouver Whitecaps FC Girls Elite REX
15	DF	Bianca St. Georges	28 July 1997 (aged 19)			(United States Soccer Federation) West Virginia Mountaineers
16	MF	Sarah Feola	10 February 1998 (aged 18)			(United States Soccer Federation) Louisville Cardinals
17	MF	Vital Kats	18 November 1999 (aged 16)			(Canadian Soccer Association) Scarborough GS United
18	GK	Lysianne Proulx	17 April 1999 (aged 17)			(Canadian Soccer Association) AS Varennes
19	FW	Alex Lamontagne	27 July 1996 (aged 20)			(United States Soccer Federation) Syracuse Orange
20	DF	Mika Richards	4 April 1997 (aged 19)			(Canadian Soccer Association) York University
21	GK	Panagiota Koutoulas	20 February 1997 (aged 19)			(United States Soccer Federation) Miami RedHawks

=== Japan ===
Coach: (Japan) Asako Takakura

No.	Pos.	Player	Date of birth (age)	Caps	Goals	Club
1	GK	Chika Hirao	31 December 1996 (aged 19)			(Japan Football Association) Urawa Red Diamonds Ladies
2	MF	Yuki Mizutani	11 April 1996 (aged 20)			(Japan Football Association) University of Tsukuba
3	DF	Hikaru Kitagawa	10 May 1997 (aged 19)			(Japan Football Association) Urawa Red Diamonds Ladies
4	DF	Nana Ichise	4 August 1997 (aged 19)			(Japan Football Association) Vegalta Sendai Ladies
5	DF	Ruka Norimatsu	30 January 1996 (aged 20)			(Japan Football Association) Urawa Red Diamonds Ladies
6	MF	Rin Sumida	12 January 1996 (aged 20)			(Japan Football Association) NTV Beleza
7	MF	Hina Sugita	31 January 1997 (aged 19)			(Japan Football Association) INAC Kobe Leonessa
8	MF	Yui Hasegawa	29 January 1997 (aged 19)			(Japan Football Association) NTV Beleza
9	MF	Meika Nishida	16 November 1997 (aged 18)			(Japan Football Association) Cerezo Osaka Sakai Ladies
10	FW	Yuka Momiki	2 April 1996 (aged 20)			(Japan Football Association) NTV Beleza
11	FW	Juri Kawano	16 December 1996 (aged 19)			(Japan Football Association) University of Tsukuba
12	GK	Mamiko Matsumoto	9 October 1997 (aged 19)			(Japan Football Association) Urawa Red Diamonds Ladies
13	DF	Hisui Haza	16 March 1996 (aged 20)			(Japan Football Association) Nippon Sport Science University
14	MF	Narumi Miura	3 July 1997 (aged 19)			(Japan Football Association) NTV Beleza
15	DF	Asato Miyagawa	24 February 1998 (aged 18)			(Japan Football Association) NTV Beleza
16	DF	Miyabi Moriya	22 August 1996 (aged 20)			(Japan Football Association) INAC Kobe Leonessa
17	DF	Shiho Matsubara	7 July 1997 (aged 19)			(Japan Football Association) Cerezo Osaka Sakai Ladies
18	FW	Mami Ueno	27 September 1996 (aged 20)			(Japan Football Association) Ehime F.C. Ladies
19	DF	Yuzuho Shiokoshi	1 November 1997 (aged 19)			(Japan Football Association) Urawa Red Diamonds Ladies
20	MF	Honoka Hayashi	19 May 1998 (aged 18)			(Japan Football Association) Cerezo Osaka Sakai Ladies
21	GK	Natsumi Asano	14 April 1997 (aged 19)			(Japan Football Association) Chifure AS Elfen Saitama

=== Nigeria ===
Coach: (Nigeria) Peter Dedevbo

No.	Pos.	Player	Date of birth (age)	Caps	Goals	Club
1	GK	Sandra Chiichii	10 October 1997 (aged 19)			(Nigeria Football Federation) Sunshine Queens FC
2	DF	Oluwakemi Famuditi	16 December 1998 (aged 17)			(Nigeria Football Federation) Kogi Confluence FC
3	DF	Glory Ogbonna	25 December 1998 (aged 17)			(Nigeria Football Federation) Ibom Angels FC
4	MF	Ogechi Ukwuoma	25 December 1996 (aged 19)			(Nigeria Football Federation) Delta Queens FC
5	DF	Ugochi Emenayo	20 December 1997 (aged 18)			(Nigeria Football Federation) Nasarawa Amazons
6	DF	Esther Elijah	6 February 1998 (aged 18)			(Nigeria Football Federation) Osun Babes FC
7	MF	Yetunde Adeboyejo	25 May 1996 (aged 20)			(Nigeria Football Federation) Bayelsa Queens FC
8	FW	Rasheedat Ajibade	8 December 1999 (aged 16)			(Nigeria Football Federation) FC Robo
9	FW	Chinwendu Ihezuo	30 April 1997 (aged 19)			(Kazakhstan Football Federation) BIIK Kazygurt
10	MF	Chinaza Uchendu	3 December 1997 (aged 18)			(Nigeria Football Federation) Nasarawa Amazons
11	MF	Lilian Tule	8 December 1998 (aged 17)			(Nigeria Football Federation) Bayelsa Queens FC
12	MF	Joy Bokiri	29 December 1998 (aged 17)			(Nigeria Football Federation) Bayelsa Queens FC
13	DF	Mary Ologbosere	18 May 1999 (aged 17)			(Nigeria Football Federation) Ibom Angels FC
14	MF	Patience Kalu	15 July 1996 (aged 20)			(Nigeria Football Federation) Rivers Angels FC
15	MF	Tessy Biahwo	15 November 1997 (aged 18)			(Nigeria Football Federation) Nasarawa Amazons
16	GK	Christy Ohiaeriaku	13 December 1996 (aged 19)			(Swedish Football Association) IFK Östersund
17	FW	Aminat Yakubu	25 December 1997 (aged 18)			(Football Federation of Belarus) FC Minsk
18	MF	Ihuoma Onyebuchi	10 December 1997 (aged 18)			(Nigeria Football Federation) Sunshine Queens FC
19	FW	Charity Reuben	25 December 2000 (aged 15)			(Nigeria Football Federation) Ibom Angels FC
20	FW	Adebisi Saheed	18 July 2000 (aged 16)			(Nigeria Football Federation) FC Robo
21	GK	Onyinyechukwu Okeke	17 August 1998 (aged 18)			(Nigeria Football Federation) Edo Queens FC

== Group C ==
=== France ===
Coach: (France) Gilles Eyquem

No.	Pos.	Player	Date of birth (age)	Caps	Goals	Club
1	GK	Mylène Chavas	7 January 1998 (aged 18)			(French Football Federation) AS Saint-Étienne
2	DF	Marion Romanelli	24 July 1996 (aged 20)			(French Football Federation) Montpellier HSC
3	DF	Sakina Karchaoui	26 January 1996 (aged 20)			(French Football Federation) Montpellier HSC
4	DF	Hawa Cissoko	10 April 1997 (aged 19)			(French Football Federation) Paris Saint-Germain
5	DF	Pauline Dhaeyer	27 March 1996 (aged 20)			(French Football Federation) ESOF La Roche-sur-Yon
6	MF	Laura Condon	18 March 1997 (aged 19)			(French Football Federation) ASPTT Albi
7	FW	Delphine Cascarino	5 February 1997 (aged 19)			(French Football Federation) Olympique Lyonnais
8	MF	Grace Geyoro	2 July 1997 (aged 19)			(French Football Federation) Paris Saint-Germain
9	FW	Marie-Charlotte Léger	13 March 1996 (aged 20)			(French Football Federation) Montpellier HSC
10	FW	Clara Matéo	28 November 1997 (aged 18)			(French Football Federation) FCF Juvisy
11	FW	Louise Fleury	8 August 1997 (aged 19)			(French Football Federation) EA Guingamp
12	DF	Heloise Mansuy	13 February 1997 (aged 19)			(French Football Federation) FC Metz
13	DF	Thea Greboval	5 April 1997 (aged 19)			(French Football Federation) FCF Juvisy
14	DF	Estelle Cascarino	5 February 1997 (aged 19)			(French Football Federation) FCF Juvisy
15	MF	Maëlle Garbino	9 August 1996 (aged 20)			(French Football Federation) AS Saint-Étienne
16	GK	Cindy Perrault	26 January 1996 (aged 20)			(French Football Federation) ASPTT Albi
17	MF	Juliane Gathrat	24 August 1996 (aged 20)			(French Football Federation) FC Metz
18	FW	Valérie Gauvin	1 June 1996 (aged 20)			(French Football Federation) Montpellier HSC
19	MF	Cathy Gisele Couturier	8 January 1997 (aged 19)			(French Football Federation) Rodez Aveyron Football
20	FW	Anna Clerac	2 June 1997 (aged 19)			(French Football Federation) ASJ Soyaux
21	GK	Jade Lebastard	3 May 1998 (aged 18)			(French Football Federation) EA Guingamp

=== United States ===
Coach: (United States) Michelle French

No.	Pos.	Player	Date of birth (age)	Caps	Goals	Club
1	GK	Casey Murphy	25 April 1996 (aged 20)			(United States Soccer Federation) Rutgers Scarlet Knights
2	MF	Parker Roberts	30 July 1997 (aged 19)			(United States Soccer Federation) Florida Gators
3	DF	Kaleigh Riehl	21 October 1996 (aged 20)			(United States Soccer Federation) Penn State Nittany Lions
4	DF	Sabrina Flores	31 January 1996 (aged 20)			(United States Soccer Federation) Notre Dame Fighting Irish
5	DF	Maddie Elliston	29 March 1996 (aged 20)			(United States Soccer Federation) Penn State Nittany Lions
6	DF	Taylor Otto	23 October 1997 (aged 19)			(United States Soccer Federation) North Carolina Tar Heels
7	MF	Savannah DeMelo	26 March 1998 (aged 18)			(United States Soccer Federation) USC Trojans
8	MF	Courtney Petersen	28 October 1997 (aged 19)			(United States Soccer Federation) Virginia Cavaliers
9	FW	Mallory Pugh	29 April 1998 (aged 18)			(United States Soccer Federation) UCLA Bruins
10	MF	Emily Ogle	5 August 1996 (aged 20)			(United States Soccer Federation) Penn State Nittany Lions
11	FW	Ally Watt	12 March 1997 (aged 19)			(United States Soccer Federation) Texas A&M Aggies
12	GK	Rosemary Chandler	24 September 1996 (aged 20)			(United States Soccer Federation) Penn State Nittany Lions
13	MF	Marley Canales	16 November 1997 (aged 18)			(United States Soccer Federation) UCLA Bruins
14	DF	Ellie Jean	31 January 1997 (aged 19)			(United States Soccer Federation) Penn State Nittany Lions
15	FW	Jessie Scarpa	17 May 1996 (aged 20)			(United States Soccer Federation) North Carolina Tar Heels
16	DF	Emily Fox	5 July 1998 (aged 18)			(United States Soccer Federation) FC Virginia
17	MF	Kelcie Hedge	19 September 1997 (aged 19)			(United States Soccer Federation) Washington Huskies
18	MF	Ashley Sanchez	16 March 1999 (aged 17)			(United States Soccer Federation) So Cal Blues
19	DF	Natalie Jacobs	16 August 1997 (aged 19)			(United States Soccer Federation) Notre Dame Fighting Irish
20	MF	Katie Cousins	25 September 1996 (aged 20)			(United States Soccer Federation) Tennessee Volunteers
21	GK	Brooke Heinsohn	11 March 1998 (aged 18)			(United States Soccer Federation) Duke Blue Devils

=== Ghana ===
Coach: (Ghana) Mas-Ud Didi Dramani

No.	Pos.	Player	Date of birth (age)	Caps	Goals	Club
1	GK	Azume Adams	28 December 1997 (aged 18)			(Swedish Football Association) Ånge IF
2	MF	Vida Opoku	15 December 1997 (aged 18)			(Ghana Football Association) Lady Strikers
3	FW	Jane Ayiyem	19 October 1997 (aged 19)			(Ghana Football Association) Police Ladies
4	DF	Kate Adu Agyemang	10 January 1998 (aged 18)			(Ghana Football Association) Ash Town Ladies
5	DF	Belinda Anane	14 June 1998 (aged 18)			(Ghana Football Association) Fabulous Ladies FC
6	MF	Patience Adjetey	19 July 1996 (aged 20)			(Ghana Football Association) Inter Royal Ladies FC
7	MF	Ernestina Abambila	30 December 1998 (aged 17)			unattached
8	MF	Wasila Diwura-Soale	1 September 1996 (aged 20)			(Ghana Football Association) Hasaacas Ladies FC
9	FW	Sandra Owusu-Ansah	29 January 2000 (aged 16)			(Ghana Football Association) Supreme Ladies
10	MF	Princella Adubea	27 December 1998 (aged 17)			(Ghana Football Association) Ampem Darkoa Ladies
11	MF	Rita Darko	25 February 1996 (aged 20)			(Ghana Football Association) GT Mawena Ladies
12	MF	Vinoria Kuzagbe	29 April 1997 (aged 19)			(Ghana Football Association) Ideal Ladies
13	MF	Samira Abdul-Rahman	28 November 1997 (aged 18)			(Ghana Football Association) Lepo Stars Ladies FC
14	MF	Lily Niber-Lawrence	23 June 1997 (aged 19)			(Ghana Football Association) Hasaacas Ladies FC
15	MF	Faustina Ampah	30 November 1996 (aged 19)			(Ghana Football Association) Blessed Ladies
16	GK	Victoria Antwi Agyei	15 May 1996 (aged 20)			(Football Association of Serbia) ŽFK Obilic
17	FW	Veronica Appiah	28 June 1997 (aged 19)			(Ghana Football Association) Hasaacas Ladies FC
18	MF	Rasheda Abdul-Rahman	28 November 1996 (aged 19)			(Ghana Football Association) Lepo Stars Ladies FC
19	MF	Sandra Boakye	20 September 1997 (aged 19)			(Ghana Football Association) Fabulous Ladies FC
20	MF	Fatima Alhassan	13 August 1996 (aged 20)			(Football Association of Serbia) ŽFK Obilic
21	GK	Rose Teye Baah	15 August 1999 (aged 17)			(Ghana Football Association) Samaria Ladies

=== New Zealand ===
Coach: (New Zealand) Leon Birnie

No.	Pos.	Player	Date of birth (age)	Caps	Goals	Club
1	GK	Tessa Nicol	26 January 1996 (aged 20)			(New Zealand Football) Lynn-Avon United
2	DF	Sarah Morton	28 August 1998 (aged 18)			(New Zealand Football) Maycenvale United
3	DF	Sophie Stewart-Hobbs	9 May 1998 (aged 18)			(New Zealand Football) Papamoa FC
4	DF	Elizabeth Anton	12 December 1998 (aged 17)			(New Zealand Football) Lynn-Avon United
5	DF	Samantha Murrell	16 July 1997 (aged 19)			(New Zealand Football) Norwest United AFC
6	DF	Meikayla Moore	4 June 1996 (aged 20)			(New Zealand Football) Coastal Spirit FC
7	MF	Isabella Coombes	5 November 1997 (aged 19)			(New Zealand Football) Claudelands Rovers
8	FW	Jasmine Pereira	20 July 1996 (aged 20)			(New Zealand Football) Three Kings United
9	FW	Martine Puketapu	16 September 1997 (aged 19)			(New Zealand Football) Three Kings United
10	MF	Daisy Cleverley	30 April 1997 (aged 19)			(New Zealand Football) Forrest Hill Milford
11	FW	Emma Rolston	10 November 1996 (aged 19)			(New Zealand Football) Forrest Hill Milford
12	MF	Malia Steinmetz	18 January 1999 (aged 17)			(New Zealand Football) Forrest Hill Milford
13	FW	Paige Satchell	13 April 1998 (aged 18)			(New Zealand Football) Rotorua United
14	MF	Jade Parris	26 September 1997 (aged 19)			(New Zealand Football) Metro FC
15	FW	Hannah Blake	5 May 2000 (aged 16)			(New Zealand Football) Three Kings United
16	FW	Tayla Christensen	31 August 1997 (aged 19)			(New Zealand Football) Claudelands Rovers
17	DF	Eileish Hayes	2 June 1996 (aged 20)			(New Zealand Football) Claudelands Rovers FC
18	MF	Grace Jale	10 April 1999 (aged 17)			(New Zealand Football) Eastern Suburbs
19	FW	Jacqui Hand	19 February 1999 (aged 17)			(New Zealand Football) Eastern Suburbs
20	GK	Emily Couchman	13 July 1998 (aged 18)			(New Zealand Football) Forrest Hill Milford United
21	GK	Nadia Olla	7 February 2000 (aged 16)			(New Zealand Football) Norwest United

== Group D ==
=== Germany ===
Coach: (Germany) Maren Meinert

No.	Pos.	Player	Date of birth (age)	Caps	Goals	Club
1	GK	Carina Schlüter	8 November 1996 (aged 20)	3	0	(German Football Association) SC Sand
14	FW	Melanie Ott	13 April 1997 (aged 19)	0	0	(German Football Association) FSV Gütersloh 2009
4	DF	Joelle Wedemeyer	12 August 1996 (aged 20)	6	0	(German Football Association) VfL Wolfsburg
7	MF	Jasmin Sehan	16 June 1997 (aged 19)	4	0	(German Football Association) VfL Wolfsburg
8	MF	Jennifer Gaugigl	22 August 1996 (aged 20)	9	0	(German Football Association) SC Sand
15	MF	Dina Orschmann	8 January 1998 (aged 18)	1	0	(German Football Association) 1. FC Union Berlin
18	FW	Stefanie Sanders	12 June 1998 (aged 18)	4	0	(German Football Association) SV Werder Bremen
10	MF	Madeline Gier	28 April 1996 (aged 20)	3	1	(German Football Association) Borussia Mönchengladbach
6	MF	Rieke Dieckmann	16 August 1996 (aged 20)	15	1	(German Football Association) Bayer 04 Leverkusen
21	GK	Vanessa Fischer	18 April 1998 (aged 18)	0	0	(German Football Association) 1. FFC Turbine Potsdam
16	DF	Jana Feldkamp	15 March 1998 (aged 18)	1	0	(German Football Association) SGS Essen
2	DF	Anna Gerhardt	17 April 1998 (aged 18)	1	0	(German Football Association) FC Bayern Munich
11	FW	Dörthe Hoppius	22 May 1996 (aged 20)	0	0	(United States Soccer Federation) San Jose State Spartans
19	MF	Saskia Matheis	6 June 1997 (aged 19)	5	0	(German Football Association) 1. FFC Frankfurt
9	FW	Lea Schüller	12 November 1997 (aged 18)	3	1	(German Football Association) SGS Essen
17	DF	Pia-Sophie Wolter	13 November 1997 (aged 18)	4	0	(German Football Association) SV Werder Bremen
12	GK	Lena Pauels	2 February 1998 (aged 18)	3	0	(German Football Association) SV Werder Bremen
5	DF	Rebecca Knaak	23 June 1996 (aged 20)	12	2	(German Football Association) Bayer 04 Leverkusen
20	MF	Laura Freigang	1 February 1998 (aged 18)	5	1	(United States Soccer Federation) Penn State Nittany Lions
3	DF	Lina Hausicke	30 December 1997 (aged 18)	1	0	(German Football Association) FF USV Jena
13	DF	Isabella Hartig	12 August 1997 (aged 19)	5	0	(German Football Association) TSG 1899 Hoffenheim

=== Venezuela ===
Coach: (Venezuela) José Catoya

No.	Pos.	Player	Date of birth (age)	Caps	Goals	Club
1	GK	Oriana Palacios	28 November 1997 (aged 18)			(Venezuelan Football Federation) Universidad Central de Venezuela FC
2	DF	Rafanny Mendoza	5 November 1996 (aged 20)			(Venezuelan Football Federation) Sulmona FC
3	DF	Alexyar Cañas	5 December 1996 (aged 19)			(Venezuelan Football Federation) ACD Lara
4	DF	Neily Carrasquel	26 July 1997 (aged 19)			(Venezuelan Football Federation) Deportivo La Guaira
5	MF	Yenifer Giménez	3 May 1996 (aged 20)			(Venezuelan Football Federation) ACD Lara
6	DF	Michelle Romero	12 June 1997 (aged 19)			(Venezuelan Football Federation) ACD Lara
7	FW	Yosneidy Zambrano	16 May 1997 (aged 19)			(Venezuelan Football Federation) ACD Lara
8	MF	Tahicelis Marcano	12 April 1997 (aged 19)			(Venezuelan Football Federation) Deportivo Anzoátegui SC
9	FW	Idalys Pérez	20 July 1996 (aged 20)			(Venezuelan Football Federation) Atlético Nirgua
10	MF	Lourdes Moreno	25 January 1997 (aged 19)			(Venezuelan Football Federation) ACD Lara
11	FW	Gabriela García	2 April 1997 (aged 19)			(Venezuelan Football Federation) Estudiantes de Guárico FC
12	GK	Franyely Rodríguez	21 September 1997 (aged 19)			(Venezuelan Football Federation) Carabobo FC
13	GK	Nayluisa Cáceres	18 November 1999 (aged 16)			(Venezuelan Football Federation) Zamora FC
14	MF	Hilaris Villasana	9 July 1998 (aged 18)			(Venezuelan Football Federation) Deportivo Anzoátegui SC
15	DF	Gerardine Olivo	20 August 1998 (aged 18)			(Venezuelan Football Federation) FUCEVA
16	FW	Vimarest Díaz	16 November 1996 (aged 19)			(Venezuelan Football Federation) Universidad Central de Venezuela FC
17	MF	Yorgelis Pineda	30 January 1997 (aged 19)			(Venezuelan Football Federation) FC Independiente La Fría
18	FW	Mariana Speckmaier	26 December 1997 (aged 18)			(United States Soccer Federation) Clemson Tigers
19	FW	Yailyn Medina	27 January 1998 (aged 18)			(Venezuelan Football Federation) FC Independiente La Fría
20	MF	Daniuska Rodríguez	4 January 1999 (aged 17)			(Venezuelan Football Federation) AFF San Diego
21	MF	Tonny Pereira	21 July 1997 (aged 19)			(Venezuelan Football Federation) Universidad Central de Venezuela FC

=== Mexico ===
Coach: (Mexico) Roberto Medina

No.	Pos.	Player	Date of birth (age)	Caps	Goals	Club
1	GK	Emily Alvarado	9 June 1998 (aged 18)			(United States Soccer Federation) Texas Rush
2	DF	Jaqueline Rodríguez	7 September 1996 (aged 20)			(Mexican Football Federation) UDLA Puebla
3	MF	Vanessa Flores	26 May 1997 (aged 19)			(United States Soccer Federation) Albion Hurricanes FC
4	DF	Rebeca Bernal	31 August 1997 (aged 19)			(Mexican Football Federation) ITESM Monterrey
5	DF	Monica Flores	31 January 1996 (aged 20)			(United States Soccer Federation) Notre Dame Fighting Irish
6	MF	Nancy Antonio	20 August 1999 (aged 17)			(Mexican Football Federation) Universidad Anahuac Campus Sur
7	DF	Liliana Rodríguez	27 February 1996 (aged 20)			(Mexican Football Federation) Lioness FC
8	MF	Evelyn González	5 December 1996 (aged 19)			(Mexican Football Federation) Universidad de Monterrey
9	FW	Kiana Palacios	1 October 1996 (aged 20)			(United States Soccer Federation) UC Irvine Anteaters
10	MF	Eva González	30 April 1997 (aged 19)			(United States Soccer Federation) Seton Hall Pirates
11	MF	María Sánchez	20 February 1996 (aged 20)			(United States Soccer Federation) Idaho State Bengals
12	GK	Esthefanny Barreras	2 November 1996 (aged 20)			(United States Soccer Federation) Eastern Florida State College
13	DF	Annia Mejia	12 March 1996 (aged 20)			(United States Soccer Federation) California Golden Bears
14	DF	Paulina Solís	13 March 1996 (aged 20)			(Mexican Football Federation) Centro de Formación de Guadalajara
15	MF	Natalia Villareal	19 March 1998 (aged 18)			(Mexican Football Federation) Universidad de Monterrey
16	DF	Miriam Garcia	14 February 1998 (aged 18)			(Mexican Football Federation) Centro de Formación Guadalajara
17	FW	Jacqueline Crowther	10 August 1997 (aged 19)			(United States Soccer Federation) Baylor Lady Bears
18	MF	Belén Cruz	7 November 1998 (aged 18)			(Mexican Football Federation) Tigres de Acapulco
19	FW	Blanca Solís	30 April 1996 (aged 20)			(Mexican Football Federation) Guerreras de Chiapas
20	FW	Katty Martínez	14 March 1998 (aged 18)			(Mexican Football Federation) Universidad de Monterrey
21	GK	Ángeles Martínez	18 February 1996 (aged 20)			(Mexican Football Federation) Tigres UANL

=== South Korea ===
Coach: (South Korea) Jong Song-chon

No.	Pos.	Player	Date of birth (age)	Caps	Goals	Club
1	GK	Kim Min-jung	12 September 1996 (aged 20)			(Korea Football Association) Daeduk College
2	DF	Choi Su-jung	28 January 1997 (aged 19)			(Korea Football Association) Ulsan College
3	DF	Kim Hye-in	7 February 1997 (aged 19)			(Korea Football Association) Uiduk University
4	DF	Lee Hyo-kyeong	12 February 1997 (aged 19)			(Japan Football Association) Hokuriku University
5	DF	Hong Hye-ji	25 August 1996 (aged 20)	9	0	(Korea Football Association) Korea University
6	DF	Meang Da-hee	8 April 1997 (aged 19)			(Korea Football Association) Ulsan College
7	FW	Namgung Ye-ji	17 April 1996 (aged 20)	4	3	(Korea Football Association) Korea University
8	MF	Park Ye-eun	17 October 1996 (aged 20)	7	0	(Korea Football Association) Korea University
9	FW	Choi Hee-jeong	8 March 1996 (aged 20)			(Korea Football Association) Gangwon State University
10	FW	Jang Chang	21 June 1996 (aged 20)			(Korea Football Association) Korea University
11	MF	Sim Seo-hui	17 December 1998 (aged 17)			(Korea Football Association) Dongsan Information Industry HS
12	MF	Song Ji-yoon	16 June 1997 (aged 19)			(Korea Football Association) Korea University
13	MF	Han Chae-rin	2 September 1996 (aged 20)			(Korea Football Association) Uiduk University
14	FW	Kim So-eun	20 September 1998 (aged 18)			(Korea Football Association) Chungju Yesung Girls HS
15	FW	Kim Seong-mi	2 April 1997 (aged 19)			(Korea Football Association) Ulsan College
16	MF	Ko Yoo-jin	24 January 1997 (aged 19)			(Korea Football Association) Korea University
17	DF	Yoon Sun-young	1 September 1997 (aged 19)			(Korea Football Association) Sejong FMC
18	GK	Kim Do-hyun	19 June 1997 (aged 19)			(Korea Football Association) Ulsan College
19	MF	Kim So-hee	17 November 1997 (aged 18)			(Korea Football Association) Sejong FMC
20	DF	Lee A-in	9 April 1996 (aged 20)			(Korea Football Association) Korea University
21	GK	Kwon Hae-in	9 November 1998 (aged 17)			(Korea Football Association) Chungju Yesung Girls HS
