= 2015 UEFA Women's Under-19 Championship =

אליפות אירופה בכדורגל נשים עד גיל 19 - 2015

Tournament details
- Host country: Israel
- Dates: 15–27 July
- Teams: 8 (from 1 confederation)
- Venues: 4 (in 4 host cities)

Final positions
- Champions: Sweden (3rd title)
- Runners-up: Spain

Tournament statistics
- Matches played: 15
- Goals scored: 39 (2.6 per match)
- Attendance: 18,603 (1,240 per match)
- Top scorer: (Sweden) Stina Blackstenius (6 goals)
- Best player: (Sweden) Stina Blackstenius

The 2015 UEFA Women's Under-19 Championship was the 14th edition of the UEFA Women's Under-19 Championship (18th edition if the Under-18 era is included), the annual European youth football competition contested by the women's under-19 national teams of the member associations of UEFA. Israel hosted the tournament. Players born on or after 1 January 1996 were eligible to participate in this competition.

Same as previous editions held in odd-numbered years, the tournament acted as the UEFA qualifiers for the FIFA U-20 Women's World Cup. The four semi-finalists qualified for the 2016 FIFA U-20 Women's World Cup in Papua New Guinea as the UEFA representatives.

== Qualification ==
A total of 48 UEFA nations entered the competition, and with the hosts Israel qualifying automatically, the other 47 teams competed in the qualifying competition to determine the remaining seven spots in the final tournament. The qualifying competition consisted of two rounds: Qualifying round, which took place in autumn 2014, and Elite round, which took place in spring 2015.

=== Qualified teams ===
The following eight teams qualified for the final tournament.

Note: All appearance statistics include only U-19 era (since 2002).

Team	Method of qualification	Finals appearance	Last appearance	Previous best performance
Israel	Hosts	1st	Debut	Debut
Spain	Elite round Group 1 winners	10th	2014	Champions (2004)
Sweden	Elite round Group 2 winners	9th	2014	Champions (2012)
France	Elite round Group 3 winners	11th	2013	Champions (2003, 2010, 2013)
England	Elite round Group 4 winners	11th	2014	Champions (2009)
Norway	Elite round Group 4 runners-up	10th	2014	Runners-up (2003, 2008, 2011)
Germany	Elite round Group 5 winners	12th	2013	Champions (2002, 2006, 2007, 2011)
Denmark	Elite round Group 6 winners	6th	2013	Semi-finals (2002, 2006, 2012)

Notes

1. The best runners-up among all six elite round groups qualified for the final tournament.

=== Final draw ===
The final draw was held in Haifa, Israel on 20 May 2015, 20:15 IDT (UTC+3). The eight teams were drawn into two groups of four teams. There were no seeding except that the hosts Israel were assigned to position A1 in the draw.

== Venues ==
The matches were played at four venues in four host cities.

Netanya	2015 UEFA Women's Under-19 Championship is located in Israel	Rishon LeZion
Netanya Stadium	2015 UEFA Women's Under-19 Championship is located in Israel	Haberfeld Stadium
Capacity: 13,610	2015 UEFA Women's Under-19 Championship is located in Israel	Capacity: 6,000
Lod	2015 UEFA Women's Under-19 Championship is located in Israel	Ramla
Lod Municipal Stadium	2015 UEFA Women's Under-19 Championship is located in Israel	Ramla Municipal Stadium
Capacity: 3,000	2015 UEFA Women's Under-19 Championship is located in Israel	Capacity: 2,000

== Squads ==
Each national team had to submit a squad of 18 players.

=== Sweden ===
- Head coach: Calle Barrling
- Goalkeepers: Matilda Haglund (Lidköpings FK), Emma Holmgren (IK Sirius)
- Defenders: Ronja Aronsson (Piteå IF), Lotta Ökvist (Piteå IF), Nathalie Björn (AIK), Emelie Andersson (QBIK), Julia Ekholm (Bollstanäs SK)
- Midfielders: Filippa Angeldahl (AIK), Anna Oskarsson (Hammarby IF), Tove Almqvist (Linköpings FC), Michelle De Jongh (KIF Örebro DFF), Maja Göthberg (Hovås Billdal IF), Emma Jansson (Hammarby IF), Ellen Löfqvist (Sundsvalls DFF)
- Forwards: Julia Zigiotti Olme (AIK), Stina Blackstenius (Linköpings FC), Rebecka Blomqvist (Kopparbergs/Göteborg FC), Linda Hallin (KIF Örebro DFF)

== Match officials ==
A total of 6 referees, 8 assistant referees and 2 fourth officials were appointed for the final tournament.

Referees

- Esther Azzopardi (Malta)
- Lorraine Clark (Scotland)
- (Republic of Ireland) Rhona Daly (Republic of Ireland)
- Eleni Lampadariou (Greece)
- Lina Lehtovaara (Finland)
- Ana Minić (Serbia)

Assistant referees

- (North Macedonia) Biljana Atanasovski Milanova (Macedonia)
- Stephanie Forde (Belgium)
- Fijke Hoogendijk (Netherlands)
- Biljana Iskin (Austria)
- Susanne Küng (Switzerland)
- Mihaela Ţepuşă Gomoescu (Romania)
- Katalin Török (Hungary)
- Diana Vanaga (Latvia)

Fourth officials

- Vesna Budimir (Croatia)
- Tania Fernandes Morais (Luxembourg)

== Group stage ==
Group winners and runners-up advanced to the semi-finals and qualified for the 2016 FIFA U-20 Women's World Cup.

Tiebreakers

if two or more teams were equal on points on completion of the group matches, the following tie-breaking criteria were applied, in the order given, to determine the rankings:

1. Higher number of points obtained in the group matches played among the teams in question;
2. Superior goal difference resulting from the group matches played among the teams in question;
3. Higher number of goals scored in the group matches played among the teams in question;
4. If, after having applied criteria 1 to 3, teams still had an equal ranking, criteria 1 to 3 were reapplied exclusively to the group matches between the teams in question to determine their final rankings. If this procedure did not lead to a decision, criteria 5 to 9 applied;
5. Superior goal difference in all group matches;
6. Higher number of goals scored in all group matches;
7. If only two teams had the same number of points, and they were tied according to criteria 1 to 6 after having met in the last round of the group stage, their rankings were determined by a penalty shoot-out (not used if more than two teams had the same number of points, or if their rankings were not relevant for qualification for the next stage).
8. Lower disciplinary points total based only on yellow and red cards received in the group matches (red card = 3 points, yellow card = 1 point, expulsion for two yellow cards in one match = 3 points);
9. Drawing of lots.

All times were local, IDT (UTC+3).

=== Group A ===
Pos	Team	Pld	W	D	L	GF	GA	GD	Pts	Qualification
1	France	3	3	0	0	6	0	+6	9	Advance to knockout stage 2016 FIFA U-20 Women's World Cup
2	Sweden	3	2	0	1	4	1	+3	6	Advance to knockout stage 2016 FIFA U-20 Women's World Cup
3	Denmark	3	1	0	2	2	3	−1	3	
4	Israel (H)	3	0	0	3	1	9	−8	0	

Source: UEFA
(H) Hosts
15 July 2015
19:30

France	1–0	Denmark
Léger 49'	Report

Netanya Stadium, Netanya
Attendance: 400
Referee: Ana Minić (Serbia)
15 July 2015
20:10

Israel	0–3	Sweden
	Report	Björn 22'; Blackstenius 28', 72'

Lod Municipal Stadium, Lod
Attendance: 2,500
Referee: Rhona Daly (Republic of Ireland)

18 July 2015
19:30

Sweden	1–0	Denmark
Angeldal 35' (pen.)	Report

Haberfeld Stadium, Rishon LeZion
Attendance: 250
Referee: Lorraine Clark (Scotland)
18 July 2015
21:15

Israel	0–4	France
	Report	Matéo 10'; Carage 26'; Gathrat 63'; Léger 90'

Netanya Stadium, Netanya
Attendance: 2,630
Referee: Lina Lehtovaara (Finland)

21 July 2015
19:40

Denmark	2–1	Israel
Sørensen 33', 60'	Report	Avital 22'

Lod Municipal Stadium, Lod
Attendance: 2,300
Referee: Eleni Lampadariou (Greece)
21 July 2015
19:40

Sweden	0–1	France
	Report	Andersson 5' (o.g.)

Netanya Stadium, Netanya
Attendance: 600
Referee: Rhona Daly (Republic of Ireland)

=== Group B ===
Pos	Team	Pld	W	D	L	GF	GA	GD	Pts	Qualification
1	Germany	3	2	0	1	3	3	0	6 (Note: Ranked by head-to-head result (Germany 1–0 Spain))	Advance to knockout stage 2016 FIFA U-20 Women's World Cup
2	Spain	3	2	0	1	7	2	+5	6	Advance to knockout stage 2016 FIFA U-20 Women's World Cup
3	Norway	3	1	1	1	2	4	−2	4	
4	England	3	0	1	2	2	5	−3	1	

Source: UEFA
Notes:
15 July 2015
19:30

England	1–2	Germany
George 30'	Report	Ehegötz 25'; Knaak 87'

Haberfeld Stadium, Rishon LeZion
Attendance: 300
Referee: Lina Lehtovaara (Finland)
15 July 2015
19:30

Spain	4–0	Norway
Redondo 22', 83'; Nahikari 26'; Garrote 38'	Report

Ramla Municipal Stadium, Ramla
Attendance: 180
Referee: Esther Azzopardi (Malta)

18 July 2015
19:30

England	1–3	Spain
Flint 9'	Report	Garrote 54'; Redondo 82'; Gálvez 90'

Ramla Municipal Stadium, Ramla
Attendance: 300
Referee: Eleni Lampadariou (Greece)
18 July 2015
19:30

Germany	0–2	Norway
	Report	Fjelldal 5'; Knaak 33' (o.g.)

Lod Municipal Stadium, Lod
Attendance: 200
Referee: Ana Minić (Serbia)

21 July 2015
19:30

Norway	0–0	England
	Report

Ramla Municipal Stadium, Ramla
Attendance: 200
Referee: Esther Azzopardi (Malta)
21 July 2015
19:30

Germany	1–0	Spain
Gálvez 39' (o.g.)	Report

Haberfeld Stadium, Rishon LeZion
Attendance: 400
Referee: Lorraine Clark (Scotland)

== Knockout stage ==
In the knockout stage, extra time and penalty shoot-out were used to decide the winner if necessary.

=== Bracket ===
Semi-finals
24 July – Lod
France	1 (4)
Spain (p)	1 (5)
24 July – Netanya
Germany	3 (2)
Sweden (p)	3 (4)

Final
27 July – Netanya
Spain	1
Sweden	3

=== Semi-finals ===
24 July 2015
19:00

Germany	3–3 (a.e.t.)	Sweden
Knaak 12'; Ehegötz 58'; Gier 78'	Report	Almqvist 21'; Blackstenius 44', 88'
Penalties
Knaak (penalty scored); Gier (penalty missed); Rauch (penalty missed); Gaugigl (penalty scored)	2–4	(penalty scored) Angeldal; (penalty scored) Björn; (penalty scored) Blackstenius; (penalty scored) Blomqvist

Netanya Stadium, Netanya
Attendance: 680
Referee: Esther Azzopardi (Malta)

24 July 2015
21:30

France	1–1 (a.e.t.)	Spain
Léger 36'	Report	Falcón 42'
Penalties
Greboval (penalty scored); Lahmari (penalty scored); Karchaoui (penalty scored); Romanelli (penalty scored); Léger (penalty missed)	4–5	(penalty scored) Domínguez; (penalty scored) Hernández; (penalty scored) Ortega; (penalty scored) Beltrán; (penalty scored) García

Lod Municipal Stadium, Lod
Attendance: 433
Referee: Rhona Daly (Republic of Ireland)

=== Final ===
27 July 2015
19:40

Spain	1–3	Sweden
Hernández 81'	Report	Blackstenius 28', 36'; Angeldal 89'

Netanya Stadium, Netanya
Attendance: 7,230
Referee: Lina Lehtovaara (Finland)

== Goalscorers ==
6 goals

- (Sweden) Stina Blackstenius

3 goals

- (France) Marie-Charlotte Léger
- (Spain) Alba Redondo

2 goals

- (Denmark) Nicoline Sørensen
- (Germany) Nina Ehegötz
- (Germany) Rebecca Knaak
- (Spain) Pilar Garrote
- (Sweden) Filippa Angeldal

1 goal

- (England) Natasha Flint
- (England) Gabrielle George
- (France) Noémie Carage
- (France) Juliane Gathrat
- (France) Clara Matéo
- (Germany) Madeline Gier
- (Israel) Eden Avital
- (Norway) Vilde Fjelldal
- (Spain) Rocío Gálvez
- (Spain) Nahikari García
- (Spain) Sandra Hernández
- (Spain) Andrea Falcón
- (Sweden) Tove Almqvist
- (Sweden) Nathalie Björn

Own goals

- (Germany) Rebecca Knaak (playing against Norway)
- (Spain) Rocío Gálvez (playing against Germany)
- (Sweden) Emelie Andersson (playing against France)

Source: UEFA.com

== Team of the tournament ==
Goalkeepers

- (Germany) Lena Pauels
- (England) Caitlin Leach

Defenders

- (France) Théa Greboval
- (Germany) Rebecca Knaak
- (France) Pauline Dhaeyer
- (Spain) Rocío Gálvez
- (Germany) Felicitas Rauch
- (Sweden) Nathalie Björn

Midfielders

- (England) Jodie Brett
- (Spain) Pilar Garrote
- (France) Juliane Gathrat
- (France) Maëlle Garbino
- (Spain) Sandra Hernández

Forwards

- (Sweden) Stina Blackstenius
- (Sweden) Tove Almqvist
- (Spain) Nahikari García
- (Israel) Eden Avital
- (Germany) Madeline Gier

Source: UEFA.com

Golden player: (Sweden) Stina Blackstenius

== Qualified teams for FIFA U-20 Women's World Cup ==
The following four teams from UEFA qualified for the FIFA U-20 Women's World Cup.

Team	Qualified on	Previous appearances in tournament^{1}
Sweden	18 July 2015	1 (2010)
Spain	21 July 2015	1 (2004)
France	18 July 2015	5 (2002, 2006, 2008, 2010, 2014)
Germany	21 July 2015	7 (2002, **2004**, 2006, 2008, **2010**, 2012, **2014**)

^{1} Bold indicates champion for that year. Italic indicates host for that year.
