= Göthberg =

Göthberg is a surname. Notable people with the surname include:

- Anders Göthberg (1975–2008), Swedish guitarist
- Maja Göthberg (born 1997), Swedish footballer
- Zane Gothberg (born 1992), American ice hockey goaltender
