= Michelle De Jongh =

Swedish footballer

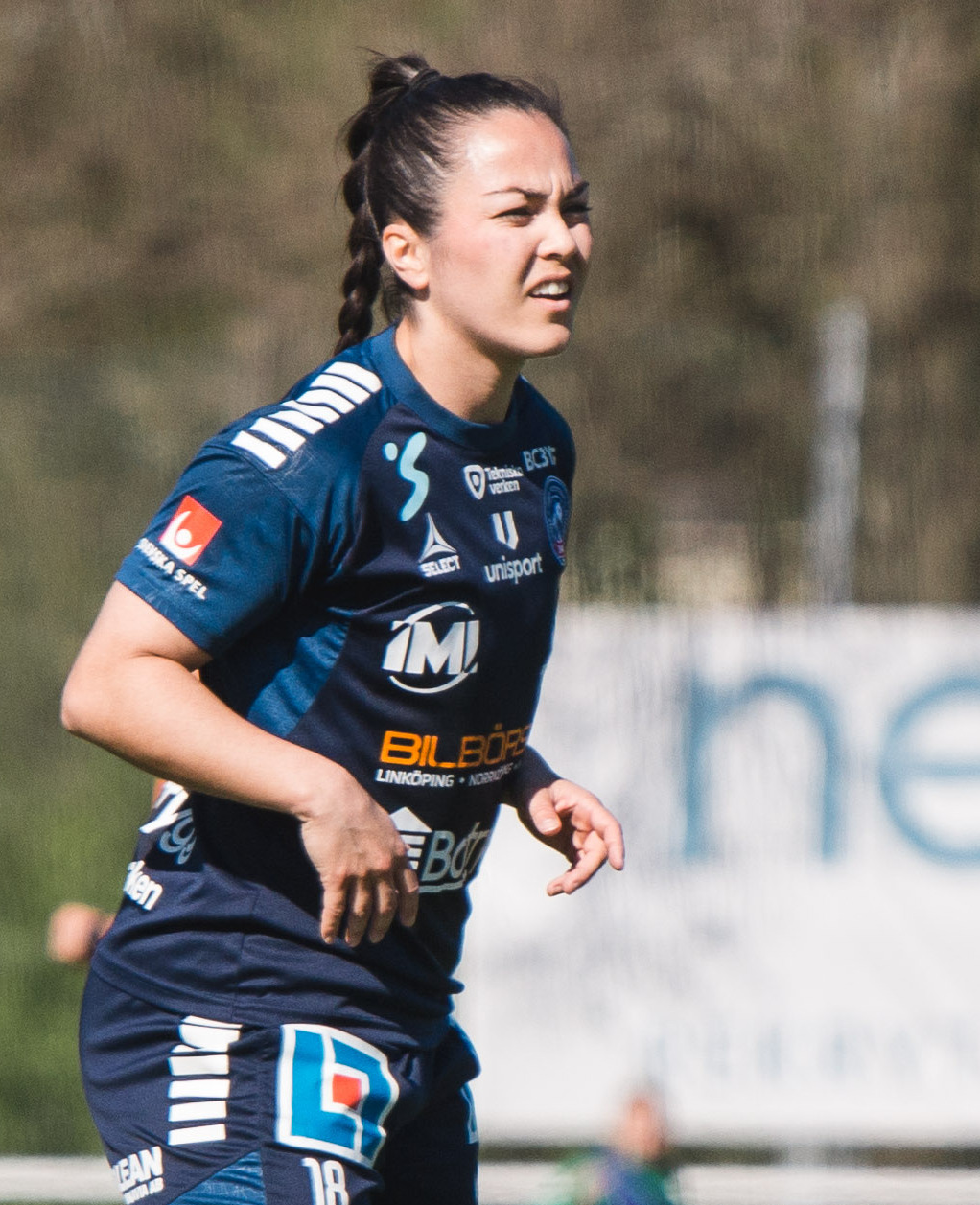
- De Jongh with Linköpings FC in 2025

Personal information
- Full name: Michelle Helene Isabelle De Jongh
- Date of birth: 19 May 1997 (age 29)
- Place of birth: Sweden
- Height: 1.61 m (5 ft 3 in)
- Position: Midfielder

Team information
- Current team: Linköpings FC
- Number: 18

Senior career*
Years	Team	Apps	(Gls)
2013	Mariestads BoIS FF		
2014–2017	KIF Örebro DFF	70	(9)
2018–2021	Vittsjö GIK	66	(19)
2021	FC Fleury 91 (loan)	10	(1)
2022	Madrid CFF	8	(0)
2022–2025	Linköpings FC	37	(5)

International career^{‡}
2012	Sweden U17	2	(0)
2015	Sweden U19	8	(0)
- * Club domestic league appearances and goals as of 01:15, 24 January 2021 (UTC) ‡ National team caps and goals as of 09:30, 21 May 2016 (UTC)

Michelle Helene Isabelle De Jongh (born 19 May 1997) is a Swedish professional footballer who last played as a midfielder for Linköpings FC.

== Honours ==
=== Club ===
KIF Örebro DFF

Runner-up

- Damallsvenskan: 2014

=== International ===
Sweden U19

Winner

- UEFA Women's Under-19 Championship: 2015
