= Emelie Andersson =

Swedish footballer (born 1996)

Personal information
- Date of birth: 13 September 1996 (age 30)
- Position: Defender

Senior career*
Years	Team	Apps	(Gls)
2013–2015	QBIK		
2016	Mallbackens IF	10	(0)
2017–2018	KIF Orebro	23	(0)

International career
2014–2015	Sweden U19		
- * Club domestic league appearances and goals

Marie Emelie Andersson (born 13 September 1996) is a Swedish footballer who played as a defender for KIF Örebro DFF in the Damallsvenskan.

Andersson's motherclub is IFK Skoghall. At the age of fourteen she started playing for QBIK team. In the 2015 season she was named team captain. Between 2013 and 2015, she played a total of 47 matches and made 10 goals in Elitettan.

For the 2016 season Andersson started playing for Mallbackens IF in the highest league Damallsvenskan. In April 2016, she suffered from myocarditis, but came back in time to play ten matches for the club.

In November 2016, Andersson started playing for KIF Örebro after signing a two-year contract with the club.
