= 2016 FIFA U-20 Women's World Cup =

8th edition of the FIFA U-20 Women's World Cup

2016 FIFA U-20 Women’s World Cup

Tournament details
- Host country: Papua New Guinea
- Dates: 13 November – 3 December
- Teams: 16 (from 6 confederations)
- Venues: 4 (in 1 host city)

Final positions
- Champions: North Korea (2nd title)
- Runners-up: France
- Third place: Japan
- Fourth place: United States

Tournament statistics
- Matches played: 32
- Goals scored: 113 (3.53 per match)
- Attendance: 159,099 (4,972 per match)
- Top scorer(s): (Brazil) Gabi Nunes (Japan) Mami Ueno (Sweden) Stina Blackstenius (5 goals each)
- Best player: (Japan) Hina Sugita
- Best goalkeeper: (France) Mylène Chavas
- Fair play award: Japan

The 2016 FIFA U-20 Women's World Cup was the 8th edition of the FIFA U-20 Women's World Cup, the biennial international women's youth football championship contested by the under-20 national teams of the member associations of FIFA. The tournament was held in Papua New Guinea from 13 November to 3 December 2016. This was the first FIFA tournament held in the country, the first FIFA tournament held in Melanesia, and the first FIFA association football tournament in Oceania to take place outside Australasia (i.e. Australia and New Zealand).

North Korea won their second title by beating France 3–1 in the final. They became the first country to win both of the age-group Women's World Cups in the same year, with their under-17 team winning the U-17 Women's World Cup earlier that year.

== Host selection ==
=== Original round of bidding ===
The following countries submitted bids to host the tournament by the May 2013 deadline:

- Norway
- Republic of Ireland
- South Africa

South Africa were awarded the hosting rights by FIFA Executive Committee at their meeting on 5 December 2013. However, they later withdrew, giving its notice at FIFA's executive committee meeting prior to the 2014 FIFA World Cup.

=== Second round of bidding ===
After South Africa's withdrawal, the following countries announced they would be interested in hosting:

- Papua New Guinea
- Sweden

Papua New Guinea were awarded the hosting rights of the tournament by the FIFA Executive Committee on 20 March 2015.

== Qualified teams ==
A total of 16 teams qualify for the final tournament. In addition to Papua New Guinea who qualified automatically as hosts, the other 15 teams qualify from six separate continental competitions. The slot allocation was published in June 2014.

Confederation	Qualifying Tournament	Qualifier(s)
AFC (Asia)	2015 AFC U-19 Women's Championship	Japan; North Korea; South Korea
CAF (Africa)	2015 African U-20 Women's World Cup Qualifying Tournament	Ghana; Nigeria
CONCACAF (North, Central America & Caribbean)	2015 CONCACAF Women's U-20 Championship	Canada; Mexico; United States
CONMEBOL (South America)	2015 South American Under-20 Women's Championship	Brazil; Venezuela^{1}
OFC (Oceania)	Host nation	Papua New Guinea^{1}
OFC (Oceania)	2015 OFC U-20 Women's Championship	New Zealand
UEFA (Europe)	2015 UEFA Women's Under-19 Championship	France; Germany; Spain; Sweden

1.Teams that made their debut.

== Venues ==
A FIFA delegation visited the following four stadiums in April 2015: Sir Hubert Murray Stadium, Sir John Guise Stadium, Lloyd Robson Oval (National Football Stadium), and Bava Park, all located in Port Moresby. The same four stadiums were submitted to FIFA for approval in October 2015. The final approved stadiums are:

Port Moresby
Sir John Guise Stadium	National Football Stadium	PNG Football Stadium	Bava Park
Capacity: 15,000	Capacity: 14,800	Capacity: 5,000	Capacity: 5,000
2016 FIFA U-20 Women's World Cup is located in Papua New Guinea

== Emblem and slogan ==
The official emblem and slogan ("To Inspire, To Excel") were unveiled on 8 March 2016.

== Mascot ==
The official mascot, a bird-of-paradise nicknamed "Susa", was launched on 11 June 2016.

== Theme Song ==
The official theme song for the 2016 FIFA U-20 Women's World cup Kumul Susa written by dAdiigii and performed by Mereani & dAdiigii.

== Squads ==
Each team must name a squad of 21 players (three of whom must be goalkeepers) by the FIFA deadline. All players must be born on or after 1 January 1996, and on or before 31 December 2000. The official squads were announced on 8 November 2016.

== Match officials ==
A total of 16 referees, and 27 assistant referees were appointed by FIFA for the tournament.

Confederation	Referees	Assistant referees
AFC	(Myanmar) Aye Thein (China) Qin Liang (Australia) Casey Reibelt	(China) Bao Mengxiao (China) Fang Yan (Australia) Sarah Ho (South Korea) Kim Kyoung-min
CAF	(Cameroon) Thérèse Neguel (Senegal) Fatou Thioune	(Egypt) Mona Mahmoud (Benin) Tempa Ndah
CONCACAF	(Mexico) Quetzalli Alvarado (Costa Rica) Marianela Araya Cruz (Honduras) Melissa Borjas (Canada) Michelle Pye	(El Salvador) Elizabeth Aguilar (El Salvador) Emperatriz Ayala (Canada) Chantal Boudreau (Mexico) Lixy Enríquez (Costa Rica) Kimberly Moreira (Honduras) Shirley Perello
CONMEBOL	(Venezuela) Yercinia Correa (Peru) Silvia Reyes	(Ecuador) Mónica Amboya (Uruguay) Mariana Corbo (Venezuela) Yoly García (Ecuador) Viviana Segura
OFC	(Fiji) Finau Vulivuli	(Samoa) Maria Tamalelagi
UEFA	(Czech Republic) Jana Adámková (Germany) Riem Hussein (Hungary) Katalin Kulcsár (Poland) Monika Mularczyk (Sweden) Sara Persson	(North Macedonia) Biljana Atanasovski (France) Solenne Bartnik (Serbia) Svetlana Bilić (Switzerland) Belinda Brem (Cyprus) Angela Kyriakou (Sweden) Julia Magnusson (Republic of Ireland) Michelle O'Neill (Ukraine) Maryna Striletska (Romania) Elena Țepușă (Hungary) Katalin Török

== Draw ==
The official draw was held on 17 March 2016, 18:30 CET (UTC+1), at the FIFA headquarters in Zürich, Switzerland. The teams were seeded based on their performances in previous U-20 Women's World Cups and confederation tournaments, with the hosts Papua New Guinea automatically seeded and assigned to position A1. Teams of the same confederation could not meet in the group stage.

Pot 1	Pot 2	Pot 3	Pot 4
Papua New Guinea; Germany; United States; Nigeria	North Korea; Japan; France; South Korea	New Zealand; Brazil; Mexico; Canada	Ghana; Sweden; Spain; Venezuela

== Group stage ==
The top two teams of each group advance to the quarter-finals. The rankings of teams in each group are determined as follows:

1. points obtained in all group matches;
2. goal difference in all group matches;
3. number of goals scored in all group matches;

If two or more teams are equal on the basis of the above three criteria, their rankings are determined as follows:

4. points obtained in the group matches between the teams concerned;
5. goal difference in the group matches between the teams concerned;
6. number of goals scored in the group matches between the teams concerned;
7. fair play points
  - first yellow card: minus 1 point;
  - indirect red card (second yellow card): minus 3 points;
  - direct red card: minus 4 points;
  - yellow card and direct red card: minus 5 points;
8. drawing of lots by the FIFA Organising Committee.

All times are local, PGT (UTC+10).

=== Group A ===
Pos	Team	Pld	W	D	L	GF	GA	GD	Pts	Qualification
1	North Korea	3	3	0	0	13	3	+10	9	Knockout stage
2	Brazil	3	1	1	1	12	5	+7	4	Knockout stage
3	Sweden	3	1	1	1	7	3	+4	4	
4	Papua New Guinea (H)	3	0	0	3	1	22	−21	0	

Source: FIFA
(H) Hosts
13 November 2016
16:00

Sweden	0–2	North Korea
	Report	Ri Hyang-sim 25'; Kim So-hyang 48'

Sir John Guise Stadium, Port Moresby
Attendance: 4,944
Referee: Melissa Borjas (Honduras)
13 November 2016
19:00

Papua New Guinea	0–9	Brazil
	Report	Duda 6'; Gabi Nunes 11', 70'; Brena 17', 24' (pen.); Yasmim 45+1', 66'; Katrine 45+3'; Geyse 49'

Sir John Guise Stadium, Port Moresby
Attendance: 12,547
Referee: Katalin Kulcsár (Hungary)

16 November 2016
16:00

North Korea	4–2	Brazil
U Sol-gyong 20'; Ri Hyang-sim 35'; Carla 40' (o.g.); Jon So-yon 45+6' (pen.)	Report	Gabi Nunes 29'; Brena 51' (pen.)

Sir John Guise Stadium, Port Moresby
Attendance: 3,906
Referee: Riem Hussein (Germany)
16 November 2016
19:00

Papua New Guinea	0–6	Sweden
	Report	Blackstenius 8', 43', 58', 72'; Kaneryd 75'; Anvegård 82'

Sir John Guise Stadium, Port Moresby
Attendance: 9,123
Referee: Aye Thein (Myanmar)

20 November 2016
19:00

North Korea	7–1	Papua New Guinea
Ri Un-sim 7'; Kim So-hyang 37', 45+4', 53'; Ju Hyo-sim 45+3'; Wi Jong-sim 65'; Sung Hyang-sim 90+1'	Report	Ageva 16'

National Football Stadium, Port Moresby
Attendance: 9,231
Referee: Yercinia Correa (Venezuela)
20 November 2016
19:00

Brazil	1–1	Sweden
Gabi Nunes 31'	Report	Blackstenius 14'

PNG Football Stadium, Port Moresby
Attendance: 3,553
Referee: Qin Liang (China)

=== Group B ===
Pos	Team	Pld	W	D	L	GF	GA	GD	Pts	Qualification
1	Japan	3	2	0	1	11	1	+10	6	Knockout stage
2	Spain	3	2	0	1	7	2	+5	6	Knockout stage
3	Nigeria	3	2	0	1	5	8	−3	6	
4	Canada	3	0	0	3	1	13	−12	0	

Source: FIFA
13 November 2016
16:00

Spain	5–0	Canada
Caldentey 2'; L. García 30', 90+5'; Bonmatí 58'; Guijarro 87'	Report

Bava Park, Port Moresby
Attendance: 1,187
Referee: Qin Liang (China)
13 November 2016
19:00

Japan	6–0	Nigeria
Momiki 34', 51', 56'; Ueno 37', 62', 82'	Report

Bava Park, Port Moresby
Attendance: 1,651
Referee: Quetzalli Alvarado (Mexico)

16 November 2016
16:00

Spain	1–0	Japan
Caldentey 81' (pen.)	Report

Bava Park, Port Moresby
Attendance: 858
Referee: Marianela Araya Cruz (Costa Rica)
16 November 2016
19:00

Nigeria	3–1	Canada
Uchendu 45+1' (pen.); Bokiri 46'; Ihezuo 73'	Report	Carle 15'

Bava Park, Port Moresby
Attendance: 1,748
Referee: Sara Persson (Sweden)

20 November 2016
16:00

Nigeria	2–1	Spain
Onyebuchi 12'; Ihezuo 72'	Report	Redondo 7'

PNG Football Stadium, Port Moresby
Attendance: 2,032
Referee: Melissa Borjas (Honduras)
20 November 2016
16:00

Canada	0–5	Japan
	Report	Hasegawa 26', 51'; Ueno 42'; Hayashi 47'; Sugita 73'

National Football Stadium, Port Moresby
Attendance: 5,449
Referee: Fatou Thioune (Senegal)

=== Group C ===
Pos	Team	Pld	W	D	L	GF	GA	GD	Pts	Qualification
1	United States	3	1	2	0	4	2	+2	5 (Note: United States finished ahead of France based on fair play points.)	Knockout stage
2	France	3	1	2	0	4	2	+2	5	Knockout stage
3	New Zealand	3	1	0	2	2	5	−3	3	
4	Ghana	3	0	2	1	3	4	−1	2	

Source: FIFA
Notes:
14 November 2016
16:00

France	0–0	United States
	Report

PNG Football Stadium, Port Moresby
Attendance: 2,033
Referee: Casey Reibelt (Australia)
14 November 2016
19:00

Ghana	0–1	New Zealand
	Report	Christensen 89'

PNG Football Stadium, Port Moresby
Attendance: 2,877
Referee: Monika Mularczyk (Poland)

17 November 2016
16:00

France	2–2	Ghana
D. Cascarino 30'; Matéo 90+5'	Report	Owusu-Ansah 44'; Ayieyam 65'

PNG Football Stadium, Port Moresby
Attendance: 808
Referee: Quetzalli Alvarado (Mexico)
17 November 2016
19:00

New Zealand	1–3	United States
Coombes 76'	Report	Sanchez 3'; Pugh 8'; Watt 82'

PNG Football Stadium, Port Moresby
Attendance: 2,399
Referee: Thérèse Neguel (Cameroon)

21 November 2016
16:00

New Zealand	0–2	France
	Report	Léger 17'; Matéo 47'

Bava Park, Port Moresby
Attendance: 995
Referee: Silvia Reyes (Peru)
21 November 2016
16:00

United States	1–1	Ghana
Pugh 22'	Report	Murphy 20' (o.g.)

Sir John Guise Stadium, Port Moresby
Attendance: 3,076
Referee: Sara Persson (Sweden)

=== Group D ===
Pos	Team	Pld	W	D	L	GF	GA	GD	Pts	Qualification
1	Germany	3	3	0	0	8	1	+7	9	Knockout stage
2	Mexico	3	2	0	1	5	5	0	6	Knockout stage
3	South Korea	3	1	0	2	3	4	−1	3	
4	Venezuela	3	0	0	3	3	9	−6	0	

Source: FIFA
14 November 2016
16:00

Germany	3–1	Venezuela
Gier 2', 45'; Schüller 51'	Report	Speckmaier 26'

National Football Stadium, Port Moresby
Attendance: 1,858
Referee: Finau Vulivuli (Fiji)
14 November 2016
19:00

Mexico	2–0	South Korea
Crowther 56'; Palacios 89'	Report

National Football Stadium, Port Moresby
Attendance: 4,511
Referee: Jana Adámková (Czech Republic)

17 November 2016
16:00

Germany	3–0	Mexico
Sanders 48', 85'; Matheis 67'	Report

National Football Stadium, Port Moresby
Attendance: 2,685
Referee: Silvia Reyes (Peru)
17 November 2016
19:00

South Korea	3–0	Venezuela
Namgung Ye-ji 77' (pen.); Han Chae-rin 80'; Kim Seong-mi 90'	Report

National Football Stadium, Port Moresby
Attendance: 6,108
Referee: Katalin Kulcsár (Hungary)

21 November 2016
19:00

South Korea	0–2	Germany
	Report	Orschmann 13'; Sanders 25'

Sir John Guise Stadium, Port Moresby
Attendance: 7,218
Referee: Marianela Araya Cruz (Costa Rica)
21 November 2016
19:00

Venezuela	2–3	Mexico
García 55'; Moreno 83'	Report	Palacios 4', 10'; T. González 53'

Bava Park, Port Moresby
Attendance: 2,076
Referee: Monika Mularczyk (Poland)

== Knockout stage ==
In the knockout stages, if a match is level at the end of normal playing time, extra time is played (two periods of 15 minutes each) and followed, if necessary, by a penalty shoot-out to determine the winner, except for the third place match where no extra time is played as the match is played directly before the final.

On 18 March 2016, the FIFA Executive Committee agreed that the competition would be part of the International Football Association Board's trial to allow a fourth substitute to be made during extra time.

Quarter-finals
24 November — (NFS)
North Korea (a.e.t.)	3
Spain	2
25 November — (SJG)
United States	2
Mexico	1
24 November — (NFS)
Japan	3
Brazil	1
25 November — (SJG)
Germany	0
France	1

Semi-finals
29 November — (SJG)
North Korea (a.e.t.)	2
United States	1
29 November — (SJG)
Japan	1
France (a.e.t.)	2

Final
3 December — (NFS)
North Korea	3
France	1
Third place
3 December — (NFS)
United States	0
Japan	1

=== Quarter-finals ===
24 November 2016
16:00

North Korea	3–2 (a.e.t.)	Spain
Ju Hyo-sim 18'; Ri Hyang-sim 30'; Kim Phyong-hwa 106'	Report	N. García 38'; L. García 63'

National Football Stadium, Port Moresby
Attendance: 3,740
Referee: Casey Reibelt (Australia)

24 November 2016
19:30

Japan	3–1	Brazil
Moriya 45+2'; Matsubara 50', 68'	Report	Gabi Nunes 90+1' (pen.)

National Football Stadium, Port Moresby
Attendance: 9,732
Referee: Jana Adámková (Czech Republic)

25 November 2016
16:00

United States	2–1	Mexico
Watt 81'; Hedge 90+3'	Report	Sánchez 66'

Sir John Guise Stadium, Port Moresby
Attendance: 4,245
Referee: Riem Hussein (Germany)

25 November 2016
19:30

Germany	0–1	France
	Report	D. Cascarino 16'

Sir John Guise Stadium, Port Moresby
Attendance: 9,314
Referee: Quetzalli Alvarado (Mexico)

=== Semi-finals ===
29 November 2016
16:00

North Korea	2–1 (a.e.t.)	United States
Jon So-yon 50' (pen.); Ri Hyang-sim 91'	Report	Jacobs 89'

Sir John Guise Stadium, Port Moresby
Attendance: 5,037
Referee: Katalin Kulcsár (Hungary)

29 November 2016
19:30

Japan	1–2 (a.e.t.)	France
Momiki 109' (pen.)	Report	Matéo 99'; Gathrat 101'

Sir John Guise Stadium, Port Moresby
Attendance: 11,313
Referee: Melissa Borjas (Honduras)

=== Third place match ===
3 December 2016
16:00

United States	0–1	Japan
	Report	Ueno 87'

National Football Stadium, Port Moresby
Attendance: 8,093
Referee: Qin Liang (China)

=== Final ===
3 December 2016
19:30

North Korea	3–1	France
Wi Jong-sim 30'; Kim Phyong-hwa 55'; Jon So-yon 87' (pen.)	Report	Geyoro 17'

National Football Stadium, Port Moresby
Attendance: 14,752
Referee: Jana Adámková (Czech Republic)

2016 FIFA U-20 Women's World Cup winners

North Korea
Second title

== Awards ==
The following awards were given for the tournament:

Golden Ball	Silver Ball	Bronze Ball
(Japan) Hina Sugita	(North Korea) Kim So-hyang	(France) Delphine Cascarino
Golden Boot	Silver Boot	Bronze Boot
(Japan) Mami Ueno	(Brazil) Gabi Nunes	(Sweden) Stina Blackstenius
5 goals, 2 assists	5 goals, 1 assist	5 goals
Golden Glove
(France) Mylène Chavas
FIFA Fair Play Award
Japan

== Goalscorers ==
5 goals

- (Brazil) Gabi Nunes
- (Japan) Mami Ueno
- (Sweden) Stina Blackstenius

4 goals

- (Japan) Yuka Momiki
- (North Korea) Kim So-hyang
- (North Korea) Ri Hyang-sim

3 goals

- (Brazil) Brena
- (France) Clara Matéo
- (Germany) Stefanie Sanders
- (Mexico) Kiana Palacios
- (North Korea) Jon So-yon
- (Spain) Lucía García

2 goals

- (Brazil) Yasmim
- (France) Delphine Cascarino
- (Germany) Madeline Gier
- (Japan) Yui Hasegawa
- (Japan) Shiho Matsubara
- (Nigeria) Chinwendu Ihezuo
- (North Korea) Ju Hyo-sim
- (North Korea) Kim Phyong-hwa
- (North Korea) Wi Jong-sim
- (Spain) Mariona Caldentey
- (United States) Mallory Pugh
- (United States) Ally Watt

1 goal

- (Brazil) Duda
- (Brazil) Geyse
- (Brazil) Katrine
- (Canada) Gabrielle Carle
- (France) Juliane Gathrat
- (France) Grace Geyoro
- (France) Marie-Charlotte Léger
- (Germany) Saskia Matheis
- (Germany) Dina Orschmann
- (Germany) Lea Schüller
- (Ghana) Jane Ayieyam
- (Ghana) Sandra Owusu-Ansah
- (Japan) Honoka Hayashi
- (Japan) Miyabi Moriya
- (Japan) Hina Sugita
- (Mexico) Jacqueline Crowther
- (Mexico) Teresa González
- (Mexico) Maria Sánchez
- (New Zealand) Tayla Christensen
- (New Zealand) Isabella Coombes
- (Nigeria) Joy Bokiri
- (Nigeria) Ihuoma Onyebuchi
- (Nigeria) Chinaza Uchendu
- (North Korea) Ri Un-sim
- (North Korea) Sung Hyang-sim
- (North Korea) U Sol-gyong
- (Papua New Guinea) Nicollete Ageva
- (South Korea) Han Chae-rin
- (South Korea) Kim Seong-mi
- (South Korea) Namgung Ye-ji
- (Spain) Aitana Bonmati
- (Spain) Nahikari García
- (Spain) Patricia Guijarro
- (Spain) Alba Redondo
- (Sweden) Anna Anvegård
- (Sweden) Johanna Rytting Kaneryd
- (United States) Kelcie Hedge
- (United States) Natalie Jacobs
- (United States) Ashley Sanchez
- (Venezuela) Gabriela García
- (Venezuela) Kika Moreno
- (Venezuela) Mariana Speckmaier

Own goal

- (Brazil) Carla (against North Korea)
- (United States) Casey Murphy (against Ghana)
