= Christy Ohiaeriaku =

Nigerian footballer (born 1996)

Personal information
- Date of birth: 13 December 1996 (age 29)
- Height: 1.76 m (5 ft 9 1/2 in)
- Position: Goalkeeper

Senior career*
Years	Team	Apps	(Gls)
- Osun Babes
- Rivers Angels
- Osun Babes
2016–	IFK Ostersund		

International career
2019–	Nigeria	2	(0)
- * Club domestic league appearances and goals

Christy Ohiaeriaku // (born 13 December 1996) is a Nigerian women's international footballer who plays as a goalkeeper. She is a member of the Nigeria women's national football team. At the club level, she played for Osun Babes, Rivers Angels in Nigeria and, since 2016, for IFK Ostersund in Sweden.

== Football career ==
Ohiaeriaku played for Osun Babes as their first-choice goalkeeper in the inaugural Nigeria Women Premier League, where the team finished in third place. This performance resulted in the teenager being called up to the national team. She subsequently left to join reigning champions Rivers Angels after they won two subsequent league titles, before transferring back to Osun Babes in early 2016. In a statement, she thanked the team and the support staff at Rivers Angels, describing them as family.

Later that year, she transferred to Swedish side IFK Ostersund on a one-year deal with a possible extension of a further year.

=== International career ===
Prior to the 2014 African Women's Championship, Ohiaeriaku was included in a provisional squad for the Nigeria women's national football team. She was part of the team at the 2015 FIFA Women's World Cup, being one of three goalkeepers chosen. She did not start any games, instead being an unused substitute for the matches against the United States, Australia and Sweden in what was described as the "group of death".

In the run up to the 2016 FIFA U-20 Women's World Cup, she hoped her continued football in Sweden would help her achieve a place in the squad. She was subsequently named in the squad for the tournament.
