= Sandra Owusu-Ansah =

Ghanaian association football player

Personal information
- Full name: Sandra Owusu-Ansah
- Date of birth: 29 January 2000 (age 26)
- Place of birth: Kumasi, Ghana
- Position: Forward

Team information
- Current team: Spartak Subotica
- Number: 9

Senior career*
Years	Team	Apps	(Gls)
2014–2016	Fabulous Ladies		
2016–2017	Supreme Ladies		
2017–2018	Zouk Mosbeh		
2019–2021	Supreme Ladies		(10)
2021–	Spartak Subotica	0	(0)

International career^{‡}
2014–2016	Ghana U17	10	(6)
2015–2018	Ghana U20	18	(8)
2020–	Ghana	4	(3)
- * Club domestic league appearances and goals ‡ National team caps and goals as of 13 July 2024

Sandra Owusu-Ansah (born 29 January 2000) is a Ghanaian professional footballer who plays as a forward for Serbian Women's Super League side ZFK Spartak Subotica and the Ghana women's national football team. She represented Ghana at the U17 level at two World Cups in 2014 and 2016, serving as the captain in the latter whilst representing them at the U20 level at two World Cups in 2016 and 2018.

== Early life and education ==
Owusu-Ansah was born on 29 January 2000 in Kumasi, the capital city of Ashanti Region to Kofi Owusu Ansah and Madam Yaa Pokuaa. She attended T.I. Ahmadiyya Senior High School, Kumasi for her secondary school education. She was a member of the school's football team.

== Club career ==
=== Fabulous Ladies 2014–16 ===
Owusu-Ansah started her career with Fabulous Ladies founded by Habiba Atta Forson. She was also a member of the Airtel Rising Stars (Ashanti Zone), a colt (juvenile) football talent hunt started by Airtel in Africa that sought to discover and nurture talented under 17 years male and female footballers who would have gone unnoticed and untapped.

=== Zouk Mosbeh 2017–18 ===
Owusu-Ansah moved to Lebanese-based Zouk Mosbeh in September 2017 on a one-year contract. In her only season in Lebanon, she won the League, FA Cup and Super Cup with her Ghanaian compatriot Alice Kusi emerging as the top scorer of the league. She got injured during the last match of the league which caused her to miss the 2018 Africa Women Cup of Nations and stay out on the touchline for more than a year.

=== Supreme Ladies 2020–21 ===
In 2020, she to her former club Ghana Women's Premier League side Supreme Ladies in a bid to revive her career after a long injury lay off. She served as the club captain during the 2020–21. In the month April, she scored 4 goals in 4 league matches and was nominated for the NASCO GWPL Player of the Month for April. At the end of the 2020–21 season, she scored 10 goals ending the season as the club's top goal scorer and third top goal scorer in the league. Her goal against Kumasi Sports Academy was nominated for the goal of the season at the 2021 Ghana Football Awards.

=== Spartak Subotica 2021– ===
On 2 August 2021, Serbian Women's Super League champions ZFK Spartak Subotica announced that they had signed Owusu-Ansah on a one-year deal ahead of the 2021–22 season. She was set to join her compatriot Alice Kusi who had also joined the club.

== International career ==
=== Youth ===
Owusu Ansah played has capped for Ghana at all levels starting from the U-17 level, the Black Princesses. She was named in the squad for the 2014 FIFA U-17 Women's World Cup at the age of 14. She scored two goals, one against South Korea and the other against Canada, as Ghana topped their group to qualify for the quarter-finals. They were however eliminated by Italy after a penalty shootout.

She was immediately promoted to the U-20 team, the Black Maidens, where she scored four goals during the 2015 African U-20 Women's World Cup Qualifying Tournament to end as the team's top scorer and help Ghana qualify for the 2016 FIFA U-20 Women's World Cup. In 2016, whilst she was still eligible to play for the U17 side, with her previous experience she was named as the captain of the side, scoring two goals African U-17 Women's World Cup Qualifying Tournament to help Ghana secure a place at the world cup.

She made the squad for the 2016 FIFA U-17 Women's World Cup in September 2016. After a 5–0 loss to Japan in their first group match, she scored in the following two matches against United States and Paraguay to help Ghana progress into the quarter-finals. They were however eliminated in the quarter-finals by North Korea after they scored a goal 90 minutes, and four minutes of additional time. Her goal against Paraguay was nominated for the goal of the tournament award by FIFA.

Two months after captaining the U17 at the World Cup, in October 2016, she made the squad for the 2016 FIFA U-20 Women's World Cup. During the tournament, she scored a goal against France and was adjudged the player of the match, however Ghana were eliminated at the group stages. In 2018, she had become one of the key performers of the U20 side along with Ernestina Abambila and Princella Adubea. She scored 2 goals, whilst Adubea scored 10 goals during the qualifying tournament to help Ghana seal their spot for 2018 FIFA U-20 Women's World Cup. In July 2018, she made the squad for the main tournament, however before the start of the tournament Adubea got injured. Without her striking partner, she and her team struggled at the tournament and were eliminated in the group stages. She managed to score only a goal in the tournament in Ghana's 4–1 loss to France. At the end of the competition, she expressed the difficulty in their play due to absence of Adubea.

=== Senior ===
In March 2017, there were calls from the general public for her to be included in the senior team, however the head coach of the side Yusif Basigi stated that there was need for a good transition of promoting into the senior team. In October 2018, She was called up to the Ghana national team in 2018 ahead of the 2018 Africa Women Cup of Nations, with Ghana as the host nation. She was ruled out of the tournament after failing to recover from injury she picked whilst playing for Zouk Mosbeh in the final match of the Lebanese League. Despite joining the team for two preparatory games against Zambia and Kenya, she failed to recover and didn't make the final squad. On 30 November 2020, in a match against Morocco she scored a brace in a four-minute spell to secure a 2–0 victory for Ghana.

== International goals ==
No.	Date	Venue	Opponent	Score	Result	Competition
1.	19 February 2023	Stade de l'Amitié, Cotonou, Benin	Benin	3–0	3–0	Friendly

== Honours ==
Zouk Mosbeh

- Lebanese Women's Football League: 2017–18
- Lebanese Women's FA Cup: 2017–18
- Lebanese Women's Super Cup: 2018

Spartak Subotica

- Serbian Women's Super League: 2021–22
- Serbian Women's Cup: 2021–22

Individual

- SWAG Most Promising Star of the year: 2016
- CAF Youth Player of the Year nominee: 2017
- FIFA Puskás Award nominee: 2021
