= Pauline Dhaeyer =

French footballer (born 1996)

Personal information
- Date of birth: 27 March 1996 (age 30)
- Place of birth: Clamart, France
- Height: 1.73 m (5 ft 8 in)
- Position: Defender

Youth career
- 2002–2008: SCM Châtillon
- 2008–2011: COM Bagneux
- 2011–2012: Issy

Senior career*
Years	Team	Apps	(Gls)
2012-2016	Issy	67	(2)
2016–2019	Vendée La Roche	56	(9)
2019–2020	Issy	16	(0)
2020–2022	Nantes	28	(1)

International career
2012	France U16	1	(0)
2015	France U19	9	(1)
2016	France U20	2	(0)
2018	France U23	1	(0)
Medal record
Representing France
Women's football
FIFA U-20 Women's World Cup
Runner-up	2016 Papua New Guinea
- * Club domestic league appearances and goals

Pauline Dhaeyer (born 27 March 1996), is a French former professional footballer who played as a defender for Issy, Vendée La Roche and Nantes.

== Honours ==
Individual

- UEFA Women's Under-19 Championship team of the tournament: 2015
