= Azume Adams =

Ghanaian footballer (born 1997)

Azuma Adams
Personal information
- Date of birth: 28 December 1997 (age 28)
- Place of birth: Tamale, Ghana
- Height: 1.71 m (5 ft 7 in)
- Position: Goalkeeper

Team information
- Current team: Hasaacas Ladies(GHA)

International career^{‡}
Years	Team	Apps	(Gls)
- Ghana
- ‡ National team caps and goals as of 14 September 2019

Azuma Adams (born 28 December 1997) is a Ghanaian international footballer who plays as a goalkeeper.

== Career ==
She has appeared in two match for the Ghana women's national under-17 football team. She was on the Squad at the 2012 FIFA U-17 Women's World Cup, 2014 FIFA U-17 Women's World Cup and 2016 FIFA U-20 Women's World Cup

== See also ==
- List of Ghana women's international footballers
