= Maja Göthberg =

Swedish footballer

Personal information
- Date of birth: 16 July 1997 (age 29)
- Place of birth: Sweden
- Position: Midfielder

Team information
- Current team: Lazio

Senior career*
Years	Team	Apps	(Gls)
2014–2015	Hovås Billdal IF	45	(2)
2016–2017	Kopparbergs/Göteborg FC	17	(0)
2017	Hammarby IF	0	(0)
2019	Kungbacka	0	(0)
2019	Sundsvalls	10	(0)
2020–2023	KuPS	73	(1)
2023–	Lazio	29	(4)

International career^{‡}
2014–2016	Sweden U19	12	(2)
2016	Sweden U20		
- * Club domestic league appearances and goals as of 4 July 2020 ‡ National team caps and goals as of 21 May 2016

Maja Göthberg (born 16 July 1997) is a Swedish football midfielder who plays for Lazio.

== Personal life ==
She is married to Finnish ice hockey player Miikka Pitkänen.

== Wrongful Termination Claim ==
On 25 June 2024, Göthberg's Agent Federico Valentino met with the Club's Sporting Director Raffaele Pinzani and the Club’s Sports Secretary Assistant Raimondo Grassadonia to discuss Göthberg's contract renewal. On July 12th, Göthberg found out she is pregnant and informed her Agent. In the subsequent days, they discussed how to best inform the Club and ultimately Göthberg instructed Valentino to contact Lazio, even before they receive a draft of the contract, as that impacted transportation logistics. Valentino contacted Lazio on July 18th. Göthberg and Lazio failed to sign a new contract, with Göthberg and her representatives arguing Lazio withdrew due to her pregnancy status and Lazio arguing Lazio interpreted Göthberg's silence in the negotiation process as "manifestation of a contrary will".

On 30 August 2024 Göthberg lodged a damages compensation claim for breach of contract before the Dispute Resolution Chamber (DRC). DRC dismissed the claims on 24 March 2025, and Göthberg appealed to the Court of Arbitration for Sport (CAS) on 16 June 2025. The hearing was held at the CAS headquarters at Lausanne, Switzerland on 24 November 2025.

On 26 May 2026, CAS ruled in favor of Göthberg and ordered Lazio to pay her salary compensation with interest and compensation of personality rights with interest. Media outlets regard this as a landmark decision for pregnancy-related contract termination in women's football.

== Honors ==
Sweden U19

Winner

- UEFA Women's Under-19 Championship: 2015
