= Ellen Löfqvist =

Swedish footballer (born 1997)

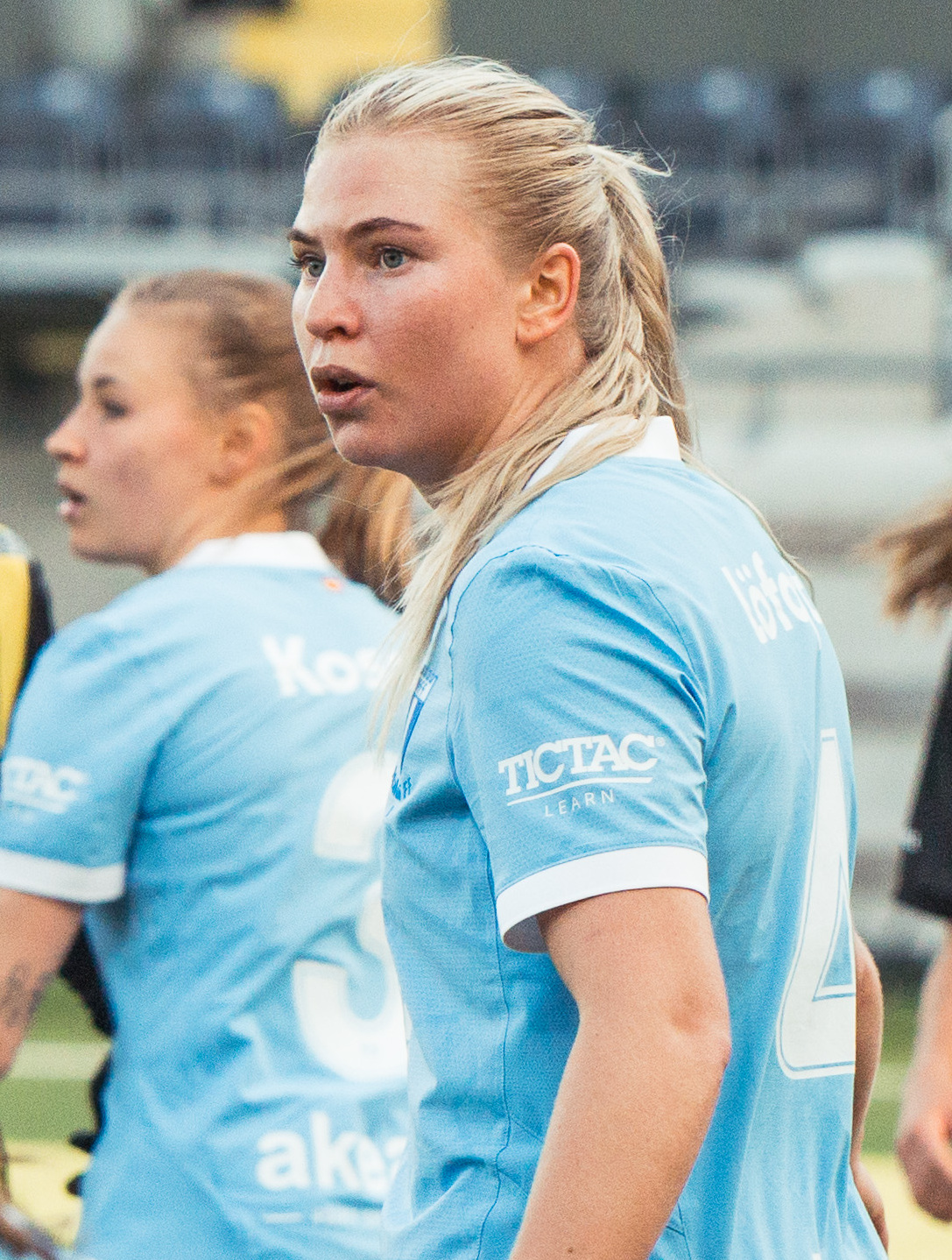
- Löfqvist with Malmö FF in 2025

Personal information
- Full name: Ellen Christina Löfqvist
- Date of birth: 8 October 1997 (age 29)
- Place of birth: Piteå, Sweden
- Position: Defender

Team information
- Current team: Malmö FF
- Number: 4

Youth career
- Alnö IF

Senior career*
| Years | Team | Apps | (Gls) |
| 2013 | Alnö IF | 16 | (2) |
| 2014–2015 | Sundsvalls DFF | 41 | (13) |
| 2016–2024 | Piteå IF | 176 | (7) |
| 2025– | Malmö | 22 | (0) |

International career
| 2013 | Sweden U17 | 12 | (0) |
| 2014–2015 | Sweden U19 | 29 | (3) |
| 2017–2020 | Sweden U23 | 17 | (0) |
- * Club domestic league appearances and goals as of 21:28, 31 December 2025 (UTC)

Ellen Christina Löfqvist (born 10 August 1997) is a Swedish professional footballer who currently plays as a defender for Malmö in the Damallsvenskan.

== Club career ==
She joined Division 1 club Sundsvalls on 9 January 2014. In 2015, she helped them finish first in the norra Svealand group and win promotion to the Elitettan.

She was the team captain of Piteå between October 2018 and March 2022. In her first season as captain, Piteå won their first National Championship title.

== International career ==
Löfqvist was part of the squad that represented Sweden at the U19 European Championship in Israel in July 2015, where Sweden won gold.
