= Mylène Chavas =

French footballer (born 1998)

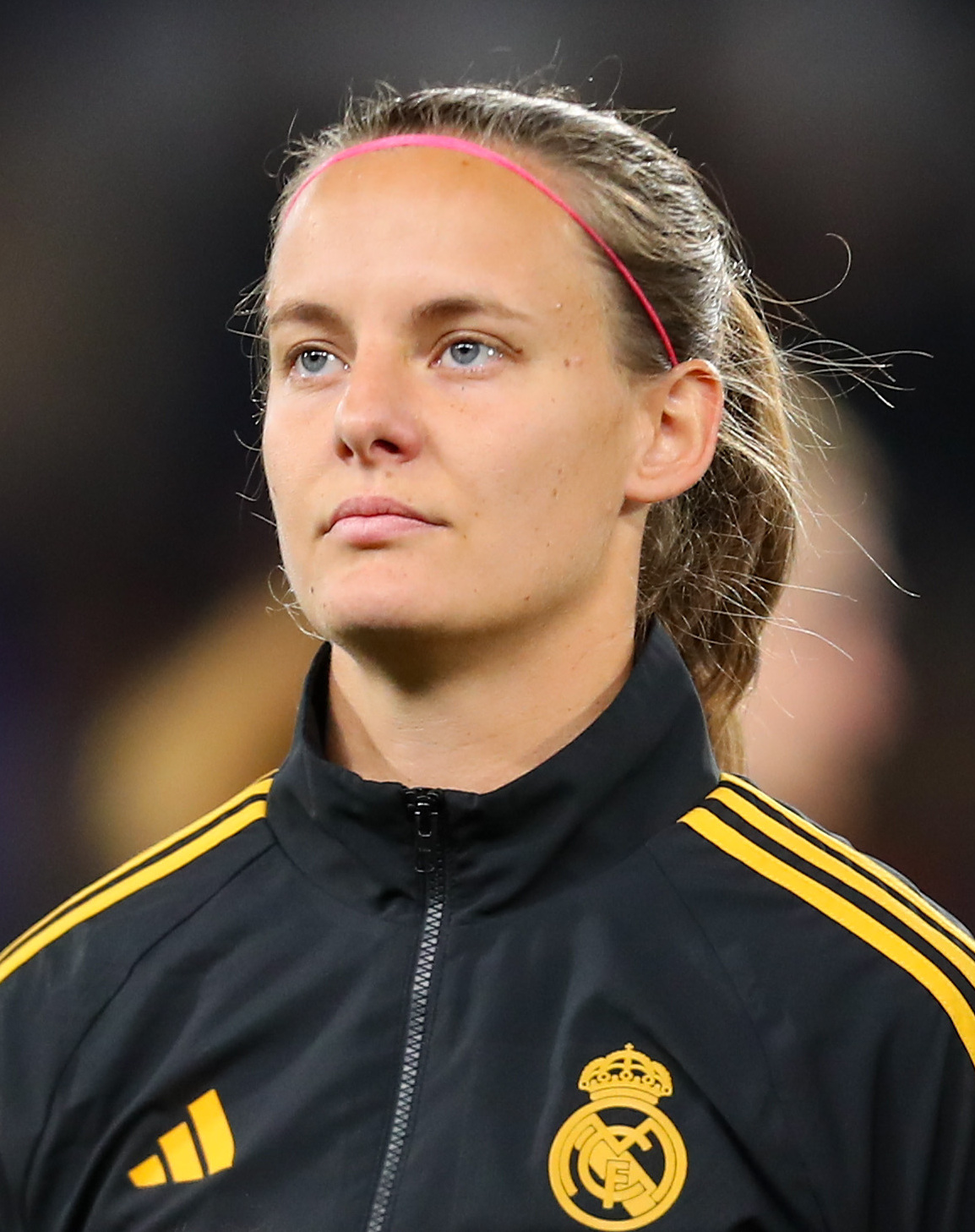
- Chavas with Real Madrid in 2024

Personal information
- Date of birth: 7 January 1998 (age 28)
- Place of birth: Sainte-Colombe-sur-Gand, France
- Height: 1.78 m (5 ft 10 in)
- Position: Goalkeeper

Team information
- Current team: Paris FC
- Number: 16

Youth career
- 2005–2012: ES Trèfle
- 2012–2015: Saint-Étienne

Senior career*
Years	Team	Apps	(Gls)
2015–2018	Saint-Étienne	46	(0)
2018–2021	Dijon	33	(0)
2021–2023	Bordeaux	33	(0)
2023–2025	Real Madrid	9	(0)
2025–	Paris FC	27	(0)

International career^{‡}
2013	France U16	2	(0)
2013–2014	France U17	2	(0)
2016–2017	France U19	19	(0)
2016–2018	France U20	19	(0)
2019–2021	France U23	4	(0)
2022–	France	1	(0)
Medal record
Representing France
Women's football
UEFA Women's Nations League
Third place	2025
FIFA U-20 Women's World Cup
Runner-up	2016 Papua New Guinea
UEFA Women's Under-19 Championship
Winner	2016 Slovakia
Runner-up	2017 Northern Ireland
- * Club domestic league appearances and goals as of 22 November 2026 ‡ National team caps and goals as of 25 June 2022

Mylène Chavas (born 7 January 1998) is a French professional footballer who plays as a goalkeeper for Première Ligue club Paris FC and the France national team.

== Club career ==
In June 2021, Chavas joined Bordeaux on a two-year deal. On 5 July 2023, she joined Liga F club Real Madrid. On 14 June 2025, she signed a three-year contract with Paris FC.

== International career ==
Chavas has represented France at various youth levels. She was part of the under-19 national team which won the UEFA Women's Under-19 Championship in 2016. She was also under-20 team's starting goalkeeper at the 2016 FIFA U-20 Women's World Cup. Despite her team's loss to North Korea in the final, she went on to win Golden Glove award for the best goalkeeper in the tournament.

In May 2022, Chavas was included in France's squad for the UEFA Women's Euro 2022. She made her senior team debut on 25 June 2022 in a 4–0 friendly win against Cameroon.

== Career statistics ==
=== International ===
As of match played 25 June 2022

Appearances and goals by national team and year
National team	Year	Apps	Goals
France	2022	1	0
France	2023	0	0
France	2025	0	0
France	2026	0	0
Total		1	0

== Honours ==
France U19

- UEFA Women's Under-19 Championship: 2016

Individual

- FIFA U-20 Women's World Cup Golden Glove: 2016
- UNFP Première Ligue goalkeeper of the year: 2025–26
- LFFP Première Ligue best goalkeeper: 2025–26
- UEFA Women's Under-19 Championship Team of the Tournament: 2016, 2017
- UNFP Première Ligue team of the season: 2025–26
- LFFP Première Ligue team of the season: 2025–26
