= Anna Oskarsson =

Swedish footballer (born 1996)

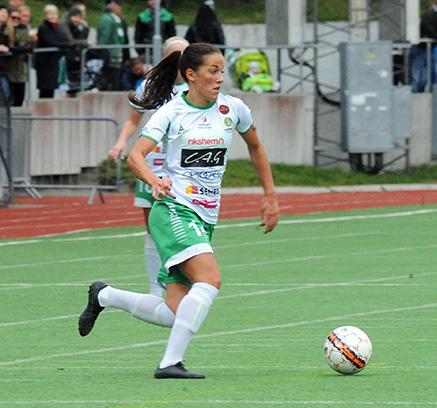
- Anna Oskarsson playing for Hammarby

Personal information
- Full name: Anna Klara Ellen Oskarsson
- Date of birth: 23 June 1996 (age 30)
- Place of birth: Eskilstuna, Sweden,
- Height: 1.73 m (5 ft 8 in)
- Position: Defender

Team information
- Current team: AIK
- Number: 22

Youth career
- FC Gute

Senior career*
Years	Team	Apps	(Gls)
2013	IFK Kalmar	23	(3)
2014–2015	Jitex BK	29	(1)
2015–2017	Hammarby	46	(5)
2017–2019	Linköpings FC	49	(3)
2020–2023	Eskilstuna United	65	(1)
2023–2024	Glasgow City	8	(0)
2024–	AIK	21	(0)

International career^{‡}
2018–	Sweden	5	(0)
- * Club domestic league appearances and goals as of 10 June 2025 ‡ National team caps and goals as of 00:50, 8 September 2022 (UTC)

Anna Klara Ellen Oskarsson (also spelled Oscarsson; born 23 June 1996) is a Swedish footballer who plays as a defender for Damallsvenskan club AIK Stockholm.

== Career ==
She started with Jitex Mölndal BK as a youth player. Oskarsson has also represented FC Gute.

Oskarsson represented Sweden in the U19 European Championships in Israel 2015 and the U20 World Championship in Papua New Guinea in 2016.

She made her debut for the senior national team at the 2018 Algarve Cup, substituting in for Jonna Andersson in the 77th minute of Sweden's opening fixture, a 3–1 win over Canada. A thigh injury sustained in December 2018 caused Oskarsson to drop out of national team contention in the run up to the 2019 FIFA Women's World Cup.

Before the 2020 season, Oscarsson was recruited by Eskilstuna United, where she signed a two-year contract. Oscarsson played all 22 league matches during the 2020 season. In November 2021, she extended her contract in Eskilstuna by two year.

Oscarsson signed for Glasgow City of the Scottish Women's Premier League in February 2023.

== Honours ==
Sweden

- Algarve Cup: 2018
