= Laura Condon =

French association footballer (born 1997)

Personal information
- Date of birth: 18 March 1997 (age 29)
- Height: 1.59 m (5 ft 3 in)
- Position: Midfielder

Team information
- Current team: Lazio

International career
Years	Team	Apps	(Gls)
- France (women U-19)

Laura Condon (born 18 March 1997 in Castres) is a French footballer who plays as a midfielder for Lazio.

== International career ==
Condon has represented France at youth level.
