= Ronja Aronsson =

Swedish footballer (born 1997)

Personal information
- Full name: Ronja Othilia Gunilla Aronsson
- Date of birth: 26 September 1997 (age 29)
- Place of birth: Piteå, Sweden,
- Height: 1.62 m (5 ft 4 in)
- Position: Defender

Team information
- Current team: Vålerenga
- Number: 17

Senior career*
Years	Team	Apps	(Gls)
2011–2019	Piteå IF	99	(2)
2020–2021	Linköpings	35	(1)
2022	Fiorentina	6	(0)
2022–2024	Piteå IF	58	(2)
2025–	Vålerenga	17	(3)

International career
2012–2013	Sweden U17	10	(0)
2014–2015	Sweden U19	11	(0)
2016	Sweden U20	3	(0)
2019	Sweden U23	2	(0)
- * Club domestic league appearances and goals as of 4 October 2025

Ronja Aronsson (born 20 December 1997) is a Swedish football defender currently playing for Vålerenga in the Toppserien.

== Playing career ==
=== Club ===
Aronsson debuted for Piteå IF at the age of 13, making her the second-youngest Damallsvenskan player of all time and only seven days older than Catola Karlsson, who held the record. The debut took place on October 8, 2011 in a 2–1 away defeat against Dalsjöfors GoIF where Aronsson was substituted in the 88th minute.

On 12 January 2022, Aronsson joined Fiorentina.

=== International ===
Aronsson was part of the squad that represented Sweden at the U19 European Championship in Israel in July 2015, where Sweden won gold.
