= Mami Ueno =

Japanese footballer

Mami Ueno 上野 真実
Personal information
- Full name: Mami Ueno
- Date of birth: Kumamoto, Japan
- Height: 1.66 m (5 ft 5 1/2 in)
- Positions: Forward; midfielder

Team information
- Current team: Sanfrecce Horoshima
- Number: 9

Youth career
- 2012–2014: Kamimura Gakuen High School

Senior career*
Years	Team	Apps	(Gls)
2015–2020	Ehime FC	103	(29)
2021–	Sanfrecce Hiroshima	104	(39)
Total		207	(68)

International career^{‡}
2016	Japan U-20	6	(5)
2017–	Japan	21	(4)
Medal record
Representing Japan
FIFA U-20 Women's World Cup
Bronze medal – third place	2016 Papua New Guinea
- * Club domestic league appearances and goals as of 1 June 2026 (UTC) ‡ National team caps and goals as of 2 October 2026 (UTC)

Mami Ueno (上野 真実, Ueno Mami; born September 27, 1996) is a Japanese footballer who plays as a forward for Sanfrecce Hiroshima in the WE League and for the Japan national team.

== Club career ==
Ueno was born in Kumamoto Prefecture on September 27, 1996. After graduating from high school, she joined Ehime FC in 2015.

== National team career ==
Ueno was a member of Japan U-20 national team for 2016 U-20 World Cup and Japan won 3rd place. She scored 5 goals and 2 assists, and get Golden Shoe awards. On April 9, 2017, she debuted for Japan national team against Costa Rica. She played 6 games for Japan.

== National team statistics ==
Japan national team
Year	Apps	Goals
2017	3	0
2018	0	0
2019	3	0
2020	2	0
2021	0	0
2022	2	1
2024	2	0
2025	3	0
2026	6	3
Total	21	4

== International goals ==
No.	Date	Venue	Opponent	Score	Result	Competition
1.	23 July 2022	Kashima Soccer Stadium, Kashima, Japan	Chinese Taipei	2–1	4–1	2022 EAFF E-1 Football Championship
2.	21 September 2026	Shizuoka Stadium, Fukuroi, Japan	Chinese Taipei	3–0	4–0	2026 Asian Games
3.	25 September 2026	Shizuoka Stadium, Fukuroi, Japan	Philippines	2–0	4–0	2026 Asian Games
4.	2 October 2026	Shizuoka Stadium, Fukuroi, Japan	North Korea	1–0	2–2 (a.e.t.) (5–3 p)	2026 Asian Games

== Honours ==
Sanfrecce Hiroshima Regina

- WE League Cup: 2023–24, 2024–25

Japan

- Asian Games: 2022
- EAFF E-1 Football Championship: 2019
- EAFF E-1 Football Championship: 2022
