= Noémie Carage =

Association football player (born 1996)

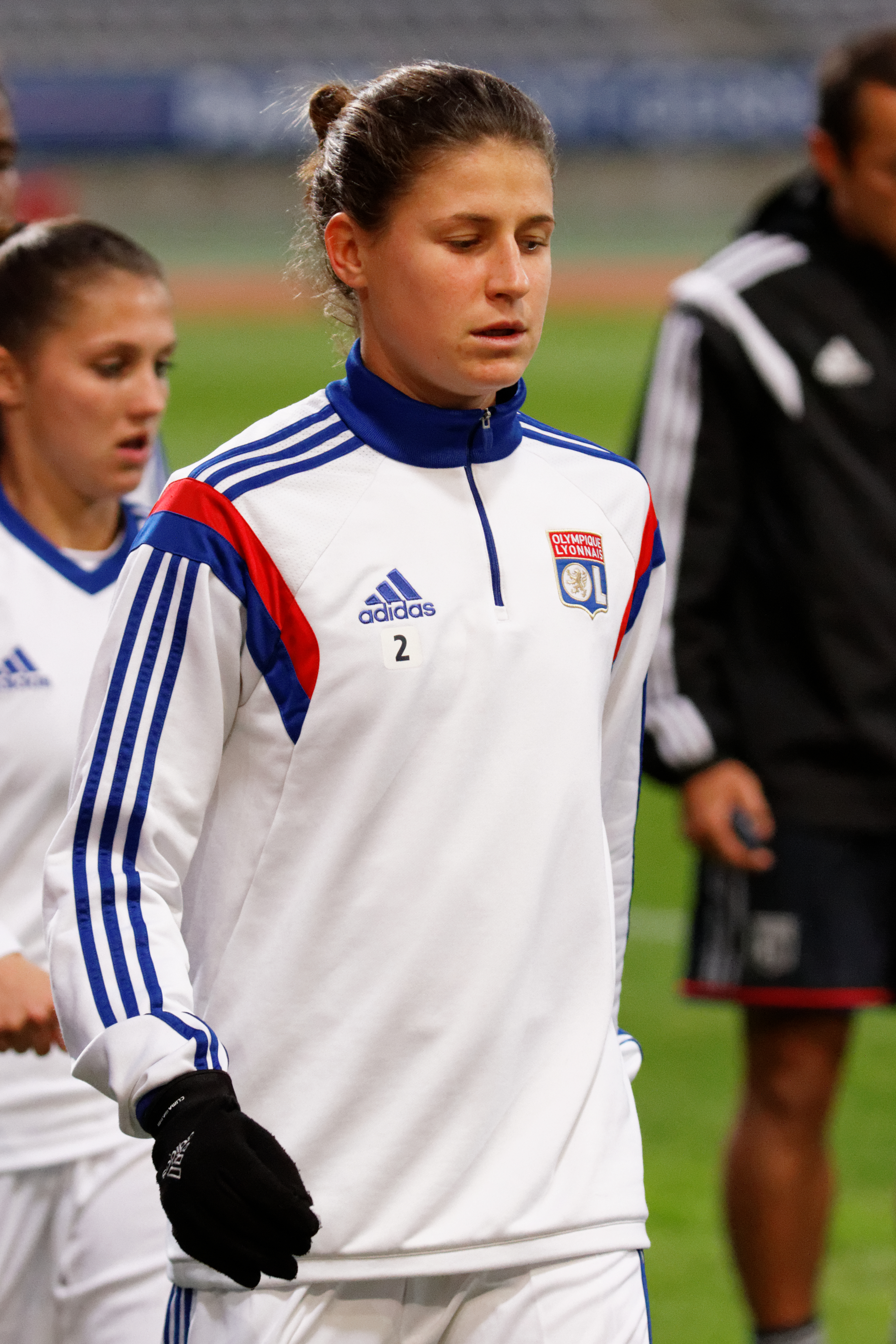

Personal information
- Date of birth: 11 September 1996 (age 30)
- Place of birth: Gleizé, France
- Height: 1.71 m (5 ft 7 in)
- Position: Left back

Team information
- Current team: Servette FC Chênois

Senior career*
Years	Team	Apps	(Gls)
2013–2015	Lyon	1	(0)
2015–2016	Guingamp	8	(0)
2016–2018	Saint-Étienne	18	(0)
2018–2022	Dijon	65	(1)
2022–2023	Milan	4	(0)
2023–2024	Saint-Étienne	22	(2)
2024–2026	Dijon	9	(0)

International career
2011–2013	France U17	8	(0)
2013–2015	France U19	10	(1)
- * Club domestic league appearances and goals as of 31 December 2023 (UTC)

Noémie Carage (born 9 September 1996) is a French footballer who plays as a left back for Servette FC Chênois.
