= Saskia Matheis =

German footballer (born 1997)

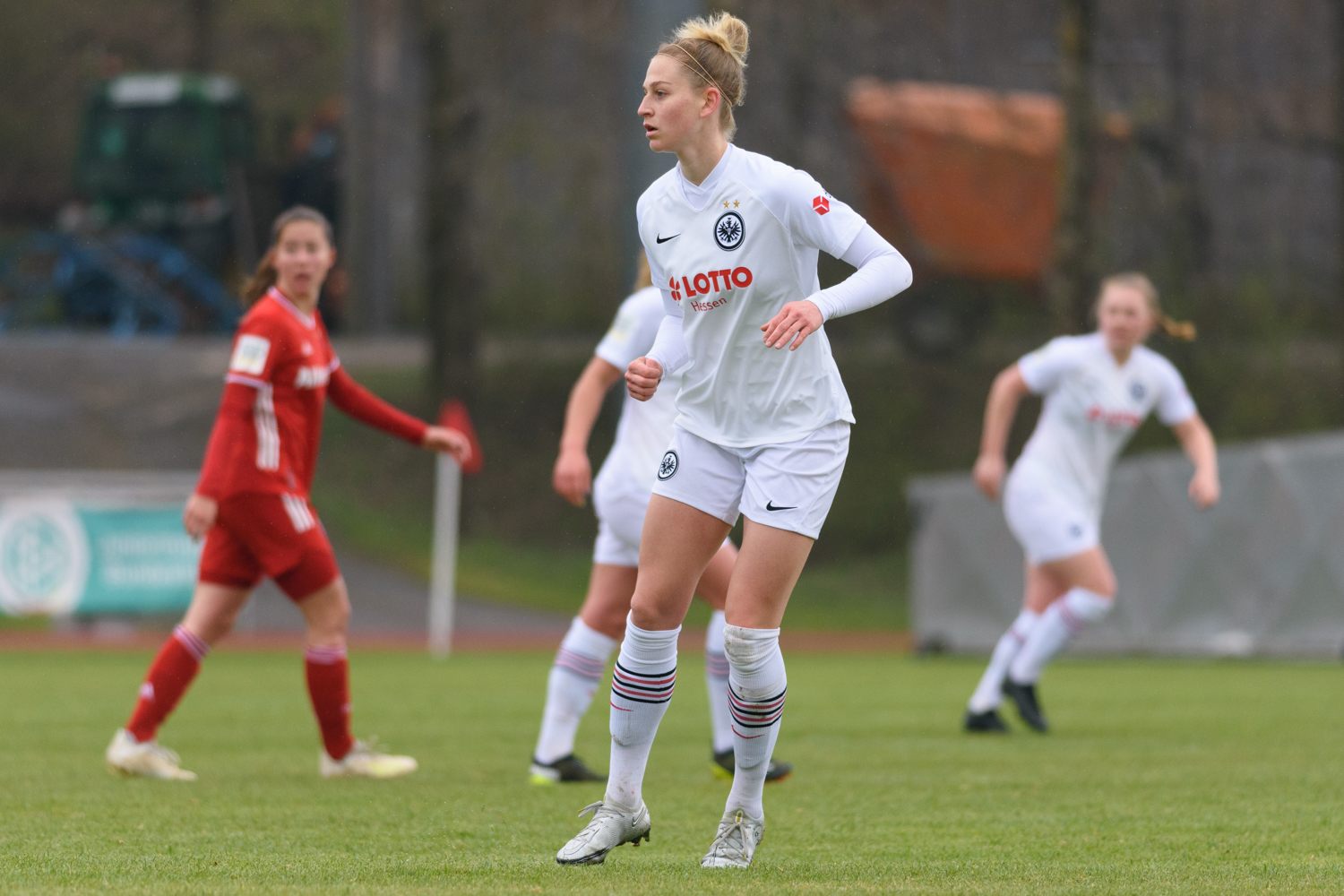
- Matheis in 2021

Personal information
- Date of birth: 6 June 1997 (age 29)
- Place of birth: Offenbach am Main, Germany
- Height: 1.70 m (5 ft 7 in)
- Position: Midfielder

Team information
- Current team: 1. FSV Mainz 05
- Number: 19

Senior career*
Years	Team	Apps	(Gls)
2013–2022	Eintracht Frankfurt II	39	(6)
2014–2022	Eintracht Frankfurt	42	(0)
2022–2026	Werder Bremen	52	(3)
2026–	1. FSV Mainz 05	5	(1)

International career
2010–2012	Germany U15	8	(4)
2013	Germany U16	4	(1)
2012–2014	Germany U17	18	(1)
2015–2016	Germany U19	10	(0)
2015–2016	Germany U20	9	(1)
- * Club domestic league appearances and goals as of 19 September 2026

Saskia Matheis (born 6 June 1997) is a German footballer who plays as a midfielder for Frauen Bundesliga club 1. FSV Mainz 05.
