= Rebecca Knaak =

German footballer (born 1996)

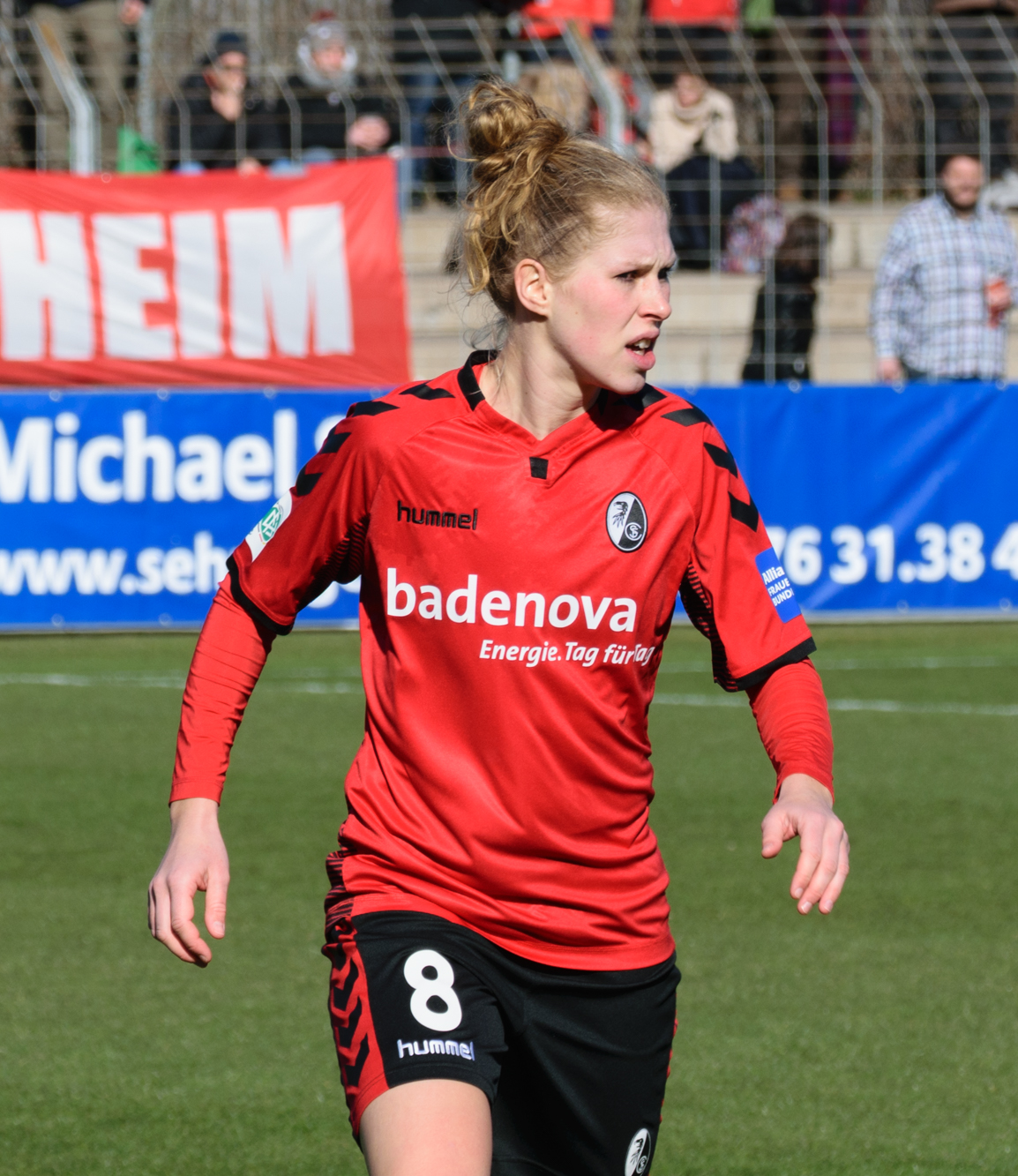
- Knaak with SC Freiburg in 2018

Personal information
- Date of birth: 23 June 1996 (age 30)
- Place of birth: Adenau, Germany
- Height: 1.75 m (5 ft 9 in)
- Position: Defender

Team information
- Current team: Manchester City
- Number: 27

Youth career
- SV Reifferscheid
- –2012: SC 07 Bad Neuenahr

Senior career*
Years	Team	Apps	(Gls)
2012–2013	SC 07 Bad Neuenahr	12	(0)
2013–2017	Bayer Leverkusen	59	(6)
2017–2021	SC Freiburg	86	(9)
2022–2024	FC Rosengård	36	(16)
2025–	Manchester City	26	(6)

International career^{‡}
2012	Germany U17	5	(3)
2013–2015	Germany U19	11	(2)
2014–2016	Germany U20	10	(1)
2025–	Germany	15	(0)
- * Club domestic league appearances and goals as of 22:20, 22 November 2026 (UTC) ‡ National team caps and goals as of 22:45, 5 June 2026 (UTC)

Rebecca Knaak (German: [ʁeˈbɛka ˈknaːk]; born 23 June 1996) is a German professional footballer who plays as a defender for Women's Super League club Manchester City and the Germany national team.

== Club career ==
Knaak begun her professional career at the age of 15, where she received a professional contract with SC 07 Bad Neuenahr, where she had played in their youth setup. She played once for the second team in the 2. Bundesliga when she came on as a substitute in a 2–2 draw against 1. FFC Niederkirchen. She would make her Bundesliga debut on 28 October 2012 in a goalless draw against VfL Sindelfingen, coming on as a substitute in the 88th minute for Rachel Rinast.

For the 2013–14 season, Knaak signed a contract with Bayer Leverkusen. On 16 November 2014, she scored her first league goal in a 5–1 win against SC Freiburg. On 2 March 2017, Knaak announced her move to league rivals SC Freiburg.

In January 2022, it was announced that Knaak will sign with Damallsvenskan club FC Rosengård, signing a three-year contract with them. In her first season at FC Rosengård, she won the league and cup double with the team. Knaak scored her first goal in the Damallsvenskan in a 2–0 win against BK Häcken.

On 1 January 2025, Knaak transferred to Women's Super League club Manchester City, signing a one-and-a-half-year contract. She scored her first goal for the club on 19 January in a 4–2 defeat against Manchester United. On 12 December 2025, Knaak signed a contract extension until 2028.

== International career ==
On 12 June 2025, Knaak was called up to the Germany squad for the UEFA Women's Euro 2025.

== Career statistics ==
=== Club ===
As of match played 22 November 2026

Appearances and goals by club, season and competition
Club	Season	League			National cup (Note: Includes DFB-Pokal, Svenska Cupen, Women's FA Cup)		League cup (Note: Includes Women's League Cup)		Continental (Note: Includes UEFA Women's Champions League)		Total	
Club	Season	Division	Apps	Goals	Apps	Goals	Apps	Goals	Apps	Goals	Apps	Goals
SC 07 Bad Neuenahr	2012–13	Frauen-Bundesliga	12	0	0	0	—		—		12	0
Bayer Leverkusen	2013–14	Frauen-Bundesliga	10	1	2	0	—		—		12	1
Bayer Leverkusen	2014–15	Frauen-Bundesliga	15	1	1	0	—		—		16	1
Bayer Leverkusen	2015–16	Frauen-Bundesliga	17	2	2	0	—		—		19	2
Bayer Leverkusen	2016–17	Frauen-Bundesliga	17	2	3	1	—		—		20	3
Bayer Leverkusen	Total		59	6	8	1	0	0	0	0	67	7
SC Freiburg	2017–18	Frauen-Bundesliga	17	1	3	1	—		—		20	2
SC Freiburg	2018–19	Frauen-Bundesliga	21	2	5	1	—		—		26	3
SC Freiburg	2019–20	Frauen-Bundesliga	20	3	2	2	—		—		22	5
SC Freiburg	2020–21	Frauen-Bundesliga	16	2	4	1	—		—		20	3
SC Freiburg	2021–22	Frauen-Bundesliga	12	1	2	0	—		—		14	1
SC Freiburg	Total		86	9	16	5	0	0	0	0	102	14
FC Rosengård	2022	Damallsvenskan	13	4	1	0	—		—		14	4
FC Rosengård	2023	Damallsvenskan	4	0	0	0	—		3	0	7	0
FC Rosengård	2024	Damallsvenskan	19	12	2	0	—		4	0	25	12
FC Rosengård	Total		36	16	3	0	0	0	7	0	46	16
Manchester City	2024–25	Women's Super League	8	4	2	0	2	0	0	0	12	4
Manchester City	2025–26	Women's Super League	14	2	4	0	3	0	—		21	2
Manchester City	2026–27	Women's Super League	4	0	0	0	—		3	0	7	0
Manchester City	Total		26	6	6	0	5	0	3	0	40	6
Career total			219	37	33	6	5	0	10	0	267	43

=== International ===
As of match played 5 June 2026

Appearances and goals by national team and year
National team	Year	Apps	Goals
Germany	2025	11	0
Germany	2026	4	0
Total		15	0

== Honours ==
FC Rosengård

- Damallsvenskan: 2022, 2024
- Svenska Cupen: 2021–22

Manchester City

- Women's Super League: 2025–26
- Women's FA Cup: 2025–26

Germany

- FIFA U-20 Women's World Cup: 2014
