= Joy Bokiri =

Nigerian footballer (born 1998)

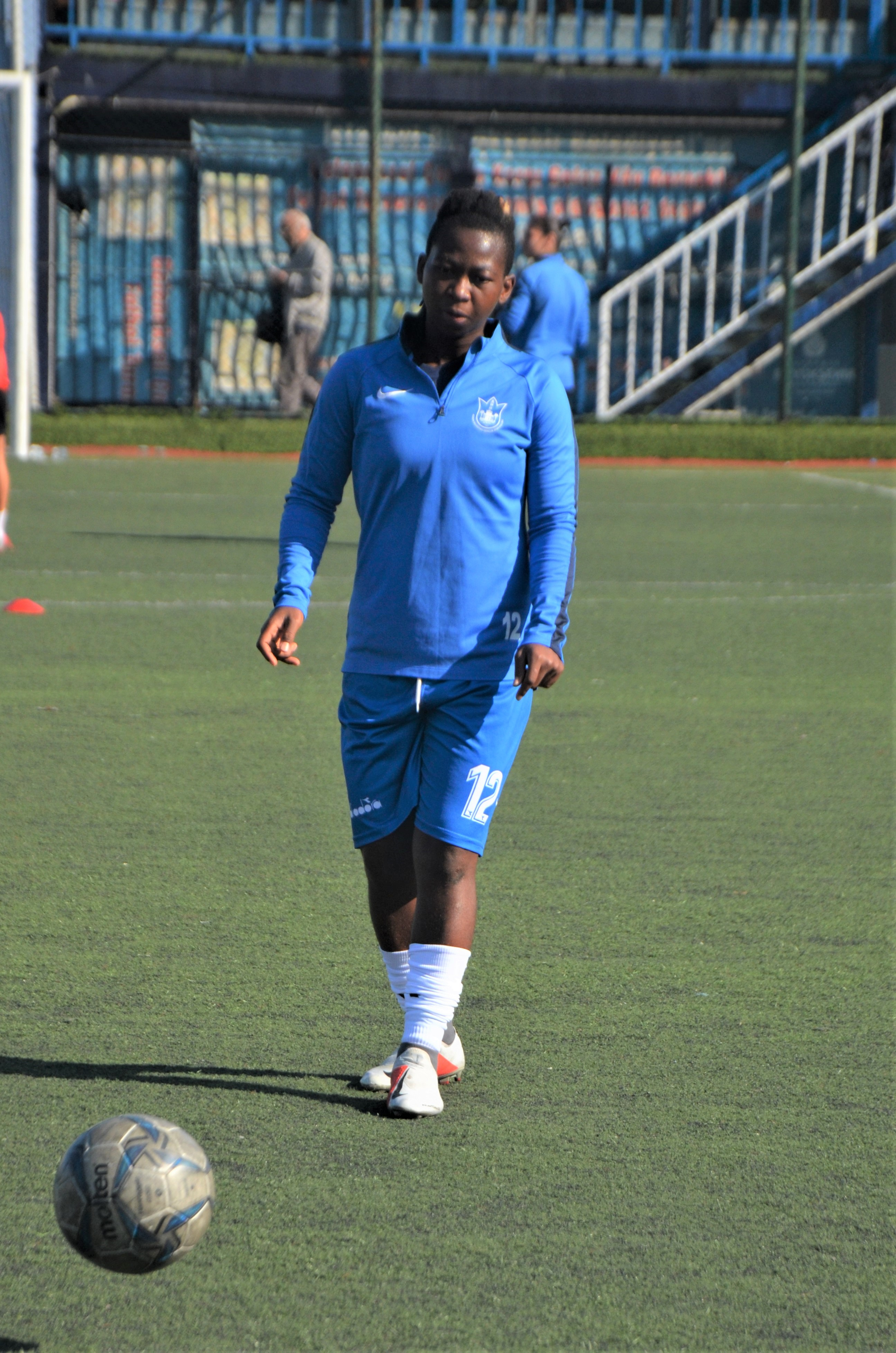
- Bokiri of Konak Belediyespor (November 2019)

Personal information
- Full name: Joy Ebinemiere Bokiri
- Date of birth: 29 December 1998 (age 27)
- Place of birth: Elemebiri, Nigeria
- Height: 1.53 m (5 ft 0 in)
- Position: Midfielder

Team information
- Current team: Ünye Kadın
- Number: 34

Senior career*
Years	Team	Apps	(Gls)
- Bayelsa Queens
2018	Sporting de Huelva	13	(1)
2018–2019	Elpides Karditsas		
2019–2020	Konak Belediyespor	14	(11)
2021	Bayelsa Queens		
2021	AIK	4	(0)
2022	Bayelsa Queens		
2022–2023	Saint-Étienne	5	(1)
2023	Ataşehir Bld.	4	(0)
2024–	Ünye Kadın	18	(3)

International career^{‡}
2019–	Nigeria	1	(1)
- * Club domestic league appearances and goals as of 4 May 2025 ‡ National team caps and goals as of 11 May 2019

Joy Ebinemiere Bokiri (born 29 December 1998) is a Nigerian women's football midfielder who plays in the Turkish Super League for Ünye Kadın and the Nigeria women's national team.

== Club career ==
Bokiri was a member of Bayelsa Queens in the Nigeria Women Premier League. She previously played for Sporting de Huelva in Spain, and Elpides Karditsas in Greece.

In mid-October 2019, she moved to Turkey to play in the top-flight Turkish First League for Konak Belediyespor in İzmir. In the 2023-24 Turkish Super League season, she played for Ataşehir. The next season, she transferred to the newly-promoted club Ünye Kadın in the Turkish Super League.

== International career ==
At national level, Bokiri represented Nigeria at underage competitions, before making her debut for the senior team. At the 2019 WAFU Zone B Women's Cup, Bokiri scored a goal in Nigeria's victory over Niger.
