= Juliane Gathrat =

French footballer (born 1996)

Personal information
- Date of birth: 24 August 1996 (age 30)
- Place of birth: Hennebont, France
- Height: 1.60 m (5 ft 3 in)
- Position: Midfielder

Youth career
- 2005–2006: RS Magny
- 2006–2008: ES Troyes AC
- 2008–2011: RS Magny

Senior career*
Years	Team	Apps	(Gls)
2011-2012	Woippy	2	(0)
2012–2014	AS Algrange	29	(3)
2014–2017	Metz	52	(5)
2017–2019	Bordeaux	32	(3)
2019–2020	Nantes	14	(2)
2020–2022	Nice	19	(3)

International career
2012	France U16	6	(0)
2012-2013	France U17	10	(0)
2015	France U20	10	(1)
2016	France U20	7	(1)
2016	France U23	7	(1)
- * Club domestic league appearances and goals

Juliane Gathrat (born 27 March 1996), is a former French professional footballer who played as a midfielder.

== Honours ==
=== International ===
- France U17
  - 2012 FIFA U-17 Women's World Cup winner in Azerbaijan, 2012
