= Marie-Charlotte Léger =

French footballer (born 1996)

Personal information
- Full name: Marie-Charlotte Léger
- Date of birth: 13 March 1996 (age 30)
- Place of birth: Abbeville, France
- Height: 1.66 m (5 ft 5 in)
- Position: Forward

Team information
- Current team: Marseille
- Number: 18

Youth career
- 2002–2009: AC Fressenneville
- 2009–2012: SC Abbeville

Senior career*
Years	Team	Apps	(Gls)
2012–2014	Hénin-Beaumont	28	(13)
2014–2015	Metz	20	(8)
2015–2018	Montpellier	50	(19)
2018–2019	Fleury	20	(6)
2019–2021	Montpellier	17	(4)
2021–2022	Soyaux	26	(3)
2022–2024	Guingamp	33	(3)
2024–	Marseille	14	(8)

International career
2012	France U16	6	(3)
2012–2013	France U17	7	(3)
2013–2015	France U19	18	(14)
2016	France U20	8	(1)
2019	France U23	7	(3)
2015–2018	France	9	(1)
- * Club domestic league appearances and goals as of 13 April 2025

Marie-Charlotte Léger (born 13 March 1996) is a French footballer who plays as a forward for Seconde Ligue club Marseille.

== Career ==
In June 2015, Léger was announced at Montpellier.

On 3 July 2018, Léger was loaned to Fleury.

On 8 January 2021, Léger was announced at Soyaux. She made her league debut against Paris FC on 16 January 2021. Léger scored her first league goal against Dijon on 23 January 2021, scoring a penalty in the 61st minute.

On 25 July 2022, Léger was announced at Guingamp on a two-year contract. She made her league debut against Fleury on 10 September 2022. Léger scored her first league goal against Fleury on 16 September 2023, scoring in the 49th minute.

On 25 July 2024, Léger was announced at Marseille.

== International career ==
Marie-Charlotte Léger represented France at youth level from 2012.

Léger made her senior international debut on 19 September 2015 in a friendly match against Brazil as a substitute in the 92nd minute. She scored her first international goal against Nigeria on 6 April 2018, scoring in the 90th+3rd minute.

Léger was part of the France squad at the 2016 SheBelieves Cup and the 2018 SheBelieves Cup.

== Career statistics ==
=== International ===
As of match played April 2018

Appearances and goals by national team and year
National team	Year	Apps	Goals
France	2015	2	0
France	2016	4	0
France	2018	3	1
Total		9	1

== Honours ==
Hénin-Beaumont

- Division 2 Féminine Winner: 2013
