= Sweden women's national under-19 football team =

Women's national under-19 association football team representing Sweden

Sweden Women's U-19
- Association: Swedish Football Association
- Confederation: UEFA (Europe)
- Head coach: Caroline Sjöblom
- Captain: Athinna Persson Lundgren
- FIFA code: SWE
First colours	Second colours

First international
- Sweden 8–0 Ukraine (23 September 1997)

Biggest win
- Sweden 19–0 Lithuania (1997)

Biggest defeat
- Norway 5–0 Sweden (25 July 2013); France 5–0 Sweden (27 February 2024); France 6–1 Sweden (22 February 2025); Sweden 0–5 Poland (21 June 2025)

UEFA Women's Under-19 Championship
- Appearances: 13 (first in 1998)
- Best result: Champions (1999, 2012, 2015)

FIFA U-20 Women's World Cup
- Appearances: 2 (first in 2010)
- Best result: Quarter finals (2010)

Sweden women's national under-19 football team is the football team representing Sweden in competitions for under-19 year old players and is controlled by the Swedish Football Association. Their best achievement is winning the 1999, 2012 and 2015 UEFA Women's Under-19 Championship.

== Competitive record ==
=== FIFA U-20 Women's World Cup ===
FIFA U-20 Women's World Cup record
Year	Host	Round	Pos	Pld	W	D*	L	GF	GA
2002	Canada	did not qualify							
2004	Thailand	did not qualify							
2006	Russia	did not qualify							
2008	Chile	did not qualify							
2010	Germany	Quarter-finals	6th	4	2	1	1	6	6
2012	Japan	did not qualify							
2014	Canada	did not qualify							
2016	Papua New Guinea	Group stage	10th	3	1	1	1	7	3
2018	France	did not qualify							
~~2020~~	~~Costa Rica Panama~~	Cancelled due to COVID-19 pandemic							
2022	Costa Rica	did not qualify							
2024	Colombia	did not qualify							
2026	Poland	did not qualify							
Total	2/12 Tournaments	Best: Quarter-finals	—	7	3	2	2	13	9
Champions Runners-up Third place Fourth place *Draws include knockout matches decided on penalty kicks. **Red border colour indicates tournament was held on home soil. ***The first two editions (2002–2004) were held as under-19 championships.

=== UEFA Women's Under-19 Championship ===
The first four editions (1998–2001) were held as under-18 championships. As of 2022, the Swedish team has participated in three UEFA Women's Under-18 Championships, having won one title in 1999, and ten UEFA Women's Under-19 Championships, having won two titles: the first in 2012 and the second in 2015.

UEFA Women's Under-19 Championship record
Year	Host	Round	Pos	Pld	W	D*	L	GF	GA
1998	Multiple	Semi-finals	3rd	4	3	0	1	7	2
1999	Sweden	Champions	1st	3	2	0	1	4	4
2000	France	Group stage	3rd	3	1	1	1	3	4
2001	Norway	did not qualify							
2002	Sweden	Group stage	8th	3	0	1	2	0	2
2003	Germany	Semi-finals	4th	4	1	2	1	8	8
2004	Finland	did not qualify							
2005	Hungary	did not qualify							
2006	Switzerland	Group stage	5th	3	0	3	0	1	1
2007	Iceland	did not qualify							
2008	France	Semi-finals	4th	4	1	2	1	4	7
2009	Belarus	Runners-up	2nd	5	3	0	2	9	9
2010	North Macedonia	did not qualify							
2011	Italy	did not qualify							
2012	Turkey	Champions	1st	5	4	1	0	10	2
2013	Wales	Group stage	7th	3	0	1	2	1	8
2014	Norway	Group stage	5th	3	1	0	2	3	4
2015	Israel	Champions	1st	5	3	1	1	10	5
2016	Slovakia	did not qualify							
2017	Northern Ireland	did not qualify							
2018	Switzerland	did not qualify							
2019	Scotland	did not qualify							
~~2020~~	~~Georgia~~	Cancelled due to COVID-19 pandemic							
~~2021~~	~~Belarus~~	Cancelled due to COVID-19 pandemic							
2022	Czech Republic	Semi-finals	3rd	4	2	0	2	3	2
2023	Belgium	did not qualify							
2024	Lithuania	did not qualify							
2025	Poland	Group Stage	8th	3	0	0	3	0	9
2026	Bosnia and Herzegovina	Semi-finals	3rd	4	2	0	2	6	5
2027	Hungary	TBD							
Total	13/26 Tournaments	3 Titles	—	56	23	12	21	69	72
Champions Runners-up Third place Fourth place *Draws include knockout matches decided on penalty kicks. **Red border colour indicates tournament was held on home soil. ***The first four editions (1998–2001) were held as under-18 championships.

=== Invitational competitions ===
- Albena Cup: won in 1992, 1995 (2)

== Current squad ==
The following 24 players were named to the 2022 season squad. The 20 players with designated numbers were selected to represent Sweden at the 2022 UEFA Women's Under-19 Championship in June 2022.

Head coach: Caroline Sjöblom

No.	Pos.	Player	Date of birth (age)	Club
1	GK	Serina Iddrisu Backmark	21 April 2003 (age 23)	(Swedish Football Association) AIK
12	GK	Elvira Björklund	20 January 2004 (age 22)	(Swedish Football Association) Djurgårdens IF
2	DF	Elma Junttila Nelhage	21 May 2003 (age 23)	(Swedish Football Association) BK Häcken
3	DF	Athinna Persson Lundgren (captain)	3 April 2003 (age 23)	(Swedish Football Association) FC Rosengård
4	DF	Sofia Reidy	15 March 2004 (age 22)	(Swedish Football Association) Jitex Mölndal BK
5	DF	Anna Sandberg	23 May 2003 (age 23)	(Swedish Football Association) KIF Örebro
6	DF	Hanna Wijk	15 December 2003 (age 22)	(Swedish Football Association) BK Häcken
15	DF	Evelina Duljan	12 May 2003 (age 23)	(Swedish Football Association) Kristianstads DFF
16	DF	Lisa Löwing	14 September 2004 (age 22)	(Swedish Football Association) BK Häcken
—	DF	Linnea Folkow	23 May 2004 (age 22)	(Swedish Football Association) Jitex Mölndal BK
7	MF	Emilia Pelgander	3 March 2004 (age 22)	(Swedish Football Association) KIF Örebro
8	MF	Sara Eriksson	9 June 2003 (age 23)	(Swedish Football Association) Hammarby IF
11	MF	Emilia Bengtsson	20 June 2003 (age 23)	(Swedish Football Association) IF Brommapojkarna
13	MF	Matilda Vinberg (vice-captain)	16 March 2003 (age 23)	(Swedish Football Association) Hammarby IF
14	MF	Alma Öberg	9 May 2003 (age 23)	(Swedish Football Association) Alingsås FC United
17	MF	Lisa Björk	11 June 2004 (age 22)	(Swedish Football Association) Umeå IK
18	MF	Felicia Jastré Högberg	1 October 2003 (age 23)	(Swedish Football Association) Jitex Mölndal BK
—	MF	Nesrin Akgün	31 December 2004 (age 21)	(Swedish Football Association) Växjö DFF
—	MF	Johanna Svedberg	13 July 2003 (age 23)	(Swedish Football Association) Linköping FC
9	FW	Svea Rehnberg	21 June 2004 (age 22)	(Swedish Football Association) Mallbackens IF
10	FW	Bea Sprung	30 January 2005 (age 21)	(Swedish Football Association) FC Rosengård
19	FW	Matilda Nildén	10 November 2004 (age 21)	(Swedish Football Association) AIK
20	FW	Wilma Leidhammar	16 June 2003 (age 23)	(Swedish Football Association) IFK Norrköping DFK
—	FW	Ellen Wangerheim	1 September 2004 (age 22)	(Swedish Football Association) Hammarby IF

=== Head coaches history ===
- Marika Domanski Lyfors (1991–1993)
- Pia Sundhage (199?–2000)
- Anna Signeul (2001–2004)
- Calle Barrling (2005–2017)
- Anneli Andersén (2016)
- Anders Johansson (2018–2020)
- Caroline Sjöblom (2021–present)

== Head-to-head record ==
The following table shows Sweden's head-to-head record in the FIFA U-20 Women's World Cup.

Opponent	Pld	W	D	L	GF	GA	GD	Win %
Brazil	2	0	2	0	2	2	+0	0.00
Colombia	1	0	0	1	0	2	−2	0.00
New Zealand	1	1	0	0	2	1	+1	100.00
North Korea	2	1	0	1	3	4	−1	50.00
Papua New Guinea	1	1	0	0	6	0	+6	100.00
Total	7	3	2	2	13	9	+4	42.86

== See also ==
- Sweden women's national football team
- Sweden women's national under-17 football team
- Sweden women's national under-23 football team
- FIFA U-20 Women's World Cup
