= Football at the 2014 Central American and Caribbean Games – Women's team squads =

The following is a list of squads for each nation competing in football at the 2014 Central American and Caribbean Games in Veracruz.

== Group A ==
=== Mexico ===
Head coach: Leonardo Cuéllar

No.	Pos.	Player	Date of birth (age)	Caps	Goals	Club
	GK	Cecilia Santiago	19 October 1994 (aged 20)			(United States Soccer Federation) Kansas City
	DF	Greta Espinoza	5 June 1995 (aged 19)			(United States Soccer Federation) Arizona Western College
	DF	Christina Murillo	28 January 1993 (aged 21)			(United States Soccer Federation) Michigan Wolverines
	DF	Arianna Romero	29 July 1992 (aged 22)			(United States Soccer Federation) Houston Dash
	DF	Bianca Sierra	25 June 1992 (aged 22)			(United States Soccer Federation) Boston Breakers
	DF	Paulina Solís	13 March 1996 (aged 18)			(Mexican Football Federation)
	MF	Dinora Garza	24 January 1988 (aged 26)			(Mexican Football Federation)
	MF	Natalia Gómez Junco	9 October 1992 (aged 22)			(United States Soccer Federation) LSU Tigers
	MF	Stephany Mayor	23 September 1991 (aged 23)			(Mexican Football Federation)
	MF	Liliana Mercado	22 October 1988 (aged 26)			(Mexican Football Federation)
	MF	Karla Nieto	9 January 1995 (aged 19)			(Mexican Football Federation)
	MF	Teresa Noyola	15 April 1990 (aged 24)			(United States Soccer Federation) Houston Dash
	MF	Verónica Pérez	18 May 1988 (aged 26)			(United States Soccer Federation) Washington Spirit
	MF	Nayeli Rangel	28 February 1992 (aged 22)			(Mexican Football Federation)
	FW	Charlyn Corral	11 September 1991 (aged 23)			(Football Association of Finland) Merilappi United
	FW	Maribel Domínguez	18 November 1978 (aged 36)			(Mexican Football Federation)
	FW	Carolina Jaramillo	19 March 1994 (aged 20)			(Mexican Football Federation)
	FW	Mónica Ocampo	4 January 1987 (aged 27)			(United States Soccer Federation) Sky Blue FC

=== Haiti ===
No.	Pos.	Player	Date of birth (age)	Caps	Goals	Club
	GK	Cynthia Chéry	3 September 1994 (aged 20)	1	0	
	GK	Géralda Saintilus	10 December 1985 (aged 28)			
	DF	Clorène Rateau	18 January 1993 (aged 21)			
	DF	Roselord Borgella	1 April 1993 (aged 21)			
	DF	Marie Yves Dina Jean Pierre	14 January 1990 (aged 24)			
	DF	Shanna Hudson	6 August 1985 (aged 29)			
	MF	Sindy Jeune	13 April 1994 (aged 20)			
	MF	Manoucheka Pierre Louis	24 June 1989 (aged 25)			
	MF	Samantha Brand	16 June 1988 (aged 26)			
	MF	Woodlyne Robuste	25 April 1992 (aged 22)			
	MF	Kensia Destinvil	27 September 1997 (aged 17)			
	MF	Zila Lafleur	2 March 1997 (aged 17)	0	0	
	MF	Batcheba Louis	15 June 1997 (aged 17)			
	FW	Yvrase Gerville	20 November 1993 (aged 21)			
	FW	Kimberly Boulos	16 April 1987 (aged 27)			
	FW	Lindsay Zullo	3 May 1991 (aged 23)			
	FW	Nérilia Mondésir	17 January 1999 (aged 15)			

=== Trinidad and Tobago ===
No.	Pos.	Player	Date of birth (age)	Caps	Goals	Club
	GK	Tenesha Palmer	16 September 1994 (aged 20)			Unknown
	DF	Anastacia Prescott	27 June 1987 (aged 27)			Unknown
	DF	Patrice Vincent	10 April 1993 (aged 21)			Unknown
	DF	Jonelle Warrick	11 December 1993 (aged 20)			Unknown
	DF	Shanelle Arjoon	6 May 1997 (aged 17)			Unknown
	MF	Iyesha Ollivierre	3 July 1990 (aged 24)			Unknown
	MF	Taylor Mims	16 January 1991 (aged 23)			Unknown
	MF	Patrice Campbell	2 July 1994 (aged 20)			Unknown
	MF	Danielle Findley	14 August 1994 (aged 20)			Unknown
	MF	Abishai Guy				Unknown
	MF	Renee Mike				Unknown
	MF	Chelcy Ralph				Unknown
	MF	Kenya Charles				Unknown
	MF	Sherine Scott				Unknown
	FW	Natasha St. Louis	1 November 1991 (aged 23)			Unknown
	FW	Jo Marie Lewis	11 December 1993 (aged 20)			Unknown
	FW	Kennya Cordner	18 November 1988 (aged 26)			(United States Soccer Federation) Seattle Sounders
	FW	Candace Edwards	16 November 1988 (aged 26)			Unknown
	FW	Raenah Campbell				Unknown

=== Colombia ===
Head coach: Fabián Taborda

No.	Pos.	Player	Date of birth (age)	Caps	Goals	Club
	GK	Stefany Castaño	11 January 1994 (aged 20)			Unattached
	GK	Sandra Sepúlveda	3 March 1988 (aged 26)			(Colombian Football Federation) Club Formas Íntimas
	DF	Carolina Arias	2 September 1990 (aged 24)			(Colombian Football Federation) Generaciones Palmiranas
	DF	Nataly Arias	2 April 1986 (aged 28)			(United States Soccer Federation) Atlanta SilverBacks
	DF	Ángela Clavijo	1 September 1993 (aged 21)			(Colombian Football Federation) Club Kasamat
	DF	Isabella Echeverri	16 June 1994 (aged 20)			(United States Soccer Federation) Toledo Rockets
	MF	Lady Andrade	10 January 1992 (aged 22)			(Colombian Football Federation) Club Formas Íntimas
	MF	Tatiana Ariza	21 February 1991 (aged 23)			(Colombian Football Federation) Club Gol Star
	MF	Natalia Gaitán	3 April 1991 (aged 23)			(Colombian Football Federation) Club Gol Star
	MF	Daniela Montoya	22 August 1990 (aged 24)			(Colombian Football Federation) Club Formas Íntimas
	MF	Diana Ospina	3 March 1989 (aged 25)			(Colombian Football Federation) Club Formas Íntimas
	MF	Mildrey Pineda	1 October 1989 (aged 25)			(Colombian Football Federation) Generaciones Palmiranas
	MF	Yoreli Rincón	27 July 1993 (aged 21)			(United States Soccer Federation) New York Flash
	MF	Leicy Santos	16 May 1996 (aged 18)			(Colombian Football Federation) Club Besser
	FW	Katerin Castro	21 November 1991 (aged 23)			(Swiss Football Association) Club Alno
	FW	Melissa Ortiz	24 January 1990 (aged 24)			(United States Soccer Federation) Boston Breakers
	FW	Oriánica Velásquez	1 August 1989 (aged 25)			(Colombian Football Federation) Club Gol Star
	FW	Ingrid Vidal	22 April 1991 (aged 23)			(Colombian Football Federation) Generaciones Palmiranas

== Group B ==
=== Costa Rica ===
Head coach: (Uruguay) Garabet Avedissian

No.	Pos.	Player	Date of birth (age)	Caps	Goals	Club
	GK	Noelia Bermúdez	20 September 1994 (aged 20)			(Costa Rican Football Federation) Herediano
	GK	Dinnia Díaz	14 January 1988 (aged 26)			(Costa Rican Football Federation) Moravia
	GK	Yolian Salas	7 April 1997 (aged 17)	0	0	(Costa Rican Football Federation) Moravia
	DF	Diana Sáenz	15 April 1989 (aged 25)			(United States Soccer Federation) South Florida Bulls
	DF	Mariana Benavides	26 December 1994 (aged 19)			(Costa Rican Football Federation) Herediano
	DF	Carol Sánchez	16 April 1986 (aged 28)			(Costa Rican Football Federation) Moravia
	DF	Gabriela Guillén	1 March 1992 (aged 22)			(Costa Rican Football Federation) Saprissa
	DF	Daniela Cruz	8 March 1991 (aged 23)			(Costa Rican Football Federation) Saprissa
	DF	Lixy Rodríguez	4 November 1990 (aged 24)			(Costa Rican Football Federation) UCEM Alajuela
	MF	María Barrantes	12 April 1989 (aged 25)			(Costa Rican Football Federation) Moravia
	MF	Katherine Alvarado	11 April 1991 (aged 23)			(Costa Rican Football Federation) Saprissa
	MF	Yesmi Rodríguez	12 April 1994 (aged 20)	2	0	(Costa Rican Football Federation) Moravia
	MF	Cristín Granados	19 August 1989 (aged 25)			(Costa Rican Football Federation) Saprissa
	MF	Gloriana Villalobos	20 August 1999 (aged 15)			(Costa Rican Football Federation) Saprissa
	MF	Shirley Cruz	28 August 1985 (aged 29)			(French Football Federation) Paris Saint-Germain
	MF	Melissa Herrera	10 October 1996 (aged 18)			(Costa Rican Football Federation) Saprissa
	MF	Viviana Chinchilla	21 December 1994 (aged 19)			(Costa Rican Football Federation) UCEM Alajuela
	FW	Carolina Venegas	28 September 1991 (aged 23)			(Costa Rican Football Federation) Saprissa
	FW	Karla Villalobos	16 July 1986 (aged 28)			(Costa Rican Football Federation) Herediano
	FW	Wendy Acosta	19 December 1989 (aged 24)			(Costa Rican Football Federation) Moravia

=== Nicaragua ===
Head coach: (Spain) Antonio Macías

No.	Pos.	Player	Date of birth (age)	Caps	Goals	Club
	GK	Bethania Aburto	5 February 1990 (aged 24)			(Nicaraguan Football Federation) TBD
	GK	María Galeano	10 July 1989 (aged 25)			(Nicaraguan Football Federation)
	GK	Ángela Gutiérrez	11 March 1990 (aged 24)			(Nicaraguan Football Federation)
	DF	Kelly Ávalos	30 July 1996 (aged 18)			(Nicaraguan Football Federation)
	DF	Alys Cruz	24 February 1998 (aged 16)			(Nicaraguan Football Federation)
	DF	Celeste Escobar	30 April 1993 (aged 21)			(Nicaraguan Football Federation)
	DF	Sheyla Flores	15 May 1998 (aged 16)			(Nicaraguan Football Federation)
	DF	Xaviera Morales	22 September 1988 (aged 26)			(Nicaraguan Football Federation)
	DF	Gema Zúñiga	31 March 1993 (aged 21)			(Nicaraguan Football Federation)
	MF	Julissa Acevedo	7 August 1991 (aged 23)			(Nicaraguan Football Federation)
	MF	Ana Cate	5 August 1991 (aged 23)			(Football Association of Iceland) FH Hafnarfjörður
	MF	Merly Hernández	16 September 1991 (aged 23)			(Nicaraguan Football Federation)
	MF	Fabiola Martínez	16 June 1996 (aged 18)			(Nicaraguan Football Federation)
	MF	Cinthya Orozco	1 January 1994 (aged 20)			(Nicaraguan Football Federation)
	MF	Andrea López	10 February 1995 (aged 19)			(Nicaraguan Football Federation)
	FW	Jansy Aguirre	18 February 1991 (aged 23)			(Nicaraguan Football Federation)
	FW	Josseling Berríos	3 December 1993 (aged 20)			(Nicaraguan Football Federation)
	FW	Yessenia Flores	7 July 1999 (aged 15)			(Nicaraguan Football Federation)
	FW	Virginia Lovo	23 July 1992 (aged 22)			(Nicaraguan Football Federation)
	FW	Ninoska Solís	26 February 1993 (aged 21)			(Nicaraguan Football Federation)

=== Dominican Republic ===
Head coach: Rufino Sotolongo

No.	Pos.	Player	Date of birth (age)	Caps	Goals	Club
	GK	Isairis Minaya	27 October 1992 (aged 22)	1	0	(Dominican Football Federation) SFM
	GK	Yelandy Contreras	25 February 1997 (aged 17)	0	0	(Dominican Football Federation) Bayaguana
	DF	Lissy Sánchez	5 December 1995 (aged 18)	8	0	(Dominican Football Federation) El Seibo
	DF	Ana Odaliza Díaz	27 July 1985 (aged 29)	4	0	(Dominican Football Federation) Bayaguana
	DF	Amanda Rodríguez	4 November 1994 (aged 20)	0	0	(Dominican Football Federation) El Seibo
	DF	Carmen Polanco	19 May 1993 (aged 21)	4	0	(Dominican Football Federation) Mao
	DF	Franyeli Brazobán	27 September 1995 (aged 19)	0	0	(Dominican Football Federation) Bayaguana
	DF	Fiordaliza Beato	21 May 1995 (aged 19)	0	0	(Dominican Football Federation) La Vega
	DF	Denny Vargas	12 August 1990 (aged 24)	8	1	(Dominican Football Federation) Puerto Plata
	DF	Alejandra Constanzo	25 December 1995 (aged 18)	0	0	(Dominican Football Federation) El Seibo
	MF	Evelaynne Alcequiez	3 December 1995 (aged 18)	0	0	(Dominican Football Federation) SFM
	MF	Gabriela Peña	23 August 1995 (aged 19)	2	0	(Dominican Football Federation) Moca
	MF	Winibian Peralta	19 March 1997 (aged 17)	0	0	(Dominican Football Federation) Neyba
	MF	Gabriella Sosa		0	0	(United States Soccer Federation)
	MF	Diana Santana	17 October 1994 (aged 20)	5	0	(Dominican Football Federation) El Seibo
	FW	Loida Michel	12 August 1993 (aged 21)	4	0	(Dominican Football Federation) SPM
	FW	Betzaida Ubri	9 May 1990 (aged 24)	8	4	(Dominican Football Federation) Elias Pina
	FW	Yaqueisi Núñez	19 April 1994 (aged 20)	6	1	(Dominican Football Federation) SPM
	FW	Yaritza Adames	4 October 1993 (aged 21)	0	0	(Dominican Football Federation) SFM

=== Venezuela ===
Head coach: (Panama) Kenneth Zseremeta

No.	Pos.	Player	Date of birth (age)	Caps	Goals	Club
	GK	Maleike Pacheco	20 October 1993 (aged 21)			(Venezuelan Football Federation) Universidad Central
	GK	Franyely Rodríguez	21 September 1997 (aged 17)			(Venezuelan Football Federation) Valencia SC
	DF	Yenifer Giménez	3 May 1996 (aged 18)			(Venezuelan Football Federation) Máximo Viloria
	DF	Sandra Luzardo	18 July 1999 (aged 15)			(Venezuelan Football Federation) Deportivo Lara
	DF	Jaylis Oliveros	13 November 1993 (aged 21)			(Venezuelan Football Federation) Estudiantes de Guárico
	DF	Nubiluz Rangel	13 August 1993 (aged 21)			(Venezuelan Football Federation) La Fría
	DF	Soleidys Rengel	3 December 1993 (aged 20)			(Venezuelan Football Federation) Deportivo Anzoátegui
	DF	Michelle Romero	12 June 1997 (aged 17)			(Venezuelan Football Federation) Aso. Zulia
	DF	Neidy Romero	14 February 1995 (aged 19)			(Venezuelan Football Federation) Universidad Central
	MF	Alexyar Cañas	5 December 1996 (aged 17)			(Venezuelan Football Federation) Deportivo Lara
	MF	Nikol González	29 March 1999 (aged 15)			(Venezuelan Football Federation) AC San Antonio
	MF	Tahicelis Marcano	12 April 1997 (aged 17)			(Venezuelan Football Federation) Deportivo Anzoátegui
	MF	Kika Moreno	25 January 1997 (aged 17)			(Venezuelan Football Federation) Potras FC
	MF	Idalys Pérez	20 July 1996 (aged 18)			(Venezuelan Football Federation) Máximo Viloria
	MF	Daniuska Rodríguez	4 January 1999 (aged 15)			(Venezuelan Football Federation) Seca Sport
	MF	Yosneidy Zambrano	16 May 1997 (aged 17)			(Venezuelan Football Federation) Deportivo Lara
	FW	Leury Basanta	7 April 1993 (aged 21)			(Venezuelan Football Federation) Deportivo Anzoátegui
	FW	Gabriela García	2 April 1997 (aged 17)			(Venezuelan Football Federation) Aso. Sucre
	FW	Yuleisi Rivero	15 January 1999 (aged 15)			(Venezuelan Football Federation) OD Cachimbos FC
