= 2015 South American U-20 Women's Championship =

2015 South American Under-20 Women's Football Championship
Sudamericano Femenino Sub 20 Brasil 2015

Tournament details
- Host country: Brazil
- City: Santos
- Dates: 18 November – 3 December
- Teams: 10 (from 1 confederation)
- Venues: 2 (in 1 host city)

Final positions
- Champions: Brazil (7th title)
- Runners-up: Venezuela
- Third place: Colombia
- Fourth place: Argentina

Tournament statistics
- Matches played: 26
- Goals scored: 78 (3 per match)
- Top scorer: (Argentina) Yamila Rodríguez (6 goals)
- Fair play award: Venezuela

The 2015 South American Under-20 Women's Football Championship was the seventh edition of the South American Under-20 Women's Football Championship, the biennial international youth football championship organised by the CONMEBOL for the women's under-20 national teams of South America. The tournament was held in Santos, Brazil between 18 November and 3 December 2015.

Same as previous editions, the tournament acted as the CONMEBOL qualifiers for the FIFA U-20 Women's World Cup. The top two teams of the tournament qualified for the 2016 FIFA U-20 Women's World Cup in Papua New Guinea as the CONMEBOL representatives.

Brazil were crowned champions and maintained their streak of winning all seven editions so far, and qualified for the World Cup together with runners-up Venezuela, who qualified for the first time.

== Teams ==
All ten CONMEBOL member national teams entered the tournament.

Team	Appearance	Previous best top-4 performance
Argentina	7th	Runners-up (2006, 2008, 2012)
Bolivia	7th	Fourth place (2004, 2014)
Brazil (hosts & holders)	7th	Champions (2004, 2006, 2008, 2010, 2012, 2014)
Chile	7th	Fourth place (2008, 2010)
Colombia	7th	Runners-up (2010)
Ecuador	7th	Third place (2004)
Paraguay	7th	Runners-up (2004, 2014)
Peru	7th	Fourth place (2006)
Uruguay	7th	None
Venezuela	7th	None

== Venues ==
The tournament was played in Santos. The stadiums were Santos's Estádio Urbano Caldeira (Vila Belmiro) and Portuguesa Santista's Estádio Ulrico Mursa (Marapé).

== Squads ==
Players born on or after 1 January 1996 were eligible to compete in the tournament. Each team could register a maximum of 22 players (three of whom must be goalkeepers).

== First stage ==
The draw of the tournament was held on 16 October 2015 during the CONMEBOL Executive Committee meeting at the Hyatt Hotel in Santiago, Chile. The ten teams were drawn into two groups of five teams. Each group contained one team from each of the five "pairing pots": Argentina–Brazil, Colombia–Paraguay, Peru–Uruguay, Chile–Ecuador, Bolivia–Venezuela. The schedule of the tournament was announced on 30 October 2015.

The top two teams of each group advanced to the final stage. The teams were ranked according to points (3 points for a win, 1 point for a draw, 0 points for a loss). If tied on points, tiebreakers would be applied in the following order:

1. Goal difference in all games;
2. Goals scored in all games;
3. Head-to-head result in games between tied teams;
4. Drawing of lots.

All times were local, BRST (UTC−2).

=== Group A ===
Pos	Team	Pld	W	D	L	GF	GA	GD	Pts	Qualification
1	Brazil (H)	4	3	1	0	9	3	+6	10	Final stage
2	Venezuela	4	3	0	1	9	4	+5	9	Final stage
3	Chile	4	2	0	2	6	5	+1	6	
4	Paraguay	4	1	1	2	8	12	−4	4	
5	Peru	4	0	0	4	4	12	−8	0	

Source: CONMEBOL
(H) Hosts
19 November 2015
17:00

Paraguay	3–2	Peru
Bravo 29' (o.g.); Martínez 32'; Godoy 80'	Report	Quesada 15'; Cisneros 19'

Estádio Ulrico Mursa, Santos
Referee: María Victoria Daza (Colombia)
19 November 2015
19:10

Brazil	2–1	Venezuela
Jennifer 50'; Gabriela 90+2' (pen.)	Report	Giménez 68'

Estádio Ulrico Mursa, Santos
Referee: Estela Álvarez (Argentina)

21 November 2015
17:00

Venezuela	4–1	Paraguay
Moreno 25'; García 45+1', 70'; Marcano 90'	Report	Martínez 77'

Estádio Ulrico Mursa, Santos
Referee: Nadia Fuques (Uruguay)
21 November 2015
19:10

Peru	1–2	Chile
Ramos 89'	Report	Ponce 77'; Lara 81'

Estádio Ulrico Mursa, Santos
Referee: Susana Corella (Ecuador)

23 November 2015
17:00

Chile	0–1	Venezuela
	Report	Pérez 78'

Estádio Ulrico Mursa, Santos
Referee: María Victoria Daza (Colombia)
23 November 2015
19:10

Paraguay	2–2	Brazil
Martínez 42'; López 90+3'	Report	Jennifer 48'; Gabriela 64' (pen.)

Estádio Ulrico Mursa, Santos
Referee: Sirley Cornejo (Bolivia)

25 November 2015
17:00

Brazil	1–0	Chile
Gabriela 45'	Report

Estádio Ulrico Mursa, Santos
Referee: Estela Álvarez (Argentina)
25 November 2015
19:10

Venezuela	3–1	Peru
Zambrano 9'; García 45+1'; Cañas 55'	Report	Ramos 77'

Estádio Ulrico Mursa, Santos
Referee: Sirley Cornejo (Bolivia)

27 November 2015
17:00

Chile	4–2	Paraguay
Cristaldo 10' (o.g.); Ponce 28'; Lara 39', 66'	Report	Suafán 13'; Chamorro 90'

Estádio Urbano Caldeira, Santos
Referee: Estela Álvarez (Argentina)
27 November 2015
19:10

Brazil	4–0	Peru
Kélen 17'; Jennifer 29'; Geyse 54', 67'	Report

Estádio Urbano Caldeira, Santos
Referee: Nadia Fuques (Uruguay)

=== Group B ===
Pos	Team	Pld	W	D	L	GF	GA	GD	Pts	Qualification
1	Argentina	4	3	0	1	9	7	+2	9	Final stage
2	Colombia	4	2	1	1	7	2	+5	7	Final stage
3	Ecuador	4	2	1	1	8	4	+4	7	
4	Uruguay	4	1	1	2	5	10	−5	4	
5	Bolivia	4	0	1	3	2	8	−6	1	

Source: CONMEBOL
18 November 2015
16:00

Uruguay	3–2	Ecuador
Farías 33'; Badell 56', 79'	Report	Ponce 52', 85'

Estádio Urbano Caldeira, Santos
Referee: Silvia Reyes (Peru)
18 November 2015
18:10

Argentina	3–1	Bolivia
Rodríguez 15'; Benítez 38'; Cabrera 90+2'	Report	Aguilar 6'

Estádio Urbano Caldeira, Santos
Referee: Yercinia Correa (Venezuela)

20 November 2015
16:00

Bolivia	1–1	Uruguay
Ortiz 68' (pen.)	Report	Badell 7'

Estádio Urbano Caldeira, Santos
Referee: María Belén Carvajal (Chile)
20 November 2015
18:10

Ecuador	0–0	Colombia
	Report

Estádio Urbano Caldeira, Santos
Referee: Regildenia Moura (Brazil)

22 November 2015
16:00

Colombia	2–0	Bolivia
Restrepo 10'; Peñaloza 57'	Report

Estádio Urbano Caldeira, Santos
Referee: Olga Miranda (Paraguay)
22 November 2015
18:10

Uruguay	1–3	Argentina
Millan 81'	Report	Bilos 15'; Rodríguez 30', 45'

Estádio Urbano Caldeira, Santos
Referee: Silvia Reyes (Peru)

24 November 2015
16:00

Bolivia	0–2	Ecuador
	Report	Arreaga 15'; Ponce 71'

Estádio Ulrico Mursa, Santos
Referee: Olga Miranda (Paraguay)
24 November 2015
18:10

Argentina	2–1	Colombia
Correa 24'; Cabrera 60'	Report	Santos 73'

Estádio Ulrico Mursa, Santos
Referee: Regildenia Moura (Brazil)

26 November 2015
16:00

Colombia	4–0	Uruguay
Restrepo 54'; Santos 69' (pen.); Ocampo 77'; Rentería 90+1'	Report

Estádio Urbano Caldeira, Santos
Referee: Yercinia Correa (Venezuela)
26 November 2015
18:10

Ecuador	4–1	Argentina
Ganan 5'; Jácome 25', 90+4'; Real 74'	Report	Cabrera 10'

Estádio Urbano Caldeira, Santos
Referee: María Belén Carvajal (Chile)

== Final stage ==
If teams finished level of points, the final order would be determined according to the same criteria as the first stage, taking into account only matches in the final stage.

This was the first time Venezuela reached the top four in the tournament.

Pos	Team	Pld	W	D	L	GF	GA	GD	Pts	Qualification
1	Brazil (H)	3	1	2	0	3	1	+2	5	2016 FIFA U-20 Women's World Cup
2	Venezuela	3	1	2	0	4	3	+1	5	2016 FIFA U-20 Women's World Cup
3	Colombia	3	0	2	1	1	2	−1	2	
4	Argentina	3	0	2	1	3	5	−2	2	

Source: CONMEBOL
(H) Hosts
29 November 2015
17:00

Argentina	2–2	Venezuela
Rodríguez 82' (pen.), 90+3'	Report	Giménez 35'; Díaz 42'

Estádio Urbano Caldeira, Santos
Referee: Sirley Cornejo (Bolivia)
29 November 2015
19:10

Brazil	0–0	Colombia
	Report

Estádio Urbano Caldeira, Santos
Referee: Olga Miranda (Paraguay)

1 December 2015
17:00

Argentina	0–0	Colombia
	Report

Estádio Urbano Caldeira, Santos
Referee: Susana Corella (Ecuador)
1 December 2015
19:10

Brazil	0–0	Venezuela
	Report

Estádio Urbano Caldeira, Santos
Referee: María Belén Carvajal (Chile)

3 December 2015
17:00

Venezuela	2–1	Colombia
Pérez 63'; Díaz 86'	Report	Ocampo 45'

Estádio Urbano Caldeira, Santos
3 December 2015
19:10

Brazil	3–1	Argentina
Kélen 9'; Jennifer 14'; Marjorie 78'	Report	Rodríguez 90+2'

Estádio Urbano Caldeira, Santos

== Winners ==
2015 South American Under-20 Women's Football Championship

Brazil
Seventh title

== Qualified teams for FIFA U-20 Women's World Cup ==
The following two teams from CONMEBOL qualified for the FIFA U-20 Women's World Cup.

Team	Qualified on	Previous appearances in tournament^{1}
Brazil	3 December 2015	7 (2002, 2004, 2006, 2008, 2010, 2012, 2014)
Venezuela	3 December 2015	0 (Debut)

^{1} Bold indicates champion for that year. Italic indicates host for that year.

== Goalscorers ==
6 goals

- (Argentina) Yamila Rodríguez

4 goals

- (Brazil) Jennifer Westendorf

3 goals

- (Argentina) Micaela Cabrera
- (Brazil) Gabriela Nunes
- (Chile) Paulina Lara
- (Ecuador) Angie Ponce
- (Paraguay) Jessica Martínez
- (Uruguay) Yamila Badell
- (Venezuela) Gabriela García

2 goals

- (Brazil) Geyse Ferreira
- (Brazil) Kélen Bender
- (Chile) Katya Ponce
- (Colombia) Juliana Ocampo
- (Colombia) Valentina Restrepo
- (Colombia) Leicy Santos
- (Ecuador) Mariela Jácome
- (Peru) Alejandra Ramos
- (Venezuela) Vimarest Díaz
- (Venezuela) Yenifer Giménez
- (Venezuela) Idalys Pérez

1 goal

- (Argentina) Lorena Benítez
- (Argentina) Juana Bilos
- (Argentina) Rocío Correa
- (Bolivia) María Aguilar
- (Bolivia) Marcela Ortiz
- (Brazil) Marjorie Castro
- (Colombia) Pamela Peñaloza
- (Colombia) Laura Rentería
- (Ecuador) Maylin Arreaga
- (Ecuador) Diana Ganan
- (Ecuador) Kerlly Real
- (Paraguay) Lice Chamorro
- (Paraguay) Fanny Godoy
- (Paraguay) Griselda López
- (Paraguay) Amara Suafán
- (Peru) Geraldine Cisneros
- (Peru) Carmen Quesada
- (Uruguay) Daiana Farías
- (Uruguay) Ana Laura Millan
- (Venezuela) Alexyar Cañas
- (Venezuela) Tahicelis Marcano
- (Venezuela) Kika Moreno
- (Venezuela) Yosneidy Zambrano

Own goal

- (Paraguay) Laurie Cristaldo (playing against Chile)
- (Peru) Vannia Bravo (playing against Paraguay)
