= Football at the 2013 Bolivarian Games =

Football, for the 2013 Bolivarian Games, took place from 17 November to 25 November 2013. Here, the men's tournament is for the under-18 footballers. The women's tournament is for the under-20 footballers.

== Medal table ==
* Host nation (Peru)

Rank	Nation	Gold	Silver	Bronze	Total
1	Colombia (COL)	2	0	0	2
2	Ecuador (ECU)	0	1	0	1
2	Venezuela (VEN)	0	1	0	1
4	Bolivia (BOL)	0	0	1	1
4	Peru (PER)*	0	0	1	1
Totals (5 entries)		2	2	2	6

== Events ==
Event	Gold	Silver	Bronze
Men's U18	Colombia; Cristian Daniel Arango Duque; Jarlan Junior Barrera Escalona; Alexis Andrés Escudero Castillo; Andrés Felipe Gómez Viracacha; Aldayr Hernández Basanta; Daniel Londoño Castañeda; Jeison Steven Lucumí Mina; Mateo Mendoza Valderrama; Alfredo Jose Morelo Avilés; Luis Manuel Orejuela García; Juan Sebastián Quintero Fletcher; Deinner Alexander Quiñones Quiñones; Rodin Jair Quiñones Rentería; Carlos Enrique Rentería Olaya; Davinson Sánchez Mina; Luis Herney Vásquez Caicedo; Sergio Leonardo Villarreal Ruiz; Alexis Zapata Alvarez	Ecuador; Christian Fernando Alemán Alegría; Erick Leonel Castillo Arroyo; Aníbal Hernán Chalá Ayoví; Gabriel Eduardo Corozo Vásquez; Gabriel Jhon Cortez Casierra; Joffre Andrés Escobar Moyano; Jackson David González Quiñónez; Carlos Armando Gruezo Arvoleda; Jerry Gabriel León Nazareno; Jhegson Sebastián Méndez Carabalí; David Aníbal Mina Valencia; Miguel Enrique Parrales Vera; Daniel Guillermo Porozo Valencia; Edisson Ernesto Recalde Báez; Erick Romualdo Rentería Corozo; Darwin Ernesto Suárez Vélez; Gonzalo Roberto Valle Bustamente; Carlos Enrique Vera Morán	Peru; Luis Alfonso Abram Ugarelli; Pedro Jesús Aquino Sánchez; Dángelo Josué Artiaga Morales; Fernando Alexis Canales Alvarado; Alexis Cossio Zamora; Luiz Humberto Da Silva Silva; Luciano André Da Silva Silva; Renzo Renato Garcés Mori; Carlos Alfonso Grados Heredia; Emmanuel Jesús Paucar Reyes; Sergio Fernando Peña Flores; Aldair Perleche Romero; Luis Enrique Matthae Rivas Salazar; Jeremy Martin Rostaing Verástegui; Kevin Alejandro Ruiz Rosales; Ray Anderson Sandoval Baylon; Alexander Nasim Succar Cañote; Gerson Gustavo Valladares Rodríguez
Women's U20	Colombia; Carolina Arbeláez Castaño; Karen Lorena Balcázar Sainz; Dayana Castillo López; Melissa Cepeda Rodríguez; Ángela Corina Clavijo Silva; Vanesa Córdoba Arteaga; Yulieth Paola Domínguez Ochoa; Diana Carolina Duarte Velandia; Manuela Alexandra González Mendoza; Lina Granados; Dora Alejandra Grisales Bastidas; Angie Carolina Mina Viveros; Jessica Fernanda Peña Banguero; María Alejandra Ramírez Matallana; Hazleydi Yoreli Rincón Torres; Leicy María Santos Herrera; Gabi Yorely Santos Robayo; Diana Patricia Torrente Reina	Venezuela; Neily Judith Carrasquel García; Deyna Cristina Castellanos Naujenis; Meibi Alejandra Mesa Molina; Jessyca Andreína Montes Perales; Lourdes Yaurimar Moreno Beleno; Génesis Gildrey Moreno Sánchez; Jaylis Carolina Oliveros Toledo; Maleike Geraldine Pacheco Álvarez; María Alejandra Peraza Romero; Idalys Yaruma Pérez Hernández; Nubiluz de la Trinidad Rangel Quintero; Soleidys José Rengel Marcano; Claudia Rodríguez Abella; Franyely Sarahí Rodríguez Itanare; Daniuska Isamar Rodríguez Pineda; María Eugenia Rodríguez Ruiz; Marialba José Zambrano Saracual	Bolivia; Blanca Ximena Aliaga Vargas; Ángela Patricia Cárdenas Román; Paola Roxelin Cruz Alvarado; Dulce Cielo Dorado Escalante; Sdenka Avanir Eguez Mauthe; María Laura Gómez Cabello; Carla Patricia Méndez Mendoza; Ana Montero Arimoza; Ericka Morales Alarcón; Marcela Ortiz Montalván; Danny Katherin Pedraza Aveldaño; Yoselin Portales Peralta; Melissa Revollo Trujillo; Ana María Rivera; Helga Elena Scheidel Michel; Flavia Ivana Valdivia Lema; Paola Lorena Vásquez Rodríguez; Yaneth Viveros Campos

== Men's U18 tournament ==
Participating Teams
- Bolivia
- Colombia
- Ecuador
- Guatemala
- Peru
- Venezuela

== Women's U20 tournament ==
Participating Teams
- Bolivia
- Chile
- Colombia
- Dominican Republic
- Ecuador
- Guatemala
- Peru
- Venezuela
