= Carrasquel =

Carrasquel is a surname. Notable people with the surname include:

- Alex Carrasquel (1912–1969), Venezuelan baseball player
- Chico Carrasquel (1926–2005), Venezuelan baseball player
- Domingo Carrasquel (1937–2016), Venezuelan baseball player
- Neily Carrasquel (born 1997), Venezuelan footballer
