= 1944 São Paulo FC season =

São Paulo
1944 season
- Chairman: Décio Pacheco Pedroso
- Manager: Joreca
- Campeonato Paulista: Runners-up

The 1944 football season was São Paulo's 15th season since the club's founding in 1930.

== Overall ==
Games played	39 (20 Campeonato Paulista, 19 Friendly match)
Games won	25 (13 Campeonato Paulista, 12 Friendly match)
Games drawn	7 (3 Campeonato Paulista, 4 Friendly match)
Games lost	7 (4 Campeonato Paulista, 3 Friendly match)
Goals scored	116
Goals conceded	62
Goal difference	+54
Best result	9–1 (H) v Santos - Campeonato Paulista - 1944.06.18
Worst result	0–5 (A) v Peñarol - Friendly match - 1944.12.24
Most appearances	
Top scorer	

Source: São Paulo FC

== Friendlies ==
February 12 Olímpiada Tricolor	São Paulo	2–0	Fluminense	São Paulo
	Goal			Stadium: Estádio Paulo Machado de Carvalho (Pacaembu)

February 16 National	São Paulo	5–1	São Paulo Railway	São Paulo
	Goal		Goal	Stadium: Estádio Paulo Machado de Carvalho (Pacaembu)

March 1 Taça Cidade de São Paulo	Palmeiras	1–2	São Paulo	São Paulo
	Goal		Goal	Stadium: Estádio Paulo Machado de Carvalho (Pacaembu)

March 8 Taça Cidade de São Paulo	Corinthians	2–3	São Paulo	São Paulo
	Goal		Goal	Stadium: Estádio Paulo Machado de Carvalho (Pacaembu)

March 15 National	São Paulo	4–2	Portuguesa Santista	São Paulo
	Goal		Goal	Stadium: Estádio Paulo Machado de Carvalho (Pacaembu)

May 1 National	São Paulo	3–3	Vasco da Gama	São Paulo
	Goal		Goal	Stadium: Estádio Paulo Machado de Carvalho (Pacaembu)

May 4 National	São Paulo	2–2	Atlético Mineiro	São Paulo
	Goal		Goal	Stadium: Estádio Paulo Machado de Carvalho (Pacaembu)

May 13 National	São Paulo	2–1	Comercial	São Paulo
	Goal		Goal	Stadium: Estádio Paulo Machado de Carvalho (Pacaembu)

August 9 National	São Paulo	2–0	Fluminense	São Paulo
	Goal			Stadium: Estádio Paulo Machado de Carvalho (Pacaembu)

August 24 National	São Paulo	3–1	Ypiranga	São Paulo
	Goal		Goal	Stadium: Estádio Paulo Machado de Carvalho (Pacaembu)

October 4 National	Canto do Rio	1–1	São Paulo	Niterói
	Goal		Goal	Stadium: Estádio Caio Martins

October 21 National	São Paulo	2–1	Santos	São Paulo
	Goal		Goal	Stadium: Estádio Paulo Machado de Carvalho (Pacaembu)

October 25 National	Santos	1–2	São Paulo	Santos
	Goal		Goal	Stadium: Estádio Urbano Caldeira (Vila Belmiro)

November 1 National	São Paulo	2–2	Botafogo	São Paulo
	Goal		Goal	Stadium: Estádio Paulo Machado de Carvalho (Pacaembu)

November 15 National	São Paulo	8–2	Juventus	São Paulo
	Goal		Goal	Stadium: Estádio Conde Rodolfo Crespi (Rua Javari)

November 17 National	São Paulo	3–0	Canto do Rio	São Paulo
	Goal			Stadium: Estádio Paulo Machado de Carvalho (Pacaembu)

December 8 National	São Paulo	0–2	Comercial	São Paulo
			Goal	Stadium: Estádio Paulo Machado de Carvalho (Pacaembu)

December 20 Montevideo Int. Tournament	Nacional (Uruguay)	3–1	(Brazil) São Paulo	Montevideo
	Goal		Goal	Stadium: Estadio Centenario

December 24 Montevideo Int. Tournament	Peñarol (Uruguay)	5–0	(Brazil) São Paulo	Montevideo
	Goal			Stadium: Estadio Centenario

== Official competitions ==
=== Campeonato Paulista ===
March 26 1	Portuguesa	1–1	São Paulo	São Paulo
	Goal		Goal	Stadium: Estádio Paulo Machado de Carvalho (Pacaembu)

April 1 2	São Paulo Railway	2–8	São Paulo	São Paulo
	Goal		Goal	Stadium: Estádio Paulo Machado de Carvalho (Pacaembu)

April 8 3	Ypiranga	1–0	São Paulo	São Paulo
	Goal			Stadium: Estádio Paulo Machado de Carvalho (Pacaembu)

April 16 4	São Paulo	1–0	Comercial	São Paulo
	Goal			Stadium: Estádio Paulo Machado de Carvalho (Pacaembu)

April 21 5	São Paulo	6–2	Jabaquara	São Paulo
	Goal		Goal	Stadium: Estádio Paulo Machado de Carvalho (Pacaembu)

May 28 6	Portuguesa Santista	4–7	São Paulo	Santos
	Goal		Goal	Stadium: Estádio Ulrico Mursa

June 4 7	Palmeiras	3–3	São Paulo	São Paulo
	Goal		Goal	Stadium: Estádio Paulo Machado de Carvalho (Pacaembu)

June 11 8	São Paulo	1–0	Juventus	São Paulo
	Goal			Stadium: Estádio Paulo Machado de Carvalho (Pacaembu)

June 18 9	São Paulo	9–1	Santos	São Paulo
	Goal		Goal	Stadium: Estádio Paulo Machado de Carvalho (Pacaembu)

July 2 10	São Paulo	0–1	Corinthians	São Paulo
			Goal	Stadium: Estádio Paulo Machado de Carvalho (Pacaembu)

July 9 11	Jabaquara	3–2	São Paulo	Santos
	Goal		Goal	Stadium: Estádio Ulrico Mursa

July 16 12	São Paulo	4–1	Portuguesa	São Paulo
	Goal		Goal	Stadium: Estádio Paulo Machado de Carvalho (Pacaembu)

July 22 13	São Paulo	3–3	Portuguesa Santista	São Paulo
	Goal		Goal	Stadium: Estádio Paulo Machado de Carvalho (Pacaembu)

August 6 14	Santos	0–1	São Paulo	Santos
			Goal	Stadium: Estádio Urbano Caldeira (Vila Belmiro)

August 13 15	São Paulo	3–1	Ypiranga	São Paulo
	Goal		Goal	Stadium: Estádio Paulo Machado de Carvalho (Pacaembu)

August 19 16	Juventus	3–4	São Paulo	São Paulo
	Goal		Goal	Stadium: Estádio Paulo Machado de Carvalho (Pacaembu)

September 3 17	São Paulo	5–2	Comercial	São Paulo
	Goal		Goal	Stadium: Estádio Paulo Machado de Carvalho (Pacaembu)

September 17 18	São Paulo	1–3	Palmeiras	São Paulo
	Goal		Goal	Stadium: Estádio Paulo Machado de Carvalho (Pacaembu)

September 23 19	São Paulo	6–1	São Paulo Railway	São Paulo
	Goal		Goal	Stadium: Estádio Paulo Machado de Carvalho (Pacaembu)

October 15 20	São Paulo	4–0	Corinthians	São Paulo
	Goal			Stadium: Estádio Paulo Machado de Carvalho (Pacaembu)

==== Record ====
Final Position	Points	Matches	Wins	Draws	Losses	Goals For	Goals Away	Win%
2nd	29	20	13	3	4	69	32	72%
