= 2013 South American U-17 Women's Championship =

2013 South American Under-17 Women's Championship
Sudamericano Femenino Sub 17

Tournament details
- Host country: Paraguay
- Dates: 12–29 September
- Teams: 10 (from 1 confederation)
- Venues: 2 (in 2 host cities)

Final positions
- Champions: Venezuela (1st title)
- Runners-up: Colombia
- Third place: Paraguay
- Fourth place: Chile

Tournament statistics
- Matches played: 26
- Goals scored: 83 (3.19 per match)
- Top scorer: (Venezuela) Gabriela García (8 goals)

The 2013 South American Under-17 Women's Football Championship is the fourth instance of the South American Under-17 Women's Football Championship. It was played from 12 to 29 September in Paraguay. The top three teams qualified to the 2014 FIFA U-17 Women's World Cup to be held in Costa Rica. The tournament was won by Venezuela, winning their first title.

The tournament was originally scheduled from 7 to 25 August but rescheduled in July 2013.

== Participating teams ==
All ten nations of CONMEBOL participated.

- Argentina
- Bolivia
- Brazil (holders)
- Chile
- Colombia
- Ecuador
- Paraguay (hosts)
- Peru
- Uruguay
- Venezuela

== Venues ==
City	Stadium	Capacity
Luque	Estadio Feliciano Cáceres	25,000
Asunción	Estadio Emiliano Ghezzi	8,000

== Group stage ==
The group stage draw was held on 2 August 2013. Paraguay as hosts and Brazil as champions were fixed as heading groups A and B.

If teams finish level on points, order will be determined according to the following criteria:

1. superior goal difference in all matches
2. greater number of goals scored in all group matches
3. better result in matches between tied teams
4. drawing of lots

All match times are in local Paraguay Time (UTC−03:00).

=== Group A ===
Venue: Estadio Emiliano Ghezzi, Asunción

Team	Pld	W	D	L	GF	GA	GD	Pts	Status
Paraguay	4	4	0	0	13	1	+12	12	Advance to playoff round
Chile	4	2	1	1	6	3	+3	7	Advance to playoff round
Bolivia	4	1	1	2	2	7	−5	4	Eliminated
Argentina	4	0	3	1	4	6	−2	3	Eliminated
Peru	4	0	1	3	2	10	−8	1	Eliminated

12 September 2013
14:00

Argentina	1–1	Chile
Cabrera 90'	Report	Maturana 23'

Referee: Regildenia Moura (Brazil)
12 September 2013
16:00

Paraguay	6–0	Peru
J. Martínez 9', 23', 31', 45'; Magali Brizuela 71'; Alonso 75'	Report

Referee: Alejandra Trucidos (Uruguay)

14 September 2013
14:00

Peru	0–1	Bolivia
	Report	Méndez 56'

Referee: Susana Corella (Ecuador)
14 September 2013
16:00

Paraguay	3–1	Argentina
Evelyn Vera 48'; Sheryl Barrios 54'; Jennifer González 65'	Report	M. Benítez 40'

Referee: Yeimi Martinez (Colombia)

16 September 2013
16:00

Peru	1–2	Chile
Arévalo 35'	Report	Barbara Alvarez 11'; Nicole González 71'

Referee: Yercinia Correa (Venezuela)
16 September 2013
18:00

Paraguay	3–0	Bolivia
Godoy 57'; Evelyn Vera 73'; J. Martínez 89'	Report

Referee: Regildenia Moura (Brazil)

18 September 2013
14:00

Chile	3–0	Bolivia
Nicole González 24', 39'; Barbara Alvarez 76'	Report

Referee: Yeimi Martinez (Colombia)
18 September 2013
16:00

Argentina	1–1	Peru
Ivana Hernández 58'	Report	Martínez 68'

Referee: Susana Corella (Ecuador)

20 September 2013
14:00

Argentina	1–1	Bolivia
L. Benítez 11'	Report	Ana Arimoza 44'

Referee: Yercinia Correa (Venezuela)
20 September 2013
16:00

Paraguay	1–0	Chile
J. Martinez 89'	Report

Referee: Alejandra Trucidos (Uruguay)

=== Group B ===
Venue: Estadio Feliciano Cáceres, Luque

Team	Pld	W	D	L	GF	GA	GD	Pts	Status
Venezuela	4	3	1	0	12	4	+8	10	Advance to playoff round
Colombia	4	3	0	1	8	4	+4	9	Advance to playoff round
Brazil	4	2	1	1	7	4	+3	7	Eliminated
Ecuador	4	0	1	3	3	10	−7	1	Eliminated
Uruguay	4	0	1	3	4	12	−8	1	Eliminated

13 September 2013
14:00

Uruguay	1–1	Ecuador
Romina Alanis 65'	Report	Hidalgo Trullo 84'

Referee: Olga Miranda (Paraguay)
13 September 2013
16:00

Brazil	0–1	Colombia
	Report	Asprilla 49'

Referee: Sirley Cornejo (Bolivia)

15 September 2013
16:00

Brazil	4–2	Uruguay
Vitória 21', 80'; Katielle 74'; Vanessa 76'	Report	Millán Ferreira 5', 67'

Referee: Melany Bermejo (Peru)
15 September 2013
18:00

Colombia	1–3	Venezuela
Valentina Carvajal 40'	Report	Zambrano 5', 75'; García 12'

Referee: Maria Laura Fortunato (Argentina)

17 September 2013
16:00

Colombia	2–0	Ecuador
Valentina Betancourt 5', 29'	Report

Referee: Jacqueline Vargas (Chile)
17 September 2013
18:00

Brazil	1–1	Venezuela
Marjorie 29'	Report	Castellanos 35'

Referee: Olga Miranda (Paraguay)

19 September 2013
14:00

Ecuador	2–5	Venezuela
Hidalgo Trullo 48'; Paulina Pillajo 58'	Report	García 20', 55'; Castellanos 35'; D. Rodriguez 63'; Moreno 67'

Referee: Melany Bermejo (Peru)
19 September 2013
16:00

Uruguay	1–4	Colombia
Andrea Cabrera 75'	Report	Castañeda 5', 70'; Andrea Rodriguez 72'; Aylin Quiñones 79'

Referee: Sirley Cornejo (Bolivia)

21 September 2013
14:00

Uruguay	0–3	Venezuela
	Report	Tregartten 31' (o.g.); García 57', 59'

Referee: Jacqueline Vargas (Chile)
21 September 2013
16:00

Brazil	2–0	Ecuador
Marjorie 30'; Julia 64'	Report

Referee: Maria Laura Fortunato (Argentina)

== Final round ==
The top two teams of each group play another round-robin. Venezuela, Colombia and Paraguay qualified to the 2014 FIFA U-17 Women's World Cup in Costa Rica.

Pos	Team	Pld	W	D	L	GF	GA	GD	Pts	Qualification
1	Venezuela	3	3	0	0	12	3	+9	9	2014 FIFA U-17 Women's World Cup
2	Colombia	3	1	1	1	4	3	+1	4	2014 FIFA U-17 Women's World Cup
3	Paraguay (H)	3	1	1	1	4	9	−5	4	2014 FIFA U-17 Women's World Cup
4	Chile	3	0	0	3	2	7	−5	0	

(H) Hosts
23 September 2013
16:00

Venezuela	3–1	Chile
García 13'; Zambrano 65', 75'	Report	Barbara Alvarez 39'

Estadio Emiliano Ghezzi, Asunción
Referee: Maria Laura Fortunato (Argentina)
23 September 2013
18:15

Paraguay	1–1	Colombia
Magali Brizuela 27'	Report	Valentina Betancourt 85'

Estadio Emiliano Ghezzi, Asunción
Referee: Regildenia Moura (Brazil)

26 September 2013
16:00

Colombia	1–2	Venezuela
Castañeda 17'	Report	Adrianyi Pineda 68'; Luzardo 86'

Estadio Emiliano Ghezzi, Asunción
Referee: Alejandra Trucidos (Uruguay)
26 September 2013
18:15

Paraguay	2–1	Chile
Sheryl Barrios 67'; Andrea Yubi 73'	Report	Barbara Alvarez 15'

Estadio Emiliano Ghezzi, Asunción
Referee: Susana Corella (Ecuador)

29 September 2013
16:00

Chile	0–2	Colombia
	Report	Angie Rodriguez 33'; María Hurtado 49'

Estadio Emiliano Ghezzi, Asunción
Referee: Regildenia Moura (Brazil)
29 September 2013
18:15

Paraguay	1–7	Venezuela
Torres 79'	Report	Moreno 31', 49'; Zambrano 35'; D. Rodríguez 42', 76'; García 60', 89'

Estadio Emiliano Ghezzi, Asunción
Referee: Sirley Cornejo (Bolivia)

== Champions ==
2013 Women's Under-17 South American champions

Venezuela
First title

== Top scorers ==
8 goals

- (Venezuela) Gabriela Garcia

6 goals

- (Paraguay) Jessica Martínez

5 goals

- (Venezuela) Yosneidy Zambrano

4 goals

- (Chile) Bárbara Álvarez

3 goals

- (Chile) Nicole González
- (Colombia) Valentina Restrepo
- (Colombia) Angie Castañeda
- (Venezuela) Kika Moreno
- (Venezuela) Daniuska Rodríguez
