= Dionisio Acosta =

Venezuelan baseball player (1929–2013)

- Catcher
- Born: March 20, 1929; Maracaibo, Zulia, Venezuela
- Died: January 16, 2013 (aged 83); Cabudare, Lara, Venezuela
- Batted: Right Threw: Right

Member of the Venezuelan

Baseball Hall of Fame
- Induction: 2016

Dionisio Arcenio Acosta (March 20, 1929 – January 16, 2013) was a Venezuelan professional baseball catcher and activist. He played in Minor League Baseball and in the Mexican Baseball League (LMB), as well as the Venezuelan Professional Baseball League (LVBP). He is best known for his role in leading the Venezuelan Professional Baseball Players Association, which earned him induction into the.

== Career ==
Acosta played in the Baltimore Orioles farm system in the 1950s, as well as with the Havana Sugar Kings of the Triple-A international League; in 1963, he played with the Tigres del Mexico. In thirteen winter league seasons in the LVBP, he played with Navegantes del Magallanes, Leones del Caracas, Licoreros de Pampero, Indios de Oriente, and Tiburones de La Guaira. He participated in 279 games, posting a career batting average of .220 with 171 hits.

After retiring as a baseball player in 1967, he led the (AUPPV), He held the position for 24 years and led the second player's strike in Venezuelan history, which resulted in the suspension of the 1973–74 LVBP postseason. Acosta, along with Domingo Carrasquel, pushed for the establishment of an LVBP All-Star Game to fund the players' union, ensuring that it had enough income to guarantee pensions for its oldest members. He also became the president of Confederation of Professional Baseball Players of the Caribbean, or Conpeproca, which represented professional ballplayers in other Caribbean winter leagues.

Acoasta was inducted into the Venezuelan Baseball Hall of Fame in 2016, and into the Caribbean Baseball Hall of Fame in 2020.

== See also ==
- Marvin Miller, first executive director of the Major League Baseball Players Association (MLBPA)
