= Minaya (disambiguation) =

Minaya is a municipality in Albacete, Castile-La Mancha, Spain.

Minaya may also refer to:

- Isairis Minaya, (born 1992), Dominican football manager, former footballer
- Joiri Minaya, (born 1990), American multidisciplinary artist
- Juan Minaya, (born 1991), Dominican professional baseball player
- Juan Minaya Molano, (born 1941), Colombian chess player
- Leo Minaya, American film actor
- Leo Perez Minaya, American businessman and engineer
- Leopoldo Minaya, (born 1963), Dominican-American poet
- Omar Minaya, (born 1958), Dominican baseball executive and general manager of the New York Mets
