= Alejandra Ramos =

Alejandra Ramos may refer to:

- Alejandra Ramos (runner)
- Alejandra Ramos (footballer)
