= Yosneidy Zambrano =

Venezuelan footballer (born 1997)

Personal information
- Full name: Yosneidy Evangelista Zambrano Mujica
- Date of birth: 16 May 1997 (age 29)
- Place of birth: Maracay, Venezuela
- Height: 1.64 m (5 ft 5 in)
- Positions: Forward; midfielder

Team information
- Current team: Ñañas
- Number: 7

Senior career*
Years	Team	Apps	(Gls)
–2016	Deportivo Lara		
2017	Aurillac Arpajon	7	(3)
2017	Deportivo Lara		
2017–2019	Ñañas	23	(22)
2019	Joventut Almassora		
2019–	Ñañas	24	(17)

International career^{‡}
2013–2014	Venezuela U17	9+	(6)
2015–2016	Venezuela U20	4+	(1)
2014	Venezuela	2	(0)
- * Club domestic league appearances and goals as of 28 September 2019 ‡ National team caps and goals as of 21 November 2019

Yosneidy Evangelista “Lala” Zambrano Mujica (born 16 May 1997) is a Venezuelan footballer who plays as a forward for Ecuadorian club Ñañas. She has been a member of the Venezuela women's national team.

== International career ==
Zambrano represented Venezuela at the 2013 South American U-17 Women's Championship, the 2014 FIFA U-17 Women's World Cup, the 2015 South American U-20 Women's Championship and the 2016 FIFA U-20 Women's World Cup. At senior level, she played the 2014 Central American and Caribbean Games.
