= Alexyar Cañas =

Venezuelan footballer (born 1996)

Personal information
- Full name: Alexyar Carolina Cañas García
- Date of birth: 5 December 1996 (age 29)
- Place of birth: Caracas, Venezuela
- Height: 1.73 m (5 ft 8 in)
- Positions: Midfielder; defender

Team information
- Current team: Barcelona SC

Senior career*
Years	Team	Apps	(Gls)
2013–2016	Deportivo Lara		
2017	América de Cali		
2017	Zamora		
2018	Santa Teresa	0	(0)
2018	Cortuluá		
2019–	Barcelona SC	19	(9)
- Carneras UPS

International career^{‡}
2015–2016	Venezuela U20	4+	(1)
2014	Venezuela	4	(2)
- * Club domestic league appearances and goals as of 12 September 2019 ‡ National team caps and goals as of 13 April 2018

Alexyar Carolina Cañas García (born 5 December 1996) is a Venezuelan footballer who plays as a midfielder for Ecuadorian Super Liga Femenina club Carneras UPS. She was a member of the Venezuela women's national team.

== Club career ==
Cañas is a former player of Zamora FC. She signed for Cortuluá in September 2018.

== International career ==
Cañas represented Venezuela at the 2015 South American U-20 Women's Championship and the 2016 FIFA U-20 Women's World Cup. At senior level, she played the 2014 Central American and Caribbean Games. She was also selected for the 2018 Copa América Femenina, but did not play.

=== International goals ===
Scores and results list Venezuela's goal tally first

No.	Date	Venue	Opponent	Score	Result	Competition
1	18 November 2014	Estadio Unidad Deportiva Hugo Sánchez, Veracruz, Mexico	Costa Rica	1–0	1–2	2014 Central American and Caribbean Games
2	20 November 2014	Estadio Unidad Deportiva Hugo Sánchez, Veracruz, Mexico	Dominican Republic	2–0	6–2	2014 Central American and Caribbean Games
