= Paola Cruz =

Bolivian footballer and futsal player (born 1995)

Personal information
- Full name: Paola Roxelin Cruz Alvarado
- Date of birth: 8 August 1995 (age 31)
- Position: Right back

International career^{‡}
Years	Team	Apps	(Gls)
2013–2014	Bolivia U20		
2014	Bolivia	1	(0)
2018	Bolivia (futsal)	1	(1)
- ‡ National team caps and goals as of 12 March 2014

Paola Roxelin Cruz Alvarado (born 8 August 1995) is a Bolivian futsal player and a footballer who plays as a right back. She has been a member of the Bolivia women's national team.

== International career ==
Cruz represented Bolivia at the 2013 Bolivarian Games and the 2014 South American U-20 Women's Championship. At senior level, she played the 2014 South American Games.
