= Soleidys Rengel =

Venezuelan footballer (born 1993)

Personal information
- Full name: Soleidys José Rengel Marcano
- Date of birth: 3 December 1993 (age 32)
- Place of birth: Maturín, Venezuela
- Height: 1.74 m (5 ft 9 in)
- Positions: Right back; centre back

Team information
- Current team: Monagas

Senior career*
Years	Team	Apps	(Gls)
- Atlético Piar
- Deportivo Anzoátegui
- Cortuluá
- Monagas

International career^{‡}
2010	Venezuela U17	3	(0)
2010–	Venezuela	10	(0)
- * Club domestic league appearances and goals ‡ National team caps and goals as of 4 October 2019

Soleidys José Rengel Marcano (born 3 December 1993) is a Venezuelan footballer who plays as a defender for Monagas SC and the Venezuela women's national team.

== International career ==
Rengel represented Venezuela at the 2010 FIFA U-17 Women's World Cup. At senior level, she played two Copa América Femenina editions (2010 and 2014) and two Central American and Caribbean Games editions (2014 and 2018).
