= Carmen Quesada =

Peruvian footballer (born 1996)

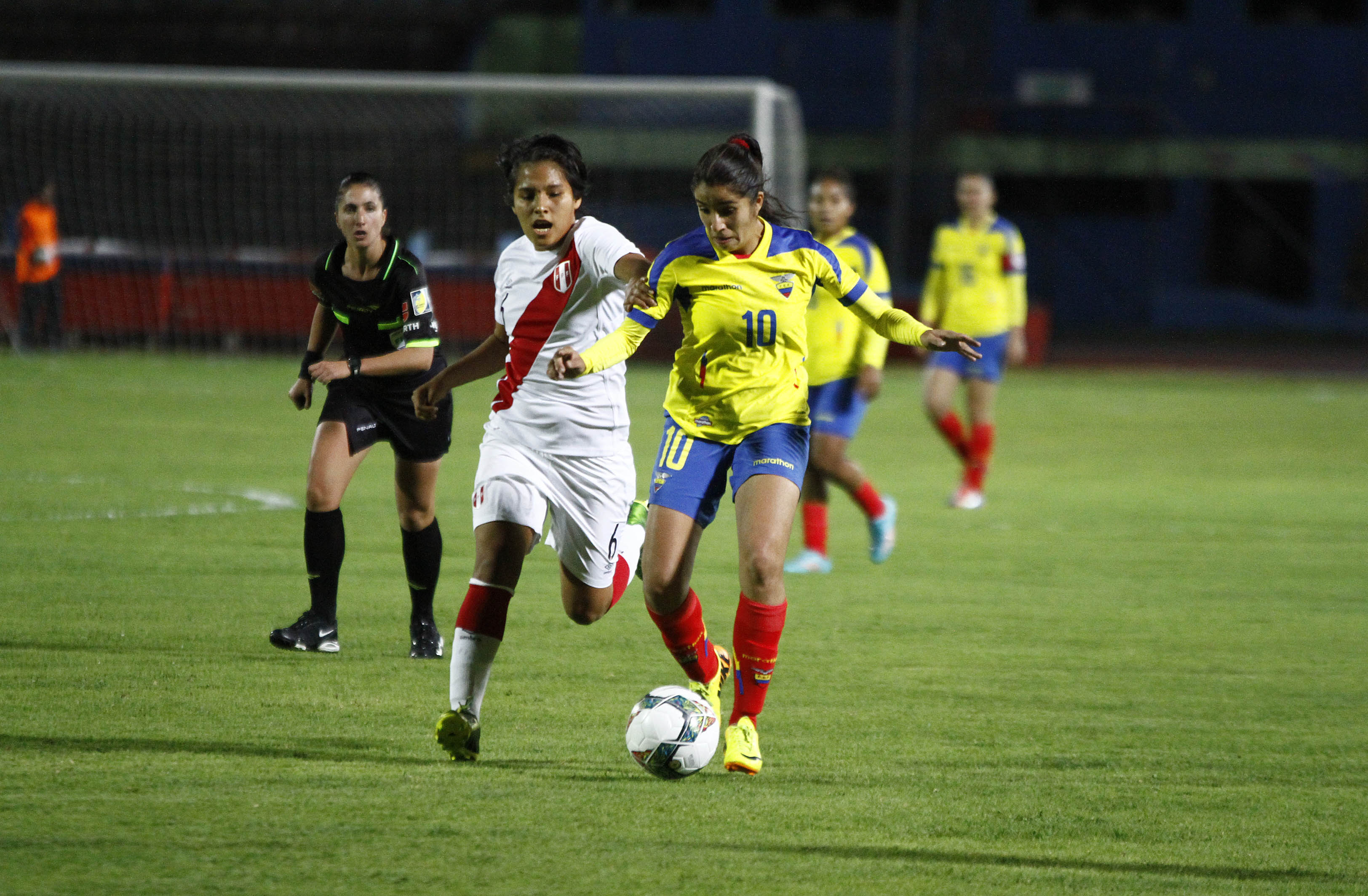
- Quesada playing for Peru during the 2014 Copa América Femenina

Personal information
- Full name: Carmen Rosa Quesada Campos
- Date of birth: 12 March 1996 (age 30)
- Height: 1.65 m (5 ft 5 in)
- Position: Defensive midfielder

Team information
- Current team: Municipalidad de Majes
- Number: 6

Senior career*
Years	Team	Apps	(Gls)
- Universitario
- Sport Girls
- Municipalidad de Majes

International career^{‡}
2012	Peru U17	1+	(1)
2014–2015	Peru U20	1+	(1)
2014–	Peru	4	(0)
- * Club domestic league appearances and goals ‡ National team caps and goals as of 20 September 2014

Carmen Rosa Quesada Campos (born 12 March 1996) is a Peruvian footballer who plays as a defensive midfielder for Municipalidad de Majes and the Peru women's national team.

== Club career ==
Quesada is a former player of Club Universitario de Deportes.

== International career ==
Quesada represented Peru at the 2012 South American U-17 Women's Championship and two South American U-20 Women's Championship editions (2014 and 2015). At senior level, she played the 2014 Copa América Femenina.
