= Idalys Pérez =

Venezuelan footballer (born 1996)

Personal information
- Full name: Idalys Yaruma Pérez Hernández
- Date of birth: 20 July 1996 (age 30)
- Place of birth: San Felipe, Yaracuy, Venezuela
- Height: 1.71 m (5 ft 7 in)
- Positions: Attacking midfielder; right winger

Team information
- Current team: Independiente del Valle

Senior career*
Years	Team	Apps	(Gls)
- Atlético Yara
- América de Cali
- Cortuluá
2019–	Independiente del Valle	17	(6)

International career^{‡}
2012	Venezuela U17	2+	(2)
2014–2016	Venezuela U20	6+	(3)
2014–2018	Venezuela	3	(0)
- * Club domestic league appearances and goals as of 9 August 2019 ‡ National team caps and goals as of 13 April 2018

Idalys Yaruma Pérez Hernández (born 20 July 1996) is a Venezuelan footballer who plays as a midfielder for Ecuadorian club CSD Independiente del Valle. She was a member of the Venezuela women's national team.

== International career ==
Pérez represented Venezuela at the 2012 South American U-17 Women's Championship, two South American U-20 Women's Championship editions (2014 and 2015) and the 2016 FIFA U-20 Women's World Cup. At senior level, she played two Copa América Femenina editions (2014 and 2018) and the 2014 Central American and Caribbean Games.
