= Ricardo Belli =

Brazilian football manager (born 1986)

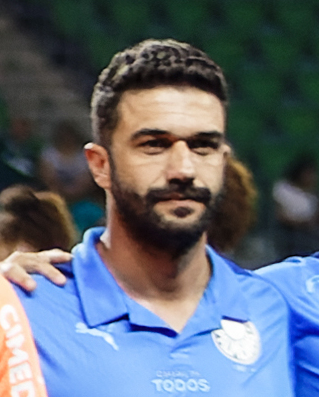
- Belli with Palmeiras (women) in 2023

Personal information
- Full name: Ricardo José Belli
- Date of birth: 10 September 1986 (age 40)
- Place of birth: Vinhedo, Brazil

Team information
- Current team: Venezuela (women) (manager)

Managerial career
- Years: Team
- 2010: Paulista (assistant)
- 2013: Guaçuano U20
- 2013: Rio Branco-SP U20
- 2013–2014: Académica de Coimbra U19 (assistant)
- 2014–2016: SL Marinha U19
- 2017: Atibaia U20
- 2017: Paulista U20
- 2018: Betinense (assistant)
- 2019: Villa Nova (assistant)
- 2019: Palmeiras U18 (women)
- 2019–2021: Palmeiras (women)
- 2022: Ituano U20
- 2022–2023: Palmeiras (women)
- 2024–2025: Toluca (women)
- 2025–: Venezuela (women)

Ricardo José Belli (born 10 September 1986) is a Brazilian football manager who is currently in charge of the Venezuela women's national team.

== Career ==
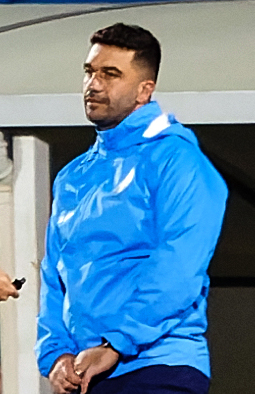
Belli with Palmeiras (women) in 2022

Born in Vinhedo but raised in Louveira, both in the São Paulo state, Belli began his career as a fitness coach in the youth sides of Santos. In 2010, he spent a short period as an assistant of Fernando Diniz at Paulista, before spending the following year back in his hometown working in a social project sponsored by Umbro.

In November 2012, Belli was named the under-20 manager of Guaçuano. The following February, he took over the under-20 side of Rio Branco-SP, before moving to Portugal in July and spending a period in the youth sides of Académica de Coimbra.

In August 2014, Belli was named manager of the under-19 side of Sport Lisboa e Marinha. He returned to his home country in 2016, and took over the under-20s of Atibaia in November of that year.

Belli returned to Paulista in March 2017, now as manager of the under-20 team. He then worked as an assistant manager at Betinense and Villa Nova, before joining the women's team of Palmeiras, initially for the under-18 team.

On 24 July 2019, Belli was named manager of the women's team of Verdão. He departed the club on 9 November 2021, and later returned to men's football after being in charge of the under-20 side of Ituano.

Belli returned to Palmeiras and its women's team on 16 July 2022.

On 19 February 2025, Belli was named head coach for the Venezuela women's national team.

== Honours ==
Palmeiras

- Copa Paulista de Futebol Feminino: 2019, 2021
- Copa Libertadores Femenina: 2022
- Campeonato Paulista de Futebol Feminino: 2022
