= Leury Basanta =

Venezuelan footballer (born 1993)

Personal information
- Full name: Leury Isabel Basanta Gil
- Date of birth: 7 April 1993 (age 33)
- Place of birth: Ciudad Bolívar, Venezuela
- Height: 1.65 m (5 ft 5 in)
- Positions: Midfielder; forward

Team information
- Current team: América de Cali

Senior career*
Years	Team	Apps	(Gls)
2010–2013	Caracas		
2013	→ Estudiantes de Guárico (loan)		
2014–2016	Deportivo Anzoátegui		
2017	Estudiantes de Guárico		
2018	Atlético Bucaramanga		
2019	LALA		
2020–	América de Cali		

International career^{‡}
2014	Venezuela	4	(1)
- * Club domestic league appearances and goals ‡ National team caps and goals as of 25 November 2014

Leury Isabel Basanta Gil (born 7 April 1993) is a Venezuelan footballer who plays as a midfielder for Colombian club América de Cali. She has been a member of the Venezuela women's national team.

== International career ==
Basanta played for Venezuela at senior level in the 2014 Copa América Femenina and the 2014 Central American and Caribbean Games.

=== International goals ===
Scores and results list Venezuela's goal tally first

No.	Date	Venue	Opponent	Score	Result	Competition
1	20 November 2014	Estadio Unidad Deportiva Hugo Sánchez, Veracruz, Mexico	Dominican Republic	3–1	6–2	2014 Central American and Caribbean Games
