= Franyely Rodríguez =

Venezuelan footballer (born 1997)

Personal information
- Full name: Franyely Sarahí Rodríguez Itanare
- Date of birth: 21 September 1997 (age 29)
- Place of birth: Guacara, Venezuela
- Height: 1.65 m (5 ft 5 in)
- Position: Goalkeeper

Senior career*
| Years | Team | Apps | (Gls) |
- Valencia SC
- Carabobo
- Flor de Patria
- Atlético Bucaramanga

International career^{‡}
| 2014 | Venezuela U17 | 5 | (0) |
| 2016 | Venezuela U20 | 3 | (0) |
| 2014 | Venezuela | 2 | (0) |
- * Club domestic league appearances and goals ‡ National team caps and goals as of 21 November 2019

Franyely Sarahí Rodríguez Itanare (born 21 September 1997) is a Venezuelan footballer who plays as a goalkeeper. She has been a member of the Venezuela women's national team.

In 2023, Rodríguez announced her retirement and she was forced to flee her country as part of the Venezuelan refugee crisis, crossing the Darién Gap into Panama. She reached the United States on 11 July and settled in Phoenix, where she found work as a hairdresser.

== International career ==
Rodríguez represented Venezuela at the 2014 FIFA U-17 Women's World Cup and the 2016 FIFA U-20 Women's World Cup. At senior level, she was part of the squad for the 2014 Copa América Femenina, but did not play. She played two matches in 2014 Central American and Caribbean Games.
