= Neily Carrasquel =

Venezuelan footballer (born 1997)

Personal information
- Full name: Neily Judith Carrasquel García
- Date of birth: 26 July 1997 (age 29)
- Place of birth: Caracas, Venezuela
- Height: 1.65 m (5 ft 5 in)
- Positions: Defensive midfielder; centre back

Team information
- Current team: Atlético Venezuela

Senior career*
Years	Team	Apps	(Gls)
–2017	Deportivo La Guaira		
2018	Junior		
2019	Monagas		
2019	Libertad/Limpeño		
2020–	Atlético Venezuela		

International career^{‡}
2013–2016	Venezuela U20	3	(0)
2018–	Venezuela	5	(0)
- * Club domestic league appearances and goals ‡ National team caps and goals as of 21 July 2018

Neily Judith Carrasquel García (born 26 July 1997) is a female Venezuelan footballer who plays as a defensive midfielder for Atlético Venezuela CF and the Venezuela women's national team.

== Club career ==
Carrasquel is a former player of Deportivo La Guaira FC.

== International career ==
Carrasquel represented Venezuela at the 2013 Bolivarian Games and the 2016 FIFA U-20 Women's World Cup. At senior level, she played the 2018 Copa América Femenina and the 2018 Central American and Caribbean Games.
