= Yenifer Giménez =

Venezuelan footballer (born 1996)

Personal information
- Full name: Yenifer Yuliet Giménez Gamboa
- Date of birth: 3 May 1996 (age 30)
- Place of birth: Barquisimeto, Venezuela
- Height: 1.71 m (5 ft 7 in)
- Positions: Centre back; defensive midfielder

Team information
- Current team: Cruzeiro

Senior career*
Years	Team	Apps	(Gls)
- Máximo Viloria
- Deportivo Lara
2017	América de Cali		
2018	Aurillac Arpajon	7	(0)
2018–2019	CSFA Ambilly	20	(0)
2019–2020	Thonon Évian	8	(0)
2020–2024	Villarreal	64	(0)
2024–2026	Servette	27	(1)
2026–	Cruzeiro	6	(0)

International career^{‡}
2015–2016	Venezuela U20	4+	(2)
2014–	Venezuela	22	(0)
Medal record
Women's football
Representing Venezuela
Central American and Caribbean Games
Silver medal – second place	2023 San Salvador
- * Club domestic league appearances and goals as of 30 April 2023 ‡ National team caps and goals as of 23 July 2018

Yenifer Yuliet Giménez Gamboa (born 3 May 1996) is a Venezuelan professional footballer who plays as a for club Cruzeiro and the Venezuela women's national team.

== International career ==
Giménez represented Venezuela at the 2015 South American U-20 Women's Championship and the 2016 FIFA U-20 Women's World Cup. At senior level, she played two Copa América Femenina editions (2014 and 2018) and two Central American and Caribbean Games editions (2014 and 2018).
