= Maleike Pacheco =

Venezuelan footballer (born 1993)

Personal information
- Full name: Maleike Geraldine Pacheco Álvarez
- Date of birth: 20 October 1993 (age 33)
- Place of birth: Caracas, Venezuela
- Height: 1.77 m (5 ft 10 in)
- Position: Goalkeeper

Team information
- Current team: Barcelona SC

Senior career*
| Years | Team | Apps | (Gls) |
- UCV
- Rocafuerte FC
- Wave FC
- Ñañas
- Cortuluá
| 2019– | Barcelona SC | 21 | (1) |

International career^{‡}
| 2010 | Venezuela U17 | 3 | (0) |
| 2013 | Venezuela U20 | | |
| 2014 | Venezuela | 6 | (0) |
- * Club domestic league appearances and goals ‡ National team caps and goals as of 4 October 2019

Maleike Geraldine Pacheco Álvarez (born 20 October 1993) is a Venezuelan footballer who plays as a defender for Ecuadorian club Barcelona SC and the Venezuela women's national team.

== International career ==
Pacheco represented Venezuela at the 2010 FIFA U-17 Women's World Cup. At senior level, she played the 2014 Copa América Femenina and the 2014 Central American and Caribbean Games. She was also a part of the roster for the 2018 Copa América Femenina, but did not play.
