= Shanna Hudson =

Haitian footballer (born 1985)

Personal information
- Full name: Shanna Nicole Hudson
- Date of birth: 6 August 1985 (age 41)
- Place of birth: Venice, California, United States
- Height: 1.75 m (5 ft 9 in)
- Positions: Defender; central midfielder

Youth career
- –2002: Palisades Charter High School

College career
Years	Team	Apps	(Gls)
2003	USC Trojans	1	(0)
2006–2007	Cal State Northridge Matadors		

Senior career*
Years	Team	Apps	(Gls)
2010	LAFC Chelsea		
2011	Los Angeles Premier		
2012	Pali Blues		
2013	Los Angeles Blues		
2015–2016	FC Kibi International University Charme	33	(5)
2017	FC Dallas		

International career^{‡}
2012–2015	Haiti	6	(0)
- * Club domestic league appearances and goals as of 11 August 2016 ‡ National team caps and goals as of 21 November 2014

Shanna Nicole Hudson (born 6 August 1985) is an American-born Haitian former footballer who played as a central midfielder. She has been a member of the Haiti women's national team.

== International career ==
Hudson qualified to play for Haiti through her grandparents. She joined Les Grenadières in 2012 and played the 2014 CONCACAF Women's Championship and the 2014 Central American and Caribbean Games.
