= Palavecino Municipality =

Palavecino Municipality Municipio Palavecino
- Municipality
- Flag Seal

- Location in Lara

- Location in Venezuela
- Coordinates: 9°59′00″N 69°13′48″W
- Country: Venezuela
- State: Lara
- Municipal seat: Cabudare

Government
  - Mayor: Derby Guedez Torres (PSUV)

Area
  - Total: 295.5 km^{2} (114.1 sq mi)

Population (2011)
  - Total: 174,099
  - Density: 589.2/km^{2} (1,526/sq mi)
- Time zone: UTC−4 (VET)
- Area code(s): 0251
- Website: Official website

The Palavecino Municipality is one of the nine municipalities (municipios) that makes up the Venezuelan state of Lara and, according to a 2011 population estimate by the National Institute of Statistics of Venezuela, the municipality has a population of 174,099. The town of Cabudare is the shire town of the Palavecino Municipality.

== Demographics ==
The Palavecino Municipality, according to a 2011 population estimate by the National Institute of Statistics of Venezuela, has a population of 174,099 (up from 155,653 in 2007). This amounts to 9.8% of the state's population. The municipality's population density is 353.76 inhabitants per square kilometre (916.2/sq mi).

== Government ==
The mayor of the Palavecino Municipality is Mirla Vires, elected in 2017 with 64.85% of the vote and 59.23% abstention. The municipality is divided into three parishes; Cabudare, José Gregorio Bastidas, and Agua Viva .

== See also ==
- Cabudare
- Lara
- Municipalities of Venezuela
