= Leidy Asprilla =

Colombian footballer (1997–2019)

Personal information
- Full name: Leidy Johanna Aspirlla Solís
- Date of birth: 18 April 1997
- Date of death: 19 May 2019 (aged 22)
- Place of death: Valle del Cauca, Colombia
- Position: Forward

Senior career*
Years	Team	Apps	(Gls)
- Orsomarso

International career
2013–14	Colombia U17		(1)
2016	Colombia	1	(0)
- * Club domestic league appearances and goals

Leidy Johanna Asprilla Solís (18 April 1997 – 19 May 2019) was a Colombian footballer who played as a forward. She played for the women's team of Orsomarso and also represented Colombia at the under-20 level, earning several caps.

Aspirlla was reported missing on 19 May 2019 while on her way to a training session in Palmira. Her body was found several days later on a nearby highway near her motorcycle. Local police announced that she had died in a traffic accident, rather than a kidnapping or murder as previously assumed.

== International career ==
Aspirlla represented Colombia at several youth tournaments, including the 2014 FIFA U-17 Women's World Cup. At the 2013 South American U-17 Women's Championship, she scored the lone goal against Brazil in a group stage match. She suffered a knee injury in 2016 that kept her out of consideration for the Colombian team, but returned to the under-20 team the following year.

== See also ==
- List of kidnappings
- List of solved missing person cases (post-2000)
