= Iyesha Ollivierre =

Trinidad and Tobago footballer (born 1990)

Personal information
- Date of birth: 3 July 1990 (age 36)
- Height: 1.68 m (5 ft 6 in)
- Positions: Forward; midfielder

Youth career
- Victory Christian Academy

College career
Years	Team	Apps	(Gls)
2008	Youngstown State Penguins	4	(0)
2009–2012	Concordia Clippers	31+	(11+)

International career^{‡}
2009	Trinidad and Tobago U20	3	(0)
2014	Trinidad and Tobago	3	(0)
- ‡ National team caps and goals as of 21 November 2014.

Iyesha Ollivierre (born 3 July 1990) is a US-raised Trinidad and Tobago former footballer who played as a forward and a midfielder. She has been a member of the Trinidad and Tobago women's national team.

== Early life ==
Ollivierre was raised in Medford, New York.

== High school and college career ==
Ollivierre has attended the Victory Christian Academy in East Patchogue, New York, the Youngstown State University in Youngstown, Ohio and the Concordia College in Bronxville, New York.

== International career ==
Ollivierre represented Trinidad and Tobago at the 2010 CONCACAF Women's U-20 Championship qualification. She capped at senior level during the 2014 Central American and Caribbean Games.

== Personal life ==
Ollivierre majored in Business Administration in the Concordia College.
