= Denny Vargas =

Dominican footballer (born 1990)

Personal information
- Date of birth: 12 August 1990 (age 36)
- Place of birth: Puerto Plata, Dominican Republic
- Height: 1.70 m (5 ft 7 in)
- Position: Centre back

Team information
- Current team: Deportivo Claret
- Number: 20

Senior career*
Years	Team	Apps	(Gls)
2008–2015	Barcelona Atlético		
2015	→ Distrito Nacional (loan)		
2016	Estudiantes de Guárico		
2017	La Equidad		
2019	Junqueño		
2019–	Deportivo Claret		

International career^{‡}
	Dominican Republic	35	(5)
- * Club domestic league appearances and goals ‡ National team caps and goals as of 8 October 2019

Denny Vargas (born 12 August 1990) is a Dominican footballer who plays as a centre back and captains both Deportivo Claret and the Dominican Republic women's national team.

== Club career ==
Vargas played for Barcelona Atlético and Distrito Nacional in the Dominican Republic, for Estudiantes de Guárico in Venezuela, for La Equidad in Colombia and for CB Junqueño in Puerto Rico.

== International career ==
Vargas played for the Dominican Republic at senior level in the 2010 CONCACAF Women's World Cup Qualifying qualification, the 2012 CONCACAF Women's Olympic Qualifying Tournament qualification, the 2014 Central American and Caribbean Games and the 2018 CONCACAF Women's Championship qualification and the 2020 CONCACAF Women's Olympic Qualifying Championship qualification.

=== International goals ===
Scores and results list Dominican Republic's goal tally first.

No.	Date	Venue	Opponent	Score	Result	Competition
1	30 March 2010	Estadio Panamericano, San Cristóbal, Dominican Republic	Haiti	1–1	1–2	2010 CONCACAF Women's World Cup Qualifying qualification
2	13 May 2018	Estadio Panamericano, San Cristóbal, Dominican Republic	Aruba	1–0	3–0	2018 CONCACAF Women's Championship qualification
3	13 May 2018	Estadio Panamericano, San Cristóbal, Dominican Republic	Aruba	2–0	3–0	2018 CONCACAF Women's Championship qualification
