= Domingo Carrasquel =

Venezuelan baseball manager

- Shortstop / Manager
- Born: December 1, 1937; Caracas, Venezuela
- Died: September 4, 2016 (aged 78); Barquisimeto, Lara, Venezuela
- Batted: Right Threw: Right

Domingo Eloy Carrasquel Colón (December 1, 1937 — September 4, 2016) was a Venezuelan baseball player, manager, and scout. He played in Minor League Baseball and the Mexican League, and later managed in the Venezuelan Professional Baseball League, leading Cardenales de Lara to its first championship in 1991.

== Playing career ==
Domingo Carrasquel began playing amateur baseball in his youth, with the Policía de Caracas and Tropical de La Guaira clubs. He made his professional baseball debut at the age of 17, during the 1955–56 season with the Leones del Caracas (where his brother, Chico Carrasquel, was already a star player). After just four games, he was traded to the Licoreros de Pampero, where he played five seasons.

He was recruited by the Chicago White Sox organization, playing with the Madisonville Miners, and later moved to the Los Angeles Dodgers. In the Dodgers system, he made it as high as the Triple-A Montreal Royals in 1960, finishing his career with the Single-A Greenville Spinners in 1962. He then moved on to the Mexican League, playing with the Broncos de Reynosa (1963–1964) and Rojos del Águila de Veracruz (1966–1968). With Reynosa in 1963, Carrasquel hit 28 home runs, far surpassing the record for a shortstop previously set by Guillermo Álvarez (18).

In Venezuela, Carrasquel returned to Leones for the 1960–61 season, moving to Navegantes del Magallanes in the 1964–65 season and to Cardenales de Lara in the 1967–68 season, where he finished his playing career in 1971. Over the course of his 15 seasons in the LVBP, he posted a .250 batting average with 470 hits and 171 runs batted in.

== Managerial career ==
After his retirement, Carrasquel stayed involved with the Cardenales de Lara organization. He was hired as manager of Lara for the 1989–90 season, leading the team to the finals, where they were defeated in seven games by the Leones del Caracas. The following year, he again led the team to the finals, this time defeating Caracas in six games.

He managed the Venezuela national baseball team at the 1990 Baseball World Cup, held in the Canadian city of Edmonton. He also piloted the team in its failed bid to qualify for the 1998 Baseball World Cup.

Carrasquel managed in Mexico during the 1993 season, skippering the Industriales de Monterrey. Before the season, he led the team in an exhibition game against the Minnesota Twins at Monterrey's Palacio Sultán (a 9–2 loss).

== Legacy ==
Carrasquel, a scout for the Toronto Blue Jays, was responsible several for signings out of Venezuela, including Luis Sojo, Oswald Peraza, Luis Leal, Tony Castillo, and Fred Manrique.

Along with Venezuelan Baseball Hall of Famer Dionisio Acosta, Carrasquel was one of the creator's of Venezuela's players' union, the Asociación Única de Peloteros (Asopeloteros).

The 2018–19 season of the LVBP was played in honor of Carrasquel.

== Personal life ==
He was the brother of major league shortstop Alfonso "Chico" Carrasquel.
