= Isairis Minaya =

Dominican footballer and manager

Personal information
- Full name: Isairis Isabel Minaya Ramos
- Date of birth: 27 October 1992 (age 34)
- Position: Goalkeeper

International career^{‡}
Years	Team	Apps	(Gls)
2011–2012	Dominican Republic U20	6	(0)
2010–2014	Dominican Republic	4	(0)
- ‡ National team caps and goals as of 2 November 2014

Isairis Isabel Minaya Ramos (born 27 October 1992) is a Dominican football manager and a retired footballer who played as a goalkeeper. She has been a member of the Dominican Republic women's national team.

== Early life ==
Minaya hails from San Francisco de Macorís.

== International career ==
Minaya represented the Dominican Republic at the 2012 CONCACAF Women's U-20 Championship qualifying. At senior level, she capped during the 2010 CONCACAF Women's World Cup Qualifying qualification and the 2014 Central American and Caribbean Games.
