= Marcela Ortiz =

Bolivian footballer (born 1996)

Personal information
- Full name: Marcela Ortiz Montalván
- Date of birth: 23 September 1996 (age 30)
- Position: Midfielder

Senior career*
Years	Team	Apps	(Gls)
- Santa Cruz FC

International career^{‡}
2012	Bolivia U17	1+	(1)
2013–2015	Bolivia U20	2+	(2)
2017–2018	Bolivia	3	(0)
- * Club domestic league appearances and goals ‡ National team caps and goals as of 13 April 2018

Marcela Ortiz Montalván (born 23 September 1996) is a Bolivian footballer who plays as a midfielder for the Bolivia women's national team.

== International career ==
Ortiz represented Bolivia at the 2012 South American U-17 Women's Championship and two South American U-20 Women's Championship editions (2014 and 2015). At senior level, she played the 2018 Copa América Femenina.
