= Mariela Jácome =

American–Ecuadorian footballer (born 1996)

Personal information
- Full name: Mariela Amina Jácome Riley
- Date of birth: 6 March 1996 (age 30)
- Place of birth: Long Branch, New Jersey, U.S.
- Height: 1.70 m (5 ft 7 in)
- Positions: Forward; midfielder

College career
Years	Team	Apps	(Gls)
2014–2017	St. John's Red Storm	58	(2)

Senior career*
Years	Team	Apps	(Gls)
2015	San Francisco	2	(2)

International career^{‡}
	Ecuador		(2)
- * Club domestic league appearances and goals as of 12:15, 22 June 2015 (UTC) ‡ National team caps and goals as of 17:39, 17 June 2015 (UTC)

Mariela Amina Jácome Riley (born 6 March 1996) is an American-born Ecuadorian professional footballer who plays as a forward and a midfielder. She has been a member of the Ecuador women's national team.

She was part of the Ecuadorian squad for the 2015 FIFA Women's World Cup. She also had a brief stint in the Ecuadorian league playing for San Francisco.

== Personal life ==
Jácome was born in Long Branch, New Jersey to an American mother and an Ecuadorian father originally from Guayaquil. Growing up she attended Ichabod Crane High School in Kinderhook, New York, and in 2013 she was named by Albany Times Union to the all-star senior squad after recovering from Jácome a torn ACL a year before. She later attended St. John's University, where she played 20 games her first season. While visiting family in Ecuador, her uncle recommended that she try out for the Ecuador national team which was holding camp nearby. Jácome did and soon after was named part of the 2015 FIFA Women's World Cup squad.
