= Alejandra Ramos (footballer) =

Peruvian footballer (born 1996)

Personal information
- Full name: Alejandra Frances Ramos Ruiz
- Date of birth: 1 July 1996 (age 30)
- Place of birth: Washington, D.C., United States
- Height: 1.57 m (5 ft 2 in)
- Position: Midfielder

Youth career
- Montgomery Soccer Club
- Bethesda Soccer Club 95
- Walter Johnson High School

College career
Years	Team	Apps	(Gls)
2015–2016	Montgomery Raptors	35	(21)

International career^{‡}
2012	Peru U17	1+	(1)
2014–2015	Peru U20	3+	(3)
2014	Peru	2	(0)
- ‡ National team caps and goals as of 19 September 2014

Alejandra Frances Ramos Ruiz (born 1 July 1996) is a footballer who plays as a midfielder. Born in the United States, she has been a member of the Peru women's national team.

== Early life ==
Ramos was born to Peruvian parents in Washington, D.C. and raised in Rockville, Maryland.

== College career ==
Ramos attended the Montgomery College.

== International career ==
Ramos represented Peru at the 2012 South American U-17 Women's Championship and two South American U-20 Women's Championship editions (2014 and 2015). At senior level, she played the 2014 Copa América Femenina.
