= Tahicelis Marcano =

Venezuelan footballer (born 1997)

Personal information
- Full name: Tahicelis Susana Marcano Vargas
- Date of birth: 12 April 1997 (age 29)
- Place of birth: Bergantín (Venezuela)
- Height: 1.69 m (5 ft 7 in)
- Positions: Midfielder; forward

Team information
- Current team: SUVA Sports (CR)
- Number: 6

Senior career*
Years	Team	Apps	(Gls)
2014	Mickey Sport		
2016	Deportivo Anzoátegui		
2017	Estudiantes de Guárico		
2018	Dynamo Puerto		
2019	LALA		
2021	SUVA Sports (Costa rica)		

International career^{‡}
2014	Venezuela U17	6	(1)
2016	Venezuela U20	3	(0)
2014–	Venezuela	4	(1)
- * Club domestic league appearances and goals ‡ National team caps and goals as of 25 November 2014

Tahicelis Susana Marcano Vargas (born 12 April 1997) is a Venezuelan footballer who plays as a midfielder for the Costa Rican first division club SUVA Sports and Venezuela women's national team.

== International career ==
Marcano represented Venezuela at the 2014 FIFA U-17 Women's World Cup and the 2016 FIFA U-20 Women's World Cup. At senior level, she played the 2014 Central American and Caribbean Games.

=== International goals ===
Scores and results list Venezuela's goal tally first

No.	Date	Venue	Opponent	Score	Result	Competition
1	20 November 2014	Estadio Unidad Deportiva Hugo Sánchez, Veracruz, Mexico	Dominican Republic	4–1	6–2	2014 Central American and Caribbean Games
