= María Barrantes =

Costa Rican footballer (born 1989)

María Fernanda Barrantes
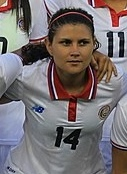
- Barrantes with Costa Rica in 2015

Personal information
- Full name: María Fernanda Barrantes Rojas
- Date of birth: 12 April 1989 (age 37)
- Place of birth: Costa Rica
- Height: 1.58 m (5 ft 2 in)
- Position: Forward

Team information
- Current team: UD Moravia

Senior career*
Years	Team	Apps	(Gls)
- UD Moravia

International career
2010–2017	Costa Rica	23	(21)
- * Club domestic league appearances and goals

María Fernanda Barrantes Rojas (born 12 April 1989) is a Costa Rican footballer who plays as a forward for UD Moravia.
