= Associação Atlética Portuguesa (Santos) =

Portuguesa Santista
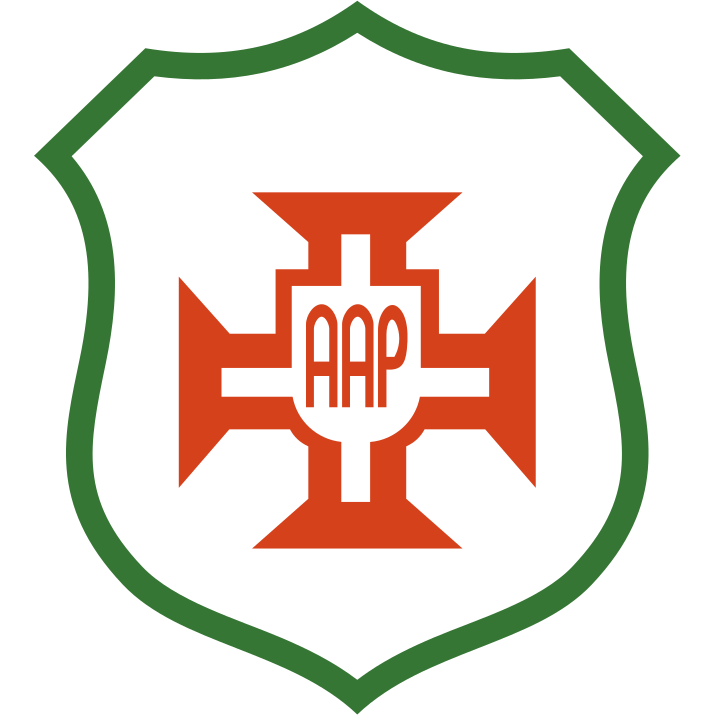
- Full name: Associação Atlética Portuguesa
- Nicknames: Briosa; Lusinha; Santista
- Founded: 20 November 1917 (108 years ago)
- Ground: Ulrico Mursa
- Capacity: 7,635
- President: Sérgio Schlicht
- Head coach: Sérgio Guedes
- League: Campeonato Paulista Série A3
- 2025: Paulista Série A2, 15th of 16 (relegated)
- Website: http://www.aaportuguesa.com
Home colors	Away colors

Associação Atlética Portuguesa, commonly referred to as Portuguesa Santista, is a professional football club based in Santos, São Paulo, Brazil. The team competes in Campeonato Paulista Série A3, the third tier of the São Paulo state football league.

Founded in 1917 by the Portuguese descendants of the city, they play in predominantly red and green colors, being the use of those colors inspired on the main colors displayed by the Portuguese flag. The club's nickname, Briosa, was given between 1918 and 1920, when the club competed in several amateur football festivals. Briosa means courageous, graceful, in Portuguese.

== History ==
In November 1914, Pedreira do Contorno workers, in Jabaquara neighborhood, Santos, were watching Espanha Futebol Clube matches and dreaming about creating a football club on their own. On 20 November 1917, Manoel Tavares had a meeting at Alexandre Coelho's barber shop, with 15 other people, who decided to found a club honoring Portugal. The name they chose was Associação Atlética Portuguesa and Lino do Carmo was elected as the club's first president.

The club's first match was played on 5 December 1920, when they beat Sírio Futebol Clube 6–0 at Estádio Ulrico Mursa.

In 1950, Portuguesa Santista had its first trip to another country. In Portugal, the club played seven matches, winning five of them and losing the other two.

In 1959, Portuguesa Santista traveled to Portuguese-ruled African territories at the time, playing against Angolan and Mozambican clubs, and won all the 15 matches they played, scoring 75 goals and conceding 10. Because of this great performance, Portuguesa Santista won Fita Azul do Futebol Brasileiro (Brazilian Football Blue Ribbon in English), given to the club which succeeds in trips to another countries. In the course of this same trip, before playing against Portuguese Africa's football clubs, Portuguesa Santista cancelled its friendly matches scheduled for taking place in apartheid South Africa because Portuguesa Santista's black players weren't allowed to play by the South African authorities ruling the country at the time.

In 1964, Portuguesa won the second division of Campeonato Paulista (currently known as Campeonato Paulista Série A2), gaining promotion to the following year's first division.

In 1997, the club competed in Brazilian Championship Third Level, but was eliminated in the first stage.

In 2004, Portuguesa Santista competed in Copa do Brasil, being eliminated in the first round by 15 de Novembro of Campo Bom, Rio Grande do Sul.

Portuguesa Santista was the first youth club of Neymar, who as of December 2025 plays for Brazilian club Santos and the Brazil national team.

== Honours ==
=== Official tournaments ===
State
Competitions	Titles	Seasons
Copa Paulista	1	2023
Campeonato Paulista Série A2	4	1932, 1933, 1934, 1964
Campeonato Paulista Série A3	1	2026
Campeonato Paulista Série A4	1	2016

=== Others tournaments ===
==== State ====
- Troféu Paulo Machado de Carvalho (1): 1971
- Torneio Início (1): 1929 (LAF)

==== City ====
- Campeonato Santista (ASEA) (8): 1923, 1924, 1926, 1927, 1931, 1932, 1933, 1934
- Torneio Eliminatório (LAF) (1): 1929

=== Runners-up ===
- Campeonato Paulista Série A2 (1): 1996
- Campeonato Paulista Série A3 (1): 2018

=== Awards ===
- Fita Azul (1): 1959

Fita Azul do Futebol Brasileiro (Brazilian Football Blue Ribbon) was an award given for the club which succeeds in an excursion out of the country.

== Stadium ==
Portuguesa Santista's stadium is Estádio Ulrico Mursa, built in 1920, with a maximum capacity of approximately 7,600 people.
