= Katerin Castro =

Colombian footballer (born 1991)

Personal information
- Full name: Katerin Fabiola Castro Muñoz
- Date of birth: 21 November 1991 (age 34)
- Height: 1.74 m (5 ft 9 in)
- Position: Forward

Senior career*
Years	Team	Apps	(Gls)
- Club Deportivo Estudiantes F.C.

International career
	Colombia	14	(5)
- * Club domestic league appearances and goals

Katerin Fabiola Castro Muñoz (born 21 November 1991) is a Colombian footballer who played as a forward for the Colombia women's national football team. She was part of the team at the 2011 FIFA Women's World Cup. At the club level, she played for Club Deportivo Estudiantes F.C. in Colombia.
