= Gabriela García =

Venezuelan footballer (born 1997)

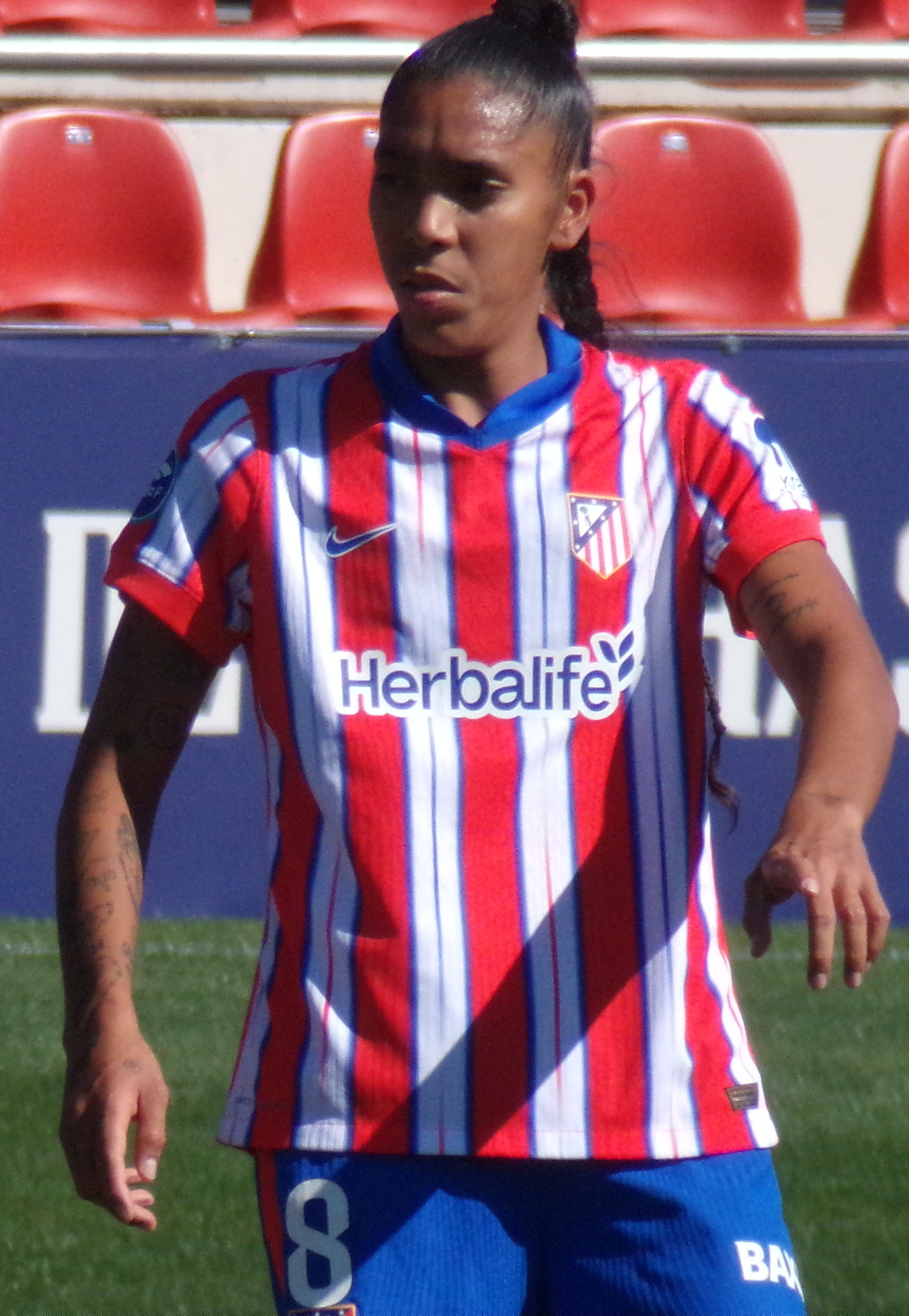

Personal information
- Full name: Gabriela Antonia García Segura
- Date of birth: 2 April 1997 (age 29)
- Place of birth: Tunapuy, Venezuela
- Height: 1.79 m (5 ft 10 in)
- Position: Midfielder

Team information
- Current team: América
- Number: 5

Senior career*
Years	Team	Apps	(Gls)
2015–2017	Estudiantes Guárico		
2017–2021	Deportivo La Coruña	54	(16)
2021–2023	Real Sociedad	42	(10)
2023–2025	Atlético Madrid	68	(10)
2026–	América	22	(4)

International career^{‡}
2013–2014	Venezuela U17	13	(14)
2015–2016	Venezuela U20	10	(4)
2014–	Venezuela	43	(15)
- * Club domestic league appearances and goals as of 24 May 2026 ‡ National team caps and goals as of 22:06, 23 March 2015 (UTC)

Gabriela Antonia García Segura (born 2 April 1997) is a Venezuelan professional footballer who plays as a Midfielder for Liga MX Femenil side Club América and the Venezuela national team. She has also played for the national U17 and U20 squads.

== Career ==
Born in Tunapuy, Gaby excelled at handball, basketball and football as a youth. After a strong showing at a Sucre Department football tournament in 2007, she joined the Venezuela youth national team setup.

Gaby joined Deportivo de La Coruña in 2017. Over four seasons she helped Deportivo gain promotion to Liga F, and became the first player to appear in 100 competitive matches for the club. Gaby scored 31 goals during the 2018–19 Segunda División season, securing promotion for Deportivo.

Gaby led Real Sociedad Femenino to the 2022–23 Supercopa de España Femenina final, where she suffered a serious leg injury.

In the 2023–24 season, Gaby scored in the 1-0 home victory against Sporting de Huelva.

== Career statistics ==
Scores and results list Venezuela's goal tally first.

No.	Date	Venue	Opponent	Score	Result	Competition
1.	19 February 2022	Goldcity Sport Complex, Alanya, Turkey	Latvia	2–0	3–0	2022 Turkish Women's Cup
2.	21 September 2023	Estadio Olímpico de la UCV, Caracas, Venezuela	Uruguay	1–0	1–0	Friendly
3.	5 April 2024	Brígido Iriarte Stadium, Caracas, Venezuela	Panama	1–0	2–0	Friendly
4.	18 April 2026	Estadio Metropolitano de Cabudare, Cabudare, Venezuela	Bolivia	2–0	8–0	2025–26 CONMEBOL Women's Nations League

== Honours ==
Club América

- Liga MX Femenil: Clausura 2026
- CONCACAF W Champions Cup: 2025–26
