= Kika Moreno =

Venezuelan footballer (born 1997)

Personal information
- Full name: Lourdes Yaurimar Moreno Beleno
- Date of birth: 25 January 1997 (age 29)
- Place of birth: Barinas, Barinas, Venezuela
- Height: 1.54 m (5 ft 1 in)
- Position: Midfielder

Team information
- Current team: Grêmio

Senior career*
Years	Team	Apps	(Gls)
2017–2021	Deportivo La Coruña	36	(5)
2021–2022	DUX Logroño	23	(1)
2023	Independiente Medellín	8	(1)
2025	3B da Amazônia	15	(3)
2025–	Grêmio	11	(1)

International career^{‡}
2012–2014	Venezuela U17	9+	(5)
2015–2016	Venezuela U20	4+	(2)
2014–	Venezuela	23	(1)
- * Club domestic league appearances and goals as of 8 May 2022 ‡ National team caps and goals as of 21 November 2016

Lourdes Yaurimar Moreno Beleno (born 25 January 1997), better known as Kika Moreno, is a Venezuelan footballer who plays as a midfielder for Grêmio and Venezuela women's national team. She has also represented her country at the U17 and U20 levels.

== International goals ==
Scores and results list Venezuela's goal tally first

No.	Date	Venue	Opponent	Score	Result	Competition
1.	18 April 2026	Estadio Metropolitano de Cabudare, Cabudare, Venezuela	Bolivia	5–0	8–0	2025–26 CONMEBOL Women's Nations League
2.	18 April 2026	Estadio Metropolitano de Cabudare, Cabudare, Venezuela	Bolivia	8–0	8–0	2025–26 CONMEBOL Women's Nations League
