= Cabudare =

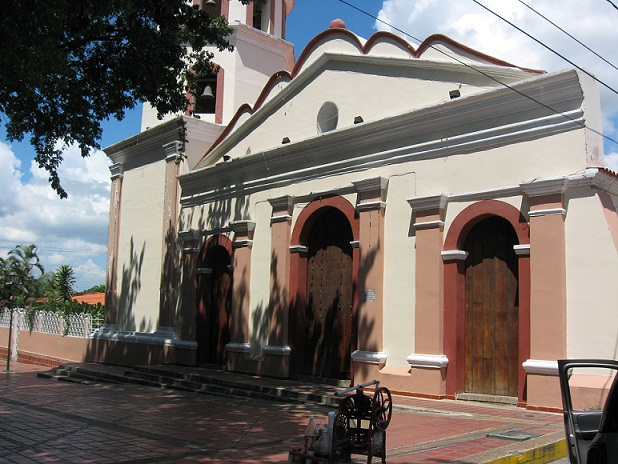
- Church of Cabudare

- Location within Venezuela
- Coordinates: 10°1′59″N 69°15′48″W
- Country: Venezuela
- State: Lara
- Municipality: Palavecino Municipality
- Elevation: 400 m (1,300 ft)

Population (2019)
  - City: 200,000
  - Estimate (2026): 226,891
  - Rank: 24th in Venezuela; 34th (Agglomeration)
  - Urban: 113,832
  - Demonym: Cabudareño/a
- Part of the (Barquisimeto Metropolitan Area)
- Time zone: VST
- Postal code: 3023
- Area code: 0251
- Climate: BSh

Cabudare (Spanish pronunciation: [kaβuˈðaɾe], original indigenous name Kabudari), is a city in Lara State, in Venezuela, and capital of the Palavecino Municipality. Located at an elevation of 400 m on the Turbio River, it is on the major west-central freeway, the Autopista Centro Occidental. Due to the growth of the economy in Barquisimeto, Cabudare has become a bedroom community, with new housing construction replacing the sugar cane fields. A minority of the population are still engaged in agriculture within the municipality.

There are important private hospitals such as Clínica IDB Cabudare and Hospital Internacional.

The city had 78,578 inhabitants (c. 2011), which represented 40.5% of the total population of the Palavecino municipality.

Cabudare currently represents one of the biggest urban growth in Venezuela, due to its commercial and housing expansion. It has several urbanisations and neighbourhoods where a large quantity of people lives. However, in terms of beauty of the municipality, there are some improvements to be made since there has not been a lot of maintenance in important areas by the previous mayors, so it is needing a push from its inhabitants to their governance in order to improve the city.

It has been considered as the dormitory city of Barquisimeto, which is the capital or the Lara State, due to its housing growth; however, it also has had commercial and industrial growth.
