= Football at the 2014 Central American and Caribbean Games =

2014 Central American and Caribbean Games football tournament
Tournament details
- Host country: Mexico
- Dates: 17 – 28 November
- Teams: 8 (men's) + 8 (women's) (from 2 confederations)
- Venues: 2 (in 1 host city)

Final positions
- Champions: Mexico (men's); Mexico (women's)
- Runners-up: Venezuela (men's); Colombia (women's)
- Third place: Cuba (men's); Costa Rica (women's)
- Fourth place: Honduras (men's); Venezuela (women's)

Tournament statistics
- Top scorer(s): (Honduras) Eddie Hernández (6 goals) (men's) (Mexico) Charlyn Corral (5 goals) (women's)

The 2014 Central American and Caribbean Games football tournament is scheduled to be the 20th edition of the competition at the 21st edition of the Central American and Caribbean Games. It will be the first CAC Games football competition to take since 2006 due to the cancellation of the 2010 edition.

Although the competition is considered to be an under-21 age group competition, up to three players born before 1 January 1993 may be named in the squad. Each participating national football association will select a final squad of 20 players.

The women's tournament was won by Mexico over Colombia.

The men's tournament was won by Mexico as well, over Venezuela. This is the 6th gold medal in this competition for the Mexican side. The last time they accomplished the gold medal was over 20 years ago.

== Venues ==
Veracruz	Boca del Río	Football at the 2014 Central American and Caribbean Games is located in Mexico
Estadio Luis "Pirata" Fuente	Estadio Unidad Deportiva Hugo Sánchez	Football at the 2014 Central American and Caribbean Games is located in Mexico
19.164222°N 96.125017°W	19.162316°N 96.114581°W	Football at the 2014 Central American and Caribbean Games is located in Mexico
Capacity: 28,703	Capacity: 1,200	Football at the 2014 Central American and Caribbean Games is located in Mexico

== Men's event ==
=== Participants ===
Team	Football Association	National Olympic Association	Qualification method
Mexico	Federación Mexicana de Fútbol	Comité Olímpico Mexicano	Competition host
Honduras	Federación Nacional Autónoma de Fútbol de Honduras	Comité Olímpico Hondureño	Winner of the 2013 Central American Games competition
Costa Rica	Federación Costarricense de Fútbol	Comité Olímpico de Costa Rica	Runner-up of the 2013 Central American Games competition
El Salvador	Federación Salvadoreña de Fútbol	Comité Olímpico de El Salvador	Third-place of the 2013 Central American Games competition
Cuba	Asociación de Fútbol de Cuba	Cuban Olympic Committee	Semi-finalist at the 2013 CONCACAF U-20 Championship
Jamaica	Jamaica Football Federation	Jamaica Olympic Association	Quarter-finalist at the 2013 CONCACAF U-20 Championship
Haiti	Fédération Haïtienne de Football	Comité Olympique Haïtien	Invited (replaced Colombia)
Venezuela	Federación Venezolana de Fútbol	Comité Olímpico Venezolano	Invited

=== Group stage ===
Each team will play one game against each of the teams in their group in a round-robin format. Teams will be awarded three points for a win, one for a tie and no points for a loss.

Teams that finish in 1st and 2nd position will advance to the semi-final round.

Tie-breaking criteria

Teams were ranked on the following criteria:

1. Greater number of points in all group matches
2. Goal difference in all group matches
3. Greater number of goals scored in all group matches

The group stage draw was conducted on 9 October 2014.

==== Group A ====
Team	Pld	W	D	L	GF	GA	GD	Pts	Qualification
Mexico	3	3	0	0	12	2	+10	9	Semi-finals
Honduras	3	2	0	1	7	7	0	6	Semi-finals
El Salvador	3	1	0	2	3	5	−2	3	Eliminated
Jamaica	3	0	0	3	3	11	−8	0	Eliminated

18 November 2014
16:00

Jamaica	1–3	El Salvador
C. Marsh 57'	Report	J. Ortiz 12', 45'; J. Peña 79'

Estadio Luis "Pirata" Fuente, Veracruz
Referee: John Pitti (Panama)

18 November 2014
21:00

Mexico	5–2	Honduras
J. Espericueta 3'; E. Torres 31', 53' (pen.); H. Marín 41'; Zaldívar 47'	Report	E. Hernández 24', 90+1' (pen.)

Estadio Luis "Pirata" Fuente, Veracruz
Referee: Yadel Martínez Pupo (Cuba)

20 November 2014
16:00

Jamaica	2–3	Honduras
Benbow 43'; W. Paul 70'	Report	Flores 25'; E. Hernández 58' (pen.), 90+2'

Estadio Luis "Pirata" Fuente, Veracruz
Referee: Malon Mejia (El Salvador)

20 November 2014
21:00

Mexico	2–0	El Salvador
R. López 50'; E. Torres 70'	Report

Estadio Luis "Pirata" Fuente, Veracruz
Referee: Henry Bejarano (Costa Rica)

22 November 2014
16:00

El Salvador	0–2	Honduras
	Report	E. Hernández 47'; K. López 79'

Estadio Luis "Pirata" Fuente, Veracruz
Referee: Cesar Ramos (Mexico)

22 November 2014
21:00

Mexico	5–0	Jamaica
M. Zúñiga 13', 21', 35'; H. Marín 37'; A. Zamorano 53'	Report

Estadio Luis "Pirata" Fuente, Veracruz
Referee: John Pitti (Panama)

==== Group B ====
Team	Pld	W	D	L	GF	GA	GD	Pts	Qualification
Venezuela	3	2	1	0	5	1	+4	7	Semi-finals
Cuba	3	2	1	0	4	1	+3	7	Semi-finals
Costa Rica	3	0	1	2	3	5	−2	1	Eliminated
Haiti	3	0	1	2	2	8	−6	1	Eliminated

19 November 2014
16:00

Costa Rica	1–2	Cuba
Cabalceta 38'	Report	Fernandez 43' (o.g.); Reyes 64'

Estadio Luis "Pirata" Fuente, Veracruz
Referee: Valdin Legister (Jamaica)

19 November 2014
21:00

Haiti	0–4	Venezuela
	Report	Ponce 7' (pen.), 68'; Murillo 41'; Peñaranda 78'

Estadio Luis "Pirata" Fuente, Veracruz
Referee: Cesar Ramos (Mexico)

21 November 2014
16:00

Haiti	0–2	Cuba
	Report	Santa Cruz 34'; Diz 66'

Estadio Luis "Pirata" Fuente, Veracruz
Referee: Oscar Moncada (Honduras)

21 November 2014
21:00

Costa Rica	0–1	Venezuela
	Report	Ponce 56' (pen.)

Estadio Luis "Pirata" Fuente, Veracruz
Referee: Javier Santos (Puerto Rico)

23 November 2014
16:00

Costa Rica	2–2	Haiti
J. Ordain 23'; F. Rodríguez 69'	Report	N. St. Vil 14', 90+1'

Estadio Luis "Pirata" Fuente, Veracruz
Referee: Oscar Moncada (Honduras)

23 November 2014
21:00

Cuba	0–0	Venezuela
	Report

Estadio Luis "Pirata" Fuente, Veracruz
Referee: Valdin Legister (Jamaica)

=== Knockout stage ===
Semi-finals
26 November – Veracruz
Mexico (pen.)	1 (7)
Cuba	1 (6)
26 November – Veracruz
Venezuela	1
Honduras	0

Gold-medal match
28 November – Veracruz
Mexico	4
Venezuela	1
Bronze-medal match
28 November – Boca del Río
Cuba	3
Honduras	1

==== Semi-finals ====
26 November 2014
21:00

Mexico	1–1 (a.e.t.)	Cuba
R. Lopez 120'	report	Y. Santa Cruz 98'
Penalties
	7–6

Estadio Luis "Pirata" Fuente, Veracruz
Referee: Henry Bejarano (Costa Rica)

26 November 2014
15:00

Venezuela	1–0	Honduras
Murillo 6'	report

Estadio Luis "Pirata" Fuente, Veracruz
Referee: Yadel Martínez Pupo (Cuba)

==== Bronze-medal match ====
28 November 2014
16:00

Cuba	3–1 (a.e.t.)	Honduras
Reyes 77'; A. Hernández 106'; Y. Santa Cruz 108'	Report	54' E. Hernández

Estadio Unidad Deportiva Hugo Sánchez, Boca del Río
Referee: César Ramos (MEX)

==== Gold-medal match ====
28 November 2014
19:00

Mexico	4–1	Venezuela
Zaldivar 10'; R. López 15'; Torres 34', 79'	report	Ponce 81'

Estadio Luis "Pirata" Fuente, Veracruz
Referee: John Pitti (Panama)

2014 Central American and Caribbean Games
Men's football tournament Winners

Mexico
6th title

== Statistics ==
=== Goalscorers ===
There were 51 goals scored in 16 matches, for an average of 3.19 goals per match.

6 goals

- (Honduras) Eddie Hernández

4 goals

- (Venezuela) Andrés Ponce

3 goals

- (Mexico) Erick Torres Padilla
- (Mexico) Martín Zúñiga
- (Mexico) Raúl López
- (Cuba) Yordan Santa Cruz

2 goals

- (Haiti) Nerin St. Vil
- (Cuba) Maikel Reyes
- (Mexico) Angel Zaldivar
- (Mexico) Erick Torres
- (Mexico) Hedgardo Marín
- (El Salvador) José Ortiz
- (Venezuela) Jhon Murillo

1 goal

- (Costa Rica) Erick Cabalceta
- (Costa Rica) Jhamir Ordain
- (Costa Rica) Francisco Rodríguez
- (Cuba) Adrián Diz
- (Cuba) Arichel Hernández
- (Honduras) Deybi Flores
- (Honduras) Kevin López
- (Jamaica) Cardel Benbow
- (Jamaica) Chevone Marsh
- (Jamaica) Wilson Paul
- (El Salvador) José Peña
- (Mexico) Jonathan Espericueta
- (Mexico) Armando Zamorano
- (Venezuela) Adalberto Peñaranda

1 own goal

- (Costa Rica) William Alban Fernandez (playing against Cuba)

== Women's event ==
=== Group stage ===
Each team will play one game against each of the teams in their group in a round-robin format. Teams will be awarded three points for a win, one for a tie and no points for a loss.

Teams that finish in 1st and 2nd position will advance to the semi-final round.

Tie-breaking criteria

Teams were ranked on the following criteria:

1. Greater number of points in all group matches
2. Goal difference in all group matches
3. Greater number of goals scored in all group matches

The group stage draw was conducted on 9 October 2014.

==== Group A ====
Team	Pld	W	D	L	GF	GA	GD	Pts	Qualification
Colombia	3	2	1	0	11	1	+10	7	Semi-finals
Mexico	3	2	1	0	8	1	+7	7	Semi-finals
Haiti	3	0	1	2	1	5	−4	1	Eliminated
Trinidad and Tobago	3	0	1	2	1	14	−13	1	Eliminated

17 November 2014
10:00

Trinidad and Tobago	1–1	Haiti
Campbell 51'	Report	Borgella 27'

Estadio Unidad Deportiva Hugo Sánchez, Boca del Río
Referee: (Honduras) Melissa Pastrana

17 November 2014
15:00

Mexico	1–1	Colombia
Corral 90+5'	Report	Velásquez 32'

Estadio Unidad Deportiva Hugo Sánchez, Boca del Río
Referee: (Costa Rica) Marianela Araya

19 November 2014
15:00

Mexico	6–0	Trinidad and Tobago
Corral 45', 55', 65' (pen.), 70'; Domínguez 46'; Jaramillo 61'	Report

Estadio Unidad Deportiva Hugo Sánchez, Boca del Río
Referee: (United States) Christina Unkel

19 November 2014
18:00

Colombia	3–0	Haiti
Pineda 30'; Castro 66', 77'	Report

Estadio Unidad Deportiva Hugo Sánchez, Boca del Río
Referee: (Canada) Michelle Pye

21 November 2014
10:00

Trinidad and Tobago	0–7	Colombia
	Report	N. Arias 6'; D. Ospina 18'; Ollivierre 32' (o.g.); I. Vidal 33'; Castro 77', 79'; Y. Rincón 90+3'

Estadio Unidad Deportiva Hugo Sánchez, Boca del Río
Referee: (Mexico) Francia González

21 November 2014
15:00

Mexico	1–0	Haiti
Mayor 87'	Report

Estadio Unidad Deportiva Hugo Sánchez, Boca del Río
Referee: (Honduras) Melissa Pastrana

==== Group B ====
Team	Pld	W	D	L	GF	GA	GD	Pts	Qualification
Costa Rica	3	3	0	0	11	2	+9	9	Semi-finals
Venezuela	3	2	0	1	10	2	+8	6	Semi-finals
Nicaragua	3	1	0	2	1	6	−5	3	Eliminated
Dominican Republic	3	0	0	3	3	13	−10	0	Eliminated

18 November 2014
10:00

Dominican Republic	0–1	Nicaragua
	Report	Solís 30'

Estadio Unidad Deportiva Hugo Sánchez, Boca del Río
Referee: Maurees Urane Skeete (Guyana)

18 November 2014
15:00

Venezuela	1–2	Costa Rica
Cañas 29'	Report	Granados 77'; K. Villalobos 89'

Estadio Unidad Deportiva Hugo Sánchez, Boca del Río
Referee: Francia González (Mexico)

20 November 2014
10:00

Venezuela	6–2	Dominican Republic
Garcia 10', 82'; Cañas 18'; Basanta 52'; Marcano 56'; Vargas 90+5' (o.g.)	Report	Y. Núñez 45+1'; Ubri 68'

Estadio Unidad Deportiva Hugo Sánchez, Boca del Río
Referee: Tatiana Guzmán (Nicaragua)

20 November 2014
15:00

Nicaragua	0–3	Costa Rica
	Report	Alvarado 10' (pen.); Venegas 44'; G. Villalobos 90+2'

Estadio Unidad Deportiva Hugo Sánchez, Boca del Río
Referee: Gillian Martindale (Barbados)

22 November 2014
10:00

Venezuela	3–0	Nicaragua
Moreno 20'; García 45+2', 59'	Report

Estadio Unidad Deportiva Hugo Sánchez, Boca del Río
Referee: Christina Unkel (United States)

22 November 2014
15:00

Dominican Republic	1–6	Costa Rica
Ubri 70'	Report	Sánchez 14' (pen.); Barrantes 33'; K. Villalobos 39', 61', 90'; Y. Rodríguez 53'

Estadio Unidad Deportiva Hugo Sánchez, Boca del Río
Referee: Maurees Urane Skeete (Guyana)

=== Knockout stage ===
Semi-finals
25 November – Boca del Río
Colombia	1
Venezuela	0
25 November – Boca del Río
Costa Rica	0
Mexico	1

Final
27 November – Veracruz
Colombia	0
Mexico	2
Third-place
27 November – Boca del Río
Venezuela	2
Costa Rica	3

==== Semi-finals ====
25 November 2014
9:00

Colombia	1–0	Venezuela
Montoya 83'	Report

Estadio Unidad Deportiva Hugo Sánchez, Boca del Río

25 November 2014
15:00

Costa Rica	0–1	Mexico
	Report	Pérez 90'

Estadio Unidad Deportiva Hugo Sánchez, Boca del Río

==== Bronze-medal match ====
27 November 2014
16:00

Venezuela	2–3	Costa Rica
	Report

Estadio Unidad Deportiva Hugo Sánchez, Boca del Río

==== Gold-medal match ====
27 November 2014
19:00

Colombia	0–2	Mexico
	Report	Corral 74'; Domínguez 84'

Estadio Luis "Pirata" Fuente, Veracruz

2014 Central American and Caribbean Games
Women's football tournament Winners

Mexico
1st title

== Statistics ==
=== Goalscorers ===
There were 55 goals scored in 16 matches, for an average of 3.44 goals per match.

6 goals

- (Mexico) Charlyn Corral

4 goals

- (Colombia) Katerin Castro
- (Costa Rica) Karla Villalobos
- (Venezuela) Gabriela Garcia

2 goals

- (Mexico) Maribel Domínguez
- (Venezuela) Alexyar Cañas
- (Dominican Republic) Betzaida Ubri

1 goal

- (Colombia) Mildrey Pineda
- (Colombia) Oriánica Velásquez
- (Colombia) Nataly Arias
- (Colombia) Daniela Montoya
- (Colombia) Diana Ospina
- (Colombia) Ingrid Vidal
- (Colombia) Yoreli Rincón
- (Costa Rica) Katherine Alvarado
- (Costa Rica) María Barrantes
- (Costa Rica) Cristín Granados
- (Costa Rica) Yesmi Rodríguez
- (Costa Rica) Carol Sánchez
- (Costa Rica) Carolina Venegas
- (Costa Rica) Gloriana Villalobos
- (Dominican Republic) Yaqueisi Núñez
- (Haiti) Roselord Borgella
- (Mexico) Carolina Jaramillo
- (Mexico) Stephany Mayor
- (Mexico) Verónica Pérez
- (Nicaragua) Ninoska Solís
- (Trinidad and Tobago) Patrice Campbell
- (Venezuela) Leury Basanta
- (Venezuela) Kika Moreno
- (Venezuela) Tahicelis Marcano

2 own goals

- (Dominican Republic) Denny Vargas (playing against Venezuela)
- (Trinidad and Tobago) Iyesha Ollivierre (playing against Colombia)
