= Venezuela women's national football team =

Women's national football team representing Venezuela

Venezuela
- Nickname: La Vinotinto (The Wine Red)
- Association: Federación Venezolana de Fútbol (FVF)
- Confederation: CONMEBOL (South America)
- Head coach: Ricardo Belli
- Home stadium: Estadio José Antonio Anzoátegui; Polideportivo Cachamay; Estadio Pueblo Nuevo
- FIFA code: VEN
First colours	Second colours

FIFA ranking
- Current: 42 (20 October 2026)
- Highest: 42 (December 2025)
- Lowest: 84 (October 2007)

First international
- Venezuela 1–2 Colombia (Caracas, Venezuela; 13 July 1966)

Biggest win
- Bolivia 0–8 Venezuela (Coquimbo, Chile; 9 April 2018); Venezuela 8–0 Bolivia (Cabudare, Venezuela; 18 April 2026)

Biggest defeat
- Brazil 14–0 Venezuela (Mar del Plata, Argentina; 6 March 1998)

Copa América
- Appearances: 9 (first in 1991)
- Best result: Third place (1991)

The Venezuela women's national football team represents Venezuela in international women's football.

== Team image ==
=== Home stadium ===
Venezuela women's national football team plays its home matches on the Estadio José Antonio Anzoátegui, Polideportivo Cachamay or Estadio Polideportivo de Pueblo Nuevo.

== Results and fixtures ==
The following is a list of match results in the last 12 months, as well as any future matches that have been scheduled.

Legend

Win Draw Lose Fixture

=== 2025 ===
28 November 2025–26 CONMEBOL Liga de Naciones Femenina	Ecuador	0-0	Venezuela	Quito, Ecuador
18:00 –5		Report (FIFA); Report (CONMEBOL)		Stadium: Estadio Olímpico Atahualpa, Quito; Referee: Adriana Farfán (Bolivia)

2 December 2025–26 CONMEBOL Liga de Naciones Femenina	Venezuela	6-0	Peru	Cabudare, Venezuela
19:00 UTC−4	Castellanos 13'; García 36'; Martínez 42'; Higuera 48', 52'; Flórez 85'	Report (FIFA); Report (CONMEBOL)		Stadium: Estadio Metropolitano de Cabudare; Referee: Zulma Quiñónez (Paraguay)

=== 2026 ===
4 March Friendly	Brazil	1–2	Venezuela	Toluca, Mexico
15:00 UTC−6				Stadium: FMF Asociación

10 April 2025–26 CONMEBOL Liga de Naciones Femenina	Colombia	2–1	Venezuela	Cali, Colombia
20:00 UTC−5	Santos 22' (pen.); Robledo 80'	Report	Herrera 10'	Stadium: Estadio Olimpico Pascual Guerrero; Referee: Edina Alves (Brazil)

14 April 2025–26 CONMEBOL Liga de Naciones Femenina	Venezuela	1–2	Argentina	Cabudare, Venezuela
19:00 UTC−4	Olivieri 86'	Report	Holzheier 7'; Bonsegundo 57'	Stadium: Estadio Metropolitano de Cabudare; Referee: Brenda Cisternas (Chile)

18 April 2025–26 CONMEBOL Liga de Naciones Femenina	Venezuela	8–0	Bolivia	Cabudare, Venezuela
19:00 UTC−4	Flórez 2'; García 45+1'; Olivieri 45+8'; Martinet 52', 75'; Moreno 68', 90+1'; Castellanos 84' (pen.)	Report		Stadium: Estadio Metropolitano de Cabudare; Referee: Nadia Fuques (Uruguay)

9 June 2025–26 CONMEBOL Liga de Naciones Femenina	Uruguay	1–1	Venezuela	Montevideo, Uruguay
20:00 UTC−3	Pa. González 52'	Report	Castellanos 58'	Stadium: Estadio Centenario; Referee: Milagros Arruela (Peru)

26 July Central American and Caribbean Games	Costa Rica	0–3	Venezuela	Moca, Dominican Republic
16:00 UTC−4		Report	Flórez 45+2'; Reyes 52'; Durán 90+2'	Stadium: Estadio Moca 85; Referee: Marjorie Ponce (Nicaragua)

31 July Central American and Caribbean Games	Venezuela	2–0	El Salvador	Santiago de los Caballeros, Dominican Republic
16:00 UTC−4	Flórez 70'; Flórez 76'	Report		Stadium: Estadio Cibao FC; Referee: Salma Flores-Desrochers (Canada)

2 August Central American and Caribbean Games	Dominican Republic	0–1	Venezuela	Moca, Dominican Republic
17:00 UTC−4		Report	Flórez 11'	Stadium: Estadio Moca 85; Referee: Maykel Ramos (Panama)

4 August Central American and Caribbean Games	Venezuela	2–2 (3–4 p)	Colombia	Moca, Dominican Republic
16:00 UTC−4	Flórez 4'; Herrera 24'	Report	Aponzá 40'; Zamorano 53'	Stadium: Estadio Moca 85; Referee: Kenisha Prescott (Guyana)
	Penalties
	Sandoval (penalty scored); Flórez (penalty scored); Muñoz (penalty missed); O. Durán (penalty scored); Chirinos (penalty missed)		(penalty scored) González; (penalty scored) Viáfara; (penalty scored) Martínez; (penalty scored) Vásquez; (penalty missed) Perlaza

6 August Central American and Caribbean Games	Venezuela	1-2	El Salvador	Santiago de los Caballeros, Dominican Republic
16:00 UTC−4	Villamizar 89'	Report	López 27'; Sánchez 61'	Stadium: Estadio Cibao FC; Referee: Salma Flores-Desrochers (Canada)

10 October Friendly	Venezuela	0–1	Colombia	Maneiro, Venezuela
16:00 UTC−4		Report		Stadium: Centro Nacional de Alto Rendimiento

13 October Friendly	Venezuela	1–2	Colombia	Maneiro, Venezuela
16:00 UTC−4		Report		Stadium: Centro Nacional de Alto Rendimiento

27 November Friendly	France	v	Venezuela	Tomblaine, France
21:00		Report		Stadium: Stade Marcel Picot

1 December Friendly	Morocco	v	Venezuela	Paris, France
				Stadium: Stade Walter-Luzi

4 December Friendly	Spain	v	Venezuela	A Coruña, Spain
21:00				Stadium: Riazor

- Venezuela Results and Fixtures – Soccerway.com

== Coaching staff ==
=== Current coaching staff ===
Position	Name
Head coach	(Brazil) Ricardo Belli
1st Assistant coach	(Ghana) Razad Flórez
Assistant coach	(Ghana) Abdoul Moreno
Assistant coach	(Ghana) Adrián Oppong
Goalkeeper coach	(Venezuela) Ibrahim Guarecuco
Fitness coach	(Venezuela) Salem Mendoza

=== Manager history ===
Only counts official FIFA matches

Name	Period	Matches	Wins	Draws	Losses	Winning %	Notes
(Venezuela) Cristóbal Hibirmas Acosta	1991	2	0	0	2	0	
(Venezuela) Lino Alonso	1998	4	0	0	4	0	
(Venezuela) Nelson Sánchez	2003	2	0	0	2	0	
	2005	4	0	1	3	8.33	
(Brazil) Ademar "Dema" Fonseca Nogueira	2006	4	1	1	2	33.33	
(Panama) Kenneth Zseremeta	2008–2017	45	18	5	22	43.7	
(Venezuela) José Catoya	2018–2019	11	5	1	5	48.48	
(Italy) Pamela Conti	2019–2024	35	16	7	12	52.38	
(Venezuela) Oswaldo Vizcarrondo	2024	2	1	0	1	50	Interim
(Brazil) Ricardo Belli	2025–	24	10	5	9	48.61	

== Players ==
=== Current squad ===
he following players were called up for the 2025–26 CONMEBOL Liga de Naciones Femenina matches against Colombia, Argentina, and Bolivia on 10, 14, and 18 April, respectively.

Information correct as of 18 April 2026.

No.	Pos.	Player	Date of birth (age)	Club
13	GK	Nayluisa Cáceres	18 November 1999 (aged 26)	(Royal Spanish Football Federation) UD Tenerife
22	GK	Valeria Rebanales	25 August 2009 (aged 16)	(Venezuelan Football Federation) Caracas
6	DF	Michelle Romero	12 June 1997 (aged 28)	(Canadian Soccer Association) Calgary Wild
2	DF	Verónica Herrera	14 January 2000 (aged 26)	(Royal Spanish Football Federation) AEM Lleida
5	DF	Yenifer Giménez	3 May 1996 (aged 29)	(Swiss Football Association) Servette
14	DF	Raiderlin Carrasco	11 June 2002 (aged 23)	(Royal Spanish Football Federation) Levante
23	MF	Melanie Chirinos	20 March 2008 (aged 18)	(Brazilian Football Confederation) Palmeiras
20	MF	Dayana Rodríguez	20 October 2001 (aged 24)	(Brazilian Football Confederation) Corinthians
16	MF	Ailing Herrera	15 July 2008 (aged 17)	(Venezuelan Football Federation) Caracas
7	MF	Daniuska Rodríguez	4 January 1999 (aged 27)	(Portuguese Football Federation) Torreense
10	MF	Bárbara Olivieri	24 February 2002 (aged 24)	(United States Soccer Federation) Boston Legacy
8	MF	Gabriela García	2 April 1997 (aged 29)	(Mexican Football Federation) América
9	FW	Deyna Castellanos (captain)	18 April 1999 (aged 27)	(United States Soccer Federation) Portland Thorns FC
19	FW	Mariana Speckmaier	26 December 1997 (aged 28)	(The Football Association) Durham

=== Recent call-ups ===
The following players have been called up in the last 12 months.

Pos.	Player	Date of birth (age)	Caps	Goals	Club	Latest call-up

== Competitive record ==
=== FIFA Women's World Cup ===
FIFA Women's World Cup record
Year	Result	Pld	W	D*	L	GF	GA
(China) 1991	Did not qualify						
(Sweden) 1995	Did not enter						
(United States) 1999	Did not qualify						
(United States) 2003	Did not qualify						
(China) 2007	Did not qualify						
(Germany) 2011	Did not qualify						
(Canada) 2015	Did not qualify						
(France) 2019	Did not qualify						
(Australia) (New Zealand) 2023	Did not qualify						
(Brazil) 2027	To be determined						
(Costa Rica) (Jamaica) (Mexico) (United States) 2031	To be determined						
(United Kingdom) 2035	To be determined						
Total	–	–	–	–	–	–	–

*Draws include knockout matches decided on penalty kicks.

=== Olympic Games ===
Summer Olympics record
Year	Result	Pld	W	D*	L	GF	GA
(United States) 1996	Did not enter						
(Australia) 2000	Did not qualify						
(Greece) 2004	Did not qualify						
(China) 2008	Did not qualify						
(United Kingdom) 2012	Did not qualify						
(Brazil) 2016	Did not qualify						
(Japan) 2020	Did not qualify						
(France) 2024	Did not qualify						
Total	–	–	–	–	–	–	–

*Draws include knockout matches decided on penalty kicks.

=== CONMEBOL Copa América Femenina ===
CONMEBOL Copa América Femenina record
Year	Result	Pld	W	D*	L	GF	GA
(Brazil) 1991	Third place	2	0	0	2	0	7
(Brazil) 1995	Did not enter						
(Argentina) 1998	Group stage	4	0	0	4	2	25
(Peru) 2003	Group stage	2	0	0	2	0	10
(Argentina) 2006	Group stage	4	1	1	2	4	10
(Ecuador) 2010	Group stage	4	1	0	3	5	15
(Ecuador) 2014	Group stage	4	1	1	2	4	6
(Chile) 2018	Group stage	4	2	0	2	9	6
(Colombia) 2022	Sixth place	5	2	1	2	4	6
(Ecuador) 2025	Group stage	4	1	1	2	8	5
Total	Third place	33	8	4	21	36	90

*Draws include knockout matches decided on penalty kicks.

=== Pan American Games ===
Pan American Games record
Year	Result	Pld	W	D*	L	GF	GA
(Canada) 1999	Did not enter						
(Dominican Republic) 2003	Did not enter						
(Brazil) 2007	Did not enter						
(Mexico) 2011	Did not qualify						
(Canada) 2015	Did not qualify						
(Peru) 2019	Did not qualify						
(Chile) 2023	Did not qualify						
(Peru) 2027	To be determined						
Total	–	–	–	–	–	–	–

*Draws include knockout matches decided on penalty kicks.

=== Central American and Caribbean Games ===
Central American and Caribbean Games record
Year	Result	Pld	W	D*	L	GF	GA
(Venezuela) 2010	Gold medal	5	4	1	0	8	3
(Mexico) 2014	Fourth place	5	2	0	3	12	6
(Colombia) 2018	Bronze medal	5	2	0	3	7	9
(El Salvador) 2023	Retired						
Total	1 Gold medal	15	8	1	6	27	18

*Draws include knockout matches decided on penalty kicks.

=== South American Games ===
South American Games record
Year	Result	Pld	W	D*	L	GF	GA
(Chile) 2014	Fourth place	5	2	1	2	5	7
(Bolivia) 2018 to present	U-20 tournament						
Total	Fourth place	5	2	1	2	5	7

*Draws include knockout matches decided on penalty kicks.

=== Bolivarian Games ===
Bolivarian Games record
Year	Result	Pld	W	D*	L	GF	GA
(Colombia) 2005	Fifth place	4	0	1	3	3	10
(Bolivia) 2009	Bronze medal	4	2	0	2	6	6
(Peru) 2013 to present	U-20 tournament						
Total	Bronze medal	8	2	1	5	9	16

*Draws include knockout matches decided on penalty kicks.

=== Other tournaments ===
==== Torneio Internacional de Futebol Feminino ====
(Brazil) Torneio Internacional de Futebol Feminino record
Year	Result	Position	Matches	Wins	Draws	Losses	GF	GA
(Brazil) 2021	Third place	3rd	3	1	0	2	3	6
Total	1/1	0 titles	3	1	0	2	3	6

== Honours ==
=== Major competitions ===
- Copa América Femenina
  - (bronze) Third place (1): 1991

=== Regional ===
- Bolivarian Games
  - (bronze) Bronze Medalists (1): 2009
- Central American and Caribbean Games
  - (gold) Gold Medalists (1): 2010
  - (silver) Silver Medalists (1): 2023
  - (bronze) Bronze Medalists (1): 2018

== See also ==
- Sport in Venezuela
  - Football in Venezuela
    - Women's football in Venezuela
- Venezuela women's national under-20 football team
- Venezuela women's national under-17 football team
- Venezuela men's national football team
