= 2014 FIFA U-17 Women's World Cup squads =

This article lists the squads for the 2014 FIFA U-17 Women's World Cup, to be held in Costa Rica. Each competing federation is allowed a 21-player squad, which had to be submitted to FIFA.

== Group A ==
=== Costa Rica ===
Coach: (Costa Rica) Juan Diego Quesada

| No. | Pos. | Player | Date of birth (age) | Caps | Goals | Club |
|---|---|---|---|---|---|---|
| 1 | GK | María Pardo | 7 November 1997 (aged 16) | | | (Costa Rican Football Federation) Deportivo Saprissa |
| 2 | DF | Ana Chaves | 30 January 1997 (aged 17) | | | (Costa Rican Football Federation) UD Moravia |
| 3 | FW | Ariel Barquero | 9 June 1998 (aged 15) | | | (Costa Rican Football Federation) UCEM Alajuela |
| 4 | DF | María Coto | 2 March 1998 (aged 16) | | | (Costa Rican Football Federation) UCEM Alajuela |
| 5 | MF | Mariela Campos | 7 October 1998 (aged 15) | | | (Costa Rican Football Federation) Municipal Liberia |
| 6 | DF | María Elizondo | 30 November 1998 (aged 15) | | | (Costa Rican Football Federation) Municipal Turrialba |
| 7 | FW | Naomi Molina | 23 November 1997 (aged 16) | | | (Costa Rican Football Federation) AD Corredores |
| 8 | MF | Priscila Bermúdez | 16 March 1997 (aged 16) | | | (Costa Rican Football Federation) UCEM Alajuela |
| 9 | FW | Sofía Varela | 28 March 1998 (aged 15) | | | (Costa Rican Football Federation) Fortuna de Desamparados |
| 10 | MF | Gloriana Villalobos | 20 August 1999 (aged 14) | | | (Costa Rican Football Federation) Deportivo Saprissa |
| 11 | FW | Kenlly Villalobos | 22 February 1998 (aged 16) | | | (Costa Rican Football Federation) AD San Carlos |
| 12 | MF | Indira González | 9 January 1998 (aged 16) | | | (Costa Rican Football Federation) UCEM Alajuela |
| 13 | GK | Yuliana Salas | 7 April 1997 (aged 16) | | | (Costa Rican Football Federation) UD Moravia |
| 14 | DF | Fabiola Villalobos | 13 March 1998 (aged 16) | | | (Costa Rican Football Federation) Arenal Coronado |
| 15 | MF | Yaniela Arias | 25 April 1998 (aged 15) | | | (Costa Rican Football Federation) AD San Carlos |
| 16 | DF | María Araya | 8 April 1998 (aged 15) | | | (Costa Rican Football Federation) AD San Carlos |
| 17 | DF | Natalia Harley | 13 July 1997 (aged 16) | | | (Costa Rican Football Federation) AD Dimas Escazú |
| 18 | GK | Abigail Vega | 8 July 1997 (aged 16) | | | (Costa Rican Football Federation) Regional de Sarapiquí |
| 19 | DF | Mariana Mora | 6 November 1997 (aged 16) | | | (Costa Rican Football Federation) Jaco Rays FC |
| 20 | MF | Deily Wilson | 25 April 1998 (aged 15) | | | (Costa Rican Football Federation) Regional de Sarapiquí |
| 21 | MF | Emilie Valenciano | 15 February 1997 (aged 17) | | | (Costa Rican Football Federation) AD San Ramon |

=== Venezuela ===
Coach: (Panama) Kenneth Zseremeta

| No. | Pos. | Player | Date of birth (age) | Caps | Goals | Club |
|---|---|---|---|---|---|---|
| 1 | GK | Alexa Castro | 20 May 2000 (aged 13) | | | (Venezuelan Football Federation) Escuela de Futbol Jose Antonio Paez |
| 2 | DF | Verónica Herrera | 14 January 2000 (aged 14) | | | (Venezuelan Football Federation) Hermandad Gallega Caracas |
| 3 | DF | Sandra Luzardo | 18 July 1999 (aged 14) | | | (Venezuelan Football Federation) Merida Country Club |
| 4 | DF | Bárbara Serrano | 6 January 1997 (aged 17) | | | (Venezuelan Football Federation) Universidad Central de Venezuela FC |
| 5 | MF | Daniuska Rodríguez | 4 January 1999 (aged 15) | | | (Venezuelan Football Federation) Seca Sport Valencia |
| 6 | DF | Michelle Romero | 12 June 1997 (aged 16) | | | (Venezuelan Football Federation) Asozulia FC |
| 7 | MF | Yosneidy Zambrano | 16 May 1997 (aged 16) | | | (Venezuelan Football Federation) Fufem Aragua |
| 8 | MF | Yorgelis Pineda | 30 January 1997 (aged 17) | | | (Venezuelan Football Federation) FC Independente La Fria |
| 9 | FW | Deyna Castellanos | 18 April 1999 (aged 14) | | | (Venezuelan Football Federation) Escuela Juan Arango |
| 10 | MF | Lourdes Moreno | 25 January 1997 (aged 17) | | | (Venezuelan Football Federation) Portuguesa FC |
| 11 | FW | Gabriela García | 2 April 1997 (aged 16) | | | (Venezuelan Football Federation) Caracas FC |
| 12 | GK | Franyely Rodríguez | 21 September 1997 (aged 16) | | | (Venezuelan Football Federation) Valencia FC |
| 13 | GK | Nayluisa Cáceres | 18 November 1999 (aged 14) | | | (Venezuelan Football Federation) Atletico Socopo |
| 14 | FW | Tahicelis Marcano | 12 April 1997 (aged 16) | | | (Venezuelan Football Federation) Mickey Sport |
| 15 | MF | Yulianny Goyo | 20 April 1997 (aged 16) | | | (Venezuelan Football Federation) Polideportivo Maximo Viloria |
| 16 | DF | Fátima Lobo | 22 November 1999 (aged 14) | | | (Venezuelan Football Federation) Atletico Los Andes |
| 17 | DF | María García | 14 October 1999 (aged 14) | | | (Venezuelan Football Federation) Caracas FC |
| 18 | MF | Hilaris Villasana | 9 July 1998 (aged 15) | | | (Venezuelan Football Federation) Mickey Sport |
| 19 | FW | Yuleisi Rivero | 15 January 1999 (aged 15) | | | (Venezuelan Football Federation) Los Cachimbos FC |
| 20 | DF | Nikol González | 29 March 1999 (aged 14) | | | (Venezuelan Football Federation) AFF San Diego |
| 21 | MF | Tonny Pereira | 21 July 1997 (aged 16) | | | (Venezuelan Football Federation) Universidad Central de Venezuela FC |

=== Italy ===
Coach: (Italy) Enrico Sbardella

| No. | Pos. | Player | Date of birth (age) | Caps | Goals | Club |
|---|---|---|---|---|---|---|
| 1 | GK | Francesca Durante | 2 December 1997 (aged 16) | | | (Italian Football Federation) CF Scalese |
| 2 | DF | Marta Vergani | 20 May 1997 (aged 16) | | | (Italian Football Federation) Real Meda CF |
| 3 | DF | Lisa Boattin | 3 May 1997 (aged 16) | | | (Italian Football Federation) ACFD Pordenone |
| 4 | MF | Federica Cavicchia | 8 November 1998 (aged 15) | | | (Swiss Football Association) SC Kriens |
| 5 | DF | Alice Tortelli | 22 January 1998 (aged 16) | | | (Italian Football Federation) ACF Firenze |
| 6 | DF | Sara Mella | 14 April 1998 (aged 15) | | | (Italian Football Federation) ACFD Pordenone |
| 7 | MF | Valentina Bergamaschi | 22 January 1997 (aged 17) | | | (Italian Football Federation) CF Alto Verbano |
| 8 | MF | Flaminia Simonetti | 17 February 1997 (aged 17) | | | (Italian Football Federation) ASD Res Roma |
| 9 | FW | Nicole Garavelli | 20 May 1997 (aged 16) | | | (Italian Football Federation) ASD Mozzanica |
| 10 | MF | Manuela Giugliano | 18 August 1997 (aged 16) | | | (Italian Football Federation) ACFD Pordenone |
| 11 | FW | Gloria Marinelli | 12 March 1998 (aged 16) | | | (Italian Football Federation) AFD Grifo Perugia |
| 12 | GK | Ilaria Toniolo | 9 May 1997 (aged 16) | | | (Italian Football Federation) ASD Valpolicella |
| 13 | DF | Nicole Peressotti | 7 April 1998 (aged 15) | | | (Italian Football Federation) UPC Tavagnacco |
| 14 | MF | Beatrice Abati | 6 February 1997 (aged 17) | | | (Italian Football Federation) Femminile Inter Milano |
| 15 | FW | Annamaria Serturini | 13 May 1998 (aged 15) | | | (Italian Football Federation) ACF Brescia |
| 16 | DF | Federica Rizza | 13 December 1997 (aged 16) | | | (Italian Football Federation) Femminile Inter Milano |
| 17 | MF | Marta Mascarello | 15 October 1998 (aged 15) | | | (Italian Football Federation) ASD Femminile Alba |
| 18 | FW | Martina Piemonte | 7 November 1997 (aged 16) | | | (Italian Football Federation) ASD Riviera di Romagna |
| 19 | MF | Martina Ceccarelli | 6 February 1997 (aged 17) | | | (Italian Football Federation) AFD Grifo Perugia |
| 20 | DF | Beatrice Merlo | 23 February 1999 (aged 15) | | | (Italian Football Federation) Femminile Inter Milano |
| 21 | GK | Carlotta Cartelli | 18 September 1997 (aged 16) | | | (Italian Football Federation) Femminile Inter Milano |

=== Zambia ===
Coach: (Zambia) Albert Kachinga

| No. | Pos. | Player | Date of birth (age) | Caps | Goals | Club |
|---|---|---|---|---|---|---|
| 1 | GK | Edina Phiri | 23 July 1998 (aged 15) | | | (Football Association of Zambia) St. Catherine University |
| 2 | FW | Osala Kaleo | 8 July 1997 (aged 16) | | | (Football Association of Zambia) Lusaka Foundation |
| 3 | DF | Chimwemwe Mwale | 18 May 1997 (aged 16) | | | (Football Association of Zambia) National Assembly F.C. |
| 4 | DF | Given Mukanda | 6 June 1998 (aged 15) | | | (Football Association of Zambia) Chiparamba Breakthrough |
| 5 | FW | Barbra Banda | 20 March 2000 (aged 13) | | | (Football Association of Zambia) Bauleni United |
| 6 | FW | Mary Mulenga | 11 April 1998 (aged 15) | | | (Football Association of Zambia) Bauleni United |
| 7 | DF | Bridget Lungu | 7 January 1999 (aged 15) | | | (Football Association of Zambia) Chibolya Girls FC |
| 8 | DF | Judith Zulu | 11 September 1997 (aged 16) | | | (Football Association of Zambia) Bauleni United |
| 9 | FW | Memory Phiri | 12 May 1998 (aged 15) | | | (Football Association of Zambia) Green Buffaloes F.C. |
| 10 | FW | Jenny Mubanga | 23 October 1998 (aged 15) | | | (Football Association of Zambia) Bauleni United |
| 11 | MF | Grace Mulaisho | 4 November 1998 (aged 15) | | | (Football Association of Zambia) Chilenje Girls FC |
| 12 | FW | Hellen Chanda | 19 June 1998 (aged 15) | | | (Football Association of Zambia) OYDC Lusaka |
| 13 | DF | Martha Tembo | 8 March 1998 (aged 16) | | | (Football Association of Zambia) Chibolya Girls FC |
| 14 | MF | Ireen Lungu | 6 October 1997 (aged 16) | | | (Football Association of Zambia) Green Buffaloes F.C. |
| 15 | MF | Grace Chanda | 11 June 1997 (aged 16) | | | (Football Association of Zambia) Ndola United FC |
| 16 | GK | Hazel Nali | 4 April 1998 (aged 15) | | | (Football Association of Zambia) Nchanga Queens FC |
| 17 | DF | Mary Wilombe | 22 September 1997 (aged 16) | | | (Football Association of Zambia) Lusaka Foundation |
| 18 | DF | Margaret Belemu | 24 February 1997 (aged 17) | | | (Football Association of Zambia) Red Arrows F.C. |
| 19 | DF | Natasha Witika | 6 June 1997 (aged 16) | | | (Football Association of Zambia) Chiparamba Breakthrough |
| 20 | FW | Penelope Mulubwa | 24 March 1998 (aged 15) | | | (Football Association of Zambia) Luanshya United FC |
| 21 | GK | Ngambo Musole | 23 June 1998 (aged 15) | | | (Football Association of Zambia) Chiparamba Breakthrough |

== Group B ==
=== Ghana ===
Coach: (Ghana) Evans Adotey

| No. | Pos. | Player | Date of birth (age) | Caps | Goals | Club |
|---|---|---|---|---|---|---|
| 1 | GK | Azume Adams | 28 December 1997 (aged 16) | | | (Ghana Football Association) Hasaacas Ladies FC |
| 2 | DF | Naomi Anima | 18 May 1998 (aged 15) | | | (Ghana Football Association) Ash Town Ladies |
| 3 | FW | Jane Ayiyem | 19 October 1997 (aged 16) | | | (Ghana Football Association) Ash Town Ladies |
| 4 | MF | Samira Abdul Rahman | 28 November 1997 (aged 16) | | | (Ghana Football Association) Lepo Stars Ladies FC |
| 5 | DF | Florence Annor | 2 December 2000 (aged 13) | | | (Ghana Football Association) Fabulous Ladies FC |
| 6 | DF | Amina Fuseini | 12 December 1997 (aged 16) | | | (Ghana Football Association) Lepo Stars Ladies FC |
| 7 | MF | Ernestina Abambila | 30 December 1998 (aged 15) | | | (Ghana Football Association) Hasaacas Ladies FC |
| 8 | MF | Kubrah Abubakari | 17 July 1998 (aged 15) | | | (Ghana Football Association) Hasaacas Ladies FC |
| 9 | FW | Sandra Owusu-Ansah | 29 January 2000 (aged 14) | | | (Ghana Football Association) Fabulous Ladies FC |
| 10 | FW | Princella Adubea | 27 December 1998 (aged 15) | | | (Ghana Football Association) Ampem Darkoa Ladies |
| 11 | DF | Vida Opoku | 15 December 1997 (aged 16) | | | (Ghana Football Association) Olympique Marseille Ladies |
| 12 | DF | Gladys Amfobea | 1 July 1998 (aged 15) | | | (Ghana Football Association) Liver Rose Ladies |
| 13 | MF | Stephany Adomako | 28 November 1998 (aged 15) | | | (Ghana Football Association) Ash Town Ladies |
| 14 | DF | Lily Niber-Lawrence | 23 June 1997 (aged 16) | | | (Ghana Football Association) Hasaacas Ladies FC |
| 15 | DF | Belinda Anane | 14 June 1998 (aged 15) | | | (Ghana Football Association) Fabulous Ladies FC |
| 16 | GK | Rita Gyasi | 10 August 1998 (aged 15) | | | (Ghana Football Association) Madonna Ladies FC |
| 17 | FW | Fuseina Mumuni | 2 April 2001 (aged 12) | | | (Ghana Football Association) Right to Dream SA |
| 18 | MF | Vinoria Kuzagbe | 29 April 1997 (aged 16) | | | (Ghana Football Association) Ideal Ladies |
| 19 | FW | Laadi Issaka | 11 July 1997 (aged 16) | | | (Ghana Football Association) Sharp Arrows Ladies |
| 20 | DF | Adu Agyemang | 10 January 1998 (aged 16) | | | (Ghana Football Association) Ash Town Ladies |
| 21 | GK | Martha Annan | 2 November 1999 (aged 14) | | | (Ghana Football Association) Bafana Ladies |

=== Germany ===
Coach: (Germany) Anouschka Bernhard

| No. | Pos. | Player | Date of birth (age) | Caps | Goals | Club |
|---|---|---|---|---|---|---|
| 1 | GK | Vivien Brandt | 25 September 1997 (aged 16) | | | (German Football Association) FSV Gütersloh 2009 |
| 2 | DF | Michaela Brandenburg | 17 December 1997 (aged 16) | | | (German Football Association) VfL Wolfsburg |
| 3 | DF | Lisa Karl | 15 January 1997 (aged 17) | | | (German Football Association) SC Freiburg |
| 4 | DF | Melissa Friedrich | 6 May 1997 (aged 16) | | | (German Football Association) 1. FFC Frankfurt |
| 5 | MF | Kim Fellhauer | 21 January 1998 (aged 16) | | | (German Football Association) 1. FC Saarbrücken |
| 6 | MF | Saskia Matheis | 6 June 1997 (aged 16) | | | (German Football Association) 1. FFC Frankfurt |
| 7 | MF | Nina Ehegötz | 22 February 1997 (aged 17) | | | (German Football Association) FSV Gütersloh 2009 |
| 8 | MF | Saskia Meier | 19 March 1997 (aged 16) | | | (German Football Association) SC Freiburg |
| 9 | FW | Laura Widak | 5 January 1997 (aged 17) | | | (German Football Association) Bayer 04 Leverkusen |
| 10 | FW | Jasmin Sehan | 16 June 1997 (aged 16) | | | (German Football Association) VfL Wolfsburg |
| 11 | MF | Ricarda Walkling | 19 March 1997 (aged 16) | | | (German Football Association) FC Bayern Munich |
| 12 | GK | Miriam Hanemann | 24 March 1997 (aged 16) | | | (German Football Association) 1. FFC Frankfurt |
| 13 | DF | Isabella Hartig | 12 August 1997 (aged 16) | | | (German Football Association) FC Bayern Munich |
| 14 | DF | Leonie Stenzel | 23 July 1997 (aged 16) | | | (German Football Association) VfL Wolfsburg |
| 15 | MF | Franziska Harsch | 6 July 1997 (aged 16) | | | (German Football Association) TSG 1899 Hoffenheim |
| 16 | DF | Michaela Specht | 15 February 1997 (aged 17) | | | (German Football Association) FC Bayern Munich |
| 17 | DF | Andrea Viehl | 12 February 1998 (aged 16) | | | (German Football Association) FC Bayern Munich |
| 18 | MF | Laura Freigang | 1 February 1998 (aged 16) | | | (German Football Association) Holstein Kiel |
| 19 | MF | Lea Schüller | 12 November 1997 (aged 16) | | | (German Football Association) SGS Essen |
| 20 | FW | Stefanie Sanders | 12 June 1998 (aged 15) | | | (German Football Association) SV Werder Bremen |
| 21 | GK | Lena Pauels | 2 February 1998 (aged 16) | | | (German Football Association) SGS Essen |

=== North Korea ===
Coach: (North Korea) Sin Ui-Gun

| No. | Pos. | Player | Date of birth (age) | Caps | Goals | Club |
|---|---|---|---|---|---|---|
| 1 | GK | Kim Myong-Sun | 6 March 1997 (aged 17) | | | (DPR Korea Football Association) Sobaeksu SC |
| 2 | MF | Choe Un-Hwa | 9 April 1997 (aged 16) | | | (DPR Korea Football Association) Ponghwasan SC |
| 3 | DF | Ri Hui-Jong | 20 February 1998 (aged 16) | | | (DPR Korea Football Association) Sobaeksu SC |
| 4 | FW | Ha Kyong | 21 May 1998 (aged 15) | | | (DPR Korea Football Association) Wolmido SC |
| 5 | DF | Ri Chun-Gum | 18 February 1997 (aged 17) | | | (DPR Korea Football Association) Mangyongbong SC |
| 6 | MF | Ri Kum-Hyang | 25 October 1997 (aged 16) | | | (DPR Korea Football Association) Amrokgang SC |
| 7 | MF | An Song-Ok | 16 March 1998 (aged 15) | | | (DPR Korea Football Association) April 25 SC |
| 8 | MF | Ri Ji-Hyang | 17 March 1998 (aged 15) | | | (DPR Korea Football Association) Sobaeksu SC |
| 9 | MF | Ju Hyo-sim | 21 June 1998 (aged 15) | | | (DPR Korea Football Association) Chobyong FC |
| 10 | FW | Ri Hae-Yon | 10 January 1999 (aged 15) | | | (DPR Korea Football Association) Chobyong FC |
| 11 | FW | Sung Hyang-sim | 2 December 1999 (aged 14) | | | (DPR Korea Football Association) Pyongyang City SC |
| 12 | DF | Kim Jong-Sim | 6 September 1997 (aged 16) | | | (DPR Korea Football Association) Sobaeksu SC |
| 13 | FW | O Kuk-Ryon | 15 July 1997 (aged 16) | | | (DPR Korea Football Association) Amrokgang SC |
| 14 | MF | Yu Jin-A | 2 March 1997 (aged 17) | | | (DPR Korea Football Association) Myohyangsan |
| 15 | DF | Pak Sin-Jong | 27 July 1997 (aged 16) | | | (DPR Korea Football Association) Amrokgang SC |
| 16 | FW | Kim Un-Ha | 8 August 1998 (aged 15) | | | (DPR Korea Football Association) Myohyangsan |
| 17 | MF | Ri Pom-Hyang | 15 March 1998 (aged 16) | | | (DPR Korea Football Association) Chobyong FC |
| 18 | GK | Kim Yong-Sun | 2 March 1998 (aged 16) | | | (DPR Korea Football Association) April 25 SC |
| 19 | FW | Wi Jong-Sim | 13 October 1997 (aged 16) | | | (DPR Korea Football Association) Kalmaegi SC |
| 20 | FW | Kim Pom-Ui | 2 February 1999 (aged 15) | | | (DPR Korea Football Association) Sobaeksu SC |
| 21 | GK | Ri Un-Jong | 6 November 1999 (aged 14) | | | (DPR Korea Football Association) Chobyong FC |

=== Canada ===
Coach: Beverly Priestman

| No. | Pos. | Player | Date of birth (age) | Caps | Goals | Club |
|---|---|---|---|---|---|---|
| 1 | GK | Rylee Foster | 13 August 1998 (aged 15) | 7 | 0 | (Canadian Soccer Association) Woodbridge SC |
| 2 | DF | Sura Yekka | 4 January 1997 (aged 17) | 4 | 0 | (Canadian Soccer Association) Brams United |
| 3 | DF | Rachel Jones | 18 February 1997 (aged 17) | 9 | 0 | (Canadian Soccer Association) Vancouver Whitecaps Girls Elite |
| 4 | MF | Kamira Lemire | 19 October 1998 (aged 15) | 5 | 0 | (Canadian Soccer Association) AS Varennes |
| 5 | DF | Easther Mayi Kith | 28 March 1997 (aged 16) | 6 | 0 | (Canadian Soccer Association) AS Laser de Joliette |
| 6 | DF | Bianca St-Georges | 28 July 1997 (aged 16) | 8 | 0 | (Canadian Soccer Association) AS Laser de Joliette |
| 7 | FW | Marie Levasseur | 18 May 1997 (aged 16) | 8 | 9 | (Canadian Soccer Association) CS Haute-Saint-Charles |
| 8 | MF | Jessie Fleming (c) | 11 March 1998 (aged 16) | 9 | 4 | (Canadian Soccer Association) London NorWest SC |
| 9 | FW | Nadya Gill | 26 September 1998 (aged 15) | 5 | 4 | (Canadian Soccer Association) Vaughan SC |
| 10 | MF | Sarah Kinzner | 28 August 1997 (aged 16) | 9 | 2 | (Canadian Soccer Association) Calgary Foothills WFC |
| 11 | FW | Marie-Mychèle Métivier | 1 August 1997 (aged 16) | 9 | 6 | (Canadian Soccer Association) Armada Chaudière-Est |
| 12 | DF | Simmrin Dhaliwal | 10 February 1997 (aged 17) | 9 | 0 | (Canadian Soccer Association) Vancouver Whitecaps Girls Elite |
| 13 | MF | Avery Lakeman | 16 March 1998 (aged 15) | 2 | 0 | (Canadian Soccer Association) Edmonton Drillers |
| 14 | MF | Sarah Stratigakis | 7 March 1999 (aged 15) | 8 | 0 | (Canadian Soccer Association) Woodbridge SC |
| 15 | FW | Emily Borgmann | 30 December 1997 (aged 16) | 9 | 5 | (Canadian Soccer Association) Burlington SC |
| 16 | FW | Anyssa Ibrahim | 8 February 1999 (aged 15) | 2 | 0 | (Canadian Soccer Association) Soccer Terrebonne |
| 17 | FW | Gabrielle Carle | 10 December 1998 (aged 15) | 4 | 0 | (Canadian Soccer Association) Chaudière-Est |
| 18 | GK | Devon Kerr | 3 July 1997 (aged 16) | 2 | 0 | (Canadian Soccer Association) Glen Shields SC |
| 19 | MF | Nahida Baalbaki | 15 August 1999 (aged 14) | 0 | 0 | (Canadian Soccer Association) Lakeshore SC |
| 20 | DF | Mika Richards | 4 April 1997 (aged 16) | 3 | 0 | (Canadian Soccer Association) Brams United |
| 21 | GK | Lysianne Proulx | 17 April 1999 (aged 14) | 0 | 0 | (Canadian Soccer Association) CS Roussillon |

== Group C ==
=== Spain ===
Coach: (Spain) Jorge Vilda

| No. | Pos. | Player | Date of birth (age) | Caps | Goals | Club |
|---|---|---|---|---|---|---|
| 1 | GK | Elena de Toro | 31 January 1997 (aged 17) | | | (Royal Spanish Football Federation) FF La Solana |
| 2 | DF | Nuria Garrote | 10 June 1997 (aged 16) | | | (Royal Spanish Football Federation) FC Barcelona |
| 3 | DF | Beatriz Beltrán | 10 December 1997 (aged 16) | | | (Royal Spanish Football Federation) Atlético Madrid |
| 4 | DF | Silvia Mérida | 14 January 1998 (aged 16) | | | (Royal Spanish Football Federation) Atletico Benamiel CF |
| 5 | DF | Rocío Gálvez | 15 April 1997 (aged 16) | | | (Royal Spanish Football Federation) Real Betis |
| 6 | MF | Pilar Garrote | 10 June 1997 (aged 16) | | | (Royal Spanish Football Federation) FC Barcelona |
| 7 | FW | Nahikari García | 10 March 1997 (aged 17) | | | (Royal Spanish Football Federation) Real Sociedad |
| 8 | FW | Mireya García | 13 August 1997 (aged 16) | | | (Royal Spanish Football Federation) Sevilla FC |
| 9 | MF | Patricia Guijarro | 17 May 1998 (aged 15) | | | (Royal Spanish Football Federation) UD Collerense |
| 10 | FW | Andrea Falcón | 28 February 1997 (aged 17) | | | (Royal Spanish Football Federation) FC Barcelona |
| 11 | FW | Carmen Menayo | 14 April 1998 (aged 15) | | | (Royal Spanish Football Federation) Puebla de la Calzada FF |
| 12 | FW | Laura Ortega | 10 November 1997 (aged 16) | | | (Royal Spanish Football Federation) Atlético Madrid |
| 13 | GK | Marta Alemany | 30 March 1998 (aged 15) | | | (Royal Spanish Football Federation) UE L'Estartit |
| 14 | MF | Aitana Bonmatí | 18 January 1998 (aged 16) | | | (Royal Spanish Football Federation) FC Barcelona |
| 15 | DF | Cintia Montagut | 16 April 1998 (aged 15) | | | (Royal Spanish Football Federation) Valencia CF |
| 16 | DF | Queralt Gómez | 27 May 1997 (aged 16) | | | (Royal Spanish Football Federation) FC Barcelona |
| 17 | MF | Sandra Hernández | 25 May 1997 (aged 16) | | | (Royal Spanish Football Federation) CE Sant Gabriel |
| 18 | FW | Laura Domínguez | 12 August 1997 (aged 16) | | | (Royal Spanish Football Federation) Madrid CFF |
| 19 | MF | Maite Oroz | 25 March 1998 (aged 15) | | | (Royal Spanish Football Federation) CA Osasuna |
| 20 | MF | Angeles Carrión | 22 February 1997 (aged 17) | | | (Royal Spanish Football Federation) CFF Albacete |
| 21 | GK | Cristina Portomene | 5 April 1997 (aged 16) | | | (Royal Spanish Football Federation) CD Trobajo del Camino |

=== New Zealand ===
Coach: (Czech Republic) Jitka Klimková

| No. | Pos. | Player | Date of birth (age) | Caps | Goals | Club |
|---|---|---|---|---|---|---|
| 1 | GK | Emma Fulbrook | 25 November 1997 (aged 16) | | | (New Zealand Football) Waterside Karori AFC |
| 2 | DF | Geena Gross | 22 September 1997 (aged 16) | | | (New Zealand Football) Suburbs FC |
| 3 | DF | Hope Gilchrist | 5 March 1998 (aged 16) | | | (New Zealand Football) Waterside Karori AFC |
| 4 | DF | Elizabeth Anton | 12 December 1998 (aged 15) | | | (New Zealand Football) Lynn-Avon United |
| 5 | DF | Hanna English | 2 June 1997 (aged 16) | | | (New Zealand Football) Dunedin Technical |
| 6 | MF | Isabella Coombes | 5 November 1997 (aged 16) | | | (New Zealand Football) Claudelands Rovers |
| 7 | MF | Bella Kingi | 14 January 1998 (aged 16) | | | (New Zealand Football) Lynn-Avon United |
| 8 | MF | Daisy Cleverley | 30 April 1997 (aged 16) | | | (New Zealand Football) Forrest Hill Milford |
| 9 | FW | Martine Puketapu | 16 September 1997 (aged 16) | | | (New Zealand Football) Three Kings United |
| 10 | FW | Jade Parris | 26 September 1997 (aged 16) | | | (New Zealand Football) Metro FC |
| 11 | FW | Emily Oosterhof | 10 February 1997 (aged 17) | | | (New Zealand Football) Glenfield Rovers |
| 12 | DF | Sophie Stewart-Hobbs | 9 May 1998 (aged 15) | | | (New Zealand Football) Papamoa FC |
| 13 | FW | Paige Satchell | 10 April 1998 (aged 15) | | | (New Zealand Football) Rotorua United |
| 14 | DF | Karin Ingram | 31 May 1997 (aged 16) | | | (New Zealand Football) Massey University |
| 15 | MF | Whitney Hepburn | 16 October 1997 (aged 16) | | | (New Zealand Football) Coastal Spirit FC |
| 16 | FW | Sarah Morton | 28 August 1998 (aged 15) | | | (New Zealand Football) Maycenvale United |
| 17 | MF | Ashley Arquette | 26 December 1997 (aged 16) | | | (New Zealand Football) Havelock North Wanderers AFC |
| 18 | MF | Isabella Richards | 6 July 1997 (aged 16) | | | (New Zealand Football) Three Kings United |
| 19 | FW | Tayla Christensen | 31 August 1997 (aged 16) | | | (New Zealand Football) Claudelands Rovers |
| 20 | GK | Emily Hanrahan | 11 January 1998 (aged 16) | | | (New Zealand Football) Claudelands Rovers |
| 21 | GK | Abigail Roper | 31 January 1997 (aged 17) | | | (New Zealand Football) Fencibles United |

=== Paraguay ===
Coach: (Paraguay) Julio Gómez

| No. | Pos. | Player | Date of birth (age) | Caps | Goals | Club |
|---|---|---|---|---|---|---|
| 1 | GK | Heidi Salas | 20 March 1999 (aged 14) | | | (Paraguayan Football Association) Club Cerro Porteño |
| 2 | DF | Yennifer Álvarez | 14 March 1997 (aged 17) | | | (Paraguayan Football Association) Club Cerro Porteño |
| 3 | DF | Sheryl Barrios | 21 April 1997 (aged 16) | | | (Paraguayan Football Association) Universidad Autónoma de Asunción |
| 4 | DF | Natalia Genes | 10 March 1997 (aged 17) | | | (Paraguayan Football Association) CS Limpeño |
| 5 | DF | Analía Torres | 26 July 1997 (aged 16) | | | (Paraguayan Football Association) Universidad Autónoma de Asunción |
| 6 | MF | Lorena Alonso | 1 April 1998 (aged 15) | | | (Paraguayan Football Association) Universidad Autónoma de Asunción |
| 7 | MF | Fanny Godoy | 21 January 1998 (aged 16) | | | (Paraguayan Football Association) Universidad Autónoma de Asunción |
| 8 | MF | Jessica Aquino | 24 February 1998 (aged 16) | | | (Paraguayan Football Association) Colegio Natividad de Maria |
| 9 | FW | Jessica Martínez | 14 June 1999 (aged 14) | | | (Paraguayan Football Association) Club Olimpia |
| 10 | MF | Magalí Brizuela | 16 July 1997 (aged 16) | | | (Paraguayan Football Association) Club Cerro Porteño |
| 11 | FW | Griselda Garay | 11 December 1997 (aged 16) | | | (Paraguayan Football Association) Universidad Autónoma de Asunción |
| 12 | GK | Diana Salinas | 13 March 1998 (aged 16) | | | (Paraguayan Football Association) CS Limpeño |
| 13 | DF | Alexandra Perrone | 27 March 1997 (aged 16) | | | (Paraguayan Football Association) Colegio Cristo Rey |
| 14 | FW | Abdara Yubi | 14 August 1997 (aged 16) | | | (Paraguayan Football Association) Colegio del Sol |
| 15 | MF | Gabriela Amarilla | 24 June 1997 (aged 16) | | | (Paraguayan Football Association) Club Cerro Porteño |
| 16 | FW | Amara Safuan | 24 July 1997 (aged 16) | | | (Paraguayan Football Association) Colegio del Sol |
| 17 | MF | Camila González | 9 April 1999 (aged 14) | | | (Paraguayan Football Association) Universidad Autónoma de Asunción |
| 18 | MF | Shirley López | 26 June 1997 (aged 16) | | | (Paraguayan Football Association) Club Olimpia |
| 19 | MF | Evelyn Vera | 7 July 1998 (aged 15) | | | (Paraguayan Football Association) Sportivo Luqueño |
| 20 | MF | Laurie Cristaldo | 4 May 1997 (aged 16) | | | (Paraguayan Football Association) Universidad Autónoma de Asunción |
| 21 | GK | Natasha Martínez | 17 July 2000 (aged 13) | | | (Paraguayan Football Association) Club Olimpia |

=== Japan ===
Coach: (Japan) Asako Takakura

| No. | Pos. | Player | Date of birth (age) | Caps | Goals | Club |
|---|---|---|---|---|---|---|
| 1 | GK | Mamiko Matsumoto | 9 October 1997 (aged 16) | | | (Japan Football Association) Urawa Reds Diamonds |
| 2 | DF | Shiho Matsubara | 7 July 1997 (aged 16) | | | (Japan Football Association) Cerezo Osaka |
| 3 | DF | Hikaru Kitagawa | 10 May 1997 (aged 16) | | | (Japan Football Association) JFA Academy Fukushima |
| 4 | DF | Maho Hashinuma | 9 September 1997 (aged 16) | | | (Japan Football Association) JFA Academy Fukushima |
| 5 | DF | Nana Ichise | 4 August 1997 (aged 16) | | | (Japan Football Association) Tokiwagi Gakuen HS |
| 6 | DF | Asato Miyagawa | 24 February 1998 (aged 16) | | | (Japan Football Association) NTV Menina |
| 7 | FW | Rikako Kobayashi | 21 July 1997 (aged 16) | | | (Japan Football Association) Tokiwagi Gakuen HS |
| 8 | MF | Yui Hasegawa | 29 January 1997 (aged 17) | | | (Japan Football Association) NTV Beleza |
| 9 | FW | Miho Kamogawa | 27 August 1997 (aged 16) | | | (Japan Football Association) JEF United Ichihara Chiba |
| 10 | MF | Hina Sugita | 31 January 1997 (aged 17) | | | (Japan Football Association) Fujieda Junshin HS |
| 11 | MF | Meika Nishida | 16 November 1997 (aged 16) | | | (Japan Football Association) Cerezo Osaka |
| 12 | GK | Natsumi Asano | 14 April 1997 (aged 16) | | | (Japan Football Association) JFA Academy Fukushima |
| 13 | FW | Fuka Kono | 15 January 1998 (aged 16) | | | (Japan Football Association) Fujieda Junshin HS |
| 14 | FW | Rana Okuma | 23 December 1998 (aged 15) | | | (Japan Football Association) JFA Academy Fukushima |
| 15 | MF | Fuka Nagano | 9 March 1999 (aged 15) | | | (Japan Football Association) Urawa Reds Diamonds |
| 16 | DF | Yu Endo | 29 October 1997 (aged 16) | | | (Japan Football Association) Urawa Reds Diamonds |
| 17 | DF | Moeka Minami | 7 December 1998 (aged 15) | | | (Japan Football Association) Urawa Reds Diamonds |
| 18 | MF | Mizuka Sato | 19 September 1998 (aged 15) | | | (Japan Football Association) JEF United Ichihara Chiba |
| 19 | MF | Maki Hiratsuka | 11 August 1998 (aged 15) | | | (Japan Football Association) Seinan FC |
| 20 | FW | Mizuki Saihara | 2 December 1997 (aged 16) | | | (Japan Football Association) Angeviolet Hiroshima |
| 21 | GK | Yukari Morita | 5 February 1997 (aged 17) | | | (Japan Football Association) Osaka Toin HS |

== Group D ==
=== Mexico ===
Coach: (Mexico) Leonardo Cuéllar

| No. | Pos. | Player | Date of birth (age) | Caps | Goals | Club |
|---|---|---|---|---|---|---|
| 1 | GK | Emily Alvarado | 9 June 1998 (aged 15) | | | (United States Soccer Federation) Texas Rush |
| 2 | DF | Miriam García | 14 February 1998 (aged 16) | | | (Mexican Football Federation) Jalisco |
| 3 | DF | Vanessa Flores | 26 May 1997 (aged 16) | | | (United States Soccer Federation) Albion Hurricanes FC |
| 4 | DF | Rebeca Bernal | 31 August 1997 (aged 16) | | | (Mexican Football Federation) ITESM Monterrey |
| 5 | DF | Kimberly Rodriguez | 26 March 1999 (aged 14) | | | (United States Soccer Federation) Texas Rush |
| 6 | MF | Eva González | 22 April 1997 (aged 16) | | | (United States Soccer Federation) Dallas Texans |
| 7 | MF | Janae González | 3 March 1997 (aged 17) | | | (United States Soccer Federation) Southern California Blues |
| 8 | MF | Cinthia Huerta | 29 April 1998 (aged 15) | | | (Mexican Football Federation) Macrosoccer Femenil AC |
| 9 | FW | Aylin Villalobos | 2 October 1997 (aged 16) | | | (United States Soccer Federation) El Pasco Galacticas FC |
| 10 | MF | Belén Cruz | 7 November 1998 (aged 15) | | | (Mexican Football Federation) Tigres de Acapulco |
| 11 | FW | Jacqueline Crowther | 10 August 1997 (aged 16) | | | (United States Soccer Federation) Legends FC |
| 12 | GK | Miriam Aguirre | 29 January 1999 (aged 15) | | | (Mexican Football Federation) Macrosoccer Femenil AC |
| 13 | DF | Mónica Rodríguez | 3 August 1998 (aged 15) | | | (Mexican Football Federation) Galeana Morelos |
| 14 | DF | Arlett Tovar | 9 May 1997 (aged 16) | | | (Mexican Football Federation) CD Chivas del Guadalajara |
| 15 | DF | Gabriela Martínez | 25 March 1997 (aged 16) | | | (Mexican Football Federation) Escuela Americana Tampico |
| 16 | MF | Rubí Villegas | 28 August 1997 (aged 16) | | | (Mexican Football Federation) ITESM Puebla |
| 17 | MF | Natalia Villareal | 19 March 1998 (aged 15) | | | (Mexican Football Federation) Nuevo León |
| 18 | MF | Montserrat Hernández | 26 June 1999 (aged 14) | | | (Mexican Football Federation) CSD Atlas |
| 19 | FW | Jaquelin García Cruz | 23 December 1997 (aged 16) | | | (Mexican Football Federation) Lagartos FC |
| 20 | GK | Renata Masciarelli | 23 January 1997 (aged 17) | | | (Mexican Football Federation) CD Chivas del Guadalajara |
| 21 | FW | Viridiana Salazar | 2 January 1998 (aged 16) | | | (Mexican Football Federation) Quintana Roo |

=== China PR ===
Coach: (China) Gao Hong

| No. | Pos. | Player | Date of birth (age) | Caps | Goals | Club |
|---|---|---|---|---|---|---|
| 1 | GK | Pan Jingying | 7 August 1998 (aged 15) | | | (Chinese Football Association) Jiangsu Sainty FC |
| 2 | DF | Wang Ying | 18 November 1997 (aged 16) | | | (Chinese Football Association) Henan Jianye FC |
| 3 | MF | Wan Ruyi | 30 September 1997 (aged 16) | | | (Chinese Football Association) Jiangsu Sainty FC |
| 4 | MF | Liu Mengxue | 9 October 1997 (aged 16) | | | (Chinese Football Association) Jiangsu Sainty FC |
| 5 | FW | Zhao Yuxin | 29 April 1998 (aged 15) | | | (Chinese Football Association) Shaanxi Guoli FC |
| 6 | DF | Hu Yuanxin | 2 January 1997 (aged 17) | | | (Chinese Football Association) Hubei FC |
| 7 | MF | Xu Jiameng | 19 June 1998 (aged 15) | | | (Chinese Football Association) Jiangsu Sainty FC |
| 8 | MF | Liu Jing | 28 April 1998 (aged 15) | | | (Chinese Football Association) Shaanxi Guoli FC |
| 9 | MF | Liu Yan | 19 January 1997 (aged 17) | | | (Chinese Football Association) Shanghai Shenhua FC |
| 10 | FW | Wu Yue | 12 July 1997 (aged 16) | | | (Chinese Football Association) Anhui Jiufang FC |
| 11 | MF | Xiao Jingfang | 11 August 1997 (aged 16) | | | (Chinese Football Association) Hubei FC |
| 12 | FW | Yao Wei | 1 September 1997 (aged 16) | | | (Chinese Football Association) Hubei FC |
| 13 | DF | Fan Yuqiu | 2 October 1997 (aged 16) | | | (Chinese Football Association) Jiangxi Liansheng FC |
| 14 | MF | Tang Hui | 24 February 1998 (aged 16) | | | (Chinese Football Association) Hangzhou Greentown FC |
| 15 | DF | Chen Yudan | 5 October 1997 (aged 16) | | | (Chinese Football Association) Guangdong FC |
| 16 | MF | Wang Xueting | 24 January 1997 (aged 17) | | | (Chinese Football Association) Henan Jianye FC |
| 17 | DF | Cui Yuhan | 13 October 1997 (aged 16) | | | (Chinese Football Association) Jiangsu Sainty FC |
| 18 | GK | Peng Shimeng | 12 May 1998 (aged 15) | | | (Chinese Football Association) Jiangsu Sainty FC |
| 19 | MF | Qin Manman | 11 March 1997 (aged 17) | | | (Chinese Football Association) Hubei FC |
| 20 | DF | Dai Chenying | 15 February 1997 (aged 17) | | | (Chinese Football Association) Hubei FC |
| 21 | GK | Ma Li | 16 September 1997 (aged 16) | | | (Chinese Football Association) Henan Jianye FC |

=== Colombia ===
Coach: (Colombia) Fabian Taborda

| No. | Pos. | Player | Date of birth (age) | Caps | Goals | Club |
|---|---|---|---|---|---|---|
| 1 | GK | Mónica Flórez | 17 November 1997 (aged 16) | | | (Colombian Football Federation) Club Gol Star |
| 2 | DF | Mayra Valencia | 18 September 1997 (aged 16) | | | (Colombian Football Federation) Escuela Iván Darío Restrepo |
| 3 | DF | Andrea Malagon | 13 June 1997 (aged 16) | | | (Colombian Football Federation) LF Meta |
| 4 | DF | Ailyn Quiñones | 10 May 1997 (aged 16) | | | (Colombian Football Federation) CD Generaciones Palmiranas |
| 5 | DF | Sara Paez | 10 June 1998 (aged 15) | | | (Colombian Football Federation) Club Real Pasión |
| 6 | DF | Nancy Acosta | 11 December 1998 (aged 15) | | | (Colombian Football Federation) Club Futuro Soccer |
| 7 | MF | Maria Hurtado | 1 January 1997 (aged 17) | | | (Colombian Football Federation) Club Molino Viejo |
| 8 | MF | Myriam Alonso | 16 May 1997 (aged 16) | | | (Colombian Football Federation) Club Besser |
| 9 | FW | Valentina Restrepo | 30 August 1997 (aged 16) | | | (Colombian Football Federation) CD Formas Íntimas |
| 10 | MF | Angie Ortiz | 18 July 1997 (aged 16) | | | (Colombian Football Federation) LF Tolima |
| 11 | FW | Leidy Aspirilla | 18 April 1997 (aged 16) | | | (Colombian Football Federation) CD Generaciones Palmiranas |
| 12 | GK | Camila Arias | 21 September 1998 (aged 15) | | | (Colombian Football Federation) LF Tolima |
| 13 | FW | Valentina Carvajal | 21 February 1997 (aged 17) | | | (Colombian Football Federation) CD Carlos Sarmiento Lora |
| 14 | DF | Sara Pulecio | 27 September 1998 (aged 15) | | | (Colombian Football Federation) Club Gol Star |
| 15 | MF | Aura Hoyos | 16 April 1998 (aged 15) | | | (Colombian Football Federation) CD Formas Íntimas |
| 16 | MF | Natalia Carabali | 16 April 1997 (aged 16) | | | (Colombian Football Federation) Club Toritos |
| 17 | MF | Andrea Rodríguez | 6 July 1997 (aged 16) | | | (Colombian Football Federation) Club AFFYR |
| 18 | FW | Angie Castañeda | 4 February 1998 (aged 16) | | | (Colombian Football Federation) Club Boca Xeneises |
| 19 | MF | Angie Rodríguez | 1 January 1997 (aged 17) | | | (Colombian Football Federation) Club Cota |
| 20 | MF | Natalia Acuña | 26 September 1998 (aged 15) | | | (Colombian Football Federation) Club Futuro Soccer |
| 21 | GK | Sthefany Perlaza | 1 February 1997 (aged 17) | | | (Colombian Football Federation) CD Generaciones Palmiranas |

=== Nigeria ===
Coach: (Nigeria) Nikyu Bala

| No. | Pos. | Player | Date of birth (age) | Caps | Goals | Club |
|---|---|---|---|---|---|---|
| 1 | GK | Mercy Vincent | 19 May 1998 (aged 15) | | | (Nigeria Football Federation) Kogi Confluence FC |
| 2 | DF | Mary Ologbosere | 18 May 1999 (aged 14) | | | (Nigeria Football Federation) Ibom Angels FC |
| 3 | DF | Patience Dike | 11 October 1999 (aged 14) | | | (Nigeria Football Federation) COD United FC |
| 4 | MF | Ihuoma Onyebuchi | 10 December 1997 (aged 16) | | | (Nigeria Football Federation) Rivers Angels FC |
| 5 | DF | Ugochi Emenayo | 20 December 1997 (aged 16) | | | (Nigeria Football Federation) Nasarawa Amazons |
| 6 | DF | Esther Elijah | 6 February 1998 (aged 16) | | | (Nigeria Football Federation) Osun Babes FC |
| 7 | FW | Vivian Ikechukwu | 10 July 1997 (aged 16) | | | (Nigeria Football Federation) Real Dinamo FC |
| 8 | MF | Joy Bokiri | 29 December 1999 (aged 14) | | | (Nigeria Football Federation) Bayelsa Queens |
| 9 | MF | Aminat Yakubu | 25 December 1997 (aged 16) | | | (Nigeria Football Federation) Rivers Angels FC |
| 10 | MF | Tessy Biahwo | 15 November 1997 (aged 16) | | | (Nigeria Football Federation) Delta Queens FC |
| 11 | DF | Faith Alex | 14 February 1999 (aged 15) | | | (Nigeria Football Federation) Pelican Stars FC |
| 12 | DF | Joy Duru | 23 December 1999 (aged 14) | | | (Nigeria Football Federation) Nasarawa Amazons |
| 13 | DF | Ayomide Anibaba | 30 December 1997 (aged 16) | | | (Nigeria Football Federation) FC Robo |
| 14 | FW | Rasheedat Ajibade | 8 December 1999 (aged 14) | | | (Nigeria Football Federation) FC Robo |
| 15 | FW | Uchenna Kanu | 20 June 1997 (aged 16) | | | (Nigeria Football Federation) Pelican Stars FC |
| 16 | GK | Fubiana Briggs | 23 December 1999 (aged 14) | | | (Nigeria Football Federation) Pelican Stars FC |
| 17 | DF | Augustar Mene | 30 December 1997 (aged 16) | | | (Nigeria Football Federation) Nasarawa Amazons |
| 18 | FW | Cynthia Aku | 31 December 1999 (aged 14) | | | (Nigeria Football Federation) Rivers Angels FC |
| 19 | FW | Chinwendu Ihezuo | 30 April 1997 (aged 16) | | | (Nigeria Football Federation) Pelican Stars FC |
| 20 | MF | Eluemunor Ijeh | 29 November 1997 (aged 16) | | | (Nigeria Football Federation) Delta Queens FC |
| 21 | GK | Onyinyechukwu Okeke | 17 August 1998 (aged 15) | | | (Nigeria Football Federation) Inneh Queens FC |
