= 2016 FIFA U-17 Women's World Cup squads =

Squads for the 2016 FIFA U-17 Women's World Cup, held in Jordan, are as follows. Each competing federation submitted a 21-player squad to FIFA, which was published on 24 September 2016.

== Group A ==
=== Jordan ===
Coach: (England) Robbie Johnson

No.	Pos.	Player	Date of birth (age)	Club
1	GK	Rand Albustanji	24 June 2000 (aged 16)	(Jordan Football Association) Shabab Al Ordon
2	GK	Suzan Abuqorok	5 April 2001 (aged 15)	(Jordan Football Association) Amman
3	MF	Tala Al-Awwad	2 October 2000 (aged 15)	(United Arab Emirates Football Association) American Community School of AD
4	DF	Luna Sahloul	11 March 1999 (aged 17)	(Jordan Football Association) Orthodox Club
5	DF	Rahmeh Abzakh	30 March 1999 (aged 17)	(Jordan Football Association) Amman
6	FW	Zeina Fakhoury	3 January 2000 (aged 16)	(Jordan Football Association) Shabab Al Ordon
7	DF	Nour Zoqash	1 September 1999 (aged 17)	(Jordan Football Association) Orthodox Club
8	DF	Alanoud Ghazi	18 May 1999 (aged 17)	(Jordan Football Association) Amman
9	FW	Leen Albtoush	20 July 2001 (aged 15)	(Jordan Football Association) Amman
10	FW	Sarah Abu-Sabbah	27 October 1999 (aged 16)	(German Football Association) Bayer 04 Leverkusen
11	MF	Tasneem Abu-Rob	14 November 2000 (aged 15)	(Jordan Football Association) Orthodox Club
12	GK	Joud Alshanty	26 July 1999 (aged 17)	(Jordan Football Association) Orthodox Club
13	DF	Jeeda Alnaber	13 June 1999 (aged 17)	(Jordan Football Association) Shabab Al Ordon
14	MF	Rama Awad	23 May 2001 (aged 15)	(Jordan Football Association) Amman
15	MF	Tasneem Isleem	4 March 2001 (aged 15)	(Jordan Football Association) Amman
16	MF	Rouzbahan Fraij	7 April 2000 (aged 16)	(Jordan Football Association) International School of Choueifat
17	DF	Farah Alzaben	6 August 1999 (aged 17)	(Jordan Football Association) Orthodox Club
18	FW	Joel Srouji	17 December 2000 (aged 15)	(Jordan Football Association) ASG
19	MF	Noor Abukishk	23 March 1999 (aged 17)	(Egyptian Football Association) Wadi Degla FC
20	FW	Yasmeen Zabian	1 May 2000 (aged 16)	(Jordan Football Association) International Academy Amman
21	MF	Jana Abu Ghosh	8 June 2001 (aged 15)	(Jordan Football Association) Orthodox Club

=== Spain ===
Coach: Toña Is

No.	Pos.	Player	Date of birth (age)	Club
1	GK	Noelia Ramos	10 February 1999 (aged 17)	(Royal Spanish Football Federation) UD Granadilla Tenerife Sur
2	DF	Ona Batlle	10 June 1999 (aged 17)	(Royal Spanish Football Federation) FC Barcelona
3	DF	Berta Pujadas	9 April 2000 (aged 16)	(Royal Spanish Football Federation) FC Barcelona
4	DF	Laia Aleixandri	25 August 2000 (aged 16)	(Royal Spanish Football Federation) FC Barcelona
5	DF	Natalia Ramos	10 February 1999 (aged 17)	(Royal Spanish Football Federation) UD Granadilla Tenerife Sur
6	MF	Silvia Rubio	12 October 2000 (aged 15)	(Royal Spanish Football Federation) Madrid CFF
7	FW	Oihane Hernández	4 May 2000 (aged 16)	(Royal Spanish Football Federation) Athletic Club Bilbao
8	FW	Leyre Monente	15 February 2000 (aged 16)	(Royal Spanish Football Federation) Athletic Club Bilbao
9	FW	Lorena Navarro	11 November 2000 (aged 15)	(Royal Spanish Football Federation) Madrid CFF
10	MF	Paula Fernández	1 July 1999 (aged 17)	(Royal Spanish Football Federation) FC Barcelona
11	MF	Candela Andújar	26 March 2000 (aged 16)	(Royal Spanish Football Federation) FC Barcelona
12	DF	Lucía Rodríguez	24 May 1999 (aged 17)	(Royal Spanish Football Federation) CD Tacón
13	GK	Catalina Coll	23 April 2001 (aged 15)	(Royal Spanish Football Federation) UD Collerense
14	MF	Nerea Eizaguirre	4 January 2000 (aged 16)	(Royal Spanish Football Federation) Real Sociedad
15	MF	Laura Gutiérrez	18 April 2000 (aged 16)	(Royal Spanish Football Federation) Oviedo Moderno CF
16	MF	Damaris Egurrola	26 August 1999 (aged 17)	(Royal Spanish Football Federation) Athletic Club Bilbao
17	DF	María Blanco	15 August 1999 (aged 17)	(Royal Spanish Football Federation) Athletic Club Bilbao
18	FW	Eva Navarro	27 January 2001 (aged 15)	(Royal Spanish Football Federation) Sporting Plaza de Argel
19	DF	Anna Torrodà	21 January 2000 (aged 16)	(Royal Spanish Football Federation) FC Barcelona
20	FW	Clàudia Pina	12 August 2001 (aged 15)	(Royal Spanish Football Federation) FC Barcelona
23	GK	Maria Subies	20 April 2000 (aged 16)	(Royal Spanish Football Federation) CF Reus Deportiu

=== Mexico ===
Coach: Christopher Cuéllar

No.	Pos.	Player	Date of birth (age)	Club
1	GK	Miriam Aguirre	29 January 1999 (age 27)	(Mexican Football Federation) Macro Soccer
2	DF	Ashley Soto	30 December 1999 (age 26)	(United States Soccer Federation) So Cal Blues SC
3	DF	Jazmín Enrigue	9 May 2000 (age 26)	(Mexican Football Federation) Centro de formación de Guadalajara
4	DF	Kimberly Rodriguez	26 March 1999 (age 27)	(United States Soccer Federation) Texas Rush
5	DF	Jimena López	30 January 1999 (age 27)	(Mexican Football Federation) Saint Stephen's
6	MF	Mia Villegas	31 May 2000 (age 25)	(United States Soccer Federation) Davis Legacy SC
7	MF	Dayana Cázares	30 December 1999 (age 26)	(Mexican Football Federation) Scratch do Oro
8	MF	Alexia Delgado	9 December 1999 (age 26)	(Mexican Football Federation) Colegio Subire
9	FW	Daniela Espinosa	13 July 1999 (age 26)	(Mexican Football Federation) Baja California Sur
10	FW	Montserrat Hernández	26 June 1999 (age 26)	(Mexican Football Federation) Centro de formación de Guadalajara
11	MF	Lizbeth Ovalle	19 October 1999 (age 26)	(Mexican Football Federation) Seleccion Aguascalientes
12	GK	Kelsey Brann	8 February 1999 (age 27)	(United States Soccer Federation) Texas Rush
13	DF	Akemi Yokoyama	28 October 1999 (age 26)	(Mexican Football Federation) ACAFUT
14	DF	Reyna Reyes	16 February 2001 (age 25)	(United States Soccer Federation) FC Dallas
15	DF	Marianna Maldonado	5 August 1999 (age 26)	(United States Soccer Federation) Slammers FC
16	MF	Vanessa González	3 June 1999 (age 26)	(Mexican Football Federation) Centro de formación Monterrey
17	MF	Luisa Delgado	20 July 2000 (age 25)	(United States Soccer Federation) Real So Cal
18	FW	Verónica Ávalos	20 June 1999 (age 26)	(United States Soccer Federation) San Diego Surf SC
19	FW	Gabriela Juárez	13 April 2000 (age 26)	(United States Soccer Federation) Slammers FC
20	GK	Wendy Toledo	13 September 2000 (age 25)	(Mexican Football Federation) Instituto Britanico de Torreon
21	MF	Celiana Torres	28 March 2000 (age 26)	(United States Soccer Federation) Chicago Sockers

=== New Zealand ===
Coach: Gareth Turbull

No.	Pos.	Player	Date of birth (age)	Club
1	GK	Anna Leat	26 June 2001 (aged 15)	(New Zealand Football) East Coast Bays AFC
2	DF	Claudia Bunge	21 September 1999 (aged 17)	(New Zealand Football) Glenfield Rovers AFC
3	DF	Ally Toailoa	19 April 1999 (aged 17)	(New Zealand Football) Papatoetoe AFC
4	DF	Rebecca Lake	13 May 1999 (aged 17)	(New Zealand Football) Coastal Spirit FC
5	DF	Michaela Foster	9 January 1999 (aged 17)	(New Zealand Football) Claudelands Rovers FC
6	MF	Nicole Mettam	7 February 2000 (aged 16)	(New Zealand Football) Eastern Suburbs AFC
7	FW	Hannah Blake	5 May 2000 (aged 16)	(New Zealand Football) Three Kings United
8	MF	Malia Steinmetz	18 January 1999 (aged 17)	(New Zealand Football) Forrest Hill Milford United AFC
9	FW	Sam Tawharu	18 January 1999 (aged 17)	(New Zealand Football) Forrest Hill Milford United AFC
10	MF	Grace Jale	10 April 1999 (aged 17)	(New Zealand Football) Eastern Suburbs AFC
11	FW	Jacqui Hand	19 February 1999 (aged 17)	(New Zealand Football) Eastern Suburbs AFC
12	GK	Nadia Olla	7 February 2000 (aged 16)	(New Zealand Football) Norwest United AFC
13	MF	Sarah Krystman	15 June 1999 (aged 17)	(New Zealand Football) Claudelands Rovers FC
14	DF	Amber Phillips	14 July 1999 (aged 17)	(New Zealand Football) Palmerston North Marist
15	DF	Fran Grange	18 October 1999 (aged 16)	(New Zealand Football) Wellington United AFC
16	MF	Alosi Bloomfield	17 May 1999 (aged 17)	(New Zealand Football) Three Kings United
17	FW	Emma Main	19 October 1999 (aged 16)	(New Zealand Football) Upper Hutt City FC
18	MF	Rose Morton	2 May 2000 (aged 16)	(New Zealand Football) Palmerston North Marist
19	FW	Maggie Jenkins	14 June 2001 (aged 15)	(New Zealand Football) Wellington United AFC
20	DF	Saskia Vosper	1 June 1999 (aged 17)	(New Zealand Football) Forrest Hill Milford United AFC
21	GK	Ashleigh Emery	11 March 1999 (aged 17)	(New Zealand Football) Western Springs AFC

== Group B ==
=== Venezuela ===
Coach: (Panama) Kenneth Zseremata

No.	Pos.	Player	Date of birth (age)	Club
1	GK	Alexa Castro	20 May 2000 (aged 16)	(Venezuelan Football Federation) Deportivo Anzoátegui
2	DF	Verónica Herrera	14 January 2000 (aged 16)	(Venezuelan Football Federation) Deportivo La Guaira
3	DF	Hilary Vergara	20 August 1999 (aged 17)	(Venezuelan Football Federation) ACD Lara
4	DF	Sandra Luzardo	18 July 1999 (aged 17)	(Venezuelan Football Federation) Caucheros de Mérida
5	MF	Iceis Briceño	9 June 1999 (aged 17)	(Venezuelan Football Federation) Fufem Aragua
6	DF	Gladysmar Rojas	17 July 2000 (aged 16)	(Venezuelan Football Federation) Deportivo Cojedes
7	MF	Olimar Castillo	26 January 1999 (aged 17)	(Venezuelan Football Federation) Atletico Yara
8	MF	Dayana Rodríguez	20 October 2001 (aged 14)	(Venezuelan Football Federation) Estudiantes de Guarico FC
9	FW	Deyna Castellanos	18 April 1999 (aged 17)	(United States Soccer Federation) Florida State Univ.
10	FW	Yerliane Moreno	13 October 2000 (aged 15)	(Venezuelan Football Federation) Zamora FC
11	MF	Yohanli Maraguacare	18 June 2000 (aged 16)	(Venezuelan Football Federation) Deportivo Anzoátegui
12	GK	Yorbelis Sánchez	27 October 2001 (aged 14)	(Venezuelan Football Federation) Atletico Yara
13	GK	Nayluisa Cáceres	18 November 1999 (aged 16)	(Venezuelan Football Federation) Zamora FC
14	MF	María García	14 October 1999 (aged 16)	(Venezuelan Football Federation) Caracas FC
15	DF	Heliamar Alvarado	19 December 2001 (aged 14)	(Venezuelan Football Federation) Atletico Yara
16	MF	Daniuska Rodríguez	4 January 1999 (aged 17)	(Venezuelan Football Federation) AFF San Diego
17	MF	Nikol González	29 March 1999 (aged 17)	(Venezuelan Football Federation) AFF San Diego
18	MF	María Cazorla	3 December 2001 (aged 14)	(Venezuelan Football Federation) Academia Puerto Cabello Te Quiero
19	FW	Nohelis Coronel	6 December 1999 (aged 16)	(Venezuelan Football Federation) ACD Lara
20	MF	Jeismar Cabeza	23 September 1999 (aged 17)	(Venezuelan Football Federation) Escuela de Futbol Juan Arango
21	DF	Naiyerlyn Ropero	14 February 1999 (aged 17)	(Venezuelan Football Federation) FC Independente La Fria

=== Germany ===
Coach: Anouschka Bernhard

No.	Pos.	Player	Date of birth (age)	Club
1	GK	Leonie Doegel	20 February 1999 (aged 17)	(German Football Association) Bayer 04 Leverkusen
2	DF	Sarai Linder	26 October 1999 (aged 16)	(German Football Association) TSG 1899 Hoffenheim
3	DF	Caroline Siems	9 May 1999 (aged 17)	(German Football Association) 1. FFC Turbine Potsdam
4	DF	Sophia Kleinherne	12 April 2000 (aged 16)	(German Football Association) FSV Gütersloh 2009
5	DF	Tanja Pawollek	18 January 1999 (aged 17)	(German Football Association) 1. FFC Frankfurt
6	FW	Vanessa Ziegler	16 January 1999 (aged 17)	(German Football Association) SC Freiburg
7	MF	Giulia Gwinn	2 July 1999 (aged 17)	(German Football Association) SC Freiburg
8	MF	Kristin Koegel	21 September 1999 (aged 17)	(German Football Association) VfL Sindelfingen
9	FW	Gina Chmielinski	7 June 2000 (aged 16)	(German Football Association) 1. FFC Turbine Potsdam
10	MF	Janina Minge	11 June 1999 (aged 17)	(German Football Association) SC Freiburg
11	MF	Marie Müller	25 July 2000 (aged 16)	(German Football Association) VfL Bochum
12	GK	Janina Leitzig	16 April 1999 (aged 17)	(German Football Association) TSG 1899 Hoffenheim
13	MF	Meret Wittje	10 July 1999 (aged 17)	(German Football Association) VfL Wolfsburg
14	DF	Anna Hausdorff	26 April 2000 (aged 16)	(German Football Association) FC Eintracht Bamberg 2010
15	MF	Sydney Lohmann	19 June 2000 (aged 16)	(German Football Association) FC Bayern Munich
16	FW	Annalena Rieke	10 January 1999 (aged 17)	(German Football Association) FF USV Jena
17	MF	Verena Wieder	26 June 2000 (aged 16)	(German Football Association) FC Bayern Munich
18	FW	Klara Bühl	7 December 2000 (aged 15)	(German Football Association) SC Freiburg
19	MF	Lena Oberdorf	19 December 2001 (aged 14)	(German Football Association) TSG Sprockhövel
20	MF	Lisa Schöppl	11 January 2000 (aged 16)	(German Football Association) VfL Wolfsburg
21	GK	Lisa Klostermann	28 May 1999 (aged 17)	(German Football Association) FSV Gevelsberg

=== Cameroon ===
Head coach: Minkreo Birwe

No.	Pos.	Player	Date of birth (age)	Club
1	GK	Carole Mimboe	15 January 1999 (aged 17)	(Cameroonian Football Federation) Louves Minproff
2	MF	Raissa Adama	29 December 1999 (aged 16)	(Cameroonian Football Federation) Social Mbam
3	DF	Dolores Tsadjia	9 March 1999 (aged 17)	(Cameroonian Football Federation) AS Green City Filles de Yaounde
4	DF	Claudia Dabda	1 July 2001 (aged 15)	(Cameroonian Football Federation) ASFF du Diamaré de Maroua
5	DF	Eni Kuchambi	2 April 1999 (aged 17)	(Cameroonian Football Federation) Gentile Ladies de Bamenda
6	MF	Viviane Mefire	19 December 2001 (aged 14)	(Cameroonian Football Federation) Canon
7	FW	Alice Djientieu	13 November 2001 (aged 14)	(Cameroonian Football Federation) AS Green City Filles de Yaounde
8	MF	Soline Djoubi	23 December 1999 (aged 16)	(Cameroonian Football Federation) Canon
9	FW	Alexandra Takounda	7 July 2000 (aged 16)	(Cameroonian Football Federation) Eclair FC de Saa
10	FW	Evanick Touta	2 April 1999 (aged 17)	(Cameroonian Football Federation) Louves Minproff
11	FW	Ruphine Beyina	20 July 1999 (aged 17)	(Cameroonian Football Federation) AS Green City Filles de Yaounde
12	MF	Rose Priso	1 January 2000 (aged 16)	(Cameroonian Football Federation) Louves Minproff
13	DF	Adeline Yami	12 February 2000 (aged 16)	(Cameroonian Football Federation) Amazone Fap de Yaounde
14	MF	Elodie Metho	10 March 2000 (aged 16)	(Cameroonian Football Federation) Social Mbam
15	DF	Reine Ambessegue	3 May 2000 (aged 16)	(Cameroonian Football Federation) Social Mbam
16	GK	Ange Bawou	12 February 2000 (aged 16)	(Cameroonian Football Federation) Social Mbam
17	DF	Moussa Zouwairatou	12 June 2001 (aged 15)	(Cameroonian Football Federation) Vent du Nord de Garoua
18	MF	Linda Tchomte	24 March 2001 (aged 15)	(Cameroonian Football Federation) AS Green City Filles de Yaounde
19	DF	Natatcha Elam Ekosso	5 December 2001 (aged 14)	(Cameroonian Football Federation) Vent du Nord de Garoua
20	DF	Michele Moumazin	15 July 2001 (aged 15)	(Cameroonian Football Federation) Panthère Security Filles de Garoua
21	GK	Hermine Nowou	17 August 2001 (aged 15)	(Cameroonian Football Federation) Binam FC de Bafoussam

=== Canada ===
Coach: (England) Beverly Priestman

No.	Pos.	Player	Date of birth (age)	Club
1	GK	Lysianne Proulx	17 April 1999 (aged 17)	(Canadian Soccer Association) CS Roussillon
2	DF	Emma Regan	28 January 2000 (aged 16)	(Canadian Soccer Association) Vancouver Whitecaps FC Girls Elite REX
3	DF	Julia Grosso	29 August 2000 (aged 16)	(Canadian Soccer Association) Vancouver Whitecaps FC Girls Elite REX
4	MF	Marika Guay	17 January 2000 (aged 16)	(Canadian Soccer Association) Lakeshore SC
5	FW	Deanne Rose	3 March 1999 (aged 17)	(Canadian Soccer Association) Scarborough GS United
6	DF	Ashley Cathro	19 January 2000 (aged 16)	(Canadian Soccer Association) Vancouver Whitecaps FC Girls Elite REX
7	FW	Mikayla Dayes	29 September 1999 (aged 17)	(Canadian Soccer Association) Woodbridge SC
8	MF	Sarah Stratigakis	7 March 1999 (aged 17)	(Canadian Soccer Association) Aurora United FC
9	FW	Jordyn Huitema	8 May 2001 (aged 15)	(Canadian Soccer Association) Vancouver Whitecaps FC Girls Elite REX
10	MF	Vital Kats	18 November 1999 (aged 16)	(Canadian Soccer Association) Scarborough GS United
11	FW	Jayde Riviere	22 January 2001 (aged 15)	(Canadian Soccer Association) Markham SC
12	FW	Lauren Raimondo	25 March 1999 (aged 17)	(Canadian Soccer Association) Unionville Milliken SC
13	DF	Samantha Chang	13 July 2000 (aged 16)	(Canadian Soccer Association) Ontario REX
14	MF	Caitlin Shaw	20 July 2001 (aged 15)	(Canadian Soccer Association) Vancouver Whitecaps FC Girls Elite REX
15	DF	Hannah Taylor	7 June 1999 (aged 17)	(United States Soccer Federation) Eastside G98
16	MF	Anyssa Ibrahim	8 February 1999 (aged 17)	(Canadian Soccer Association) Soccer Terrebonne
17	FW	Florence Laroche	22 April 2000 (aged 16)	(Canadian Soccer Association) Lakeshore SC
18	GK	Marissa Zucchetto	23 March 1999 (aged 17)	(Canadian Soccer Association) Aurora United FC
19	DF	Nadège L'Espérance	30 March 1999 (aged 17)	(Canadian Soccer Association) Lakeshore SC
20	MF	Kaela Hansen	13 April 2000 (aged 16)	(Canadian Soccer Association) Vancouver Whitecaps FC Girls Elite REX
21	GK	Sophie Guilmette	24 March 2001 (aged 15)	(Canadian Soccer Association) Lakeshore SC

== Group C ==
=== Nigeria ===
Coach: Nikyu Bala

No.	Pos.	Player	Date of birth (age)	Club
1	GK	Chiamaka Nnadozie	8 December 2000 (aged 15)	(Nigeria Football Federation) Rivers Angels F.C.
2	DF	Abidemi Ibe	27 December 1999 (aged 16)	(Nigeria Football Federation) Ibom Angels FC
3	DF	Patience Dike	11 October 1999 (aged 16)	(Nigeria Football Federation) C.O.D. United FC
4	MF	Christy Ucheibe	25 December 2000 (aged 15)	(Nigeria Football Federation) Capital City Dove FC
5	DF	Catherine Kenneth	21 November 1999 (aged 16)	(Nigeria Football Federation) Rivers Angels F.C.
6	DF	Esther Adeboye	26 May 2000 (aged 16)	(Nigeria Football Federation) Rivers Angels F.C.
7	MF	Peace Efih	5 August 2000 (aged 16)	(Nigeria Football Federation) Edo Queens FC
8	FW	Oghenebrume Ikekhua	28 June 2001 (aged 15)	(Nigeria Football Federation) Delta Queens F.C.
9	FW	Mercy Omokwo	4 February 2000 (aged 16)	(Nigeria Football Federation) Abia Angels FC
10	FW	Rasheedat Ajibade	8 December 1999 (aged 16)	(Nigeria Football Federation) FC Robo
11	FW	Arit Itu	31 December 2000 (aged 15)	(Nigeria Football Federation) Rivers Angels F.C.
12	DF	Akudo Ogbonna	9 April 2000 (aged 16)	(Nigeria Football Federation) FC Robo
13	DF	Joy Michael	6 August 2001 (aged 15)	(Nigeria Football Federation) Young Talent FC
14	FW	Chidinma Okeke	11 August 2000 (aged 16)	(Nigeria Football Federation) FC Robo
15	DF	Opeyemi Sunday	12 July 1999 (aged 17)	(Nigeria Football Federation) Sunshine Queens F.C.
16	GK	Christiana Obia	28 February 2001 (aged 15)	(Nigeria Football Federation) Martin White Dove FC
17	MF	Folashade Ijamilusi	30 May 2001 (aged 15)	(Nigeria Football Federation) Spring Soca Academy
18	FW	Cynthia Aku	31 December 1999 (aged 16)	(Nigeria Football Federation) Rivers Angels F.C.
19	DF	Happiness Titus	13 April 2000 (aged 16)	(Nigeria Football Federation) Greater Tomorrow Academy
20	FW	Mary-Ann Ezenagu	25 January 2001 (aged 15)	(Nigeria Football Federation) Delta Queens F.C.
21	GK	Agatha Thompson	9 April 2001 (aged 15)	(Nigeria Football Federation) Young Talent FC

=== Brazil ===
Coach: Luizão

No.	Pos.	Player	Date of birth (age)	Club
1	GK	Stefane	12 May 1999 (aged 17)	(Brazilian Football Confederation) Team Chicago Brasil
2	DF	Isabella Fernandes	18 December 1999 (aged 16)	(Brazilian Football Confederation) Valinhos FC
3	DF	Tainara	21 April 1999 (aged 17)	(Brazilian Football Confederation) São Francisco EC
4	DF	Thaís Regina	27 March 1999 (aged 17)	(Brazilian Football Confederation) Acadêmica Vitória
5	MF	Angelina	26 January 2000 (aged 16)	(Brazilian Football Confederation) CR Vasco da Gama
6	DF	Thais Reiss	9 December 1999 (aged 16)	(Brazilian Football Confederation) Escola Coxa (Abranches)
7	FW	Jaqueline	31 March 2000 (aged 16)	(Brazilian Football Confederation) Portuguesa
8	MF	Raquel	20 February 2000 (aged 16)	(Brazilian Football Confederation) Santos FC
9	FW	Ana Vitória	6 March 2000 (aged 16)	(Brazilian Football Confederation) Academia Futebol Clube
10	MF	Micaelly	30 September 2000 (aged 16)	(Brazilian Football Confederation) EC Iranduba da Amazônia
11	FW	Kerolin	17 November 1999 (aged 16)	(Brazilian Football Confederation) Valinhos FC
12	GK	Kemelli Trugilho	13 March 1999 (aged 17)	(Brazilian Football Confederation) Criciúma EC
13	DF	Juliana	23 March 2000 (aged 16)	(Brazilian Football Confederation) Ferroviária
14	DF	Camila	5 December 2000 (aged 15)	(Brazilian Football Confederation) Valinhos FC
15	MF	Isabela Alvares	22 May 1999 (aged 17)	(Brazilian Football Confederation) Ceilândia EC
16	FW	Laíssa	10 August 1999 (aged 17)	(Brazilian Football Confederation) Ceilândia EC
17	FW	Majhu	1 August 2000 (aged 16)	(Brazilian Football Confederation) Inter de Lages
18	MF	Bianca	22 April 2000 (aged 16)	(United States Soccer Federation) San Diego Surf SC
19	FW	Nycole Raysla	26 March 2000 (aged 16)	(Brazilian Football Confederation) Ceilândia EC
20	MF	Pelé	16 July 1999 (aged 17)	(Brazilian Football Confederation) Inter de Lages
21	GK	Nicole	13 April 2000 (aged 16)	(Brazilian Football Confederation) Criciúma EC

=== England ===
Coach: (England) John Griffiths

No.	Pos.	Player	Date of birth (age)	Club
1	GK	Ellie Roebuck	23 September 1999 (aged 17)	(The Football Association) Manchester City W.F.C.
2	DF	Flo Allen	13 August 1999 (aged 17)	(The Football Association) Bristol City W.F.C.
3	DF	Taylor Hinds	25 April 1999 (aged 17)	(The Football Association) Arsenal L.F.C.
4	MF	Hollie Olding	3 January 1999 (aged 17)	(The Football Association) Chelsea L.F.C.
5	DF	Grace Smith	20 January 1999 (aged 17)	(The Football Association) Aston Villa L.F.C.
6	DF	Lotte Wubben-Moy	11 January 1999 (aged 17)	(The Football Association) Arsenal L.F.C.
7	FW	Alessia Russo	8 February 1999 (aged 17)	(The Football Association) Chelsea L.F.C.
8	MF	Laura Hooper	5 July 1999 (aged 17)	(The Football Association) Arsenal L.F.C.
9	FW	Ellie Brazil	10 January 1999 (aged 17)	(The Football Association) Birmingham City L.F.C.
10	FW	Georgia Stanway	3 January 1999 (aged 17)	(The Football Association) Manchester City W.F.C.
11	FW	Niamh Charles	21 June 1999 (aged 17)	(The Football Association) Liverpool L.F.C.
12	DF	Anna Patten	20 April 1999 (aged 17)	(The Football Association) Arsenal L.F.C.
13	GK	Katie Startup	28 January 1999 (aged 17)	(The Football Association) Chelsea L.F.C.
14	DF	Kelsey Pearson	10 October 1999 (aged 16)	(The Football Association) Blackburn Rovers L.F.C.
15	DF	Lois Joel	2 June 1999 (aged 17)	(The Football Association) Chelsea L.F.C.
16	FW	Ella Toone	2 September 1999 (aged 17)	(The Football Association) Manchester City W.F.C.
17	FW	Alison Black	9 January 2000 (aged 16)	(The Football Association) Sheffield F.C. Ladies
18	MF	Anna Filbey	11 October 1999 (aged 16)	(The Football Association) Arsenal L.F.C.
19	MF	Jessie Jones	12 May 1999 (aged 17)	(The Football Association) Yeovil Town L.F.C.
20	MF	Connie Scofield	26 May 1999 (aged 17)	(The Football Association) Birmingham City L.F.C.
21	GK	Georgia Valentine	7 October 1999 (aged 16)	(The Football Association) Reading F.C. Women

=== North Korea ===
Coach: Jong Bok Sin

No.	Pos.	Player	Date of birth (age)	Club
1	GK	Ok Kum-ju	5 May 1999 (aged 17)	(DPR Korea Football Association) Naegohyang SC
2	DF	Jon Yun-sim	1 January 1999 (aged 17)	(DPR Korea Football Association) Sobaeksu SC
3	DF	Ri Kum-hyang	22 April 2001 (aged 15)	(DPR Korea Football Association) Naegohyang SC
4	MF	Ri Yong-mi	26 January 2000 (aged 16)	(DPR Korea Football Association) Naegohyang SC
5	MF	Ri Song-a	22 June 1999 (aged 17)	(Japan Football Association) Cerezo Osaka Sakai Ladies
6	MF	Pyon Un-gyong	1 January 2001 (aged 15)	(DPR Korea Football Association) April 25 SC
7	MF	Ko Kyong-hui	3 September 2001 (aged 15)	(DPR Korea Football Association) Ryomyong SC
8	DF	Choe Un-chong	8 January 2001 (aged 15)	(DPR Korea Football Association) Ryomyong SC
9	MF	Kim Pom-ui	2 February 1999 (aged 17)	(DPR Korea Football Association) Sobaeksu SC
10	FW	Ri Hae-yon	10 January 1999 (aged 17)	(DPR Korea Football Association) April 25 SC
11	MF	Kim Jong-sim	30 September 1999 (aged 17)	(DPR Korea Football Association) Pyongyang City SC
12	MF	Pak Hyon-jong	12 June 2000 (aged 16)	(DPR Korea Football Association) Naegohyang SC
13	FW	Kim Hyang-mi	12 January 1999 (aged 17)	(DPR Korea Football Association) Sobaeksu SC
14	FW	Sung Hyang-sim	2 December 1999 (aged 16)	(DPR Korea Football Association) Pyongyang City SC
15	MF	Jang Suk-yong	1 August 1999 (aged 17)	(DPR Korea Football Association) Amrokgang SC
16	MF	Ri Un-jong	6 November 1999 (aged 16)	(DPR Korea Football Association) Sobaeksu SC
17	DF	Pak Hye-gyong	7 November 2001 (aged 14)	(DPR Korea Football Association) Ryomyong SC
18	GK	Kim Pok-gyong	3 December 2001 (aged 14)	(DPR Korea Football Association) April 25 SC
19	FW	Ja Un-yong	11 August 2001 (aged 15)	(DPR Korea Football Association) April 25 SC
20	MF	An Kuk-hyang	25 March 2001 (aged 15)	(DPR Korea Football Association) Ryomyong SC
21	GK	Kim Hyang	8 January 2001 (aged 15)	(DPR Korea Football Association) Sobaeksu SC

== Group D ==
=== United States ===
Coach: Brian Snow

No.	Pos.	Player	Date of birth (age)	Club
1	GK	Laurel Ivory	28 August 1999 (aged 17)	(United States Soccer Federation) West Florida Flames
2	MF	Jordan Canniff	27 July 2001 (aged 15)	(United States Soccer Federation) Richmond United
3	FW	Sophia Smith	10 August 2000 (aged 16)	(United States Soccer Federation) Real Colorado
4	DF	Naomi Girma	14 June 2000 (aged 16)	(United States Soccer Federation) Central Valley Crossfire
5	DF	Karina Rodriguez	2 March 1999 (aged 17)	(United States Soccer Federation) So Cal Blues SC
6	DF	Emily Smith	10 February 1999 (aged 17)	(United States Soccer Federation) De Anza Force
7	MF	Alexa Spaanstra	1 February 2000 (aged 16)	(United States Soccer Federation) Michigan Hawks
8	MF	Brianna Pinto	24 May 2000 (aged 16)	(United States Soccer Federation) CASL Elite
9	DF	Kiara Pickett	30 April 1999 (aged 17)	(United States Soccer Federation) Eagles SC
10	FW	Ashley Sanchez	16 March 1999 (aged 17)	(United States Soccer Federation) So Cal Blues SC
11	DF	Kate Wiesner	11 February 2001 (aged 15)	(United States Soccer Federation) Slammers FC
12	GK	Meagan McCelland	5 August 2000 (aged 16)	(United States Soccer Federation) PDA
13	DF	Izzy Rodriguez	13 April 1999 (aged 17)	(United States Soccer Federation) Michigan Hawks
14	FW	Civana Kuhlmann	14 April 1999 (aged 17)	(United States Soccer Federation) Colorado Rush
15	DF	Kennedy Wesley	8 March 2001 (aged 15)	(United States Soccer Federation) So Cal Blues SC
16	MF	Sydney Zandi	28 May 1999 (aged 17)	(United States Soccer Federation) Penn Fusion
17	MF	Lia Godfrey	8 November 2001 (aged 14)	(United States Soccer Federation) Jacksonville Armada
18	MF	Jaelin Howell	21 November 1999 (aged 16)	(United States Soccer Federation) Real Colorado
19	FW	Adrienne Richardson	22 January 1999 (aged 17)	(United States Soccer Federation) Minnesota Thunder
20	MF	Frankie Tagliaferri	18 January 1999 (aged 17)	(United States Soccer Federation) PDA
21	GK	Hillary Beall	27 January 1999 (aged 17)	(United States Soccer Federation) So Cal Blues SC

=== Paraguay ===
Coach: Nelson Basualdo

No.	Pos.	Player	Date of birth (age)	Club
1	GK	Heidi Salas	20 March 1999 (aged 17)	(Paraguayan Football Association) Club Cerro Porteño
2	DF	Dirse Alcaraz	28 April 1999 (aged 17)	(Paraguayan Football Association) Club Olimpia
3	DF	María Vecca	24 May 1999 (aged 17)	(Paraguayan Football Association) CD Capiatá
4	DF	Daysy Bareiro	19 January 2001 (aged 15)	(Paraguayan Football Association) Club Cerro Porteño
5	DF	Limpia Fretes	24 June 2000 (aged 16)	(Paraguayan Football Association) Club Cerro Porteño
6	MF	Cinthia Arévalo	16 May 2001 (aged 15)	(Paraguayan Football Association) Club Atlético Ciudad Nueva
7	MF	Fabiola Sandoval	27 May 1999 (aged 17)	(Paraguayan Football Association) Club Sportivo Luqueno
8	MF	Rosa Miño	13 July 1999 (aged 17)	(Paraguayan Football Association) Club Cerro Porteño
9	FW	María Segovia	7 July 2000 (aged 16)	(Paraguayan Football Association) Club Cerro Porteño
10	FW	Jessica Martínez	14 June 1999 (aged 17)	(Paraguayan Football Association) Club Olimpia
11	FW	Dahiana Bogarín	13 November 2000 (aged 15)	(Paraguayan Football Association) Club Cerro Porteño
12	GK	Andrea Benkenstein	12 September 2000 (aged 16)	(Paraguayan Football Association) Unión de Caronay
13	MF	Deisy Ojeda	3 March 2000 (aged 16)	(Paraguayan Football Association) Club Olimpia
14	DF	Yessica Cabañas	16 April 1999 (aged 17)	(Paraguayan Football Association) Club Sportivo Limpeno
15	MF	Camila González	9 April 1999 (aged 17)	(Paraguayan Football Association) Universidad Autonoma de Asuncion
16	DF	Vanessa Arce	27 May 2000 (aged 16)	(Paraguayan Football Association) Club Cerro Porteño
17	MF	Graciela Martínez	24 May 2001 (aged 15)	(Paraguayan Football Association) Club Cerro Porteño
18	MF	Natalia Villasanti	10 March 2000 (aged 16)	(Paraguayan Football Association) Universidad Autonoma de Asuncion
19	FW	Lourdes Oliveira	16 July 1999 (aged 17)	(Paraguayan Football Association) Club Atlético Ciudad Nueva
20	MF	Katia Martínez	7 October 1999 (aged 16)	(Paraguayan Football Association) Club Derecho UNA
21	GK	Natasha Martínez	17 July 2000 (aged 16)	(Paraguayan Football Association) Universidad Autonoma de Asuncion

=== Ghana ===
Coach: (Ghana) Evans Adotey

No.	Pos.	Player	Date of birth (age)	Club
1	GK	Kayza Massey	2 February 2001 (aged 15)	(Canadian Soccer Association) Ottawa South United
2	DF	Joyce Asamoah	14 September 2000 (aged 16)	(Ghana Football Association) Fabulous Ladies FC
3	MF	Nina Norshie	14 September 2001 (aged 15)	(Ghana Football Association) Valued Girls FC
4	DF	Uwaisa Mawia	20 February 2000 (aged 16)	(Ghana Football Association) Ampem Darkoa Ladies
5	DF	Linda Amoako	7 February 1999 (aged 17)	(Ghana Football Association) Soccer Intellectual Ladies
6	MF	Grace Asantewaa	5 December 2000 (aged 15)	(Ghana Football Association) Ampem Darkoa Ladies
7	FW	Rafia Kulchirie	20 December 2001 (aged 14)	(Ghana Football Association) Hasaacas Ladies FC
8	MF	Grace Acheampong	6 September 2000 (aged 16)	(Ghana Football Association) Bafana Ladies
9	MF	Gifty Acheampong	5 November 1999 (aged 16)	(Ghana Football Association) Immigration FC
10	FW	Sandra Owusu-Ansah	29 January 2000 (aged 16)	(Ghana Football Association) Supreme Ladies
11	MF	Mary Entoah	27 April 2000 (aged 16)	(Ghana Football Association) Police Ladies
12	DF	Cecilia Hagan	7 February 2000 (aged 16)	(Ghana Football Association) Bafana Ladies
13	MF	Olivia Anokye	1 April 2000 (aged 16)	(Ghana Football Association) Bafana Ladies
14	DF	Philicity Asuako	25 December 1999 (aged 16)	(Ghana Football Association) Samaria Ladies
15	FW	Adizatu Mustapha	4 July 1999 (aged 17)	(Ghana Football Association) Soccer Intellectual Ladies
16	GK	Barikisu Issahaku	12 November 2001 (aged 14)	(Ghana Football Association) Wa Ladies
17	MF	Fuseina Mumuni	2 April 2001 (aged 15)	(Ghana Football Association) Lepo Stars Ladies FC
18	DF	Blessing Agbomadzi	11 June 2001 (aged 15)	(Ghana Football Association) Sport Academy
19	FW	Sylvian Amankwah	20 October 1999 (aged 16)	(Ghana Football Association) Prison Ladies
20	FW	Vivian Adjei	14 January 2000 (aged 16)	(Ghana Football Association) Sport Academy
21	GK	Selina Amusilie	23 May 2001 (aged 15)	(Ghana Football Association) Soccer Intellectual Ladies

=== Japan ===
Coach: Naoki Kusunose

No.	Pos.	Player	Date of birth (age)	Club
1	GK	Momoko Tanaka	17 March 2000 (aged 16)	(Japan Football Association) NTV Menina
2	DF	Nana Ono	1 May 1999 (aged 17)	(Japan Football Association) NTV Menina
3	DF	Reina Wakisaka	2 May 1999 (aged 17)	(Japan Football Association) Cerezo Osaka Sakai Ladies
4	DF	Miyu Takahira	4 November 1999 (aged 16)	(Japan Football Association) JFA Academy Fukushima
5	DF	Riko Ushijima	12 December 1999 (aged 16)	(Japan Football Association) Hinomoto Gakuen HS
6	DF	Rio Kanekatsu	11 March 1999 (aged 17)	(Japan Football Association) Urawa Red Diamonds Ladies
7	MF	Saori Takarada	27 December 1999 (aged 16)	(Japan Football Association) Cerezo Osaka Sakai Ladies
8	MF	Hinata Miyazawa	28 November 1999 (aged 16)	(Japan Football Association) Seiwa Gakuen HS
9	FW	Riko Ueki	30 July 1999 (aged 17)	(Japan Football Association) NTV Menina
10	MF	Fuka Nagano	9 March 1999 (aged 17)	(Japan Football Association) Urawa Red Diamonds Ladies
11	FW	Hana Takahashi	19 February 2000 (aged 16)	(Japan Football Association) Urawa Red Diamonds Ladies
12	GK	Chiaki Kogure	12 March 1999 (aged 17)	(Japan Football Association) Maebashi Ikuei HS
13	MF	Mayu Karahashi	4 August 1999 (aged 17)	(Japan Football Association) Albirex Niigata Ladies
14	FW	Seira Kojima	5 February 2000 (aged 16)	(Japan Football Association) Urawa Red Diamonds Ladies
15	MF	Remina Chiba	30 April 1999 (aged 17)	(Japan Football Association) Fujieda Junshin HS
16	FW	Jun Endo	24 May 2000 (aged 16)	(Japan Football Association) JFA Academy Fukushima
17	MF	Oto Kanno	30 October 2000 (aged 15)	(Japan Football Association) NTV Menina
18	GK	Mayu Mizuguchi	11 February 1999 (aged 17)	(Japan Football Association) Yamato Sylphid
19	DF	Miyu Tomita	5 February 1999 (aged 17)	(Japan Football Association) Okamyama Sakuyo HS
20	MF	Nanami Kitamura	25 November 1999 (aged 16)	(Japan Football Association) Cerezo Osaka Sakai Ladies
21	MF	Sakura Nojima	25 April 1999 (aged 17)	(Japan Football Association) Cerezo Osaka Sakai Ladies
