= 2014 UEFA Women's Under-17 Championship =

European football tournament

Tournament details
- Host country: England
- Dates: 26 November – 8 December 2013
- Teams: 8
- Venue: 4 (in 4 host cities)

Final positions
- Champions: Germany (4th title)
- Runners-up: Spain
- Third place: Italy
- Fourth place: England

Tournament statistics
- Matches played: 16
- Goals scored: 37 (2.31 per match)
- Attendance: 10,239 (640 per match)
- Top scorer(s): (Germany) Jasmin Sehan (Spain) Andrea Falcón (4 goals)
- Best player: (Spain) Andrea Falcón

The 2014 UEFA Women's Under-17 Championship was the seventh edition of the UEFA Women's Under-17 Championship. England hosted the final tournament from 26 November to 8 December 2013, taking it for the first time outside of Nyon, Switzerland. It was the first edition to feature eight finalist teams, and served as the qualifier for the 2014 FIFA U-17 Women's World Cup, to be held in March–April 2014.

Portugal ensured their first presence in the competition's final tournament, after concluding the qualification as the best runner-up. They will join France, Germany and Spain, together with fellow debutants Austria, Italy and Scotland. Poland were the defending champions, having defeating Sweden 1–0 in the previous season's final, but were unable to defend their title after failing qualification for this edition's final tournament.

== Qualification ==
Qualification for the final tournament consisted of two rounds. The first round was held between 2 July and 11 August 2013, and the second round between 20 September and 20 October 2013. As hosts, England qualified automatically for the final tournament, while France, Germany and Spain received a bye to the second round due to their coefficient ranking. Forty teams entered the draw for the first round, held on 20 November 2012, where they were distributed in ten groups of four. Each group was contested as a mini-tournament hosted in the country of one of the group's teams. The group winners, runners-up and the best third-placed team qualified for the second round, where the 24 teams were drawn in six groups of four. The group winners and the best runners-up qualified for the final tournament.

=== Qualified teams ===
The following eight teams qualified for the final tournament:

Team	Qualified as	Qualified on	Previous appearances	Best performance
England	Hosts	20 March 2012	1 (2008)	4th place (2008)
Spain	Group 1 winners	5 October 2013	4 (2009, 2010, 2011, 2013)	Winners (2010, 2011)
Austria	Group 2 winners	13 October 2013	0 (debut)	
Italy	Group 3 winners	20 October 2013	0 (debut)	
France	Group 4 winners	17 October 2013	4 (2008, 2009, 2011, 2012)	Runner-up (2008, 2011, 2012)
Scotland	Group 5 winners	7 October 2013	0 (debut)	
Germany	Group 6 winners	16 October 2013	5 (2008, 2009, 2010, 2011, 2012)	Winners (2008, 2009, 2012)
Portugal	Best runner-up	20 October 2013	0 (debut)	

== Venues ==
Telford	Hinckley
New Bucks Head	De Montfort Park
Capacity: 6,300	Capacity: 4,300
2014 UEFA Women's Under-17 Championship is located in England
Chesterfield	Burton upon Trent
SMH Group Stadium	Pirelli Stadium
Capacity: 10,300	Capacity: 6,900

== Match officials ==
UEFA named six referees and eight assistant referees to officiate matches at the final tournament. Additionally, two referees from the host nation were chosen as fourth officials.

Referees

- Irina Turovskaya (Belarus)
- Vesna Budimir (Croatia)
- Eleni Lampadariou (Finland)
- Ana Minić (Serbia)
- Sara Persson (Sweden)
- Zuzana Štrpková (Slovakia)

Assistant referees

- Ekatinera Marinova (Bulgaria)
- Mathilde Abildgaard (Denmark)
- Katalin Török (Hungary)
- Yelena Alistratova (Kazakhstan)
- Anna Dąbrowska (Poland)
- Susanne Küng (Switzerland)
- Yana Saschyna (Ukraine)

Fourth officials

- Virginie Derouaux (Belgium)
- Tania Fernandes Morais (Luxembourg)

== Group stage ==
2014 UEFA Women's Under-17 Championship teams and final tournament performance

The draw was held on 24 October 2013 at Burton-upon-Trent.

The top two teams of each group advance to the semi-finals.

Tie-breaking

If two or more teams were equal on points on completion of the group matches, the following tie-breaking criteria were applied:

1. Higher number of points obtained in the matches played between the teams in question;
2. Superior goal difference resulting from the matches played between the teams in question;
3. Higher number of goals scored in the matches played between the teams in question;

If, after having applied criteria 1 to 3, teams still have an equal ranking, criteria 1 to 3 are reapplied exclusively to the matches between the teams in question to determine their final rankings. If this procedure does not lead to a decision, criteria 4 to 7 apply.

4. Superior goal difference in all group matches;
5. Higher number of goals scored in all group matches;
6. Respect Fair play ranking of the teams in question (final tournament);
7. Drawing of lots.

If only two teams are tied (according to criteria 1–7) after having met in the last match of the group stage, their ranking is determined by a penalty shoot-out.

Key to colours in group tables
Group winners and runners-up advanced to the semi-finals

All times are in Greenwich Mean Time (UTC±00:00).

=== Group A ===
Team	Pld	W	D	L	GF	GA	GD	Pts
Italy	3	2	0	1	3	1	+2	6
England	3	2	0	1	8	3	+5	6
Austria	3	1	1	1	2	2	0	4
Portugal	3	0	1	2	1	8	−7	1

26 November 2013
13:30

England	0–1	Italy
	Report	Cavicchia 74'

New Bucks Head, Telford
Attendance: 2,185
Referee: Sara Persson (Sweden)
26 November 2013
20:00

Austria	0–0	Portugal
	Report

New Bucks Head, Telford
Attendance: 404
Referee: Irina Turovskaya (Belarus)

29 November 2013
13:30

Italy	2–0	Portugal
Giugliano 7'; Marinelli 76'	Report

De Montfort Park, Hinckley
Attendance: 381
Referee: Ana Jovanović (Serbia)
29 November 2013
20:00

England	2–1	Austria
Plumptre 27'; Porter 59'	Report	Wasserbauer 15'

Proact Stadium, Chesterfield
Attendance: 2,011
Referee: Lina Lehtovaara (Finland)

2 December 2013
13:30

Portugal	1–6	England
Leandra Pereira 40'	Report	Rouse 10'; Clarke 33'; Primus 35'; Kelly 52'; Hassall 57' (pen.); Porter 65'

Pirelli Stadium, Burton upon Trent
Attendance: 1,991
Referee: Ana Jovanović (Serbia)
2 December 2013
13:30

Italy	0–1	Austria
	Report	Dunst 36'

New Bucks Head, Telford
Attendance: 416
Referee: Vesna Budimir (Croatia)

=== Group B ===
Team	Pld	W	D	L	GF	GA	GD	Pts
Spain	3	2	1	0	6	0	+6	7
Germany	3	2	0	1	8	6	+2	6
France	3	1	0	2	1	6	−5	3
Scotland	3	0	1	2	2	5	−3	1

26 November 2013
13:30

Germany	4–2	Scotland
Meier 9'; Sehan 12', 35', 77'	Report	Howat 60'; Walker 68'

De Montfort Park, Hinckley
Attendance: 368
Referee: Zuzana Štrpková (Slovakia)
26 November 2013
20:00

France	0–2	Spain
	Report	García Boa 31'; Guijarro 53'

De Montfort Park, Hinckley
Attendance: 619
Referee: Lina Lehtovaara (Finland)

29 November 2013
13:30

Germany	4–0	France
Sehan 4'; Ehegötz 26'; Walkling 42'; Specht 71'	Report

New Bucks Head, Telford
Attendance: 367
Referee: Vesna Budimir (Croatia)
29 November 2013
20:00

Scotland	0–0	Spain
	Report

Pirelli Stadium, Burton upon Trent
Attendance: 313
Referee: Irina Turovskaya (Belarus)

2 December 2013
13:30

Spain	4–0	Germany
Falcón 13', 60'; Bonmati 71', 74'	Report

De Montfort Park, Hinckley
Attendance: 343
Referee: Zuzana Štrpková (Slovakia)
2 December 2013
13:30

Scotland	0–1	France
	Report	Marichaud 62'

Proact Stadium, Chesterfield
Attendance: 461
Referee: Sara Persson (Sweden)

== Knockout stage ==
In the knockout stage, penalty shoot-out is used to decide the winner if necessary (no extra time is played).

=== Bracket ===
Semi-finals
5 December 2013 – Chesterfield
Italy	0
Germany	1
5 December 2013 – Burton upon Trent
Spain	3
England	0

Final
8 December 2013 – Chesterfield
Germany	1 (3)
Spain	1 (1)
Third place
8 December 2013 – Burton upon Trent
Italy	0 (4)
England	0 (3)

=== Semifinals ===
5 December 2013
18:30

Italy	0–1	Germany
	Report	Walkling 15'

Proact Stadium, Chesterfield
Attendance: 380
Referee: Ana Minić (Serbia)

5 December 2013
20:00

Spain	3–0	England
Falcón 16', 79'; P. Garrote 55'	Report

Pirelli Stadium, Burton upon Trent
Referee: Vesna Budimir (Croatia)

=== Third place match ===
8 December 2013
13:00

Italy	0–0	England
	Report
Penalties
Boattin (penalty scored); Giugliano (penalty scored); Marinelli (penalty scored); Durante (penalty missed); Vergani (penalty scored)	4–3	Hassall (penalty missed); Williamson (penalty scored); Kelly (penalty missed); McHugh (penalty scored); Walsh (penalty scored)

Pirelli Stadium, Burton upon Trent
Referee: Zuzana Štrpková (Slovakia)

=== Final ===
8 December 2013
18:00

Germany	1–1	Spain
Hartig 76'	Report	Guijarro 9'
Penalties
Meier (penalty missed); Sehan (penalty scored); Widak (penalty scored); Hartig (penalty scored)	3–1	Guijarro (penalty scored); García Boa (penalty missed); García (penalty missed); P. Garrote (penalty missed)

Proact Stadium, Chesterfield
Referee: Sara Persson (Sweden)

2014 UEFA Women's Under-17 European champions

Germany
4th title

== Goalscorers ==
4 goals

- (Germany) Jasmin Sehan
- (Spain) Andrea Falcón

2 goals

- (England) Lucy Porter
- (Germany) Ricarda Walkling
- (Spain) Aitana Bonmati
- (Spain) Patricia Guijarro

1 goal

- (Austria) Barbara Dunst
- (Austria) Nina Wasserbauer
- (England) Evie Clarke
- (England) Alice Hassall
- (England) Chloe Kelly
- (England) Ashleigh Plumptre
- (England) Atlanta Primus
- (England) Mollie Rouse
- (France) Julie Marichaud
- (Germany) Nina Ehegötz
- (Germany) Saskia Meier
- (Germany) Michaela Specht
- (Italy) Federica Cavicchia
- (Italy) Manuela Giugliano
- (Italy) Gloria Marinelli
- (Portugal) Leandra Pereira
- (Scotland) Kirsty Howat
- (Scotland) Alyshia Walker
- (Spain) Mireya García Boa
- (Spain) Pilar Garrote

== Team of the tournament ==
Goalkeepers

- (Spain) Elena De Toro
- (Austria) Carolin Grössinger
- (Scotland) Laura Hamilton

Defenders

- (Spain) Beatriz Beltrán
- (Italy) Lisa Boattin
- (England) Gabrielle George
- (Spain) Queralt Gómez
- (Italy) Nicole Peressotti
- (Italy) Marta Vergani
- (England) Leah Williamson

Midfielders

- (Spain) Aitana Bonmatí
- (Scotland) Erin Cuthbert
- (Germany) Kim Fellhauer
- (Portugal) Mariana Fong
- (Spain) Pilar Garrote
- (Spain) Patricia Guijarro
- (France) Clara Mateo
- (England) Keira Walsh

Forwards

- (Spain) Nahikari García
- (Spain) Mireya García Boa
- (Spain) Andrea Falcón
- (Germany) Jasmin Sehan
- (Scotland) Alyshia Walker

Source: UEFA Technical Report

Golden player: (Spain) Falcón
