= Grossinger =

Grossinger also as Größinger, Grössinger is a surname. Notable persons with the surname include:

- Carolin Größinger (born 1997), Austrian footballer
- Christa Grössinger (1942–2008), German art historian
- Fred Grossinger (1936–1995), American actor
- Harvey Grossinger, American writer
- Jennie Grossinger (1892–1972), American hotelier
- Johann Baptist Grossinger (1728–1803), Jesuit priest and naturalist
- Markus Grössinger (born 1989), Austrian footballer
- Richard Grossinger (born 1944), American writer
