= Fellhauer =

Fellhauer is a surname. Notable people with the surname include:

- David Eugene Fellhauer (1939–2026), American Roman Catholic bishop
- Kim Fellhauer (born 1998), German footballer
- Robin Fellhauer (born 1998), German footballer
