= Carolin Größinger =

Austrian footballer (born 1997)

Carolin Grössinger
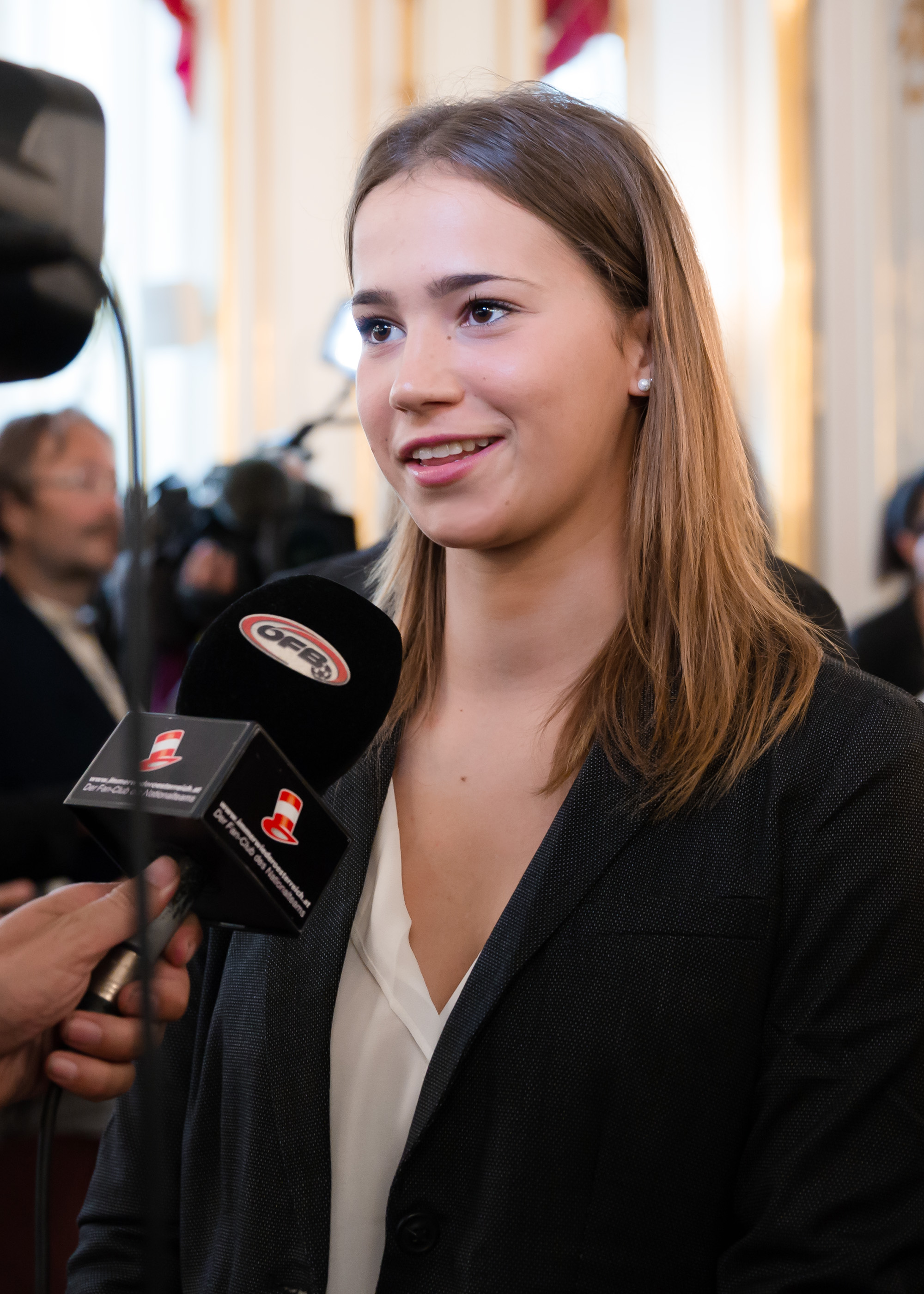
- Grössinger at a reception for the Austria women's national football team

Personal information
- Date of birth: 10 May 1997 (age 29)
- Place of birth: Salzburg, Austria
- Height: 1.74 m (5 ft 9 in)
- Position: Goalkeeper

Team information
- Current team: FC Bergheim
- Number: 21

Senior career*
Years	Team	Apps	(Gls)
2012–2013	SG FC Bergheim/USK Hof	11	(0)
2014	SKN St. Pölten	0	(0)
2014–2016	Union Kleinmünchen	28	(0)
2016	Bayer 04 Leverkusen	0	(0)
2017–	FC Bergheim	7	(0)

International career
2013–2014	Austria U17s	9	(0)
2015–2016	Austria U19s	9	(0)
- * Club domestic league appearances and goals

Carolin Grössinger (born 10 May 1997) is an Austrian footballer who plays as a goalkeeper for FC Bergheim in the ÖFB-Frauenliga.

== Career ==
=== Club ===
Grössinger started her professional career in the summer of 2012 at the SG Bergheim/Hof in the ÖFB-Frauenliga. In the winter of 2014, Grössinger moved to SKN St. Pölten, but she didn't play any matches for the team. In the summer of 2014, she signed with Union Kleinmünchen where she spent the next two seasons and recorded a total of 28 appearances with the team. For the 2016/17 season, Größinger signed a contract with the German Bundesliga side Bayer 04 Leverkusen. In January 2017, Größinger announced her immediate return to Austria. On 17 March 2017, Größinger signed with FC Bergheim.

=== International ===
Grössinger has been through the junior teams of the ÖFB since the U-16. With the U-17 national team, she qualified in 2014 for the European Championship in England. After the tournament, in which Austria was eliminated in the group stage, Grössinger was selected as one of three goalkeepers in the team of the tournament. Two years later she succeeded with the U-19 national team, also qualifying for the European Championship in Slovakia. On 1 July 2017, Grössinger was included in the 23-women squad who represented Austria in the UEFA Women's Euro 2017. The team reached the semi-finals, but she didn't play any match.

== Personal life ==
Grössinger is the sister of the former professional footballer Markus Grössinger, her cousin Isabella Grössinger was also an Austrian international player.
