= Luizão (footballer, born 1968) =

Brazilian footballer and manager

Personal information
- Full name: Luiz Antonio Ribeiro
- Date of birth: 22 October 1968 (age 58)
- Place of birth: São Paulo
- Height: 1.89 m (6 ft 2 in)
- Position: Midfielder

Team information
- Current team: Juventus U-20 (manager)
- Number: 8

Youth career
- 1988-1992: Juventus

Senior career*
Years	Team	Apps	(Gls)
1992-1995	Juventus		
1995	Portuguesa		
1996-1998	Cruzeiro		
1999	Vila Nova		
2000	São Caetano		

Managerial career
- 2004-2015: Juventus (youth squads)
- 2015-2019: Brazil Women's U-17
- 2019: Juventus U-20
- * Club domestic league appearances and goals

Luiz Antonio Ribeiro, better known as Luizão (born 22 October 1968 in Sâo Paulo), is a football manager and a former Brazilian footballer who used to play as a midfielder.

== Career ==
During the 1990s he played for several traditional Brazilian clubs such as C.A Juventus, Cruzeiro, Portuguesa, A.D. São Caetano, Comercial-RP and Vila Nova.

After finishing his career as a football player, he started a career as a football coach. From 2015 until 2019 he was the Brazil women's national under-17 football team coach in the 2016 FIFA U-17 Women's World Cup and 2018 FIFA U-17 Women's World Cup.

In 2020 he became the Juventus u-20 coach.
