= Rubí Villegas =

Mexican footballer (born 1997)

Personal information
- Full name: Rubí Iridian Villegas Aguilar
- Date of birth: 28 August 1997 (age 29)
- Place of birth: Puebla City, Puebla, Mexico
- Height: 1.60 m (5 ft 3 in)
- Position: Defensive midfielder

Senior career*
Years	Team	Apps	(Gls)
2022	Juárez	22	(1)
2023	FC Samegrelo Chkhorotsku		
2024–2026	Puebla	56	(4)

International career^{‡}
2013–2014	Mexico U17		
- * Club domestic league appearances and goals as of 4 June 2023 ‡ National team caps and goals as of 12 March 2022

Rubí Iridian Villegas Aguilar (born 28 August 1997) is a Mexican professional footballer who plays as a Defensive midfielder.

Villegas was part of the Mexico women's national under-17 team who reached the quarter finals of the 2014 FIFA U-17 Women's World Cup.

In 2022, Villegas started her career in Juárez. She joined to Puebla in 2024.
