= Ricarda Walkling =

German footballer (born 1997)

Personal information
- Date of birth: 19 March 1997 (age 29)
- Place of birth: Hannover, Germany
- Height: 1.67 m (5 ft 6 in)
- Position: Midfielder

Team information
- Current team: Borussia Dortmund
- Number: 6

Youth career
- 2002–2008: SV Obergriesbach
- 2008–2010: TSV Schwaben Augsburg
- 2010–2014: Bayern Munich

College career
Years	Team	Apps	(Gls)
2016–2019	NC State Wolfpack	86	(11)

Senior career*
Years	Team	Apps	(Gls)
2013–2016	Bayern Munich II	31	(7)
2013–2016	Bayern Munich	9	(1)
2020–2026	Werder Bremen	116	(3)
2026–	Borussia Dortmund	13	(1)

International career^{‡}
2012–2013	Germany U-16	6	(0)
2013–2014	Germany U-17	15	(6)
2015–2016	Germany U-19	5	(4)
- * Club domestic league appearances and goals as of 20 November 2026 ‡ National team caps and goals as of 7 April 2016

Ricarda Walkling (born 19 March 1997) is a German footballer who plays as a midfielder for Frauen-Regionalliga club Borussia Dortmund.

== Early life ==
Walkling was born in Hanover and grew up in Obergriesbach, Bavaria.

== Club career ==
Walkling started her career in 2002 with SV Obergriesbach and spent two years at TSV Schwaben Augsburg from 2008 to 2010 before moving to the youth ranks of FC Bayern Munich in 2010. With Bayern Munich junior, she won the 2013 German Championship, scoring the equalizer in the final against FSV Gütersloh 2009, a game that ended 3–1 in favour of Bayern Munich. She made her first team debut in the second round of the DFB-Pokal on 29 September 2013. Soon after, on 6 October 2013 she made her Bundesliga debut against BV Cloppenburg as an 89th-minute substitute for Vanessa Bürki and a few moments later netted her first team debut goal to confirm the 5–2 victory. In the 2013–14 season, beside her appearances for the first team she also played for the junior team, who won their second consecutive title on 31 May 2014 after a 1–0 victory in the final over Turbine Potsdam.

In 2016, Walkling left Germany to go to the United States. She joined the North Carolina team NC State Wolfpack. In 2020, she would return again to Germany, this time joining Werder Bremen.

In the summer of 2026, she will move to Regionalliga club Borussia Dortmund.

== International career ==
Walkling debuted for the national U-16 team on 11 September 2012 in Hamburg in a 3–1 victory against Norway. She won the Nordic Cup in July 2013 in Iceland with the U-16 team after four wins. On 30 January 2013, she debuted for the national U-17 team in Carson City against United States in an exhibition game that ended 1–1. On 11 October 2013, she scored a hattrick against Switzerland in a European Championship qualifier 6–0 victory. She was part of the U-17 squad to play at the 2014 UEFA Women's Under-17 Championship in England, winning all the matches (including a 3–1 win in the penalty shoot-out against Spain in the final). At this tournament she also grabbed two goals in the 4–0 victory at the group stage against France as well as the 1–0 winning goal in the semifinals against Italy.

== Honours ==
Bayern Munich

- Bundesliga: 2014–15, 2015–16

Germany U17

- UEFA Women's Under-17 Championship: 2014
