= Johann Baptist Grossinger =

Jesuit priest and naturalist (1728–1803)

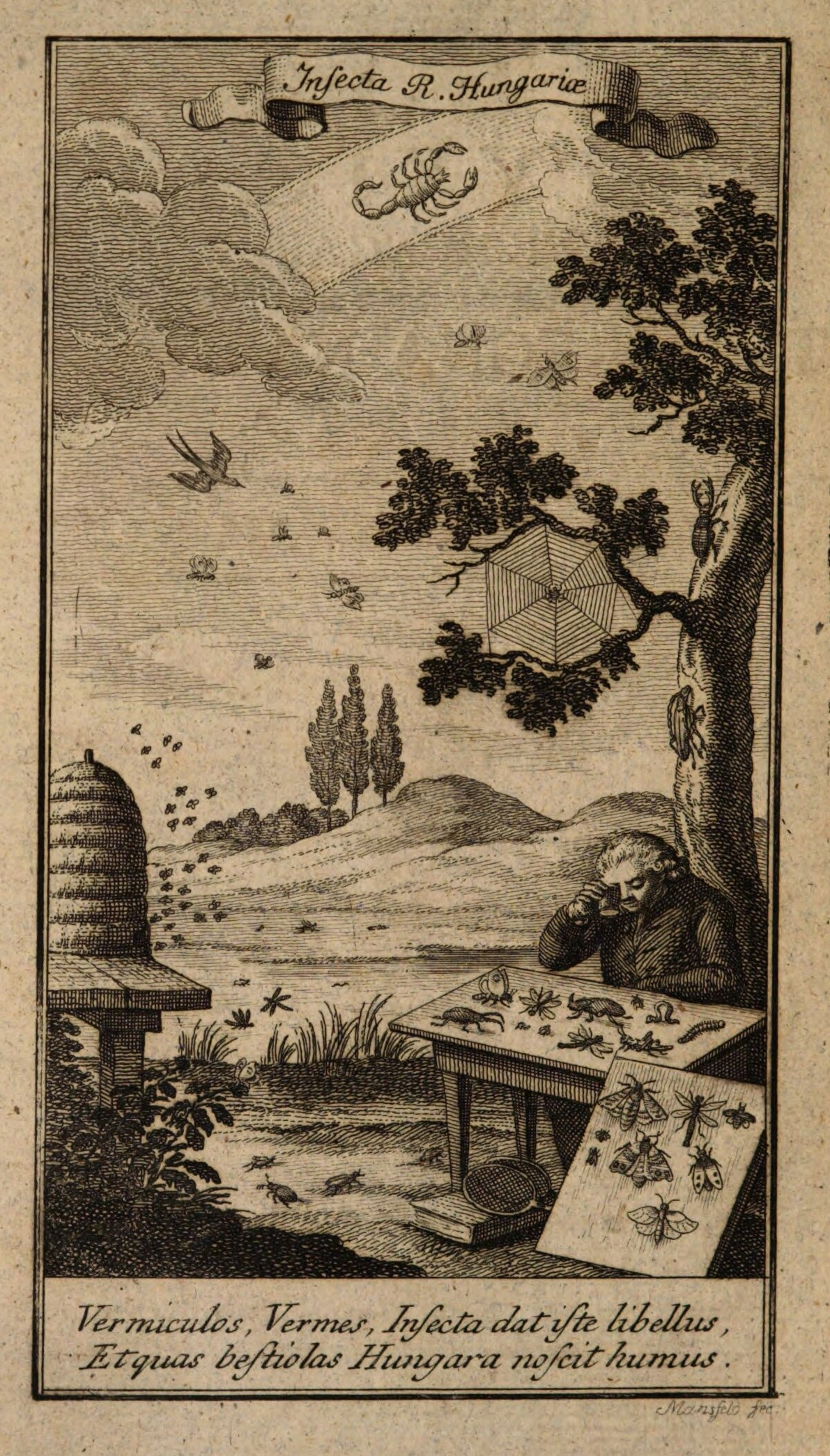
Frontispiece from volume 4 dealing with the insects of Hungary

Johann Baptist Grossinger or János Keresztély Grossinger (in Hungarian form) (27 September 1728 – 2 January 1803) was an Austro-Hungarian Jesuit priest and naturalist. He served as a professor of language, philosophy and theology at Jesuit schools in Trnava, Košice, Trenčín, Győri, Vienna, Skalica, and Bratislava. He wrote several encyclopedic works on natural history in the region.

Grossinger was born in Komárno and went to school in Raab before he joined the Society of Jesus at the age of 17. He studied philosophy at Graz and then theology at Nagyszombat (Tyrnau). He took his vows in 1762 and then became a teacher and chaplain serving in a number of places. He was prefect of the seminary in Nagyszombat and then a teacher of linguistics. He taught in Trenčín from 1767. In 1769-70 he was at Košice. From 1771 to 1773, following the dissolution of the Jesuit Order, he was a chaplain for the Haller regiment in Italy. From 1780 he was pastor at his hometown where he died in 1803. During his spare time he studied natural history and collected specimens many of which were held in the Košice Museum. In 1783 he wrote Dissertatio de terrae motibus regni Hungariae and from 1793 to 1797 he wrote a five volume Universa historia physica regni Hungariae, secundum tria naturae regna digesta which covered the birds, fish, insects and plants of Hungary. He also dealt with microscopic organisms suggesting that vinegar was formed by worms. The fifth book covered trees while the fourth dealt with insects. He described the life history of insects.
