= Camila González =

Paraguayan footballer (born 1999)

Personal information
- Full name: Jennifer Camila González Quintana
- Date of birth: 9 April 1999 (age 27)
- Height: 1.74 m (5 ft 9 in)
- Position: Midfielder

Team information
- Current team: Deportivo Capiatá

Senior career*
Years	Team	Apps	(Gls)
- Universidad Autónoma
- Deportivo Capiatá

International career^{‡}
2016–2018	Paraguay U17	2	(0)
2018	Paraguay U20	2	(0)
2019–	Paraguay	1	(0)
- * Club domestic league appearances and goals ‡ National team caps and goals as of 4 October 2019

Jennifer Camila González Quintana (born 9 April 1999), known as Camila González, is a Paraguayan footballer who plays as a midfielder for Deportivo Capiatá and the Paraguay women's national team.

== Club career ==
González is former player of Universidad Autónoma.

== International career ==
González represented Paraguay at two FIFA U-17 Women's World Cup editions (2014 and 2016) and the 2018 FIFA U-20 Women's World Cup. She made her senior debut on 4 October 2019 in a 1–1 friendly draw against Venezuela.
