= Christa Grössinger =

German art historian

Christa Grössinger (8 May 1942 – 14 March 2008) was a German academic specialising in late medieval and early Renaissance art in northern Europe. She was a Fellow of the Society of Antiquaries of London. Grössinger was an expert on misericords and medieval church furniture. Her work included the role of women in medieval and Renaissance art and on women and women's writings from antiquity to the late Middle Ages. She joined the University of Manchester in 1972 where she became a Senior Lecturer.

== Biography ==
Grössinger was born on 8 May 1942 in Höhr-Grenzhausen, Westerwald, western Germany. At age 12, she moved to Northern Ireland with her family.

Grössinger earned a BA in German from Queen’s University Belfast in 1963. She went to the University of Vienna in 1964 for her PhD where she studied under Otto Pächt and Otto Demus. This included a year of research at the Courtauld Institute of Art in London on an Austria Council Scholarship. In 1972, she submitted her thesis, which traced the stylistic development of 13th- and 14th-century misericords: she was known as an expert on misericords throughout her life. She joined the University of Manchester in 1972 lecturing in Art History, becoming Senior Lecturer at the School of Arts Histories and Cultures Lecturer in 1998. She was elected a Fellow of the Society of Antiquaries of London in 2004.

In 2006, she saw a Bristol Cathedral misericord for sale by the London antiques dealer Sam Fogg. The misericord had originally belonged to Bristol Cathedral, but had been removed "because of its bawdy humour". She successfully lobbied for the Bristol Museum and Art Gallery to arrange the funds for its purchase.

In 2006, she was part of a team of experts studying the misericords of Ripon Cathedral, North Yorkshire, for a project organised by York Archaeological Trust. The misericords were presumed to have inspired characters in Lewis Carroll's Alice's Adventures In Wonderland.

Grössinger died in Manchester on 18 March 2009.

== Selected works ==
- Ripon Cathedral Misericords: 500 Years Anniversary. Ripon: The Dean & Chapter, 1989.
- North-European Panel Paintings. A Catalogue of Netherlandish and German Paintings before 1600 in English Churches and Colleges. London: Harvey Miller, 1992. ISBN 0905203143
- The World Upside Down: English Misericords. London: Harvey Miller, 1996. ISBN 1872501648
- Picturing Women in Late Medieval and Renaissance Art. Manchester: Manchester University Press, 1997. ISBN 0719041104
- Humour and Folly in Secular and Profane Prints of Northern Europe, 1430–1540. London : Harvey Miller, 2002. ISBN 1872501095
