= Markus Grössinger =

Austrian footballer

Personal information
- Date of birth: 1 August 1989 (age 37)
- Place of birth: Austria
- Height: 1.75 m (5 ft 9 in)
- Position: Right winger

Senior career*
| Years | Team | Apps | (Gls) |
| 2009–2010 | SV Grödig | 3 | (0) |
| 2010–2012 | Union Vöcklamarkt | 40 | (6) |
| 2012–2013 | SV Ried | 20 | (2) |
- * Club domestic league appearances and goals as of 26 May 2013

Markus Grössinger (born 1 August 1989) is an Austrian footballer who played in the Bundesliga for SV Ried.
