= Miriam Aguirre =

Mexican football goalkeeper (born 1999)

Personal information
- Full name: Miriam Guadalupe Aguirre Olmos
- Date of birth: 29 January 1999 (age 27)
- Place of birth: Ecatepec, State of Mexico, Mexico
- Height: 1.66 m (5 ft 5 in)
- Position: Goalkeeper

Senior career*
Years	Team	Apps	(Gls)
2017–2018	Pachuca	17	(0)
2019–2023	UNAM	13	(0)
2023–2025	Toluca	10	(0)
2025	Atlético San Luis	0	(0)

International career
2015–2016	Mexico U17		
2016–2018	Mexico U20		
- * Club domestic league appearances and goals as of 18 October 2017

Miriam Guadalupe Aguirre Olmos (born 29 January 1999) is a Mexican professional football goalkeeper who currently is free agent.

== Honors and awards ==
Mexico U17

- CONCACAF Women's U-17 Championship: 2013

Mexico U20

- CONCACAF Women's U-20 Championship: 2018
