= COD United F.C. =

Nigerian football club

C.O.D United Football Club of Lagos
- Full name: C.O.D United Football Club of Lagos
- Nickname(s): The White Lions
- Founded: 2007
- Ground: Onikan Stadium, Lagos
- Capacity: 20, 000
- Chief Executive: Shola Opaleye
- Manager: Okey Emordi
- League: Nigerian National League
- 2016: ----
- Website: http://www.codunitedfc.com
Home colours	Away colours

City of David United Football Club, popularly known as COD United is a Nigerian professional football club based in Lagos State, Nigeria. They play in the Nigeria National League, the second highest level of professional football in Nigeria. The club was established in 2007 by City of David parish of Redeemed Christian Church of God, and plays its home games at Onikan Stadium.

In May 2013, the team won the Lagos State FA Cup, by defeating MFM FC and represented the state at National level. It also have partnership agreements with Bolton Wanderers and Bournemouth of England.

COD United F.C runs 7 football teams, including U-10, U-12, U-14, U-16 and U-21 teams. Each of these teams are managed by a head coach, while a technical director oversees the entire COD United soccer structure.

== History ==
C.O.D United FC was formed by City of David parish of Redeemed Christian Church of God in September 2007. They began competing in the Amateur Division III and soon gained promotion to play in Amateur Division II in 2009. By 2011, COD United played in Amateur Division I, this was followed by her debut in the Nigerian National Division 1 in 2012. The club on its first major trophy in 2013 by winning the Lagos State FA Cup, defeating MFM FC of Lagos. The club in March 2016 appointed renowned coach, Festus Allen as manager of the senior team.

== Technical crew ==
Position	Name
Director of Football	(Nigeria) -----
Team manager	(Nigeria) Okey Emordi
Assistant First Team Manager	(Nigeria) Kazeem Alabi
U-21 Coach	(Nigeria) Kazeem Alabi
U-16 Coach	(Nigeria) Charles Gbenro
U-14 Coach	(Nigeria) Casmir Nwogu
U-12 Coach	(Nigeria) Sunday Ilevbare
Goalkeeping coach	(Nigeria) Olayinka Tunde
Assistant Technical Director	(Nigeria) Victor Akinmoyo
Head, Non Technical Football	(Nigeria) Ayodeji Adegbenro

== Honours ==
- 2013 Lagos State F.A Cup winners
