= Michaela Specht =

German footballer (born 1997)

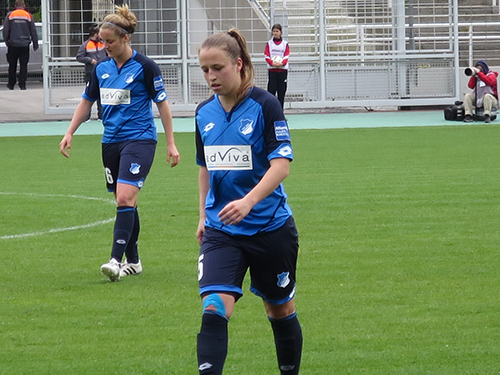

Personal information
- Full name: Michaela Sigrid Specht
- Date of birth: 15 February 1997 (age 29)
- Place of birth: Eschenbach in der Oberpfalz, Germany
- Height: 1.68 m (5 ft 6 in)
- Position: Midfielder

Team information
- Current team: Eintracht Frankfurt II
- Number: 6

Senior career*
Years	Team	Apps	(Gls)
2013–2015	Bayern Munich II	26	(0)
2015–2022	TSG Hoffenheim	98	(0)
2015–2018	→ TSG Hoffenheim II	22	(2)
2022–2023	Real Sociedad	5	(0)
2023–2024	TSG Hoffenheim	16	(1)

International career^{‡}
2013–2014	Germany U17	7	(1)
2015–2016	Germany U19	6	(0)
- * Club domestic league appearances and goals as of 20 May 2024 ‡ National team caps and goals as of 13 July 2023

Michaela Sigrid Specht (born 15 February 1997) is a German footballer who played as a midfielder for TSG Hoffenheim.

== Club career ==
=== Bayern Munich ===
In July 2013, Specht joined Bayern Munich, with view of her playing for their under-17 team.

=== TSG Hoffenheim ===
In April 2014, after winning the German junior championship with Bayern Munich, Specht joined TSG Hoffenheim on a three-year contract.

=== Real Sociedad ===
In July 2022, after seven seasons with TSG Hoffenheim, Specht joined Spanish club Real Sociedad on a two-year contract.

=== Return to TSG Hoffenheim ===
In January 2023, after only six months in Spain, Specht returned to Germany, re-joining TSG Hoffenheim on a contract until 2024.
