= Jasmin Sehan =

German footballer (born 1997)

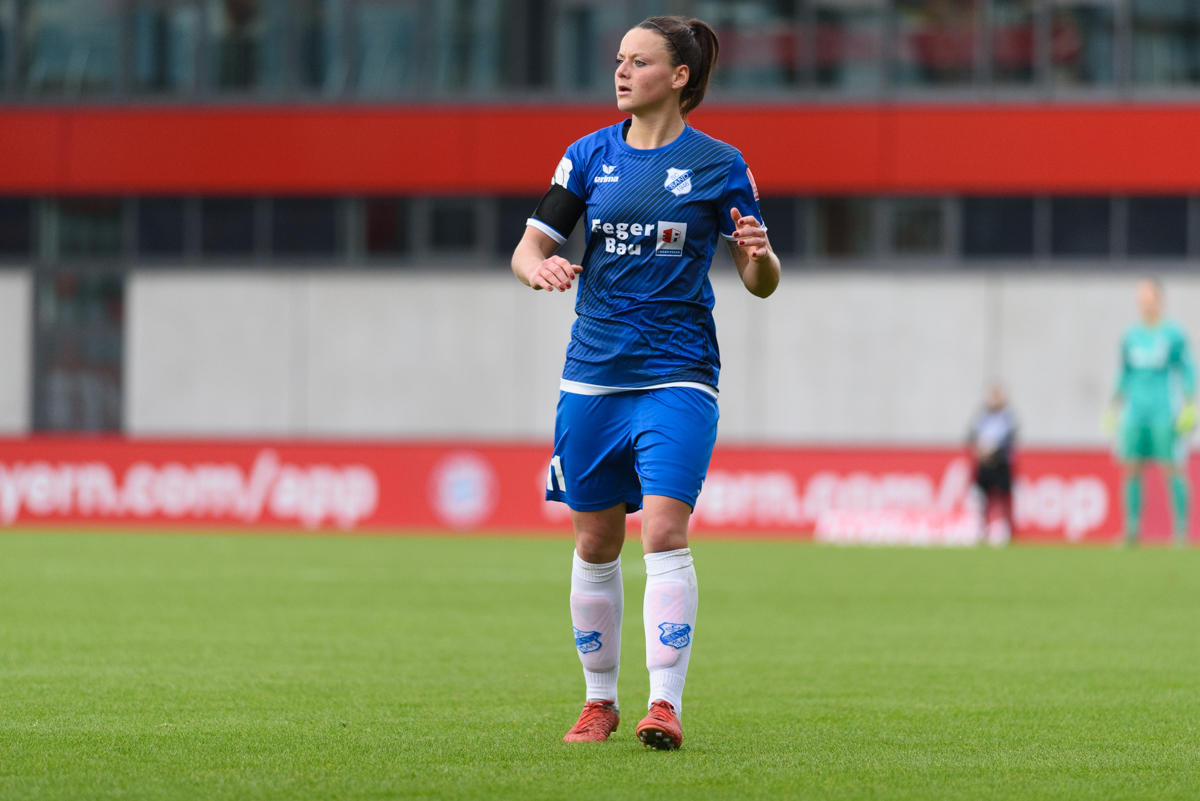
- Sehen with SC Sand

Personal information
- Date of birth: 16 June 1997 (age 29)
- Place of birth: Parchim, Germany
- Height: 1.65 m (5 ft 5 in)
- Position: Attacking midfielder

Youth career
- 1. FC Neubrandenburg 04
- 2014–2014: VfL Wolfsburg

Senior career*
Years	Team	Apps	(Gls)
2013–2018	VfL Wolfsburg II	65	(27)
2018–2020	SC Sand	26	(1)
2020–2024	Werder Bremen	58	(3)
Total		149	(31)

International career
2010–2012	Germany U15	8	(8)
2012–2013	Germany U16	5	(3)
2013–2014	Germany U17	19	(17)
2014–2016	Germany U19	8	(0)
2015–2016	Germany U20	8	(0)
- * Club domestic league appearances and goals

Jasmin Sehan (born 16 June 1997) is a German former footballer who played as an attacking midfielder. Sehan announced her retirement from playing due to knee problems in November 2024, at the age of 27.
