= Isabella Hartig =

German association footballer

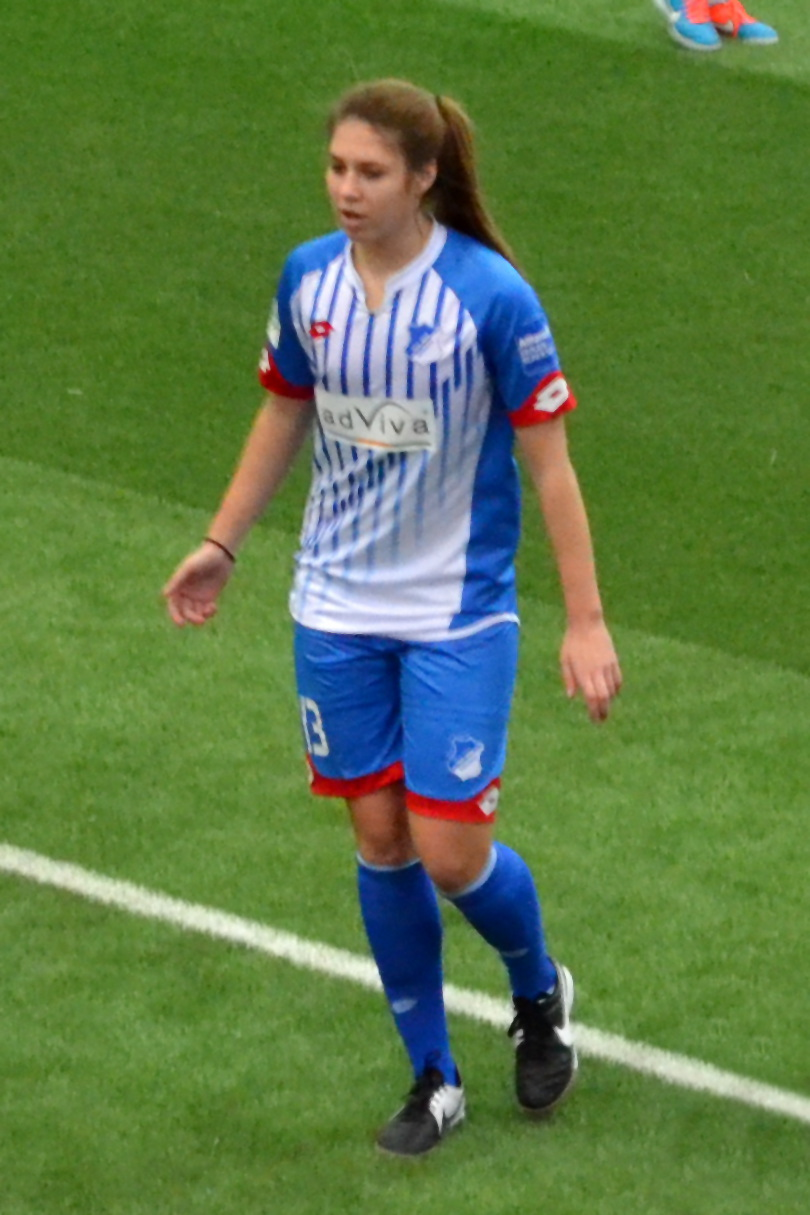

Personal information
- Full name: Isabella Maria Hartig
- Date of birth: 12 August 1997 (age 29)
- Place of birth: Nuremberg, Germany
- Height: 1.69 m (5 ft 7 in)
- Position: Midfielder

Team information
- Current team: TSG Hoffenheim
- Number: 13

Senior career*
Years	Team	Apps	(Gls)
2014–2015	FC Bayern Munich	0	(0)
2015–	TSG Hoffenheim	113	(18)

International career
2013–2014	Germany U17	4	(1)
2014–2016	Germany U19	17	(2)
2015–2016	Germany U20	9	(0)
- * Club domestic league appearances and goals

Isabella Maria Hartig (born 12 August 1997) is a German footballer who plays as a midfielder for TSG Hoffenheim.

== International career ==
Isabella Hartig has represented Germany at youth level.
