= Kim Fellhauer =

German association football player

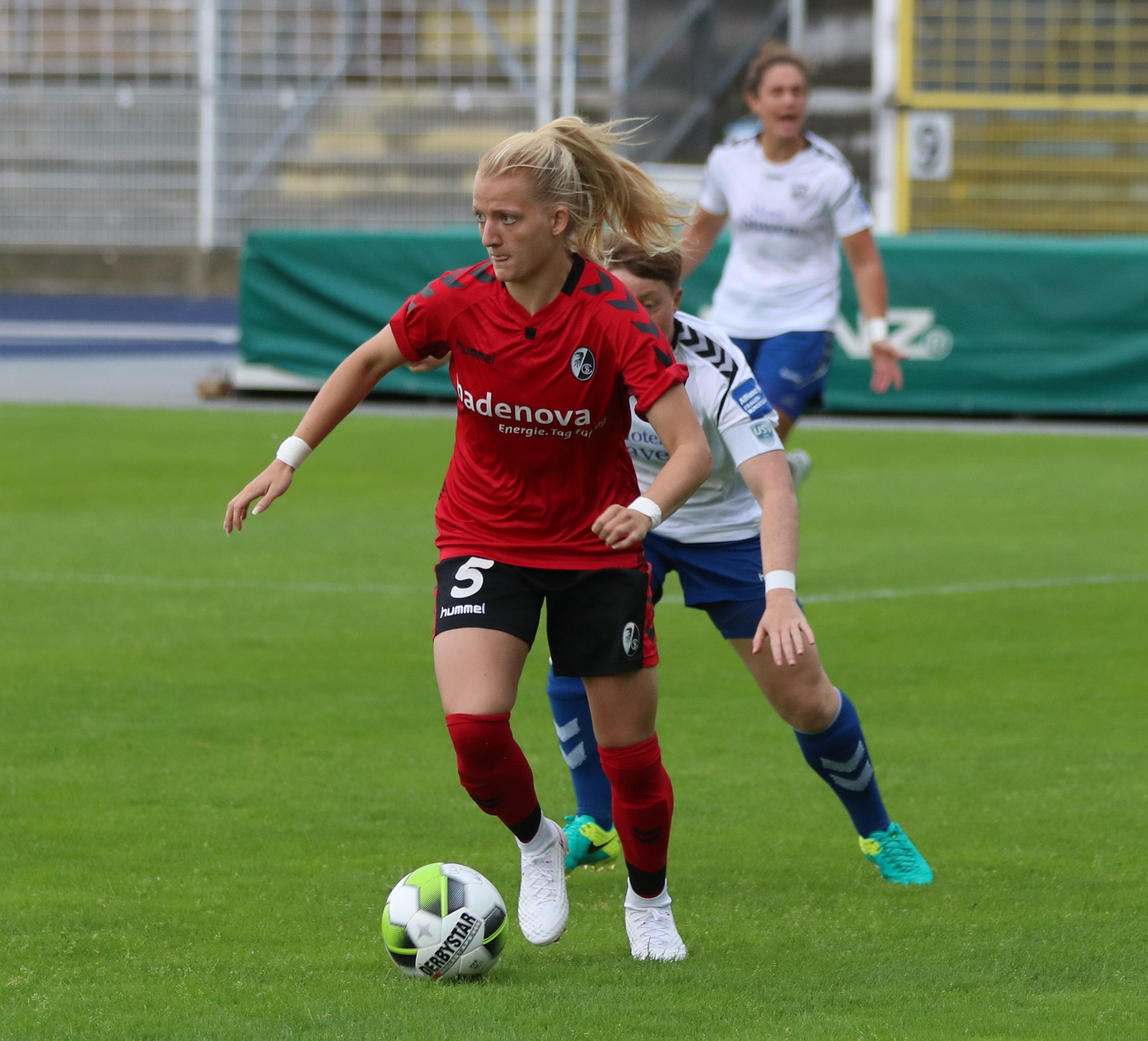

Personal information
- Date of birth: 21 January 1998 (age 28)
- Place of birth: Mannheim, Germany
- Height: 1.70 m (5 ft 7 in)
- Position: Defender

Kim Karen Fellhauer (born 21 January 1998) is a retired German footballer who played for SC Freiburg. She retired from football at 26 due to injury.

== Personal life ==
Kim Fellhauer has a twin brother Robin Fellhauer, who is also a professional football player.

== Honours ==
Germany U17

- UEFA Women's Under-17 Championship: 2016
