= Universidad Autónoma de Asunción (football) =

Paraguayan football club

Universidad Autónoma de Asunción is a Paraguayan women's football club based in Asunción. It is often shortened to UAA.

The team is the record champion of Paraguay having won nine titles up to 2011. After winning the 2009 and 2010 Paraguayan championship, UAA also represented Paraguay in the Copa Libertadores de Fútbol Femenino where it reached the final in 2009, and third place in the group stage in 2010. In 2011 the team finished second in the group stage.

== Achievements ==
- Paraguayan women's football championship
  - Winners (9): 1999, 2003, 2004, 2005, 2006, 2008, 2009, 2010 and 2011
- Copa Libertadores Femenina
  - Runner-up (1): 2009
