= 2017 in Japanese football =

2017 season
- J1, J2, J3: Kawasaki Frontale; Shonan Bellmare; Blaublitz Akita
- J.League Cup: Cerezo Osaka
- Top goalscorer: J1 – Yu Kobayashi (Kawasaki Frontale, 23 goals); J2 – Ibba Laajab (Yokohama FC, 24); J3 – Noriaki Fujimoto (Kagoshima United FC, 24)

Japanese football in 2017.

== Promotion and relegation ==
Teams relegated from J1 League

- Nagoya Grampus
- Shonan Bellmare
- Avispa Fukuoka

Teams promoted to J1 League

- Hokkaido Consadole Sapporo
- Shimizu S-Pulse
- Cerezo Osaka

Teams relegated from J2 League

- Giravanz Kitakyushu

Teams promoted to J2 League

- Oita Trinita

Teams relegated from J3 League

No relegation to the Japan Football League

Teams promoted to J3 League

- Azul Claro Numazu

Teams promoted to Japan Football League

- FC Imabari
- Veertien Mie

== J1 League ==
| Pos | Team | Pld | W | D | L | GF | GA | GD | Pts | Qualification or relegation |
|---|---|---|---|---|---|---|---|---|---|---|
| 1 | Kawasaki Frontale (C) | 34 | 21 | 9 | 4 | 71 | 32 | +39 | 72 | Champions League group stage |
| 2 | Kashima Antlers | 34 | 23 | 3 | 8 | 53 | 31 | +22 | 72 | Champions League group stage |
| 3 | Cerezo Osaka | 34 | 19 | 6 | 9 | 65 | 43 | +22 | 63 | Champions League group stage |
| 4 | Kashiwa Reysol | 34 | 18 | 8 | 8 | 49 | 33 | +16 | 62 | Champions League play-off round (Note: The winner of the 2017 Emperor's Cup qualified for the group stage of the 2018 AFC Champions League. Since the Emperor's Cup winner Cerezo Osaka had already qualified for the AFC Champions League, the play-off round spot was awarded to the fourth-placed team.) |
| 5 | Yokohama F. Marinos | 34 | 17 | 8 | 9 | 45 | 36 | +9 | 59 | |
| 6 | Júbilo Iwata | 34 | 16 | 10 | 8 | 50 | 30 | +20 | 58 | |
| 7 | Urawa Red Diamonds | 34 | 14 | 7 | 13 | 64 | 54 | +10 | 49 | |
| 8 | Sagan Tosu | 34 | 13 | 8 | 13 | 41 | 44 | −3 | 47 | |
| 9 | Vissel Kobe | 34 | 13 | 5 | 16 | 40 | 45 | −5 | 44 | |
| 10 | Gamba Osaka | 34 | 11 | 10 | 13 | 48 | 41 | +7 | 43 | |
| 11 | Consadole Sapporo | 34 | 12 | 7 | 15 | 39 | 47 | −8 | 43 | |
| 12 | Vegalta Sendai | 34 | 11 | 8 | 15 | 44 | 53 | −9 | 41 | |
| 13 | FC Tokyo | 34 | 10 | 10 | 14 | 37 | 42 | −5 | 40 | |
| 14 | Shimizu S-Pulse | 34 | 8 | 10 | 16 | 36 | 54 | −18 | 34 | |
| 15 | Sanfrecce Hiroshima | 34 | 8 | 9 | 17 | 32 | 49 | −17 | 33 | |
| 16 | Ventforet Kofu (R) | 34 | 7 | 11 | 16 | 23 | 39 | −16 | 32 | Relegation to 2018 J2 League |
| 17 | Albirex Niigata (R) | 34 | 7 | 7 | 20 | 28 | 60 | −32 | 28 | Relegation to 2018 J2 League |
| 18 | Omiya Ardija (R) | 34 | 5 | 10 | 19 | 28 | 60 | −32 | 25 | Relegation to 2018 J2 League |

Source: Meiji Yasuda J1 League
Rules for classification: 1) Points; 2) Goal difference; 3) Goals scored
(C) Champions; (R) Relegated

== J2 League ==
| Pos | Team | Pld | W | D | L | GF | GA | GD | Pts | Promotion, qualification or relegation |
|---|---|---|---|---|---|---|---|---|---|---|
| 1 | Shonan Bellmare (C, P) | 42 | 24 | 11 | 7 | 58 | 36 | +22 | 83 | Promotion to 2018 J1 League |
| 2 | V-Varen Nagasaki (P) | 42 | 24 | 8 | 10 | 59 | 41 | +18 | 80 | Promotion to 2018 J1 League |
| 3 | Nagoya Grampus (O, P) | 42 | 23 | 6 | 13 | 85 | 65 | +20 | 75 | Qualification for promotion playoffs (Note: Only teams that meet J1 license criteria can participate in promotion playoffs. If one or more teams fail to meet the criteria, only eligible teams that finished 3rd to 6th will participate and no replacement teams will be added.) |
| 4 | Avispa Fukuoka | 42 | 21 | 11 | 10 | 54 | 36 | +18 | 74 | Qualification for promotion playoffs |
| 5 | Tokyo Verdy | 42 | 20 | 10 | 12 | 64 | 49 | +15 | 70 | Qualification for promotion playoffs |
| 6 | JEF United Chiba | 42 | 20 | 8 | 14 | 70 | 58 | +12 | 68 | Qualification for promotion playoffs |
| 7 | Tokushima Vortis | 42 | 18 | 13 | 11 | 71 | 45 | +26 | 67 | |
| 8 | Matsumoto Yamaga | 42 | 19 | 9 | 14 | 61 | 45 | +16 | 66 | |
| 9 | Oita Trinita | 42 | 17 | 13 | 12 | 58 | 50 | +8 | 64 | |
| 10 | Yokohama FC | 42 | 17 | 12 | 13 | 60 | 49 | +11 | 63 | |
| 11 | Montedio Yamagata | 42 | 14 | 17 | 11 | 45 | 47 | −2 | 59 | |
| 12 | Kyoto Sanga | 42 | 14 | 15 | 13 | 55 | 47 | +8 | 57 | |
| 13 | Fagiano Okayama | 42 | 13 | 16 | 13 | 44 | 49 | −5 | 55 | |
| 14 | Mito HollyHock | 42 | 14 | 12 | 16 | 45 | 48 | −3 | 54 | |
| 15 | Ehime FC | 42 | 14 | 9 | 19 | 54 | 68 | −14 | 51 | |
| 16 | Machida Zelvia | 42 | 11 | 17 | 14 | 53 | 53 | 0 | 50 | |
| 17 | Zweigen Kanazawa | 42 | 13 | 10 | 19 | 49 | 67 | −18 | 49 | |
| 18 | FC Gifu | 42 | 11 | 13 | 18 | 56 | 68 | −12 | 46 | |
| 19 | Kamatamare Sanuki | 42 | 8 | 14 | 20 | 41 | 61 | −20 | 38 | |
| 20 | Renofa Yamaguchi | 42 | 11 | 5 | 26 | 48 | 69 | −21 | 38 | |
| 21 | Roasso Kumamoto | 42 | 9 | 10 | 23 | 36 | 59 | −23 | 37 | |
| 22 | Thespakusatsu Gunma (R) | 42 | 5 | 5 | 32 | 32 | 88 | −56 | 20 | Relegation to 2018 J3 League (Note: Direct exchange between J2 and J3 is subject to eligibility of J2-licensed teams in top 2 of 2017 J3 League.) |

Updated to match(es) played on 28 November 2017. Source: 2017 MEIJI YASUDA J2 LEAGUE League table
Rules for classification: 1) Points; 2) Goal difference; 3) Goals scored
(C) Champions; (O) Play-off winners; (P) Promoted; (R) Relegated

== J3 League ==
| Pos | Team | Pld | W | D | L | GF | GA | GD | Pts | Promotion |
|---|---|---|---|---|---|---|---|---|---|---|
| 1 | Blaublitz Akita (C) | 32 | 18 | 7 | 7 | 53 | 31 | +22 | 61 | Ineligible for promotion to 2018 J2 League |
| 2 | Tochigi SC (P) | 32 | 16 | 12 | 4 | 44 | 24 | +20 | 60 | Promotion to 2018 J2 League (Note: Only teams that hold a J2 license are eligible for promotion.) |
| 3 | Azul Claro Numazu | 32 | 16 | 11 | 5 | 60 | 27 | +33 | 59 | |
| 4 | Kagoshima United | 32 | 17 | 4 | 11 | 49 | 37 | +12 | 55 | |
| 5 | Nagano Parceiro | 32 | 13 | 11 | 8 | 34 | 25 | +9 | 50 | |
| 6 | FC Ryukyu | 32 | 13 | 11 | 8 | 44 | 36 | +8 | 50 | |
| 7 | Fujieda MYFC | 32 | 12 | 11 | 9 | 50 | 43 | +7 | 47 | |
| 8 | Kataller Toyama | 32 | 13 | 8 | 11 | 37 | 33 | +4 | 47 | |
| 9 | Giravanz Kitakyushu | 32 | 13 | 7 | 12 | 44 | 37 | +7 | 46 | |
| 10 | Fukushima United | 32 | 13 | 4 | 15 | 39 | 43 | −4 | 43 | |
| 11 | FC Tokyo U-23 | 32 | 12 | 7 | 13 | 36 | 47 | −11 | 43 | |
| 12 | SC Sagamihara | 32 | 9 | 12 | 11 | 34 | 41 | −7 | 39 | |
| 13 | Cerezo Osaka U-23 | 32 | 8 | 11 | 13 | 39 | 43 | −4 | 35 | |
| 14 | YSCC Yokohama | 32 | 8 | 8 | 16 | 41 | 54 | −13 | 32 | |
| 15 | Grulla Morioka | 32 | 7 | 8 | 17 | 32 | 49 | −17 | 29 | |
| 16 | Gamba Osaka U-23 | 32 | 7 | 5 | 20 | 31 | 65 | −34 | 26 | |
| 17 | Gainare Tottori | 32 | 4 | 9 | 19 | 31 | 63 | −32 | 21 | |

Source: 2017 MEIJI YASUDA J3 LEAGUE League table
Rules for classification: 1) Points; 2) Goal difference; 3) Goals scored; 4th) head-to-head results; 5th) disciplinary points; 6th) draw
(C) Champions; (P) Promoted

== Japan Football League ==
| Pos | Team | Pld | W | D | L | GF | GA | GD | Pts | Qualification |
|---|---|---|---|---|---|---|---|---|---|---|
| 1 | Honda FC (C) | 30 | 21 | 7 | 2 | 72 | 20 | +52 | 70 | (Note: To qualify for promotion, a club must hold a 100 Year Plan status, obtain J3 license (marked in bold in the table), and finish both in the top 4 of the JFL, and either 1st or 2nd among the promotion-eligible clubs.) |
| 2 | ReinMeer Aomori | 30 | 17 | 10 | 3 | 44 | 28 | +16 | 61 | |
| 3 | Sony Sendai | 30 | 18 | 5 | 7 | 64 | 36 | +28 | 59 | |
| 4 | FC Osaka | 30 | 16 | 7 | 7 | 59 | 32 | +27 | 55 | |
| 5 | **Vanraure Hachinohe** | 30 | 15 | 6 | 9 | 41 | 31 | +10 | 51 | |
| 6 | **FC Imabari** | 30 | 12 | 12 | 6 | 54 | 36 | +18 | 48 | |
| 7 | **Nara Club** | 30 | 10 | 10 | 10 | 41 | 51 | −10 | 40 | |
| 8 | Honda Lock | 30 | 9 | 7 | 14 | 36 | 46 | −10 | 34 | |
| 9 | Maruyasu Okazaki | 30 | 9 | 7 | 14 | 35 | 46 | −11 | 34 | |
| 10 | Ryutsu Keizai Dragons | 30 | 8 | 10 | 12 | 38 | 51 | −13 | 34 | |
| 11 | Tokyo Musashino City | 30 | 8 | 9 | 13 | 44 | 47 | −3 | 33 | |
| 12 | Veertien Mie | 30 | 7 | 8 | 15 | 35 | 46 | −11 | 29 | |
| 13 | MIO Biwako Shiga | 30 | 6 | 9 | 15 | 33 | 51 | −18 | 27 | |
| 14 | Verspah Oita | 30 | 5 | 12 | 13 | 27 | 46 | −19 | 27 | |
| 15 | Briobecca Urayasu (R) | 30 | 6 | 8 | 16 | 24 | 46 | −22 | 26 | Relegation to 2018 Regional Leagues |
| 16 | Tochigi Uva (R) | 30 | 5 | 9 | 16 | 22 | 56 | −34 | 24 | Relegation to 2018 Regional Leagues |

Updated to match(es) played on 13 November 2017. Source: JFL website (in Japanese)
Rules for classification: 1) Points; 2) Goal difference; 3) Goals scored; 4) Head-to-head results; 5) Disciplinary points; 6) Draw
(C) Champions; (R) Relegated

== National team (Men) ==
=== Results ===
| 23 March 2017 2018 FIFA World Cup qualification (AFC) Round 3 | United Arab Emirates | 0–2 | Japan | (United Arab Emirates) Al Ain, UAE |
| 19:30 UTC+4 | | Report (FIFA); Report (AFC) | Kubo 14'; Konno 52' | Stadium: Hazza Bin Zayed Stadium; Attendance: 23,725; Referee: Ravshan Irmatov (Uzbekistan) |

| 28 March 2017 2018 FIFA World Cup qualification (AFC) Round 3 | Japan | 4–0 | Thailand | Saitama, Japan |
| 19:35 UTC+9 | Kagawa 8'; Okazaki 19'; Kubo 57'; Yoshida 83' | Report (FIFA); Report (AFC) | | Stadium: Saitama Stadium 2002; Attendance: 59,003; Referee: Kim Dong-jin (South Korea) |

| June 7 2017 Kirin Challenge Cup | Japan | 1−1 | Syria | Chōfu, Tokyo, Japan |
| 19:30 JST | Konno 58' | Report (PDF) | Mardikian 48' | Stadium: Ajinomoto Stadium; Attendance: 43,608; Referee: Daniel Stefański (Poland) |

| 13 June 2017 2018 FIFA World Cup qualification (AFC) Round 3 | Iraq | 1–1 | Japan | Tehran, Iran |
| 16:55 UTC+4:30 | Kamel 73' | Report (FIFA); Report (AFC) | Osako 8' | Stadium: Shahid Dastgerdi Stadium; Attendance: 983; Referee: Fu Ming (China PR) |

| 31 August 2017 2018 FIFA World Cup qualification (AFC) Round 3 | Japan | 2–0 | Australia | Saitama, Japan |
| 19:35 UTC+9 | Asano 41'; Ideguchi 82' | Report (FIFA); Report (AFC) | | Stadium: Saitama Stadium 2002; Attendance: 59,492; Referee: Alireza Faghani (Iran) |

| 5 September 2017 2018 FIFA World Cup qualification (AFC) Round 3 | Saudi Arabia | 1–0 | Japan | Jeddah, Saudi Arabia |
| 20:30 UTC+3 | Al-Muwallad 63' | Report (FIFA); Report (AFC) | | Stadium: King Abdullah Sports City; Attendance: 62,165; Referee: Valentin Kovalenko (Uzbekistan) |

| October 6 2017 Kirin Challenge Cup | Japan | 2−1 | New Zealand | Toyota, Japan |
| 19:30 JST | Osako 50' (pen.); Kurata 87' | Report (PDF) | Wood 58' | Stadium: Toyota Stadium; Attendance: 38,461; Referee: Liu Kwok Man (Hong Kong) |

| October 10 2017 Kirin Challenge Cup | Japan | 3−3 | Haiti | Yokohama, Japan |
| 19:30 JST | Kurata 7'; Sugimoto 17'; Kagawa 90+2' | Report (PDF) | Lafrance 28'; Nazon 53', 78' | Stadium: Nissan Stadium; Attendance: 47,420; Referee: Peter Green (Australia) |

| 10 November 2017 International friendly | Japan | 1–3 | Brazil | Villeneuve d'Ascq, France |
| 13:00 UTC+1 | Makino 63' | Report (ESPN) | Neymar 10' (pen.); Marcelo 17'; Gabriel Jesus 36' | Stadium: Stade Pierre-Mauroy; Attendance: 16,922; Referee: Benoît Bastien (France) |

| 14 November 2017 International friendly | Belgium | 1–0 | Japan | Bruges, Belgium |
| 20:45 UTC+1 | Lukaku 72' | Report (ESPN); Report (UEFA) | | Stadium: Jan Breydel Stadium; Attendance: 21,000; Referee: Danny Makkelie (Netherlands) |

| 9 December 2017 2017 EAFF E-1 Football Championship Final Round | Japan | 1–0 | North Korea | Chōfu, Tokyo, Japan |
| 19:15 UTC+9 | Ideguchi 90+3' | Report | | Stadium: Ajinomoto Stadium; Attendance: 20,806; Referee: Chris Beath (Australia) |

| 12 December 2017 2017 EAFF E-1 Football Championship Final Round | Japan | 2–1 | China | Chōfu, Tokyo, Japan |
| 19:15 UTC+9 | Kobayashi 84'; Shōji 88' | Report | Yu Dabao 90+3' (pen.) | Stadium: Ajinomoto Stadium; Attendance: 17,220; Referee: Muhammad Taqi (Singapore) |

| 16 December 2017 2017 EAFF E-1 Football Championship Final Round | Japan | 1–4 | South Korea | Chōfu, Tokyo, Japan |
| 19:15 UTC+9 | Kobayashi 3' (pen.) | Report | Kim Shin-wook 13', 35'; Jung Woo-young 23'; Yeom Ki-hun 69' | Stadium: Ajinomoto Stadium; Attendance: 36,645; Referee: Chris Beath (Australia) |

Win Draw Loss

=== Players statistics ===
| Player | -2016 | 03.23 | 03.28 | 06.07 | 06.13 | 08.31 | 09.05 | 10.06 | 10.10 | 11.10 | 11.14 | 12.09 | 12.12 | 12.16 | 2017 | Total |
| Shinji Okazaki | 106(49) | O | O(1) | O | - | O | O | - | - | - | - | - | - | - | 5(1) | 111(50) |
| Makoto Hasebe | 104(2) | - | - | - | - | O | - | - | - | O | - | - | - | - | 2(0) | 106(2) |
| Yuto Nagatomo | 91(3) | O | O | O | O | O | O | O | O | O | O | - | - | - | 10(0) | 101(3) |
| Yasuyuki Konno | 87(2) | O(1) | - | O(1) | O | - | - | - | - | - | - | O | O | O | 6(2) | 93(4) |
| Keisuke Honda | 86(36) | O | O | O | O | - | O | - | - | - | - | - | - | - | 5(0) | 91(36) |
| Shinji Kagawa | 84(27) | O | O(1) | O | - | - | - | O | O(1) | - | - | - | - | - | 5(2) | 89(29) |
| Eiji Kawashima | 72(0) | O | O | O | O | O | O | O | - | O | O | - | - | - | 9(0) | 81(0) |
| Maya Yoshida | 71(9) | O | O(1) | O | O | O | O | O | - | O | O | - | - | - | 9(1) | 80(10) |
| Hiroshi Kiyotake | 42(5) | - | O | - | - | - | - | - | - | - | - | - | - | - | 1(0) | 43(5) |
| Masato Morishige | 39(2) | O | O | - | - | - | - | - | - | - | - | - | - | - | 2(0) | 41(2) |
| Hiroki Sakai | 32(0) | O | O | O | O | O | O | O | - | O | O | - | - | - | 9(0) | 41(0) |
| Gotoku Sakai | 32(0) | - | O | - | O | - | - | - | O | - | O | - | - | - | 4(0) | 36(0) |
| Hotaru Yamaguchi | 30(2) | O | O | O | - | O | O | O | - | O | O | - | - | - | 8(0) | 38(2) |
| Tomoaki Makino | 24(2) | - | - | - | - | - | - | O | O | O(1) | O | - | - | - | 4(1) | 28(3) |
| Genki Haraguchi | 20(6) | O | O | O | O | O | O | - | O | O | O | - | - | - | 9(0) | 29(6) |
| Takashi Inui | 19(2) | - | - | O | - | O | - | O | O | O | O | - | - | - | 6(0) | 25(2) |
| Yoshinori Muto | 19(2) | - | - | - | - | - | - | O | O | - | - | - | - | - | 2(0) | 21(2) |
| Takashi Usami | 18(3) | - | O | - | - | - | - | - | - | - | - | - | - | - | 1(0) | 19(3) |
| Yuya Osako | 17(5) | O | - | O | O(1) | O | - | O(1) | O | O | O | - | - | - | 8(2) | 25(7) |
| Gaku Shibasaki | 13(3) | - | - | - | - | - | O | - | - | - | - | - | - | - | 1(0) | 14(3) |
| Takuma Asano | 10(2) | - | - | O | - | O(1) | O | O | O | O | O | - | - | - | 7(1) | 17(3) |
| Mu Kanazaki | 10(2) | - | - | - | - | - | - | - | - | - | - | O | - | - | 1(0) | 11(2) |
| Yu Kobayashi | 8(0) | - | - | - | - | - | - | - | - | - | - | O | O(1) | O(1) | 3(2) | 11(2) |
| Wataru Endo | 7(0) | - | - | - | O | - | - | O | O | O | - | - | - | - | 4(0) | 11(0) |
| Kengo Kawamata | 5(1) | - | - | - | - | - | - | - | - | - | - | O | O | O | 3(0) | 8(1) |
| Yuki Kobayashi | 2(1) | - | - | - | - | - | - | O | O | - | - | - | - | - | 2(0) | 4(1) |
| Yuya Kubo | 2(0) | O(1) | O(1) | O | O | O | O | O | - | O | O | - | - | - | 9(2) | 11(2) |
| Gen Shoji | 2(0) | - | - | O | O | O | O | - | O | - | - | O | O(1) | O | 8(1) | 10(1) |
| Masaaki Higashiguchi | 2(0) | - | - | - | - | - | - | - | O | - | - | - | O | - | 2(0) | 4(0) |
| Ryota Morioka | 2(0) | - | - | - | - | - | - | - | - | O | O | - | - | - | 2(0) | 4(0) |
| Shogo Taniguchi | 2(0) | - | - | - | - | - | - | - | - | - | - | O | - | - | 1(0) | 3(0) |
| Yojiro Takahagi | 2(0) | - | - | - | - | - | - | - | - | - | - | O | - | - | 1(0) | 3(0) |
| Shu Kurata | 1(0) | O | - | O | O | - | - | O(1) | O(1) | - | - | O | O | O | 8(2) | 9(2) |
| Ryota Oshima | 1(0) | - | - | - | - | - | - | - | - | - | - | - | O | - | 1(0) | 2(0) |
| Yosuke Ideguchi | 0(0) | - | - | O | O | O(1) | O | O | O | O | O | O(1) | O | O | 11(2) | 11(2) |
| Kenyu Sugimoto | 0(0) | - | - | - | - | - | O | O | O(1) | O | O | - | - | - | 5(1) | 5(1) |
| Shintaro Kurumaya | 0(0) | - | - | - | - | - | - | - | O | - | - | O | - | O | 3(0) | 3(0) |
| Junya Ito | 0(0) | - | - | - | - | - | - | - | - | - | - | O | O | O | 3(0) | 3(0) |
| Hiroyuki Abe | 0(0) | - | - | - | - | - | - | - | - | - | - | O | O | O | 3(0) | 3(0) |
| Kosuke Nakamura | 0(0) | - | - | - | - | - | - | - | - | - | - | O | - | O | 2(0) | 2(0) |
| Naomichi Ueda | 0(0) | - | - | - | - | - | - | - | - | - | - | - | O | O | 2(0) | 2(0) |
| Genta Miura | 0(0) | - | - | - | - | - | - | - | - | - | - | - | O | O | 2(0) | 2(0) |
| Shoma Doi | 0(0) | - | - | - | - | - | - | - | - | - | - | - | O | O | 2(0) | 2(0) |
| Kazuki Nagasawa | 0(0) | - | - | - | - | - | - | - | - | - | O | - | - | - | 1(0) | 1(0) |
| Sei Muroya | 0(0) | - | - | - | - | - | - | - | - | - | - | O | - | - | 1(0) | 1(0) |
| Shuto Yamamoto | 0(0) | - | - | - | - | - | - | - | - | - | - | - | O | - | 1(0) | 1(0) |
| Kento Misao | 0(0) | - | - | - | - | - | - | - | - | - | - | - | - | O | 1(0) | 1(0) |

== National team (Women) ==
=== Results ===
| 2017.03.01 | Japan | 1–2 | Spain | Portugal |
| | Yokoyama ?' | | ? ?' ? ?' |

| 2017.03.03 | Japan | 2–0 | Iceland | Portugal |
| | Hasegawa ?', ?' |

| 2017.03.06 | Japan | 2–0 | Norway | Portugal |
| | Yokoyama ?', ?' |

| 2017.03.08 | Japan | 2–3 | Netherlands | Portugal |
| | Yokoyama ?' ?' (o.g.) | | ? ?' ? ?' ? ?' |

| 2017.04.09 | Japan | 3–0 | Costa Rica | Kumamoto, Japan |
| | Yokoyama ?'; Tanaka ?'; Momiki ?' | | | Stadium: Kumamoto Athletics Stadium |

| 2017.06.09 | Japan | 1–0 | Netherlands | Netherlands |
| | Yokoyama ?' |

| 2017.06.13 | Japan | 1–1 | Belgium | Belgium |
| | Sugasawa ?' | | ? ?' |

| 2017.07.27 | Japan | 1–1 | Brazil | United States |
| | Momiki ?' | | ? ?' |

| 2017.07.30 | Japan | 2–4 | Australia | United States |
| | Tanaka ?'; Momiki ?' | | ? ?' ? ?' ? ?' ? ?' |

| 2017.08.03 | Japan | 0–3 | United States | United States |
| | | | ? ?' ? ?' ? ?' |

| 2017.10.22 | Japan | 2–0 | Switzerland | Nagano, Japan |
| | Nakajima ?'; Tanaka ?' | | | Stadium: Minami Nagano Sports Park Stadium |

| 2017.11.24 | Japan | 2–0 | Jordan | Jordan |
| | Iwabuchi ?', ?' |

| 2017.12.08 | Japan | 3–2 | South Korea | Chiba, Japan |
| | Tanaka ?'; Nakajima ?'; Iwabuchi ?' | | ? ?' ? ?' | Stadium: Chiba Soga Football Stadium |

| 2017.12.11 | Japan | 1–0 | China | Chiba, Japan |
| | Tanaka ?' | | | Stadium: Chiba Soga Football Stadium |

| 2017.12.15 | Japan | 0–2 | North Korea | Chiba, Japan |
| | | | ? ?' ? ?' | Stadium: Chiba Soga Football Stadium |

=== Players statistics ===
| Player | -2016 | 03.01 | 03.03 | 03.06 | 03.08 | 04.09 | 06.09 | 06.13 | 07.27 | 07.30 | 08.03 | 10.22 | 11.24 | 12.08 | 12.11 | 12.15 | 2017 | Total |
| Mizuho Sakaguchi | 103(28) | O | - | O | O | O | O | O | O | - | O | O | O | O | O | O | 13(0) | 116(28) |
| Rumi Utsugi | 90(5) | O | O | O | O | O | - | - | O | O | O | O | O | O | O | O | 13(0) | 103(5) |
| Saki Kumagai | 81(0) | O | O | O | O | O | O | O | - | - | - | O | O | - | - | - | 9(0) | 90(0) |
| Aya Sameshima | 72(4) | O | O | O | O | - | O | O | O | - | O | O | O | O | O | O | 13(0) | 85(4) |
| Yuika Sugasawa | 39(10) | - | - | - | - | - | O | O(1) | O | - | - | - | - | - | - | O | 4(1) | 43(11) |
| Mana Iwabuchi | 37(8) | - | O | - | - | - | - | - | - | - | - | O | O(2) | O(1) | O | O | 6(3) | 43(11) |
| Emi Nakajima | 31(7) | O | O | O | O | O | O | O | O | O | O | O(1) | O | O(1) | O | O | 15(2) | 46(9) |
| Yuri Kawamura | 29(2) | - | O | O | O | - | - | - | - | - | - | - | - | - | - | - | 3(0) | 32(2) |
| Erina Yamane | 21(0) | O | - | - | - | - | - | O | - | - | - | - | - | - | - | - | 2(0) | 23(0) |
| Kumi Yokoyama | 13(5) | O(1) | O | O(2) | O(1) | O(1) | O(1) | O | O | O | O | O | - | - | - | - | 11(6) | 24(11) |
| Rika Masuya | 13(3) | O | - | - | O | - | - | - | - | - | - | - | - | - | - | - | 2(0) | 15(3) |
| Hikaru Naomoto | 8(0) | - | - | - | - | O | O | O | O | O | - | - | O | - | O | - | 7(0) | 15(0) |
| Mina Tanaka | 6(1) | O | O | O | O | O(1) | O | O | O | O(1) | O | O(1) | - | O(1) | O(1) | O | 14(5) | 20(6) |
| Ayaka Yamashita | 6(0) | - | O | - | O | - | O | - | O | - | O | - | - | - | - | - | 5(0) | 11(0) |
| Ami Sugita | 5(2) | - | - | - | - | - | - | O | - | - | - | - | - | - | - | - | 1(0) | 6(2) |
| Yu Nakasato | 3(0) | O | O | O | O | O | O | O | - | O | O | O | O | - | O | O | 13(0) | 16(0) |
| Mayu Sasaki | 3(0) | O | - | O | O | O | - | O | - | - | - | - | - | - | - | - | 5(0) | 8(0) |
| Sonoko Chiba | 3(0) | - | O | O | - | - | - | - | - | - | - | - | - | - | - | - | 2(0) | 5(0) |
| Hikari Takagi | 1(0) | O | O | O | O | O | O | O | O | O | - | - | O | O | - | O | 12(0) | 13(0) |
| Shiori Miyake | 1(0) | - | - | - | - | - | - | - | - | - | - | O | O | O | O | O | 5(0) | 6(0) |
| Yuka Momiki | 0(0) | O | O | O | O | O(1) | O | O | O(1) | O(1) | O | O | - | O | O | O | 14(3) | 14(3) |
| Yui Hasegawa | 0(0) | O | O(2) | O | O | O | O | O | O | O | O | O | O | O | - | - | 13(2) | 13(2) |
| Sakiko Ikeda | 0(0) | - | - | O | - | O | - | - | - | O | - | O | O | O | O | O | 8(0) | 8(0) |
| Ayumi Oya | 0(0) | - | - | - | - | O | O | O | O | O | - | - | O | O | O | - | 8(0) | 8(0) |
| Rin Sumida | 0(0) | - | - | - | - | O | O | - | - | O | O | - | O | - | O | O | 7(0) | 7(0) |
| Miho Manya | 0(0) | - | - | - | - | - | - | - | O | O | O | O | O | O | O | - | 7(0) | 7(0) |
| Nana Ichise | 0(0) | - | - | - | - | O | O | O | O | O | O | - | - | - | - | - | 6(0) | 6(0) |
| Madoka Haji | 0(0) | - | - | - | - | - | - | - | - | O | O | O | O | O | - | O | 6(0) | 6(0) |
| Hikaru Kitagawa | 0(0) | O | O | - | - | - | - | - | O | O | O | - | - | - | - | - | 5(0) | 5(0) |
| Kaede Nakamura | 0(0) | - | O | O | O | - | - | - | - | - | - | - | - | - | - | - | 3(0) | 3(0) |
| Mami Ueno | 0(0) | - | - | - | - | O | - | - | - | - | - | O | O | - | - | - | 3(0) | 3(0) |
| Shiho Tomari | 0(0) | - | - | - | - | - | - | - | O | - | O | - | - | - | - | - | 2(0) | 2(0) |
| Riho Sakamoto | 0(0) | - | - | - | - | - | - | - | - | O | - | - | - | - | - | - | 1(0) | 1(0) |
