= 2017 Tournament of Nations squads =

List of players competing at the inaugural edition of the Tournament of Nations

This article lists the squads for the 2017 Tournament of Nations, the inaugural edition of the Tournament of Nations. The cup consisted of a series of friendly games, and was held in the United States from 27 July to 3 August 2017. The four national teams involved in the tournament registered a squad of 23 players.

The age listed for each player is on 27 July 2017, the first day of the tournament. The club listed is the club for which the player last played a competitive match prior to the tournament. The nationality for each club reflects the national association (not the league) to which the club is affiliated. A flag is included for coaches that are of a different nationality than their own national team.

== Squads ==
=== Australia ===
Coach: Alen Stajcic

The final squad was announced on 17 July 2017. Following the second match of the tournament, Lydia Williams suffered an injury and was replaced by Teagan Micah.

No.	Pos.	Player	Date of birth (age)	Caps	Goals	Club
1	GK	Lydia Williams	13 May 1988 (aged 29)	60	0	(United States) Houston Dash
2	DF	Gema Simon	19 July 1990 (aged 27)	8	0	(Norway) Avaldsnes
3	DF	Caitlin Cooper	12 February 1988 (aged 29)	7	1	(Australia) Illawarra Stingrays
4	DF	Clare Polkinghorne	1 February 1989 (aged 28)	95	7	(Australia) Brisbane Roar
5	DF	Laura Alleway	28 November 1989 (aged 27)	48	2	Unattached
6	MF	Chloe Logarzo	22 December 1994 (aged 22)	12	0	(Norway) Avaldsnes
7	DF	Steph Catley	26 January 1994 (aged 23)	57	2	(United States) Orlando Pride
8	MF	Elise Kellond-Knight	10 August 1990 (aged 26)	80	1	(Germany) Turbine Potsdam
9	FW	Caitlin Foord	11 November 1994 (aged 22)	53	8	(Japan) Vegalta Sendai
10	MF	Emily van Egmond	12 July 1993 (aged 24)	61	14	(Germany) VfL Wolfsburg
11	FW	Lisa De Vanna	14 November 1984 (aged 32)	121	40	(Australia) South Melbourne
13	MF	Tameka Butt	16 June 1991 (aged 26)	56	7	(Norway) Klepp
14	DF	Alanna Kennedy	21 January 1995 (aged 22)	52	3	(United States) Orlando Pride
15	FW	Emily Gielnik	13 May 1992 (aged 25)	13	4	(Norway) Avaldsnes
16	FW	Hayley Raso	15 September 1994 (aged 22)	16	1	(United States) Portland Thorns
17	FW	Princess Ibini	31 January 2000 (aged 17)	0	0	(Australia) FNSW NTC
18	GK	Mackenzie Arnold	25 February 1994 (aged 23)	12	0	(Australia) Brisbane Roar
18	GK	Teagan Micah	20 October 1997 (aged 19)	0	0	(United States) UCLA Bruins
19	MF	Katrina Gorry	13 August 1992 (aged 24)	52	13	(Japan) Vegalta Sendai
20	FW	Sam Kerr	10 September 1993 (aged 23)	50	8	(United States) Sky Blue
21	DF	Ellie Carpenter	28 April 2000 (aged 17)	7	1	(Australia) Western Sydney Wanderers
22	MF	Alex Chidiac	15 January 1999 (aged 18)	3	0	(Australia) Adelaide City

=== Brazil ===
Coach: (Portugal) Emily Lima

The final squad was announced on 10 July 2017.

No.	Pos.	Player	Date of birth (age)	Caps	Goals	Club
1	GK	Bárbara	4 July 1988 (aged 29)	31	0	(Brazil) Kindermann
2	DF	Maurine	14 January 1986 (aged 31)	27	5	(Brazil) Santos
3	DF	Bruna Benites	16 October 1985 (aged 31)	43	5	(United States) Houston Dash
5	MF	Djenifer	25 June 1995 (aged 22)	3	0	(Brazil) Iranduba
6	DF	Tamires	10 October 1987 (aged 29)	56	4	(Denmark) Fortuna Hjørring
7	MF	Gabi Nunes	10 March 1997 (aged 20)	7	0	(Brazil) Corinthians/Audax
8	MF	Maria	7 July 1993 (aged 24)	8	0	(Brazil) Santos
9	MF	Debinha	20 October 1991 (aged 25)	47	17	(United States) North Carolina Courage
10	FW	Marta	19 February 1986 (aged 31)	38	20	(United States) Orlando Pride
12	GK	Dani Neuhaus	21 March 1993 (aged 24)	0	0	(Brazil) Santos
13	DF	Andréia Rosa	8 July 1984 (aged 33)	9	0	(Norway) Avaldsnes
14	FW	Chú	27 February 1990 (aged 27)	10	0	(Brazil) São José
15	DF	Letícia Santos	2 December 1994 (aged 22)	4	0	(Germany) SC Sand
16	FW	Bia Zaneratto	17 December 1993 (aged 23)	40	11	(South Korea) Incheon Hyundai Steel Red Angels
17	MF	Andressinha	1 May 1995 (aged 22)	46	5	(United States) Houston Dash
18	MF	Francielle	18 October 1989 (aged 27)	11	1	(Norway) Avaldsnes
19	FW	Ludmila	1 December 1994 (aged 22)	1	1	(Brazil) São José
20	MF	Camila	10 October 1994 (aged 22)	8	0	(United States) Orlando Pride
21	DF	Mônica	21 April 1987 (aged 30)	38	4	(United States) Orlando Pride
22	DF	Jucinara	3 August 1993 (aged 23)	3	0	(Brazil) Corinthians/Audax

=== Japan ===
Coach: Asako Takakura

The final squad was announced on 14 July 2017. On 21 July 2017, Kaede Nakamura withdrew due to injury and was replaced with Miho Manya.

No.	Pos.	Player	Date of birth (age)	Caps	Goals	Club
1	GK	Sakiko Ikeda	8 September 1992 (aged 24)			(Japan) Urawa Red Diamonds
2	DF	Hikari Takagi	21 May 1993 (aged 24)			(Japan) Nojima Stella Kanagawa Sagamihara
3	DF	Aya Sameshima	16 June 1987 (aged 30)			(Japan) INAC Kobe Leonessa
4	DF	Miho Manya	5 November 1996 (aged 20)			(Japan) Vegalta Sendai
5	MF	Madoka Haji	8 July 1988 (aged 29)	0	0	(Japan) Iga FC Kunoichi
6	MF	Rumi Utsugi	5 December 1988 (aged 28)			(United States) Seattle Reign
7	MF	Emi Nakajima	27 September 1990 (aged 26)			(Japan) INAC Kobe Leonessa
8	DF	Riho Sakamoto	7 July 1992 (aged 25)	0	0	(Japan) AC Nagano Parceiro
9	FW	Kumi Yokoyama	13 August 1993 (aged 23)			(Germany) 1. FFC Frankfurt
10	MF	Mizuho Sakaguchi	15 October 1987 (aged 29)			(Japan) Nippon TV Beleza
11	FW	Mina Tanaka	28 April 1994 (aged 23)			(Japan) Nippon TV Beleza
12	MF	Hikaru Naomoto	3 March 1994 (aged 23)			(Japan) Urawa Red Diamonds
13	FW	Yuika Sugasawa	5 October 1990 (aged 26)			(Japan) Urawa Red Diamonds
14	MF	Yu Nakasato	14 July 1994 (aged 23)			(Japan) Nippon TV Beleza
15	FW	Yuka Momiki	9 April 1996 (aged 21)			(Japan) Nippon TV Beleza
16	MF	Rin Sumida	12 January 1996 (aged 21)			(Japan) Nippon TV Beleza
17	MF	Yui Hasegawa	29 January 1997 (aged 20)			(Japan) Nippon TV Beleza
18	GK	Ayaka Yamashita	29 September 1995 (aged 21)			(Japan) Nippon TV Beleza
19	DF	Hikaru Kitagawa	10 May 1997 (aged 20)			(Japan) Urawa Red Diamonds
20	DF	Ayumi Oya	8 November 1994 (aged 22)			(Japan) Ehime
21	GK	Ayaka Saitō	26 August 1991 (aged 25)	0	0	(Japan) Vegalta Sendai
22	FW	Shiho Tomari	26 March 1990 (aged 27)	0	0	(Japan) AC Nagano Parceiro
23	DF	Nana Ichise	4 August 1997 (aged 19)			(Japan) Vegalta Sendai

=== United States ===
Coach: Jill Ellis

The final squad was announced on 20 July 2017.

No.	Pos.	Player	Date of birth (age)	Caps	Goals	Club
1	GK	Alyssa Naeher	April 20, 1988 (aged 29)	15	0	(United States) Chicago Red Stars
2	FW	Sydney Leroux	May 7, 1990 (aged 27)	75	35	(United States) Kansas City
3	MF	Sam Mewis	October 9, 1992 (aged 24)	25	4	(United States) North Carolina Courage
4	DF	Becky Sauerbrunn	June 6, 1985 (aged 32)	126	0	(United States) Kansas City
5	DF	Kelley O'Hara	August 4, 1988 (aged 28)	96	2	(United States) Sky Blue
6	MF	Morgan Brian	February 26, 1993 (aged 24)	66	6	(United States) Houston Dash
7	DF	Abby Dahlkemper	May 13, 1993 (aged 24)	4	0	(United States) North Carolina Courage
8	DF	Julie Ertz	April 6, 1992 (aged 25)	49	8	(United States) Chicago Red Stars
9	FW	Lindsey Horan	May 26, 1994 (aged 23)	35	3	(United States) Portland Thorns
10	MF	Carli Lloyd	July 16, 1982 (aged 35)	239	97	(United States) Houston Dash
11	DF	Ali Krieger	July 28, 1984 (aged 32)	98	1	(United States) Orlando Pride
12	FW	Lynn Williams	May 21, 1993 (aged 24)	8	2	(United States) North Carolina Courage
13	FW	Alex Morgan	July 2, 1989 (aged 28)	125	73	(United States) Orlando Pride
14	DF	Casey Short	August 23, 1990 (aged 26)	10	0	(United States) Chicago Red Stars
15	MF	Megan Rapinoe	July 5, 1985 (aged 32)	121	31	(United States) Seattle Reign
16	DF	Taylor Smith	December 1, 1993 (aged 23)	0	0	(United States) North Carolina Courage
17	MF	Margaret Purce	September 18, 1995 (aged 21)	0	0	(United States) Boston Breakers
18	GK	Jane Campbell	February 17, 1995 (aged 22)	1	0	(United States) Houston Dash
19	FW	Crystal Dunn	July 3, 1992 (aged 25)	52	22	(England) Chelsea
20	MF	Allie Long	August 13, 1987 (aged 29)	27	5	(United States) Portland Thorns
21	GK	Abby Smith	October 4, 1993 (aged 23)	0	0	(United States) Boston Breakers
22	FW	Mallory Pugh	April 29, 1998 (aged 19)	23	4	(United States) Washington Spirit
23	FW	Christen Press	December 29, 1988 (aged 28)	87	42	(United States) Chicago Red Stars

== Player representation ==
=== By club ===
Clubs with 3 or more players represented are listed.

Players	Club
7	(Japan) Nippon TV Beleza, (United States) Orlando Pride
6	(United States) Houston Dash
5	(Japan) Vegalta Sendai, (Norway) Avaldsnes, (United States) North Carolina Courage
4	(Japan) Urawa Red Diamonds, (United States) Chicago Red Stars
3	(Brazil) Santos, (United States) Portland Thorns

=== By club nationality ===
Players	Clubs
35	United States
23	Japan
9	Brazil
7	Australia
6	Norway
4	Germany
1	Denmark, England, South Korea

=== By club federation ===
Players	Federation
35	CONCACAF
31	AFC
12	UEFA
9	CONMEBOL

=== By representatives of domestic league ===
National squad	Players
United States	22
Japan	21
Brazil	9
Australia	7
