= Mizuki =

- Gender: Unisex
- Language: Japanese

Origin
- Origin: Japanese
- Meaning: Different meanings depending on the kanji used
- Region of origin: Japan

Mizuki is both a Japanese surname (水木, みずき, ミズキ) and a unisex Japanese given name which means "auspicious hope". Notable people with the name include:

== Surname ==
- Alisa Mizuki (観月 ありさ; born 1976), J-pop singer and actress
- Gai Mizuki (水樹 凱), Japanese manga artist
- Hakase Mizuki (水月 博士), Japanese manga artist
- Hatsuhiko Mizuki (水木 薫; 1939-2015), Japanese rower
- Ichirou Mizuki (水木 一郎; 1948–2022), Japanese actor, voice actor and singer
- Joh Mizuki (水木 襄; 1938–1991), Japanese actor
- Kaoru Mizuki (水木 薫; born 1959), Japanese actress
- Kyoko Mizuki (水木 杏子; born 1949), Japanese writer
- Nana Mizuki (水樹 奈々; born 1980), Japanese voice actress and singer
- Shigeru Mizuki (水木 しげる; 1922–2015), Japanese manga artist, illustrator and folklorist
- Yoko Mizuki (水木 洋子; 1910–2003), Japanese screenwriter

== Given name ==
- Mizuki, a Japanese singer and member of Shiritsu Ebisu Chugaku
- Mizuki Aiba (饗庭 瑞生; born 1997), Japanese footballer
- Mizuki Ando (安藤 瑞季; born 1999), Japanese football player
- Mizuki Arai (新井 瑞希; born 1997), Japanese footballer
- Mizuki Fujii (藤井 瑞希; born 1988), Japanese badminton player
- Mizuki Fukumura (譜久村 聖; born 1996), Japanese pop singer, former Morning Musume member
- Mizuki Hamada (賓田 水輝; born 1990), American-born Japanese football defender
- Mizuki Hanayama (花山 水樹; born 2006), Japanese former idol and member of the group E-girls
- Mizuki Hayashi (林 瑞輝; born 1996), Japanese footballer
- Mizuki Hirai (平井 瑞希; born 2007), Japanese swimmer
- Mizuki Hiruta (晝田 瑞希; born 1996), Japanese professional boxer
- Mizuki Hori (堀 瑞輝; born 1998), Japanese baseball player
- Mizuki Ichimaru (市丸 瑞希; born 1997), Japanese footballer
- Mizuki Ikeda (池田 瑞紀; born 2004), Japanese racing cyclist
- Mizuki Inoue (井上 水樹; born 1994), Japanese female kickboxer and mixed martial artist
- Mizuki Itagaki (板垣 瑞生; 2000–2025), Japanese actor and singer
- Mizuki Kaminade (上撫 瑞希; born 1995), Japanese professional wrestler
- Mizuki Kawashita (河下 水希; born 1971), Japanese manga and dōjinshi artist
- Mizuki Kirihara, (桐原 美月) Japanese idol and member of the group Candy Tune
- Mizuki Kitaguchi, (born 1994) Japanese curler
- Mizuki Kubodera, (久保寺 水紀, born 1986) beauty pageant contestant who represented Japan in Miss World 2008
- Mizuki Kuwabara (桑原 みずき; born 1992), Japanese former member of idol group SKE48
- Mizuki Matsuda (松田 瑞生; born 1995), Japanese long distance runner
- Mizuki Murota, Japanese former member of idol group Angerme
- Mizuki Nishiyama (西山 瑞貴; born 1998), Japanese artist
- Mizuki Noguchi (野口 みずき; born 1978), Japanese female long-distance track and field athlete
- Mizuki Nomura (野村 美月; born 1978), Japanese light novelist
- Mizuki Ōta (大田 美月; born 2006), Japanese idol and member of the idol group Hinatazaka46
- Mizuki Otake (大竹 望月; born 2002), Japanese badminton player
- Mizuki Ogawa (小川美月, aka Léa, born 1995), Japanese K-Pop idol, former member of Skarf & current member of Secret Number
- Mizuki Saihara (齋原 みず稀; born 1997), Japanese professional footballer
- Mizuki Sano (佐野 瑞樹; born 1973), Japanese actor
- Mizuki Sonoda (園田 瑞貴; born 1996), Japanese professional footballer
- Mizuki Sugimura (杉村美寿希; born 2003), Japanese judoka
- Mizuki Tanimoto (谷本 観月; born 1994), Japanese long distance runner
- Mizuki Tsujimura (辻村 深月; born 1980), Japanese writer
- Mizuki Watanabe (渡辺 みづき; born 1981), Japanese pop/rock singer
- Mizuki Watase (渡瀬 瑞基; born 1991), Japanese professional wrestler
- Mizuki Yamada, (1928–2008) Japanese sailor
- Mizuki Yamamoto (山本 美月; born 1991), Japanese actress and model
- Mizuki Yamashita (山下 美月; born 1999), Japanese idol and actress
- Mizuki Yamauchi (山内 瑞葵; born 2001), Japanese idol and member of the idol group AKB48
- Mizuki Yoshida (吉田 美月喜; born 2003), Japanese actress
- Mizuki Yuina (結名 美月; born 1995), Japanese voice actress

== Fictional characters ==
- Captain Mizuki (ミズキ船長), in the manga One-Punch Man
- Hajime Mizuki (観月 はじめ), in the manga/anime series The Prince of Tennis
- Kaho Mizuki (観月 歌帆), in the anime and manga Cardcaptor Sakura
- Karen Mizuki (水木 カレン), a character in the Super Sentai series J.A.K.Q. Dengekitai
- Magari Mizuki (十三月 愛狩), a character in the video game Corpse Party: Blood Drive
- Mizuki, the main character in the manga of the same name by Nao Yazawa.
- Mizuki Asahina (朝比奈 霧霞), a character in the manga Nightmare Inspector: Yumekui Kenbun
- Mizuki (ミズキ), a minor antagonist in the beginning of the manga/anime series Naruto
- Mizuki, an enemy character in the video game The Punisher
- Mizuki Ashiya (芦屋 瑞稀), a character in the shōjo manga Hana-Kimi
- Mizuki Himeji (姫路 瑞希), a character in the manga and anime Baka and Test
- Mizuki Inaba (稲葉 瑞樹), a supporting character in the manga and anime Full Metal Panic!
- Mizuki Mochizuki (望月 美月), a character in the shōjo manga Kagen no Tsuki
- Mizuki Rashojin (羅将神 ミヅキ), a character in the video game series Samurai Shodown
- Mizuki Suzushiro (鈴白 瑞樹), the main character in the doujin series Boku Girl
- Mizuki (瑞希), a character in the manga and anime series Kamisama Hajimemashita
- Mizuki (ミズキ), a character from the BL visual novel DRAMAtical Murder
- Mizuki Kanzaki (神崎 美月), a main character in the anime series Aikatsu!
- Mizuki Akabayashi (赤林 海月), a character from the Durarara! light novel series
- Mizuki Shibata (柴田 美月), a character in The Irregular at Magic High School light novel series
- Mizuki (瑞希), the main character of the Kiyoshi Kurosawa film Journey to the Shore
- Mizuki Akiyama, a character from the mobile game Hatsune Miku: Colorful Stage!
- Mizuki Okiura, a character from the video game AI: The Somnium Files
- Mizuki, a character from Fortnite introduced in Chapter 4: Season 2 titled "MEGA"
- Mizuki, a protagonist character from the PC and mobile game Arknights
- Yumemizuki Mizuki (夢見月 瑞希), a character in the 2020 video game Genshin Impact
- Mizuki Makabe, a character in the idol game series The Idolmaster Million Live!
- Mizuki Kawano, a support hero from the Overwatch franchise

== See also ==
- Mizuki Station
- Mizuki Castle
