= Best of Vocal Works (nZk) =

BEST OF VOCAL WORKS [nZk]

Compilation album by Hiroyuki Sawano
- Released: February 4, 2015
- Genre: Rock
- Length: 78:08
- Language: German; English; Japanese
- Label: DefSTAR Records
- Producer: Hiroyuki Sawano; Yasuchi Horiguchi (co.&exec); Shunsuke Muramatsu (exec); Daisuke Katsurada (exec); Shunichi Kishimoto (exec)

Hiroyuki Sawano chronology
| BEST OF VOCAL WORKS [nZk] (2015) | BEST OF SOUNDTRACK [emU] (2015) |

BEST OF VOCAL WORKS [nZk] is the first greatest hits album by Hiroyuki Sawano, released on February 4, 2015, on DefSTAR Records. It contains some of his vocal works from Guilty Crown, Attack on Titan, Blue Exorcist, KILL la KILL, Sengoku Basara and Aldnoah.Zero.

== Track listing ==
All music is composed by Hiroyuki Sawano

| No. | Title | Lyrics | Vocals | Length |
|---|---|---|---|---|
| 1. | "βίος" (Bios) | Rie | Mika Kobayashi | 4:35 |
| 2. | "The Reluctant Heroes" | mpi | mpi | 4:25 |
| 3. | "Battle Scars" | David Whitaker | David Whitaker | 4:05 |
| 4. | "Wild War Dance" | mpi | Aimee Blackschleger | 3:25 |
| 5. | "Blumenkranz" ("Flower Wreath") | Rie | Cyua | 4:18 |
| 6. | "EGO" | mpi | Mika Kobayashi | 3:13 |
| 7. | "Hill Of Sorrow" | mpi | mpi | 4:10 |
| 8. | "Me & Creed" | mpi | Mika Kobayashi | 3:23 |
| 9. | "Till I Die" | cAnON. | CASG | 4:41 |
| 10. | "Ready to Go" | David Whitaker | David Whitaker | 4:17 |
| 11. | "Light your heart up" | cAnON. | Aimee Blackschleger | 3:55 |
| 12. | "friends" | mpi | mpi | 3:49 |
| 13. | "Rё∀˥" (Real) | Rie | Cyua | 4:13 |
| 14. | "Call me later" (nZk Plugless) | mpi | Mika Kobayashi | 3:23 |
| 15. | "Suck your blood" | mpi | Benjamin Anderson; mpi | 3:40 |
| 16. | "DOA" | mpi | Aimee Blackschleger | 3:26 |
| 17. | "Before my body is dry" | mpi; David Whitaker | Mika Kobayashi; David Whitaker | 4:06 |
| 18. | "RE:I AM" | Hiroyuki Sawano | Aimer | 5:46 |
| 19. | "A/Z" (by SawanoHiroyuki[nZk]:mizuki) | Hiroyuki Sawano | mizuki | 5:18 |
| Total length: | | | | 78:08 |

Personnel

- Hiroyuki Sawano
  - Programming
  - Keyboards (#1-5.7-13.15.16.17)
  - Piano (#6.13.14.18.19)
  - Background Vocals (#1.5.18.19)
- cAnON. - Background Vocals (#18)
- Mika Kobayashi
  - Vocals (#1.6.8.14.17)
  - Additional Voice (#7)
- mpi
  - Vocals (#2.7.12.15)
  - Additional Voice (#1)
  - Background Vocals (#1.5)
- David Whitaker：Rap (#3.10.17)
- Aimee Blackschleger：Vocals (#4.11.16)
- Cyua：Vocals (#5.13)
- CASG (Caramel Apple Sound Gadget)：Vocals (#9)
- Benjamin Anderson：Vocals (#15)
- Aimer：Vocals (#18)
- mizuki：Vocals (#19)
- Yu“masshoi”Yamauchi
  - Drums (#1.2.3.4.8.10.11.12.13.16.17.18.19)
  - Percussion (#14)
- Toshino Tanabe：Bass (#1.2.3.10.11.12.16.17.18.19)
- Hiroshi Iimuro：Guitars (#1.2.3.4.6.7.8.10.11.12.15.16.17.18)
- yassh!!：Background Vocals (#1.5.18)
- Kouichiro Muroya Group：Strings (#3.6.7.18)
- Otohiko Fujita、Yoshiyuki Uema、Tsutomu Isohata：Horn (#3.7)
- Atsushi Doyama、Jo Kishigami、Chie Matsushima：Horn (#3)
- Takeshi Taneda：Bass (#4.8)
- Tetsuro Touyama：Guitars (#5.13.14.19)
- Yasushi Katsumata：Horn (#7)
- Yuko Kawai、Hikaru、Sen、Melo-J：Background Vocals (#8.17.18)
- Yu Uchida：Background Vocals (#8.17)
- Yumiko Inoue、Hajime、KEI：Background Vocals (#8)
- Kaori Nishina：Background Vocals (#17)
- Akiko Shimodoi、Ai Inoue：Background Vocals (#18)
