= 2014 FIFA U-17 Women's World Cup =

Copa Mundial Femenina Sub-17 de la FIFA Costa Rica 2014

Tournament details
- Host country: Costa Rica
- Dates: 15 March – 4 April
- Teams: 16 (from 6 confederations)
- Venues: 4 (in 4 host cities)

Final positions
- Champions: Japan (1st title)
- Runners-up: Spain
- Third place: Italy
- Fourth place: Venezuela

Tournament statistics
- Matches played: 32
- Goals scored: 113 (3.53 per match)
- Attendance: 284,320 (8,885 per match)
- Top scorer(s): (Venezuela) Deyna Castellanos (Venezuela) Gabriela García (6 goals each)
- Best player: (Japan) Hina Sugita
- Best goalkeeper: (Japan) Mamiko Matsumoto
- Fair play award: Japan

The 2014 FIFA U-17 Women's World Cup was the fourth edition of the youth association football tournament for women under the age of 17. The final tournament was hosted in Costa Rica.

The competition was played from 15 March to 4 April 2014. Japan beat Spain in the final 2–0, the same score the same match ended in the group stage. Japan emerged as the fourth different champion in four editions.

The opening match of the tournament set a new tournament record with 34,453 spectators. In total, 284,320 supporters attended matches, averaging 8,885 per match and beating the 2012 record.

== Host selection ==
On 3 March 2011, FIFA announced that the tournament would be held in Costa Rica. There were six official bids.

- Costa Rica
- Ghana
- FYR Macedonia
- Russia
- United Arab Emirates
- Uzbekistan

Hosting rights were then stripped on 28 February 2013 due to problems in stadium construction. After receiving guarantees from both CONCACAF and the Costa Rican government, they were re-instated as hosts at an executive committee meeting in Zurich on 21 March 2013. The final was originally scheduled on 5 April, but was brought forward one day due to government elections.

== Qualified teams ==
The slot allocation was approved by the FIFA Executive Committee in May 2012. The Oceania Football Confederation qualifying tournament was scheduled for January 2014, FIFA however decided that it would be hosted too late then. Eventually FIFA and OFC in agreement with all member nations agreed to award the confederation spot to New Zealand. Just as New Zealand, Nigeria qualified without playing a match because two opponents withdrew their respective qualifying games. Defending champions France did not qualify.

In total 103 nations took part in the qualifying, three less than for the 2012 World Cup.

Confederation	Qualifying Tournament	Qualifiers
AFC (Asia)	2013 AFC U-16 Women's Championship	Japan; North Korea; China
CAF (Africa)	2013 African U-17 Women's World Cup Qualifying Tournament	Nigeria; Ghana; Zambia^{1}
CONCACAF (North, Central America and Caribbean)	Host nation	Costa Rica
CONCACAF (North, Central America and Caribbean)	2013 CONCACAF Women's U-17 Championship	Mexico; Canada
CONMEBOL (South America)	2013 South American Under-17 Women's Championship	Venezuela; Colombia; Paraguay
OFC (Oceania)	Appointed by OFC (qualifying tournament cancelled)	New Zealand
UEFA (Europe)	2014 UEFA Women's Under-17 Championship	Germany; Spain; Italy^{1}

1.Teams that made their debut.

== Venues ==
Four stadiums in four cities are to be used across Costa Rica.

Alajuela	Liberia	2014 FIFA U-17 Women's World Cup is located in Costa Rica
Estadio Alejandro Morera Soto	Estadio Edgardo Baltodano Briceño	2014 FIFA U-17 Women's World Cup is located in Costa Rica
Capacity: 16,625	Capacity: 4,300	2014 FIFA U-17 Women's World Cup is located in Costa Rica
San José	Tibás	2014 FIFA U-17 Women's World Cup is located in Costa Rica
Estadio Nacional de Costa Rica	Estadio Ricardo Saprissa Aymá	2014 FIFA U-17 Women's World Cup is located in Costa Rica
Capacity: 34,453	Capacity: 21,704	2014 FIFA U-17 Women's World Cup is located in Costa Rica

== Match officials ==
A total of 14 referees, 4 reserve referees, and 28 assistant referees were appointed by FIFA for the tournament.

Confederation	Referees	Assistant referees
AFC	(Japan) Fusako Kajiyama (Thailand) Pannipar Kamnueng (Singapore) Abirami Apbai Naidu (reserve)	(Japan) Emi Chiba (South Korea) Kim Kyoung-min (South Korea) Lee Seul-gi (Japan) Saori Takahashi
CAF	(Togo) Aissata Ameyo Amegee (Zambia) Gladys Lengwe (reserve)	(Togo) Ayawa Mana Dzodope (Madagascar) Lidwine Pelagie Rakotozafinoro
CONCACAF	(El Salvador) Miriam Patricia Leon Serpas (Jamaica) Cardella Samuels (Mexico) Lucila Venegas Montes (Costa Rica) Marianela Ayala Cruz (reserve)	(El Salvador) Emperatriz Ivonne Ayala Lopez (Jamaica) Princess Brown (Mexico) Enedina Caudillo Gomez (Mexico) Lixy Esperanza Enriquez Guerrero (Jamaica) Stacy-Ann Greyson (Costa Rica) Kimberly Moreira Rojas
CONMEBOL	(Brazil) Ana Karina Marques Valentin Alves (Peru) Silvia Elizabeth Reyes Juarez (Chile) Maria Belen Carvajal Peña (reserve)	(Uruguay) Luciana Elizabeth Mascaraña (Brazil) Katiuscia Mayer Berger Mendonça (Paraguay) Rossana Mabel Salinas Garcia (Paraguay) Nadia Maria Macarena Weiler Figueredo
OFC	(New Zealand) Anna-Marie Keighley	(Solomon Islands) Nagarita Jimmy (Tonga) Lata I Sia Kaumatule
UEFA	(Czech Republic) Jana Adámková (Hungary) Katalin Kulcsár (Sweden) Pernilla Larsson (Ukraine) Kateryna Monzul (Italy) Carina Vitulano	(Greece) Ourania Foskolou (Sweden) Helen Karo (Greece) Panagiota Koutsoumpou (Hungary) Judit Kulcsár (Cyprus) Angela Kyriakou (England) Sian Massey (Spain) Yolanda Parga Rodriguez (Czech Republic) Lucie Ratajová (Croatia) Sanja Rodak Karsic (Slovakia) Maria Sukenikova

== Squads ==
Each team must name a squad of 21 players (three of whom must be goalkeepers) by the FIFA deadline. The squads were announced on 6 March 2014.

== Final draw ==
The group stage draw was held on 17 December 2013 in Pueblo Antiguo. Confederation champions Germany, Japan and Mexico were put in Pot 1 alongside the hosts Costa Rica, who were automatically assigned to Position A1. The draw then made sure no teams of the same confederation could meet in the group stage.

Pot 1 (Seeded teams)	Pot 2 (CONCACAF & CONMEBOL)	Pot 3 (CAF & OFC)	Pot 4 (AFC & UEFA)
Costa Rica; Germany; Japan; Mexico	Canada; Colombia; Paraguay; Venezuela	Ghana; New Zealand; Nigeria; Zambia	China; Italy; North Korea; Spain

== Group stage ==
The winners and runners-up of each group advance to the quarter-finals. The rankings of teams in each group are determined as follows:

1. points obtained in all group matches;
2. goal difference in all group matches;
3. number of goals scored in all group matches;

If two or more teams are equal on the basis of the above three criteria, their rankings are determined as follows:

1. points obtained in the group matches between the teams concerned;
2. goal difference in the group matches between the teams concerned;
3. number of goals scored in the group matches between the teams concerned;
4. drawing of lots by the FIFA Organising Committee.

Key to colours in group tables
Group winners and runners-up advance to the Quarter-finals

All times are local, Central Standard Time (UTC−6).

=== Group A ===
Team	Pld	W	D	L	GF	GA	GD	Pts
Venezuela	3	3	0	0	8	0	+8	9
Italy	3	2	0	1	3	1	+2	6
Zambia	3	1	0	2	2	7	−5	3
Costa Rica	3	0	0	3	1	6	−5	0

15 March 2014
17:00

Italy	2–0	Zambia
Serturini 41', 53'	Report

Estadio Nacional de Costa Rica, San José
Attendance: 34,453
Referee: Lucila Venegas (Mexico)
15 March 2014
20:00

Costa Rica	0–3	Venezuela
	Report	Castellanos 49', 52'; Moreno 88'

Estadio Nacional de Costa Rica, San José
Attendance: 34,453
Referee: Pernilla Larsson (Sweden)

18 March 2014
17:00

Venezuela	4–0	Zambia
Castellanos 14'; G. García 47', 59', 86'	Report

Estadio Nacional de Costa Rica, San José
Attendance: 25,624
Referee: Jana Adámková (Czech Republic)
18 March 2014
20:00

Costa Rica	0–1	Italy
	Report	Marinelli 19'

Estadio Nacional de Costa Rica, San José
Attendance: 25,624
Referee: Silvia Reyes (Peru)

22 March 2014
20:00

Zambia	2–1	Costa Rica
G. Chanda 8'; Araya 69' (o.g.)	Report	Varela 3'

Estadio Ricardo Saprissa Aymá, Tibas
Attendance: 9,658
Referee: Anna–Marie Keighley (New Zealand)
22 March 2014
20:00

Venezuela	1–0	Italy
Castellanos 46'	Report

Estadio Alejandro Morera Soto, Alajuela
Attendance: 5,863
Referee: Cardella Samuels (Jamaica)

=== Group B ===
Team	Pld	W	D	L	GF	GA	GD	Pts
Ghana	3	2	0	1	4	2	+2	6
Canada	3	1	2	0	5	4	+1	5
North Korea	3	1	1	1	5	6	−1	4
Germany	3	0	1	2	5	7	−2	1

15 March 2014
17:00

Ghana	2–0	North Korea
Ayiyem 16'; Owusu-Ansah 50'	Report

Estadio Edgardo Baltodano Briceño, Liberia
Attendance: 2,910
Referee: Katalin Kulcsár (Hungary)
15 March 2014
20:00

Germany	2–2	Canada
Ehegötz 65'; Fellhauer 68'	Report	Fleming 3'; Levasseur 44'

Estadio Edgardo Baltodano Briceño, Liberia
Attendance: 2,910
Referee: Ana Marques (Brazil)

18 March 2014
17:00

Ghana	1–0	Germany
Amfobea 43'	Report

Estadio Edgardo Baltodano Briceño, Liberia
Attendance: 3,250
Referee: Pannipar Kamnueng (Thailand)
18 March 2014
20:00

North Korea	1–1	Canada
Sung Hyang-sim 54'	Report	Kim Jong-sim 86' (o.g.)

Estadio Edgardo Baltodano Briceño, Liberia
Attendance: 3,250
Referee: Carina Vitulano (Italy)

22 March 2014
17:00

Canada	2–1	Ghana
Levasseur 9', 40'	Report	Owusu-Ansah 72'

Estadio Ricardo Saprissa Aymá, Tibas
Attendance: 9,658
Referee: Kateryna Monzul (Ukraine)
22 March 2014
17:00

North Korea	4–3	Germany
Ju Hyo-sim 30'; Sung Hyang-sim 34'; Wi Jong-sim 41'; Ri Ji-hyang 61' (pen.)	Report	Ehegötz 5'; Sehan 12'; Walkling 24'

Estadio Alejandro Morera Soto, Alajuela
Attendance: 5,863
Referee: Lucila Venegas (Mexico)

=== Group C ===
Team	Pld	W	D	L	GF	GA	GD	Pts
Japan	3	3	0	0	15	0	+15	9
Spain	3	2	0	1	10	3	+7	6
New Zealand	3	0	1	2	1	7	−6	1
Paraguay	3	0	1	2	2	18	−16	1

16 March 2014
11:00

New Zealand	1–1	Paraguay
Cleverley 69'	Report	Barrios 84'

Estadio Ricardo Saprissa Aymá, Tibas
Attendance: 2,250
Referee: Pannipar Kamnueng (Thailand)
16 March 2014
14:00

Spain	0–2	Japan
	Report	Miyagawa 43'; Matsubara 51'

Estadio Ricardo Saprissa Aymá, Tibas
Attendance: 2,250
Referee: Cardella Samuels (Jamaica)

19 March 2014
17:00

New Zealand	0–3	Spain
	Report	Hernández 3'; P. Garrote 34'; N. García 67'

Estadio Ricardo Saprissa Aymá, Tibas
Attendance: 2,364
Referee: Aissata Amegee (Togo)
19 March 2014
20:00

Paraguay	0–10	Japan
	Report	Hasegawa 15'; Endo 22'; Miyagawa 36'; Ichise 47'; Hiratsuka 56'; Saihara 62'; Sugita 75', 85', 86'; Kono 90+2' (pen.)

Estadio Ricardo Saprissa Aymá, Tibas
Attendance: 2,364
Referee: Pernilla Larsson (Sweden)

23 March 2014
17:00

Japan	3–0	New Zealand
Hasegawa 20'; Kobayashi 71' (pen.); Matsubara 90+3'	Report

Estadio Nacional de Costa Rica, San José
Attendance: 5,100
Referee: Ana Marques (Brazil)
23 March 2014
17:00

Paraguay	1–7	Spain
Godoy 25'	Report	Beltrán 4'; Falcón 11', 17'; N. García 64', 83'; P. Garrote 76', 79'

Estadio Edgardo Baltodano Briceño, Liberia
Attendance: 3,199
Referee: Miriam Leon (El Salvador)

=== Group D ===
Team	Pld	W	D	L	GF	GA	GD	Pts
Nigeria	3	3	0	0	7	2	+5	9
Mexico	3	2	0	1	8	3	+5	6
China	3	1	0	2	4	7	−3	3
Colombia	3	0	0	3	2	9	−7	0

16 March 2014
14:00

Mexico	4–0	Colombia
Salazar 1'; Crowther 4'; J. González 14'; Huerta 71'	Report

Estadio Alejandro Morera Soto, Alajuela
Attendance: 4,300
Referee: Fusako Kajiyama (Japan)
16 March 2014
17:00

China	1–2	Nigeria
Fan Yuqiu 64'	Report	Ajibade 21'; Kanu 63'

Estadio Alejandro Morera Soto, Alajuela
Attendance: 4,300
Referee: Kateryna Monzul (Ukraine)

19 March 2014
17:00

Mexico	4–0	China
Bernal 30' (pen.); J. González 42'; Martínez 66'; Cruz 87'	Report

Estadio Alejandro Morera Soto, Alajuela
Attendance: 4,629
Referee: Anna–Marie Keighley (New Zealand)
19 March 2014
20:00

Colombia	1–2	Nigeria
Ang. Rodríguez 3'	Report	Bokiri 26'; Kanu 59'

Estadio Alejandro Morera Soto, Alajuela
Attendance: 4,629
Referee: Miriam Leon (El Salvador)

23 March 2014
20:00

Nigeria	3–0	Mexico
Ajibade 12'; Kanu 16'; Yakubu 58'	Report

Estadio Nacional de Costa Rica, San José
Attendance: 5,100
Referee: Silvia Reyes (Peru)
23 March 2014
20:00

Colombia	1–3	China
And. Rodríguez 60'	Report	Cui Yuhan 72'; Páez 75' (o.g.); Chen Yudan 90+1'

Estadio Edgardo Baltodano Briceño, Liberia
Attendance: 3,199
Referee: Katalin Kulcsár (Hungary)

== Knockout stage ==
In the knockout stages, if a match is level at the end of normal playing time, the match is determined by a penalty shoot-out (no extra time is played).

Quarter-finals
27 March — San José
Venezuela	3
Canada	2
27 March — Liberia
Japan	2
Mexico	0
27 March — San José
Ghana	2 (3)
Italy (p)	2 (4)
27 March — Liberia
Nigeria	0
Spain	3

Semi-finals
31 March — Liberia
Venezuela	1
Japan	4
31 March — Liberia
Italy	0
Spain	2

Final
4 April — San José
Japan	2
Spain	0
Third place
4 April — San José
Venezuela	4 (0)
Italy (p)	4 (2)

=== Quarter-finals ===
27 March 2014
14:00

Venezuela	3–2	Canada
Castellanos 6'; Zambrano 43'; G. García 62'	Report	Kinzner 19'; Levasseur 40'

Estadio Nacional de Costa Rica, San José
Attendance: 1,812
Referee: Jana Adámková (Czech Republic)

27 March 2014
17:00

Ghana	2–2	Italy
Ayiyem 4'; Abambila 90'	Report	Marinelli 8'; Giugliano 17' (pen.)
Penalties
Ayiyem (penalty scored); Kuzagbe (penalty missed); Opoku (penalty scored); Abambila (penalty missed); Amfobea (penalty scored)	3–4	(penalty missed) Boattin; (penalty scored) Giugliano; (penalty scored) Simonetti; (penalty scored) Serturini; (penalty scored) Vergani

Estadio Nacional de Costa Rica, San José
Attendance: 1,812
Referee: Fusako Kajiyama (Japan)

27 March 2014
17:00

Japan	2–0	Mexico
Hasegawa 12'; Sugita 43'	Report

Estadio Edgardo Baltodano Briceño, Liberia
Attendance: 3,406
Referee: Carina Vitulano (Italy)

27 March 2014
20:00

Nigeria	0–3	Spain
	Report	Guijarro 14' (pen.), 71'; N. García 58'

Estadio Edgardo Baltodano Briceño, Liberia
Attendance: 3,406
Referee: Anna–Marie Keighley (New Zealand)

=== Semi-finals ===
31 March 2014
17:00

Venezuela	1–4	Japan
Castellanos 90+2'	Report	Nagano 13'; Ichise 33'; Kobayashi 52'; Sugita 63' (pen.)

Estadio Edgardo Baltodano Briceño, Liberia
Attendance: 3,528
Referee: Pernilla Larsson (Sweden)

31 March 2014
20:00

Italy	0–2	Spain
	Report	Hernández 48' (pen.); N. García 81' (pen.)

Estadio Edgardo Baltodano Briceño, Liberia
Attendance: 3,528
Referee: Jana Adámková (Czech Republic)

=== Third place match ===
4 April 2014
14:00

Venezuela	4–4	Italy
Marcano 45+2'; G. García 60', 68'; Luzardo 90+5'	Report	Bergamaschi 16'; Giugliano 55', 61'; Simonetti 79'
Penalties
Moreno (penalty missed); Romero (penalty missed); D. Rodríguez (penalty missed); Goyo (penalty missed)	0–2	(penalty scored) Boattin; (penalty missed) Giugliano; (penalty scored) Simonetti

Estadio Nacional de Costa Rica, San José
Attendance: 29,814
Referee: Pannipar Kamnueng (Thailand)

=== Final ===
4 April 2014
17:00

Japan	2–0	Spain
Nishida 5'; Kono 78'	Report

Estadio Nacional de Costa Rica, San José
Attendance: 29,814
Referee: Lucila Venegas (Mexico)

== Winners ==
2014 FIFA U-17 Women's World Cup winners

Japan
First title

== Awards ==
The following awards were given for the tournament:

Golden Ball	Silver Ball	Bronze Ball
(Japan) Hina Sugita	(Japan) Yui Hasegawa	(Spain) Pilar Garrote

Golden Shoe	Silver Shoe	Bronze Shoe
(Venezuela) Deyna Castellanos (Venezuela) Gabriela García	—	(Japan) Hina Sugita

FIFA Fair Play Award	Golden Glove
Japan	(Japan) Mamiko Matsumoto

== Goalscorers ==
6 goals

- (Venezuela) Deyna Castellanos
- (Venezuela) Gabriela García

5 goals

- (Japan) Hina Sugita
- (Spain) Nahikari García

4 goals

- (Canada) Marie Levasseur

3 goals

- (Italy) Manuela Giugliano
- (Japan) Yui Hasegawa
- (Nigeria) Uchenna Kanu
- (Spain) Pilar Garrote

2 goals

- (Germany) Nina Ehegötz
- (Ghana) Jane Ayiyem
- (Ghana) Sandra Owusu-Ansah
- (Italy) Gloria Marinelli
- (Italy) Annamaria Serturini
- (Japan) Nana Ichise
- (Japan) Rikako Kobayashi
- (Japan) Fuka Kono
- (Japan) Shiho Matsubara
- (Japan) Asato Miyagawa
- (Mexico) Janae González
- (Nigeria) Rasheedat Ajibade
- (North Korea) Sung Hyang-sim
- (Spain) Andrea Falcón
- (Spain) Patricia Guijarro
- (Spain) Sandra Hernández

1 goal

- (Canada) Jessie Fleming
- (Canada) Sarah Kinzner
- (China) Chen Yudan
- (China) Cui Yuhan
- (China) Fan Yuqiu
- (Colombia) Andrea Rodríguez
- (Colombia) Angie Rodríguez
- (Costa Rica) Sofía Varela
- (Germany) Kim Fellhauer
- (Germany) Jasmin Sehan
- (Germany) Ricarda Walkling
- (Ghana) Ernestina Abambila
- (Ghana) Gladys Amfobea
- (Italy) Valentina Bergamaschi
- (Italy) Flaminia Simonetti
- (Japan) Yu Endo
- (Japan) Maki Hiratsuka
- (Japan) Fuka Nagano
- (Japan) Meika Nishida
- (Japan) Mizuki Saihara
- (Mexico) Rebeca Bernal
- (Mexico) Jacqueline Crowther
- (Mexico) Belén Cruz
- (Mexico) Cinthia Huerta
- (Mexico) Gabriela Martínez
- (Mexico) Viridiana Salazar
- (New Zealand) Daisy Cleverley
- (Nigeria) Joy Bokiri
- (Nigeria) Aminat Yakubu
- (North Korea) Ju Hyo-sim
- (North Korea) Ri Ji-hyang
- (North Korea) Wi Jong-sim
- (Paraguay) Sheryl Barrios
- (Paraguay) Fanny Godoy
- (Spain) Beatriz Beltrán
- (Venezuela) Sandra Luzardo
- (Venezuela) Tahicelis Marcano
- (Venezuela) Kika Moreno
- (Venezuela) Yosneidy Zambrano
- (Zambia) Grace Chanda

Own goal

- (Colombia) Sara Páez (for China PR)
- (Costa Rica) Maria Araya (for Zambia)
- (North Korea) Kim Jong-sim (for Canada)
