= Estadio Edgardo Baltodano Briceño =

Football stadium in Liberia, Costa Rica

Coordinates: 10°38′9″N 85°26′0″W

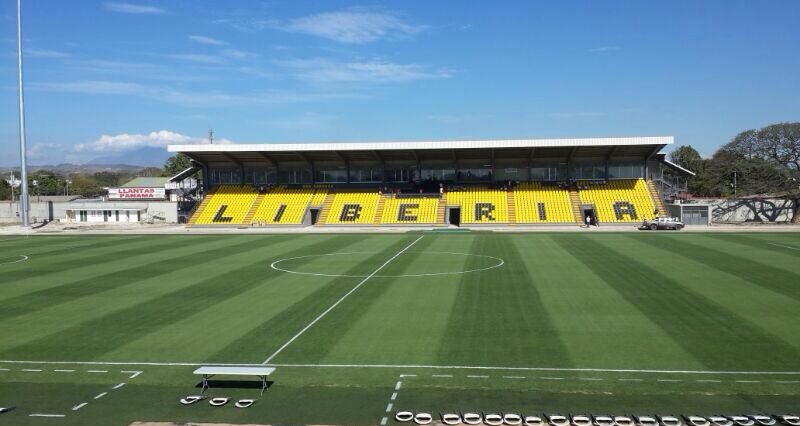
- Interactive map of Estadio Edgardo Baltodano Briceño
- Location: Liberia, Costa Rica
- Capacity: 5,979
- Surface: grass

Construction
- Opened: 24 July 1977

Tenant
- Municipal Liberia

Estadio Edgardo Baltodano Briceño is a multi-use stadium in Liberia, Costa Rica. It is currently used mostly for football matches and is the home stadium of Municipal Liberia. The stadium holds 5,979 people and was built in 1970.
In 1992, the lighting towers were purchased from Deportivo Saprissa.

It has been remodelled to host 2014 FIFA U-17 Women's World Cup matches.
