= Pernilla Larsson =

Swedish football referee (born 1976)

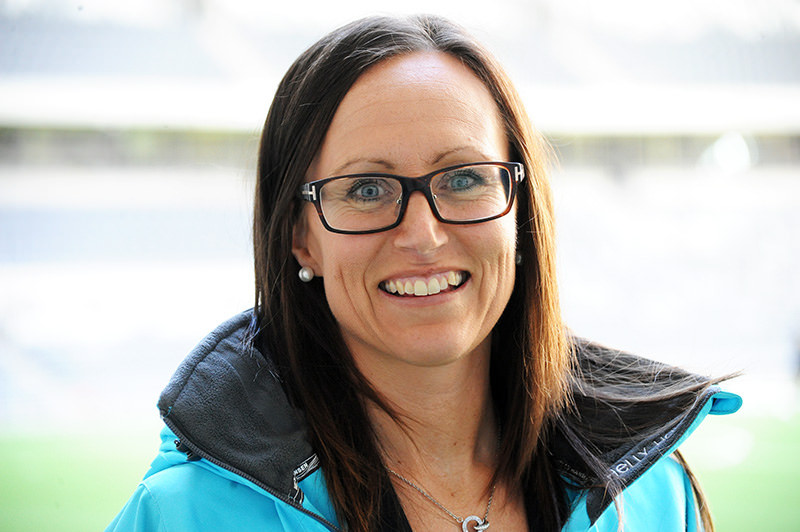
- Full name: Inga-Lill Pernilla Larsson
- Born: 18 September 1976 (age 50); Trollhättan, Sweden
- Other occupation: Dietitian

Domestic
Years	League	Role
2001–	Damallsvenskan	Referee

International
Years	League	Role
2010–	FIFA listed	Referee

Pernilla Larsson (born 18 September 1976) is a Swedish football referee. She is 165 cm (5 ft 5 in) tall and has been on the FIFA International Referees List since 2010. She was selected by FIFA for the 2015 FIFA Women's World Cup.

In 2014, she was voted ninth in the International Federation of Football History & Statistics (IFFHS) World's Best Woman Referee poll, behind winner Bibiana Steinhaus. Larsson was named Swedish female Referee of the Year at Fotbollsgalan in 2014. The same year, she served as a referee at the 2014 FIFA U-17 Women's World Cup.
