= Best of Soundtrack (emU) =

BEST OF SOUNDTRACK [emU]

Compilation album by Hiroyuki Sawano
- Released: September 9, 2015
- Genre: Soundtrack
- Length: 2h:36min:54seg (Standard); 3h:06min:00seg (Limited edition)
- Label: SME Records
- Producers: Hiroyuki Sawano; Yasuchi Horiguchi (co.&exec); Daisuke Katsurada (exec)

Hiroyuki Sawano chronology
BEST OF VOCAL WORKS [nZk] (2015)	''BEST OF SOUNDTRACK [emU]'' (2015)

BEST OF SOUNDTRACK [emU] is the second best-of album by Japanese composer Hiroyuki Sawano, released on September 9, 2015 on SME Records. It was released in two versions: The Standard edition, which included two CD's with some of his most-known works from anime and TV drama series, and the limited edition, which included an extra disc with re-arrangements of his songs.

It was released on the same day as o1, his first album as SawanoHiroyuki[nZk].

== Track listing ==
All music is composed by Hiroyuki Sawano.

DISC 1
No.	Title	Lyrics	Vocals	Length
1.	"BLUE DRAGON" ('07 Ver.)			4:55
2.	"81DIVER"			3:12
3.	"LiVE/EViL"			3:45
4.	"from sunset to sunrise"			5:43
5.	"MARKS"	Rie	Yasuo Suzuki; Yuko Kawai; Kaori Nishina; Hiroaki Takeuchi; Hikaru; Hajime; Sen; Melo-J; Yumiko Inoue	4:03
6.	"80$$"			3:58
7.	"PRISONER"			3:37
8.	"Climb to the Top"			3:05
9.	"Tang"			3:23
10.	"α≠a"	Rie	Mika Kobayashi	4:15
11.	"Back to the Starting Point"			4:23
12.	"BLOOD oF thE DRAGON"			3:18
13.	"musica"			4:08
14.	"motherhood ~me & my mom~" (vocal ver.)	Makiko Imai	Aika Sekiyama	5:24
15.	"tragedy"			4:20
16.	"Grey to Blue"	Benjamin; mpi	Mika Kobayashi	4:13
17.	"FUNKY PUNKY MONKEY"			4:18
18.	"HONEST"			4:40
19.	"DRAGON RISES"			3:33
Total length:				78:13

All music is composed by Hiroyuki Sawano.

DISC 2
No.	Title	Lyrics	Vocals	Length
1.	"MAIN THEME"			3:53
2.	"BLAZE [ZERO-TWO Ver.]"			3:43
3.	"ətˈæk 0N tάɪtn" (attack ON titan)	Rie	Mika Kobayashi	4:18
4.	"fiore"	Hiroyuki Sawano	Cyua	4:30
5.	"U & Cloud"			3:43
6.	"Ω" (Omega)			4:33
7.	"ON YOUR MARK"			4:10
8.	"Perfect Time"	mpi	Mika Kobayashi; mpi	4:44
9.	"i-AM"			5:36
10.	"KiryuG@kiLL" (鬼龍G@キLL)			4:39
11.	"Big Break"			3:26
12.	"zai"		Cyua	4:44
13.	"This is a Fight to Change the World"	Rie	Mika Kobayashi	3:35
14.	"1st-Mov.:S"			5:07
15.	"BLUE"			3:56
16.	"BRE@TH//LESS"	cAnON.	Mika Kobayashi	4:03
17.	"UNICORN"			4:46
18.	"Missing Piece"	mpi	mpi	5:15
Total length:				78:41

All music is composed by Hiroyuki Sawano.

DISC 3 - Limited Edition only
No.	Title	Lyrics	Vocals	Length
1.	"Aesthetic" ([emU] ver.)	Makiko Imai	Jannine Weigel	3:54
2.	"PF-[emU] 1"			9:08
3.	"PF-[emU] 2"			9:13
4.	"3594εMT"			2:46
5.	"ThreeFiveNineFourε"	Rie	Mika Kobayashi	4:05
Total length:				29:06

== Personnel ==
Adapted from Booklet

- Hiroyuki Sawano – composer, arranger, producer
- Yasushi Horiguchi – co-producer, executive producer, director
- Daisuke Katsurada – executive producer
- Mitsunori Aizawa - recording engineer, mixing engineer
- Yoshio Ohira – recording engineer, mixing engineer
- Junichiro "ojjy" Ojima – recording engineer, mixing engineer
- Yoichiro Kano – recording engineer, mixing engineer
- Eiichi Nishizaawa – recording engineer, mixing engineer
- Yuji Chinone – mastering engineer
- Shoji Kobayashi – score copy
- Akiko Shimodoi – management staff
- Hajime Sakai – management staff
- Giottographica – art direction & design
- Michito Goto – photographer
- Aya Murakami – hair & make-up
- Tatsuhiko Marumoto – styling
- Yuko Mori – products coordination
- Toru Takeuchi – a&r
- Takeshi Tomaru – a&r
- Harumi Okuma – a&r assistant
- SME Records Promotion Room – media promotion
- Yu Tsuzuki – sales promotion
- Mitsuki Hirabayashi – digital promotion
- Fumiko Yano – business affairs
- Keiichi Tonomura – supervise
