= Phantom Agents =

- Official Japanese DVD cover (2010 version) of Ninja Butai Gekko.
- Genre: Spy drama; Action-adventure
- Created by: Tatsuo Yoshida
- Starring: Joh Mizuki
- Narrated by: Toru Ohira
- Composer: Chumei Watanabe
- Country of origin: Japan
- No. of episodes: 130

Original release
- Network: Fuji Television
- Release: January 3, 1964 – October 2, 1966

Phantom Agents (忍者部隊月光, Ninja butai gekkō) is a Japanese action/spy drama television series of 130 black and white episodes that aired from 3 January 1964 to 2 October 1966. The series was created by Tatsuo Yoshida and based on the manga Boy Ninja Squad Moonlight (少年忍者部隊月光, Shonen Ninja Butai Gekkō), which was published/serialized by Shonen Gahosha's Weekly Shonen King from 1963 to 1965.

== Synopsis ==
The Phantom Agents were modern day ninja working for the Japanese government, mostly against the dastardly "Black Flag" organization. They wore "pudding basin" motorcycle helmets, and in the earlier episodes they ran everywhere in single file, but later graduated to a Toyota Crown Saloon.

The Phantom Agents were armed with ninja weapons such as shuriken and used guns "only as a last resort," as was patiently explained to the only female member in the title sequence of each episode. They had the ability to jump backwards up onto the limbs of trees and could hold a piece of cloth with a brick pattern on it in front of them and thus blend into the wall behind them, becoming invisible to their opponents.

The series starred Joh Mizuki as Phantar, the leader of the Phantom Agents. Other agents included Tugor, Cordo, Zemo and a female agent, Margo (later replaced by Gina). There was also a small boy agent, Tomba. Other agents that joined later in the series were Andar (who seemed to replace Tugor) and Mundo, who could roll himself up into a bowling ball to knock over the villains. Tugor was killed by a bomb in one of the episodes, leaving behind only a boot that many fans remember as a sad moment in the series. Another agent, Gino, was killed in the first episode.

The three main criminal organisations the Phantom Agents fought against each had a distinctive character:

- The Black Flags of Smigzee included black-clad ninja and also uniformed guards at their island base. (Smigzee means Secret Military Intelligence Group Zee according to an explanation given in the Phantom Agents episode Operation Red Ghost.)
- The Mocula looked much like Yakuza or Mafia hoods, but with added ninja abilities.
- The Ghost Group, who were the main adversary in later episodes, had a mysterious magical aspect and included magicians with highly specialised skills.

== Impact beyond Japan ==
Phantom Agents first screened in Australia on the Seven Network on 31 January 1966. The series, shown mainly in Sydney, enjoyed considerable popularity among Australian children following on from the huge success of The Samurai, the first Japanese TV series ever shown in Australia, which became a major ratings success there during 1965. A teen rock band in Melbourne has named themselves The Phantom Agents.

The show was aired in the US, but not to any regular schedule, mostly being relegated to "filler" status between sporting events. A "Captain Jack McCarthy" character was used to provide some sort of continuity between the erratic showings of episodes, although fans of the show have commented that they suspect that he never actually watched an episode. It was not a ratings success there, at least partly due to the sporadic programming schedule, and the fact that it was often broadcast at times inconvenient for schoolchildren to watch. A Spanish-dubbed version was also shown in some South American countries and Agentes Fantasmas was shown in Portuguese-speaking Brazil.

== Development ==
The changes made from the manga to the drama involve the protagonist being adults instead of teenagers.

== Media ==
=== Home Media ===
The series was released in Japan in 2000 via VHS tapes and in 2001 via DVD box sets.

== Remake ==
There was supposed to be a remake version that was supposed to be set in the 1970s, but it never took off.

== Bibliography ==
- 石橋春海『'60年代 蘇る昭和特撮ヒーロー』コスミック出版〈COSMIC MOOK〉、2013年12月5日。ISBN 978-4-7747-5853-4。
