= Boku Girl =

2013 manga series by Akira Sugito

- Volume 1 cover, featuring Mizuki

ボクガール (Boku Gāru)
- Genre: Romantic comedy
- Manga
- Written by: Akira Sugito
- Published by: Shueisha
- Magazine: Weekly Young Jump
- Original run: December 12, 2013 – May 12, 2016
- Volumes: 11
- Light novel

Boku Girl: Boku no Arbeit
- Written by: Tama
- Illustrated by: Akira Sugito
- Published by: Shueisha
- Imprint: Jump J-Books
- Published: September 18, 2015

Boku Girl (Japanese: ボクガール, Hepburn: Boku Gāru; lit. "I Am a Girl") is a Japanese ecchi romantic comedy manga series by Akira Sugito. It was originally serialized by Shueisha in their magazine Weekly Young Jump from December 12, 2013, to May 12, 2016, and has since been collected in eleven tankōbon volumes. A light novel spin-off, Boku Girl: Boku no Arbeit, (Note: Japanese: Boku Girl: Boku no Arbeit (ボクガール ボクのアルバイト, Boku Gāru: Boku no Arubaito; "I am a Girl: My Part-Time Job")) was released in 2015.

The story follows Mizuki Suzushiro, who initially is depicted as a young, feminine man. Selected by the bored god Loki as a target for a magical prank, Mizuki wakes up one morning with breasts and a vagina; the transformation becomes a catalyst for self-discovery and for an exploration of Mizuki's sexuality. While adapting to the change, Mizuki is supported by Takeru Ichimonji, a childhood friend, and Yumeko Fujiwara, a classmate Mizuki has a crush on.

The series was well received for its comedy and romance, its art and character design, and its use of transgender themes. It performed well commercially across gender demographics, with many copies bought by women. Its commercial success was in part attributed to its story and art, and in part to the popularity of feminization and homosexuality as themes in manga.

== Synopsis ==
Boku Girl is a transgender-themed ecchi romantic comedy, and follows Mizuki Suzushiro, who in the beginning of the series is depicted as a male high school student with a feminine beauty, which often causes Mizuki to be seen as a woman and get flirted with by men, and an insecurity over a lack of masculinity. When the bored Norse trickster god Loki decides to play a prank on humans, she picks Mizuki as her target, and the next morning Mizuki is shocked to wake up with breasts and a vagina. Although Mizuki initially is opposed to the transformation, it serves as a catalyst for self-discovery and exploration of sexuality, and for development and confirmation of Mizuki's hidden femininity, while Mizuki adapts to living as a woman and gradually begins to like it.

=== Characters ===
- Mizuki Suzushiro (鈴白 瑞樹, Suzushiro Mizuki) is the series' main character, a feminine high school student with an insecurity over a lack of masculinity, whose father always stressed the importance of acting like a man. Mizuki has been friends with Takeru since childhood and has a crush on Yumeko.
- Takeru Ichimonji (一文字 猛, Ichimonji Takeru) is Mizuki's childhood friend, who offers support. After the transformation, Takeru finds himself attracted to Mizuki.
- Yumeko Fujiwara (藤原 夢子, Fujiwara Yumeko) is one of Mizuki's classmates and has a crush on Takeru.
- Loki (ロキ, Roki) is a trickster god from Norse mythology, who in her boredom likes to subject humans to magical pranks.

== Production and release ==
Boku Girl was written and illustrated by Akira Sugito, and was originally serialized by Shueisha in their magazine Weekly Young Jump, from the 2014/2 issue on December 12, 2013 to the 2016/24 issue on May 12, 2016. Shueisha has since collected the series in eleven tankōbon volumes, published under the Young Jump Comics imprint. The volumes were also published digitally through Shueisha's mobile app Yanjan. In addition to the original manga, Boku Girl merchandise has been released: A dakimakura pillow featuring Mizuki was produced in 2015, and a Mizuki bishōjo figurine in 2016. A light novel spin-off written by Tama and illustrated by Sugito, Boku Girl: Boku no Arbeit, was published by Shueisha on September 18, 2015. A Chinese edition of the manga is published by the Chingwin Publishing Group.

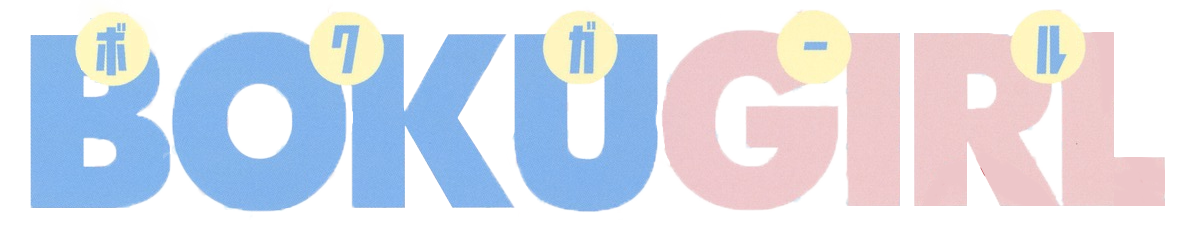
Starting with volume 6, the series' logo and covers were redesigned.

The cover artworks for the tankōbon volumes were designed and illustrated by Sugito in collaboration with the Weekly Young Jump editorial department, and use pop design along with illustrations of Mizuki. After going through many design iterations and color variations, the series' cover and logo design were changed starting with volume 6.

=== Volumes ===
No.	Release date	ISBN
1	May 19, 2014	978-4-08-879840-0
Mizuki is insecure over a lack of masculinity – especially due to frequently getting read as a woman and flirted with by men, and after Mizuki's crush Yumeko says she sees Mizuki as a female friend – but is chosen by the bored trickster god Loki as the target for a magical prank, and wakes up one morning with breasts and a vagina. Takeru, a childhood friend, offers support as Mizuki learns to deal with the anatomical changes, and helps keep them a secret. As Mizuki cannot use the men's shared bath in the dormitory without risking revealing the changes, Takeru takes Mizuki to a public bath house; wanting Mizuki to avoid drawing attention when entering the women's bath, they stop by a clothing store to buy women's clothes. As Mizuki steps out of the fitting room in a dress, deeply embarrassed, Yumeko spots them and walks up to them, wondering why Mizuki is wearing women's clothes and if they are on a date.
2	June 19, 2014	978-4-08-879841-7
3	September 19, 2014	978-4-08-890011-7
4	December 19, 2014	978-4-08-890078-0
5	March 19, 2015	978-4-08-890129-9
6	June 19, 2015	978-4-08-890206-7
7	September 18, 2015	978-4-08-890251-7
8	December 18, 2015	978-4-08-890327-9
9	March 18, 2016	978-4-08-890374-3
10	June 17, 2016	978-4-08-890456-6
11	July 19, 2016	978-4-08-890470-2

== Reception ==
Boku Girl was well received by critics. Honey's Anime liked the series, calling it amusing and saying that its "spicy" scenarios made it "almost impossible to get bored" with it. They described it as similar in rhythm and plot development to Akane Ogura's Kanojo ni Naru Hi (2013) and Kanojo ni Naru Hi: Another (2013), recommending fans of either to try the other. They similarly compared it to Tetsuya Hayashi's Mida Love (2016), calling both enjoyable stories about gender not mattering to love. Reviewing Boku Girl up until volume 3, Kono Manga ga Sugoi! praised it for its transgender themes and were excited about it contributing to a wave of transgender manga after series themed around that had long had a hard time finding mainstream success, and hoped that it would become a long-running series. IT Media recommended the series for people who want to try transgender manga, calling it full of charm, with cute portrayals of the protagonist considering the difference between living as a man and as a woman. They praised the series' artwork as cute and appealing, and found both its comedic and romantic elements strong.

Boku Girl also performed well commercially, with three volumes debuting on the weekly Japanese top ten manga sales charts. In 2014, Japanese book retailer Hōrindō Takadanobaba called it one of the more popular manga at the time, with volume 1 selling out on release day; they attributed this in part to the art, story, and cute character design, but also to its theme of feminization, which they described as very popular, with feminization works such as Aya Higuchi's Hatsujo Loop (2014) selling very well. The series was popular among readers regardless of gender, and many tankōbon copies were bought by women. In a feature on the topic, Kono Manga ga Sugoi! noted that Boku Girl seemed to also be part of a trend of manga with gay or gay-adjacent themes being popular.

== Official website ==
- Official website (in Japanese)
