= Mizuki Nishiyama =

Contemporary artist

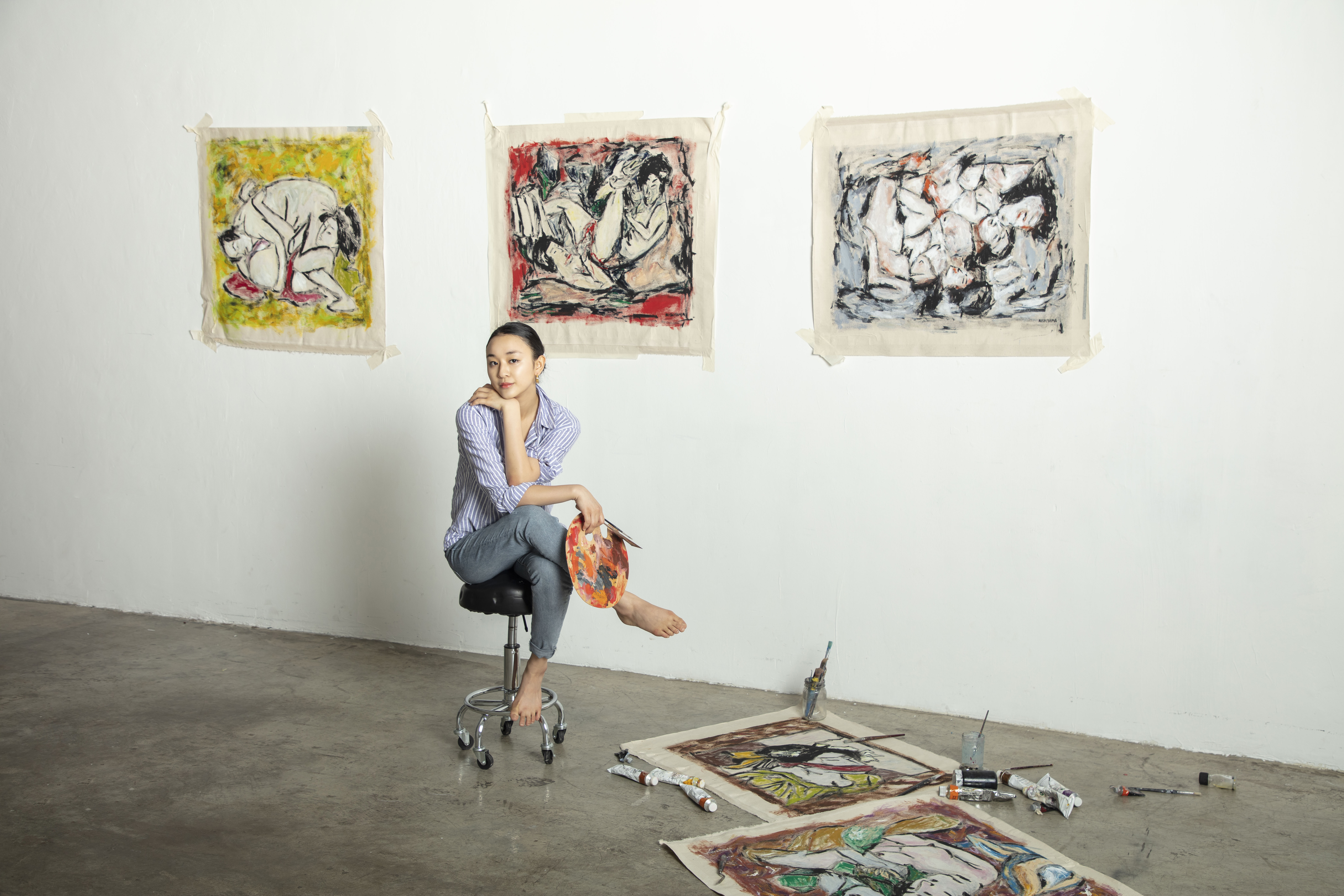
- Born: 1998 (age 27–28); Hong Kong
- Education: Parsons School of Design Central Saint Martins
- Occupation: Artist

Mizuki Nishiyama (Japanese: 西山瑞貴, Hepburn: Nishiyama Mizuki; born 1998) is a mixed Japanese artist based in New York City and London.

She is known for her abstracted figurative paintings that explore human fragility, vulnerability, intimacy, and her mixed heritages of Japan, Hong Kong, and Italy. She speaks 6 languages, and had solo exhibited 8 international shows, and more than 15 international group shows by 22 years old.

== Early life and education ==
Nishiyama graduated from Parsons School of Design with a Bachelors of Fine Arts, and Central Saint Martins with a Masters of Fine Arts degree. She also attended Canadian International School of Hong Kong.

== Solo exhibitions ==
2022 - The Beautiful and The Grotesque, Haus of Contemporary, Hong Kong

2022 - Seiza: Transgressing the Seated Body, Art Next, Hong Kong

2021 - Moroi, Shout Gallery, Hong Kong

2021 - Ikebana, International Finance Centre, Hong Kong

2021 - Mizuki Nishiyama, Mr Wolf, Hong Kong

2020 - Shunga, Operation Smile Charity Exhibition, Whitestone Gallery, Hong Kong

2020 - An Exploration of Human Fragility : Love and Lust, Tenri Cultural Institute of New York, New York, NY

2019 - Mizuki Nishiyama: 脆い: An Exploration of Human Fragility, The Greenpoint Gallery, New York, NY

2018 - Mizuki Nishiyama, Rabbit House, New York, NY
