= Joh Mizuki =

Japanese actor

Joh Mizuki (水木 襄, Mizuki Jō, 11 March 1938 – 1991) was a Japanese actor. His birth name was Ishikawa Yoshiaki. He was born in Tokyo.

Mizuki made his acting debut in 1958, in Futeki naru hanko which was directed by Makino Masahiro. He played a number of juvenile delinquent-type roles in TV series in the late fifties and early sixties.

In 1964, he appeared in the internationally released Fuji TV action television series Ninja butai gekkô, known as Phantom Agents in the English language release. Joh Mizuki played the lead role of Phantar, who was the leader of a band of ninja-skilled government agents. Phantom Agents was shown in Australia, Venezuela, Brazil and other countries, including a limited airing in America in the New York area.
