= Mizuki Sonoda =

Japanese association football player

Personal information
- Date of birth: 21 November 1996 (age 29)
- Place of birth: Kyoto Prefecture, Japan
- Height: 1.64 m (5 ft 5 in)
- Position: Midfielder

Team information
- Current team: Albirex Niigata Ladies
- Number: 7

Senior career*
Years	Team	Apps	(Gls)
2021–	Albirex Niigata Ladies		
- * Club domestic league appearances and goals

Mizuki Sonoda (born 21 November 1996) is a Japanese professional footballer who plays as a midfielder for WE League club Albirex Niigata Ladies.

== Club career ==
Sonoda made her WE League debut on 12 September 2021.
