= Shiho Tomari =

Japanese footballer

Shiho Tomari 泊 志穂
Personal information
- Full name: Shiho Tomari
- Date of birth: March 26, 1990 (age 36)
- Place of birth: Nagoya, Aichi, Japan
- Height: 1.53 m (5 ft 0 in)
- Position: Forward

Team information
- Current team: AC Nagano Parceiro
- Number: 14

Youth career
- 2008–2011: Osaka University of Health and Sport Sciences

Senior career*
Years	Team	Apps	(Gls)
2012–2014	Urawa Reds	3	(0)
2015–2017	AC Nagano Parceiro	61	(19)
2018–?	Wacker Innsbruck		
2021-	AC Nagano Parceiro	0	(0)
Total		64	(19)

International career
2017	Japan	2	(0)
Medal record
Urawa Reds
Winner	Nadeshiko League	2014
Runner-up	Empress's Cup	2014
- * Club domestic league appearances and goals as of December 31, 2017

Shiho Tomari (泊 志穂, Tomari Shiho; born March 26, 1990) is a Japanese footballer who plays as a forward. She plays for AC Nagano Parceiro in the WE League. She has also played for the Japan national team.

== Club career ==
Tomari was born in Nagoya on March 26, 1990. After graduating from Osaka University of Health and Sport Sciences, she joined Urawa Reds in 2012. In 2015, she moved to AC Nagano Parceiro. In 2018, she moved to Austrian Frauenliga club Wacker Innsbruck.

== National team career ==
On July 27, 2017, Tomari debuted for Japan national team against Brazil. She played 2 games for Japan in 2017.

== National team statistics ==
Japan national team
Year	Apps	Goals
2017	2	0
Total	2	0
