= Kaede Nakamura =

Japanese footballer (born 1991)

Kaede Nakamura 中村 楓
Personal information
- Full name: Kaede Nakamura
- Date of birth: August 3, 1991 (age 35)
- Place of birth: Iwate, Japan
- Height: 1.65 m (5 ft 5 in)
- Position: Defender

Team information
- Current team: Sanfrecce Hiroshima Regina
- Number: 4

Youth career
- 2007–2009: Tokiwagi Gakuen High School LSC

Senior career*
Years	Team	Apps	(Gls)
2010–2020	Albirex Niigata	109	(1)
2021–	Sanfrecce Hiroshima Regina	0	(0)
Total		109	(1)

International career
2017	Japan	3	(0)
Medal record
Albirex Niigata
Runner-up	Empress's Cup	2011
Runner-up	Empress's Cup	2013
Runner-up	Empress's Cup	2015
Runner-up	Empress's Cup	2016
- * Club domestic league appearances and goals as of December 31, 2018

Kaede Nakamura (中村 楓, Nakamura Kaede; born August 3, 1991) is a Japanese footballer who plays as a defender. She plays for Sanfrecce Hiroshima Regina. She has played for the Japan national team.

== Club career ==
Nakamura was born in Iwate Prefecture on August 3, 1991. After graduating from high school, she joined Albirex Niigata in 2010.

== National team career ==
In 2017, Nakamura was selected Japan national team for 2017 Algarve Cup. At this competition, on March 3, she debuted against Iceland. She played 3 games for Japan in 2017.

== National team statistics ==
Japan national team
Year	Apps	Goals
2017	3	0
Total	3	0
