= Riho Sakamoto =

Japanese footballer

Riho Sakamoto 坂本 理保
Personal information
- Full name: Riho Sakamoto
- Date of birth: July 7, 1992 (age 34)
- Place of birth: Tochigi, Japan
- Height: 1.65 m (5 ft 5 in)
- Position: Midfielder

Team information
- Current team: AC Nagano Parceiro
- Number: 7

Youth career
- 2008–2010: Tokiwagi Gakuen High School LSC

Senior career*
Years	Team	Apps	(Gls)
2011–2014	Urawa Reds	29	(0)
2015–	AC Nagano Parceiro	69	(8)
Total		98	(8)

International career
2012	Japan U-20	1	(0)
2017	Japan	1	(0)
Medal record
Urawa Reds
Winner	Nadeshiko League	2014
Runner-up	Empress's Cup	2014
Representing Japan
FIFA U-20 Women's World Cup
Bronze medal – third place	2012 Japan
AFC U-19 Women's Championship
Gold medal – first place	2011 Vietnam
- * Club domestic league appearances and goals as of December 31, 2018

Riho Sakamoto (坂本 理保, Sakamoto Riho; born July 7, 1992) is a Japanese footballer who plays as a forward. She plays for AC Nagano Parceiro. She has also played for the Japan national team.

== Club career ==
Sakamoto was born in Tochigi Prefecture on July 7, 1992. After graduating from high school, she joined Urawa Reds in 2011. She moved to AC Nagano Parceiro in 2015.

== National team career ==
In 2012, Sakamoto was selected Japan U-20 national team for 2012 U-20 World Cup. Japan won 3rd place. On July 30, 2017, she debuted for Japan national team against Australia.

== National team statistics ==
Japan national team
Year	Apps	Goals
2017	1	0
Total	1	0
