= Mizuki Saihara =

Japanese footballer

Personal information
- Date of birth: 2 December 1997 (age 28)
- Place of birth: Hiroshima Prefecture, Japan
- Height: 1.71 m (5 ft 7 in)
- Position: Midfielder

Team information
- Current team: Sanfrecce Hiroshima Regina
- Number: 19

Senior career*
Years	Team	Apps	(Gls)
- Sanfrecce Hiroshima Regina
- * Club domestic league appearances and goals

Mizuki Saihara (born 2 December 1997) is a Japanese professional footballer who plays as a midfielder for WE League club Sanfrecce Hiroshima Regina.

== Club career ==
Saihara made her WE League debut on 16 October 2021.
