= Ayumi Oya =

Japanese footballer

Ayumi Oya 大矢 歩
Personal information
- Full name: Ayumi Oya
- Date of birth: November 8, 1994 (age 32)
- Place of birth: Midori, Gunma, Japan
- Height: 1.60 m (5 ft 3 in)
- Position: Forward

Team information
- Current team: Ehime FC
- Number: 9

Senior career*
Years	Team	Apps	(Gls)
2011–	Ehime FC	76	(20)
Total		76	(20)

International career
2017–2018	Japan	9	(0)
- * Club domestic league appearances and goals as of December 31, 2017

Ayumi Oya (大矢 歩, Oya Ayumi; born November 8, 1994) is a Japanese footballer who plays as a forward. She plays for Ehime FC and the Japan national team.

== Club career ==
Oya was born in Midori on November 8, 1994. She joined Ehime FC in 2011.

== National team career ==
On April 9, 2017, Oya debuted for Japan national team against Costa Rica. She played 9 games for Japan until 2018.

== National team statistics ==
Japan national team
Year	Apps	Goals
2017	8	0
2018	1	0
Total	9	0
