= Nana Ichise =

Japanese footballer (born 1997)

Nana Ichise 市瀬 菜々
Personal information
- Full name: Nana Ichise
- Date of birth: August 4, 1997 (age 29)
- Place of birth: Tokushima, Tokushima, Japan
- Height: 1.60 m (5 ft 3 in)
- Position: Defender

Youth career
- 2013–2015: Tokiwagi Gakuen High School LSC

Senior career*
| Years | Team | Apps | (Gls) |
| 2016–2023 | Mynavi Sendai | 97 | (3) |
| Total | | 97 | (3) |

International career
| 2014 | Japan U-17 | 6 | (2) |
| 2016 | Japan U-20 | 6 | (0) |
| 2017–2019 | Japan | 19 | (0) |
Medal record
Representing Japan
AFC Women's Asian Cup
| Gold medal – first place | 2018 Jordan |
FIFA U-20 Women's World Cup
| Bronze medal – third place | 2016 Papua New Guinea |
AFC U-19 Women's Championship
| Gold medal – first place | 2015 China |
FIFA U-17 Women's World Cup
| Gold medal – first place | 2014 Costa Rica |
AFC U-16 Women's Championship
| Gold medal – first place | 2013 China |
- * Club domestic league appearances and goals as of June 18, 2023

Nana Ichise (市瀬 菜々, Ichise Nana; born August 4, 1997) is a Japanese former professional footballer who plays as a defender. She plays for Mynavi Sendai and the Japan national team.

== Club career ==
Ichise was born in Tokushima on August 4, 1997. After graduating from high school, she joined Vegalta Sendai (later Mynavi Vegalta Sendai) in 2016.

== National team career ==
Ichise played for Japan U-17 national team at 2014 U-17 World Cup and Japan U-20 national team at 2016 U-20 World Cup. Japan won the championship at U-17 World Cup and 3rd place at U-20 World Cup. On April 9, 2017, she debuted for Japan national team against Costa Rica. In 2018, she played for 2018 Asian Cup where Japan won the championship. She played 15 games for Japan.

== National team statistics ==
Japan national team
| Year | Apps | Goals |
|---|---|---|
| 2017 | 6 | 0 |
| 2018 | 9 | 0 |
| 2019 | 4 | 0 |
| Total | 19 | 0 |
