= Miho Manya =

Japanese footballer

Miho Manya 万屋 美穂
Personal information
- Full name: Miho Manya
- Date of birth: November 5, 1996 (age 30)
- Place of birth: Osaka, Japan
- Height: 1.59 m (5 ft 2 1/2 in)
- Position: Defender

Youth career
- 2012–2014: Hinomoto Gakuen High School

Senior career*
| Years | Team | Apps | (Gls) |
| 2015–2023 | Mynavi Sendai | 96 | (1) |
| Total | | 96 | (1) |

International career
| 2012 | Japan U-17 | 1 | (0) |
| 2017 | Japan | 7 | (0) |
Medal record
Mynavi Vegalta Sendai
| Runner-up | Nadeshiko League | 2015 |
Representing Japan
AFC U-16 Women's Championship
| Gold medal – first place | 2011 China |
- * Club domestic league appearances and goals as of June 18, 2023

Miho Manya (万屋 美穂, Manya Miho; born Nonember 5, 1996) is a Japanese former footballer who played as a defender. She plays for Mynavi Sendai Ladies in the WE League. She played for Japan national team.

== Club career ==
Manya was born in Osaka Prefecture on November 5, 1996. After graduating from high school, she joined Vegalta Sendai (later Mynavi Vegalta Sendai) in 2015. However, she can not play in L.League competition for injury in 2015 and 2016 season. In 2017, she debuted in L.League and became a regular player as left side back.

== National team career ==
In 2012, Manya was selected Japan U-17 national team for 2012 U-17 World Cup. On July 27, 2017, she debuted for Japan national team against Brazil. She played 7 games for Japan in 2017.

== National team statistics ==
Japan national team
| Year | Apps | Goals |
|---|---|---|
| 2017 | 7 | 0 |
| Total | 7 | 0 |
