= 2026 CONCACAF W Champions Cup final =

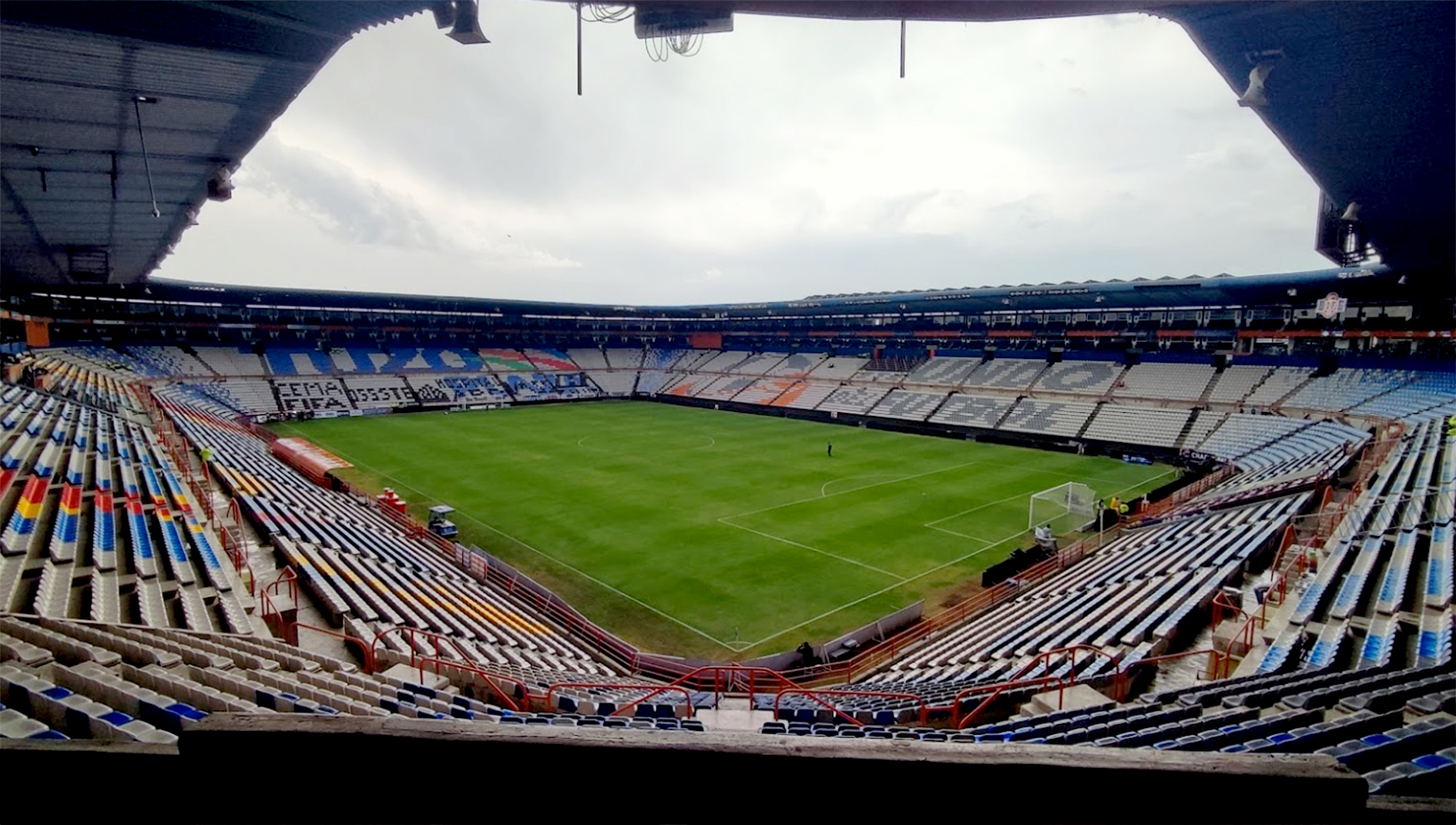
- Estadio Hidalgo hosted the final
- Event: 2025–26 CONCACAF W Champions Cup
América	Washington Spirit
(Mexico)	(United States)
5	3
- Date: 23 May 2026
- Venue: Estadio Hidalgo, Pachuca
- Player of the Match: Scarlett Camberos (América)
- Referee: Carly Shaw-MacLaren (Canada)
- Attendance: 9,035

The 2026 CONCACAF W Champions Cup final was the final match of the 2025–26 CONCACAF W Champions Cup, the second season of North America, Central America, and the Caribbean's premier club association football tournament organized by CONCACAF. It was played on 23 May 2026.

== Match ==
=== Details ===
23 May 2026
19:30 UTC−6

América (Mexico)	5–3	(United States) Washington Spirit
Aviléz 22'; Geyse 27', 61'; Guerrero 79'; Morgan 90+6' (o.g.)	Report	Cantore 30'; Kouassi 46', 58'

Estadio Hidalgo, Pachuca
Attendance: 9,035
Referee: Carly Shaw-MacLaren (Canada)

América	Washington Spirit

GK	12	(Mexico) Itzel Velasco
RB	3	(Mexico) Karina Rodríguez		(substituted off) 59'
CB	2	(Brazil) Isa Haas
CB	15	(Mexico) Kimberly Rodríguez
LB	28	(Mexico) Sofía Ramos
DM	5	(Venezuela) Gabriela García	(yellow card) 70'
RM	19	(Mexico) Montserrat Saldívar		(substituted off) 59'
CM	18	(Mexico) Nancy Antonio		(substituted off) 90+1'
CM	11	(Mexico) Aylín Aviléz	(yellow card) 56'	(substituted off) 59'
LM	10	(Mexico) Scarlett Camberos (c)
CF	17	(Brazil) Geyse	(yellow card) 66'
Substitutes:
GK	1	(Spain) Sandra Paños
GK	51	(Mexico) Valentina Murrieta
DF	4	(Nigeria) Chidinma Okeke		(substituted on) 90+1'
DF	26	(Mexico) Karen Luna		(substituted on) 60'
MF	8	(Spain) Irene Guerrero		(substituted on) 60'
MF	13	(Mexico) Xcaret Pineda
MF	14	(Mexico) Alexa Soto
MF	16	(Mexico) Julie López
MF	22	(United States) Sarah Luebbert		(substituted on) 59'
FW	21	(Mexico) Daniela Espinosa
FW	24	(Mexico) Alondra Cabanillas
FW	30	(United States) Giana Riley
Head coach:
(Spain) Ángel Villacampa

GK	18	(Scotland) Sandy MacIver
RB	14	(Canada) Gabby Carle		(substituted off) 86'
CB	9	(United States) Tara Rudd (c)
CB	24	(England) Esme Morgan
LB	13	(Italy) Lucia Di Guglielmo		(substituted off) 86'
CM	4	(Mexico) Rebeca Bernal
CM	17	(United States) Hal Hershfelt
RW	18	(Ivory Coast) Rosemonde Kouassi
AM	9	(Colombia) Leicy Santos		(substituted off) 86'
LW	2	(United States) Trinity Rodman	(yellow card) 42'	(substituted off) 68'
CF	27	(Italy) Sofia Cantore
Substitutes:
GK	31	(United States) Kaylie Collins
GK	26	(United States) Tyler McCamey
DF	5	(Canada) Élisabeth Tsé
DF	6	(United States) Kate Wiesner		(substituted on) 86'
DF	26	(United States) Paige Metayer
DF	35	(United States) Madison Haugen
MF	20	(Nigeria) Deborah Abiodun
MF	34	(United States) Molly Skurcenski
FW	11	(Paraguay) Claudia Martínez	(yellow card) 89'	(substituted on) 68'
FW	12	(United States) Andi Sullivan		(substituted on) 86'
FW	16	(Brazil) Tamara Bolt
FW	21	(Nigeria) Gift Monday		(substituted on) 86'
FW	29	(United States) Emma Gaines-Ramos
Head coach:
(Spain) Adrián González

Player of the Match:
Scarlett Camberos (América)

Assistant referees:
Melissa Snedden (Canada)
Stephanie-Dale Yee Sing (Jamaica)
Fourth official:
Janeishka Caban (Puerto Rico)
