= 2024–25 CONCACAF W Champions Cup =

1st season of CONCACAF women's club football tournament

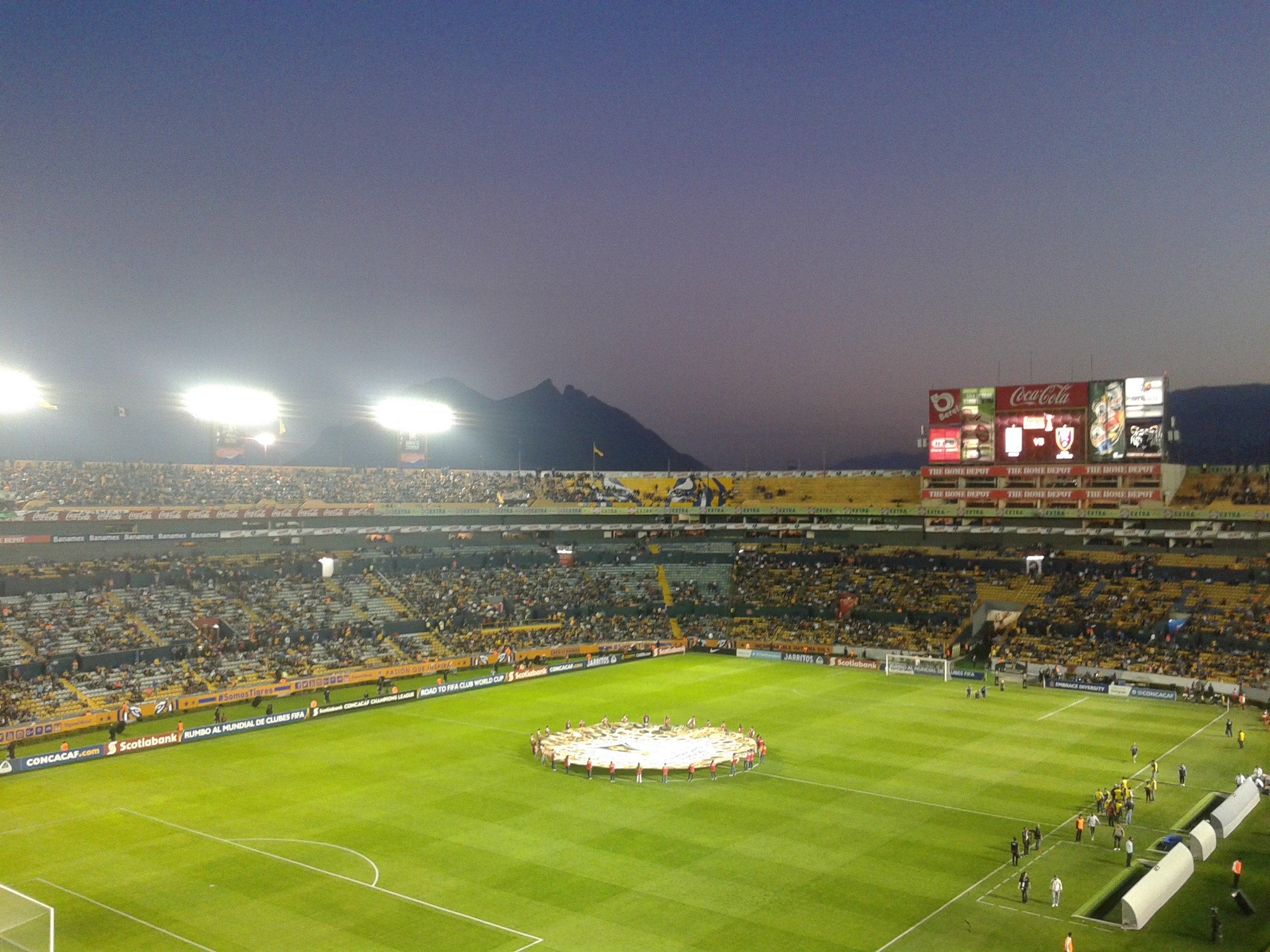
- The Estadio Universitario in San Nicolás de los Garza hosted the final stage.

Tournament details
- Dates: Preliminary round: 15 August 2024; Competition proper: 20 August 2024 – 24 May 2025
- Teams: Competition proper: 10; Total: 11 (from 7 associations)

Final positions
- Champions: (United States) Gotham FC (1st title)
- Runners-up: (Mexico) Tigres UANL
- Third place: (United States) Portland Thorns
- Fourth place: (Mexico) América

Tournament statistics
- Matches played: 24
- Goals scored: 102 (4.25 per match)
- Top scorer(s): (Portugal) Ana Dias (Tigres UANL) (Mexico) María Sánchez (San Diego Wave) (4 goals each)
- Best player: (Spain) Esther González (Gotham FC)
- Best young player: (United States) Olivia Moultrie (Portland Thorns)
- Best goalkeeper: (Mexico) Itzel González (Tigres UANL)
- Fair play award: (Mexico) América

The 2024–25 CONCACAF W Champions Cup was the first season of the CONCACAF W Champions Cup, the annual continental women's association football club competition organized by CONCACAF. The final was played on May 24, 2025, at Estadio Universitario in Nuevo León, Mexico. American club Gotham FC of the National Women's Soccer League defeated hosts Tigres UANL of the Liga MX Femenil 1–0. As winners, Gotham FC qualified for both the (inaugural) 2026 FIFA Women's Champions Cup, and the (inaugural) 2028 FIFA Women's Club World Cup.

== Format ==
On 12 March 2024, CONCACAF announced the inaugural edition of the CONCACAF W Champions Cup. The tournament featured eleven teams from seven CONCACAF member associations. The winner of a preliminary round match between a club from Canada and El Salvador joined the remaining nine teams in the group stage. In the group stage, teams were split into two groups of five teams. Teams faced each other in a single round-robin format, with each team playing two matches at home and two matches away in August, September and October 2024. The top two clubs from each group advanced to the knockout stage, which was played at a centralized location on 21–24 May 2025. The knockout stage featured semi-finals, a final to determine the champions of the competition, and a third place play-off.

The tournament was originally intended to provide a pathway for a future FIFA Women's Club World Cup which FIFA had committed to launching in the future, but with the postponement of the Women's Club World Cup to 2028, FIFA awarded the winner of the 2024–25 CONCACAF W Champions Cup a semifinal spot in the 2026 FIFA Women's Champions Cup.

=== Tiebreakers ===
Teams in the group stage were ranked according to points (3 points for a win, 1 point for a draw, 0 points for a loss). If two or more teams were equal on points, the following tiebreaking criteria were applied, in the order given, to determine their rankings:

1. Goal difference in all group matches;
2. Goals scored in all group matches;
3. Points in head-to-head matches among the tied teams;
4. Goal difference in head-to-head matches among the tied teams;
5. Goals scored in head-to-head matches among the tied teams;
6. Lower number of disciplinary points (single yellow card = 1 point, double yellow card = 3 points, direct red card = 4 points, direct red card after single yellow card = 5 points);
7. Drawing of lots.

== Association team allocation ==
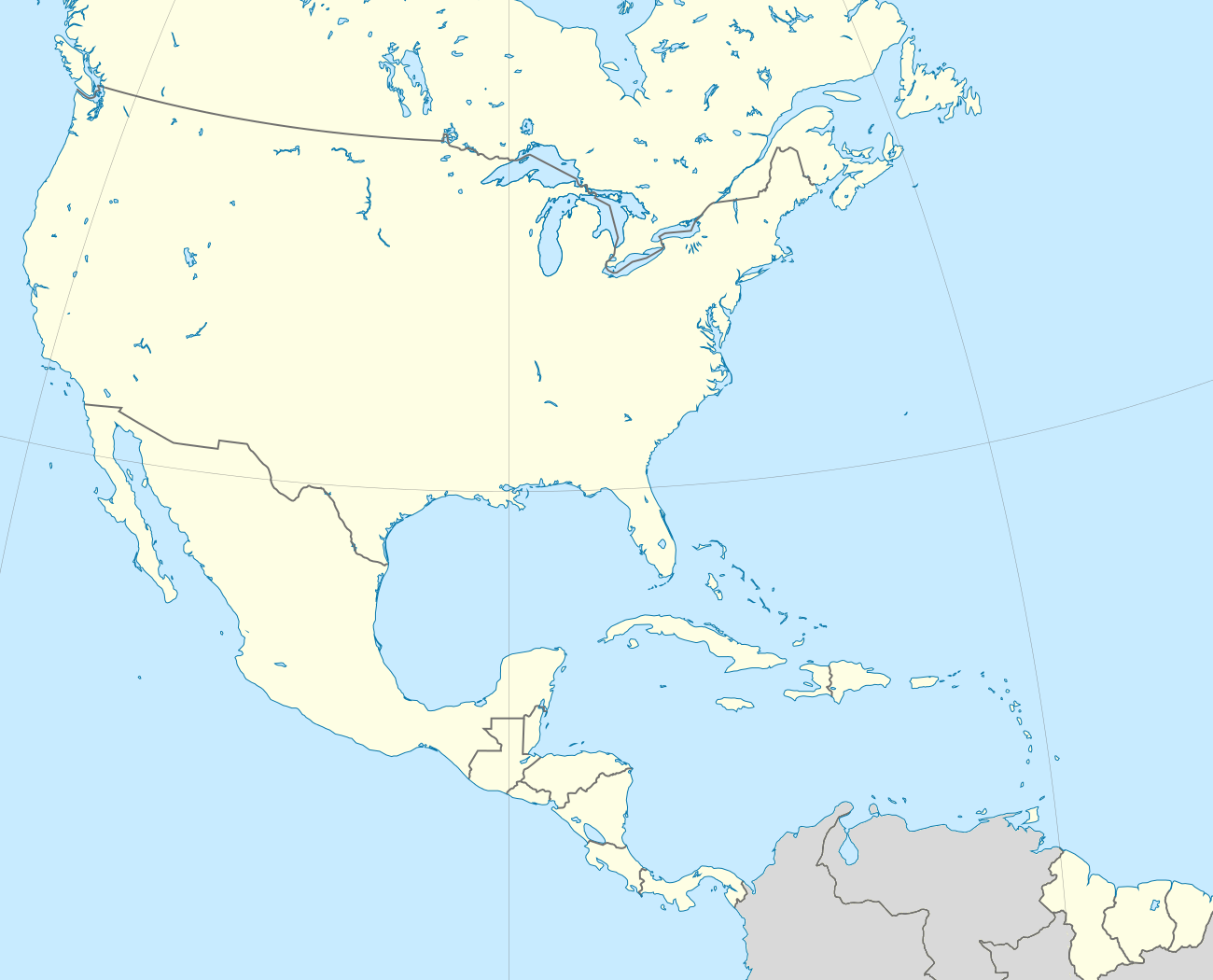
Location of teams of the 2024–25 CONCACAF W Champions Cup

CONCACAF allocated spots to seven of their member associations based on eligibility criteria. Each association had one spot in the tournament, with the exception of Mexico and the United States, which had three.

=== Distribution ===
The following was the access list for the 2024–25 season.

Access list for 2024–25 CONCACAF W Champions Cup
Member association	Slots	
Member association	Group stage	Preliminary round
Mexico	3	0
United States	3	0
Costa Rica	1	0
Jamaica	1	0
Panama	1	0
Canada	0	1
El Salvador	0	1
Participating associations: 7	9	2
Participating associations: 7	11	

=== Teams ===
Teams qualified through their domestic leagues based on sporting merit. The qualification criteria, confirmed on 24 April 2024, were proposed by each member association and ratified by CONCACAF.

Qualified teams for 2024–25 CONCACAF W Champions Cup
Association	Team	Qualification method
Teams entering in group stage
Costa Rica (1 berth)	Alajuelense	2023 Costa Rican Women's Premier Division Apertura and Clausura champions
Jamaica (1 berth)	Frazsiers Whip	2022–23 Jamaica Women's Premier League champions
Mexico (3 berths)	Tigres UANL	2023 Liga MX Femenil Apertura champions
Mexico (3 berths)	Monterrey	2024 Liga MX Femenil Clausura champions
Mexico (3 berths)	América	Best runner-up of the 2023–24 Liga MX Femenil season based on accumulated points during the regular phase
Panama (1 berth)	Santa Fe	2024 Panamanian Women's Football League Apertura champions
United States (3 berths)	NJ/NY Gotham	2023 National Women's Soccer League champions
United States (3 berths)	San Diego Wave	2023 National Women's Soccer League Shield winners
United States (3 berths)	Portland Thorns	2023 National Women's Soccer League Shield runners-up
Teams entering in preliminary round
Canada (1 berth)	Whitecaps FC Girls Elite	2023 League1 Canada Inter-Provincial Championship champions
El Salvador (1 berth)	Alianza	2023–24 Primera División Femenina de El Salvador Apertura–Clausura play-off winners

=== Seeding ===
The pots were confirmed on 7 May 2024, with the qualifying teams being split into six pots of two teams.

Pot	Team
1	(Canada) Whitecaps FC Girls Elite
1	(El Salvador) Alianza
2	(United States) NJ/NY Gotham
2	(United States) San Diego Wave
3	(United States) Portland Thorns
3	(Mexico) Tigres UANL
4	(Mexico) América
4	(Mexico) Monterrey
5	(Costa Rica) Alajuelense
5	(Panama) Santa Fe
6	(Jamaica) Frazsiers Whip
6	Preliminary round winner

=== Draw ===
The draw for the group stage was held on 6 June 2024 at 20:00 EDT (UTC−4). A team was randomly drawn from Pot 1, consisting of the two Preliminary Round teams, to determine the host of the Preliminary Round match. Then, the ten Group Stage teams (the nine direct qualifiers for the Group Stage plus the as-then-unknown winner of the Preliminary Round) were drawn into two groups of five. The Group Stage draw began by randomly selecting a team from Pot 2 and placing them into Group A and then selecting the remaining team from Pot 2 and placing them into Group B. The Group Stage draw continued with the same procedure done for the remaining pots.

== Schedule ==
The schedule of the competition was as follows.

Schedule for 2024–25 CONCACAF W Champions Cup
Phase	Round	Match date
Qualifying	Preliminary round	13–15 August 2024
Group stage	Matchday 1	20–22 August 2024
Group stage	Matchday 2	2–5 September 2024
Group stage	Matchday 3	17–19 September 2024
Group stage	Matchday 4	1–3 October 2024
Group stage	Matchday 5	15–17 October 2024
Knockout stage	Semi-finals	21 May 2025
Knockout stage	Third place play-off	24 May 2025
Knockout stage	Final	24 May 2025

== Preliminary round ==
The qualified teams from Canada and El Salvador participated in the preliminary round, with the winner joining the remaining nine teams in the group stage.

15 August 2024
18:00 UTC−6

Alianza (Salvadoran Football Federation)	0–1	(Canadian Soccer Association) Whitecaps Girls Elite
	Report	Wong 25' (pen.)

Estadio Cuscatlán, San Salvador
Referee: Crystal Sobers (Trinidad & Tobago)

== Group stage ==
=== Group A ===
Pos	Team	Pld	W	D	L	GF	GA	GD	Pts	Qualification	TUA	NYJ	MON	LDA	FRA
1	(Mexico) Tigres UANL	4	3	1	0	18	6	+12	10	Advance to knockout stage	—	—	4–0	3–1	—
2	(United States) NJ/NY Gotham	4	2	2	0	21	4	+17	8	Advance to knockout stage	4–4	—	0–0	—	—
3	(Mexico) Monterrey	4	2	1	1	8	4	+4	7		—	—	—	3–0	5–0
4	(Costa Rica) Alajuelense	4	1	0	3	6	10	−4	3		—	0–4	—	—	5–0
5	(Jamaica) Frazsiers Whip	4	0	0	4	1	30	−29	0		1–7	0–13	—	—	—

Source: CONCACAF
Rules for classification: Tiebreakers
20 August 2024
18:00 UTC−6

Alajuelense (Costa Rica)	5–0	(Jamaica) Frazsiers Whip
Coto 60'; Mills 62'; Rangel 65'; Mesén 77', 81'	Report

Estadio Alejandro Morera Soto, Alajuela
Referee: Karen Hernández (Mexico)
22 August 2024
20:00 UTC−5

Tigres UANL (Mexico)	4–0	(Mexico) Monterrey
Reyes 23'; Hermoso 32'; Kgatlana 45+2'; Ferral 71'	Report

Estadio Universitario, San Nicolás de los Garza
Referee: Ekaterina Koroleva (United States)

5 September 2024
18:00 UTC−6

Alajuelense (Costa Rica)	0–4	(United States) NJ/NY Gotham
	Report	González 3'; Stengel 31' (pen.); Nighswonger 45+1'; Sheehan 54'

Estadio Alejandro Morera Soto, Alajuela
Referee: Merlin Soto (Honduras)
5 September 2024
21:00 UTC−5

Monterrey (Mexico)	5–0	(Jamaica) Frazsiers Whip
García 15'; Cázares 32'; Restrepo 51', 66'; Bernal 87'	Report

Estadio BBVA, Guadalupe
Referee: Deily Gomez (Costa Rica)

18 September 2024
19:00 UTC−5

Frazsiers Whip (Jamaica)	1–7	(Mexico) Tigres UANL
Richards 55'	Report	Dias 6'; Seiça 14'; Kgatlana 23'; González 60' (pen.); Cruz 62'; Mayor 81', 90+8'

National Stadium, Kingston
Referee: Vimarest Díaz (Dominican Republic)
19 September 2024
19:00 UTC−4

NJ/NY Gotham (United States)	0–0	(Mexico) Monterrey
	Report

Red Bull Arena, Harrison
Referee: Odette Hamilton (Jamaica)

2 October 2024
19:00 UTC−5

Frazsiers Whip (Jamaica)	0–13	(United States) NJ/NY Gotham
	Report	Ryan 13', 18', 90+2'; Freeman 39'; Kizer 45+5'; Nighswonger 47'; Torres 52', 53'; Williams 82', 86', 90+3'; Silva 84'; Able 85' (o.g.)

National Stadium, Kingston
Referee: Amairany Garcìa (Mexico)
3 October 2024
20:00 UTC−5

Tigres UANL (Mexico)	3–1	(Costa Rica) Alajuelense
Dias 33'; Reyes 61'; Rodríguez 65'	Report	Varela 21'

Estadio Universitario, San Nicolás de los Garza
Referee: Mayary Cartagena (Guatemala)

16 October 2024
20:00 UTC−4

NJ/NY Gotham (United States)	4–4	(Mexico) Tigres UANL
Zerboni 4'; González 21'; Sheehan 42'; López 71'	Report	Mayor 6'; Dias 15', 25'; Ovalle 60' (pen.)

Red Bull Arena, Harrison
Referee: Astrid Gramajo (Guatemala)
17 October 2024
20:00 UTC−5

Monterrey (Mexico)	3–0	(Costa Rica) Alajuelense
García 53', 57'; Bernal 81'	Report

Estadio BBVA, Guadalupe
Referee: Alyssa Nichols (United States)

=== Group B ===
Pos	Team	Pld	W	D	L	GF	GA	GD	Pts	Qualification	AME	POR	SDW	WFC	SFE
1	(Mexico) América	4	3	0	1	14	3	+11	9	Advance to knockout stage	—	—	—	7–0	5–0
2	(United States) Portland Thorns	4	3	0	1	13	5	+8	9	Advance to knockout stage	3–1	—	—	—	2–1
3	(United States) San Diego Wave	4	3	0	1	7	3	+4	9		0–1	3–2	—	—	—
4	(Canada) Whitecaps Girls Elite	4	1	0	3	2	16	−14	3		—	0–6	0–2	—	—
5	(Panama) Santa Fe	4	0	0	4	2	11	−9	0		—	—	0–2	1–2	—

Source: CONCACAF
Rules for classification: Tiebreakers
20 August 2024
21:00 UTC−5

Santa Fe (Panama)	0–2	(United States) San Diego Wave
	Report	Sánchez 2'; McNabb 64'

Estadio Rommel Fernández, Panama City
Attendance: 2,093
Referee: Astrid Gramajo (Guatemala)
21 August 2024
20:00 UTC−5

América (Mexico)	7–0	(Canada) Whitecaps Girls Elite
Luebbert 20'; Hernández 25'; Palacios 26'; Camberos 31'; Guerrero 50'; Aviléz 73'; Zuazua 85'	Report

Estadio Ciudad de los Deportes, Mexico City
Referee: Natalie Simon (United States)

4 September 2024
19:00 UTC−5

Santa Fe (Panama)	1–2	(Canada) Whitecaps Girls Elite
Murillo 85' (pen.)	Report	Ziff 34'; Reed 78'

Estadio Universidad Latina, Penonomé
Referee: Priscila Pérez (Mexico)
4 September 2024
19:00 UTC−7

Portland Thorns (United States)	3–1	(Mexico) América
Sinclair 13', 28'; Turner 52'	Report	Guerrero 53'

Providence Park, Portland
Referee: Myriam Marcotte (Canada)

18 September 2024
19:00 UTC−7

San Diego Wave (United States)	3–2	(United States) Portland Thorns
Sánchez 67' (pen.), 69', 85' (pen.)	Report	Smith 25'; Turner 54'

Snapdragon Stadium, San Diego
Referee: Merlin Soto (Honduras)
19 September 2024
20:00 UTC−5

América (Mexico)	5–0	(Panama) Santa Fe
Luna 27'; Luebbert 43'; Palacios 52', 57'; Valdez 70'	Report

Estadio Ciudad de los Deportes, Mexico City
Referee: Marianela Araya (Costa Rica)

1 October 2024
18:30 UTC−7

Whitecaps Girls Elite (Canada)	0–2	(United States) San Diego Wave
	Report	Torpey 59'; Ali 67'

BC Place, Vancouver
Referee: Aranza Quero (Mexico)
1 October 2024
19:30 UTC−7

Portland Thorns (United States)	2–1	(Panama) Santa Fe
D'Aquila 10' (pen.); Linnehan 64'	Report	Márquez 82'

Providence Park, Portland
Referee: Carly Shaw-MacLaren (Canada)

15 October 2024
19:00 UTC−7

Whitecaps Girls Elite (Canada)	0–6	(United States) Portland Thorns
	Report	D'Aquila 22', 38'; Linnehan 54'; Spaanstra 58'; Sinclair 85'; Reyes 90+5'

BC Place, Vancouver
Referee: Francia González (Mexico)
16 October 2024
19:00 UTC−7

San Diego Wave (United States)	0–1	(Mexico) América
	Report	Luebbert 59'

Snapdragon Stadium, San Diego
Referee: Crystal Sobers (Trinidad and Tobago)

== Knockout stage ==
In the knockout stage, if a match were level at the end of normal playing time, extra time was played (two periods of 15 minutes each). If still tied after extra time, the match was decided by a penalty shoot-out. On 26 December 2024, CONCACAF announced that Estadio Universitario in Nuevo León, Mexico would host the knockout stage of the tournament.

=== Bracket ===
Semi-finals
21 May – San Nicolás
(Mexico) Tigres UANL	2
(United States) Portland Thorns	0
21 May – San Nicolás
(Mexico) América	1
(United States) Gotham FC	3

Final
24 May – San Nicolás
(Mexico) Tigres UANL	0
(United States) Gotham FC	1
Third place play-off
24 May – San Nicolás
(Mexico) América	0
(United States) Portland Thorns	3

=== Semi-finals ===
21 May 2025
19:30 ET

América (Mexico)	1–3	(United States) Gotham FC
Guerrero 38'	Report	Geyse 21'; Purce 30' (pen.); Gutiérrez 33' (o.g.)

Estadio Universitario, San Nicolás de los Garza (Mexico)
Referee: Odette Hamilton (Jamaica)

21 May 2025
21:30 ET

Tigres UANL (Mexico)	2–0	(United States) Portland Thorns
Farmer 10'; Kgatlana 27'	Report

Estadio Universitario, San Nicolás de los Garza (Mexico)
Referee: Carly Shaw-MacLaren (Canada)

=== Third place play-off ===
24 May 2025
19:00 ET

América (Mexico)	0–3	(United States) Portland Thorns
	Report	Tordin 45'; Linnehan 52'; Moultrie 81'

Estadio Universitario, San Nicolás de los Garza (Mexico)
Referee: Astrid Gramajo (Guatemala)

=== Final ===
The winners qualified for both the inaugural FIFA Women's Champions Cup to be held in 2026 and the inaugural FIFA Women's Club World Cup to be held in 2028.

24 May 2025
21:00 CT

Tigres UANL (Mexico)	0–1	(United States) Gotham FC
	Report	González 82'

Estadio Universitario, San Nicolás de los Garza
Referee: Marianela Araya (Costa Rica)

== Awards ==
The following players and team earned top distinctions.

Golden Ball	Golden Boot	Golden Glove
(Spain) Esther González (Gotham FC)	(Portugal) Ana Dias (Tigres UANL)	(Mexico) Itzel González (Tigres UANL)
Young Player Award
(United States) Olivia Moultrie (Portland Thorns)
CONCACAF Fair Play Trophy
(Mexico) América

== Goalscorers ==
Rank	Player	Team	Goals
1	(Portugal) Ana Dias	(Mexico) Tigres UANL	4
1	(Mexico) María Sánchez	(United States) San Diego Wave	4
3	(United States) Izzy D'Aquila	(United States) Portland Thorns	3
3	(Spain) Lucía García	(Mexico) Monterrey	3
3	(Spain) Esther González	(United States) NJ/NY Gotham	3
3	(Spain) Irene Guerrero	(Mexico) América	3
3	(South Africa) Thembi Kgatlana	(Mexico) Tigres UANL	3
3	(United States) Sarah Luebbert	(Mexico) América	3
3	(Mexico) Stephany Mayor	(Mexico) Tigres UANL	3
3	(Mexico) Kiana Palacios	(Mexico) América	3
3	(United States) Yazmeen Ryan	(United States) NJ/NY Gotham	3
3	(Canada) Christine Sinclair	(United States) Portland Thorns	3
3	(United States) Lynn Williams	(United States) NJ/NY Gotham	3

== See also ==
- 2025 CONCACAF Champions Cup
