= Karen Luna =

Mexican footballer (born 1998)

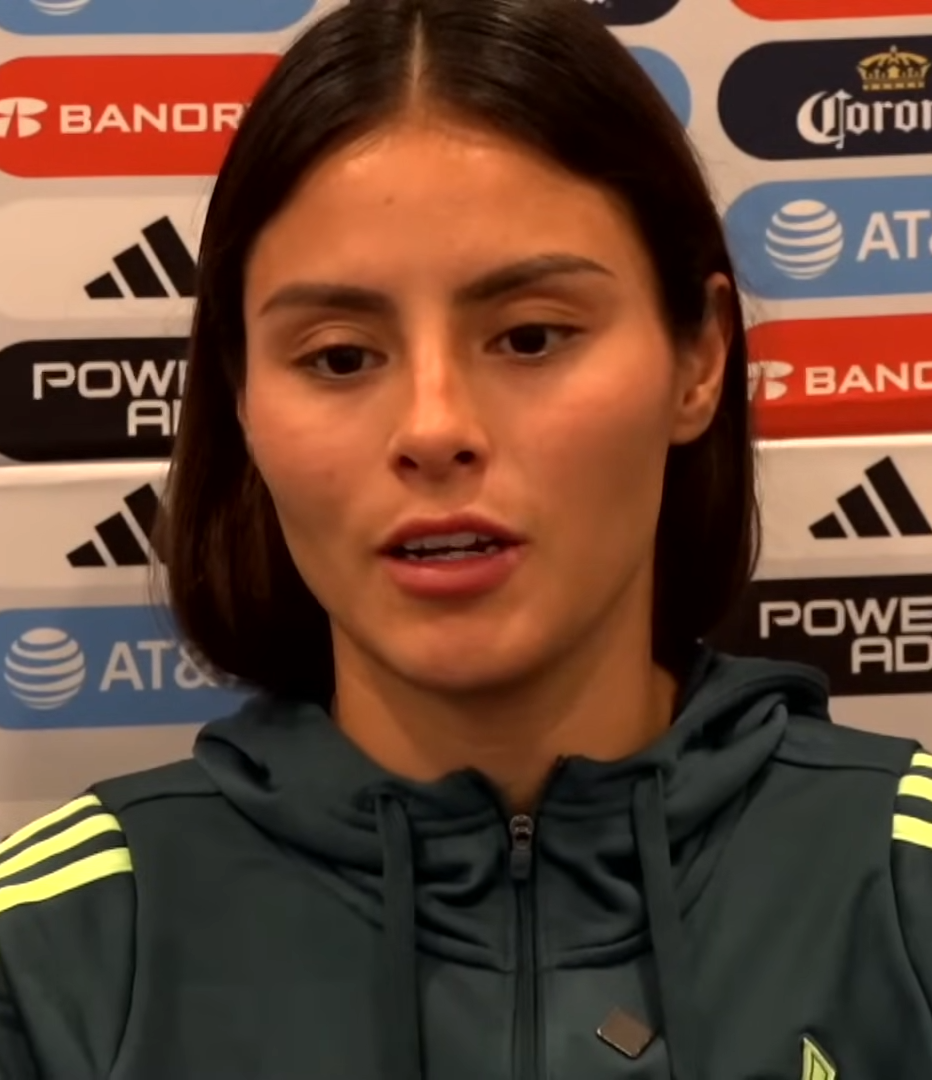
- Luna in 2024

Personal information
- Full name: Karen Irasema Luna De Los Santos
- Date of birth: 12 February 1998 (age 28)
- Place of birth: San Nicolás de los Garza, Nuevo León, Mexico
- Height: 1.69 m (5 ft 7 in)
- Position: Defender

Team information
- Current team: América
- Number: 26

Senior career*
Years	Team	Apps	(Gls)
2017–2021	UANL	108	(2)
2021–	América	158	(15)

International career^{‡}
2024–	Mexico	13	(2)
- * Club domestic league appearances and goals as of 24 May 2026 ‡ National team caps and goals as of 13 July 2025

Karen Irasema Luna De Los Santos (born 12 February 1998) is a Mexican professional footballer who plays as a defender for Liga MX Femenil club América and the Mexico national team.

== Club career ==
Previous to her professional career, Luna was part of the women's football team of the Autonomous University of Nuevo León.

=== Tigres UANL (2017–2021) ===
Luna signed her first professional contract with Tigres UANL in 2017, ahead of the first Liga MX Femenil season. Prior to joining Tigres, Luna declined an offer to join their city rivals, C.F. Monterrey.

During her time at Tigres, Luna made more than 100 appearances over a period of four years and played an important role in the club's success, contributing to four league championships. Luna decided to part ways with Tigres at the conclusion of the Guard1anes 2021 tournament due to the limited playing time she was receiving in the last few tournaments.

=== Club América (2021–2025) ===
Luna joined Club América on 21 June 2021. At América, Luna quickly adjusted and became an important part of the team within her first season under then-manager Craig Harrington. Luna was a key player for América to obtain its second league title in history during the Clausura 2023 tournament by starting all the liguilla games including the final.

== International career ==
Luna was named to the Mexico women's national football team by manager Pedro López for the first time on 24 January 2024 for a training camp ahead of the 2024 CONCACAF W Gold Cup. She was officially included in Mexico's squad for the 2024 CONCACAF W Gold Cup on 10 February 2024.

Luna made her debut with Mexico on 21 February 2024, during the inaugural match of the 2024 CONCACAF W Gold Cup against Argentina. She scored her first goal with Mexico on 26 February 2024, in a 0–8 victory against Dominican Republic for the second match of the group stage of the tournament.

== Career statistics ==
=== Club ===
As of match played 13 July 2025

Appearances and goals by club, season, and competition
Club	Season	League			National cup (Note: Includes Campeón de Campeonas)		League cup (Note: Includes Summer Cup)		Continental (Note: Includes CONCACAF W Champions Cup)		Total	
Club	Season	Division	Apps	Goals	Apps	Goals	Apps	Goals	Apps	Goals	Apps	Goals
Tigres UANL	2017–18	Liga MX Femenil	24	1	—		—		—		24	1
Tigres UANL	2018–19	Liga MX Femenil	34	0	—		—		—		34	0
Tigres UANL	2019-20	Liga MX Femenil	23	1	—		—		—		23	1
Tigres UANL	2020–21	Liga MX Femenil	27	0	—		—		—		27	0
Tigres UANL	Total		108	2	—		—		—		108	2
Club América	2021–22	Liga MX Femenil	37	2	—		—		—		37	2
Club América	2022–23	Liga MX Femenil	41	1	—		—		—		41	1
Club América	2023–24	Liga MX Femenil	39	5	2	0	—		—		41	5
Club América	2024–25	Liga MX Femenil	37	7	—		2	1	4	1	25	9
Club América	Total		154	15	2	0	2	1	4	1	162	17
Career total			262	17	2	0	2	1	4	1	270	19

=== International ===
As of match played 30 November 2024

Appearances and goals by national team and year
National team	Year	Apps	Goals
Mexico	2024	12	2
Mexico	2025	1	0
Total		13	2

List of international goals scored by Karen Luna
No.	Date	Venue	Opponent	Score	Result	Competition
1.	23 February 2024	Dignity Health Sports Park, Carson, United States	Dominican Republic	3–0	8–0	2024 CONCACAF W Gold Cup
2.	3 March 2024	BMO Stadium, Los Angeles, United States	Paraguay	2–0	3-2	2024 CONCACAF W Gold Cup

== Honours ==
Tigres UANL

- Liga MX Femenil: Clausura 2018, Clausura 2019, Guard1anes 2020, Guard1anes 2021

Club América

- Liga MX Femenil: Clausura 2023, Clausura 2026
- CONCACAF W Champions Cup: 2025–26

Individual

- CONCACAF W Gold Cup Best XI: 2024
