= Julie López =

Mexican footballer (born 2005)

Personal information
- Full name: Julie Anna López Carrillo
- Date of birth: 24 February 2005 (age 21)
- Place of birth: California, United States, Mexico
- Height: 1.70 m (5 ft 7 in)
- Position: Defensive midfielder

Team information
- Current team: América
- Number: 16

College career
Years	Team	Apps	(Gls)
2023–2025	Long Beach State	27	(0)

Senior career*
Years	Team	Apps	(Gls)
2026–	América	2	(0)

International career
2022	Mexico U-17		
- * Club domestic league appearances and goals as of 31 January 2026

Julie Anna López Carrillo (born 24 February 2005) is a professional footballer who plays as a Defensive midfielder for Liga MX Femenil side América. Born and raised in the United States, she represents Mexico internationally.

== Club career ==
López started her career with América in 2026.

== International career ==
López was part of the Mexico U-17 side that participated at the 2022 FIFA U-17 Women's World Cup.

== Honours ==
Club América

- Liga MX Femenil: Clausura 2026
- Liga MX Femenil: Campeón de Campeonas 2025–26
- CONCACAF W Champions Cup: 2025–26
