= Xcaret Pineda =

Mexican footballer (born 2004)

Personal information
- Full name: Xcaret Pineda Torres
- Date of birth: 30 January 2004 (age 22)
- Place of birth: Illinois, United States
- Height: 1.67 m (5 ft 6 in)
- Position: Attacking midfielder

Team information
- Current team: América
- Number: 13

College career
Years	Team	Apps	(Gls)
2022–2025	Oklahoma State Cowgirls	75	(19)

Senior career*
Years	Team	Apps	(Gls)
2026–	América	14	(2)

International career
2026–	Mexico U23		
- * Club domestic league appearances and goals as of 14 May 2026

Xcaret Pineda Torres (born 30 January 2004) is a professional footballer who plays as a Attacking midfielder for Liga MX Femenil side América. Born and raised in the United States, she represents Mexico internationally.

== Career ==
Pineda started her career in 2026 with América.

== International career ==
Since 2026, Pineda has been part of the Mexico U-23 team.

== Honours ==
Club América

- Liga MX Femenil: Clausura 2026
- Liga MX Femenil: Campeón de Campeonas 2025–26
- CONCACAF W Champions Cup: 2025–26
