= Geyse =

Brazilian footballer (born 1998)

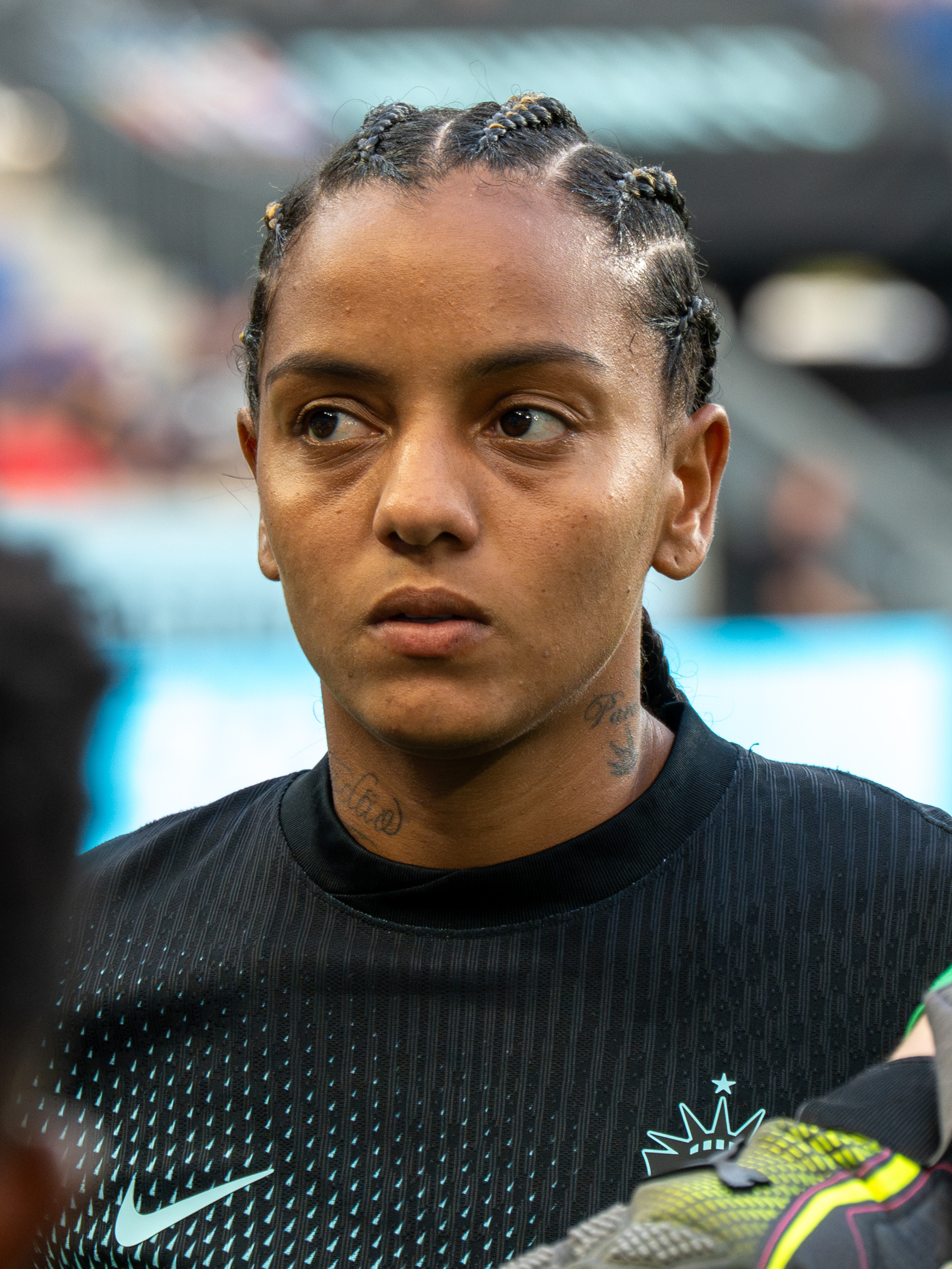
- Geyse in 2025 with Gotham FC

Personal information
- Full name: Geyse da Silva Ferreira
- Date of birth: 27 March 1998 (age 28)
- Place of birth: Maragogi, Alagoas, Brazil
- Height: 1.63 m (5 ft 4 in)
- Position: Forward

Team information
- Current team: América
- Number: 17

Youth career
- CESMAC
- União Desportiva

Senior career*
| Years | Team | Apps | (Gls) |
| 2016 | Centro Olímpico | 2 | (0) |
| 2017 | Corinthians | 14 | (1) |
| 2017–2018 | Madrid CFF | 11 | (2) |
| 2018–2019 | Benfica | 30 | (49) |
| 2020–2022 | Madrid CFF | 58 | (34) |
| 2022–2023 | Barcelona | 24 | (6) |
| 2023–2026 | Manchester United | 28 | (2) |
| 2025 | → Gotham FC (loan) | 17 | (2) |
| 2026– | América | 27 | (25) |

International career^{‡}
| 2016–2018 | Brazil U20 | 13 | (14) |
| 2017– | Brazil | 58 | (9) |
- * Club domestic league appearances and goals as of 18:39, 7 October 2026 (UTC) ‡ National team caps and goals as of 18:45, 10 October 2026 (UTC)

Geyse da Silva Ferreira (Brazilian Portuguese: [ˈɡejsi dʒi ˈsiwvɐ feˈʁejɾɐ]; born 27 March 1998), commonly known as Geyse and previously Pretinha ([pɾeˈtʃĩɲɐ]), is a Brazilian professional footballer who plays as a forward for Liga Femenil side Club América and the Brazil national team.

== Early life ==
She was born to Maria Cristina "Cris" Gomes da Silva, a street sweeper and daycare worker who raised Geyse and her five siblings—Aline, Geovanne, Gisele, Alisson, and José Willamys—as a single mother. Geyse's father, a fisherman, had an abusive relationship with her mother.

== Club career ==
=== Youth and early career ===
Geyse played futsal for two years in Pernambuco. She later played football for União Desportiva Alagoana (UDA), a team based in Maceió. She then moved to Centro Olímpico, where she made very few appearances.

=== Corinthians ===
Geyse debuted for Corinthians on 12 March 2017, scoring in a 4–0 win over São Francisco. In her single season with Corinthians, she played in 27 matches and scored nine goals.

=== Madrid CFF ===
Geyse made her first move to the Spanish Liga F in 2017 when she signed for the newly promoted Madrid CFF. She made just 11 appearances and scored two goals as Madrid finished 10th place in the league.

=== Benfica ===
In May 2018, it was announced Geyse had signed for newly formed Nacional II Divisão side Benfica. She joined her new team in September 2018, after the conclusion of her national team commitments for Brazil at the 2018 FIFA U-20 Women's World Cup. Geyse made her debut in the club's first match on 16 September, scoring five goals in a 28–0 victory over Ponte Frielas. The following match she scored another five goals as Benfica beat Os Vidreiros 19–0. Her record for goals scored in a single match was six, scored against Almeirim. Despite scoring 42 goals in 21 league appearances, Geyse finished fourth in the golden boot standings. Benfica teammate and Brazil international Darlene topped the standings. Benfica were crowned champions and earned promotion to Campeonato Nacional Feminino.

Geyse scored a further nine goals in the Taça de Portugal as Benfica won the trophy in their first season.

In January 2020, Benfica rescinded their contract with Geyse by mutual agreement.

=== Return to Madrid CFF ===
In January 2020, Geyse re-signed for Madrid CFF, which was at the bottom of the Primera División table. She scored five goals in 5 league matches before the 2019–20 league season was ended prematurely due to the COVID-19 pandemic in Spain. On 21 July 2020, Geyse extended her contract with Madrid CFF to the end of 2020–21 season.

On 21 April 2021, Geyse scored in the quarterfinal of the 2020–21 Copa de la Reina, a 2–1 victory over Real Madrid. Madrid CFF faced eventual treble-winners FC Barcelona in the semifinals, with Geyse playing all 90 minutes as they fell to a 4–0 defeat.

On 10 October 2021, Geyse scored four goals in a 5–4 win against Real Betis. In the quarterfinals of the 2021–22 Copa de la Reina, Geyse scored but was sent off with a red card; Madrid ended up losing the match in extra time. Although Madrid CFF finished 13th in the league, Geyse finished the season with a joint league-high total of 20 goals. She earned her first Pichichi title alongside Barcelona's Asisat Oshoala. Geyse became the first South American in the Spanish women's league to achieve the top scorer's honour.

=== Barcelona ===
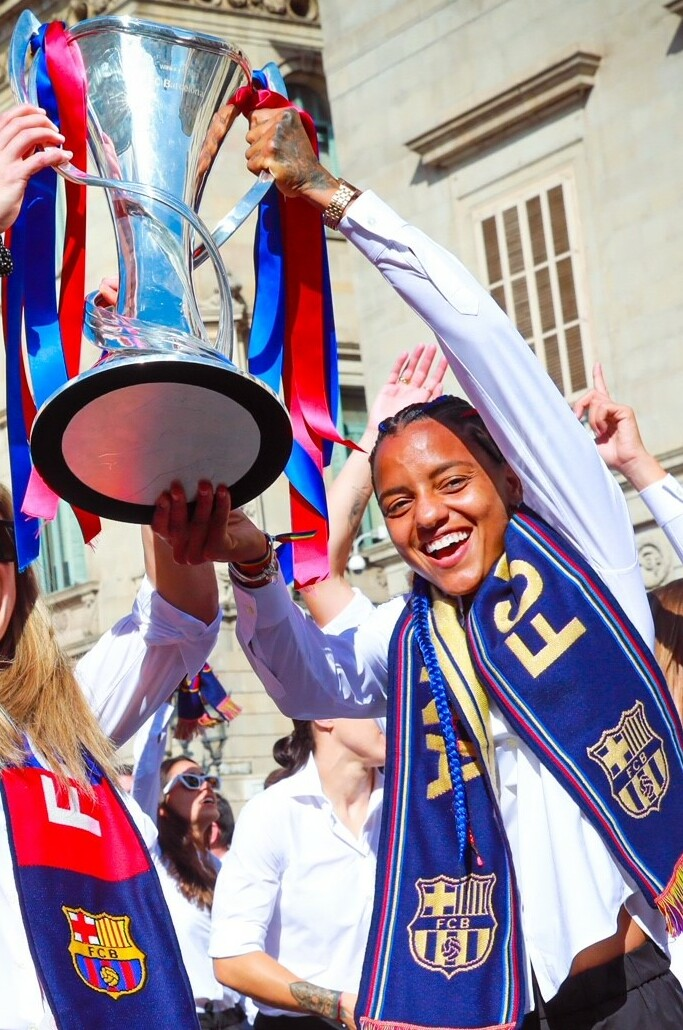
Geyse with the 2022–23 UEFA Women's Champions League trophy

In June 2022, Barcelona announced the signing of Geyse until 2024. She made her debut for the club in September 2022 alongside fellow debutants Lucy Bronze, Keira Walsh, and 16-year-old Vicky Lopez, and scored the match's second goal.

During her debut Champion's League appearance, Geyse scored twice and provided an assist; her first goal came just minutes after being substituted on.

In January 2023, Osasuna lodged a complaint against Barcelona following their 9–0 defeat in the Copa de la Reina. Osasuna claimed that Geyse — who scored the match's fourth goal — was ineligibly fielded following a suspension received for picking up two yellow cards during her final Copa de la Reina match with Madrid CFF. The RFEF disqualified Barcelona's result against Osasuna, leading to a technical expulsion from the competition.

With Barcelona, Geyse won the Liga F, Supercopa de España Femenina, and Champion's League in the 2022–23 season.

=== Manchester United ===
On 18 August 2023, English Women's Super League club Manchester United announced the signing of Geyse. In her first season, United won the Women's FA Cup, the club's first major title.

In January 2025, following the death of her brother, Geyse took a period of compassionate leave, returning to Manchester in March. After the match, she made a statement on Instagram suggesting she felt unhappy at the club; Manchester United stated that they "continue to support Geyse in her wellbeing and are continuing to look for options which suit all parties.” Geyse's agent accused the club of attempting to loan Geyse to a US club whilst she was attending her brother's funeral.

==== Loan to Gotham FC ====
On 24 March 2025, it was announced that Geyse would go on loan to National Women's Soccer League club Gotham FC for the remainder of the season, with an option for Gotham to acquire her permanently. She made her NWSL debut on 13 April 2025, coming on as a second-half substitute for Sarah Schupansky in a victory over the North Carolina Courage. In the following match, Geyse scored her first goal with Gotham FC as the team earned a 4–0 win over Angel City FC.

On 21 May 2025, in the semifinals of the 2024–25 CONCACAF W Champions Cup, Geyse scored the opening goal in a 3–1 win against Club América. On 25 May, she started in the final against Tigres, where Gotham secured a 1–0 victory to become the inaugural winners of the competition.

On 4 December, Gotham FC announced that Geyse would return to Manchester United at the conclusion of her loan.

=== Club América ===
Geyse signed for Liga MX Femenil side Club América on 13 January 2026. On 17 May 2026, she scored a goal and won a penalty in a 3–0 victory in the second leg of the Clausura 2026 final to win her first Liga MX Femenil championship. Three days later, she provided a hat trick of assists in a 4–1 win over former loan club Gotham FC in the CONCACAF W Champions Cup semifinals. In the final, she scored twice in a 5–3 win against the Washington Spirit, securing status as North American continental champion for the second consecutive season.

== International career ==
=== Youth national teams ===
In April 2015, 17-year-old Geyse's performances for União Desportiva in their run to the quarterfinal of the 2015 Copa do Brasil de Futebol Feminino led her to be called up for Brazil women's national under-20 football team training. She was called up for the 2016 FIFA U-20 Women's World Cup.

At the 2018 South American U-20 Women's Championship, Geyse scored four goals in the group stages, including two goals (a brace) in a 2–0 win over Venezuela and another brace in a 3–0 win over Uruguay. In the final stage, she scored once in every match, with one goal in Brazil's match against Colombia, two goals in their match against Venezuela, and five goals in their final match against Paraguay, which ended 8–1. Geyse finished as the tournament's top scorer with 12 total goals in 7 games and was selected as Player of the Tournament.

Geyse later competed with Brazil in her second FIFA U-20 Women's World Cup competition in August 2018. Brazil finished last in Group B with one point from three matches.

=== Senior national team ===
Geyse made her debut for the senior Brazil women's national football team in September 2017 as a substitute in a 4–0 win over Chile.

She was selected in Brazil's 23-player squad for the 2019 FIFA Women's World Cup in France. She Geyse made two appearances in Brazil's campaign: during their first group stage match against Jamaica, and their quarterfinal defeat against France.

Geyse scored her first senior national team goal at the 2021 SheBelieves Cup, Brazil's fourth goal in a 4–1 victory against Argentina. Later in the year, Geyse was called up by Pia Sundhage to represent Brazil at the 2020 Summer Olympics.

In 2022, she was part of the squad which won the Copa América Feminina.

In 2023, Geyse was called up to the 2023 World Cup (in which Brazil exited in the group stage) and the inaugural Finalissima (in which Brazil finished as runners-up to England). Geyse was credited by media and manager Sundhage for her attacking threat.

Following the replacement of Sundhage with Arthur Elias, Geyse has received less call-ups to the national team. She was not involved with the Brazilian national team at the 2024 Summer Olympics, where they won silver, and made only five appearances across 2024 and 2025. She was called up in early 2026 for a series of friendlies.

== Personal life ==
Geyse gifted her mother and siblings a house with the money she earned from football. She has her mother's face tattooed on her left arm.

In January 2025, her brother, Geovanne, died.

Geyse is openly lesbian. In 2023, she issued a statement on X in which she vowed to "not remain silent in the face of prejudice" following homophobic attacks after she shared photos with her partner.

== Career statistics ==
=== Club ===
As of 18:39, 9 June 2026 (UTC)

Appearances and goals by club, season and competition
| Club | Season | League | | | National cup (Note: Includes the Copa de la Reina, Taça de Portugal and FA Cup.) | | League cup (Note: Includes the FA League Cup.) | | Continental (Note: Includes the UEFA Champions League and CONCACAF W Champions Cup.) | | Other | | Total | |
| Club | Season | Division | Apps | Goals | Apps | Goals | Apps | Goals | Apps | Goals | Apps | Goals | Apps | Goals |
|---|---|---|---|---|---|---|---|---|---|---|---|---|---|---|
| Centro Olímpico | 2016 | Campeonato Brasileiro | 2 | 0 | 0 | 0 | — | | — | | 0 | 0 | 2 | 0 |
| Corinthians | 2017 | Campeonato Brasileiro | 14 | 1 | 0 | 0 | — | | — | | 2 (Note: Campeonato Paulista) | 1 | 16 | 2 |
| Madrid CFF | 2017–18 | Primera División | 11 | 2 | — | | — | | — | | — | | 11 | 2 |
| Benfica | 2018–19 | Campeonato Nacional II | 21 | 42 | 8 | 9 | — | | — | | — | | 29 | 51 |
| Benfica | 2019–20 | Campeonato Nacional | 9 | 7 | 1 | 1 | — | | — | | — | | 10 | 8 |
| Benfica | Total | | 30 | 49 | 9 | 10 | 0 | 0 | 0 | 0 | 0 | 0 | 39 | 59 |
| Madrid CFF | 2019–20 | Primera División | 5 | 5 | 2 | 0 | — | | — | | — | | 7 | 5 |
| Madrid CFF | 2020–21 | Primera División | 26 | 9 | 2 | 1 | — | | — | | — | | 28 | 10 |
| Madrid CFF | 2021–22 | Primera División | 27 | 20 | 2 | 2 | — | | — | | — | | 29 | 22 |
| Madrid CFF | Total | | 58 | 34 | 6 | 3 | 0 | 0 | 0 | 0 | 0 | 0 | 64 | 37 |
| Barcelona | 2022–23 | Primera División | 24 | 6 | 0 | 0 | — | | 10 | 4 | 2 (Note: Supercopa de España) | 0 | 36 | 10 |
| Manchester United | 2023–24 | Women's Super League | 19 | 1 | 2 | 0 | 3 | 1 | 2 | 0 | — | | 26 | 2 |
| Manchester United | 2024–25 | Women's Super League | 9 | 1 | 2 | 0 | 2 | 0 | — | | — | | 13 | 1 |
| Manchester United | Total | | 28 | 2 | 4 | 0 | 5 | 1 | 2 | 0 | 0 | 0 | 39 | 3 |
| Gotham FC (loan) | 2025 | NWSL | 17 | 2 | — | | — | | 4 (Note: Two appearances and one goal in the 2024–25 competition, two appearances and one goal in the 2025–26 competition.) | 2 | 0 | 0 | 21 | 4 |
| Club América | 2026 | Liga MX | 16 | 9 | — | | — | | 2 | 2 | — | | 18 | 11 |
| Career total | | | 200 | 105 | 19 | 13 | 5 | 1 | 18 | 8 | 4 | 1 | 246 | 128 |

=== International ===
As of 10 October 2026

Appearances and goals by national team and year
| National team | Year | Apps | Goals |
|---|---|---|---|
| Brazil | 2017 | 1 | 0 |
| Brazil | 2018 | 1 | 0 |
| Brazil | 2019 | 10 | 0 |
| Brazil | 2020 | 0 | 0 |
| Brazil | 2021 | 11 | 2 |
| Brazil | 2022 | 16 | 3 |
| Brazil | 2023 | 12 | 1 |
| Brazil | 2024 | 5 | 2 |
| Brazil | 2026 | 1 | 0 |
| Total | | 58 | 9 |

As of 10 October 2026
Scores and results list Brazil's goal tally first, score column indicates score after each Geyse goal.

List of international goals scored by Geyse
| No. | Date | Venue | Opponent | Score | Result | Competition |
|---|---|---|---|---|---|---|
| 1 | 18 February 2021 | Exploria Stadium, Orlando, United States | Argentina | 4–1 | 4–1 | 2021 SheBelieves Cup |
| 2 | 26 November 2021 | Arena da Amazônia, Manaus, Brazil | India | 5–1 | 6–1 | 2021 Torneio Internacional |
| 3 | 7 April 2022 | Estadio José Rico Pérez, Alicante, Spain | Spain | 1–1 | 1–1 | Friendly |
| 4 | 21 July 2022 | Estadio Olímpico Pascual Guerrero, Cali, Colombia | Peru | 3–0 | 6–0 | 2022 Copa América |
| 5 | 2 September 2022 | Orlando Stadium, Johannesburg, South Africa | South Africa | 1–0 | 3–0 | Friendly |
| 6 | 2 July 2023 | Estádio Nacional Mané Garrincha, Brasília, Brazil | Chile | 4–0 | 4–0 | Friendly |
| 7 | 27 February 2024 | Snapdragon Stadium, San Diego, United States | Panama | 1–0 | 5–0 | 2024 CONCACAF W Gold Cup |
| 8 | 27 February 2024 | Snapdragon Stadium, San Diego, United States | Panama | 5–0 | 5–0 | 2024 CONCACAF W Gold Cup |
| 9 | 10 October 2026 | Estádio Beira-Rio, Porto Alegre, Brazil | Argentina | 2–0 | 3–1 | Friendly |

== Honours ==
Benfica

- Campeonato Nacional II Divisão Feminino: 2018–19
- Taça de Portugal: 2018–19
- Campeonato Nacional Feminino: 2019–20

Barcelona

- Primera División: 2022–23
- Supercopa de España: 2023
- UEFA Women's Champions League: 2022–23

Gotham FC

- NWSL Championship: 2025
- CONCACAF W Champions Cup: 2024–25

Manchester United

- Women's FA Cup: 2023–24

Club América

- Liga MX Femenil: Clausura 2026
- CONCACAF W Champions Cup: 2025–26

Brazil U20

- South American U-20 Women's Championship: 2018

Brazil

- Torneio Internacional de Futebol: 2021
- Copa América Femenina: 2022

Individual

- South American U-20 Women's Championship golden boot: 2018
- South American U-20 Women's Championship player of the tournament: 2018
- Primera División golden boot: 2021–22
- CONCACAF W Champions Cup Best XI: 2025–26
