= Ana Galindo (football manager) =

Mexican football player and manager

Personal information
- Full name: Ana Laura Galindo Domínguez
- Date of birth: 25 February 1985 (age 41)
- Place of birth: Coyoacán, Mexico
- Height: 1.62 m (5 ft 4 in)

Team information
- Current team: Club América (women) (Assistant)

Managerial career
- Years: Team
- 2017–2019: Club América (women) (Assistant)
- 2019–2020: Mexico U15 (women)
- 2021–2022: Mexico U17 (women)
- 2022: Mexico U17 (men) (Interim)
- 2022: Mexico U20 (women) (Interim)
- 2023–2024: Mexico U20 (women)
- 2025–: Club América (women) (Assistant)

Ana Laura Galindo Domínguez (born 25 February 1985) is a Mexican football manager. She is currently an assistant manager at Liga MX Femenil side Club América.

== Managerial career ==
=== Club América Femenil (2017–2019) ===
Ana Galindo was the assistant coach of Leonardo Cuéllar at Club América Femenil from 2017 to 2019. in this role, Galindo won the Apertura 2018 tournament with Club America.

=== Mexico U-15 women's national football team (2019–2020) ===
Ana Galindo became head coach of the Mexico women's national under-15 football team in 2019. During her stint managing the U-15 side she won the Dallas International Girls Cup 2019.

=== Mexico U-17 women's national football team (2021–2022) ===
Ana Galindo was named head coach of the Mexico women's national under-17 football team on 19 January 2021. Galindo coach the U-17 side during 2022 CONCACAF Women's U-17 Championship in which Mexico reached the tournament’s final, but lost it against the United States, and also during 2022 FIFA U-17 Women's World Cup, in which Mexico failed to advance out of the group stage.

Galindo left the team on late 2022 to take over as the permanent manager of the Mexico women’s U-20 national team

=== Mexico U-20 women's national football team (2022–2024) ===
After Mexico women's national under-20 football team manager Maribel Domínguez and her staff were suspended and separated from the team by the Mexican Football Federation, Galindo was named interim manager of the team on 21 July 2022, ahead of the upcoming 2022 U-20 Women's World Cup. Galindo was named permanent manager of the U-20 national team in early 2023. She would lead the team to win the 2023 CONCACAF Women's U-20 Championship that year. During the 2024 FIFA U-20 Women's World Cup, Galindo took the team to the round-of-16 of the competition, where Mexico would be eliminated by the United States in extra time.

Galindo left the U-20 team on 12 November 2024.

=== Club América Femenil (2025–2026) ===
Galindo returned to América in June 2025, as an assistant manager of head coach Ángel Villacampa.

== Honours ==
=== Assistant Coach ===
Club America Femenil

- Liga MX Femenil: Apertura 2018

=== Manager ===
Mexico U-15 women's national football team

- Dallas International Girls Cup 2019
