= Hugo Ruíz =

Mexican footballer (born 1977)

Personal information
- Full name: Hugo Ruíz Martín del Campo
- Date of birth: January 10, 1977 (age 49)
- Place of birth: San Luis Potosí, San Luis Potosí, Mexico
- Height: 1.67 m (5 ft 5 1/2 in)
- Position: Midfielder

Team information
- Current team: América U-19 (women) (Assistant)

Senior career*
Years	Team	Apps	(Gls)
2002–2003	Atlante	16	(1)
2003–2004	San Luis	9	(0)
2004–2005	Atlante Neza	18	(0)
2006–2007	Puebla	28	(4)
2008	Lobos BUAP	7	(0)
2008–2009	Tijuana	27	(2)
2009	Puebla	0	(0)
2009	Tijuana	2	(0)
2010–2011	Lobos BUAP	14	(0)

Managerial career
- 2013: Puebla Reserves and Academy
- 2015: América Reserves and Academy
- 2016–2017: América Premier (Assistant)
- 2018–2019: América Reserves and Academy
- 2019–2025: América (women) (Assistant)
- 2021: América (women) (Interim)
- 2025–: América U-20 (women) (Assistant)
- * Club domestic league appearances and goals as of 5 February 2010

Hugo Ruíz Martín del Campo (born January 10, 1977) is a retired Mexican footballer who last played for Lobos de la BUAP in the Liga de Ascenso.

== Career ==
In 2002, he began his career with club Atlante. He debuted against America in a 2-0 loss. He has played in clubs like Atlante, San Luis and Club Tijuana.
