= Irene Guerrero =

Spanish footballer (born 1996)

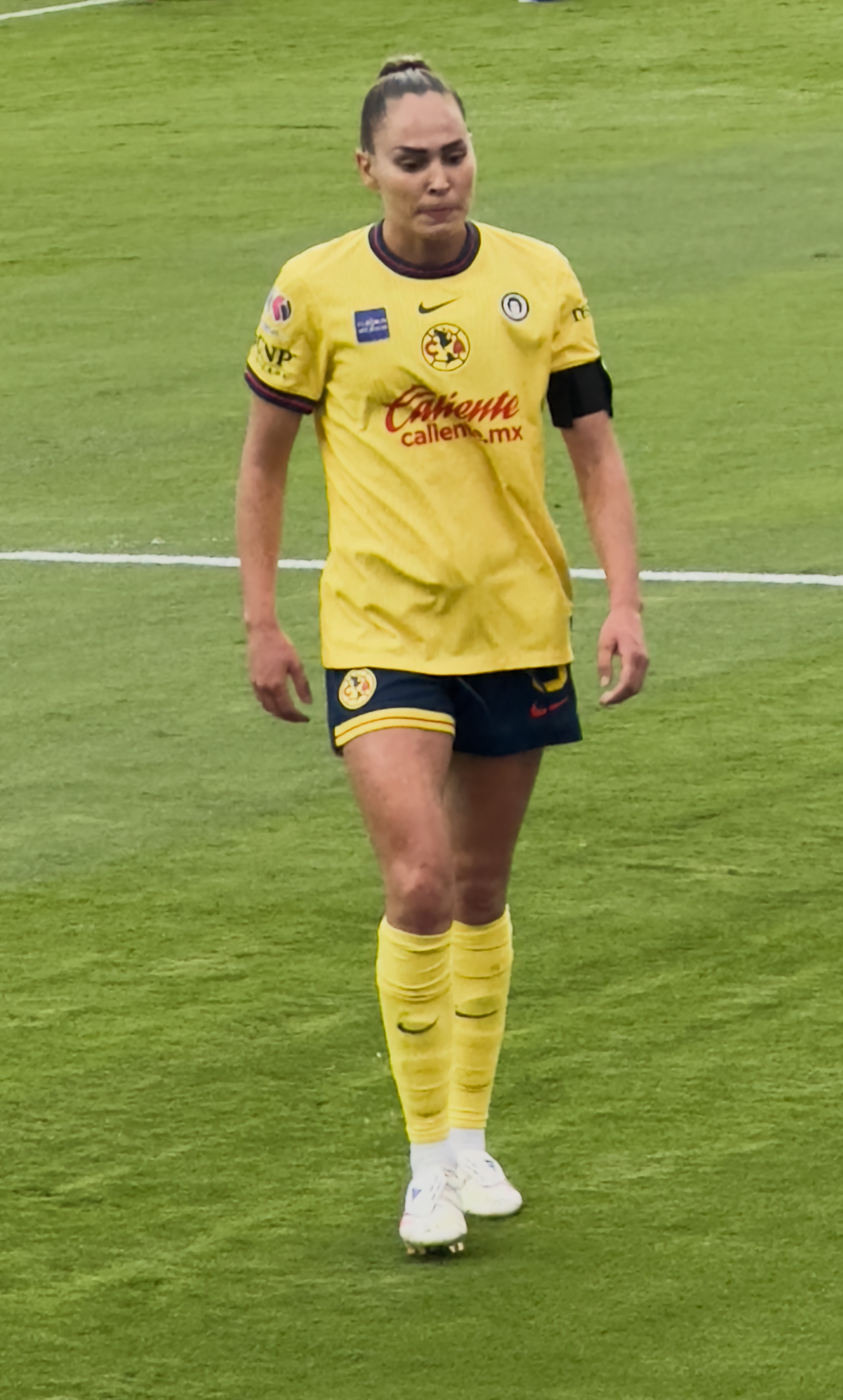
- Guerrero with América in 2025

Personal information
- Full name: Irene Guerrero Sanmartín
- Date of birth: 12 December 1996 (age 29)
- Place of birth: Seville, Spain
- Height: 1.68 m (5 ft 6 in)
- Position: Central midfielder

Team information
- Current team: América
- Number: 5

Senior career*
Years	Team	Apps	(Gls)
2012–2020	Betis	106	(6)
2020–2022	Levante	46	(4)
2022–2023	Atlético Madrid	23	(0)
2023–2024	Manchester United	3	(0)
2024–	América	81	(38)

International career^{‡}
2019–	Spain	26	(5)
Medal record
Women's football
Representing Spain
FIFA Women's World Cup
Winner	2023 Australia–New Zealand
- * Club domestic league appearances and goals as of 24 May 2026 ‡ National team caps and goals as of 11 August 2023

Irene Guerrero Sanmartín (born 12 December 1996) is a Spanish professional footballer who plays as a central midfielder for Liga MX Femenil side Club América and the Spain national team.

== Club career ==
=== Real Betis ===
In 2012, Guerrero joined the newly formed Real Betis, the club she grew up supporting. She made her senior debut with the team while playing in the second division. She made over 100 appearances for the club, helping earn promotion to the first division during the 2015–16 Segunda División. For the club's debut season in the 2016–17, Guerrero was named captain at the age of 19. She was the only player on the team to play in all 30 games and scored three goals at the team finished comfortably mid-table in 11th.

=== Levante ===
In 2020, Guerrero was recruited by her former Betis coach María Pry who had joined Levante UD the previous season. On 18 August 2021, she made her UEFA Women's Champions League debut during the first qualifying round, starting in a 2–1 victory over Celtic.

=== Atlético Madrid ===
She joined Atlético Madrid in June 2022. On 27 May 2023, Guerrero won her first competitive senior trophy as Atlético Madrid lifted the 2022–23 Copa de la Reina, beating rivals Real Madrid on penalties following a 2–2 draw. Guerrero was a 57th-minute substitute with Atlético trailing 2–0 and scored in the penalty shootout.

=== Manchester United ===
In September 2023, she signed for Manchester United. She made seven appearances in her time at the club.

=== Club América ===
On 18 July 2024, Guerrero signed for Liga MX Femenil side Club América.

On 17 May 2026, Guerrero scored the opening goal in a 3–0 victory over Monterrey in the second leg of the Clausura 2026 final, winning her first Liga MX Femenil championship (the club's third). Six days later, she scored the decisive go-ahead goal for América in the CONCACAF W Champions Cup final, winning 5–3 against the Washington Spirit to become continental champions.

== International career ==
Irene made her senior debut for Spain on 5 April 2019 as an 85th-minute substitute in a 2–1 friendly victory over Brazil. She scored her first international goal on 17 May 2019 on her second appearance as part of a 4–0 friendly victory over Cameroon. Guerrero was selected to represent Spain at UEFA Women's Euro 2022, making two appearances, once as a substitute and once as a starter. Spain reached the quarter-finals before being eliminated by England. The following summer she was named to the team for the 2023 FIFA Women's World Cup. Guerrero made three appearances, all as a substitute, as Spain won the tournament, beating England in the final. However, in the wake of the Rubiales affair, Guerrero was one of the 81 players who signed a letter denouncing abuse in the RFEF and saying they would boycott the national team until its leadership changed.

== Career statistics ==
=== Club ===
As of 13 July 2025

Appearances and goals by club, season and competition
Club	Season	League			National cup (Note: Includes the Copa de la Reina, Women's FA Cup and Campeón de Campeones)		League cup (Note: Includes the FA Women's League Cup)		Continental (Note: Includes the UEFA Women's Champions League and CONCACAF W Champions Cup)		Other (Note: Includes the Supercopa de España and NWSL x Liga MX Femenil Summer Cup)		Total	
Club	Season	Division	Apps	Goals	Apps	Goals	Apps	Goals	Apps	Goals	Apps	Goals	Apps	Goals
Real Betis	2012–13	Segunda División			—		—		—		—			
Real Betis	2013–14	Segunda División			—		—		—		—			
Real Betis	2014–15	Segunda División			—		—		—		—			
Real Betis	2015–16	Segunda División			—		—		—		—			
Real Betis	2016–17	Primera División	30	3	—		—		—		—		30	3
Real Betis	2017–18	Primera División	30	2	2	0	—		—		—		32	2
Real Betis	2018–19	Primera División	29	1	1	0	—		—		—		30	1
Real Betis	2019–20	Primera División	17	0	1	0	—		—		—		18	0
Real Betis	Total		106	6	4	0	0	0	0	0	0	0	110	6
Levante	2020–21	Primera División	19	3	1	0	—		—		2	0	22	3
Levante	2021–22	Primera División	27	1	2	0	—		4	0	1	0	34	1
Levante	Total		46	4	3	0	0	0	4	0	3	0	56	4
Atlético Madrid	2022–23	Liga F	23	0	3	0	—		—		—		26	0
Atlético Madrid	Total		23	0	3	0	—		—		—		26	0
Manchester United	2023–24	Women's Super League	3	0	3	0	1	0	0	0	—		7	0
Manchester United	Total		3	0	3	0	1	0	0	0	—		7	0
Club América	2024–25	Liga MX Femenil	40	14	0	0	—		6	3	2	0	48	17
Club América	Total		40	14	0	0	—		6	3	2	0	48	17
Career total			218	24	13	0	1	0	10	3	5	0	247	27

=== International ===
As of match played 11 August 2023

Appearances and goals by national team and year
National team	Year	Apps	Goals
Spain	2019	3	1
Spain	2020	3	0
Spain	2021	5	1
Spain	2022	7	2
Spain	2023	8	1
Total		26	5

As of 29 June 2023

Scores and results list Spain's goal tally first, score column indicates score after each Guerrero goal.

List of international goals scored by Irene Guerrero
No.	Date	Cap	Venue	Opponent	Score	Result	Competition
1	17 May 2019	2	Estadio Pedro Escartín, Guadalajara, Spain	Cameroon	1–0	4–0	Friendly
2	16 September 2021	7	Tórsvøllur, Tórshavn, Faroe Islands	Faroe Islands	2–0	10–0	2023 FIFA World Cup qualification
3	25 June 2022	13	Estadio Nuevo Colombino, Huelva, Spain	Australia	6–0	7–0	Friendly
4	25 June 2022	13	Estadio Nuevo Colombino, Huelva, Spain	Australia	7–0	7–0	Friendly
5	29 June 2023	23	Estadio Román Suárez Puerta, Avilés, Spain	Panama	4–0	7–0	Friendly

== Honours ==
Atlético Madrid

- Copa de la Reina: 2022–23

Manchester United

- Women's FA Cup: 2023–24

Club América

- Liga MX Femenil: Clausura 2026
- CONCACAF W Champions Cup: 2025–26

Spain

- FIFA Women's World Cup: 2023
