= Jana Gutiérrez =

Mexican footballer (born 2003)

Personal information
- Full name: Jana Alexandra Gutiérrez Campos
- Date of birth: 25 October 2003 (age 23)
- Place of birth: Mexico City, Mexico
- Height: 1.64 m (5 ft 5 in)
- Position: Defender

Team information
- Current team: América
- Number: 25

Youth career
- América

Senior career*
| Years | Team | Apps | (Gls) |
| 2017–2021 | América | 71 | (6) |
| 2021–2024 | UANL | 111 | (3) |
| 2024– | América | 76 | (5) |

International career^{‡}
| 2018 | Mexico U-17 | | |
| 2022 | Mexico U-20 | | |
| 2026– | Mexico | 1 | (0) |
- * Club domestic league appearances and goals as of 27 October 2026 ‡ National team caps and goals as of 2 September 2025

Jana Alexandra Gutiérrez Campos (born 25 October 2003) is a Mexican professional footballer who plays as a Defender for Liga Femenil side Club América and the Mexico women's national football team.

== Career ==
Gutiérrez was born in Mexico City on 25 October 2003.

Gutiérrez started her career in 2017 with América. Afterwards, she signed for UANL in 2021.

== International career ==
=== Youth ===
Gutiérrez was part of the Mexico women's national under-17 football team. She participated in the 2018 CONCACAF Women's U-17 Championship, where the Mexican squad were runners-up.

Gutiérrez was also part of the team that participated in the 2022 FIFA U-20 Women's World Cup in Costa Rica. She has also been part of the Mexico women's national under-23 football team.

=== Senior ===
Gutierrez was called to the senior national team for the first time on 30 September 2026 for two friendly games against Jamaica. She made her debut with Mexico on 13 October 2026, during the second friendly against Jamaica, coming into the game as a sub in the second half.

== Personal life ==
She is part of a football family: her father is Miguel "Jalisco" Gutiérrez, a former player for different first and second division teams in Mexico, while her older sister Jaidy Gutiérrez is also a football player that also plays for Club América.

== Honours ==
UANL

- Guard1anes 2021, Apertura 2022, Apertura 2023
- Campeón de Campeones: 2021, 2023

Club América

- Liga MX Femenil: Apertura 2018, Clausura 2026
- CONCACAF W Champions Cup: 2025–26

Mexico U-17

- CONCACAF Women's U-17 Championship: Runners-up: 2018
