= Ángel Villacampa =

Spanish football manager

Personal information
- Full name: Ángel Villacampa Carrasco
- Date of birth: 14 December 1976 (age 49)
- Place of birth: Toledo, Spain
- Height: 5 ft 6 in (1.68 m)

Team information
- Current team: América (women) (manager)

Managerial career
- Years: Team
- 2017–2018: Atlético Madrid (women)
- 2018–2019: China U-17 (women)
- 2019–2021: Athletic Club (women)
- 2021–2022: Levante (women)
- 2022–: América (women)

Ángel Villacampa Carrasco (born 14 December 1976) is a Spanish football manager who is the manager of Club América in the Liga MX Femenil since June 2022.

Between 2017 and 2019, Villacampa worked as a coach at the Atlético Madrid. In 2018, he was named the head coach of the China U-17 women's national team.

== Career ==
Villacampa was put in charge of the Atlético Madrid ahead of the 2017–18 season.

In 2018, Villacampa became the manager for the China U-17 women's national team.

In 2019, Villacampa was named the head coach of Athletic Club.

In 2021, Villacampa was named the head coach of Levante.

In 2022, Villacampa was appointed as manager of Club América in the Liga MX Femenil.

== Honours ==
=== Manager ===
Atlético Madrid

- Primera División: 2018

América

- Liga MX Femenil: Clausura 2023, Clausura 2026
- CONCACAF W Champions Cup: 2025–26
