= Club América (women) =

Mexican professional women's football club

América Femenil
- Full name: Club de Fútbol América S.A. de C.V. Femenil
- Nicknames: Las Águilas (The Eagles); Las Azul-Cremas (The Blue-Creams)
- Founded: December 5, 2016; 9 years ago
- Ground: Estadio Azteca; Estadio El Nido
- Capacity: 87,523 (Estadio Azteca); 5,000 (Estadio El Nido)
- Owner(s): Ollamani (51%); General Atlantic (49%)
- Manager: Ángel Villacampa
- League: Liga Femenil
- Clausura 2026: Regular phase: 1st Final phase: Champions
- Website: https://www.clubamerica.com.mx/
Home colours	Away colours

Club América Femenil, commonly known as América Femenil or simply América, is a Mexican professional women's football club based in Mexico City. It competes in the Liga Femenil and has been the women's section of Club América since 2016. The team plays its home games at the Estadio Azteca, with estadio El Nido, situated within their training grounds, serving as an alternative venue.

Regarded as one of the most competitive sides in Liga Femenil, Club América Femenil is one of only five clubs to have obtained the Liga MX Femenil title, achieving this feat three times, and the only Mexican women’s football club to win a continental trophy.

América Femenil main rival is Guadalajara. The matches between the two are known as El Clasico Nacional, and it is regarded as one of the most intense rivalries in Liga Femenil.

== History ==
=== Founding and first league tournament ===
Club América Femenil was founded on December 5, 2016, on the same day that Liga MX Femenil was announced. Former Mexico women's national football team manager, Leonardo Cuellar, was appointed as the first manager of the team in February 2017. In preparation for the first season of the Liga MX Femenil in the second half of 2017, the team participated in a preparation tournament, the 2017 Copa MX Femenil. The club first league match in history was a 1–0 victory against Tijuana on July 29, 2017.

In its first Liga MX Femenil tournament (Apertura 2017), América ended the regular phase of the tournament in 1st place with 35 points, but the team was eventually eliminated in the semi-finals of the playoffs by national rivals and eventual champions Guadalajara, in the first instance of the Clásico Nacional femenil between the two institutions.

América's starting line-up for the second leg of the Apertura 2018 final.

=== First title ===
América won its first league title in history by winning the Apertura 2018 tournament. During this tournament, América ended the regular phase in 3rd place with 35 points in the general standings and second in its group. In the playoffs, The team eliminated Toluca (5–3) in the quarter-finals, and Pachuca (1–0) in the semi-finals to reach the final against Tigres. América eventually won the final against Tigres on penalties (1–3) at Estadio Universitario after a 3–3 draw on aggregate (2–2 at the Estadio Azteca, 1–1 at the Estadio Universitario).

=== 2019 to 2023 ===
For the Clasura 2019 tournament, América once again had a great regular phase, ending in second place in the overall standings with 38 points, but was unable to achieve a second consecutive title after being eliminated by Tigres in the semi-finals of the playoffs.

Leo Cuellar decided to step down from the position of manager after 4 years in charge on March 27, 2021, after a 2–4 defeat at home against Guadalajara. Previous to this defeat, the team was coming from a string of very bad results and an overall irregular performance throughout the Guardianes 2021 tournament that put the team at risk of not qualifying to the playoffs for the first time. The club appointed Cuellar's assistant, Hugo Ruíz, as interim for the rest of the tournament. América ended-up qualifying to the playoffs by ending up in 8th place during the regular phase, nonetheless América's participation in the Guardianes 2021 tournament ended after being eliminated in the playoffs's quarter-finals by eventual champions Tigres.

On June 4, 2021, Craig Harrington was appointed by the club as the new manager of the team.

On July 18, 2021, the club announced the signing of American player Stephanie Ribeiro, the first foreign player to play for the team.

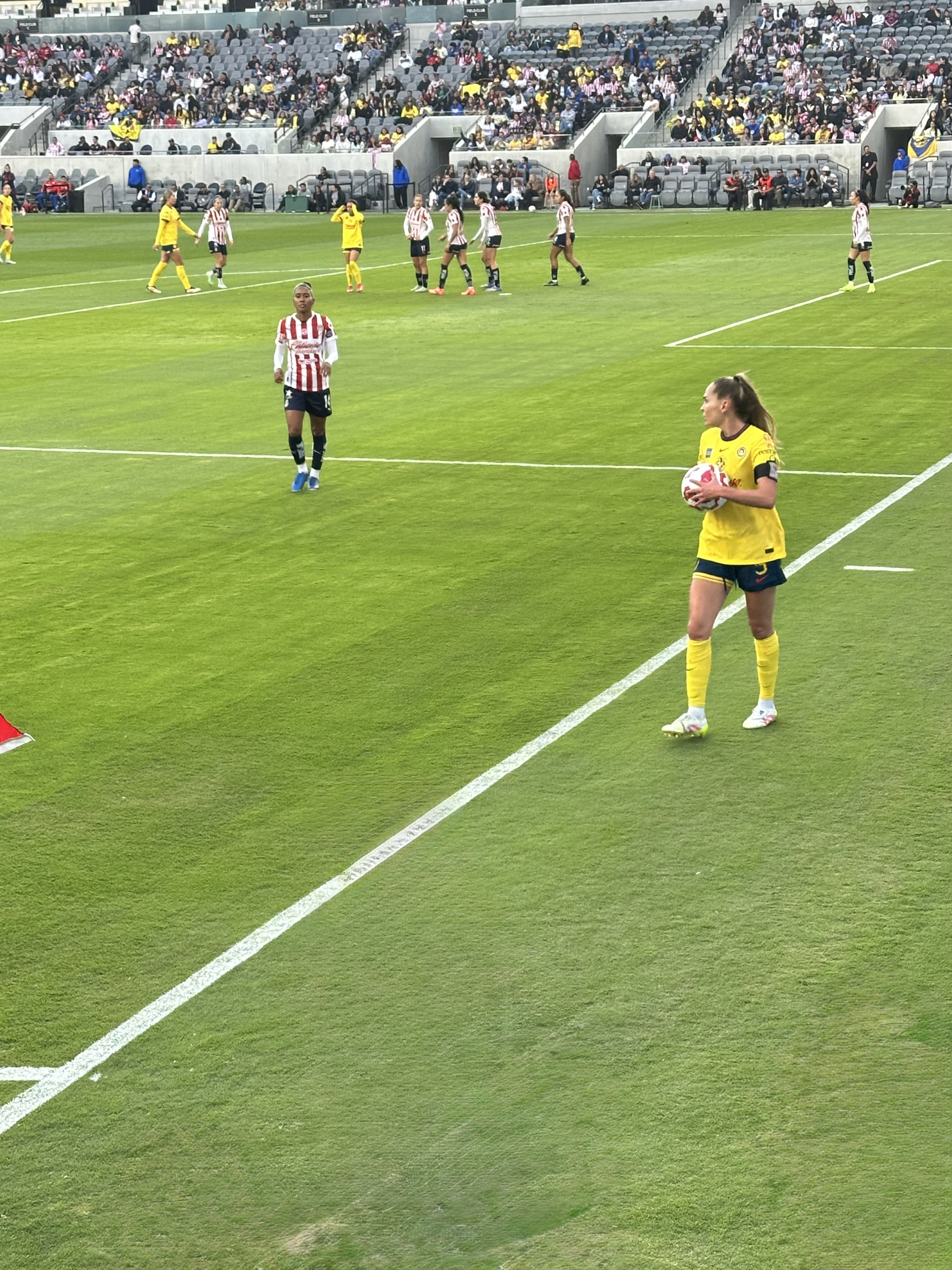
Club América Femenil playing against national rivals Guadalajara at the BMO Stadium in Los Angeles.

With Harrington as the new manager and with foreign players in the roster for the first time (Sarah Luebbert and Stephanie Ribeiro), América was able to have a better campaign during the Apertura 2021 tournament than in the previous Guardianes 2021 tournament. In this Apertura 2021 tournament, América ended the regular phase in 5th place with 31 points. In the playoffs, the team defeated national rivals Guadalajara in the quarter-finals (2–1), but they were once again eliminated by then current champions Tigres in the semi-finals with an aggregate score of 5–2.

After América's elimination against Pachuca in the quarter-finals of the playoffs of the Clausura 2022, the club decided to dismiss manager Craig Harrington on May 8, 2022, after just two tournaments due to the results that the team achieved throughout the regular season and in the playoffs of the Clausura 2022. For this Clausura 2022 tournament, América ended in fourth place during the regular season with 37 points.

On May 28, 2022, the América Femenil U-17 team became champions of the first Liga MX Femenil U-17 tournament (Clausura 2022) by winning the final against Santos on penalties at the Estadio Azteca after an aggregate scoreline of 3–3.

On June 17, 2022, the club announced Spanish manager Ángel Villacampa as the new manager of the team ahead of the Apertura 2022 tournament.

The team played its first international match against a European team when it faced Frauen-Bundesliga side Bayer 04 Leverkusen on July 5, 2022, at the Estadio Azteca. This match was also the first time that a Liga MX Femenil team played against a European team. The match ended in a 1–0 victory for América with a goal from Janelly Farías.

In August 2022, the club participated on its first international competition, the 2022 The Women's Cup. During this tournament, América defeated Tottenham Hotspur 2–1 on the quarter-finals to advance to the semifinals. On the semi-finals América was defeated 2–1 by OL Reign. América ended up winning third place of the tournament by winning the third place match 5–4 against A.C. Milan.

América returned to a Liga MX Femenil final after four years during the Apertura 2022 tournament. The team ended the regular phase of this tournament in 4th place with 36 points. In the Liguilla, América defeated Tijuana with a 3–0 aggregate score in the quarter-finals, and Guadalajara in the semi-finals with a 6–4 aggregate score. In the final, América faced Tigres once again, just as in the Apertura 2018 final. However, unlike the Apertura 2018 final, Tigres defeated América this time with a 3–0 aggregate score to crown themselves champions. The first match of this final at the Estadio Azteca broke the previous attendance record in the league after 52,654 people attended the game.

During the Clausura 2023, América reached the league final for the third time in history after finishing the regular phase of the tournament in third place with 37 points. In the liguilla, América eliminated Juárez in the quarterfinals, and Tigres in the semifinals. During this run, América's victory against Tigres at the Estadio Universitario was the first time that the team had won at that stadium. Additionally, América also ended Tigres's run of 54 consecutive matches without a loss at their home-ground. In the final, América faced Pachuca for the first time at this stage. América ended up obtaining the league title by defeating Pachuca with a 4–2 aggregate score in the final (1–2 at the Hidalgo and 2–1 at the Azteca). Additionally, the second match of this final broke the league's previous attendance record of 52,654 spectators which occurred during the previous tournament final, after 58,156 fans attended the game at the Estadio Azteca. América's campaign to win the Clausura 2023 league title was also the first time that a team in Mexican football (men & women) had won all their liguilla matches.

=== Multiple finals lost and historic treble (2023—present) ===

América initial line-up against Washington Spirit in the 2026 CONCACAF W Champions Cup final

After the successful Clausura 2023 tournament, América continued to reach the league’s final multiple times over the next two years, but losing all of them. During the Apertura 2023 tournament, América reached the final again, although the team was unable to defeat Tigres to whom they fell by a 3–0 aggregate score. During the Clausura 2024, América reached the final once again after having a very good regular season in which the team ended in the fourth place in the general standings. In the final, América was defeated by Monterrey on penalties after a dramatic second-leg, in which the Nuevo León side was able to send the championship game to penalties after scoring a goal in the last few seconds of the match to tie the aggregate score. América once again reached the league’s final during the Clausura 2025 tournament. During this tournament, América concluded their most successful regular phase campaign in history by ending first in the general standings for the first time. Nevertheless, the team suffered an injury crisis while pursuing the first place in the standings, including multiple ACL injuries. Despite this, América reached the league final, but the team was struck-down once again, this time by Pachuca after being unable to revert at home a 3–0 deficit obtained during the first-leg of the final. América losing streak in finals continued during the Apertura 2025 tournament. Despite América having a rather depleted roster at the time due to injuries from the previous season, the team concluded a good regular season campaign, ending on the third place in the general standings. In the playoffs, América had a rather easy pathway to the final but in the final the team once again fell short, this time against Tigres.

América’s losing streak on finals was finally broken during the Clausura 2026. During this tournament, the team had a very strong regular phase campaign, finishing first in the standings. In the playoffs, América was nearly knocked out early on by Juárez in a tough quarterfinal series that América won with a 4–3 aggregate score. During the semifinals, América swiftly defeated Toluca with a 10–3 aggregate score and in the final against Monterrey, América reversed at home an adversed 0–1 result obtained in the first-leg by defeating Monterrey with a 3–0 score, winning the Clausura 2023 championship and the third league title in the club history.

After winning the league championship, América quickly switched gears to compete against National Women's Soccer League side Gotham three days later in the semifinals of the 2025–26 CONCACAF W Champions Cup. In this match, América convincingly defeated Gotham by 4–1, with Scarlett Camberos and Geyse playing key roles during the match, with the former scoring a hat-trick and the latter giving three assists. In the final, América faced Washington Spirit in an intense match that América ended-up winning by 5–3, with Camberos and Geyse again playing important roles. By winning the 2025–26 CONCACAF W Champions Cup, América became the first Mexican women’s football club to win a continental competition and also qualified to the 2027 FIFA Women's Champions Cup, and 2028 FIFA Women's Club World Cup.

América championship winning streak continued during the 2026 Campeón de Campeonas championship, in which América defeated Tigres on penalties 4–3 to obtain its first Campeón de Campeonas title and third trophy in 2026. Due to the team performances in 2026, America Femenil was named as candidate to win the Women’s Club of the Year award at the 2026 Ballon d'Or—the first Mexican football club to appear in the candidates list of such award, and with team captain Scarlett Camberos also being nominated for the Ballon d'Or Féminin.

== Grounds ==
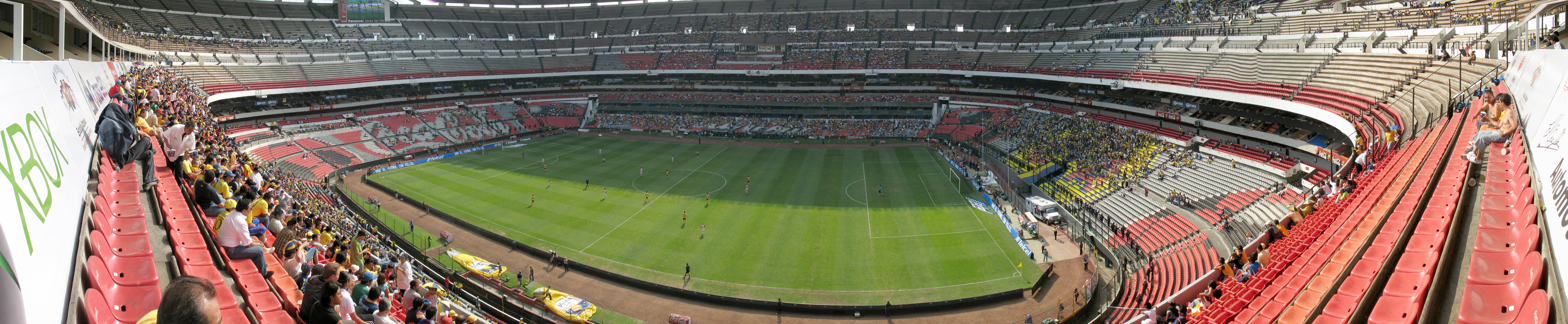
A panorama of the Estadio Azteca during a match

Club América Femenil plays its home games at the historic 81,700 seats Estadio Azteca, and at an alternative venue named El Nido (previously named Cancha Centenario) that is located at their trainings grounds, which has an estimated capacity for 5,000 people.

América Femenil played its first match in history at the Estadio Azteca on 19 August 2017, in a game against Monarcas Morelia for matchday 4 of the Apertura 2017. The game ended on 5–0 victory for América.

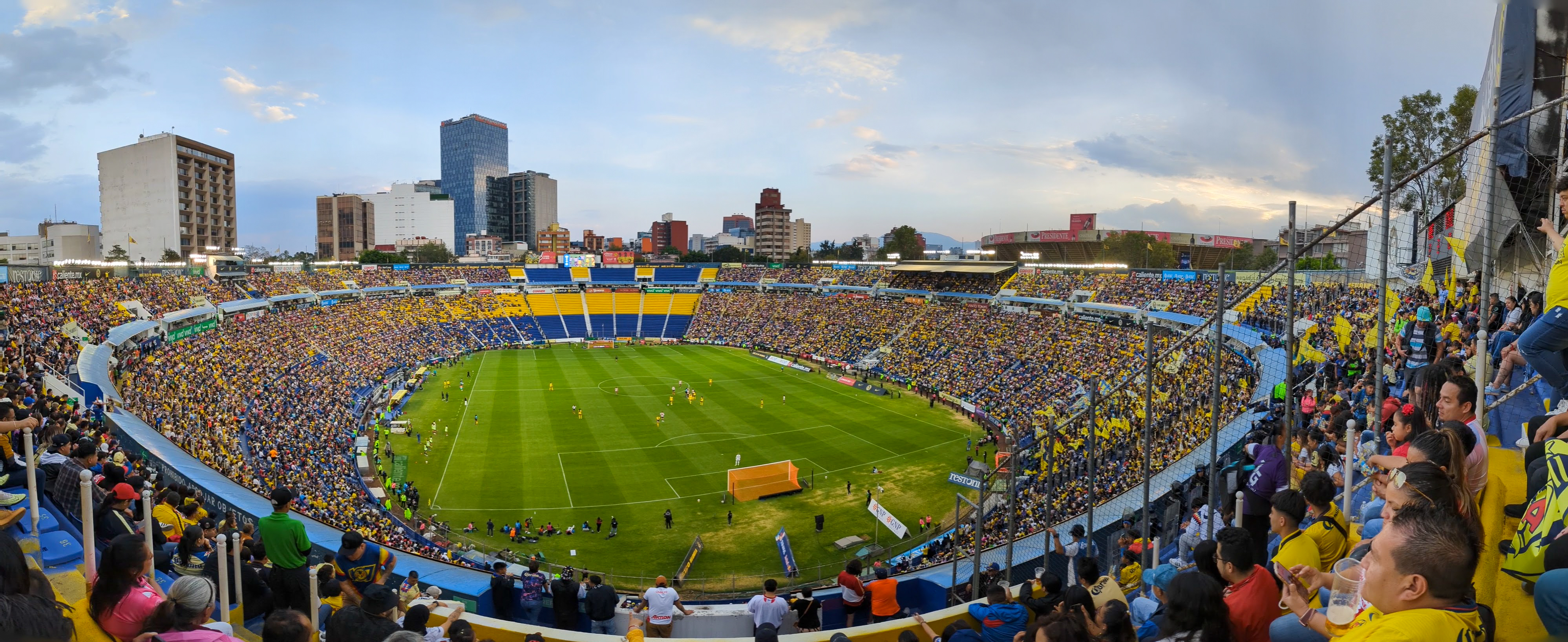
Estadio Cuidad de los Deportes served as America Femenil home venue while Estadio Azteca remodeling work was completed.

On 11 October 2023, América announced that the Cancha field located at their training grounds field would be expanded with the objective of converting it into a small stadium. The expansion of this field was in part due to the planned closure of the Estadio Azteca so that it could be remodeled in preparation for the 2026 FIFA Men's World Cup. Due to the remodeling of the Azteca for the 2026 FIFA Men's World Cup, América temporally played most of its home games at the Ciudad de los Deportes stadium while the remodeling work was completed. América Femenil returned to play at the Estadio Azteca during the Apertura 2026 tournament. The expansion of the Cancha Centenario field was finally completed on August 2026, converting it into a small capacity stadium of 5,000 seats, and renaming it to “El Nido”.

== Personnel ==
=== Club administration ===
Position	Staff
Chairman	(Mexico) Emilio Azcárraga Jean
President	(Mexico) Santiago Baños
Corporate director	(Mexico) Claudia Carrion
Sporting director	(Mexico) Lucia Rodriguez

=== Coaching staff ===
Position	Staff
Manager	(Spain) Ángel Villacampa
Assistant managers	(Mexico) Ana Galindo
Assistant managers	(Spain) Javier Ortega
Fitness trainers	(Spain) Juan Torres
Fitness trainers	(Spain) Sergio De Alba
Goalkeeper coach	(Mexico) Alexandro Álvarez
Video analyst	(Mexico) Rafael Almazán
Team doctor	(Mexico) Verónica Martínez
Team doctor assistants	(Mexico) Dannya Hernandez
Team doctor assistants	(Mexico) Emma Carmona
Team doctor assistants	(Mexico) Karla Barrera
Physiotherapist	(Spain) José Manuel Periáñez
Nutrionist	(Mexico) Miren Merino
Psychologist	(Mexico) Juan Carlos Pérez

== Managerial history ==
Name	Years	Notes
(Mexico) Leonardo Cuellar	2017–2021	
(Mexico) Hugo Ruíz	2021	Interim manager
(England) Craig Harrington	2021–2022	
(Spain) Ángel Villacampa	2022–	

== Players ==
=== Current squad ===
As of 26 July 2026
Note: Flags indicate national team as defined under FIFA eligibility rules; some limited exceptions apply. Players may hold more than one non-FIFA nationality.

No.	Pos.	Nation	Player
1	GK	MEX	Celeste Espino
2	DF	BRA	Isa Haas
3	DF	MEX	Karina Rodríguez
4	DF	MEX	Karol Bernal
5	MF	VEN	Gabriela García
6	FW	ESP	Bruna Vilamala
8	MF	ESP	Irene Guerrero
9	FW	BRA	Priscila
10	FW	MEX	Scarlett Camberos (captain)
11	MF	MEX	Aylín Aviléz
12	GK	MEX	Itzel Velasco
13	MF	MEX	Xcaret Pineda
14	MF	MEX	Alexa Soto

No.	Pos.	Nation	Player
15	DF	MEX	Kimberly Rodríguez
16	MF	MEX	Julie López
17	FW	BRA	Geyse
18	MF	MEX	Nancy Antonio
19	MF	MEX	Montserrat Saldívar
20	GK	MEX	Valentina Murrieta
22	MF	USA	Sarah Luebbert
23	GK	MEX	Jaidy Gutiérrez
24	FW	MEX	Alondra Cabanillas
25	MF	MEX	Jana Gutiérrez
26	DF	MEX	Karen Luna
28	DF	MEX	Sofía Ramos
30	FW	MEX	Giana Riley

=== Out on loan ===
No.	Pos.	Nation	Player
—	FW	MEX	Daniela Espinosa (at Toluca)

=== Records ===
Top goals scorers
Pos	Name	Goals	Years
1	(Mexico) Daniela Espinosa	84	2017–2022, 2025–present
2	(Mexico) Kiana Palacios	83	2021–2026
3	(Mexico) Katty Martínez	53	2022–2024
4	(Mexico) Scarlett Camberos	52	2022–2023, 2024–present
5	(Mexico) Casandra Cuevas	50	2017–2024
6	(Mexico) Lucero Cuevas	48	2017–2020
7	(United States) Sarah Luebbert	43	2021–2022, 2023–present
8	(Spain) Irene Guerrero	38	2024–present
9	(Mexico) Montserrat Saldívar	37	2021–present
10	(Mexico) Alison González	27	2022–2023

Most appearances
Pos	Name	appearances	Years
1	(Mexico) Casandra Cuevas	237	2017–2024
2	(Mexico) Daniela Espinosa	179	2017–2022, 2025–present
3	(Mexico) Jocelyn Orejel	163	2020–2025
4	(Mexico) Mónica Rodríguez	162	2017–2023
4	(Mexico) Kiana Palacios	162	2021–2026
5	(Mexico) Karen Luna	158	2021–present
6	(Mexico) Montserrat Hernández	157	2017–2023
7	(Mexico) Kimberly Rodríguez	153	2021–present
8	(United States) Sarah Luebbert	141	2021–2022, 2023–present
9	(Mexico) Natalia Mauleón	139	2021–2025
10	(Mexico) Nicolette Hernández	133	2022–2025

== Honors ==
=== Domestic ===
Competition	Titles	Winning years	Runners-up
Liga MX Femenil	3	Apertura 2018, Clausura 2023, Clausura 2026	Apertura 2022, Apertura 2023, Clausura 2024, Clausura 2025, Apertura 2025
Campeón de Campeonas	1	2026	2023

=== Continental ===
Competition	Titles	Winning years	Runners-up
CONCACAF W Champions Cup	1^{s}	2025–26	—

Notes

- record
- ^{s} shared record

=== Friendly ===
- State Fair of Texas Clasico: 2025

== See also ==
- Club América
