= Scarlett Camberos =

Mexican footballer (born 2000)

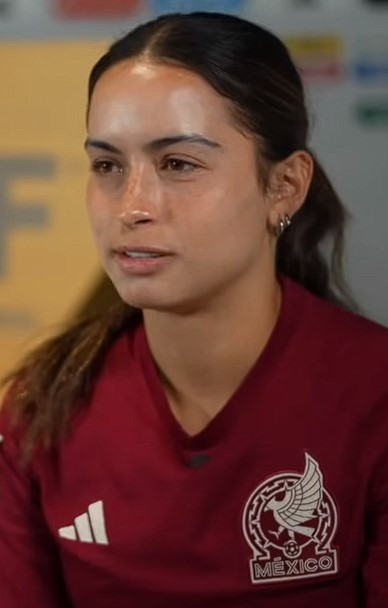
- Camberos in 2023

Personal information
- Full name: Scarlett Nefer Camberos Becerra
- Date of birth: 20 November 2000 (age 25)
- Place of birth: San Diego, California, U.S.
- Height: 1.68 m (5 ft 6 in)
- Position: Winger

Team information
- Current team: América
- Number: 10

College career
Years	Team	Apps	(Gls)
2018–2021	UC Irvine Anteaters	57	(17)

Senior career*
Years	Team	Apps	(Gls)
2019	San Diego Parceiro Ladies		
2022–2023	América	41	(18)
2023	Angel City	19	(1)
2024	Bay FC	10	(1)
2024–	América	83	(37)

International career^{‡}
2022–	Mexico	32	(7)
Medal record
Women's football
Representing Mexico
Pan American Games
Gold medal – first place	2023 Santiago	Team
- * Club domestic league appearances and goals as of 26 October 2026 ‡ National team caps and goals as of 26 October 2026

Scarlett Nefer Camberos Becerra (born 20 November 2000) is a professional footballer who plays as a forward for Liga MX Femenil side Club América. Born in the United States, she plays for the Mexico national team. She played college soccer for the UC Irvine Anteaters. She also previously played for Angel City FC and Bay FC of the National Women's Soccer League (NWSL).

== College career ==
Camberos played college soccer for the UC Irvine Anteaters women's soccer team from 2018 to 2021. She scored 13 goals and 7 assists in 22 appearances during her senior-year, including two hat-tricks. Due to her performance during her senior year, Camberos received the Big West Conference Offensive Player of the Year award.

== Club career ==
Prior to joining Club América, Camberos played in 2019 for San Diego Parceiro Ladies of the Women's Premier Soccer League (WPSL).

=== Club América (2022–2023) ===
In 2021, Camberos registered her name in the 2022 NWSL Draft, but she was not signed by any club. Camberos ended up signing her first professional contract with Club América of Liga MX Femenil on 30 December 2021, and made her professional debut with the team in January 2022 in a match against Atlas. Born in San Diego, California, Camberos credited her father's lifelong affinity for Club América in her decision to pursue a contract with the team.

She scored 11 goals in 16 appearances during the Clausura 2022, finishing tied for third place with Stephany Mayor among all players in goals scored during the tournament, and leading Club América in scoring.

On 25 July 2022, Camberos publicly accused a fan of harassing her via false social media accounts and in person. Other Liga MX Femenil players joined her in talking about the harassment they regularly experience.

In August 2022, Camberos participated in the 2022 The Women's Cup international club friendly tournament with Club América. She was named player of the match for her performance in América's win against Tottenham Hotspur in which she scored the match-winning goal.

During the Apertura 2022 tournament, Camberos was a key player for América to return to a league final once again after four years, with noteworthy performances in the Liguilla phase of the tournament, with the most notable being her performance during the semi-final series against Chivas in which she gave two assists and scored one goal.

On 21 March 2023, Club América announced that Camberos would continue her career with NWSL side Angel City after Camberos requested the club to transfer her out due to safety reasons following multiple stalking and online-harassment incidents against her by a male fan, and the lack of guarantees by the Mexican authorities, who were only able to execute a 36 hours house arrest against the harasser due to lack of regulation in Mexico's penalty code when it comes to harassment and stalking. In turn, Club América invited Mexican legislators to enact more strict laws against online-harassment, stalking, and gender-based violence. Camberos' sudden exit from Club América and Liga MX Femenil due to the constant harassment she received made headlines in Mexico, and was seen by commentators as an example of the violence that women in Mexico have faced for years. At the time of her exit, Camberos was considered to be Club America's best player, the captain of the team, as well as one of the best players in Liga MX Femenil.

=== Angel City (2023) ===
Camberos was officially announced by Angel City as their new player on 29 March 2023, after paying a transfer fee to Club América. Camberos signed a two-year contract with the team.

Scarlett Camberos made her team debut on April 2 coming on as a 67th-minute substitute in a 2–1 win versus Orlando Pride. In the last game of the season, Scarlett scored her first and only goal of the season in a 5–1 win over Portland Thorns that helped Angel City clinch their first ever playoff spot.

=== Bay FC (2024) ===
On December 12, 2023, Angel City announced they would be trading Camberos to NWSL expansion team Bay FC in exchange for $50,000 in allocation money and draft protection. Scarlett Camberos made her Bay FC season debut on March 17 against her former team, Angel City. Camberos started the game and played 66 minutes in Bay FC's 1–0 win. On May 17, Scarlett scored her first Bay FC goal in the 55th minute of a 2–1 win over San Diego Wave. Her right footed shot from 15 yards out leveled the game 1-1, before an own goal gave Bay FC the win. This helped snap their 5-game losing streak.

=== Club América (2024–present) ===
On 15 July 2024, Bay FC announced that it reached an agreement with Club América to transfer Camberos to her former club for an undisclosed transfer fee.

On 17 May 2026, Camberos scored a penalty in the 3–0 victory over Monterrey in the second leg of the Clausura 2026 final, winning her first Liga MX Femenil championship (the club's third) and raising the trophy as team captain. Three days later, she scored a hat trick in a 4–1 win over Gotham FC in the CONCACAF W Champions Cup semifinals. In the final, she assisted twice and scored the last goal as América won 5–3 over the Washington Spirit, becoming continental champions. She was named the tournament's Best Player having set a record with 9 goal contributions in the competition.

Due to her performances throughout the 2025–26 season with América, Camberos was named as one of the 30 candidates to the 2026 Ballon d'Or Féminin, the first Mexican women player to be named as candidate to that award. Camberos finished 21st in the candidate rankings.

== International career ==
Camberos was first selected to the Mexico women's national football team on 25 August 2022, for friendlies scheduled against Angel City FC of the National Women's Soccer League and the New Zealand women's national football team in September 2022. She made her debut with Mexico in the match against New Zealand and scored her first goal with the team in the match against Angel City.

Camberos was selected to represent Mexico at the 2023 Pan American Games held in Santiago, Chile, where the Mexican squad went undefeated to win the gold medal for the first time in their history at the Pan American Games, defeating Chile 1–0.

== Career statistics ==
=== Club ===
As of match played 13 July 2025

Club	Season	League			Playoffs (Note: Includes NWSL Playoffs and Liga MX Femenil Liguilla phase)		Cup (Note: Includes NWSL Challenge Cup)		League cup (Note: Includes Summer Cup)		Continental (Note: Includes CONCACAF W Champions Cup)		Total	
Club	Season	Division	Apps	Goals	Apps	Goals	Apps	Goals	Apps	Goals	Apps	Goals	Apps	Goals
Club América	2021–22	Liga MX Femenil	16	11	1	0	—		—		—		17	11
Club América	2022–23	Liga MX Femenil	18	5	6	2	—		—		—		24	7
Angel City FC	2023	NWSL	19	1	1	0	6	1	—		—		26	2
Bay FC	2024	NWSL	10	1	—		—		—		—		10	1
Club América	2024–25	Liga MX Femenil	23	11	10	3	—		3	1	5	1	41	16
Career total			86	29	12	5	6	1	3	1	5	1	118	37

=== International ===
As of match played 2 December 2025

Appearances and goals by national team and year
National team	Year	Apps	Goals
Mexico	2022	2	0
Mexico	2023	11	2
Mexico	2024	7	1
Mexico	2025	6	2
Total		26	5

List of international goals scored by Scarlett Camberos
No.	Date	Venue	Opponent	Score	Result	Competition
1	22 September 2023	Estadio Azteca, Mexico City, Mexico	Puerto Rico	2–1	2–1	2024 CONCACAF W Gold Cup qualification
2	28 October 2023	Estadio Sausalito, Viña del Mar, Chile	Paraguay	1–1	4–1	2023 Pan American Games
3	30 November 2024	Estadio Andrés Quintana Roo, Cancún, Mexico	Costa Rica	2–0	4–1	Friendly
4	8 April 2025	Shell Energy Stadium, Houston, United States	Jamaica	3–0	4–0	Friendly
5	29 November 2025	Arnos Vale Stadium, Kingstown, Saint Vincent and the Grenadines	Saint Vincent and the Grenadines	4–0	14–0	2026 CONCACAF W Championship qualification
6	10 April 2026	Estadio Carlos Vega Villalba, Zacatecas, Mexico	U.S. Virgin Islands	7–0	9–0	2026 CONCACAF W Championship qualification
7	18 April 2026	Estadio Nemesio Díez, Toluca, Mexico	Puerto Rico	3–0	6–0	2026 CONCACAF W Championship qualification

== Honours ==
Club América

- Liga MX Femenil: Clausura 2026
- Campeón de Campeonas: 2026
- CONCACAF W Champions Cup: 2025–26

Individual

- CONCACAF W Champions Cup Best Player: 2025–26
- CONCACAF W Champions Cup Best XI: 2025–26
