= Craig Harrington =

English football manager

Personal information
- Full name: Craig Neil Harrington
- Date of birth: 20 December 1982 (age 43)
- Place of birth: Hillingdon, Middlesex, England
- Height: 6 ft 2 in (1.88 m)

Youth career
- Years: Team
- Oxford United
- Swindon Town

Managerial career
- 2013–2016: Turks and Caicos
- 2018–2019: Chicago Red Stars (assistant)
- 2020: Utah Royals FC
- 2021–2022: América (women)

Craig Neil Harrington (born 20 December 1982) is an English football manager who most recently was director of coaching for Chicago Empire FC in the Illinois Women's Soccer League (IWSL).

Between 2010 and 2013, Harrington worked as a coach at the LA Galaxy Academy. In December 2013, he was named the technical Director and head coach of the Turks and Caicos national football team.

== Career ==
Harrington was put in charge of the Turks and Caicos national football team ahead of the 2014 Caribbean Cup qualification campaign.

In 2018, Harrington became an assistant coach of Chicago Red Stars of the National Women's Soccer League.

On 7 February 2020 Harrington was named the head coach of Utah Royals FC in the National Women's Soccer League. On 9 November 2020 the Salt Lake Tribune reported sources saying that Harrington was placed on leave after players complained he was being “verbally abusive,” a charge Harrington denied. Harrington and the club parted ways.

In April 2021, former Red Stars youth affiliate Chicago Empire FC of the IWSL hired Harrington as its technical director.

On 4 June 2021 Harrington was appointed as manager of Club América in the Liga MX Femenil. Harrington was immediately fired after the team was eliminated in the quarter-finals by Club Pachuca in May 2022.

On 9 January 2023, Harrington was given a two-year ban from the NWSL for his abusive conduct in his coaching career, with future employment in the league conditional on meeting a set of requirements.

Later in January 2023, Empire FC re-hired Harrington as an independent contractor for a role listed on its website as director of coaching, despite Harrington being suspended from youth soccer participation in Illinois by the Illinois Youth Soccer Association (IYSA) for the same period as the NWSL's suspension. IYSA investigated Harrington's employment upon learning about it, and after confirming it communicated on April 25 Harrington's disqualification to him, Empire FC, the IWSL, the United States Youth Soccer Association, and the United States Soccer Federation.

Hours after a report published on 5 May 2023 in The Athletic publicized Harrington's employment at Empire FC, the Red Stars fired its general manager Michelle Lomnicki, who had been a staff coach for two girls' teams at Empire FC prior to being named the Red Stars's general manager in January 2023, and whose husband is Empire FC's sporting director. The Red Stars published a statement claiming Lomnicki was fired for a "lapse in judgment to not share important information with club leadership".
