= 2025–26 CONCACAF W Champions Cup =

2nd season of CONCACAF women's club football tournament

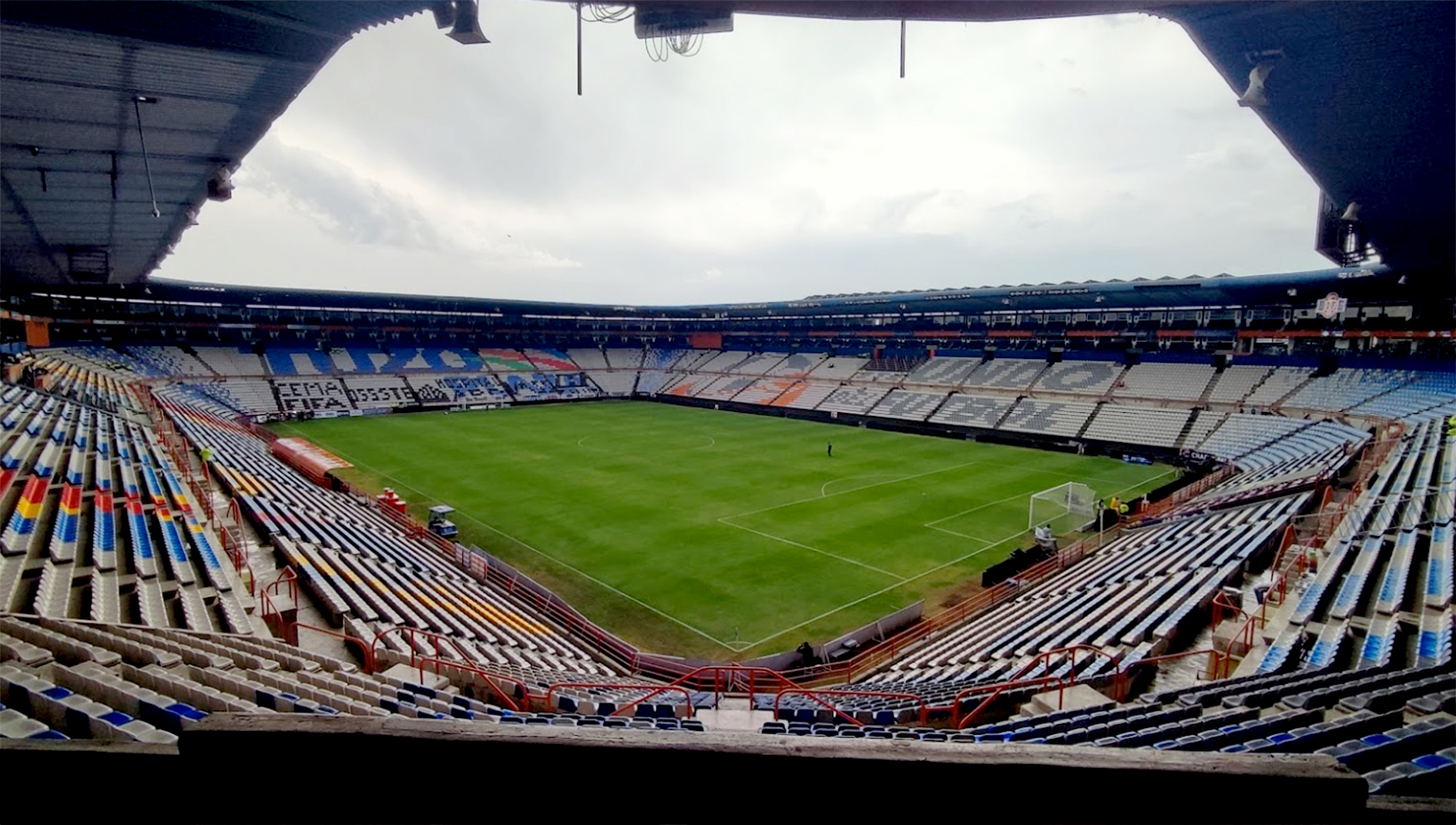
- Estadio Hidalgo served as the venue for the final four of the tournament

Tournament details
- Dates: 19 August 2025 – 23 May 2026
- Teams: 10 (from 6 associations)

Final positions
- Champions: (Mexico) América (1st title)
- Runners-up: (United States) Washington Spirit
- Third place: (Mexico) Pachuca
- Fourth place: (United States) Gotham FC

Tournament statistics
- Matches played: 22
- Goals scored: 96 (4.36 per match)
- Top scorer(s): (Ivory Coast) Rosemonde Kouassi (Washington Spirit); 6 goals
- Best player: (Mexico) Scarlett Camberos (América)
- Best young player: (Mexico) Montserrat Saldívar (América)
- Best goalkeeper: (Mexico) Itzel Velasco (América)
- Fair play award: (United States) Washington Spirit

The 2025–26 CONCACAF W Champions Cup was the second season of the CONCACAF W Champions Cup, the annual continental women's football club competition organized by CONCACAF. On 12 May 2025, CONCACAF released key details of the competition, including a reduction in the number of teams from 11 to 10 and the elimination of the preliminary round.

The competition began in August 2025. Gotham FC were the defending champions, having defeated Tigres UANL 1–0 in the inaugural final, but were eliminated in the semi-finals after losing 4–1 to América. In the 2026 final, held on 23 May, América triumphed over the Washington Spirit 5–3 to win their first title.

== Format ==
The second edition of the CONCACAF W Champions Cup featured ten teams from six CONCACAF member associations. Teams were split into two groups of five teams. Teams faced each other in a single round-robin format, with each team playing two matches at home and two matches away in August, September, and October 2025. The top two clubs from each group advanced to the knockout stage, played at a centralized location in May 2026. The knockout stage featured semi-finals, a third place play-off and a final to determine the champions of the competition. The champions qualified for the 2027 FIFA Women's Champions Cup and 2028 FIFA Women's Club World Cup.

=== Tiebreakers ===
Teams in the group stage were ranked according to points (3 points for a win, 1 point for a draw, 0 points for a loss). If two or more teams were equal on points, the following tiebreaking criteria were applied, in the order given, to determine their rankings:

1. Goal difference in all group matches;
2. Goals scored in all group matches;
3. Points in head-to-head matches among the tied teams;
4. Goal difference in head-to-head matches among the tied teams;
5. Goals scored in head-to-head matches among the tied teams;
6. Lower number of disciplinary points (single yellow card = 1 point, double yellow card = 3 points, direct red card = 4 points, direct red card after single yellow card = 5 points);
7. Drawing of lots.

== Association team allocation ==
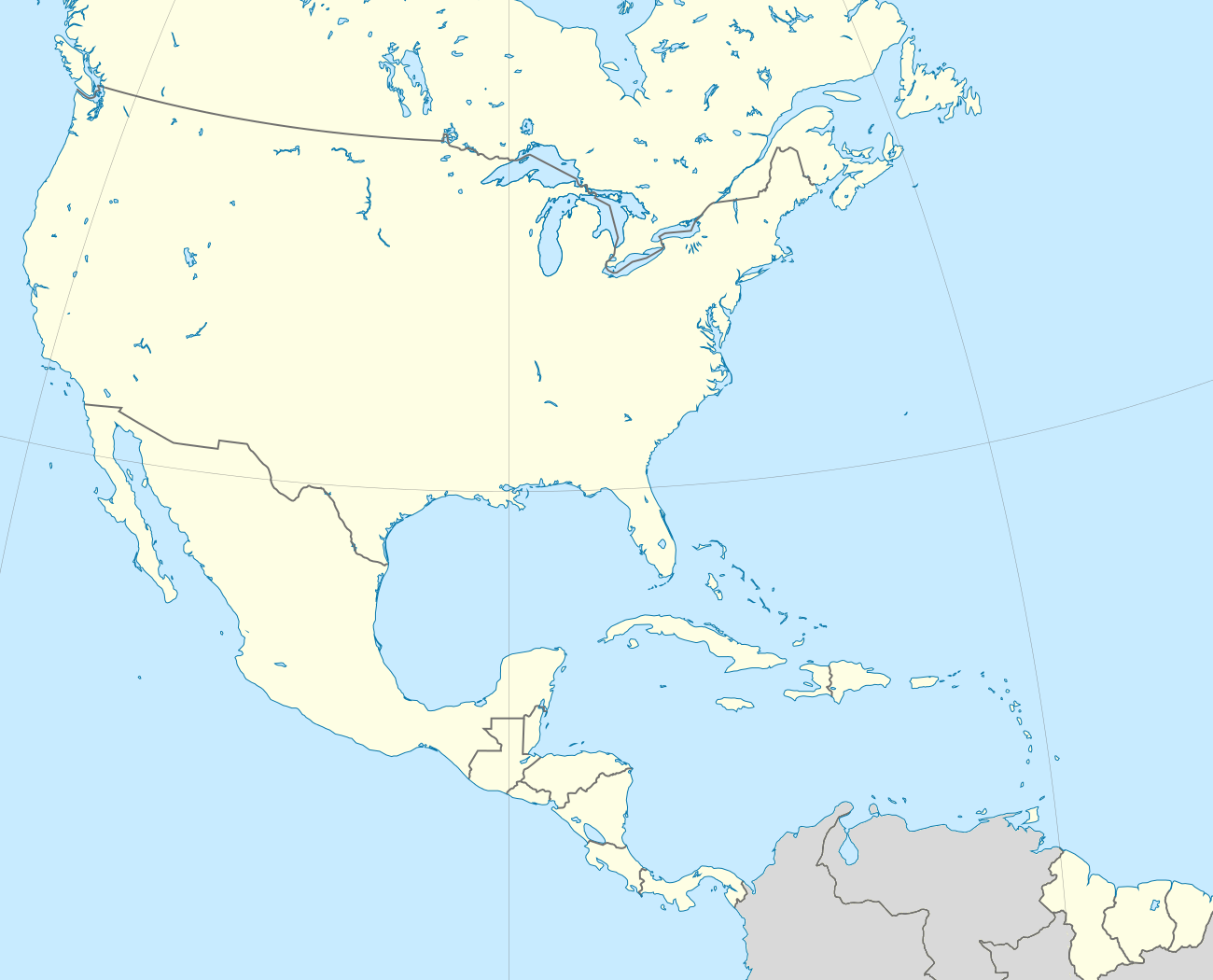
Location of teams of the 2025–26 CONCACAF W Champions Cup
North American Zone Central American Zone

CONCACAF allocated spots to six of their member associations, based on eligibility criteria. Each association had one spot in the tournament, with the exception of Mexico and the United States, which had three each.

=== Distribution ===
The following was the access list for the 2025–26 tournament.

Access list for 2025–26 CONCACAF W Champions Cup
Member association	Slots
Mexico	3
United States	3
Canada	1
Costa Rica	1
El Salvador	1
Panama	1
Participating associations: 6	10

=== Teams ===
Teams qualified through their domestic leagues based on sporting merit. The qualification criteria were proposed by each member association and ratified by CONCACAF.

Qualified teams for 2025–26 CONCACAF W Champions Cup
Association	Team	Qualification method	App. (last)	Previous best (last)
Canada (1 berth)	Vancouver Rise Academy	2024 League1 Canada Inter-Provincial Championship champions	2nd (2024–25)	Group stage (2024–25)
Costa Rica (1 berth)	Alajuelense	2024 Costa Rican Women's Premier Division Apertura and Clausura champions	2nd (2024–25)	Group stage (2024–25)
El Salvador (1 berth)	Alianza	2024–25 Primera División Femenina de El Salvador Apertura and Clausura champions	2nd (2024–25)	Preliminary round (2024–25)
Mexico (3 berths)	Monterrey	2024–25 Liga MX Femenil Apertura champions	2nd (2024–25)	Group stage (2024–25)
Mexico (3 berths)	Pachuca	2024–25 Liga MX Femenil Clausura champions	1st	Debut
Mexico (3 berths)	América	Best runners-up of the 2024–25 Liga MX Femenil season based on accumulated points during the regular phase	2nd (2024–25)	Fourth place (2024–25)
Panama (1 berth)	Chorrillo	Winner of the 2024 Clausura and 2025 Apertura Champions play-off	1st	Debut
United States (3 berths)	Orlando Pride	2024 National Women's Soccer League champions and 2024 National Women's Soccer League Shield winners	1st	Debut
United States (3 berths)	Washington Spirit	2024 National Women's Soccer League Shield runners-up	1st	Debut
United States (3 berths)	Gotham FC	Third best club in 2024 National Women's Soccer League Shield standings	2nd (2024–25)	Champions (2024–25)

1. Mexico (MEX): América was semifinalist in 2024–25 Apertura and runners-up in 2024–25 Clausura.
2. United States (USA): With Orlando Pride winning both the 2024 National Women's Soccer League Championship and 2024 National Women's Soccer League Shield, the third qualifying spot for the United States went to the next best club in 2024 National Women's Soccer League Shield standings not already qualified, Gotham FC.

=== Seeding ===
The seeding for the tournament was confirmed on 2 June 2025. Teams were split into five pots based on the CONCACAF Women's Club Rankings.

Pot	Team	Pts
1	(United States) Gotham FC	2,500.25
1	(Mexico) América	1,630.15
2	(United States) Orlando Pride	1,320.07
2	(United States) Washington Spirit	1,320.07
3	(Mexico) Pachuca	1,120.08
3	(Mexico) Monterrey	1,120.08
4	(Costa Rica) Alajuelense	680.06
4	(Canada) Vancouver Rise Academy	630.02
5	(Panama) Chorrillo	355.02
5	(El Salvador) Alianza	0

=== Draw ===
The draw for the group stage was held on 3 June 2025 at 20:00 EDT (UTC−4). The draw began by randomly selecting a team from Pot 1, placing them into Group A and then selecting the remaining team from Pot 1 and placing them into Group B. It then continued with the same procedure for the remaining pots.

== Schedule ==
The schedule of the competition was as follows.

Schedule for 2025–26 CONCACAF W Champions Cup
Phase	Round	Match date
Group stage	Matchday 1	19–20 August 2025
Group stage	Matchday 2	2–3 September 2025
Group stage	Matchday 3	16–18 September 2025
Group stage	Matchday 4	30 September – 2 October 2025
Group stage	Matchday 5	14–16 October 2025
Knockout stage	Semi-finals	20 May 2026
Knockout stage	Third place play-off	20 May 2026
Knockout stage	Final	23 May 2026

== Group stage ==
=== Group A ===
Pos	Team	Pld	W	D	L	GF	GA	GD	Pts	Qualification	AME	PAC	ORL	ALA	CHO
1	(Mexico) América	4	3	1	0	12	0	+12	10	Advance to knockout stage	—	1–0	2–0	—	—
2	(Mexico) Pachuca	4	2	1	1	12	2	+10	7	Advance to knockout stage	—	—	—	5–0	6–0
3	(United States) Orlando Pride	4	2	1	1	9	3	+6	7		—	1–1	—	3–0	—
4	(Costa Rica) Alajuelense	4	1	1	2	1	8	−7	4		0–0	—	—	—	1–0
5	(Panama) Chorrillo	4	0	0	4	0	21	−21	0		0–9	—	0–5	—	—

Source: CONCACAF
Rules for classification: Tiebreakers
19 August 2025
20:00 UTC−6

Pachuca (Mexico)	6–0	(Panama) Chorrillo
Orejel 19'; Mauleón 22'; García 52'; Ihezuo 68'; Nicosia 83', 86'	Report

Estadio Hidalgo, Pachuca
Referee: Deily Gómez (Costa Rica)
20 August 2025
20:00 UTC−6

Alajuelense (Costa Rica)	0–0	(Mexico) América
	Report

Estadio Alejandro Morera Soto, Alajuela
Attendance: 813
Referee: Dilia Bradley (Guatemala)
2 September 2025
19:00 UTC−4

Orlando Pride (United States)	3–0	(Costa Rica) Alajuelense
Doyle 49'; Pickett 64'; Jackson 81'	Report

Inter&Co Stadium, Orlando
Attendance: 1,710
Referee: Janeishka Caban (Puerto Rico
3 September 2025
20:00 UTC−5

Chorrillo (Panama)	0–9	(Mexico) América
	Report	Palacios 14', 88'; Vilamala 28', 37'; Saldivar 38'; Guerrero 43', 55', 68'; Camberos 77'

Rommel Fernández Stadium, Panama City
Attendance: 179
Referee: Vimarest Díaz (Dominican Republic)
16 September 2025
19:00 UTC−5

Chorrillo (Panama)	0–5	(United States) Orlando Pride
	Report	Doyle 4'; Yates 6', 22', 57' (pen.); Lemos 84'

Rommel Fernández Stadium, Panama City
Attendance: 179
Referee: Priscila Pérez (Mexico)
18 September 2025
19:00 UTC−6

América (Mexico)	1–0	(Mexico) Pachuca
Camberos 19'	Report

Estadio Ciudad de los Deportes, Mexico City
Attendance: 1,650
Referee: Alyssa Pennington (United States)
30 September 2025
19:00 UTC−6

América (Mexico)	2–0	(United States) Orlando Pride
Palacios 7'; Gutiérrez 79'	Report

Estadio Ciudad de los Deportes, Mexico City
Attendance: 3,866
Referee: Odette Hamilton (Jamaica)
1 October 2025
19:00 UTC−6

Pachuca (Mexico)	5–0	(Costa Rica) Alajuelense
Ihezuo 10', 25', 39'; Mauleón 65'; García 69'	Report

Estadio Hidalgo, Pachuca
Attendance: 806
Referee: Alex Billeter (United States)
14 October 2025
19:00 UTC−6

Alajuelense (Costa Rica)	1–0	(Panama) Chorrillo
Varela 11'	Report

Estadio Alejandro Morera Soto, Alajuela
Attendance: 327
Referee: Neressa Goldson (Jamaica)
15 October 2025
20:15 UTC−5

Orlando Pride (United States)	1–1	(Mexico) Pachuca
Marta 25'	Report	Ihezuo 54'

Inter&Co Stadium, Orlando
Attendance: 1,801
Referee: Carly Shaw-MacLaren (Canada)

=== Group B ===
Pos	Team	Pld	W	D	L	GF	GA	GD	Pts	Qualification	WAS	GFC	MON	VNR	ALI
1	(United States) Washington Spirit	4	3	1	0	15	0	+15	10	Advance to knockout stage	—	—	4–0	4–0	—
2	(United States) Gotham FC	4	3	1	0	8	2	+6	10	Advance to knockout stage	0–0	—	2–1	—	—
3	(Mexico) Monterrey	4	2	0	2	13	6	+7	6		—	—	—	4–0	8–0
4	(Canada) Vancouver Rise Academy	4	1	0	3	9	12	−3	3		—	1–4	—	—	8–0
5	(El Salvador) Alianza	4	0	0	4	0	25	−25	0		0–7	0–2	—	—	—

Source: CONCACAF
Rules for classification: Tiebreakers
19 August 2025
18:00 UTC−6

Alianza (El Salvador)	0–7	(United States) Washington Spirit
	Report	Kouassi 21' (pen.), 52', 60'; Ricketts 24'; Ratcliffe 49'; Rodman 56'; Cantore 89'

Estadio Las Delicias, Santa Tecla
Attendance: 211
Referee: Merlin Soto (Honduras)
20 August 2025
19:00 UTC−4

Gotham FC (United States)	2–1	(Mexico) Monterrey
Bruninha 6'; Harper 24'	Report	Restrepo 32'

Icahn Stadium, New York City
Attendance: 858
Referee: Vimarest Díaz (Dominican Republic)
2 September 2025
19:00 UTC−6

Alianza (El Salvador)	0–2	(United States) Gotham FC
	Report	Geyse 62' (pen.); Duran 90+4'

Estadio Jorge "El Mágico" González, San Salvador
Attendance: 294
Referee: Astrid Gramajo (Guatemala)
3 September 2025
19:00 UTC−4

Washington Spirit (United States)	4–0	(Canada) Vancouver Rise Academy
McKeown 31'; Stainbrook 41'; Rodman 45'; Abiodun 81'	Report

Audi Field, Washington, D.C.
Attendance: 1,405
Referee: Crystal Sobers (Trinidad and Tobago)
16 September 2025
19:00 UTC−7

Vancouver Rise Academy (Canada)	1–4	(United States) Gotham FC
Bout 14'	Report	Hasbo 9'; Stengel 12'; González 46'; Bruninha 90+3'

Swangard Stadium, Burnaby
Referee: Lizzet Amairany García Olvera (Mexico)
17 September 2025
19:00 UTC−6

Monterrey (Mexico)	8–0	(El Salvador) Alianza
Silva 14'; Evangelista 27'; Seoposenwe 32'; Soto 45', 80', 85'; Valadez 60' (o.g.); Martínez 79'	Report

Estadio BBVA, Guadalupe
Attendance: 1,671
Referee: Saphire Stockman (Costa Rica)
1 October 2025
19:00 UTC−4

Gotham FC (United States)	0–0	(United States) Washington Spirit
	Report

Subaru Park, Chester
Attendance: 1,257
Referee: Janeishka Caban (Puerto Rico)
2 October 2025
19:00 UTC−6

Monterrey (Mexico)	4–0	(Canada) Vancouver Rise Academy
Gielnik 20', 25'; Pérez 38'; Martínez 45+1'	Report

Estadio BBVA, Guadalupe
Attendance: 1,606
Referee: Dilia Bradley (Guatemala)
15 October 2025
18:15 UTC−4

Washington Spirit (United States)	4–0	(Mexico) Monterrey
Bethune 6'; Kouassi 54'; Monday 57'; del Campo 67' (o.g.)	Report

Audi Field, Washington, D.C.
Attendance: 2,087
Referee: Marianela Araya (Costa Rico)
16 October 2025
19:00 UTC−7

Vancouver Rise Academy (Canada)	8–0	(El Salvador) Alianza
Kashima 3', 23'; Baxter 12' (pen.), 44'; Ewasiuk 39', 49'; Patik 42', 62'	Report

Willoughby Community Park, Langley
Attendance: 1,046
Referee: Diana Pérez Borja (Mexico)

== Knockout stage ==
In the knockout stage, if a match was level at the end of normal playing time, extra time was played (two periods of 15 minutes each). If still tied after extra time, the match was decided by a penalty shoot-out. On 20 January 2026, CONCACAF announced that Estadio Hidalgo in Hidalgo, Mexico would host the knockout stage of the tournament between 20 and 23 May 2026.

=== Bracket ===
Semi-finals
20 May – Pachuca
(Mexico) América	4
(United States) Gotham FC	1
20 May – Pachuca
(United States) Washington Spirit	1
(Mexico) Pachuca	0

Final
23 May – Pachuca
(Mexico) América	5
(United States) Washington Spirit	3
Third place play-off
23 May – Pachuca
(United States) Gotham FC	0
(Mexico) Pachuca	3

=== Semi-finals ===
20 May 2026
17:30 UTC−6

América (Mexico)	4–1	(United States) Gotham FC
Camberos 21', 57', 89' (pen.); Aviléz 70'	Report	González 48'

Estadio Hidalgo, Pachuca
Attendance: 4,505
Referee: Marianela Araya (Costa Rica)

20 May 2026
20:30 UTC−6

Washington Spirit (United States)	1–0	(Mexico) Pachuca
Martínez 81'	Report

Estadio Hidalgo, Pachuca
Attendance: 6,715
Referee: Myriam Marcotte (Canada)

=== Third place play-off ===
23 May 2026
16:00 UTC−6

Gotham FC (United States)	0–3	(Mexico) Pachuca
	Report	Corral 12', 38'; Aline Gomes 84'

Estadio Hidalgo, Pachuca
Attendance: 1,997
Referee: Vimarest Díaz (Dominican Republic)

=== Final ===
23 May 2026
19:30 UTC−6

América (Mexico)	5–3	(United States) Washington Spirit
Aviléz 22'; Geyse 27', 61'; Guerrero 79'; Morgan 90+6' (o.g.)	Report	Cantore 30'; Kouassi 46', 58'

Estadio Hidalgo, Pachuca
Attendance: 9,035
Referee: Carly Shaw-MacLaren (Canada)

== Statistics ==
=== Top goalscorers ===
Rank	Player	Team(s)	Goals
1	(Ivory Coast) Rosemonde Kouassi	(United States) Washington Spirit	6
2	(Mexico) Scarlett Camberos	(Mexico) América	5
2	(Nigeria) Chinwendu Ihezuo	(Mexico) Pachuca	5
4	(Spain) Irene Guerrero	(Mexico) América	4
5	(Brazil) Geyse	(United States) Gotham FC (Mexico) América	3
5	(Mexico) Kiana Palacios	(Mexico) América	3
5	(Mexico) Alice Soto	(Mexico) Monterrey	3
5	(United States) Summer Yates	(United States) Orlando Pride	3
9	Seventeen players		2

=== Best XI ===
CONCACAF selected the following players as the team of the tournament.

Pos.	Player	Team(s)
GK	(Mexico) Itzel Velasco	(Mexican Football Federation) América
DF	(Colombia) Yirleidis Minota	(Mexican Football Federation) Pachuca
DF	(United States) Tara Rudd	(United States Soccer Federation) Washington Spirit
DF	(Mexico) Karina Rodríguez	(Mexican Football Federation) América
MF	(Spain) Andrea Pereira	(Mexican Football Federation) Pachuca
MF	(Mexico) Nancy Antonio	(Mexican Football Federation) América
MF	(Mexico) Montserrat Saldívar	(United States Soccer Federation) América
MF	(Spain) Irene Guerrero	(Mexican Football Federation) América
FW	(Ivory Coast) Rosemonde Kouassi	(United States Soccer Federation) Washington Spirit
FW	(Mexico) Scarlett Camberos	(Mexican Football Federation) América
FW	(Brazil) Geyse	(United States Soccer Federation) Gotham FC (Mexican Football Federation) América

=== Awards ===
Award	Player	Team	Ref.
Best Player Award	(Mexico) Scarlett Camberos	(Mexican Football Federation) América	
Best Goalkeeper Award	(Mexico) Itzel Velasco	(Mexican Football Federation) América	
Young Player Award	(Mexico) Montserrat Saldívar	(Mexican Football Federation) América	
Top Scorer Award	(Ivory Coast) Rosemonde Kouassi	(United States Soccer Federation) Washington Spirit	
Fair Play Award	—N/a	(United States Soccer Federation) Washington Spirit	

== See also ==
- 2026 CONCACAF Champions Cup (men's edition of this tournament)
