= CONCACAF W Champions Cup =

Annual continental football tournament for women's clubs in North America

- Organiser(s): CONCACAF
- Founded: 12 March 2024; 2 years ago
- Region: North America, Central America and the Caribbean
- Teams: 10 (group stage); 11 (total)
- Qualifier for: FIFA Women's Club World Cup; FIFA Women's Champions Cup
- Current champions: (Mexico) América (1st title)
- Most championships: (Mexico) América (United States) Gotham FC (1 title each)
- Broadcaster(s): English; CBS Sports and Paramount+ (United States); ESPN (Caribbean and Africa); YouTube (Canada and other selected non-CONCACAF members); Spanish; ESPN Deportes, ESPN+ (United States), and Disney+ (Central America and Mexico); Dutch; ESPN (Netherlands)
- Website: concacaf.com/w-champions-cup
- 2025–26 CONCACAF W Champions Cup

The CONCACAF W Champions Cup is an annual continental women's football club competition organized by CONCACAF that determines the club champion for the region encompassing North America, Central America and the Caribbean. It is comparable to Champions League competitions on other continents. Involved are the top women's clubs from the region, and serves as the qualification tournament for the future FIFA Women's Club World Cup and FIFA Women's Champions Cup. It is the women's counterpart of the CONCACAF Champions Cup.

== History ==
On 12 March 2024, CONCACAF announced the competition, which began in August 2024. The inaugural tournament was contested by clubs from seven nations: Canada, El Salvador, Costa Rica, Jamaica, Panama, Mexico, and the United States. It ended with a knockout stage in May 2025.

Beginning with the third edition in 2027, the tournament will be rescheduled to take place between July and October of a single calendar year. Additionally, the group stage of the tournament will be removed, resulting in a pure knockout format.

== Competition format ==
The tournament consists of three stages. A preliminary round is contested by two clubs, where the winner advances to the group stage, joining nine other clubs. The group stage consists of two groups of five clubs. Each club plays four matches, two at home and two away. The top two teams in each group advance to the knockout stage, which is played in May of the following year, in a centralized location.

In 2027, the group stage of the tournament will be removed resulting in a pure knockout format. Five teams will enter in the preliminary round, competing for two spots in the quarterfinals. Six teams (three each from Mexico and the United States) will enter in the quarterfinal stage. The quarterfinals and semifinals will be played as home and away series while the preliminary round and final will be single legs.

== Performances ==
=== Performances by club ===
Performance by club
Club	Titles	Runners-up	Years won	Years runners-up
(Mexico) América	1	–	2025–26	
(United States) Gotham FC	1	–	2024–25	
(Mexico) Tigres UANL	–	1		2024–25
(United States) Washington Spirit	–	1		2025–26

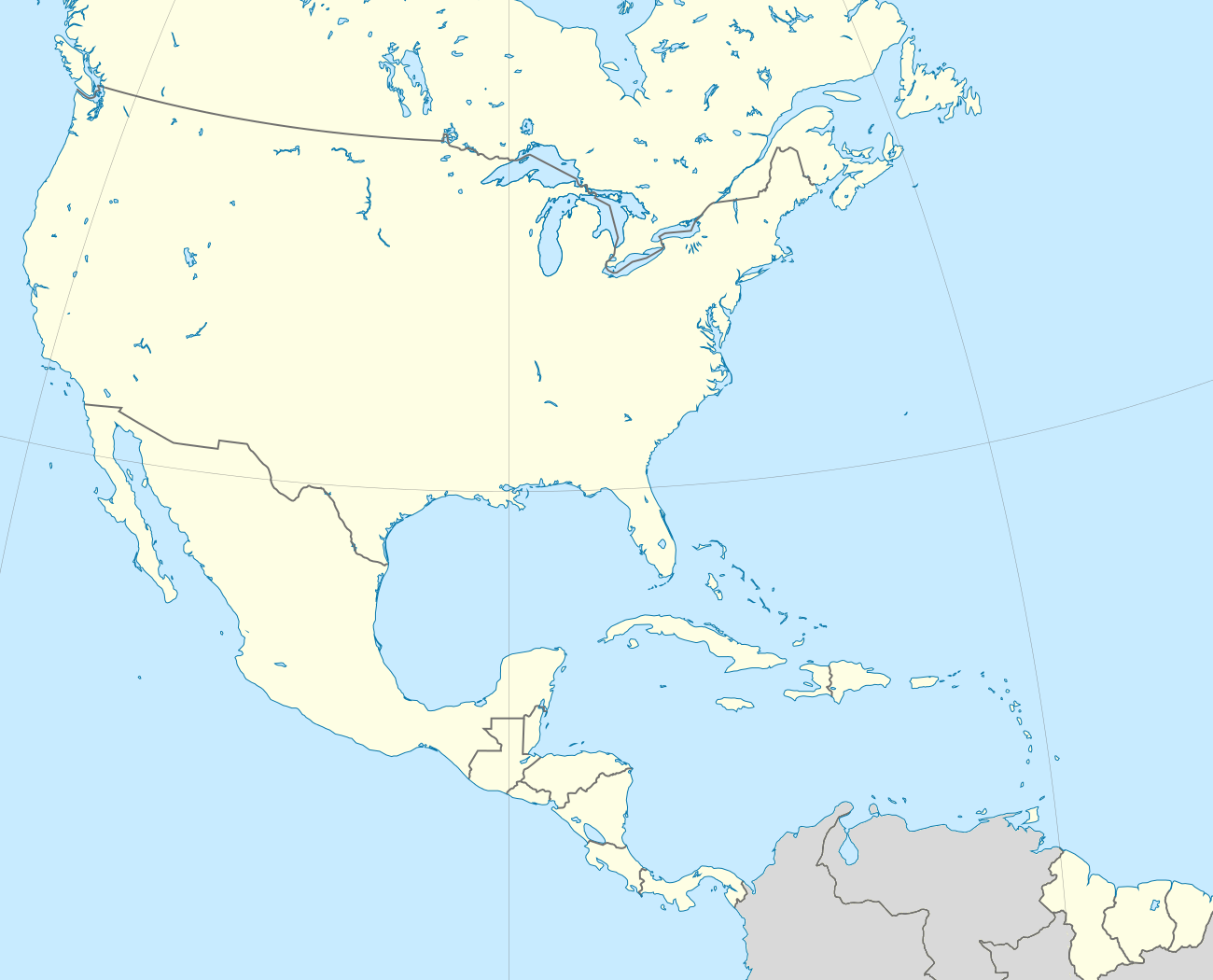
Location of winners

=== Performances by country ===
Performance by country
Country	Titles	Runners-up	Years won	Years runners-up
Mexico	1	1	2025–26	2024–25
United States	1	1	2024–25	2025–26

== Awards ==
Edition	Golden Ball	Golden Boot	Goals	Golden Glove	Young Player Award	Fair Play Trophy
2024–25	(Spain) Esther González (Gotham FC)	(Portugal) Ana Dias (Tigres UANL)	4	(Mexico) Itzel González (Tigres UANL)	(United States) Olivia Moultrie (Portland Thorns)	(Mexico) América
2025–26	(Mexico) Scarlett Camberos (América)	(Ivory Coast) Rosemonde Kouassi (Washington Spirit)	6	(Mexico) Itzel Velasco (América)	(Mexico) Montserrat Saldívar (América)	(United States) Washington Spirit

== See also ==
- NWSL x Liga MX Femenil Summer Cup
- UNCAF Women's Interclub Championship
- FIFA Women's Club World Cup
  - AFC Women's Champions League
  - CONMEBOL Libertadores Femenina
  - UEFA Women's Champions League
  - OFC Women's Champions League
  - CAF Women's Champions League
