= 2019–20 Tigres UANL (women) season =

UANL
2019–20 season
- Chairman: Miguel Ángel Garza
- Manager: Roberto Medina
- Stadium: Estadio Universitario
- Apertura: Runners-up (2nd)
- Clausura: 1st (canceled)
- Top goalscorer: Katty Martínez (18 goals)
- Biggest win: San Luis 1–6 UANL (24 February 2020)
- Biggest defeat: Pachuca 3–1 UANL (21 November 2019)
Home colours	Away colours

The 2019–20 season was UANL's third competitive season and third season in the Liga MX Femenil, the top flight of Mexican women's football.

Tigres UANL started the season under new manager Roberto Medina, after Ramón Villa Zevallos left to Guadalajara; Medina previously managed Mexico women's national football senior and U-20 teams.

In the first half of the season, UANL qualified to the playoffs and reached the Apertura 2019 final, losing against Monterrey in a rematch of the previous tournament final, which Tigres won.

For the second half of the season, on 22 May 2020, the Clausura tournament was canceled due to the COVID-19 pandemic; in that moment UANL was ranked first.

== Squad ==
=== Apertura ===
No.	Nat.	Name	Date of birth (age)	Since
Goalkeepers
20	(Mexico)	Ofelia Solís	27 February 1996 (aged 23)	2017
29	(Mexico)	Anjulí Ladrón de Guevara	7 October 1986 (aged 32)	2019
33	(Mexico)	Vania Villalobos	6 November 2003 (aged 15)	2018
34	(Mexico)	Stefani Jiménez	29 June 1994 (aged 25)	2019
Defenders
3	(Mexico)	Jazmín Enrigue	9 May 2000 (aged 19)	2017
4	(Mexico)	Greta Espinoza	5 June 1995 (aged 24)	2018
13	(Mexico)	Karen Luna	12 February 1998 (aged 21)	2017
17	(Mexico)	Natalia Villarreal	19 March 1998 (aged 21)	2017
22	(Mexico)	Selene Cortés	3 October 1998 (aged 20)	2017
23	(Mexico)	Paulina Solís	13 March 1996 (aged 23)	2018
26	(Mexico)	Vanessa Flores	26 May 1997 (aged 22)	2019
31	(Mexico)	Natalia Miramontes	2 March 2002 (aged 17)	2018
Midfielders
6	(Mexico)	Nancy Antonio	2 April 1996 (aged 23)	2017
7	(Mexico)	Liliana Mercado (Captain)	22 October 1988 (aged 30)	2017
8	(Mexico)	Carolina Jaramillo	19 March 1994 (aged 25)	2017
11	(Mexico)	Nayeli Rangel	28 February 1992 (aged 27)	2017
14	(Mexico)	Lizbeth Ovalle	19 October 1999 (aged 19)	2017
15	(Mexico)	Cristina Ferral	16 February 1993 (aged 26)	2018
16	(Mexico)	Sonia Vázquez	28 July 1996 (aged 22)	2018
21	(Mexico)	Natalia Gómez Junco	9 August 1992 (aged 26)	2019
27	(Mexico)	Perla Navarrete	23 March 1994 (aged 25)	2019
32	(Mexico)	Mariana Elizondo	10 October 2002 (aged 16)	2017
Forwards
5	(Mexico)	Fernanda Elizondo	27 July 1991 (aged 27)	2018
9	(Mexico)	Evelyn González	5 December 1996 (aged 22)	2017
10	(Mexico)	Katty Martínez	14 March 1998 (aged 21)	2017
18	(Mexico)	Belén Cruz	7 November 1998 (aged 20)	2017
19	(Mexico)	Blanca Solís	30 April 1996 (aged 23)	2017
28	(Mexico)	Britany Cárdenas	8 September 2002 (aged 16)	2019
30	(Mexico)	Miah Zuazua	27 April 1999 (aged 20)	2019

=== Clausura ===
No.	Nat.	Name	Date of birth (age)	Since
Goalkeepers
1	(Mexico)	Alejandra Gutiérrez	9 September 1994 (aged 25)	2018
20	(Mexico)	Ofelia Solís	27 February 1996 (aged 23)	2017
33	(Mexico)	Vania Villalobos	6 November 2003 (aged 16)	2018
Defenders
2	(Mexico)	Akemi Yokoyama	28 October 1999 (aged 20)	2017
4	(Mexico)	Greta Espinoza	5 June 1995 (aged 24)	2018
5	(Mexico)	Bianca Sierra	25 June 1992 (aged 27)	2020
13	(Mexico)	Karen Luna	12 February 1998 (aged 21)	2017
17	(Mexico)	Natalia Villarreal	19 March 1998 (aged 21)	2017
22	(Mexico)	Selene Cortés	3 October 1998 (aged 21)	2017
23	(Mexico)	Paulina Solís	13 March 1996 (aged 23)	2018
26	(Mexico)	Vanessa Flores	26 May 1997 (aged 22)	2019
31	(Mexico)	Natalia Miramontes	2 March 2002 (aged 17)	2018
Midfielders
6	(Mexico)	Nancy Antonio (Vice-captain)	2 April 1996 (aged 23)	2017
7	(Mexico)	Liliana Mercado (Captain)	22 October 1988 (aged 31)	2017
8	(Mexico)	Carolina Jaramillo	19 March 1994 (aged 25)	2017
11	(Mexico)	Nayeli Rangel	28 February 1992 (aged 27)	2017
14	(Mexico)	Lizbeth Ovalle	19 October 1999 (aged 20)	2017
15	(Mexico)	Cristina Ferral	16 February 1993 (aged 26)	2018
16	(Mexico)	Sonia Vázquez	28 July 1996 (aged 23)	2018
21	(Mexico)	Natalia Gómez Junco	9 August 1992 (aged 27)	2019
24	(Mexico)	Vanessa González	3 June 1999 (aged 20)	2017
27	(Mexico)	Perla Navarrete	23 March 1994 (aged 25)	2019
32	(Mexico)	Mariana Elizondo	10 October 2002 (aged 17)	2017
Forwards
9	(Mexico)	Stephany Mayor	23 September 1991 (aged 28)	2020
10	(Mexico)	Katty Martínez	14 March 1998 (aged 21)	2017
18	(Mexico)	Belén Cruz	7 November 1998 (aged 21)	2017
19	(Mexico)	Blanca Solís	30 April 1996 (aged 23)	2017
28	(Mexico)	Brenda Viramontes	24 April 1995 (aged 24)	2020
30	(Mexico)	Miah Zuazua	27 April 1999 (aged 20)	2019
36	(Mexico)	Yenifer García	11 July 2003 (aged 16)	2020

== Transfers ==
=== In ===
Pos.	Player	Moving from	Transfer window	Ref.
MF	(Mexico) Perla Navarrete	León	Summer	
GK	(Mexico) Anjulí Ladrón de Guevara	Free agent	Summer	
FW	(Mexico) Stephany Mayor	(Iceland) Þór/KA	Winter	
FW	(Mexico) Brenda Viramontes	Guadalajara	Winter	
DF	(Mexico) Bianca Sierra	(Iceland) Þór/KA	Winter	

=== Out ===
Pos.	Player	Moving to	Transfer window	Ref.
GK	(Mexico) Ángeles Martínez	León	Summer	
MF	(Mexico) Jaquelín García	UNAM	Summer	
MF	(Mexico) Liliana Rodríguez	UNAM	Summer	
DF	(Mexico) Julissa Dávila	Atlas	Summer	
FW	(Mexico) Evelyn González	UANL	Winter	
GK	(Mexico) Stefani Jiménez	Juárez	Winter	

== Coaching staff ==
Position	Staff
Manager	(Mexico) Roberto Medina
Assistant manager	(Mexico) Karla Báez
Fitness coach	(Mexico) Diego Fernández
Doctor	(Mexico) Nancy Guevara
Kinesiologist/Medical assistant	(Mexico) Linda Montemayor
Kit manager	(Mexico) Oscar Méndez

== Competitions ==
=== Overview ===
Competition	First match	Last match	Starting round	Final position	Record							
Competition	First match	Last match	Starting round	Final position	Pld	W	D	L	GF	GA	GD	Win %
Apertura	15 July 2019	7 December 2019	Matchday 1	Runner-ups	24	15	6	3	50	19	+31	62.50
Clausura	13 January 2020	13 April 2020	Matchday 1	1st	8	7	1	0	22	5	+17	87.50
Total					32	22	7	3	72	24	+48	68.75

Source: Competitions

=== Torneo Apertura ===
==== League table ====
Pos	Team	Pld	W	D	L	GF	GA	GD	Pts	Qualification or relegation
1	Monterrey (C)	18	16	0	2	52	16	+36	48	Advance to Liguilla (Note: The first 8 places in the table qualify for the Liguilla. The last ranked team in the relegation table can qualify for the liguilla in the Apertura tournament.)
2	UANL	18	13	4	1	41	14	+27	43	Advance to Liguilla
3	Pachuca	18	11	3	4	42	24	+18	36	Advance to Liguilla
4	América	18	9	5	4	29	17	+12	32	Advance to Liguilla
5	Guadalajara	18	9	4	5	30	23	+7	31	Advance to Liguilla

Updated to match(es) played on 11 November 2019. Source: Liga MX Femenil
Rules for classification: 1) Points; 2) Goal difference; 3) Number of goals scored; 4) Head-to-head results between tied teams; 5) Number of goals scored away; 6) Highest relegation coefficient; 7) Fair Play points
(C) Champions

==== Matches ====
15 July 2019 1	UANL	2–1	Guadalajara	San Nicolás de los Garza, Nuevo León
20:00	Martínez 21'; Cruz 33'	Report	Castillo 90'	Stadium: Estadio Universitario; Referee: Oscar Eduardo Peña

29 July 2019 3	Santos Laguna	2–2	UANL	Torreón, Coahuila
21:00	Peraza 41', 62'	Report	Gómez Junco 1'; F. Elizondo 44'	Stadium: Estadio Corona; Referee: Karen Hernández

5 August 2019 4	UANL	0–0	UNAM	San Nicolás de los Garza, Nuevo León
20:00		Report		Stadium: Estadio Universitario; Referee: Diana Pérez

12 August 2019 5	Morelia	3–3	UANL	Morelia, Michoacán
16:00	Jiménez 17', 40'; Molina 23'	Report	Martínez 6', 85'; Espinoza 65'	Stadium: Estadio Morelos; Referee: Francia González

19 August 2019 6	UANL	4–0	Puebla	San Nicolás de los Garza, Nuevo León
20:00	Cruz 8'; Ovalle 14', 69'; Martínez 65' (pen.)	Report		Stadium: Estadio Universitario; Referee: Héctor Abraham Pineda

22 August 2019 7	Cruz Azul	0–2	UANL	Ciudad Cooperativa, Hidalgo
16:00		Report	Ovalle 34'; Cruz 71'	Stadium: Estadio 10 de Diciembre; Referee: Lizzet García

26 August 2019 8	UANL	3–2	Monterrey	San Nicolás de los Garza, Nuevo León
20:00	Mercado 43' (pen.); Martínez 60', 62'	Report	Evangelista 9'; Monsiváis 48'	Stadium: Estadio Universitario; Referee: Karen Hernández

9 September 2019 9	Toluca	0–0	UANL	Toluca, State of Mexico
17:00		Report		Stadium: Estadio Nemesio Díez; Referee: Katia García

14 September 2019 10	UANL	4–0	Atlético San Luis	San Nicolás de los Garza, Nuevo León
19:00	Martínez 14'; Mercado 33'; Urbieta 63' (o.g.); Ovalle 69'	Report		Stadium: Estadio Universitario; Referee: Mauricio López

19 September 2019 11	Pachuca	3–2	UANL	Pachuca, Hidalgo
19:00	Salazar 38'; Ocampo 83', 86'	Report	Martínez 42'; Cruz 50'	Stadium: Estadio Hidalgo; Referee: Lizzet García

23 September 2019 12	UANL	2–0	Tijuana	San Nicolás de los Garza, Nuevo León
20:00	Ovalle 8'; Martínez 35'	Report		Stadium: Estadio Universitario; Referee: Diana Pérez

27 September 2019 13	Juárez	1–2	UANL	Ciudad Juárez, Chihuahua
19:00	González 9'	Report	Antonio 73'; Martínez 83'	Stadium: Estadio Olímpico Benito Juárez; Referee: Fernando Portillo

14 October 2019 14	UANL	4–0	Necaxa	San Nicolás de los Garza, Nuevo León
20:00	Ovalle 38'; Cruz 51'; Gómez Junco 73'; F. Elizondo 85'	Report		Stadium: Estadio Universitario; Referee: Felipe Moreno

21 October 2019 15	Veracruz	0–2	UANL	Boca del Río, Veracruz
17:00		Report	Osorio 10' (o.g.); Ovalle 18'	Stadium: Estadio Luis "Pirata" Fuente; Referee: Guillermo Álvarez

24 October 2019 16	UANL	1–0	León	San Nicolás de los Garza, Nuevo León
18:00	Luna 73'	Report		Stadium: Estadio Universitario; Referee: Erick García

28 October 2019 17	UANL	2–1	América	San Nicolás de los Garza, Nuevo León
20:00	Ovalle 25'; Cruz 82'	Report	Espinosa 84'	Stadium: Estadio Universitario; Referee: Priscila Pérez

2 November 2019 18	Atlas	1–4	UANL	Zapopan, Jalisco
11:00	Maldonado 61'	Report	Zuazua 6'; Espinoza 55', 69'; Antonio 83' (pen.)	Stadium: Estadio Alfredo "Pistache" Torres; Referee: Katia García

8 November 2019 19	Querétaro	0–2	UANL	Querétaro City, Querétaro
16:00		Report	Rangel 16'; Gómez Junco 35'	Stadium: Estadio Corregidora; Referee: Luis Alfredo García

==== Playoffs ====
===== Quarterfinals =====
14 November 2019 First leg	Tijuana	0–0	UANL	Tijuana, Baja California
19:00		Report		Stadium: Estadio Caliente; Referee: Joaquín Vizcarra

17 November 2019 Second leg	UANL	3–0 (3–0 agg.)	Tijuana	San Nicolás de los Garza, Nuevo León
19:00	Ovalle 59'; Zapata 68' (o.g.); Martínez 81'	Report		Stadium: Estadio Universitario; Referee: Karen Hernández

===== Semifinals =====
21 November 2019 First leg	Pachuca	3–1	UANL	Pachuca, Hidalgo
19:00	Ocampo 54'; Ángeles 58', 82'	Report	F. Elizondo 12'	Stadium: Estadio Hidalgo; Referee: Lizzet García

24 November 2019 Second leg	UANL	4–0 (5–3 agg.)	Pachuca	San Nicolás de los Garza, Nuevo León
17:00	Martínez 24', 81'; Rangel 44'; Santellán 47' (o.g.)	Report		Stadium: Estadio Universitario; Referee: Priscila Pérez

===== Final =====
29 November 2019 First leg	UANL	1–1	Monterrey	San Nicolás de los Garza, Nuevo León
21:05	Cruz 5'	Report	Mejía 53'	Stadium: Estadio Universitario; Referee: Priscila Pérez

7 December 2019 Second leg	Monterrey	1–0 (2–1 agg.)	UANL	Guadalupe, Nuevo León
17:00	Evangelista 31'	Report		Stadium: Estadio BBVA Bancomer; Referee: Karen Hernández

=== Torneo Clausura ===
==== League table ====
Pos	Team	Pld	W	D	L	GF	GA	GD	Pts
1	UANL	8	7	1	0	22	5	+17	22
2	Atlas	9	7	1	1	18	7	+11	22
3	Guadalajara	10	5	3	2	16	10	+6	18
4	Monterrey	8	5	2	1	15	9	+6	17
5	América	9	5	2	2	16	11	+5	17

Updated to match(es) played on 15 March 2020. Source: Liga MX Femenil
Rules for classification: 1) Points; 2) Goal difference; 3) Number of goals scored; 4) Head-to-head results between tied teams; 5) Number of goals scored away; 6) Highest relegation coefficient; 7) Fair Play points

==== Matches ====
13 January 2020 2	León	0–1	UANL	León, Guanajuato
19:00		Report	Cruz 81'	Stadium: Estadio León; Referee: Lizzet García

20 January 2020 3	UANL	1–1	Toluca	San Nicolás de los Garza, Nuevo León
20:00	Solís 21'	Report	Román 45+2'	Stadium: Estadio Universitario; Referee: Luis Alfredo García

26 January 2020 4	Puebla	0–2	UANL	Puebla City, Puebla
12:00		Report	Martínez 1' (pen.); Rangel 79'	Stadium: Estadio Cuauhtémoc; Referee: Diana Pérez

3 February 2020 5	UANL	2–0	Atlas	San Nicolás de los Garza, Nuevo León
17:00	Cruz 35'; Zuazua 50'	Report		Stadium: Estadio Universitario; Referee: Karen Hernández

7 February 2020 6	Necaxa	1–4	UANL	Aguascalientes City, Aguascalientes
16:00	Alvarado 18'	Report	Zuazua 9'; Martínez 29' (pen.), 36'; Espinoza 41' (pen.)	Stadium: Estadio Victoria; Referee: Miguel Ángel Anaya

17 February 2020 7	UANL	3–1	Pachuca	San Nicolás de los Garza, Nuevo León
20:00	Mayor 12', 27'; Ovalle 63' (pen.)	Report	Salazar 41'	Stadium: Estadio Universitario; Referee: Lizzet García

24 February 2020 8	Atlético San Luis	1–6	UANL	San Luis Potosí City, San Luis Potosí
20:00	Kasis 65'	Report	Mayor 19', 25', 32'; Martínez 29' (pen.); Ovalle 55'; García 71'	Stadium: Estadio Alfonso Lastras1; Referee: Miguel Ángel Anaya

2 March 2020 9	UANL	3–1	Morelia	San Nicolás de los Garza, Nuevo León
20:00	Martínez 36'; Ovalle 44'; Mayor 64'	Report	Rodríguez 48'	Stadium: Estadio Universitario; Referee: Felipe Moreno

16 March 2020 10	América	Canceled	UANL	Coyoacán, Mexico City
				Stadium: Club América
Note: On 22 May 2020, the Clausura tournament was canceled due to the COVID-19 pandemic.

13 April 2020 1	Monterrey	Canceled	UANL	Guadalupe, Nuevo León
				Stadium: Estadio BBVA Bancomer
Note: On 22 May 2020, the Clausura tournament was canceled due to the COVID-19 pandemic.

11	UANL	Canceled	Santos Laguna	San Nicolás de los Garza, Nuevo León
				Stadium: Estadio Universitario
Note: On 22 May 2020, the Clausura tournament was canceled due to the COVID-19 pandemic.

12	UNAM	Canceled	UANL	Coyoacán, Mexico City
				Stadium: La Cantera
Note: On 22 May 2020, the Clausura tournament was canceled due to the COVID-19 pandemic.

13	UANL	Canceled	Juárez	San Nicolás de los Garza, Nuevo León
				Stadium: Estadio Universitario
Note: On 22 May 2020, the Clausura tournament was canceled due to the COVID-19 pandemic.

14	Guadalajara	Canceled	UANL	Zapopan, Jalisco
				Stadium: Estadio Akron
Note: On 22 May 2020, the Clausura tournament was canceled due to the COVID-19 pandemic.

15	UANL	Canceled	Querétaro	San Nicolás de los Garza, Nuevo León
				Stadium: Estadio Universitario
Note: On 22 May 2020, the Clausura tournament was canceled due to the COVID-19 pandemic.

16	Tijuana	Canceled	UANL	Tijuana, Baja California
				Stadium: Estadio Caliente
Note: On 22 May 2020, the Clausura tournament was canceled due to the COVID-19 pandemic.

17	UANL	Canceled	Cruz Azul	San Nicolás de los Garza, Nuevo León
				Stadium: Estadio Universitario
Note: On 22 May 2020, the Clausura tournament was canceled due to the COVID-19 pandemic.

== Statistics ==
=== Appearances and goals ===
No.	Pos	Nat	Player	Total		Apertura		Clausura	
No.	Pos	Nat	Player	Apps	Goals	Apps	Goals	Apps	Goals
4	DF	(Mexico) MEX	Greta Espinoza	32	4	24	3	8	1
5	DF	(Mexico) MEX	Bianca Sierra	2	0	0	0	2	0
6	MF	(Mexico) MEX	Nancy Antonio	27	2	19	2	8	0
7	MF	(Mexico) MEX	Liliana Mercado	25	2	22	2	3	0
8	MF	(Mexico) MEX	Carolina Jaramillo	14	0	11	0	3	0
9	FW	(Mexico) MEX	Stephany Mayor	3	6	0	0	3	6
10	FW	(Mexico) MEX	Katty Martínez	25	18	18	13	7	5
11	MF	(Mexico) MEX	Nayeli Rangel	25	3	19	2	6	1
13	DF	(Mexico) MEX	Karen Luna	23	1	19	1	4	0
14	MF	(Mexico) MEX	Lizbeth Ovalle	24	12	21	9	3	3
15	MF	(Mexico) MEX	Cristina Ferral	32	0	24	0	8	0
16	MF	(Mexico) MEX	Sonia Vázquez	4	0	4	0	0	0
17	DF	(Mexico) MEX	Natalia Villarreal	20	0	12	0	8	0
18	FW	(Mexico) MEX	Belén Cruz	28	9	21	7	7	2
19	FW	(Mexico) MEX	Blanca Solís	20	1	17	0	3	1
20	GK	(Mexico) MEX	Ofelia Solís	22	0	18	0	4	0
21	MF	(Mexico) MEX	Natalia Gómez Junco	20	3	13	3	7	0
22	DF	(Mexico) MEX	Selene Cortés	18	0	18	0	0	0
23	DF	(Mexico) MEX	Paulina Solís	7	0	5	0	2	0
26	DF	(Mexico) MEX	Vanessa Flores	7	0	3	0	4	0
27	MF	(Mexico) MEX	Perla Navarrete	10	0	6	0	4	0
28	FW	(Mexico) MEX	Britany Cárdenas	1	0	1	0	0	0
29	FW	(Mexico) MEX	Brenda Viramontes	2	0	0	0	2	0
30	FW	(Mexico) MEX	Miah Zuazua	13	3	6	1	7	2
31	DF	(Mexico) MEX	Natalia Miramontes	5	0	4	0	1	0
32	MF	(Mexico) MEX	Mariana Elizondo	4	0	2	0	2	0
33	GK	(Mexico) MEX	Vania Villalobos	10	0	6	0	4	0
36	FW	(Mexico) MEX	Yenifer García	1	1	0	0	1	1
Players that left the club during the season
5	FW	(Mexico) MEX	Fernanda Elizondo	15	3	15	3	0	0
9	FW	(Mexico) MEX	Evelyn González	5	0	5	0	0	0

=== Goalscorers ===
Rank	Pos.	No.	Player	Apertura	Clausura	Total
1	FW	10	(Mexico) Katty Martínez	13	5	18
2	MF	14	(Mexico) Lizbeth Ovalle	9	3	12
3	FW	18	(Mexico) Belén Cruz	7	2	9
4	FW	9	(Mexico) Stephany Mayor	0	6	6
5	DF	4	(Mexico) Greta Espinoza	3	1	4
6	FW	5	(Mexico) Fernanda Elizondo	3	0	3
6	MF	11	(Mexico) Nayeli Rangel	2	1	3
6	MF	21	(Mexico) Natalia Gómez Junco	3	0	3
6	FW	30	(Mexico) Miah Zuazua	1	2	3
10	MF	6	(Mexico) Nancy Antonio	2	0	2
10	MF	7	(Mexico) Liliana Mercado	2	0	2
12	DF	13	(Mexico) Karen Luna	1	0	1
12	FW	19	(Mexico) Blanca Solís	0	1	1
12	FW	36	(Mexico) Yenifer García	0	1	1
Own goals				4	0	4
Total				50	22	72

=== Hat-tricks ===
Player	Against	Result	Date	Competition	Ref.
(Mexico) Stephany Mayor	Atlético San Luis	6–1 (A)	24 February 2020	Liga MX Femenil	
