= 2020–21 Liga MX Femenil season =

Mexican women's football league season

Liga MX Femenil
- Season: 2020–21
- Champions: Guardianes 2020: UANL (3rd title); Guardianes 2021: UANL (4th title)
- Matches: 306
- Goals: 860 (2.81 per match)
- Top goalscorer: Guardianes 2020: Katty Martínez (18 goals); Guardianes 2021: Alison González (18 goals)
- Biggest home win: Guardianes 2020: América 8–0 Mazatlán (26 September 2020); Guardianes 2021: Monterrey 5–0 Necaxa (18 January 2021); Guadalajara 5–0 Monterrey (26 April 2021)
- Biggest away win: Guardianes 2020: Juárez 0–5 Monterrey (17 September 2020); Puebla 0–5 Guadalajara (8 November 2020); Guardianes 2021: Atlético San Luis 0–5 Monterrey (10 January 2021)
- Highest scoring: Guardianes 2020: América 8–0 Mazatlán (26 September 2020); Guardianes 2021: Atlético San Luis 3–5 Tijuana (31 January 2021)
- Longest winning run: Guardianes 2020:10 matches UANL; Guardianes 2021: 4 matches Atlas
- Longest unbeaten run: Guardianes 2020: 15 matches UANL; Guardianes 2021: 8 matches Atlas
- Longest winless run: Guardianes 2020: 12 matches Tijuana; Guardianes 2021: 9 matches Puebla
- Longest losing run: Guardianes 2020: 8 matches Tijuana; Guardianes 2021: 4 matches Atlético San Luis
- Highest attendance: Guardianes 2021:3,329; UANL vs Mazatlán (26 April 2021)
- Lowest attendance: Guardianes 2021:235; Guadalajara vs UANL (3 May 2021)
- Total attendance: Guardianes 2020: 0 Guardianes 2021:15,168 (12 matches)
- Average attendance: Guardianes 2020: 0 Guardianes 2021:1,264
- The previous season was suspended in response to the COVID-19 pandemic. Stats are from the regular phase only Source: Liga MX Femenil

The 2020–21 Liga MX Femenil season was the fourth season of the premier women's football league in Mexico. The season began on 13 August 2020 and finished on 31 May 2021, albeit behind closed doors because of the COVID-19 pandemic.

== Teams, stadiums, and personnel ==
After Tiburonas Rojas's disaffiliation at the end of the Apertura 2019 as well as the Monarcas Morelia's franchise change to Mazatlán F.C., the league returned to 18 teams.

=== Stadiums and locations ===
América	Atlas	Atlético San Luis	Cruz Azul	Guadalajara
Estadio Azteca	Estadio Jalisco	Estadio Alfonso Lastras	Instalaciones La Noria	Estadio Akron
Capacity: 81,070	Capacity: 55,110	Capacity: 25,111	Capacity: 2,000	Capacity: 46,232
Juárez	León	Mazatlán	Monterrey	Necaxa
Estadio Olímpico Benito Juárez	Estadio León	Estadio de Mazatlán	Estadio BBVA	Estadio Victoria
Capacity: 19,703	Capacity: 31,297	Capacity: 25,000	Capacity: 51,348	Capacity: 23,851
Pachuca	Puebla	Querétaro	Santos Laguna	Tijuana
Estadio Hidalgo	Estadio Cuauhtémoc	Estadio Corregidora	Estadio Corona	Estadio Caliente
Capacity: 27,512	Capacity: 51,726	Capacity: 33,162	Capacity: 29,237	Capacity: 27,333
Toluca	UANL	UNAM		
Estadio Nemesio Díez	Estadio Universitario	Estadio Olímpico Universitario		
Capacity: 31,000	Capacity: 41,886	Capacity: 48,297		

=== Alternate venues ===
- América – Cancha Centenario No. 5 (Capacity: 1,000)
- Atlas – Estadio Colomos Alfredo 'Pistache' Torres (Capacity: 3,000)
- Guadalajara – Verde Valle (Capacity: 800)
- Monterrey – El Barrial (Capacity: 570)
- Toluca – Instalaciones Metepec (Capacity: 1,000)
- UANL – Instalaciones Zuazua (Capacity: 800)
- UNAM – La Cantera (Capacity: 2,000)
Location of the 2020–21 Liga MX Femenil teams
Location of the 2020–21 Liga MX Femenil teams in Greater Mexico City

=== Personnel and kits ===
Team	Chairman	Head coach	Kit manufacturer	Shirt sponsor(s)
América	Emilio Azcárraga Jean	(Mexico) Hugo Ruíz (Interim)	Nike	AT&T
Atlas	José Riestra	(Mexico) Fernando Samayoa	Charly	Banco Azteca
Atlético San Luis	Alberto Marrero	(Mexico) Rigoberto Esparza	Pirma	Canel's
Cruz Azul	Álvaro Dávila	(Mexico) Carlos Roberto Pérez	Joma	Cemento Cruz Azul
Guadalajara	Amaury Vergara	(Mexico) Édgar Mejía	Puma	Sello Rojo
Juárez	Guillermo Cantú	(Mexico) Ana Cristina González	Charly	Del Río
León	Jesús Martínez Murguia	(Mexico) Scarlett Anaya	Pirma	Cementos Fortaleza
Mazatlán	Mauricio Lanz González	(Mexico) Miguel Javid Hernández	Pirma	Banco Azteca
Monterrey	José González Ornelas	(Mexico) Héctor Becerra	Puma	AT&T
Necaxa	Ernesto Tinajero Flores	(Mexico) Leonardo Álvarez (Interim)	Pirma	Rolcar
Pachuca	Armando Martínez Patiño	(Spain) Toña Is	Charly	Cementos Fortaleza
Puebla	Manuel Jiménez García	(Mexico) Juan Carlos Cacho	Umbro	Banco Azteca
Querétaro	Manuel Velarde	(Mexico) Carla Rossi	Charly	Banco Multiva
Santos Laguna	Dante Elizalde	(Mexico) Jorge Campos	Charly	Soriana
Tijuana	Jorge Hank Inzunsa	(Colombia) Frankie Oviedo	Charly	Caliente
Toluca	Francisco Suinaga	(Mexico) Alberto Cuate	Under Armour	Banamex
UANL	Alejandro Rodríguez	(Mexico) Roberto Medina	Adidas	Cemex
UNAM	Leopoldo Silva Gutiérrez	(Mexico) Ileana Dávila	Nike	DHL Express

== Format ==
- The Liga MX Femenil season is split into two championships: the Torneo Guardianes 2020 (opening tournament) and the Torneo Guardianes 2021 (closing tournament). Each is contested in an identical format and includes the same eighteen teams.
- Since 2019–20 season the teams compete in a single group, the best eight of the general table qualify to the championship playoffs.

=== Changes ===
- This season witnessed the debut of Mazatlán F.C., the team that replaced Monarcas Morelia after the franchise's relocation to Mazatlán, Sinaloa.
- During the hiatus caused by the pandemic, the league saw five coaching changes. Carla Rossi left Tijuana to coach for Querétaro. Frankie Oviedo replaced her as head coach of the Xolas. Édgar Mejía now heads the Chivas, while Rigoberto Esparza leads Atlético San Luis. Miguel Javid Hernández is Mazatlán's inaugural coach.

== Torneo Guardianes 2020 ==
The 2020 Torneo Guardianes is the first tournament of the season. The tournament was renamed Torneo Guardianes 2020 (stylized as Guard1anes) in honor of the job healthcare workers have done during the COVID-19 pandemic in Mexico. The tournament began on 13 August 2020.

=== Regular season ===
==== Standings ====
Pos	Team	Pld	W	D	L	GF	GA	GD	Pts	Qualification or relegation
1	UANL (C)	17	15	1	1	50	11	+39	46	Advance to Liguilla (Note: The first 8 places in the table qualify for the Liguilla.)
2	Atlas	17	13	2	2	45	18	+27	41	Advance to Liguilla
3	Monterrey	17	13	2	2	41	19	+22	41	Advance to Liguilla
4	Guadalajara	17	12	2	3	42	17	+25	38	Advance to Liguilla
5	América	17	11	4	2	35	12	+23	37	Advance to Liguilla
6	UNAM	17	8	3	6	25	15	+10	27	Advance to Liguilla
7	Querétaro	17	7	5	5	24	20	+4	26	Advance to Liguilla
8	Pachuca	17	7	3	7	24	25	−1	24	Advance to Liguilla
9	Santos Laguna	17	5	6	6	17	20	−3	21	
10	Mazatlán	17	6	3	8	14	39	−25	21	
11	Atlético San Luis	17	5	2	10	22	30	−8	17	
12	Puebla	17	4	5	8	12	23	−11	17	
13	León	17	4	4	9	21	31	−10	16	
14	Cruz Azul	17	3	5	9	14	24	−10	14	
15	Toluca	17	4	1	12	16	29	−13	13	
16	Tijuana	17	3	3	11	16	31	−15	12	
17	Juárez	17	3	2	12	13	44	−31	11	
18	Necaxa	17	3	1	13	10	33	−23	10	

Updated to match(es) played on 20 November 2020. Source: Liga MX Femenil
Rules for classification: 1) Points; 2) Goal difference; 3) Number of goals scored; 4) Head-to-head results between tied teams; 5) Number of goals scored away; 6) Highest relegation coefficient; 7) Fair Play points
(C) Champions

==== Positions by Round ====
Qualification to quarter-finals
Last place in table

Team ╲ Round	1	2	3	4	5	6	7	8	9	10	11	12	13	14	15	16	17
UANL	7	2	2	2	4	4	2	2	1	1	1	1	1	1	1	1	1
Atlas	3	8	9	7	6	6	5	5	5	5	4	3	3	4	4	4	2
Monterrey	6	3	3	4	2	1	1	1	3	2	2	2	2	2	3	2	3
Guadalajara	1	1	1	1	3	3	3	4	2	3	3	4	4	3	2	3	4
América	4	4	4	3	1	2	4	3	4	4	5	5	5	5	5	5	5
UNAM (Note: A pending match between weeks 1 and 4)	10	11	7	6	5	5	6	7	7	6	6	7	8	6	7	6	6
Querétaro	13	12	13	14	12	8	8	10	8	8	8	8	6	7	6	7	7
Pachuca	5	5	5	5	7	7	7	6	6	7	7	6	7	8	8	8	8
Santos Laguna	9	15	16	12	14	15	16	14	15	10	11	13	10	10	10	10	9
Mazatlán	16	18	12	13	16	12	14	15	16	12	9	10	9	9	9	9	10
Atlético San Luis	8	9	6	10	10	11	13	9	11	15	15	12	12	12	12	11	11
Puebla	11	10	11	9	9	10	10	11	14	16	14	11	13	13	13	12	12
León	2	6	10	8	8	9	9	12	12	14	16	16	16	16	16	13	13
Cruz Azul	15	7	8	11	11	13	15	16	13	13	13	15	15	15	15	15	14
Toluca	12	13	14	15	13	14	11	13	9	9	10	9	11	11	11	14	15
Tijuana	17	17	17	17	17	17	18	18	18	18	18	18	18	18	18	18	16
Juárez	18	14	15	16	15	16	12	8	10	11	12	14	14	14	14	16	17
Necaxa	14	16	18	18	18	18	17	17	17	17	17	17	17	17	17	17	18

Updated to match(es) played on 20 November 2020. Source: Liga MX Femenil

==== Results ====
Each team plays once all other teams in 17 rounds regardless of it being a home or away match.

Home \ Away	AME	ATL	ASL	CAZ	GUA	JUA	LEO	MAZ	MON	NEC	PAC	PUE	QUE	SAN	TIJ	TOL	UNL	UNM
América	—	—	3–2	—	—	—	—	8–0	1–2	6–1	3–0	0–0	0–0	2–1	—	—	—	—
Atlas	0–0	—	2–1	—	—	5–0	—	4–1	3–1	—	—	3–0	3–3	—	2–1	—	—	2–1
Atlético San Luis	—	—	—	3–1	2–2	2–3	2–1	—	—	2–0	0–2	3–1	1–0	—	—	—	—	0–2
Cruz Azul	0–2	4–1	—	—	—	2–0	—	—	1–2	0–2	—	0–1	—	0–0	—	1–3	1–1	—
Guadalajara	1–2	0–3	—	2–0	—	—	—	5–0	—	2–0	2–1	—	3–1	—	3–0	—	—	—
Juárez	0–1	—	—	—	0–4	—	—	—	0–5	1–0	—	—	—	0–2	—	3–2	0–4	0–3
León	1–2	1–5	—	1–1	0–2	1–0	—	—	—	—	1–2	—	1–3	—	—	—	—	3–2
Mazatlán	—	—	1–1	2–0	—	3–2	1–1	—	—	—	—	—	0–3	—	1–0	1–0	1–4	—
Monterrey	—	—	3–1	—	2–4	—	4–1	6–0	—	—	2–2	3–2	—	—	2–1	—	—	1–0
Necaxa	—	0–3	—	—	—	—	2–1	0–1	0–1	—	—	—	—	2–4	1–2	2–1	0–1	—
Pachuca	—	1–3	—	0–0	—	2–2	—	3–0	—	2–0	—	3–1	0–1	—	—	—	0–2	1–4
Puebla	—	—	—	—	0–5	3–0	0–0	0–1	—	0–0	—	—	—	0–0	1–0	2–0	0–3	—
Querétaro	—	—	—	1–2	—	1–1	—	—	1–1	2–0	—	1–1	—	2–1	—	1–0	1–3	0–3
Santos Laguna	—	0–3	2–1	—	0–0	—	1–1	1–1	1–3	—	0–1	—	—	—	0–0	2–0	—	—
Tijuana	1–2	—	2–0	1–1	—	4–1	0–3	—	—	—	2–3	—	0–3	—	—	—	—	0–0
Toluca	1–2	1–3	1–0	—	1–4	—	1–3	—	0–1	—	2–1	—	—	—	2–1	—	1–2	—
UANL	1–0	3–0	4–1	—	4–1	—	3–1	—	1–2	—	—	—	—	4–1	6–1	—	—	4–0
UNAM	1–1	—	—	2–0	1–2	—	—	1–0	—	4–0	—	1–0	—	0–1	—	4–1	—	—

Updated to match(es) played on 20 November 2020. Source: Liga MX Femenil
Legend: Blue = home team win; Yellow = draw; Red = away team win.

=== Regular season statistics ===
==== Top goalscorers ====
Players sorted first by goals scored, then by last name.

Rank	Player	Club	Goals
1	(Mexico) Katty Martínez	UANL	18
2	(Mexico) Alison González	Atlas	17
3	(Mexico) Desirée Monsiváis	Monterrey	13
4	(Mexico) Alicia Cervantes	Guadalajara	12
4	(Mexico) Daniela Espinosa	América	12
6	(Mexico) Stephany Mayor	UANL	10
7	(Mexico) Christina Burkenroad	Monterrey	9
7	(Mexico) Adriana Iturbide	Atlas	9
9	(Mexico) Viridiana Salazar	Pachuca	8
10	(Mexico) Renae Cuéllar	Tijuana	7
10	(Mexico) Casandra Cuevas	América	7

Source:Liga MX Femenil

==== Hat-tricks ====
Player	For	Against	Result	Date	Round	Reference
(Mexico) Casandra Cuevas	América	Necaxa	6 – 1 (H)	3 September 2020	4	
(Mexico) Alicia Cervantes	Guadalajara	Mazatlán	5 – 0 (H)	7 September 2020	4	
(Mexico) Adriana Iturbide	Atlas	Juárez	5 – 0 (H)	18 October 2020	12	

(H) – Home; (A) – Away

=== Liguilla ===
The eight best teams play two games against each other on a home-and-away basis. The higher seeded teams play on their home field during the second leg. The winner of each match up is determined by aggregate score. In the quarterfinals and semifinals, if the two teams are tied on aggregate and on away goals, the higher seeded team advances. In the final, if the two teams are tied after both legs, the match goes to extra time and, if necessary, a penalty shoot-out.

Quarter-finals
1	UANL	2	4	6
8	Pachuca	1	1	2
2	Atlas	2	2	4
7	Querétaro (v.)	1	3	4
3	Monterrey	1	4	5
6	UNAM	1	0	1
4	Guadalajara	0	2	2
5	América	1	2	3

Semi-finals
1	UANL	2	2	4
7	Querétaro	0	0	0
3	Monterrey	4	3	7
5	América	1	2	3

Final
1	UANL (p.)	1	0	1 (3)
3	Monterrey	0	1	1 (2)

==== Quarter-finals ====
The first legs were played on 27 November, and the second legs were played on 30 November 2020.

Team 1	Agg.	Team 2	1st leg	2nd leg
UANL	6–2	Pachuca	2–1	4–1
Atlas	4–4	(v.) Querétaro	2–1	2–3
Monterrey	5–1	UNAM	1–1	4–0
Guadalajara	2–3	América	0–1	2–2

===== First leg =====
27 November 2020	América	1–0	Guadalajara	Mexico City
12:00 CST (UTC−6)	Cuevas 78'	Report		Stadium: Instalaciones Club América en Coapa; Attendance: 0 Referee: Francia María González Martínez

27 November 2020	UNAM	1–1	Monterrey	Mexico City
15:45 CST (UTC−6)	Herrera 88'	Report	Monsiváis 39'	Stadium: Instalaciones de La Cantera; Attendance: 0 Referee: Diana Stephanía Pérez Borja

27 November 2020	Querétaro	1–2	Atlas	Querétaro City, Querétaro
19:00 CST (UTC−6)	Servín 71'	Report	González 30'; García 90+2'	Stadium: Estadio Corregidora; Attendance: 0 Referee: Lucila Venegas Montes

27 November 2020	Pachuca	1–2	UANL	Pachuca, Hidalgo
21:00 CST (UTC−6)	Sierra 76' (o.g.)	Report	Cruz 43'; Martínez 68'	Stadium: Estadio Hidalgo; Attendance: 0 Referee: Martín Gerardo Juárez Jiménez

===== Second leg =====
30 November 2020	Atlas	2–3 (4–4 agg.)	Querétaro	Zapopan, Jalisco
10:00 CST (UTC−6)	Robles 21'; Iturbide 34'	Report	Rodríguez 25', 76'; Orozco 84'	Stadium: Estadio Alfredo "Pistache" Torres; Attendance: 0 Referee: Priscila Eritzel Pérez Borja

30 November 2020	Guadalajara	2–2 (2–3 agg.)	América	Zapopan, Jalisco
17:00 CST (UTC−6)	Cervantes 74'; Gutiérrez 84'	Report	Campa 59'; González 66'	Stadium: Estadio Akron; Attendance: 0 Referee: Katia Itzel García Mendoza

30 November 2020	UANL	4–1 (6–2 agg.)	Pachuca	San Nicolás de los Garza, Nuevo León
19:00 CST (UTC−6)	Mayor 2'; Martínez 12', 19'; Cruz 67'	Report	Balcázar 50'	Stadium: Estadio Universitario; Attendance: 0 Referee: Karen Hernández Andrade

30 November 2020	Monterrey	4–0 (5–1 agg.)	UNAM	Guadalupe, Nuevo León
21:00 CST (UTC−6)	Flores 13'; Monsiváis 47'; García 74'; Simental 90+1'	Report		Stadium: Estadio BBVA; Attendance: 0 Referee: Martín Gerardo Juárez Jiménez

==== Semi-finals ====
The first legs were played on 4 December, and the second legs were played on 7 December 2020.

Team 1	Agg.	Team 2	1st leg	2nd leg
UANL	4–0	Querétaro	2–0	2–0
Monterrey	7–3	América	4–1	3–2

===== First leg =====
4 December 2020	América	1–4	Monterrey	Mexico City
17:00 CST (UTC−6)	Hernández 47'	Report	Burkenroad 19'; Evangelista 31'; Monsiváis 33'; Bernal 75'	Stadium: Estadio Azteca; Attendance: Karen Hernández Andrade; Referee: 0

4 December 2020	Querétaro	0–2	UANL	Querétaro City, Querétaro
19:00 CST (UTC−6)		Report	Martínez 33'; Gómez Junco 64'	Stadium: Estadio Corregidora; Attendance: 0 Referee: Katia Itzel García Mendoza

===== Second leg =====
7 December 2020	UANL	2–0 (4–0 agg.)	Querétaro	San Nicolás de los Garza, Nuevo León
19:00 CST (UTC−6)	Mayor 13'; Gómez Junco 63'	Report		Stadium: Estadio Universitario; Attendance: 0 Referee: Lizzet Amairany García Olvera

7 December 2020	Monterrey	3–2 (7–3 agg.)	América	Guadalupe, Nuevo León
21:00 CST (UTC−6)	Evangelista 11', 74'; Burkenroad 82'	Report	Orejel 33'; Cázares 87'	Stadium: Estadio BBVA; Attendance: 0 Referee: Francia Maria Gonzalez Martinez

==== Final ====
The first leg was played on 11 December, and the second leg was played on 14 December 2020.

Team 1	Agg.	Team 2	1st leg	2nd leg
UANL	(p.) 1–1 (3–2)	Monterrey	1–0	0–1

===== First leg =====
11 December 2020	Monterrey	0–1	UANL	Guadalupe, Nuevo León
21:00 CST (UTC−6)		Report	Ovalle 61'	Stadium: Estadio BBVA; Attendance: 0 Referee: Francia María González Martínez

===== Second leg =====
14 December 2020	UANL	0–1 (1–1 agg.) (3–2 p)	Monterrey	San Nicolás de los Garza, Nuevo León
19:00 CST (UTC−6)		Report	Mejía 90+4'	Stadium: Estadio Universitario; Attendance: 0 Referee: Katia Itzel García Mendoza
	Penalties
	Martínez (penalty scored); Mercado (penalty scored); Antonio (penalty scored); Ferral (penalty missed)		Monsiváis (penalty scored); Burkenroad (penalty missed); Cadena (penalty scored); Valdez (penalty missed)

Guardianes 2020 winners

3rd title

== Torneo Guardianes 2021 ==
The Torneo Guardianes 2021 is the second tournament of the season. The tournament was renamed Torneo Guardianes Clausura 2021 (stylized as Guard1anes) in honor of the job healthcare workers have done during the COVID-19 pandemic in Mexico. The tournament began on 7 January 2021.

=== Regular season ===
==== Standings ====
Pos	Team	Pld	W	D	L	GF	GA	GD	Pts	Qualification or relegation
1	UANL	17	12	4	1	39	12	+27	40	Advance to Liguilla (Note: The first 8 places in the table qualify for the Liguilla.)
2	Guadalajara	17	11	3	3	44	19	+25	36	Advance to Liguilla
3	Atlas	17	10	4	3	30	23	+7	34	Advance to Liguilla
4	Monterrey	17	10	3	4	40	22	+18	33	Advance to Liguilla
5	UNAM	17	9	5	3	24	17	+7	32	Advance to Liguilla
6	Pachuca	17	9	3	5	24	15	+9	30	Advance to Liguilla
7	Toluca	17	8	5	4	17	14	+3	29	Advance to Liguilla
8	América	17	6	6	5	23	22	+1	24	Advance to Liguilla
9	Cruz Azul	17	6	4	7	21	26	−5	22	
10	Santos Laguna	17	5	5	7	24	27	−3	20	
11	Querétaro	17	6	1	10	21	27	−6	19	
12	Tijuana	17	5	3	9	17	20	−3	18	
13	Mazatlán	17	4	6	7	16	25	−9	18	
14	León	17	5	2	10	17	33	−16	17	
15	Necaxa	17	4	4	9	14	29	−15	16	
16	Puebla	17	3	4	10	14	24	−10	13	
17	Juárez	17	3	3	11	15	28	−13	12	
18	Atlético San Luis	17	2	5	10	19	36	−17	11	

Updated to match(es) played on 3 May 2021. Source: Liga MX Femenil
Rules for classification: 1) Points; 2) Goal difference; 3) Number of goals scored; 4) Head-to-head results between tied teams; 5) Number of goals scored away; 6) Highest relegation coefficient; 7) Fair Play points

==== Positions by Round ====
Qualification to quarter-finals
Last place in table

Team ╲ Round	1	2	3	4	5	6	7	8	9	10	11	12	13	14	15	16	17
UANL	2	7	7	5	5	4	3	2	1	1	1	1	1	1	1	1	1
Guadalajara	5	3	2	6	6	5	4	3	3	3	4	4	2	2	2	2	2
Atlas	8	5	4	1	3	2	2	1	2	2	2	2	3	3	3	3	3
Monterrey	1	1	6	4	4	3	5	5	5	5	3	3	4	4	4	4	4
UNAM	6	2	1	2	1	1	1	4	4	4	5	5	5	5	5	5	5
Pachuca	17	16	14	11	11	8	10	8	8	11	7	7	7	6	6	7	6
Toluca	3	4	3	3	2	6	6	7	7	6	9	9	8	7	7	6	7
América	12	11	9	9	7	7	7	6	6	8	8	8	9	9	9	8	8
Cruz Azul	4	6	5	7	9	10	8	10	9	7	6	6	6	8	8	9	9
Santos Laguna (Note: A pending match between weeks 1 and 8)	10	8	12	14	14	14	15	15	16	15	12	12	12	12	12	11	10
Querétaro	11	9	11	13	13	13	13	9	12	12	13	13	15	13	14	13	11
Tijuana	13	14	16	12	12	12	9	11	10	9	11	11	11	11	11	15	12
Mazatlán	7	10	8	8	8	11	12	12	11	10	10	10	10	10	10	10	13
León	15	12	10	10	10	9	11	13	14	14	16	16	14	16	13	12	14
Necaxa	16	18	18	17	17	17	18	18	17	18	15	15	16	14	15	14	15
Puebla	9	15	15	15	15	15	17	17	18	17	17	17	18	18	17	17	16
Juárez	14	13	13	16	16	16	14	14	15	16	18	18	17	17	18	18	17
Atlético San Luis	18	17	17	18	18	18	16	16	13	13	14	14	13	15	16	16	18

Updated to match(es) played on 3 May 2021. Source: Liga MX Femenil

==== Results ====
Each team plays once all other teams in 17 rounds regardless of it being a home or away match.

Home \ Away	AME	ATL	ASL	CAZ	GUA	JUA	LEO	MAZ	MON	NEC	PAC	PUE	QUE	SAN	TIJ	TOL	UNL	UNM
América	—	1–2	—	2–1	2–4	2–1	1–1	—	—	—	—	—	—	—	1–2	2–2	2–2	3–1
Atlas	—	—	—	0–1	3–3	—	2–1	—	—	3–1	3–3	—	—	3–2	—	1–2	2–1	—
Atlético San Luis	1–0	1–2	—	—	—	—	—	3–0	0–5	—	—	—	—	2–2	3–5	1–2	0–0	—
Cruz Azul	—	—	3–1	—	0–1	—	1–1	3–0	—	—	2–1	—	2–5	—	0–0	—	—	0–2
Guadalajara	—	—	3–0	—	—	2–0	5–1	—	5–0	—	—	3–0	—	2–0	—	1–1	3–4	4–1
Juárez	—	1–2	1–1	1–2	—	—	2–1	0–1	—	—	1–1	1–2	2–0	—	1–2	—	—	—
León	—	—	3–2	—	—	—	—	1–2	0–3	2–1	—	2–1	—	2–1	2–1	0–2	0–4	—
Mazatlán	1–1	2–2	—	—	1–2	—	—	—	0–3	2–0	0–2	1–1	—	2–3	—	—	—	0–0
Monterrey	1–1	3–1	—	5–1	—	3–4	—	—	—	5–0	—	—	2–0	2–2	—	1–0	2–2	—
Necaxa	0–1	—	1–1	0–2	0–2	2–0	—	—	—	—	1–0	3–2	1–0	—	—	—	—	1–1
Pachuca	0–0	—	4–1	—	1–0	—	2–0	—	1–0	—	—	—	—	1–2	2–1	2–0	—	—
Puebla	1–0	0–1	2–0	1–1	—	—	—	—	2–3	—	0–1	—	0–1	—	—	—	—	0–3
Querétaro	1–2	0–1	3–2	—	3–3	—	1–0	1–2	—	—	0–3	—	—	—	2–1	—	—	—
Santos Laguna	1–2	—	—	2–1	—	3–0	—	—	—	2–2	—	0–0	1–2	—	—	—	0–3	2–2
Tijuana	—	0–1	—	—	2–1	—	—	0–0	0–2	3–0	—	0–0	—	0–1	—	0–1	0–1	—
Toluca	—	—	—	1–1	—	0–0	—	1–0	—	1–1	—	2–1	1–0	1–0	—	—	—	0–1
UANL	—	—	—	3–0	—	3–0	—	2–2	—	2–0	3–0	2–1	1–0	—	—	2–0	—	—
UNAM	—	1–1	0–0	—	—	1–0	2–0	—	3–0	—	1–0	—	3–2	—	2–0	—	0–4	—

Updated to match(es) played on 3 May 2021. Source: Liga MX Femenil
Legend: Blue = home team win; Yellow = draw; Red = away team win.

=== Regular season statistics ===
==== Top goalscorers ====
Players sorted first by goals scored, then by last name.

Rank	Player	Club	Goals
1	(Mexico) Alison González	Atlas	18
2	(Mexico) Alicia Cervantes	Guadalajara	17
3	(Mexico) Renae Cuéllar	Tijuana	11
3	(Mexico) Daniela Solís	Monterrey	11
5	(Mexico) Stephany Mayor	UANL	10
6	(Mexico) Aylín Avilez	Monterrey	9
7	(Mexico) Alejandra Curiel	Cruz Azul	8
7	(Mexico) Joseline Montoya	Guadalajara	8
7	(Mexico) Cinthya Peraza	Santos Laguna	8
10	(Mexico) Christina Burkenroad	Monterrey	7
10	(Mexico) Katty Martínez	UANL	7
10	(Mexico) Alexxandra Ramírez	Santos Laguna	7
10	(Mexico) Viridiana Salazar	Pachuca	7

Source:Liga MX Femenil

==== Hat-tricks ====
Player	For	Against	Result	Date	Round	Reference
(Mexico) Renae Cuéllar	Tijuana	Atlético San Luis	3 – 5 (A)	31 January 2021	4	
(Mexico) Alicia Cervantes	Guadalajara	León	5 – 1 (H)	28 February 2021	8	
(Mexico) Alicia Cervantes	Guadalajara	Puebla	3 – 0 (H)	21 March 2021	12	
(Mexico) Joseline Montoya	Guadalajara	Monterrey	5 – 0 (H)	26 April 2021	16	

(H) – Home; (A) – Away

== Attendance ==
=== Highest and lowest ===
Highest attended					Lowest attended			
Week	Home	Score	Away	Attendance	Home	Score	Away	Attendance
1	No matches with fans in attendance							
2	No matches with fans in attendance							
3	No matches with fans in attendance							
4	No matches with fans in attendance							
5	No matches with fans in attendance							
6	No matches with fans in attendance							
7	No matches with fans in attendance							
8	No matches with fans in attendance							
9	No matches with fans in attendance							
10	Mazatlán	2–0	Necaxa	2,180	N/A			
11	Mazatlán	1–1	Puebla	787	N/A			
12	Pachuca	0–0	América	2,332	N/A			
13	Mazatlán	0–0	UNAM	1,698	N/A			
14	Pachuca	2–1	Tijuana	611	N/A			
15	Monterrey	1–1	América	932	Mazatlán	0–2	Pachuca	357
16	UANL	2–2	Mazatlán	3,329	N/A			
17	Monterrey	3–1	Atlas	1,525	Guadalajara	3–4	UANL	235

Source: Liga MX Femenil

1. Does not include matches played behind closed doors.

=== Liguilla ===
The eight best teams play two games against each other on a home-and-away basis. The higher seeded teams play on their home field during the second leg. The winner of each match up is determined by aggregate score. In the quarterfinals and semifinals, if the two teams are tied on aggregate and on away goals, the higher seeded team advances. In the final, if the two teams are tied after both legs, the match goes to extra time and, if necessary, a penalty shoot-out.

Quarter-finals
1	UANL	4	2	6
8	América	0	0	0
4	Monterrey	2	2	4
5	UNAM	1	1	2
2	Guadalajara	1	3	4
7	Toluca	0	0	0
3	Atlas	2	3	5
6	Pachuca	0	1	1

Semi-finals
1	UANL	2	4	6
4	Monterrey	2	1	3
2	Guadalajara	0	2	2
3	Atlas	0	1	1

Final
1	UANL	2	5	7
2	Guadalajara	1	3	4

==== Quarter-finals ====
The first legs will be played on 7 May, and the second legs were played on 10 May 2021.

Team 1	Agg.	Team 2	1st leg	2nd leg
UANL	6–0	América	4–0	2–0
Monterrey	4–2	UNAM	2–1	2–1
Guadalajara	4–0	Toluca	1–0	3–0
Atlas	5–1	Pachuca	2–0	3–1

===== First leg =====
7 May 2021	América	0–4	UANL	Mexico City
10:00 CDT (UTC−5)		Report	Cruz 8', 46'; Mayor 18'; Ovalle 61'	Stadium: Instalaciones Club América en Coapa; Attendance: 0 Referee: Priscila Eritzel Pérez Borja

7 May 2021	UNAM	1–2	Monterrey	Mexico City
12:00 CDT (UTC−5)	Garza 60'	Report	Mejia 17'; Monsiváis 30'	Stadium: Estadio Olímpico Universitario; Attendance: 0 Referee: Salvador Pérez Villalobos

7 May 2021	Toluca	0–1	Guadalajara	Metepec, State of Mexico
16:00 CDT (UTC−5)		Report	Vázquez 45+1'	Stadium: Instalaciones de Metepec; Attendance: 0 Referee: Katia Itzel García Mendoza

7 May 2021	Pachuca	0–2	Atlas	Pachuca, Hidalgo
18:30 CDT (UTC−5)		Report	Pérez 45+2'; Robles 65'	Stadium: Estadio Hidalgo; Attendance: 700; Referee: Francia María González Martínez

===== Second leg =====
10 May 2021	Atlas	3–1 (5–1 agg.)	Pachuca	Zapopan, Jalisco
16:00 CDT (UTC−5)	González 43', 63'; Arce 58'	Report	Salazar 71'	Stadium: Estadio Alfredo "Pistache" Torres; Attendance: 0 Referee: Diana Stephanía Pérez Borja

10 May 2021	Guadalajara	3–0 (4–0 agg.)	Toluca	Zapopan, Jalisco
18:00 CDT (UTC−5)	Cervantes 50', 81'; Valenzuela 86'	Report		Stadium: Estadio Akron; Attendance: 591; Referee: Karen Hernández Andrade

10 May 2021	UANL	2–0 (6–0 agg.)	América	San Nicolás de los Garza, Nuevo León
20:00 CDT (UTC−5)	Elizondo 82'; Cruz 88'	Report		Stadium: Estadio Universitario; Attendance: 6,536; Referee: Lizzet Amairany García Olvera

10 May 2021	Monterrey	2–1 (4–2 agg.)	UNAM	Guadalupe, Nuevo León
21:30 CDT (UTC−5)	Monsiváis 49'; Burkenroad 67'	Report	Cagigas 32'	Stadium: Estadio BBVA; Attendance: 1,971; Referee: Lucila Venegas Montes

==== Semi-finals ====
The first legs will be played on 14 May, and the second legs will be played on 17 May 2021.

Team 1	Agg.	Team 2	1st leg	2nd leg
UANL	6–3	Monterrey	2–2	4–1
Guadalajara	2–1	Atlas	0–0	2–1

===== First leg =====
14 May 2021	Atlas	0–0	Guadalajara	Guadalajara, Jalisco
17:00 CDT (UTC−5)		Report		Stadium: Estadio Jalisco; Attendance: 3,837; Referee: Lucila Venegas Montes

14 May 2021	Monterrey	2–2	UANL	Guadalupe, Nuevo León
21:05 CDT (UTC−5)	Burkenroad 52'; Monsiváis 71'	Report	Antonio 47'; Solís 90+1'	Stadium: Estadio BBVA; Attendance: 12,043; Referee: Salvador Pérez Villalobos

===== Second leg =====
17 May 2021	UANL	4–1 (6–3 agg.)	Monterrey	San Nicolás de los Garza, Nuevo León
19:00 CDT (UTC−5)	Mayor 4'; Cruz 17'; Antonio 50'; Ovalle 55'	Report	Evangelista 25'	Stadium: Estadio Universitario; Attendance: 11,472; Referee: Karen Hernández Andrade

17 May 2021	Guadalajara	2–1 (2–1 agg.)	Atlas	Zapopan, Jalisco
21:00 CDT (UTC−5)	Castillo 45+1'; García 71' (own)	Report	González 90+4' (pen.)	Stadium: Estadio Akron; Attendance: 7,691; Referee: Lizzet Amairany García Olvera

==== Final ====
The first leg was played on 24 May, and the second leg was played on 31 May 2021.

Team 1	Agg.	Team 2	1st leg	2nd leg
UANL	7–4	Guadalajara	2–1	5–3

===== First leg =====
24 May 2021	Guadalajara	1–2	UANL	Zapopan, Jalisco
21:00 CDT (UTC−5)	Vázquez 50'	Report	Mayor 13'; Espinoza 90+4'	Stadium: Estadio Akron; Attendance: 11,564; Referee: Lizzet Amairany García Olvera

===== Second leg =====
31 May 2021	UANL	5–3 (7–4 agg.)	Guadalajara	San Nicolás de los Garza, Nuevo León
19:00 CDT (UTC−5)	Ovalle 7', 12'; Mayor 14', 90'; Solís 89'	Report	García 40'; Jaramillo 57'; Valenzuela 90+3'	Stadium: Estadio Universitario; Attendance: 14,851; Referee: Karen Hernández Andrade

Guardianes 2021 winners

4th title

== Campeón de Campeonas ==
On May 24, 2021, the Liga MX Owners Assembly made official the creation of the Campeón de Campeonas ("Champion of Women's Champions"), a tournament between the two winning teams of the season's tournaments made with the goal of premiering the best team in all the annual cycle of Mexican women's football.

It was not played this season because UANL won both championships that were played in the year.

2020–21 winners

1st title
