= 2020–21 Tigres UANL (women) season =

UANL
2020–21 season
- Chairman: Alejandro Rodríguez Michelsen
- Manager: Roberto Medina
- Stadium: Estadio Universitario
- Apertura: Winners (1st)
- Top goalscorer: Katty Martínez (29 goals)
- Biggest win: UANL 6–1 Tijuana (6 September 2020)
- Biggest defeat: UANL 1–2 Monterrey (14 November 2020)
Home colours	Away colours

The 2020–21 season is UANL's fourth competitive season and fourth season in the Liga MX Femenil, the top flight of Mexican women's football.

Due to the COVID-19 pandemic, Liga MX Femenil's start was delayed for August 2020.

== Squad ==
=== Apertura ===
No.	Nat.	Name	Date of birth (age)	Since
Goalkeepers
1	(Mexico)	Alejandra Gutiérrez	9 September 1994 (aged 25)	2018
20	(Mexico)	Ofelia Solís	27 February 1996 (aged 24)	2017
33	(Mexico)	Vania Villalobos	6 November 2003 (aged 16)	2018
34	(Mexico)	Karla Zozaya	30 September 2004 (aged 15)	2020
Defenders
2	(Mexico)	Akemi Yokoyama	28 October 1999 (aged 20)	2017
3	(Mexico)	Bianca Sierra	25 June 1992 (aged 28)	2020
4	(Mexico)	Greta Espinoza	5 June 1995 (aged 25)	2018
13	(Mexico)	Karen Luna	12 February 1998 (aged 22)	2017
15	(Mexico)	Cristina Ferral	16 February 1993 (aged 27)	2018
17	(Mexico)	Natalia Villarreal	19 March 1998 (aged 22)	2017
22	(Mexico)	Selene Cortés	3 October 1998 (aged 21)	2017
31	(Mexico)	Natalia Miramontes	2 March 2002 (aged 18)	2018
35	(Mexico)	Angélica Murillo	14 February 2004 (aged 16)	2020
Midfielders
6	(Mexico)	Nancy Antonio	2 April 1996 (aged 24)	2017
7	(Mexico)	Liliana Mercado (Captain)	22 October 1988 (aged 31)	2017
11	(Mexico)	Nayeli Rangel	28 February 1992 (aged 28)	2017
14	(Mexico)	Lizbeth Ovalle	19 October 1999 (aged 20)	2017
18	(Mexico)	Belén Cruz	7 November 1998 (aged 21)	2017
21	(Mexico)	Natalia Gómez Junco	9 August 1992 (aged 28)	2019
32	(Mexico)	Mariana Elizondo	10 October 2002 (aged 17)	2017
Forwards
5	(Mexico)	Fernanda Elizondo	27 July 1991 (aged 29)	2018
9	(Mexico)	Stephany Mayor	23 September 1991 (aged 28)	2020
10	(Mexico)	Katty Martínez	14 March 1998 (aged 22)	2017
19	(Mexico)	Blanca Solís	30 April 1996 (aged 24)	2017
25	(Mexico)	Azucena Martínez	14 September 2003 (aged 16)	2020
30	(Mexico)	Miah Zuazua	27 April 1999 (aged 21)	2019
36	(Mexico)	Yenifer García	11 July 2003 (aged 17)	2020

- Last updated: 18 August 2020
- Source: Liga MX Femenil

== Transfers ==
=== In ===
Pos.	Player	Moving from	Transfer window	Ref.
MF	(Mexico) María Sánchez	Guadalajara	Winter	

=== Out ===
Pos.	Player	Moving to	Transfer window	Ref.
MF	(Mexico) Carolina Jaramillo	Guadalajara	Summer	
MF	(Mexico) Vanessa González	Atlas	Summer	
FW	(Mexico) Brenda Viramontes	León	Summer	
MF	(Mexico) Sonia Vázquez	León	Summer	
MF	(Mexico) Perla Navarrete	Santos Laguna	Summer	

== Coaching staff ==
Position	Staff
Manager	(Mexico) Roberto Medina
Assistant manager	(Mexico) Karina Báez
Fitness coach	(Mexico) Diego Fernández
Physiotherapist	(Mexico) Linda Montemayor
Team doctor	(Mexico) Nancy Guevara

== Competitions ==
=== Overview ===
Competition	First match	Last match	Starting round	Final position	Record							
Competition	First match	Last match	Starting round	Final position	Pld	W	D	L	GF	GA	GD	Win %
Apertura	17 August 2020	14 December 2020	Matchday 1	Winners	23	20	1	2	61	14	+47	86.96
Clausura	11 January 2021				18	13	4	1	41	9	+32	72.22
Total					41	33	5	3	102	23	+79	80.49

Source: Competitions

=== Torneo Apertura ===
==== League table ====
Pos	Team	Pld	W	D	L	GF	GA	GD	Pts	Qualification or relegation
1	UANL (C)	17	15	1	1	50	11	+39	46	Advance to Liguilla (Note: The first 8 places in the table qualify for the Liguilla. The last ranked team in the relegation table can qualify for the liguilla in the Apertura tournament.)
2	Atlas	17	13	2	2	45	18	+27	41	Advance to Liguilla
3	Monterrey	17	13	2	2	41	19	+22	41	Advance to Liguilla
4	Guadalajara	17	12	2	3	42	17	+25	38	Advance to Liguilla
5	América	17	11	4	2	35	12	+23	37	Advance to Liguilla

Updated to match(es) played on 20 November 2020. Source: Liga MX Femenil
Rules for classification: 1) Points; 2) Goal difference; 3) Number of goals scored; 4) Head-to-head results between tied teams; 5) Number of goals scored away; 6) Highest relegation coefficient; 7) Fair Play points
(C) Champions

==== Matches ====
17 August 2020 1	Toluca	1–2	UANL	Metepec, State of Mexico
16:00	Carvajal 42'	Report	Mayor 31' (pen.); Ovalle 90'	Stadium: Metepec Training Center; Referee: Francia González

22 August 2020 2	Mazatlán	1–4	UANL	Mazatlán, Sinaloa
9:00 (UTC−6)	Hernández 5'	Report	Martínez 12', 45+2'; Ovalle 53'; F. Elizondo 68'	Stadium: Estadio Mazatlán; Referee: Vicente Reynoso

30 August 2020 3	UANL	4–1	Santos Laguna	San Nicolás de los Garza, Nuevo León
9:30	Delgado 10' (o.g.); Martínez 16', 23'; Ovalle 41'	Report	Villanueva 87'	Stadium: Estadio Universitario; Referee: Ricardo Chávez

6 September 2020 4	UANL	6–1	Tijuana	San Nicolás de los Garza, Nuevo León
9:30	Mayor 18'; Villarreal 20'; Mercado 40'; Martínez 62' (pen.), 67'; Gómez Junco 90'	Report	Hernández 14'	Stadium: Estadio Universitario; Referee: Priscila Pérez

11 September 2020 5	Cruz Azul	1–1	UANL	Ciudad Cooperativa, Hidalgo
16:00	León 14'	Report	Mayor 87'	Stadium: Estadio 10 de Diciembre; Referee: Jaime Montes

17 September 2020 6	UANL	4–1	Atlético San Luis	San Nicolás de los Garza, Nuevo León
19:00	Martínez 5'; Cruz 15'; Mayor 35', 57'	Report	Izaguirre 70'	Stadium: Estadio Universitario; Referee: Jesús Alejandro Pérez De León

21 September 2020 7	Querétaro	1–3	UANL	Querétaro City, Querétaro
16:00	Camargo 11'	Report	Sierra 34'; Cruz 55'; Martínez 62' (pen.)	Stadium: Estadio Corregidora; Referee: Lizzet García

27 September 2020 8	UANL	4–0	UNAM	San Nicolás de los Garza, Nuevo León
9:30	Martínez 37' (pen.), 87'; Mercado 90+3'; Elizondo 90+4'	Report		Stadium: Estadio Universitario; Referee: Priscila Pérez

5 October 2020 9	Pachuca	0–2	UANL	Pachuca, Hidalgo
19:00		Report	Elizondo 84'; Mayor 90+3'	Stadium: Estadio Hidalgo; Referee: Katia García

10 September 2020 10	UANL	1–0	América	San Nicolás de los Garza, Nuevo León
19:00	Cruz 28'	Report		Stadium: Estadio Universitario; Referee: Lizzet García

14 October 2020 11	Necaxa	0–1	UANL	Aguascalientes City, Aguascalientes
17:00		Report	Mayor 72'	Stadium: Estadio Victoria; Referee: Natasha Galán

18 October 2020 12	UANL	3–1	León	San Nicolás de los Garza, Nuevo León
9:30	Martínez 48'; Cruz 53'; Yokoyama 57'	Report	Cuevas 76'	Stadium: Estadio Universitario; Referee: Felipe Moreno

1 November 2020 13	Puebla	0–3	UANL	Puebla City, Puebla
12:00		Report	Elizondo 33'; Gómez Junco 45'; Martínez 82'	Stadium: Estadio Cuauhtémoc; Referee: Itzel Hernández

5 November 2020 14	UANL	3–0	Atlas	San Nicolás de los Garza, Nuevo León
19:00	Ovalle 13'; Martínez 58'; Mayor 70'	Report		Stadium: Estadio Universitario; Referee: Katia García

9 November 2020 15	Juárez	0–4	UANL	Ciudad Juárez, Chihuahua
17:00		Report	Mayor 12'; Antonio 31'; Martínez 42', 63'	Stadium: Estadio Olímpico Benito Juárez; Referee: Natasha Galán

14 November 2020 16	UANL	1–2	Monterrey	San Nicolás de los Garza, Nuevo León
19:00	Martínez 31' (pen.)	Report	Burkenroad 14'; Bernal 24'	Stadium: Estadio Universitario; Referee: Lucila Venegas

20 November 2020 17	UANL	4–1	Guadalajara	San Nicolás de los Garza, Nuevo León
18:00	Mayor 13'; Cruz 66'; Martínez 88', 90+3'	Report	Pérez 79' (pen.)	Stadium: Estadio Universitario; Referee: Priscila Pérez

==== Playoffs ====
===== Quarterfinals =====
27 November 2020 First leg	Pachuca	1–2	UANL	Pachuca, Hidalgo
21:00	Sierra 76' (o.g.)	Report	Cruz 43'; Martínez 68'	Stadium: Estadio Hidalgo; Referee: Martín Juárez

30 November 2020 Second leg	UANL	4–1 (6–2 agg.)	Pachuca	San Nicolás de los Garza, Nuevo León
19:00	Mayor 2'; Martínez 12', 19'; Cruz 67'	Report	Balcázar 50'	Stadium: Estadio Universitario; Referee: Karen Hernández

===== Semifinals =====
4 December 2020 First leg	Querétaro	0–2	UANL	Querétaro City, Querétaro
19:00		Report	Martínez 33'; Gómez Junco 64'	Stadium: Estadio Corregidora; Referee: Katia García

7 December 2020 Second leg	UANL	2–0 (4–0 agg.)	Querétaro	San Nicolás de los Garza, Nuevo León
19:00	Mayor 13'; Gómez Junco 64'	Report		Stadium: Estadio Universitario; Referee: Lizzet García

===== Final =====
11 December 2020 First leg	Monterrey	0–1	UANL	Guadalupe, Nuevo León
19:00		Report	Ovalle 61'	Stadium: Estadio BBVA Bancomer; Referee: Francia González

14 December 2020 Second leg	UANL	0–1 (1–1 agg.) (3–2 p)	Monterrey	San Nicolás de los Garza, Nuevo León
19:00		Report	Mejía 90+3'	Stadium: Estadio Universitario; Referee: Katia García
	Penalties
	Martínez (penalty scored); Mercado (penalty scored); Antonio (penalty scored); Ferral (penalty missed)		(penalty scored) Monsiváis; (penalty missed) Burkenroad; (penalty scored) Cadena; (penalty missed) Valdez; (penalty missed) Franco

=== Torneo Clausura ===
==== League table ====
Pos	Team	Pld	W	D	L	GF	GA	GD	Pts	Qualification or relegation
1	UANL	17	12	4	1	39	12	+27	40	Advance to Liguilla (Note: The first 8 places in the table qualify for the Liguilla. The last ranked team in the relegation table can qualify for the liguilla in the Apertura tournament.)
2	Guadalajara	17	11	3	3	44	19	+25	36	Advance to Liguilla
3	Atlas	17	10	4	3	30	23	+7	34	Advance to Liguilla
4	Monterrey	17	10	3	4	40	22	+18	33	Advance to Liguilla
5	UNAM	17	9	5	3	24	17	+7	32	Advance to Liguilla

Updated to match(es) played on 3 May 2021. Source: Liga MX Femenil
Rules for classification: 1) Points; 2) Goal difference; 3) Number of goals scored; 4) Head-to-head results between tied teams; 5) Number of goals scored away; 6) Highest relegation coefficient; 7) Fair Play points

==== Matches ====
11 January 2021 1	UANL	3–0	Pachuca	San Nicolás de los Garza, Nuevo León
19:00	Espinoza 4'; Martínez 75' (pen.); Mayor 79'	Report		Stadium: Estadio Universitario; Attendance: 0 Referee: Felipe Moreno

16 January 2021 2	Atlas	2–1	UANL	Zapopan, Jalisco
10:00	González 9', 51'	Report	Martínez 61'	Stadium: Estadio Alfredo "Pistache" Torres; Attendance: 0 Referee: Priscila Pérez

25 January 2021 3	UANL	2–1	Puebla	San Nicolás de los Garza, Nuevo León
19:00	Martínez 1'; Solís 87'	Report	Cázares 15'	Stadium: Estadio Universitario; Attendance: 0 Referee: Natasha Galán

1 February 2021 4	Santos Laguna	0–3	UANL	Torreón, Coahuila
19:00		Report	Martínez 44'; Peraza 64' (o.g.); Mayor 85'	Stadium: Estadio Corona; Attendance: 0 Referee: Lizzet García

5 February 2021 5	Atlético San Luis	0–0	UANL	San Luis Potosí City, San Luis Potosí
16:00		Report		Stadium: Estadio Alfonso Lastras; Attendance: 0 Referee: Francia González

8 February 2021 6	UANL	2–0	Necaxa	San Nicolás de los Garza, Nuevo León
19:00	Martínez 46'; Mayor 90+2'	Report		Stadium: Estadio Universitario; Attendance: 0 Referee: Katia García

15 February 2021 7	León	0–4	UANL	León, Guanajuato
17:00		Report	Mayor 11'; Martínez 20', 28'; Sánchez 61'	Stadium: Estadio León; Attendance: 0 Referee: Karen Hernández

1 March 2021 8	UANL	2–0	Toluca	San Nicolás de los Garza, Nuevo León
19:00	Sánchez 19'; Mayor 75'	Report		Stadium: Estadio Universitario; Attendance: 0 Referee: Felipe Moreno

6 March 2021 9	UNAM	0–4	UANL	Coyoacán, Mexico City
12:00		Report	Solís 4'; Cruz 13'; Mayor 20'; Sánchez 70'	Stadium: La Cantera; Referee: Karen Hernández

10 March 2021 10	UANL	1–0	Querétaro	San Nicolás de los Garza, Nuevo León
19:00	Cruz 37'	Report		Stadium: Estadio Universitario; Attendance: 0 Referee: Héctor Solorio

15 March 2021 11	América	2–2	UANL	Tlalpan, Mexico City
19:00	Hernández 29'; Espinosa 51'	Report	Mayor 41' (pen.); Mercado 57' (pen.)	Stadium: Estadio Azteca; Attendance: 0 Referee: Katia García

22 March 2021 12	UANL	3–0	Juárez	San Nicolás de los Garza, Nuevo León
20:30	Zuazua 53' (o.g.); Elizondo 89'; Cruz 90+2'	Report		Stadium: Estadio Universitario; Attendance: 0 Referee: Martín Juárez

29 March 2021 13	Monterrey	2–2	UANL	Guadalupe, Nuevo León
21:00	Burkenroad 21'; Bernal 72'	Report	Ovalle 43'; Cadena 47' (o.g.)	Stadium: Estadio BBVA; Attendance: 0 Referee: Priscila Pérez

5 April 2021 14	UANL	3–0	Cruz Azul	San Nicolás de los Garza, Nuevo León
19.00	Mayor 1'; Antonio 49'; Solís 86'	Report		Stadium: Estadio Universitario; Attendance: 0 Referee: Natasha Galán

19 April 2021 15	Tijuana	0–1	UANL	Tijuana, Baja California
17:00 (UTC−7)		Report	Cruz 14'	Stadium: Estadio Caliente; Attendance: 0 Referee: Katia García

26 April 2021 16	UANL	2–2	Mazatlán	San Nicolás de los Garza, Nuevo León
19.00	Cruz 35'; Ovalle 62'	Report	Hernández 40'; Montero 59'	Stadium: Estadio Universitario; Attendance: 0 Referee: Salvador Pérez

==== Playoffs ====
===== Quarterfinals =====
7 May 2021 First leg	América	0–4	UANL	Coyoacán, Mexico City
10:00		Report	Cruz 8', 46'; Mayor 18'; Ovalle 61'	Stadium: Club América; Referee: Priscila Pérez

10 May 2021 Second leg	UANL	2–0 (6–0 agg.)	América	San Nicolás de los Garza, Nuevo León
20:00	Elizondo 82'; Cruz 88'	Report		Stadium: Estadio Universitario; Referee: Lizzet García

== Statistics ==
=== Goalscorers ===
Rank	Pos.	No.	Player	Apertura	Clausura	Total
1	FW	10	(Mexico) Katty Martínez	22	7	29
2	FW	9	(Mexico) Stephany Mayor	12	12	24
3	MF	18	(Mexico) Belén Cruz	7	5	12
4	MF	14	(Mexico) Lizbeth Ovalle	5	3	8
5	FW	5	(Mexico) Fernanda Elizondo	4	2	6
6	MF	21	(Mexico) Natalia Gómez Junco	4	0	4
7	MF	7	(Mexico) Liliana Mercado	2	1	3
7	FW	19	(Mexico) Blanca Solís	0	3	3
7	MF	24	(Mexico) María Sánchez	0	3	3
10	MF	6	(Mexico) Nancy Antonio	1	1	2
11	DF	2	(Mexico) Akemi Yokoyama	1	0	1
11	DF	3	(Mexico) Bianca Sierra	1	0	1
11	DF	4	(Mexico) Greta Espinoza	0	1	1
11	DF	17	(Mexico) Natalia Villarreal	1	0	1
Own goals				1	3	4
Total				61	41	102

=== Own goals ===
Player	Against	Result	Date	Competition	Ref.
(Mexico) Bianca Sierra	Pachuca	2–1 (A)	27 November 2020	Liga MX Femenil	
