= Karla García =

Mexican footballer (born 2001)

Personal information
- Full name: Karla Vianey García Muñoz
- Date of birth: 22 August 2001 (age 25)
- Place of birth: Guadalajara, Jalisco, Mexico
- Height: 1.62 m (5 ft 4 in)
- Position: Left back

Team information
- Current team: Atlético San Luis
- Number: 2

Senior career*
Years	Team	Apps	(Gls)
2018–2022	Atlas	56	(0)
2022–2025	Querétaro	92	(0)
2025–	Atlético San Luis	2	(0)

International career^{‡}
2018	Mexico U-17		
- * Club domestic league appearances and goals as of 4 June 2023 ‡ National team caps and goals as of 12 March 2022

Karla Vianey García Muñoz (born 22 August 2001) is a Mexican professional footballer who plays as a Left back for Liga MX Femenil side Atlético San Luis.

== Club career ==
In 2018, she started her career in Atlas. In 2022, she signed with Querétaro. In 2025, she joined Atlético San Luis.
