= Carla Rossi =

Mexican footballer and manager (born 1985)

Personal information
- Full name: Carla Rossi Balado
- Date of birth: 11 May 1985 (age 41)
- Place of birth: Guadalajara, Jalisco, Mexico
- Height: 1.70 m (5 ft 7 in)

Senior career*
Years	Team	Apps	(Gls)
2004–2008	UdeG (women)		
2015	Tijuana (women)		

International career
2004–2008	Mexico		

Managerial career
- 2010: UdeG (women)
- 2016–2017: UdeG (women)
- 2017–2018: Tijuana (women) (assistant)
- 2019–2020: Tijuana (women)
- 2020–2022: Querétaro (women)
- 2023–2025: Monterrey (assistant)
- * Club domestic league appearances and goals

Carla Rossi Balado (born 11 May 1985) is a Mexican football manager and former player. She was manager of Querétaro F.C. (women). During her career as player she represented Mexico from 2004 to 2008.

== Playing career ==
=== Early career ===
Carla Rossi was born in Guadalajara, Jalisco on 11 May 1985, her father is Italian and her mother from Argentina.

Rossi played collegiately at the Universidad de Guadalajara.

=== Club career ===
When Club Tijuana established its female section in 2015 to play in the Women's Premier Soccer League, Rossi was part of the team.

=== International career ===
Rossi represented Mexico from 2004 to 2008.

== Managerial career ==
Rossi was part of Andrea Rodebaugh's staff in Tijuana and assumed the head coach position for the 2019–20 season when Rodebaugh left for a job at the FIFA as Development Official for the Americas.

With Xolos, Rossi managed to qualify the team to the playoffs for the first time in the club's history. In May 2020, Rossi left Tijuana and was replaced by Franky Oviedo.

In June 2020, Rossi was presented as the new manager of Querétaro Women. In her first tournament with Querétaro, the team finished in fourth place.

== Managerial statistics ==
As of 24 August 2020

Managerial record by team and tenure
Team	From	To	Record								Ref
Team	From	To	G	W	D	L	GF	GA	GD	Win %	Ref
Tijuana (women)	20 June 2019	25 May 2020	29	12	7	10	42	37	+5	41.38	
Querétaro (women)	12 June 2020	Present	2	0	1	1	1	2	−1	0.00	
Total			31	12	8	11	43	39	+4	38.71	
