= Leidy Ramos =

Mexican footballer (born 1999)

Personal information
- Full name: Leidy Lizeth Ramos Martínez
- Date of birth: 11 June 1999 (age 27)
- Place of birth: Guadalajara, Jalisco, Mexico
- Height: 1.48 m (4 ft 10 in)
- Position: Forward

Team information
- Current team: Querétaro
- Number: 13

Senior career*
Years	Team	Apps	(Gls)
2017–2019	Atlas	24	(0)
2020–	Querétaro	172	(21)
- * Club domestic league appearances and goals as of 5 February 2026 ‡ National team caps and goals as of 12 March 2022

Leidy Lizeth Ramos Martínez (born 11 June 1999) is a Mexican professional footballer who plays as a forward for Liga MX Femenil side Querétaro.

== Career ==
In 2018, she started her career in Atlas. In 2020, she was transferred to Querétaro.
