= Joana Robles =

Mexican footballer (born 1994)

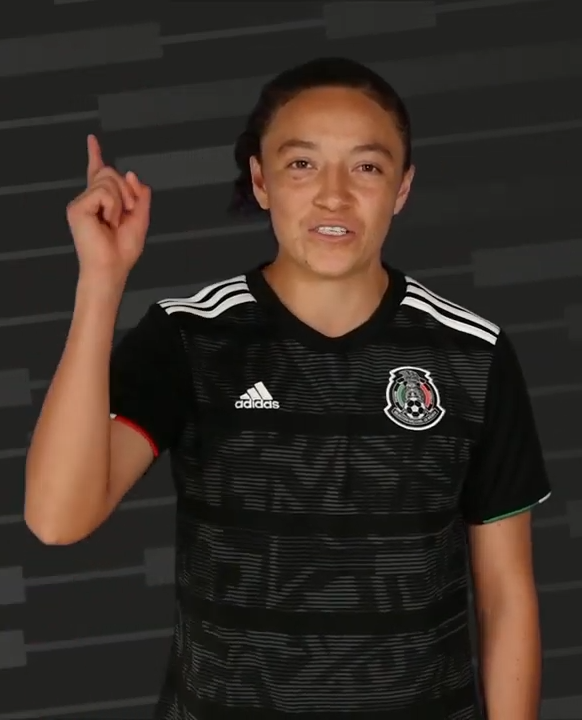
- Joana Robles in 2021

Personal information
- Full name: Joana Robles Partida
- Date of birth: 26 July 1994 (age 32)
- Place of birth: Tlajomulco de Zúñiga, Jalisco, Mexico
- Height: 1.54 m (5 ft 1 in)
- Position: Attacking midfielder

Senior career*
Years	Team	Apps	(Gls)
2018–2022	Atlas	94	(17)
2022–2025	Atlético San Luis	72	(7)
2025–2026	Querétaro	14	(0)

International career
2019–2021	Mexico	14	(0)
- * Club domestic league appearances and goals as of 5 February 2026

Joana Robles Partida (born 26 July 1994) is a Mexican footballer who plays as an attacking midfielder for the Mexico women's national team.

== International career ==
Robles made her senior debut for Mexico on 27 February 2019 in a friendly match against Italy.
