= Edith Carmona =

Mexican footballer (born 2003)

Personal information
- Full name: Edith Deyanira Carmona Castillo
- Date of birth: 20 January 2003 (age 23)
- Place of birth: Tlalnepantla de Baz, State of Mexico, Mexico
- Height: 1.56 m (5 ft 1 in)
- Position: Left back

Team information
- Current team: Querétaro
- Number: 22

Senior career*
Years	Team	Apps	(Gls)
2019–2025	Cruz Azul	104	(3)
2019–2021	→ Atlético San Luis (loan)	58	(1)
2025	UNAM	2	(0)
2026–	Querétaro	14	(2)

International career^{‡}
2020	Mexico U-17		
2021	Mexico U-20		
- * Club domestic league appearances and goals as of 4 June 2023 ‡ National team caps and goals as of 12 March 2022

Edith Deyanira Carmona Castillo (born 20 January 2003) is a Mexican professional footballer who plays as a Left back for Liga MX Femenil club Querétaro.

== Career ==
In 2019, she started her career in Cruz Azul. The next season, she was loaned to Atlético San Luis. In 2025, she was transferred to UNAM. Since 2026, she is part of Querétaro.
