= Stefani Jiménez =

Mexican footballer (born 1994)

Personal information
- Full name: Stefani Hetzabel Jiménez Plascencia
- Date of birth: 20 June 1994 (age 32)
- Place of birth: Colima City, Colima, Mexico
- Height: 1.70 m (5 ft 7 in)
- Position: Goalkeeper

Team information
- Current team: Toluca
- Number: 31

Senior career*
Years	Team	Apps	(Gls)
2019	UANL	0	(0)
2020	Juárez	13	(0)
2021–2022	Atlético San Luis	29	(0)
2022–2023	Juárez	25	(0)
2023–2024	Pachuca	0	(0)
2025	Tijuana	0	(0)
2025–2026	Pachuca	0	(0)
2026–	Toluca	0	(0)
- * Club domestic league appearances and goals as of 4 June 2023 ‡ National team caps and goals as of 12 March 2022

Stefani Hetzabel Jiménez Plascencia (born 1 June 1992) is a Mexican professional footballer who plays as a goalkeeper for Liga MX Femenil side Toluca.

== Career ==
In 2019, she started her career in UANL. In 2020, she was transferred to Juárez. In 2021, she joined to Atlético San Luis. In 2022, she returned to Juárez. Since 2023, she is part of Pachuca.

== Personal life ==
As of February 2024, Jiménez was in a relationship with C.F. Pachuca midfielder Javier Eduardo López.
