= Alejandra Martínez =

Mexican footballer (born 2002)

Personal information
- Full name: Alejandra Guadalupe Martínez Ríos
- Date of birth: 10 February 2002 (age 24)
- Place of birth: Durango City, Durango, Mexico
- Height: 1.60 m (5 ft 3 in)
- Position: Midfielder

Senior career*
Years	Team	Apps	(Gls)
2019–2022	Monterrey	30	(1)
2023–2024	Cruz Azul	43	(1)
2025–2026	Atlético San Luis	4	(0)
- * Club domestic league appearances and goals as of 4 June 2023

Alejandra Guadalupe Martínez Ríos (born 10 February 2002) is a Mexican professional footballer who plays as a Midfielder.

== Club career ==
In 2019, she started her career in Monterrey. In 2023, she signed with Cruz Azul. In 2025, she joined Atlético San Luis.
