= Barbrha Figueroa =

Mexican footballer (born 2001)

Personal information
- Full name: Barbrha Alejandra Figueroa González
- Date of birth: 13 September 2001 (age 25)
- Place of birth: Monterrey, Nuevo León, Mexico
- Height: 1.61 m (5 ft 3 in)
- Position: Left back

Senior career*
Years	Team	Apps	(Gls)
2020–2022	Puebla	49	(0)
2022–2026	Querétaro	104	(2)
- * Club domestic league appearances and goals as of 4 June 2023 ‡ National team caps and goals as of 12 March 2022

Barbrha Alejandra Figueroa González (born 13 September 2001) is a Mexican professional footballer who plays as a Left back for Liga MX Femenil club Querétaro.

== Career ==
In 2020, she started her career in Puebla. In 2022, she was transferred to Querétaro.
