= Karla Morales =

Mexican footballer (born 1997)

Personal information
- Full name: Karla Patricia Morales Ramírez
- Date of birth: 7 October 1997 (age 29)
- Place of birth: Guadalajara, Jalisco, Mexico
- Height: 1.68 m (5 ft 6 in)
- Position: Goalkeeper

Team information
- Current team: Querétaro
- Number: 12

Senior career*
| Years | Team | Apps | (Gls) |
| 2018–2019 | Puebla | 25 | (0) |
| 2019–2022 | Cruz Azul | 54 | (0) |
| 2022–2024 | Puebla | 61 | (3) |
| 2024–2026 | Juárez | 12 | (0) |
| 2026– | Querétaro | 0 | (0) |
- * Club domestic league appearances and goals as of 4 June 2023

Karla Patricia Morales Ramírez (born 24 May 1997) is a Mexican professional footballer who plays as a goalkeeper for Liga MX Femenil side Querétaro.

In 2018, she started her career in Puebla. In 2019, she was transferred to Cruz Azul. Since 2025, she is part of Juárez.
