= María Fernanda Pérez =

Mexican footballer (born 1995)

Personal information
- Full name: María Fernanda Daniela Pérez Limón
- Date of birth: 12 January 1995 (age 31)
- Place of birth: Guadalajara, Jalisco, Mexico
- Height: 1.72 m (5 ft 8 in)
- Position: Centre-back

Team information
- Current team: Querétaro
- Number: 3

Senior career*
Years	Team	Apps	(Gls)
2019–2025	Atlas	220	(21)
2025–	Querétaro	21	(1)

International career^{‡}
2011–2012	Mexico U17		
- * Club domestic league appearances and goals as of 5 February 2026 ‡ National team caps and goals as of 12 March 2022

María Fernanda Daniela Pérez Limón (born 12 January 1995), known as Fernanda Limón, is a Mexican professional footballer who plays as a Centre-back for Liga MX Femenil side Querétaro .

== Career ==
Since 2019, she is part of Atlas.

== International career ==
Pérez represented Mexico at the 2012 FIFA U-17 Women's World Cup.
