= Viridiana López =

Mexican footballer (born 2000)

Personal information
- Full name: Viridiana López Mata
- Date of birth: 1 February 2000 (age 26)
- Place of birth: Nezahualcóyotl, State of Mexico, Mexico
- Height: 1.62 m (5 ft 4 in)
- Position: Winger

Team information
- Current team: Atlético San Luis
- Number: 7

Senior career*
Years	Team	Apps	(Gls)
2019–2021	Toluca	48	(0)
2022–2024	Puebla	61	(2)
2024–	Atlético San Luis	48	(0)
- * Club domestic league appearances and goals as of 6 February 2026 ‡ National team caps and goals as of 12 March 2022

Viridiana López Mata (born 1 February 2000) is a Mexican professional footballer who plays as a Winger for Liga MX Femenil side Atlético San Luis.

== Club career ==
In 2019, she started her career in Toluca. In 2022, she signed with Puebla. In 2024, she joined Atlético San Luis.
