= Bianca Mora =

American soccer player (born 1996)

Personal information
- Full name: Bianca Mora de la Torre
- Date of birth: October 11, 1996 (age 30)
- Place of birth: San Diego, California, United States
- Height: 1.76 m (5 ft 9 in)
- Position: Center-back

Team information
- Current team: Juárez
- Number: 22

College career
Years	Team	Apps	(Gls)
2014	Cal State Dominguez Hills	8	(0)
2017	Southwestern (CA)	23	(22)

Senior career*
Years	Team	Apps	(Gls)
2019	ASC San Diego		
2019	San Diego Parceiro Ladies		
2022	Puebla	16	(2)
2023–2024	Tijuana	46	(6)
2025	Guadalajara	1	(0)
2025–	Juárez	0	(0)
- * Club domestic league appearances and goals as of 29 February 2024 ‡ National team caps and goals as of 29 February 2024

Bianca Mora de la Torre (born October 11, 1996) is an American professional soccer player who plays as a center-back for Liga MX Femenil side Juárez.

== Early life ==
Mora was born on October 11, 1996, in San Diego. She attended Hilltop High School in nearby Chula Vista, California, where she was a four-year starter on the soccer team. Mora was a three-time first-team all-league honoree and served as team captain as a senior.

Mora played one season of college soccer at Cal State Dominguez Hills in 2014, making eight appearances. She enrolled at Southwestern College in Chula Vista in 2017 and scored 22 goals in 23 games for the Jaguars that season.

== Career ==
In 2019, Mora played for ASC San Diego and San Diego Parceiro Ladies of the Women's Premier Soccer League (WPSL).

In 2022, she signed for Liga MX Femenil side Puebla. In 2023, she was transferred to Tijuana. In 2025, she signed with Guadalajara.
