= Christina Holguin =

American soccer player (born 1996)

Christina Holguín
Personal information
- Date of birth: 25 July 1996 (age 30)
- Place of birth: Los Angeles, California, United States
- Height: 1.77 m (5 ft 10 in)
- Position: Goalkeeper

Team information
- Current team: Juárez
- Number: 12

Youth career
- Alhambra Moors

College career
Years	Team	Apps	(Gls)
2014–2015	Rio Hondo Roadrunners	29	(0)
2016–2017	San Francisco State Gators	31	(0)

Senior career*
Years	Team	Apps	(Gls)
2017	FRAM Ajax	6	(0)
2018–2020	Puerto Rico Sol	29	(0)
2021–2022	Juárez	20	(0)
2023	Cruz Azul	1	(0)
2024	Pachuca	4	(0)
2025–	Juárez	0	(0)
- * Club domestic league appearances and goals

Christina Holguín (born 25 July 1996) is an American soccer player who plays as a goalkeeper for Liga MX Femenil club Juárez.

== Early life ==
Holguín was born in Los Angeles, California to Mexican parents. She was raised in nearby Alhambra.

== Amateur career ==
Holguín attended San Francisco State University and was the starting goalkeeper for the San Francisco State Gators soccer team. She was named once to the All-Conference First Team and twice to the All-Conference Second Team in the Division-II California Collegiate Athletic Association.

== Club career ==
Holguín signed with Puerto Rico Sol in July 2018.
