= Óscar Fernández (football manager, born 1987) =

Spanish football manager

Personal information
- Full name: Óscar Fernández Novillo
- Date of birth: 2 July 1987 (age 39)
- Place of birth: Villacañas, Spain
- Height: 1.70 m (5 ft 7 in)

Team information
- Current team: Juárez (women) (manager)

Managerial career
- Years: Team
- 2018: Unión Adarve
- 2019–2021: Madrid CFF
- 2021–2022: Atlético Madrid (women)
- 2023–: Juárez (women)

Óscar Fernández Novillo (born 2 July 1987) is a Spanish football manager who is the manager of Juárez (women) in the Liga MX Femenil since June 2023.

Between 2021 and 2022, Fernández worked as a coach at the Atlético Madrid.

== Career ==
In 2018, Fernández became the manager of Unión Adarve.

In 2019, Fernández was named the head coach of Madrid CFF .

Fernández was put in charge of the Atlético Madrid ahead of the 2021–22 season.

In 2023, Fernández was appointed as manager of Juárez (women) in the Liga MX Femenil.
