= Citlali Hernández =

Mexican footballer (born 1995)

Personal information
- Full name: Citlali Guadalupe Hernández Durán
- Date of birth: 31 October 1995 (age 30)
- Place of birth: Tepic, Nayarit, Mexico
- Height: 1.61 m (5 ft 3 in)
- Position: Defensive midfielder

Team information
- Current team: Atlético San Luis
- Number: 5

Senior career*
Years	Team	Apps	(Gls)
2018–2019	América	20	(0)
2020–	Atlético San Luis	156	(5)
2023	→ UNAM (loan)	26	(0)
- * Club domestic league appearances and goals as of 6 February 2026 ‡ National team caps and goals as of 12 March 2022

Citlali Guadalupe Hernández Durán (born 12 July 1999) is a Mexican professional footballer who plays as a Defensive midfielder for Liga MX Femenil side Atlético San Luis.

== Club career ==
In 2018, she started her career in América. In 2020, she was transferred to Atlético San Luis. In 2023, she signed with UNAM.
