= Ana Cristina González =

Mexican football manager

Personal information
- Full name: Ana Cristina González Zepeda
- Date of birth: 9 August 1981 (age 45)
- Place of birth: Guadalajara, Jalisco, Mexico
- Height: 1.70 m (5 ft 7 in)

Team information
- Current team: Ecuador (women) (assistant)

Senior career*
Years	Team	Apps	(Gls)
- UdeG (women)

Managerial career
- 2019–2020: Pachuca (women) (assistant)
- 2021–2022: Juárez (women)
- 2022–2025: UANL U-19 (women)
- 2026–: Ecuador (women) (assistant)
- * Club domestic league appearances and goals

Ana Cristina González Zepeda (born 9 August 1981) is a Mexican manager and former player who is the current manager for UANL U-19 (women) since 2022 until 2025.

== Career ==
González played collegiately at the Universidad de Guadalajara.

== Coaching career ==
González started her coaching career as assistant of Eva Espejo in Pachuca (women), from 2019 to 2020. In 2021, González signed as head coach of Juárez (women). In 2022, she was appointed as manager of UANL U-19 (women).
