= María José López (Mexican footballer) =

Mexican footballer (born 1993)

Personal information
- Full name: María José López López
- Date of birth: 6 July 1993 (age 33)
- Place of birth: Puebla City, Puebla, Mexico
- Height: 1.67 m (5 ft 6 in)
- Position: Defender

Team information
- Current team: Juárez (Assistant)

Senior career*
Years	Team	Apps	(Gls)
2018–2022	Puebla	117	(14)

Managerial career
- 2022–2023: Puebla U-18
- 2023–2024: Puebla
- 2024–2025: Guadalajara (Assistant)
- 2025–: Juárez (Assistant)
- * Club domestic league appearances and goals as of August 1, 2023 ‡ National team caps and goals as of August 1, 2023

María José López López (born 6 July 1993) is a former Mexican professional footballer who played as a defender for Liga MX Femenil club Puebla and she is currently the manager of Liga MX Femenil club Puebla.

== Club career ==
=== Puebla (2018–2022) ===
López made her professional debut with Puebla in 2018 at the age of 25. She scored her first goal on 11 August 2019 on a league match against Juárez.

== Managerial career ==
=== Puebla (2023–present) ===
In July 2023, López was appointed as the manager of Puebla. She became the first woman to lead the team.
