= Chiara Singarella =

Argentine footballer (born 2003

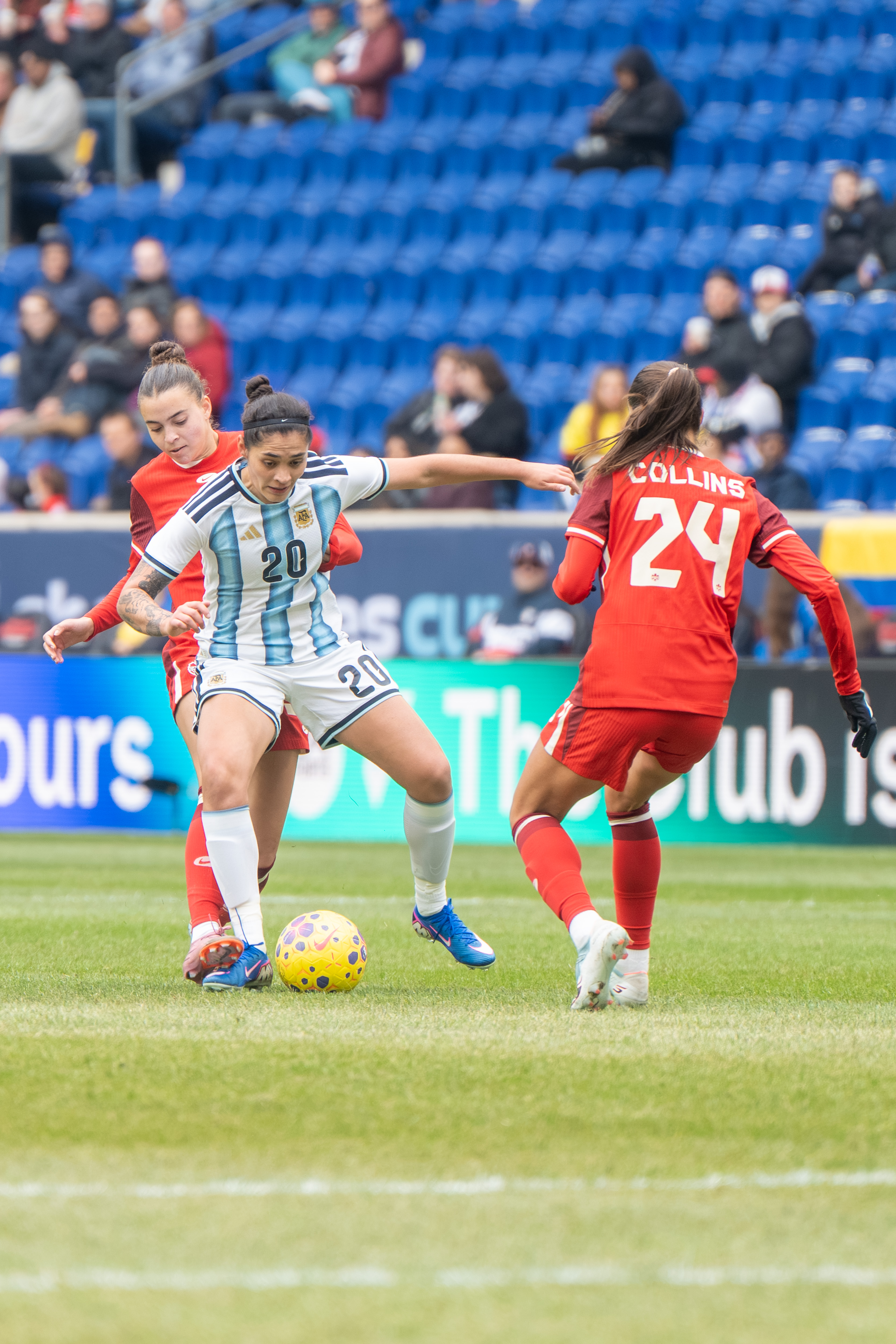

Personal information
- Full name: Chiara Pilar Singarella Sacaba
- Date of birth: 5 December 2003 (age 22)
- Place of birth: Luján de Cuyo, Argentina
- Height: 1.65 m (5 ft 5 in)
- Position: Forward

Team information
- Current team: Atlético San Luis
- Number: 30

College career
Years	Team	Apps	(Gls)
2022	Kennesaw State Owls	14	(1)
2023	South Alabama Jaguars	18	(9)
2024–2025	Purdue Boilermakers	16	(5)

Senior career*
Years	Team	Apps	(Gls)
2017–2021	Independiente Rivadavia		
2026–	Atlético San Luis	8	(1)

International career
2022	Argentina U20	4	(0)
2022–	Argentina	16	(1)
- * Club domestic league appearances and goals as of 5 May 2026

Chiara Pilar Singarella Sacaba (born 5 December 2003) is an Argentine footballer who plays as a forward for Liga MX Femenil side Atlético San Luis and the Argentina women's national team.

== Club career ==
In January 2026, it was announced that Singarella has signed with Atlético San Luis of the Liga MX Femenil.

== International career ==
She made her senior debut on February 20, 2022, on a 2–2 friendly against Colombia, match in which she also scored her first goal in the 89th minute.

== Career statistics ==
=== International ===
As of match played 7 March 2026

Appearances and goals by national team and year
National team	Year	Apps	Goals
Argentina	2022	2	1
Argentina	2023	4	0
Argentina	2024	6	0
Argentina	2025	2	0
Argentina	2026	2	0
Total		16	1
