= Karen Cano =

Mexican footballer (born 1994)

Personal information
- Full name: Karen Cano García
- Date of birth: 31 October 1994 (age 31)
- Place of birth: Tijuana, Baja California, Mexico
- Height: 1.66 m (5 ft 5 in)
- Position: Defender

Team information
- Current team: Atlético San Luis
- Number: 4

Senior career*
Years	Team	Apps	(Gls)
2022–	Atlético San Luis	92	(2)
- * Club domestic league appearances and goals as of 5 February 2026 ‡ National team caps and goals as of 12 March 2022

Karen Cano García (born 31 October 1994) is a Mexican professional footballer who plays as a Defender for Liga MX Femenil side Atlético San Luis.

== Club career ==
In 2022, she started her career in Atlético San Luis.
