= Dayán Fuentes =

Mexican footballer (born 1997)

Personal information
- Full name: Dayán Vianey Fuentes Pérez
- Date of birth: 24 May 1997 (age 29)
- Place of birth: Puebla City Puebla, Mexico
- Height: 1.68 m (5 ft 6 in)
- Position: Defensive midfielder

Team information
- Current team: Juárez
- Number: 20

Senior career*
Years	Team	Apps	(Gls)
2019	BUAP	12	(1)
2019	Veracruz	17	(0)
2020–2024	Necaxa	148	(3)
2025–	Juárez	9	(0)
- * Club domestic league appearances and goals as of 4 June 2023 ‡ National team caps and goals as of 12 March 2022

Dayán Vianey Fuentes Pérez (born 24 May 1997) is a Mexican professional footballer who plays as a Defensive midfielderfor Liga MX Femenil side Juárez.

In 2019, she started her career in BUAP. The same year, she was transferred to Veracruz. In 2020, she joined to Necaxa. Since 2025, she is part of Juárez.
