= Noemí Granados =

Mexican footballer (born 2002)

Personal information
- Full name: Noemí Granados Flores
- Date of birth: 30 September 2002 (age 24)
- Place of birth: Tijuana, Baja California, Mexico
- Height: 1.69 m (5 ft 7 in)
- Position: Midfielder

Team information
- Current team: Juárez
- Number: 3

Senior career*
Years	Team	Apps	(Gls)
2018–2019	Veracruz	35	(1)
2019–2023	Toluca	105	(3)
2023–2025	América	28	(1)
2025–	Juárez	0	(0)

International career^{‡}
2017–2018	Mexico U17		
2019–2020	Mexico U20		
- * Club domestic league appearances and goals as of 3 January 2025 ‡ National team caps and goals as of 23 February 2021

Noemí Granados Flores (born 30 September 2002) is a Mexican footballer who plays as a midfielder for Liga MX Femenil side FC Juárez.

== Club career ==
In 2018, she started her career in Veracruz. In 2019, she was transferred to Toluca. In 2023, she joined to América.

== International career ==
Granados was member of the squad that played the Mexico women's national under-17 football team at the 2018 FIFA U-17 Women's World Cup.
