= Fátima Rosales =

Mexican footballer (born 1997)

Personal information
- Full name: Fátima Rosales Miranda
- Date of birth: 28 November 1997 (age 28)
- Place of birth: Morelia, Michoacán, Mexico
- Height: 1.69 m (5 ft 7 in)
- Position: Winger

Team information
- Current team: Querétaro
- Number: 4

Senior career*
Years	Team	Apps	(Gls)
2022–2024	Puebla	53	(4)
2024–2025	Toluca	0	(0)
2026	Puebla	4	(0)
2026–	Querétaro	0	(0)
- * Club domestic league appearances and goals as of 4 June 2023

Fátima Rosales Miranda (born 28 November 1997) is a Mexican professional footballer who plays as a Winger for Liga MX Femenil side Querétaro F.C..

== Club career ==
In 2022, she started her career in Puebla. In 2024, she was transferred to Toluca.
