= Isabel Kasis =

Mexican footballer (born 2001)

Personal information
- Full name: Isabel Kasis Monjarás
- Date of birth: 16 August 2001 (age 25)
- Place of birth: San Luis Potosí City, San Luis Potosí, Mexico
- Height: 1.60 m (5 ft 3 in)
- Position: Winger

Senior career*
Years	Team	Apps	(Gls)
2019–2026	Atlético San Luis	143	(14)
2022–2023	→ Guadalajara (loan)	14	(1)
- * Club domestic league appearances and goals as of 6 February 2026

Isabel Kasis Monjarás (born 16 August 2001) is a Mexican professional footballer who plays as a Winger.

== Club career ==
In 2019, she started her career in Atlético San Luis. In 2023, she signed on loan with Guadalajara.
