= Natalia Macías Valadez =

Mexican footballer (born 2003)

Personal information
- Full name: Natalia Macías Valadez Aguilera
- Date of birth: 30 July 2003 (age 23)
- Place of birth: Mexico City, Mexico
- Height: 1.53 m (5 ft 0 in)
- Position: Winger

Team information
- Current team: Atlético San Luis
- Number: 19

Senior career*
Years	Team	Apps	(Gls)
2019–2023	UNAM	71	(5)
2023–2026	Toluca	72	(6)
2026–	Atlético San Luis	0	(0)
- * Club domestic league appearances and goals as of 4 June 2023

Natalia Macías Valadez Aguilera (born 30 July 2003) is a Mexican professional footballer who plays as a winger.

== Career ==
In 2019, she started her career in UNAM. In 2023, she was transferred to Toluca.
