= Rigoberto Esparza =

Mexican football manager (born 1983)

Personal information
- Full name: Rigoberto Esparza Morales
- Date of birth: 16 November 1983 (age 42)
- Place of birth: Guadalajara, Mexico
- Height: 1.80 m (5 ft 11 in)
- Position: Midfielder

Team information
- Current team: Necaxa U-21 (Manager)

Senior career*
Years	Team	Apps	(Gls)
2003–2008	Atlético Mexiquense	105	(2)
2006	Toluca	1	(0)
2009–2010	Durango	33	(2)

Managerial career
- 2017–2018: CAFESSA (Liga TDP) (Assistant)
- 2018: CAFESSA Jalisco (Assistant)
- 2019: CAFESSA (Liga TDP)
- 2019–2020: Atlético San Luis Reserves and Academy
- 2020–2021: Atlético San Luis Femenil
- 2021–2023: Atlético San Luis Reserves and Academy
- 2023–2024: Venados (Assistant)
- 2024–2025: Venados
- 2026–: Necaxa Reserves and Academy
- * Club domestic league appearances and goals

Rigoberto Esparza Morales (born 16 November 1983) is a Mexican football manager, who was the manager of the Liga MX Femenil club Atlético de San Luis Femenil. He is a former professional footballer, who played as a midfielder.

== Playing career ==
Esparza began his career with Toluca and their farm team Atlético Mexiquense. He made his professional debut with Durango in a 5–1 Ascenso MX win over Académicos on 12 January 2009.

== Managerial career ==
Esparza was signed as the manager for Atlético de San Luis Femenil on 12 June 2020. He remained in the position until 2021 when he was moved to the team's youth department.

In 2023, he was hired as managerial assistant to Rafael Fernández, who was elected as coach of Venados F.C., a team in the Liga de Expansión MX. In May 2024, Esparza was promoted to the main position after Fernández's departure. Esparza remained in office until August 2025 when he was sacked following a series of poor team results.
