= Nathaly Martínez =

Mexican footballer (born 2002)

Personal information
- Full name: Nathaly Sofía Martínez Caro
- Date of birth: 2 February 2002 (age 24)
- Place of birth: Tijuana, Baja California, Mexico
- Height: 1.61 m (5 ft 3 in)
- Position: Centre back

Team information
- Current team: Querétaro
- Number: 2

Senior career*
Years	Team	Apps	(Gls)
2019–2025	Tijuana	110	(1)
2026–	Querétaro	7	(0)

International career^{‡}
2021	Mexico U-20		
- * Club domestic league appearances and goals as of 4 June 2023 ‡ National team caps and goals as of 12 March 2022

Nathaly Sofía Martínez Caro (born 2 February 2002) is a Mexican professional footballer who plays as a Centre back for Liga MX Femenil club Querétaro.

== Career ==
In 2020, she started her career in Tijuana. In 2022, she was transferred to Querétaro.
