= Amalia López =

Mexican soccer player (born 2005)

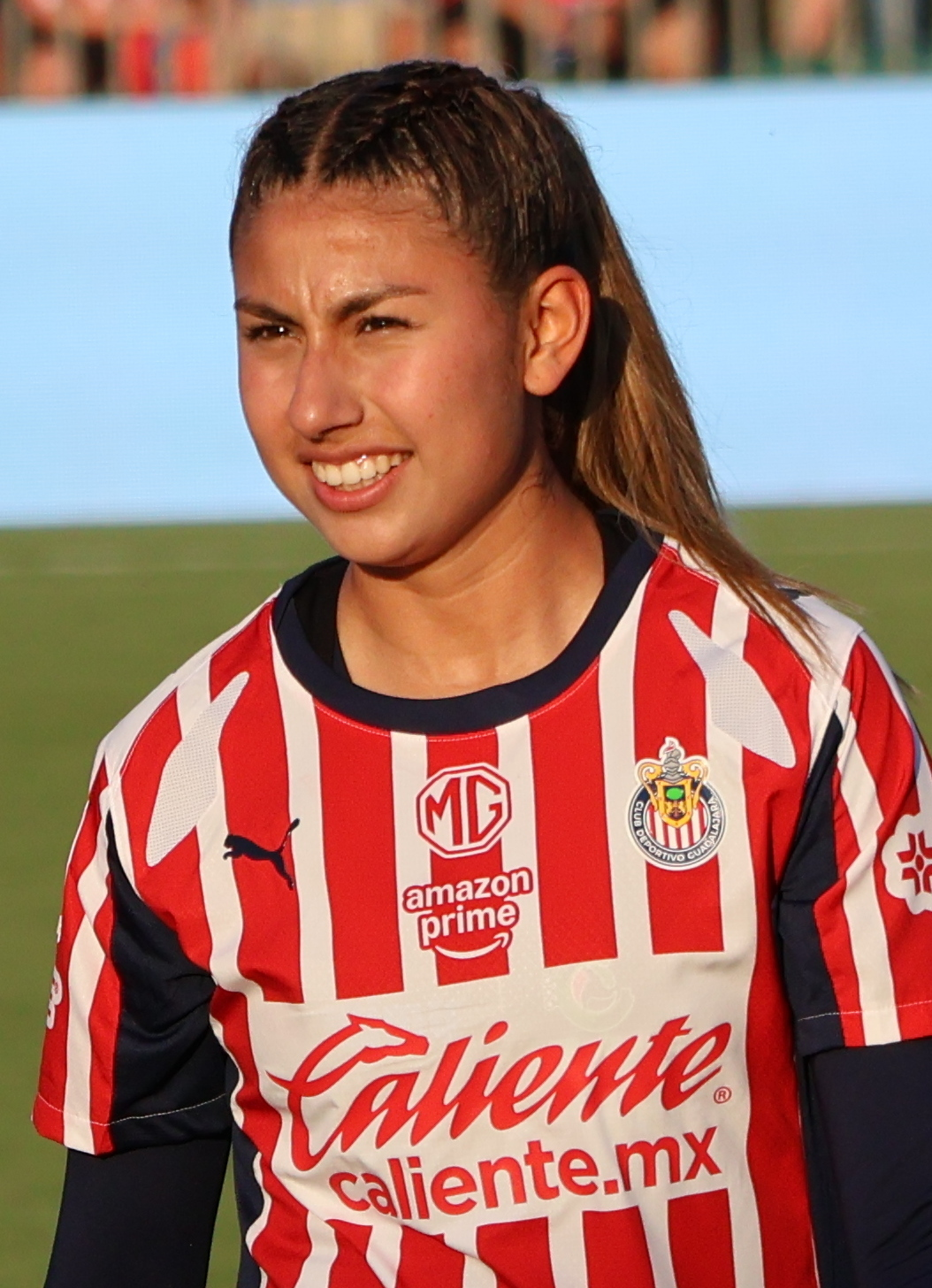
- López with Guadalajara in 2025

Personal information
- Full name: Amalia Phoebe López Rodríguez
- Date of birth: December 6, 2005 (age 20)
- Place of birth: Dallas, Texas, United States
- Height: 1.63 m (5 ft 4 in)
- Position: Attacking midfielder

Team information
- Current team: Querétaro (on loan from Guadalajara)
- Number: 5

Youth career
- Alianza de Futbol
- Dallas Texans

Senior career*
Years	Team	Apps	(Gls)
2024–	Guadalajara	17	(2)
2026–	→ Querétaro (loan)	0	(0)
- * Club domestic league appearances and goals as of May 4, 2026

Amalia Phoebe López Rodríguez (born December 6, 2005) is a professional soccer player who plays as a midfielder for Liga MX Femenil club Querétaro, on loan from Guadalajara. Born in the United States, she has been called up to the Mexico and United States youth national teams.

== Early life ==
Born in Dallas, Texas, to Mexican parents, López began playing indoor soccer and futsal at an early age. She joined local club Alianza de Futbol before moving to the Dallas Texans, where she earned ECNL all-conference honors twice. She played high school soccer at North Mesquite High School and was named the District 12-5A MVP after her junior and senior seasons. She scored 39 goals with 13 assists as a junior in 2023, accounting for over half the team's offense. She scored 52 goals with 13 assists as a senior in 2024, leading the team to its first district title in 20 years. She was committed to play college soccer for the Colorado State Rams before deciding to turn professional with Guadalajara.

== Club career ==
López trained with multiple Liga MX Femenil clubs, including Pachuca, before she joined Guadalajara in the summer before the 2024 Apertura. On September 2, 2024, she made her first-team debut for Chivas, playing six minutes in a 2–0 loss to Toluca. The following week, she scored her first professional goal to spark a 3–1 comeback win over Necaxa. However, she played primarily for the club's under-19 side during the 2024 Apertura, scoring 5 goals in 11 games and helping the team to the quarterfinals.

López was promoted to the first team on a permanent basis before the 2025 Clausura, starting the season with a goal in a 3–0 win over Nexaca on January 6, 2025.

Before the 2026 Apertura, López was sent on loan to fellow league club Querétaro.

== International career ==
López was called up to the Mexico under-17 team in 2022 and the under-20 team in 2023. In June 2025, she was called up to the United States under-20 team but was unable to attend the camp due to preseason with Guadalajara.
