= Anjulí Ladrón =

Mexican footballer (born 1986)

Personal information
- Full name: Anjulí Mariana Ladrón de Guevara Guereña
- Date of birth: October 7, 1986 (age 40)
- Place of birth: Puerto Vallarta, Jalisco, Mexico
- Height: 1.68 m (5 ft 6 in)
- Position: Goalkeeper

Senior career*
Years	Team	Apps	(Gls)
- Atlas
- Club Magic Marin County
2006	Guadalajara		
- Naftokhimik Kalush
- Santa Clarita Blue Heat
- Puebla
2012	Zorky Krasnogorsk		
- CD San Isidro
2017	Tijuana	0	(0)
2019	UANL	0	(0)

International career
2005–2006	Mexico U20		
2006	Mexico		
- * Club domestic league appearances and goals as of 18 October 2017

Anjulí Mariana Ladrón de Guevara Guereña (born 7 October 1986) is a Mexican former professional football goalkeeper who last played for Tigres UANL of the Liga MX Femenil.

She played for the Mexico U20 at the 2006 FIFA U-20 Women's World Championship.

== Other sports ==
In 2017 Ladrón de Guevara took up cricket and played for the Mexico women's national cricket team at the 2019 Central American Cricket Championship at the Reforma Athletic Club, Mexico City; Ladrón de Guevara received a trophy as the T20I tournament's best player. She has represented her country internationally in five disciplines: soccer (both in its traditional version and in seven-on-seven), American football, a precision sport called footgolf (a combo of golf and soccer) and cricket.
