= Vanessa Flores =

Mexican footballer (born 1997)

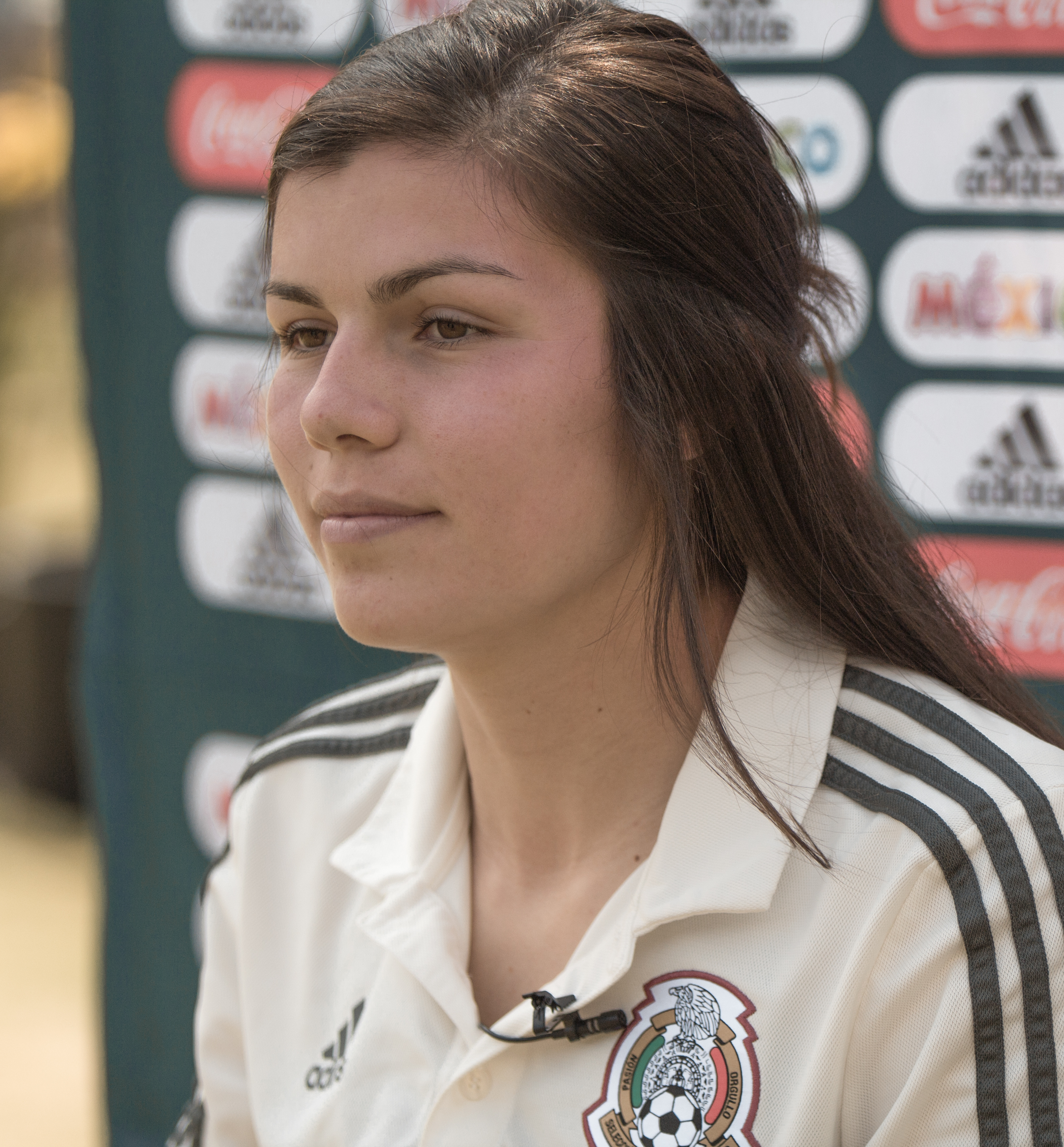
- Flores in 2016

Personal information
- Full name: Vanessa Flores Bear
- Date of birth: 26 May 1997 (age 29)
- Place of birth: Houston, Texas, United States
- Height: 1.69 m (5 ft 7 in)
- Position: Centre back

College career
Years	Team	Apps	(Gls)
2015–2018	West Virginia Mountaineers	69	(1)

Senior career*
Years	Team	Apps	(Gls)
2019–2020	UANL	7	(0)

International career^{‡}
2013–2014	Mexico U-17	9	(1)
2015–2016	Mexico U-20	8	(0)
2017–	Mexico	1	(0)
- * Club domestic league appearances and goals as of 22 August 2019 ‡ National team caps and goals as of 4 February 2017

Vanessa Flores Bear (born 26 May 1997) is an American-born Mexican footballer who played as centre back for Tigres UANL and the Mexico women's national team.

She was the first foreign-born Mexican player who signed with a Liga MX Femenil club.

== International career ==
Flores represented Mexico at the 2013 CONCACAF Women's U-17 Championship, the 2014 FIFA U-17 Women's World Cup, the 2015 CONCACAF Women's U-20 Championship and the 2016 FIFA U-20 Women's World Cup. She made her senior debut on 4 February 2017 in a friendly match against Canada.

== Honors and awards ==
=== International ===
Mexico U17

- CONCACAF Women's U-17 Championship: 2013

== See also ==
- List of Mexico women's international footballers
