= Sonia Vázquez =

Mexican footballer (born 1996)

Personal information
- Full name: Sonia Vázquez Montiel
- Date of birth: 28 July 1996 (age 30)
- Place of birth: Guanajuato City, Guanajuato, Mexico
- Height: 1.72 m (5 ft 8 in)
- Position: Defensive midfielder

Team information
- Current team: Toluca
- Number: 6

Senior career*
| Years | Team | Apps | (Gls) |
| 2018–2020 | UANL | 12 | (0) |
| 2020–2021 | León | 47 | (5) |
| 2022–2023 | Querétaro | 34 | (5) |
| 2024– | Toluca | 60 | (1) |
- * Club domestic league appearances and goals as of 31 January 2026 ‡ National team caps and goals as of 12 March 2022

Sonia Vázquez Montiel (born 28 July 1996) is a Mexican professional footballer who plays as an attacking midfielder for Liga MX Femenil side Toluca.

== Career ==
In 2018, she started her career in UANL. In 2020, she was transferred to León. In 2022, she joined Querétaro. In 2024, she signed with Toluca.
