= Natalia Gómez Junco =

Mexican footballer (born 1992)

Personal information
- Full name: Natalia Inés Gómez Junco Esteva
- Date of birth: 9 October 1992 (age 34)
- Place of birth: Mexico City, Mexico
- Height: 1.60 m (5 ft 3 in)
- Position: Attacking midfielder

College career
Years	Team	Apps	(Gls)
2011–2012	Memphis Tigers	38	(10)
2013–2015	LSU Tigers	43	(9)

Senior career*
Years	Team	Apps	(Gls)
2016–2017	Þór/KA	32	(5)
2018	Hamrarnir	2	(1)
2018	Málaga	11	(1)
2019–2021	UANL	36	(5)
2021–2022	Pachuca	23	(6)
2022–2023	Atlético San Luis	30	(1)
2023–2024	Toluca	47	(3)

International career
2010–2012	Mexico U-20	16	(6)
2013–2018	Mexico	5	(0)

Managerial career
- 2018: Hamrarnir (Women)
- * Club domestic league appearances and goals as of 6 December 2018

Natalia Inés Gómez Junco Esteva (born 9 October 1992) is a former Mexican professional footballer who last played as a midfielder for Liga MX Femenil side Toluca and the Mexico women's national team.
