= Annia Mejía =

Mexican footballer (born 1996)

Personal information
- Full name: Annia Stephany Mejía Alcaraz
- Date of birth: 12 March 1996 (age 30)
- Place of birth: Bloomington, California, U.S.
- Height: 1.73 m (5 ft 8 in)
- Position: Centre-back

College career
Years	Team	Apps	(Gls)
2014–2016	California Golden Bears	57	(2)

Senior career*
Years	Team	Apps	(Gls)
2018–2019	Fundación Albacete	0	(0)
2019	→ Sporting Gijón (loan)	9	(0)
2019–2021	Monterrey	50	(5)
2021–2022	Tijuana	36	(1)
2022–2023	Pachuca	33	(0)
2023–2025	Juárez	64	(7)
2025–2026	América	15	(0)

International career^{‡}
2015	United States U-20		
2015–2016	Mexico U-20	8	(0)
2016–	Mexico	9	(0)
- * Club domestic league appearances and goals as of 24 May 2026 ‡ National team caps and goals as of 12 September 2025

Annia Stephany Mejía Alcaraz (born 12 March 1996) is a professional footballer who plays as a centre-back. Born in the United States, she plays for the Mexico national team.

== International career ==
Mejía's father attempted her to represent his homeland Honduras, but contacts with the local federation and one of its women's national team players were unsuccessful.

Mejía represented her mother's homeland Mexico at the 2015 CONCACAF Women's U-20 Championship and the 2016 FIFA U-20 Women's World Cup. She made her senior debut on 26 January 2016.

== Honours ==
- Liga MX Femenil: Clausura 2026
- CONCACAF W Champions Cup: 2025–26
- Liga MX Femenil: Campeón de Campeonas 2025–26
