= Frankie Oviedo =

Colombian footballer and coach (born 1973)

Personal information
- Full name: Frankie Oviedo Oviedo
- Date of birth: 21 September 1973 (age 53)
- Place of birth: Cali, Colombia
- Height: 1.89 m (6 ft 2 in)
- Position: Midfielder

Senior career*
Years	Team	Apps	(Gls)
1993–1994	América de Cali	31	(0)
1995	Deportes Quindío	25	(0)
1996	América de Cali	69	(7)
1997	Deportes Quindío	0	(0)
1998–2000	América de Cali	84	(10)
2000–2004	Club América	114	(20)
2004–2005	Puebla FC	33	(2)
2005–2006	Pachuca CF	15	(1)
2006–2007	Club Necaxa	14	(0)
2007–2008	Deportivo Táchira	11	(1)
2008	Boyacá Chico	19	(1)

International career
1999–2005	Colombia	24	(4)

Managerial career
- 2012–2014: Tijuana Reserves and Academy
- 2014: Dorados de Sinaloa (Assistant)
- 2017–2020: Tijuana Reserves and Academy
- 2018: Tijuana (Interim)
- 2020–2021: Tijuana (Women)
- * Club domestic league appearances and goals

Frankie Oviedo (born September 21, 1973) is a Colombian former footballer and coach who played for various clubs of Colombia, Venezuela and Mexico as a midfielder. He retired in 2009 to lead a youth football academy in Cali. He capped 20 matches with the national team.

In 2012, he joined Club Tijuana in Mexico as an assistant coach for the U-20 teams. He currently leads the Tijuana Femenil.

== Titles ==
Season	Club	Title
1996-97	América de Cali	Copa Mustang
2002	Club América	Primera División de México - Verano
2007	Club Necaxa	InterLiga
2008	Boyacá Chico	Copa Mustang I

== Personal life ==
Oviedo's daughter, Valentina Oviedo, who was born in Mexico City, plays for Tijuana in the Liga MX Femenil and is a member of the Colombia women's national under-20 football team.
