= Bianca Sierra =

Mexican footballer (born 1992)

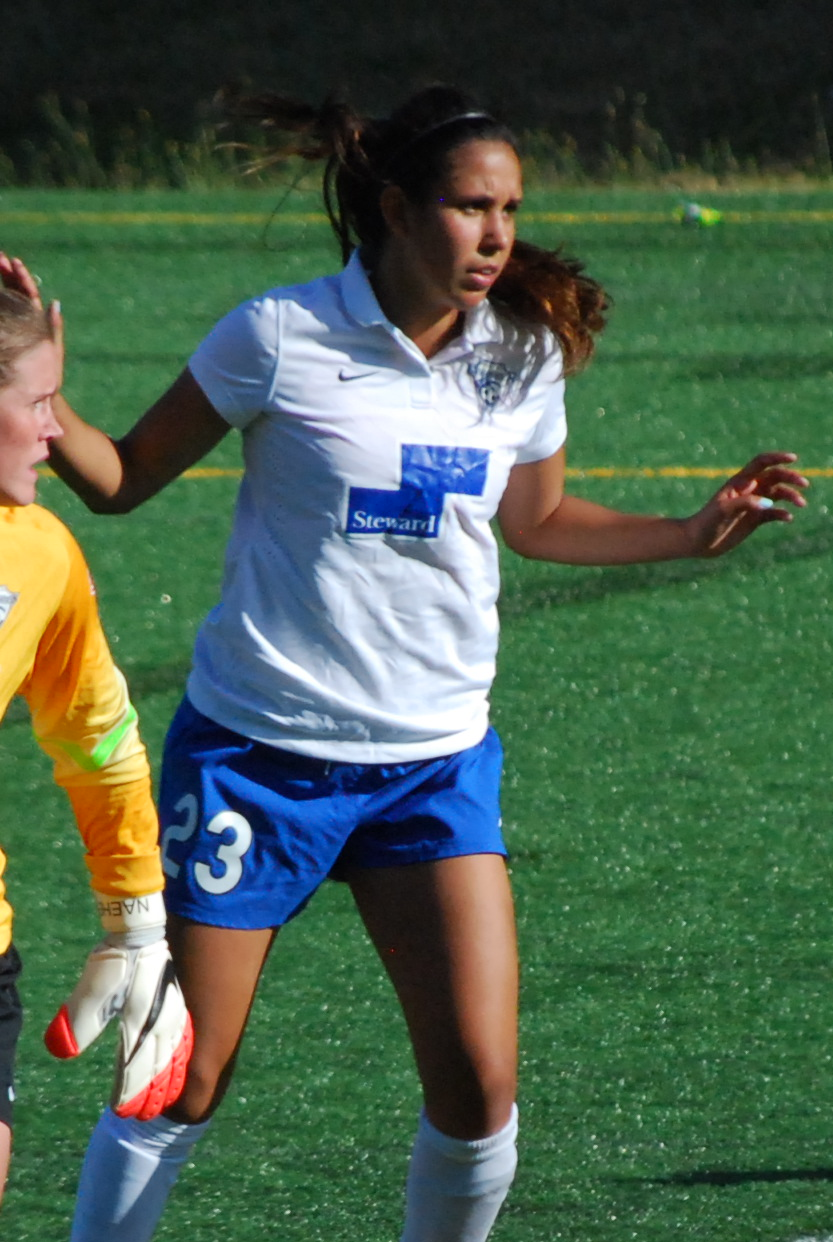
- Sierra with Boston Breakers in 2014

Personal information
- Full name: Bianca Elissa Sierra García
- Date of birth: 25 June 1992 (age 34)
- Place of birth: Mountain View, California, U.S.
- Height: 1.70 m (5 ft 7 in)
- Position: Right-back

College career
Years	Team	Apps	(Gls)
2010–2013	Auburn Tigers	85	(5)

Senior career*
Years	Team	Apps	(Gls)
2014	Washington Spirit	9	(0)
2014–2015	Boston Breakers	11	(0)
2016	Arna-Bjørnar	21	(0)
2017–2019	Þór/KA	31	(2)
2020–2025	UANL	57	(1)

International career^{‡}
2009–2012	Mexico U20	8	(0)
2013–2022	Mexico	76	(0)
- * Club domestic league appearances and goals as of 4 March 2018 ‡ National team caps and goals as of 2 September 2022

Bianca Elissa Sierra García (born 25 June 1992) is a former professional footballer who last played as a centre-back for Liga MX Femenil club UANL. Born in the United States, she represented Mexico at international level.

== Early life ==
Bianca Sierra is the daughter of Alberto Sierra and Rosa García. They manage several Mexican restaurants in the San Francisco Bay Area. Sierra played forward, midfield, and centerback in high school from her freshman through junior years and with the Mustang Spirit, a girl's club team, in 2009.

== College ==
Sierra played with the Auburn Tigers of the Auburn University from 2010 to 2013 and was a starting center back for the last three of her four years on the Auburn Tigers women's soccer team. She played in a total of 85 matches and scored five goals and seven assists.

== Professional career ==
=== National Women's Soccer League ===
Sierra was not among the 36 college soccer players drafted by the NWSL in January 2014. She showed up at tryouts for the Washington Spirit, played in several pre-season games, and was signed to a contract for the 2014 season on 4 April 2014. On 18 June 2014, the Washington Spirit traded Sierra to the Boston Breakers in exchange for forward and Australian international Lisa De Vanna and an international roster spot until the end of the 2014 NWSL season.

=== Toppserien ===
Sierra joined the first division Norwegian club Arna-Bjørnar in March 2016.

=== Úrvalsdeild ===
Sierra signed for Icelandic Úrvalsdeild kvenna team Þór/KA in March 2017. She played 18 games during the 2017 Úrvalsdeild kvenna season, scoring two goals and helping the club to the national championship. In November 2017, Sierra signed with Þór/KA again for the 2018 season.

== Mexico women's national soccer team ==
Sierra was a member of the Under-20 Mexico women's national football team from 2009 to 2012. She played in all eight matches for Mexico in the 2010 FIFA U-20 Women's World Cup in Germany and the 2012 FIFA U-20 Women's World Cup in Japan. Her teams advanced to the quarterfinals in both events.

In 2013 Sierra was selected to be a member of the Mexico women's national football team and played in friendly matches against Canada and the United States. In 2014, she was on the roster of the Mexico team at the Four Nations Tournament in China.

== Personal life ==
In June 2016, Sierra announced publicly she was in a relationship with fellow Mexico women's national teammate Stephany Mayor. Sierra and Mayor are believed to be the first openly gay athletes in Mexico history. In 2015, Mexican coach, Leonardo Cuellar, had warned Sierra and Mayor to avoid any "stunts" or "holding hands." In 2016, Mayor was not selected by Cuellar to play for the Mexico national team and Sierra declined to play on the national team. Mayor departed Mexico to play in Iceland. Sierra later joined her in Iceland.

Mayor rejoined the Mexico national team, under new coach Roberto Medina, for a match against Venezuela on 10 June 2017. Sierra rejoined the national team shortly thereafter.
