= Cinthya Peraza =

Mexican football player (born 1993)

- Peraza in 2019

Personal information
- Full name: Cinthya Peraza Fernández
- Date of birth: 5 June 1993 (age 33)
- Place of birth: Mazatlán, Sinaloa, Mexico
- Height: 1.51 m (4 ft 11 in)
- Position: Attacking midfielder

Team information
- Current team: Juárez
- Number: 17

Senior career*
Years	Team	Apps	(Gls)
2018–2023	Santos Laguna	106	(33)
2023–2026	Toluca	97	(19)
2026–	Juárez	8	(1)

International career^{‡}
2021–	Mexico	1	(19)
- * Club domestic league appearances and goals as of 30 October 2026 ‡ National team caps and goals as of 23 October 2021

Cinthya Peraza Fernández (born 5 June 1993) is a Mexican footballer who plays for Juárez in Liga MX Femenil.

== Early career ==
In 2017, Peraza represented Mexico at the 2017 Homeless World Cup in Oslo, scoring 15 goals as Mexico won the women's tournament.

== Club career ==
=== Santos Laguna ===
In December 2018, Peraza signed with Liga MX Femenil side Santos Laguna.

== International career ==
On 23 October 2021, Peraza made her debut for the Mexico national team in a 6–1 victory over Argentina at Estadio Gregorio "Tepa" Gómez.
