= Roberto Medina =

Mexican footballer and manager (born 1968)

Personal information
- Full name: Roberto Gerardo Medina Arellano
- Date of birth: 18 April 1968 (age 58)
- Place of birth: Mexico City, Mexico
- Height: 1.74 m (5 ft 9 in)
- Position: Midfielder

Team information
- Current team: UNAM (women) (Manager)

Senior career*
Years	Team	Apps	(Gls)
1988–1992	UNAM	99	(3)
1993–1994	UAG	29	(1)
1994–1997	Monterrey	103	(8)
1997–1999	León	32	(2)
1999–2000	Puebla	31	(1)
2000–2001	Atlante	17	(1)
2001	Irapuato	15	(0)
2002	Tiburones Rojos de Veracruz	15	(1)
2002	Atlante	2	(0)
2003	Zacatepec	1	(0)

International career
1993–1998	Mexico	7	(0)

Managerial career
- 2010: Mexico U-20 (women)
- 2016: Mexico U-20 (women)
- 2016: Mexico (women) (Interim)
- 2016–2018: Mexico (women)
- 2019–2022: UANL (women)
- 2023–2025: Atlas (women)
- 2026–: UNAM (women)
- * Club domestic league appearances and goals

Roberto Gerardo Medina Arellano (born 18 April 1968) is a Mexican football manager and former player and current manager. He was the head coach of the Mexico women's national football team.

== Club career ==
Medina began his professional career in 1988 with UNAM Pumas, with whom he won the 1989 CONCACAF Champions Cup and the 1991 Mexican Championship.

In 1992, he moved to CF Pachuca, for whom he scored a total of seven goals in the 1992/93 season, more than in any other season. On 18 October 1992, he scored twice in a 3–2 win over Deportivo Toluca and on 21 November 1992, he scored one in a 5-0 thrashing of Club América, arch-rivals of his previous employers, Pumas. The other four goals came in just five weeks between 6 February 1993 (1-2 at CD Veracruz) and 14 March 1993 (2-1 against Atlas).

Via UAG Tecos, where he was under contract in the 1993/94 season and was part of the team that won the only league title in the history of Tecos, he came to CF Monterrey in 1994, for which he made the most top division appearances with 103 appearances, completing his career. Then he was from 1997 to 1999 at Club León, in the 1999/00 season at Puebla FC, and most recently at Club Atlante under contract, where he was used less frequently at the Potros and for a half-season at CD Irapuato and CD Veracruz was borrowed. In 2003, he ended his active career with CD Zacatepec, which plays in the second-class Primera División 'A'.

== International career ==
Medina made his debut for the Mexico national team on 22 September 1993, in a friendly against Cameroon, which they won 1–0. Medina played the last four of his six international appearances in February 1998 as part of the 1998 CONCACAF Gold Cup in the USA. His last game was the 1–0 final win over the hosts and Mexico's arch-rivals USA on 15 February 1998.

== Manager ==
After retiring, Medina began coaching and was responsible for the Mexico U-20 women's national soccer team, which he led to the quarter-finals of the 2010 and 2012 World Cups. He was later appointed manager of the Mexican Women's National Team.

He was the head coach of Tigres UANL Femenil from 2019 to 2022, winning two Liga MX Femenil titles.

== Honours ==
UNAM

- Mexican Primera División: 1990–91
- CONCACAF Champions' Cup: 1989

UAG

- Mexican Primera División: 1993–94

Mexico

- CONCACAF Gold Cup: 1998
