= FC Juárez (women) =

Mexican professional women's football club

Juárez Femenil
- Full name: Fútbol Club Juárez Femenil
- Nickname: Las Bravas (The Wild Ones)
- Founded: 11 June 2019; 7 years ago
- Ground: Estadio Olímpico Benito Juárez; Ciudad Juárez, Chihuahua
- Capacity: 19,703
- Owner: MountainStar Sports Group
- Chairman: Vacant
- Manager: Óscar Fernández
- League: Liga Femenil
- Clausura 2026: Regular phase: 8th Final phase: Quarter-finals
- Website: www.fcjuarez.com
Home colours	Away colours

FC Juárez Femenil is a Mexican professional women's football club based in Ciudad Juárez, Chihuahua. It competes in the Liga Femenil, and has been the women's section of FC Juárez since 2019.

The team was founded on June 11, 2019, ahead of the 2019–20 Liga MX Femenil season, after Juárez, which was then playing in the Liga de Expansión (second-division) bought the Lobos BUAP’s Liga MX franchise and relocated it to Ciudad Juárez, therefore allowing the club to be promoted to the Liga MX. After making the purchase, FC Juárez had to assume all of BUAP's Liga MX responsibilities, including the obligation to field a respective women's team in Liga MX Femenil. In July 2019, FC Juárez Femenil played its first league game.

== Personnel ==
=== Club administration ===
Position	Staff
Sporting Chairman	Vacant
Corporate Chairman	(United States) Luis Rodríguez
Sporting Director	(Mexico) Jesús Mesta

=== Coaching staff ===
Position	Staff
Manager	(Spain) Óscar Fernández
Assistant managers	(Mexico) Yarla Rangel
Assistant managers	(Mexico) José Chacón
Assistant managers	(Mexico) María José López
Fitness coaches	(Mexico) Cheyli Almejo
Team doctor	(Mexico) Alejandra Domínguez
Team doctor assistants	(Mexico) Ana Constantino
Team doctor assistants	(Mexico) José Diaz

== Players ==
=== Current squad ===
As of 31 July 2026

Note: Flags indicate national team as defined under FIFA eligibility rules; some limited exceptions apply. Players may hold more than one non-FIFA nationality.

No.	Pos.	Nation	Player
3	DF	MEX	Noemí Granados
4	MF	MEX	Miriam Castillo
5	DF	COL	Yunaira López
6	MF	MEX	Amanda Pérez
7	MF	MEX	Norma Palafox
8	MF	MEX	Liliana Mercado
9	FW	CRC	Melissa Herrera
10	MF	MEX	Miah Zuazua
11	MF	USA	Dayana Martin
12	GK	USA	Christina Holguin
13	FW	GUA	Aisha Solórzano
14	DF	MEX	Mónica Rodríguez
15	MF	MEX	Chloe del Real
16	DF	MEX	Giselle Espinoza

No.	Pos.	Nation	Player
17	MF	MEX	Cinthya Peraza
18	MF	FRA	Aurélie Kaci
19	MF	COL	Farlyn Caicedo
20	DF	MEX	Karime Abud
21	DF	MEX	Mariana Cadena
22	DF	USA	Bianca Mora
23	FW	MEX	Blanca Solís
24	DF	ESP	Rocío Gálvez
25	DF	MEX	Gabriela Anchondo
26	DF	MEX	Johana García
28	GK	MEX	Emily Alvarado
29	FW	USA	Alondra Blanco
30	MF	MEX	Dayán Fuentes
35	GK	MEX	Alexa Gurrola
