= Querétaro F.C. (women) =

Mexican football club

Querétaro Femenil
- Full name: Querétaro Fútbol Club Femenil
- Nicknames: Las Gallinas Blancas (The White Hens); Las Albiazules (The White-and-Blues)
- Founded: 2016; 10 years ago
- Ground: Estadio Corregidora; Querétaro, Querétaro
- Capacity: 34,107
- Owner: Innovatio Capital
- Chairman: Marc Spiegel
- Manager: Pamela Conti
- League: Liga Femenil
- Clausura 2026: Regular phase: 17th Final phase: Did not qualify
Home colours	Away colours

Querétaro Fútbol Club Femenil is a Mexican women's football club based in the city of Querétaro, Querétaro. The club has been the women's section of Querétaro since 2017. The team currently plays in the Liga Femenil which started in July 2017.

== Personnel ==
=== Club administration ===
Position	Staff
Chairman	(United States) Marc Spiegel
Sporting director	(Mexico) Karen Gómez

=== Coaching staff ===
Position	Staff
Manager	(Italy) Pamela Conti
Assistant managers	(Italy) Vincenzo Conti (Mexico) Gloria Rangel
Fitness coach	(Mexico) Mario Domínguez
Team doctor	(Mexico) Erick Villaseñor
Team doctor assistant	(Mexico) Rogelio Sánchez

== Players ==
=== Current squad ===
As of July 31, 2026

Note: Flags indicate national team as defined under FIFA eligibility rules; some limited exceptions apply. Players may hold more than one non-FIFA nationality.

No.	Pos.	Nation	Player
2	DF	MEX	Nathaly Martínez
3	DF	MEX	María Fernanda Pérez
4	MF	MEX	Fátima Rosales
5	MF	MEX	Amalia López (on loan from Guadalajara)
6	DF	URU	Fátima Barone
7	FW	MEX	Dilary Heredia-Beltrán
8	MF	VEN	Marianyela Jiménez
9	FW	MEX	Sarahí Ceceña
10	MF	ZAM	Grace Chanda
11	FW	USA	Niomi Grimaldo
12	GK	MEX	Karla Morales

No.	Pos.	Nation	Player
13	MF	MEX	Camila Vite
16	DF	USA	Allie George
17	FW	TAN	Enekia Lunyamila
18	FW	URU	Guillermina Grant
20	GK	MEX	Ximena Díaz
21	DF	SLV	Juana Plata
22	DF	MEX	Edith Carmona
23	DF	MEX	Ámbar González
25	MF	JAM	Jade Bailey
28	GK	MEX	Evelyn Torres
30	MF	MEX	Laisha Espinosa
