= Atlético San Luis (women) =

Atlético de San Luis Femenil
- Full name: Atlético de San Luis Femenil
- Nickname: Atleti de San Luis
- Founded: 27 May 2019; 7 years ago
- Ground: Estadio Libertad Financiera; San Luis Potosí, San Luis Potosí
- Capacity: 25,709
- Owner: Atlético de Madrid del Potosí S.A. de C.V.
- Chairman: Jacobo Payán Espinosa
- Manager: Ignacio Quintana
- League: Liga MX Femenil
- Clausura 2026: Regular phase: 11th Final phase: Did not qualify
- Website: atleticodesanluis.mx
Home colours	Away colours

Atlético de San Luis Femenil is a Mexican professional women's football club based in the city of San Luis Potosí, San Luis Potosí that competes in the Liga MX Femenil. The club has been the women's section of Atlético San Luis since 2019.

The team was founded for the 2019–20 Liga MX Femenil season, after the promotion of the men's section to the Liga MX, because the division requires participating teams to have a women's squad to be part of the competition.

== Personnel ==
=== Club administration ===
Position	Staff
Chairman	(Mexico) Jacobo Payán Espinosa
Sporting director	(Mexico) Adriana Águila

=== Technical staff ===
Position	Staff
Manager	(Mexico) Ignacio Quintana
Assistant manager	(Mexico) Oscar García
Fitness coach	(Mexico) Víctor Alvarado
Team doctor	(Mexico) Daniela López
Team doctor assistants	(Mexico) José Ramírez
Team doctor assistants	(Argentina) Facundo Chiappini

== Players ==
=== Current squad ===
As of 31 July 2026

Note: Flags indicate national team as defined under FIFA eligibility rules; some limited exceptions apply. Players may hold more than one non-FIFA nationality.

No.	Pos.	Nation	Player
1	GK	MEX	Valeria Zárate
2	DF	MEX	Karla García
3	DF	USA	Erin Houston
4	DF	MEX	Karen Cano
5	MF	MEX	Citlali Hernández
7	MF	MEX	Viridiana López
8	MF	MEX	Fernanda Sánchez
9	FW	VEN	Enyerliannys Higuera
12	MF	CRC	Alexa Herrera
13	DF	MEX	Aurora Suárez
15	DF	USA	Izabelle Hernández
17	MF	USA	Becky Contreras
19	MF	MEX	Natalia Macías Valadez

No.	Pos.	Nation	Player
21	FW	NGR	Amina Bello
22	MF	MEX	Michelle Gutiérrez
23	GK	MEX	Dayra Bustos
24	DF	MEX	Regina Aguirre
25	MF	USA	Frida Vargas
26	MF	MEX	Aidinn López
27	DF	ESA	Elaily Hernández
28	MF	PER	Sandra Arévalo
30	FW	ARG	Chiara Singarella
31	MF	MEX	Alejandra Caldera
33	MF	MEX	Daniela Delgado (on loan from Guadalajara)
35	MF	MEX	Ximena Ramírez
