= Football at the 2023 Central American and Caribbean Games =

2023 Central American and Caribbean Games Football Tournament

Tournament details
- Host country: El Salvador
- Dates: 28 June – 7 July
- Teams: 7 (men's) + 8 (women's) (from 2 confederations)
- Venue: 1 (in 1 host city)

Final positions
- Champions: Mexico (men's); Mexico (women's)
- Runners-up: Costa Rica (men's); Venezuela (women's)
- Third place: Honduras (men's); El Salvador (women's)
- Fourth place: El Salvador (men's); Centro Caribe Sports (women's)

The 2023 Central American and Caribbean Games football tournament were the 22nd edition of the competition at the 22nd edition of the Central American and Caribbean Games. The tournament was held in Santa Tecla, El Salvador from 24 June to 7 July 2023.

== Medal summary ==
=== Medal table ===
* Host nation (El Salvador)

Rank	Nation	Gold	Silver	Bronze	Total
1	Mexico (MEX)	2	0	0	2
2	Costa Rica (CRC)	0	1	0	1
2	Venezuela (VEN)	0	1	0	1
4	El Salvador (ESA)*	0	0	1	1
4	Honduras (HON)	0	0	1	1
Totals (5 entries)		2	2	2	6

=== Medalists ===
Event	Gold	Silver	Bronze
Men's tournament	Mexico (MEX); Ettson Ayón; Ricardo Monreal; Diego Campillo; Fidel Ambríz; Alí Ávila; Jordan Carrillo; Gael Garcia; Denzell García; Eduardo García; Alejandro Gómez; Bryan Gonzalez; Rafael Guerrero; Rodrigo Huescas; Eduardo Armenta; Rodrigo López; Zahid Muñoz; Óscar Villa; Isaías Violante; Fernando Tapia; Miguel Gómez	Costa Rica (CRC); Andry Naranjo; Keral Rios; Jordy Evans; Gerald Taylor; Joshua Parra; Kenneth Vargas; Bayron Mora; Alejandro Bran; Jorkaeff Azofeifa; Guillermo Villalobos; Douglas Sequeira; Andrey Soto; Abraham Madriz; Jostin Telleria; Matthew Bolanos; Alvaro Zamora; Sebastián Acuña; Doryan Rodriguez	Honduras (HON); Jefryn Macias; Marco Aceituno; Jeffrey Miranda; Pablo Cacho; Anfronit Tatum; Ted Bodden; Jonathan Nunez; Moises Rodriguez; Josman Figueroa; Jose Dominguez; Juergen Garcia; Exon Arzu; Axel Maldonado; Junior Garcia; Dester Monico; José Aguilera; Carlos Matute
Women's tournament	Mexico (MEX); Itzel Gonzalez; Melany Villeda; Vaitiare Robles; Anika Rodriguez; Daniela Monroy; Cristina Ferral; Greta Espinoza; Miah Zuazua; Karla Nieto; Alexia Delgado; Sandra Mayor; Maria Mauleon; Christian Jaramillo; Veronica Corral; Lizbeth Ovalle; Christina Burkenroad; Jasmine Casarez; Kiana Palacios; Diana Garcia; Rebeca Bernal	Venezuela (VEN); Enyerliannys Higuera; Barbara Martinez; Raiderlin Carrasco; Deyna Castellanos; Yessica Velasquez; Gabriela Angulo; Sonia O'Neill; Maria Peraza; Fabiola Solorzano; Floriangel Apostol; Michelle Romero; Ysaura Viso; Nairelis Gutierrez; Paola Villamizar; Veronica Herrera; Sabrina Araujo; Nayluisa Caceres; Marianyla Jimenez; Yenifer Gimenez	El Salvador (ESA); Alejandra Chirino; Victoria Sanchez; Jackeline Velasquez; Danielle Fuentes; Ashley Webb; Priscila Ortiz; Joseline Rivas; Alejandra Morales; Vasthy Delgado; Angie Machado; Danya Gutierrez; Lesly Calderon; Samantha Valadez; Andrea Amaya; Karen Reyes; Elaily Hernandez

== Men's tournament ==
Teams were restricted to players who are 22 years old or younger. Groups were announced on 23 April 2023.

=== Group stage ===
==== Group A ====
Pos	Team	Pld	W	D	L	GF	GA	GD	Pts	Qualification
1	Mexico	2	1	1	0	3	1	+2	4	Advance to knockout stage
2	El Salvador (H)	2	0	2	0	2	2	0	2	Advance to knockout stage
3	Dominican Republic	2	0	1	1	1	3	−2	1	

Source: San Salvador 2023
Rules for classification: Tie-breakers
(H) Hosts

==== Group B ====
Pos	Team	Pld	W	D	L	GF	GA	GD	Pts	Qualification
1	Costa Rica	3	2	0	1	7	1	+6	6	Advance to knockout stage
2	Honduras	3	1	1	1	3	3	0	4	Advance to knockout stage
3	Centro Caribe Sports	3	1	1	1	3	3	0	4	
4	Jamaica	3	0	2	1	2	8	−6	2	

Source: San Salvador 2023
Rules for classification: Tie-breakers

=== Knockout stage ===
Semi-finals
4 July – Santa Tecla
Mexico	3
Honduras	0
4 July – Santa Tecla
Costa Rica	2
El Salvador	1

Gold medal match
6 July – Santa Tecla
Mexico	2
Costa Rica	1
Bronze medal match
6 July – Santa Tecla
Honduras	2
El Salvador	1

== Women's tournament ==
There were no age restrictions for the women's teams. Groups were announced on 23 April 2023.

=== Group stage ===
==== Group A ====
Pos	Team	Pld	W	D	L	GF	GA	GD	Pts	Qualification
1	Venezuela	3	3	0	0	10	1	+9	9	Advance to knockout stage
2	Centro Caribe Sports	3	2	0	1	5	4	+1	6	Advance to knockout stage
3	Costa Rica	3	1	0	2	3	6	−3	3	
4	Haiti	3	0	0	3	2	9	−7	0	

Source: San Salvador 2023
Rules for classification: Tiebreakers

==== Group B ====
Pos	Team	Pld	W	D	L	GF	GA	GD	Pts	Qualification
1	Mexico	3	3	0	0	14	5	+9	9	Advance to knockout stage
2	El Salvador (H)	3	1	1	1	9	7	+2	4	Advance to knockout stage
3	Puerto Rico	3	0	2	1	3	7	−4	2	
4	Jamaica	3	0	1	2	6	13	−7	1	
5	Colombia	0	0	0	0	0	0	0	0	Withdrew

Source: San Salvador 2023
Rules for classification: Tiebreakers
(H) Hosts

=== Knockout stage ===
Semi-finals
5 July – Santa Tecla
Venezuela	2
El Salvador	1
5 July – Santa Tecla
Mexico	6
Centro Caribe Sports	0

Gold medal match
7 July – Santa Tecla
Venezuela	1
Mexico (a.e.t.)	2
Bronze medal match
7 July – Santa Tecla
El Salvador	2
Centro Caribe Sports	1
