= Football at the 2023 Central American and Caribbean Games – Women's team squads =

The following is a list of squads for each nation competing in football at the 2023 Central American and Caribbean Games in El Salvador.

== Group A ==
=== Centro Caribe Sports ===
Head coach: (Costa Rica) Karla Aleman

No.	Pos.	Player	Date of birth (age)	Club
1	GK	Alexia Estrada	29 January 2001 (aged 22)	
2	DF	Luisa Leon	5 May 1995 (aged 28)	
3	FW	Savianna Gomez	12 February 2001 (aged 22)	
4	DF	Jezmin Castellanos	7 November 2002 (aged 20)	
5	MF	Ailyn Juarez	18 June 2002 (aged 21)	
6	DF	Yuvitza Mayén	26 July 1999 (aged 23)	
7	MF	Elisa Texaj	5 February 2003 (aged 20)	
8	FW	María Monterroso	30 November 1993 (aged 29)	
9	FW	Celsa Cruz	12 September 2003 (aged 19)	
10	FW	Andrea Álvarez	13 January 2003 (aged 20)	
11	DF	Naydelin Carrera	19 July 2004 (aged 18)	
12	GK	Angie Hidalgo		
13	FW	Aisha Solórzano	13 April 1998 (aged 25)	
14	FW	Madelyn Ventura	13 February 1997 (aged 26)	
15	FW	Marta Reyes	21 June 2000 (aged 23)	
16	DF	Jemery Myvett	2 March 2004 (aged 19)	
17	DF	Sofía Ovando	20 July 2003 (aged 19)	
18	MF	María Contreras	11 August 1998 (aged 24)	
19	DF	Megan White	17 September 2004 (aged 18)	
20	FW	Ana Lucía Martínez	8 January 1990 (aged 33)	

=== Costa Rica ===
Head coach: (Costa Rica) Patricia Aguilar

No.	Pos.	Player	Date of birth (age)	Club
1	GK	Maria Mendez	19 July 2004 (aged 18)	
2	DF	Abigail Sancho	9 January 2003 (aged 20)	
3	DF	Keilyn Gomez	13 November 2003 (aged 19)	
4	DF	Carolina Angulo	29 July 1993 (aged 29)	
5	MF	Emily Flores	19 November 2001 (aged 21)	
6	MF	Jimena Jimenez	27 July 2006 (aged 16)	
7	MF	Alexa Herrera	16 November 2004 (aged 18)	
8	MF	Priscilla Rodriguez	26 May 2005 (aged 18)	
9	MF	Jasmine Quesada	23 November 2002 (aged 20)	
10	MF	Amelie Araya	4 October 2003 (aged 19)	
12	FW	Fiama Hidalgo	21 September 2003 (aged 19)	
13	MF	Veronica Matarrita	7 November 2005 (aged 17)	
14	FW	Dayona Villanueva	21 August 1996 (aged 26)	
15	MF	Kendry Prieto	24 February 2000 (aged 23)	
16	MF	María José Morales	22 February 1996 (aged 27)	
17	MF	Marian Solano	19 May 2006 (aged 17)	
18	GK	Dayana Perez	20 March 2003 (aged 20)	
19	FW	María Paula Porras	18 March 2002 (aged 21)	
20	DF	Brittany Vasquez	21 August 2006 (aged 16)	

=== Haiti ===
Head coach: (Haiti) Fiorda Charles

No.	Pos.	Player	Date of birth (age)	Club
1	GK	Rose-Manie Joseph	7 January 2005 (aged 18)	
2	FW	Jenny Flore Desmarattes	14 December 2003 (aged 19)	
3		Nadyne Milien	8 July 1998 (aged 24)	
4	MF	Mirlanda Jean	6 March 2005 (aged 18)	
5	FW	Carine Jean	1 December 2004 (aged 18)	
6	FW	Mirlene Dorce	13 December 2003 (aged 19)	
7	DF	Rose-Aliya Marcellus	22 March 2003 (aged 20)	
8	MF	Wideline Charles	20 February 2005 (aged 18)	
9	MF	Withmila Pierre Alcide	3 December 2001 (aged 21)	
10	FW	Guerline Guerrier	14 November 2002 (aged 20)	
11	DF	Deborah Jamina Bien-Aime	16 September 2003 (aged 19)	
12	GK	Marcelda Hilaire	19 January 2003 (aged 20)	
13	MF	Fabiola St Fleur	19 January 2005 (aged 18)	
14	MF	Chloe Amelie Joseph	4 April 2003 (aged 20)	
15	DF	Kiana Dufour	27 April 2005 (aged 18)	
16	FW	Mariline Guerrier	14 July 2003 (aged 19)	
17	FW	Meghane St-Cyr	26 February 2003 (aged 20)	
18	DF	Verlène Estimé	15 September 1997 (aged 25)	
19	MF	Maridza Sylvie Desir	17 August 2004 (aged 18)	
20	MF	Gaëlle Dumas	21 February 2003 (aged 20)	

=== Venezuela ===
Head coach: (Italy) Pamela Conti

No.	Pos.	Player	Date of birth (age)	Club
1	GK	Yessica Velasquez	28 July 1989 (aged 33)	
2	DF	Verónica Herrera	14 January 2000 (aged 23)	
3	DF	Nairelis Gutiérrez	2 July 1995 (aged 27)	
4	DF	María Peraza	17 January 1994 (aged 29)	
5	DF	Yenifer Giménez	3 May 1996 (aged 27)	
6	DF	Michelle Romero	12 June 1997 (aged 26)	
7	FW	Paola Villamizar	30 June 1994 (aged 28)	
8	MF	Sonia O'Neill	19 August 1994 (aged 28)	
9	FW	Deyna Castellanos	18 April 1999 (aged 24)	
10	FW	Marianyela Jimenez	16 April 2004 (aged 19)	
11	FW	Raiderlin Carrasco	11 June 2002 (aged 21)	
12	DF	Sabrina Araujo	11 May 2004 (aged 19)	
13	GK	Nayluisa Cáceres	18 November 1999 (aged 23)	
14	DF	Fabiola Solorzano	22 October 2003 (aged 19)	
16	MF	Barbara Martinez	22 April 2003 (aged 20)	
18	FW	Ysaura Viso	17 June 1993 (aged 30)	
19	FW	Floriangel Apostol	7 September 2005 (aged 17)	
20	DF	Gabriela Angulo	27 February 2004 (aged 19)	

== Group B ==
=== El Salvador ===
Head coach: (El Salvador) Eric Acuña

No.	Pos.	Player	Date of birth (age)	Club
1	GK	Idalia Serrano	22 August 1999 (aged 23)	(Hellenic Football Federation) Volos 2004
2	DF	Juana Plata	7 February 2000 (aged 23)	(Mexican Football Federation) Cruz Azul
3	DF	Priscila Ortiz	7 March 1996 (aged 27)	(Salvadoran Football Federation) Alianza Women
4	DF	Elaily Hernandez	27 May 2000 (aged 23)	(Mexican Football Federation) Atlético de San Luis
5	DF	Vasthy Delgado	26 May 1994 (aged 29)	(Panamanian Football Federation) Santa Fé FC
6	MF	Alejandra Morales	23 August 1990 (aged 32)	
7	MF	Danielle Fuentes	23 August 2000 (aged 22)	(Mexican Football Federation) Cruz Azul
8	MF	Karen Reyes	12 February 1998 (aged 25)	(Mexican Football Federation) Necaxa
9	DF	Joseline Rivas	14 January 1994 (aged 29)	
10	FW	Brenda Cerén	24 September 1998 (aged 24)	(Mexican Football Federation) Atlas
11	FW	Ashley Webb	22 June 1995 (aged 28)	(Salvadoran Football Federation) Alianza Women
12	MF	Jackeline Velasquez	18 September 1995 (aged 27)	(Ecuadorian Football Federation) Ñañas
13	MF	Angie Machado	16 March 2001 (aged 22)	(United States Soccer Federation) Oral Roberts Golden Eagles
14	MF	Danya Gutierrez	12 February 2000 (aged 23)	(Mexican Football Federation) Cruz Azul
15	MF	Paola Calderón	19 March 2002 (aged 21)	(Salvadoran Football Federation) Alianza Women
16	MF	Victoria Meza	22 January 2005 (aged 18)	
17	DF	Andrea Amaya	16 February 2003 (aged 20)	
18	GK	Samantha Valadez	22 December 2002 (aged 20)	
20	DF	Irma Hernández	17 June 2000 (aged 23)	(Salvadoran Football Federation) Alianza Women

=== Jamaica ===
Head coach: (United States) Lorne Donaldson

No.	Pos.	Player	Date of birth (age)	Club
1	GK	Sydney Bellamy	24 August 2003 (aged 19)	
2	FW	Keresha Thomas	20 April 2001 (aged 22)	
3	MF	Destiny Powell	10 April 2007 (aged 16)	
4	FW	Mireya Grey	7 September 1998 (aged 24)	
5	DF	Logan McFadden	17 January 2000 (aged 23)	
6	MF	Shaneil Buckley	20 May 2005 (aged 18)	
7	MF	Sydoney Clarke	30 June 2001 (aged 21)	
8	MF	Dannique Wilson	12 April 2005 (aged 18)	
9	FW	Olufolasade Adamolekun	21 February 2001 (aged 22)	
10	MF	Mikayla Dayes	29 September 1999 (aged 23)	
11	MF	Davia Richards	10 February 2004 (aged 19)	
12	DF	Shanhaine Nelson	5 October 2000 (aged 22)	
13	GK	Chris-Ann Chambers	24 October 1995 (aged 27)	
14	DF	Lauren Reid	8 November 2002 (aged 20)	
15	DF	Maliah Atkins	3 February 2002 (aged 21)	
16	FW	Natoya Atkinson	16 March 2005 (aged 18)	
17	DF	Malikae Dayes	29 September 1999 (aged 23)	
18	DF	Andrene Smith	26 November 2006 (aged 16)	
19	FW	Sheyenne Bonnick	3 February 1998 (aged 25)	
20	FW	Theanna Burnett	18 September 2003 (aged 19)	

=== Mexico ===
Head coach: (Spain) Pedro López

No.	Pos.	Player	Date of birth (age)	Club
1	GK	Itzel González	14 August 1994 (aged 28)	
2	DF	Kenti Robles	15 February 1991 (aged 32)	
3	DF	Rebeca Bernal	31 August 1997 (aged 25)	
4	DF	Greta Espinoza	5 June 1995 (aged 28)	
5	DF	Anika Rodríguez	4 January 1997 (aged 26)	
6	MF	Alexia Delgado	9 December 1999 (aged 23)	
7	FW	Kiana Palacios	1 October 1996 (aged 26)	
8	MF	Carolina Jaramillo	19 March 1994 (aged 29)	
9	FW	Charlyn Corral	11 September 1991 (aged 31)	
10	MF	Stephany Mayor	23 September 1991 (aged 31)	
11	MF	Lizbeth Ovalle	19 October 1999 (aged 23)	
12	GK	Melany Villeda	25 October 2001 (aged 21)	
13	DF	Daniela Monroy	21 September 2002 (aged 20)	
14	FW	Natalia Mauleón	4 February 2002 (aged 21)	
15	MF	Cristina Ferral	16 February 1993 (aged 30)	
16	MF	Karla Nieto	9 January 1995 (aged 28)	
17	FW	Christina Burkenroad	12 July 1993 (aged 29)	
18	FW	Jasmine Casarez	7 January 1997 (aged 26)	
19	DF	Miah Zuazua	27 April 1999 (aged 24)	
20	MF	Diana García	11 November 1999 (aged 23)	

=== Puerto Rico ===
Head coach: (United States) Nat González

No.	Pos.	Player	Date of birth (age)	Club
1	GK	JLo Varada	2 February 2003 (aged 20)	
2	DF	Veronica Garcia	23 December 1999 (aged 23)	
3	MF	Jailene De Jesus	10 May 2003 (aged 20)	
4	DF	Jazmine Mendez	22 July 2003 (aged 19)	
5	DF	Madison Cox	24 October 1995 (aged 27)	
6	DF	Emma Gonzalez	7 May 2004 (aged 19)	
7	FW	Idelys Vázquez	21 September 2000 (aged 22)	
8	FW	Daphane Mendez	22 July 2003 (aged 19)	
9	FW	Taylor Dobles	2 September 2000 (aged 22)	
10	MF	Laura Suárez	28 July 1992 (aged 30)	
11	MF	Cristina Torres	3 October 2000 (aged 22)	
12	GK	Sydney Martinez	12 September 1999 (aged 23)	
13	MF	Nickolette Driesse	8 November 1994 (aged 28)	
14	FW	Jill Aguilera	5 January 1998 (aged 25)	
15	MF	Ana Díaz	26 August 2002 (aged 20)	
17	FW	Juelle Love	18 August 1999 (aged 23)	
18	DF	Josephine Cotto	15 January 2000 (aged 23)	
