= Miah Zuazua =

Mexican footballer (born 1999)

Personal information
- Full name: Miah Alexia Zuazua Martínez
- Date of birth: 27 April 1999 (age 27)
- Place of birth: Texas, United States
- Height: 1.72 m (5 ft 8 in)
- Positions: Winger; attacking midfielder

Team information
- Current team: FC Juárez
- Number: 10

College career
Years	Team	Apps	(Gls)
2018	Southern Miss Golden Eagles	20	(10)

Senior career*
Years	Team	Apps	(Gls)
2019–2020	UANL	19	(3)
2021–2023	FC Juárez	76	(14)
2023–2024	América	37	(4)
2025–	FC Juárez	0	(0)

International career^{‡}
2023–	Mexico	3	(0)
Medal record
Women's football
Representing Mexico
Central American and Caribbean Games
Gold medal – first place	2023 San Salvador
- * Club domestic league appearances and goals as of 17 December 2024 ‡ National team caps and goals as of 8 April 2023

Miah Alexia Zuazua Martínez (born 27 April 1999) is a professional footballer who plays as a midfielder for Liga MX Femenil side FC Juárez. Born and raised in the United States to Mexican parents, she caps for the Mexico women's national team.

== College career ==
Zuazua played college soccer for the Southern Miss Golden Eagles women's soccer team in 2018. She made 20 appearances and scored 10 goals during her stint with the team.

== Club career ==
=== Tigres UANL (2019–2020) ===
Zuazua signed her first professional contract with Liga MX Femenil side Tigres UANL on 19 July 2019. Zuazua made her professional debut with Tigres coming in as a substitute on a match against Pachuca in September 2019. With Tigres, Zuazua made 19 appearances and scored three goals during the three tournaments that she participated with the team.

=== FC Juárez (2020–2023) ===
FC Juárez announced Zuazua as their new player on 31 December 2020, ahead of the Clausura 2021 tournament.

=== América (2023–2024) ===
During the Apertura 2023 tournament, Zuazua was transferred from FC Juárez to Club América, which was the first transaction between two Liga MX Femenil clubs in which a transfer fee was paid.

=== Return to FC Juárez (2025–present) ===
In December 2024, Zuazua returned to FC Juárez, ahead of the Clausura 2025 tournament.

On 8 August 2025, Zuazua was involved in an on-field scuffle with Tijuana's Natividad Martínez in a league match, resulting in both players being banned for four matches. She subsequently issued an apology for her actions on social media.

== International career ==
Zuazua was called to the Mexico women's national football team for the first time in June 2022 by then manager Mónica Vergara for a training camp. In February 2023, Zuazua was selected to be part of the Mexico squad for the 2023 Women's Revelations Cup. She made her debut with the national team on the first match of the 2023 Women's Revelations Cup against Nigeria.

== Career statistics ==
=== International goals ===
No.	Date	Venue	Opponent	Score	Result	Competition
1.	5 July 2023	Estadio Las Delicias, Santa Tecla, El Salvador	Guatemala	5–0	6–0	2023 Central American and Caribbean Games
