= 2023–24 Liga MX Femenil season =

Mexican women's football league season

Liga MX Femenil
- Season: 2023–24
- Champions: Apertura: UANL (6th title); Clausura: Monterrey (3rd title)
- Matches: 306
- Goals: 1,077 (3.52 per match)
- Top goalscorer: Apertura: Alicia Cervantes; Maricarmen Reyes (15 goals); Clausura: Charlyn Corral (19 goals)
- Biggest home win: Apertura: Monterrey 7–0 León (22 July 2023); Clausura: Guadalajara 10–2 Santos Laguna (9 February 2024)
- Biggest away win: Apertura: Santos Laguna 0–7 UANL (21 August 2023); Clausura: Toluca 0–7 UANL (9 February 2024)
- Highest scoring: Apertura: Cruz Azul 3–6 Tijuana (15 October 2023); Clausura: Guadalajara 10–2 Santos Laguna (9 February 2024)
- Longest winning run: Apertura: 8 matches América; Clausura: 9 matches UANL
- Longest unbeaten run: Apertura: 15 matches UANL; Clausura: 12 matches UANL
- Longest winless run: Apertura: 17 matches Mazatlán; Santos Laguna; Clausura: 9 matches Santos Laguna
- Longest losing run: Apertura: 13 matches Mazatlán; Clausura: 7 matches Atlético San Luis
- Highest attendance: Apertura: 20,896; UANL 1–3 Monterrey (19 October 2023); Clausura: 25,545; Monterrey 0–0 UANL (15 March 2024)
- Lowest attendance: Apertura: 135; Cruz Azul 2–0 Atlas (11 September 2023); Clausura: 100; Toluca 1–2 Querétaro (11 April 2024)
- Total attendance: Apertura: 311,081; Clausura: 373,292
- Average attendance: Apertura: 2,072; Clausura: 2,456
- Stats are from the regular phase only Source: Liga MX Femenil

The 2023–24 Liga MX Femenil season is the seventh season of the premier women's football league in Mexico. The season began on 14 July 2023 and finished on 27 May 2024.

== Stadiums and locations ==
América	Atlas	Atlético San Luis	Cruz Azul	Guadalajara
Estadio Azteca	Estadio Jalisco	Estadio Alfonso Lastras	Estadio Azteca	Estadio Akron
Capacity: 81,070	Capacity: 55,110	Capacity: 25,111	Capacity: 81,070	Capacity: 46,232
Juárez	León	Mazatlán	Monterrey	Necaxa
Estadio Olímpico Benito Juárez	Estadio León	Estadio El Encanto	Estadio BBVA	Estadio Victoria
Capacity: 19,703	Capacity: 31,297	Capacity: 25,000	Capacity: 51,348	Capacity: 23,851
Pachuca	Puebla	Querétaro	Santos Laguna	Tijuana
Estadio Hidalgo	Estadio Cuauhtémoc	Estadio Corregidora	Estadio Corona	Estadio Caliente
Capacity: 27,512	Capacity: 51,726	Capacity: 33,162	Capacity: 29,237	Capacity: 27,333
Toluca	UANL	UNAM		
Estadio Nemesio Díez	Estadio Universitario	Estadio Olímpico Universitario		
Capacity: 31,000	Capacity: 41,886	Capacity: 48,297		

== Alternate venues ==
- América – Cancha Centenario No. 5 (Capacity: 1,000)
- América – Estadio Ciudad de los Deportes (Capacity: 34,253)
- Atlas – Estadio Colomos Alfredo 'Pistache' Torres (Capacity: 3,000)
- Atlas – CECAF (Capacity: 1,000)
- Cruz Azul – Instalaciones La Noria (Capacity: 2,000)
- Guadalajara – Verde Valle (Capacity: 800)
- León – La Esmeralda Cancha Sintética (Capacity: 1,000)
- Mazatlán – Centro Deportivo Benito Juárez (Capacity: 1,000)
- Monterrey – El Barrial (Capacity: 570)
- Querétaro - Estadio Olímpico Alameda (Capacity: 4,600)
- Toluca – Instalaciones Metepec (Capacity: 1,000)
- UANL – Instalaciones Zuazua (Capacity: 800)
- UNAM – La Cantera (Capacity: 2,000)
Location of the 2023–24 Liga MX Femenil teams
Location of the 2023–24 Liga MX Femenil teams in Greater Mexico City

== Personnel and kits ==
Team	Chairman	Head coach	Kit manufacturer	Shirt sponsor(s)
América	Santiago Baños	(Spain) Ángel Villacampa	Nike	Caliente
Atlas	José Riestra	(Mexico) Roberto Medina	Charly	Caliente
Atlético San Luis	Jacobo Payán Espinosa	(Mexico) Daniel Flores	Sporelli	Canel's
Cruz Azul	Víctor Velázquez	(Mexico) José Julio Cevada	Pirma	Cemento Cruz Azul
Guadalajara	Amaury Vergara	(Mexico) Joaquín Moreno (Interim)	Puma	Sello Rojo
Juárez	Andrés Fassi	(Spain) Óscar Fernández	Sporelli	
León	Jesús Martínez Murguia	(Mexico) Alejandro Corona	Charly	Cementos Fortaleza, Telcel
Mazatlán	Mauricio Lanz González	(Mexico) José Alonso Madrigal	Pirma	Banco Azteca
Monterrey	José Antonio Noriega	(Costa Rica) Amelia Valverde	Puma	BBVA, Kotex, Tim Hortons
Necaxa	Ernesto Tinajero Flores	(Mexico) Miguel Ramírez	Pirma	Rolcar, Playdoit, JR Romo
Pachuca	Armando Martínez Patiño	(Mexico) Oscar Fernando Torres	Charly	Cementos Fortaleza, Saba, JAC Motors, Telcel
Puebla	Manuel Jiménez García	(Mexico) María José López	Pirma	Banco Azteca
Querétaro	Juan Olvera	(Mexico) Alberto Arellano	Charly	Pedigree Petfoods
Santos Laguna	Dante Elizalde	(Mexico) Karla Maya	Charly	Peñoles, Soriana
Tijuana	Jorge Hank Inzunsa	(Mexico) Juan Manuel Romo	Charly	Caliente
Toluca	Arturo Pérez Arredondo	(Mexico) Gabriel Velasco	New Balance	Arabela
UANL	Mauricio Culebro	(Spain) Mila Martínez	Adidas	Cemex
UNAM	Luis Raúl González	(Brazil) Marcello Frigério	Nike	DHL Express, Mifel

== Format ==
- The Liga MX Femenil season is split into two championships: the Torneo Apertura 2023 (opening tournament) and the Torneo Clausura 2024 (closing tournament). Each is contested in an identical format and includes the same eighteen teams.
- Since 2019–20 season the teams compete in a single group, the best eight of the general table qualify to the championship playoffs.

== Torneo Apertura ==
The Torneo Apertura 2023 is the first tournament of the season. The tournament began on 14 July 2023.

=== Regular season ===
==== Standings ====
Pos	Team	Pld	W	D	L	GF	GA	GD	Pts	Qualification or relegation
1	UANL (C)	17	14	2	1	51	11	+40	44	Advance to Liguilla (Note: The first 8 places in the table qualify for the Liguilla.)
2	América	17	14	0	3	65	23	+42	42	Advance to Liguilla
3	Guadalajara	17	13	3	1	43	11	+32	42	Advance to Liguilla
4	Monterrey	17	11	5	1	41	13	+28	38	Advance to Liguilla
5	Tijuana	17	10	4	3	35	21	+14	34	Advance to Liguilla
6	Toluca	17	9	3	5	28	26	+2	30	Advance to Liguilla
7	Pachuca	17	8	3	6	42	31	+11	27	Advance to Liguilla
8	UNAM	17	8	2	7	37	27	+10	26	Advance to Liguilla
9	Juárez	17	7	5	5	28	23	+5	26	
10	León	17	7	2	8	20	30	−10	23	
11	Cruz Azul	17	7	1	9	25	32	−7	22	
12	Querétaro	17	6	3	8	25	28	−3	21	
13	Atlas	17	5	3	9	20	32	−12	18	
14	Puebla	17	4	2	11	19	42	−23	14	
15	Atlético San Luis	17	3	3	11	17	34	−17	12	
16	Necaxa	17	2	2	13	10	44	−34	8	
17	Santos Laguna	17	0	5	12	12	51	−39	5	
18	Mazatlán	17	0	2	15	12	51	−39	2	

Updated to match(es) played on 6 November 2023. Source: Liga MX Femenil
Rules for classification: 1) Points; 2) Goal difference; 3) Number of goals scored; 4) Head-to-head results between tied teams; 5) Number of goals scored away; 6) Highest relegation coefficient; 7) Fair Play points
(C) Champions

==== Positions by round ====
Qualification to quarter-finals
Last place in table

Team ╲ Round	1	2	3	4	5	6	7	8	9	10	11	12	13	14	15	16	17
UANL	1	2	1	1	2	2	2	2	1	1	1	1	1	1	1	2	1
América	2	1	6	3	1	1	1	1	2	2	2	2	2	2	2	1	2
Guadalajara	7	6	4	6	5	3	3	3	3	3	3	3	3	3	3	3	3
Monterrey	8	4	3	2	3	4	5	5	5	5	5	5	4	4	4	4	4
Tijuana	10	7	9	7	10	8	6	4	4	4	4	4	5	5	5	5	5
Toluca	9	5	5	8	8	10	11	11	9	11	12	12	11	7	7	7	6
Pachuca	3	10	12	10	12	12	12	12	10	6	8	7	6	6	6	6	7
UNAM	17	9	11	11	9	11	8	9	8	10	7	9	8	9	10	9	8
Juárez	11	13	14	12	13	14	13	13	13	13	9	8	9	10	8	8	9
León	4	11	8	5	4	6	7	7	7	9	6	6	7	8	9	10	10
Cruz Azul	5	3	2	4	7	9	10	8	11	7	10	11	10	12	12	12	11
Querétaro	13	8	7	9	6	5	4	6	6	8	11	10	12	11	11	11	12
Atlas	12	14	13	15	15	15	16	16	16	14	14	14	13	13	13	13	13
Puebla	18	17	16	16	16	16	15	15	15	16	15	15	15	15	15	14	14
Atlético San Luis	6	12	10	13	11	7	9	10	12	12	13	13	14	14	14	15	15
Necaxa	16	15	15	14	14	13	14	14	14	15	16	16	16	16	16	16	16
Santos Laguna	15	18	18	18	18	18	18	18	17	17	17	17	17	17	17	17	17
Mazatlán	14	16	17	17	17	17	17	17	18	18	18	18	18	18	18	18	18

Updated to match(es) played on 6 November 2023. Source: Liga MX Femenil

==== Results ====
Each team plays once all other teams in 17 rounds regardless of it being a home or away match.

Home \ Away	AME	ATL	ASL	CAZ	GUA	JUA	LEO	MAZ	MON	NEC	PAC	PUE	QUE	SAN	TIJ	TOL	UNL	UNM
América	—	—	—	4–0	2–1	5–2	—	—	—	5–0	—	—	4–1	6–0	—	4–1	1–3	—
Atlas	1–5	—	2–1	—	1–2	3–2	—	3–1	—	—	—	2–1	0–2	0–0	—	—	—	—
Atlético San Luis	1–4	—	—	—	1–1	—	—	4–1	1–2	1–0	—	—	—	2–0	0–2	0–1	0–1	—
Cruz Azul	—	2–0	3–1	—	1–5	—	0–1	—	0–3	—	—	—	2–1	6–0	3–6	—	—	2–1
Guadalajara	—	—	—	—	—	2–0	2–0	5–0	1–0	—	3–0	2–0	3–1	—	—	—	2–2	3–0
Juárez	—	—	1–1	1–0	—	—	1–0	—	—	6–0	1–1	3–0	2–2	—	—	—	0–4	0–2
León	2–3	1–1	3–0	—	—	—	—	—	—	2–0	0–6	1–0	2–0	—	3–2	0–1	—	—
Mazatlán	1–3	—	—	2–3	—	0–1	0–1	—	—	0–2	—	3–4	—	2–2	0–2	0–3	—	—
Monterrey	2–1	2–0	—	—	—	2–2	7–0	3–1	—	—	2–2	—	3–1	—	—	—	—	0–0
Necaxa	—	0–1	—	1–1	0–3	—	—	—	0–4	—	—	2–1	0–2	2–2	1–2	—	1–3	—
Pachuca	4–2	4–3	3–1	0–2	—	—	—	5–0	—	3–1	—	—	—	—	2–3	—	—	2–1
Puebla	1–6	—	2–2	2–0	—	—	—	—	0–3	—	4–3	—	—	2–1	1–3	—	—	1–1
Querétaro	—	—	4–0	—	—	—	—	0–0	—	—	1–1	3–0	—	—	0–2	1–2	0–4	3–2
Santos Laguna	—	—	—	—	0–3	0–4	2–2	—	1–3	—	1–3	—	1–3	—	0–3	2–2	0–7	—
Tijuana	1–5	1–1	—	—	1–1	0–1	—	—	1–1	—	—	—	—	—	—	3–0	0–0	3–2
Toluca	—	2–1	—	3–0	2–4	1–1	—	—	1–1	2–0	2–1	3–0	—	—	—	—	—	—
UANL	—	2–0	—	1–0	—	—	3–1	6–0	1–3	—	4–2	4–0	—	—	—	3–1	—	3–0
UNAM	2–5	4–1	4–1	—	—	—	2–1	4–1	—	6–0	—	—	—	1–0	—	5–1	—	—

Updated to match(es) played on 6 November 2023. Source: Liga MX Femenil
Legend: Blue = home team win; Yellow = draw; Red = away team win.

=== Regular season statistics ===
==== Top goalscorers ====
Players sorted first by goals scored, then by last name.

Rank	Player	Club	Goals
1	(Mexico) Alicia Cervantes	Guadalajara	15
1	(Mexico) Maricarmen Reyes	UANL	15
3	(Mexico) Charlyn Corral	Pachuca	13
4	(Mexico) Lizbeth Ovalle	UANL	11
4	(Mexico) Kiana Palacios	América	11
6	(Mexico) Christina Burkenroad	Monterrey	10
6	(Mexico) Katty Martínez	América	10
6	(Spain) Andrea Pereira	América	10
9	(Mexico) Desirée Monsiváis	UNAM	9
10	(Mexico) Yashira Barrientos	León	8
10	(Mexico) Jasmine Casarez	Juárez	8
10	(Brazil) Érica Gomes	Cruz Azul	8
10	(Mexico) Adriana Iturbide	Guadalajara	8
10	(Guatemala) Aisha Solórzano	Puebla	8

Source:Liga MX Femenil

==== Hat-tricks ====
Player	For	Against	Result	Date	Round	Ref
(Mexico) Christina Burkenroad	Monterrey	León	7 – 0 (H)	22 July 2023	2	
(Mexico) Katty Martínez	América	Santos	6 – 0 (H)	23 July 2023	2	
(Mexico) Lizbeth Ovalle	UANL	Santos	0 – 7 (A)	21 August 2023	7	
(Mexico) Maricarmen Reyes	UANL	Santos	0 – 7 (A)	21 August 2023	7	
(Mexico) Maricarmen Reyes	UANL	Querétaro	0 – 4 (A)	15 September 2023	11	
(Mexico) Charlyn Corral	Pachuca	León	0 – 6 (A)	8 October 2023	13	
(Mexico) Desirée Monsiváis	UNAM	Necaxa	6 – 0 (H)	9 October 2023	13	
(Brazil) Érica Gomes	Cruz Azul	Santos Laguna	6 – 0 (H)	4 November 2023	17	

(H) – Home; (A) – Away

=== Attendance ===
==== Per team ====
Pos	Team	Total	High	Low	Average	Change
1	UANL	54,384	20,896	3,063	6,043	−10.0%
2	Guadalajara	46,427	8,609	1,082	5,162	−23.6%
3	Monterrey	27,550	7,495	1,397	3,444	−53.5%
4	América	26,457	14,266	417	3,307	−17.9%
5	Pachuca	23,862	6,548	1,406	2,983	+2.3%
6	Toluca	18,331	5,809	989	2,291	+4.5%
7	Juárez	20,174	4,035	1,319	2,242	−22.4%
8	Tijuana	15,431	3,833	1,033	2,204	+35.0%^{1}
9	Atlético San Luis	15,821	3,706	863	1,758	+51.6%
10	UNAM	13,269	4,552	614	1,659	+10.2%
11	Atlas	7,503	3,686	390	1,091	+103.9%^{2}
12	Puebla	7,429	3,559	207	1,061	+38.2%
13	León	7,957	2,740	386	884	+57.9%
14	Necaxa	7,458	2,482	475	838	−43.2%
15	Querétaro	4,465	1,142	330	558	−61.9%
16	Santos Laguna	4,669	959	193	522	−50.8%
17	Mazatlán	4,495	1,133	210	499	+27.9%
18	Cruz Azul	4,329	2,773	135	481	+147.9%
	League total	311,081	20,896	135	2,072	−16.6%

Source: Liga MX
Notes:
Only regular season listed
1: Tijuana played against Toluca behind closed doors due to the climatic conditions derived from the presence of Hurricane Hilary in California and Baja.
2: Atlas played against América behind closed doors because the match was rescheduled due to a storm, also the match was relocated to CECAF instead of Estadio Jalisco due to the poor pitch condition.

Source: Liga MX Femenil

==== Highest and lowest ====
Highest attended					Lowest attended			
Week	Home	Score	Away	Attendance	Home	Score	Away	Attendance
1	UNAM	2–5	América	4,552	León	2–0	Necaxa	513
2	Guadalajara	2–0	Puebla	5,412	Querétaro	4–0	Atlético San Luis	409
3	UANL	6–0	Mazatlán	5,380	Cruz Azul	2–1	UNAM	243
4	Guadalajara	2–2	UANL	8,609	Querétaro	0–2	Tijuana	492
5	UANL	4–2	Pachuca	6,555	Santos Laguna	1–3	Querétaro	510
6	Guadalajara	1–0	Monterrey	6,363	Mazatlán	0–2	Necaxa	390
7	León	2–3	América	2,740	Cruz Azul	1–5	Guadalajara	270
8	Monterrey	0–0	UNAM	4,264	Santos Laguna	0–3	Tijuana	193
9	Guadalajara	2–0	Juárez	5,572	Querétaro	1–2	Toluca	358
10	Pachuca	2–1	UNAM	6,548	Cruz Azul	2–0	Atlas	135
11	América	2–1	Guadalajara	14,266	Mazatlán	0–1	Juárez	340
12	Pachuca	4–2	América	6,448	Cruz Azul	0–1	León	151
13	Toluca	2–4	Guadalajara	5,809	Cruz Azul	3–1	Atlético San Luis	171
14	Guadalajara	2–0	León	4,164	Mazatlán	2–2	Santos Laguna	252
15	Guadalajara	3–0	UNAM	6,191	Cruz Azul	3–6	Tijuana	217
16	UANL	1–3	Monterrey	20,896	Mazatlán	3–4	Puebla	210
17	Monterrey	2–1	América	7,495	Cruz Azul	6–0	Santos Laguna	176

Source: Liga MX

1. Does not include matches played behind closed doors.

=== Liguilla ===
The eight best teams play two games against each other on a home-and-away basis. The higher seeded teams play on their home field during the second leg. The winner of each match up is determined by aggregate score. In the quarterfinals and semifinals, if the two teams are tied on aggregate, the higher seeded team advances. In the final, if the two teams are tied after both legs, the match goes to a penalty shoot-out.

Quarter-finals
1	UANL	3	2	5
8	UNAM	1	1	2
4	Monterrey	2	6	8
5	Tijuana	1	3	4
2	América	6	3	9
7	Pachuca	0	2	2
3	Guadalajara	3	2	5
6	Toluca	0	1	1

Semi-finals
1	UANL	0	1	1
4	Monterrey	0	0	0
2	América	2	2	4
3	Guadalajara	2	1	3

Final
1	UANL	3	0	3
2	América	0	0	0

==== Quarter-finals ====
The first legs were played on 9 and 10 November, and the second legs were played on 12 and 13 November 2023.

Team 1	Agg.	Team 2	1st leg	2nd leg
UANL	5–2	UNAM	3–1	2–1
América	9–2	Pachuca	6–0	3–2
Guadalajara	5–1	Toluca	3–0	2–1
Monterrey	8–4	Tijuana	2–1	6–3

First leg

9 November 2023	Toluca	0–3	Guadalajara	Toluca, State of Mexico
17:00 CST (UTC−6)		Report	Cervantes 11', 72'; Godínez 68'	Stadium: Estadio Nemesio Díez; Attendance: 6,466; Referee: Lizzet Amairany García Olvera (Michoacán)

9 November 2023	Pachuca	0–6	América	Pachuca, Hidalgo
21:06 CST (UTC−6)		Report	Palacios 10'; González 40'; Martínez 50', 54'; Mauleón 64'; Pereira 90' (pen.)	Stadium: Estadio Hidalgo; Attendance: 9,795; Referee: Karen Hernández Andrade (Aguascalientes)

10 November 2023	Tijuana	1–2	Monterrey	Tijuana, Baja California
16:06 PST (UTC−8); 18:06 CST (UTC−6)	Espinosa 89'	Report	Burkenroad 32'; Pérez 66'	Stadium: Estadio Caliente; Attendance: 2,533; Referee: Priscila Eritzel Pérez Borja (Guanajuato)

10 November 2023	UNAM	1–3	UANL	Coyoacán, Mexico City
20:00 CST (UTC−6)	Chavarin 45'	Report	Ferral 48'; Espinoza 62'; Rodríguez 77'	Stadium: Estadio Olímpico Universitario; Attendance: 6,504; Referee: Gustavo Padilla Aguirre (Jalisco)

Second leg

12 November 2023	América	3–2 (9–2 agg.)	Pachuca	Coyoacán, Mexico City
12:00 CST (UTC−6)	Martínez 37', 39'; K. Rodríguez 69'	Report	Ohale 13'; Salazar 17'	Stadium: Estadio Azteca; Attendance: 5,081; Referee: Yonatan Peinado Aguirre (Chihuahua)

12 November 2023	Guadalajara	2–1 (5–1 agg.)	Toluca	Zapopan, Jalisco
21:06 CST (UTC−6)	Cervantes 21', 44'	Report	Bensalem 90'	Stadium: Estadio Akron; Attendance: 7,212; Referee: Francia María González Martínez (Guanajuato)

13 November 2023	UANL	2–1 (5–2 agg.)	UNAM	San Nicolás de los Garza, Nuevo León
19:00 CST (UTC−6)	Cruz 38'; Mayor 90'	Report	Chavarin 62'	Stadium: Estadio Universitario; Attendance: 3,347; Referee: Karen Hernández Andrade (Aguascalientes)

13 November 2023	Monterrey	6–3 (8–4 agg.)	Tijuana	Guadalupe, Nuevo León
21:05 CST (UTC−6)	Giammona 3', 54'; Simental 10'; Pérez 37'; Evangelista 65'; Seoposenwe 68'	Report	Muñoz 45'; Pelayo-Bernal 47', 76'	Stadium: Estadio BBVA; Attendance: 4,768; Referee: Katia Itzel García Mendoza (Mexico City)

==== Semi-finals ====
The first legs were played on 16 and 17 November, and the second legs were played on 19 and 20 November 2023.

Team 1	Agg.	Team 2	1st leg	2nd leg
UANL	1–0	Monterrey	0–0	1–0
América	4–3	Guadalajara	2–2	2–1

First leg

16 November 2023	Guadalajara	2–2	América	Zapopan, Jalisco
21:06 CST (UTC−6)	Cervantes 52', 82'	Report	Martínez 2'; González 12'	Stadium: Estadio Akron; Attendance: 27,401; Referee: Lizzet Amairany García Olvera (Michoacán)

17 November 2023	Monterrey	0–0	UANL	Guadalupe, Nuevo León
19:00 CST (UTC−6)		Report		Stadium: Estadio BBVA; Attendance: 18,290; Referee: Francia María González Martínez (Guanajuato)

Second leg

19 November 2023	América	2–1 (4–3 agg.)	Guadalajara	Coyoacán, Mexico City
16:00 CST (UTC−6)	Palacios 75'; Pereira 79'	Report	Montero 68'	Stadium: Estadio Azteca; Attendance: 13,524; Referee: Katia Itzel García Mendoza (Mexico City)

20 November 2023	UANL	1–0 (1–0 agg.)	Monterrey	San Nicolás de los Garza, Nuevo León
20:00 CST (UTC−6)	Mayor 81'	Report		Stadium: Estadio Universitario; Attendance: 40,039; Referee: Priscila Eritzel Pérez Borja (Guanajuato)

==== Final ====
The first leg was played on 24 November, and the second leg was played on 27 November 2023.

Team 1	Agg.	Team 2	1st leg	2nd leg
UANL	3–0	América	3–0	0–0

First leg

24 November 2023	América	0–3	UANL	Coyoacán, Mexico City
20:00 CST (UTC−6)		Report	Mayor 9'; Reyes 24'; Cruz 57'	Stadium: Estadio Azteca; Attendance: 17,234; Referee: Lizzet Amairany García Olvera (Michoacán)

Second leg

27 November 2023	UANL	0–0 (3–0 agg.)	América	San Nicolás de los Garza, Nuevo León
20:00 CST (UTC−6)		Report		Stadium: Estadio Universitario; Attendance: 38,493; Referee: Karen Hernández Andrade (Aguascalientes)

Apertura 2023 winners

6th title

== Torneo Clausura ==
The Torneo Clausura 2024 is the second tournament of the season. The tournament began on 5 January 2024.

=== Regular season ===
==== Standings ====
Pos	Team	Pld	W	D	L	GF	GA	GD	Pts	Qualification or relegation
1	Monterrey (C)	17	12	2	3	46	12	+34	38	Advance to Liguilla (Note: The first 8 places in the table qualify for the Liguilla.)
2	América	17	11	2	4	47	19	+28	35	Advance to Liguilla
3	UANL	17	14	2	1	51	9	+42	44	Advance to Liguilla
4	Pachuca	17	13	3	1	50	15	+35	42	Advance to Liguilla
5	Guadalajara	17	9	5	3	35	16	+19	32	Advance to Liguilla
6	UNAM	17	8	4	5	44	34	+10	28	Advance to Liguilla
7	León	17	8	4	5	31	24	+7	28	Advance to Liguilla
8	Juárez	17	7	6	4	32	20	+12	27	Advance to Liguilla
9	Toluca	17	7	6	4	34	24	+10	27	
10	Querétaro	17	6	4	7	22	32	−10	22	
11	Tijuana	17	6	3	8	32	31	+1	21	
12	Puebla	17	4	6	7	21	29	−8	18	
13	Atlas	17	4	6	7	17	24	−7	18	
14	Mazatlán	17	4	1	12	20	55	−35	13	
15	Necaxa	17	3	3	11	16	44	−28	12	
16	Cruz Azul	17	2	2	13	18	48	−30	8	
17	Santos Laguna	17	2	2	13	15	65	−50	8	
18	Atlético San Luis	17	1	3	13	16	46	−30	6	

Updated to match(es) played on 4 May 2024. Source: Liga MX Femenil
Rules for classification: 1) Points; 2) Goal difference; 3) Number of goals scored; 4) Head-to-head results between tied teams; 5) Number of goals scored away; 6) Highest relegation coefficient; 7) Fair Play points
(C) Champions

==== Positions by round ====
Qualification to quarter-finals
Last place in table

Team ╲ Round	1	2	3	4	5	6	7	8	9	10	11	12	13	14	15	16	17
UANL	7	1	1	1	1	1	1	1	1	1	1	1	1	1	2	1	1
Pachuca	2	3	7	4	3	2	4	3	2	5	4	2	2	2	3	2	2
Monterrey	8	6	2	2	2	4	3	4	4	2	3	3	3	3	1	3	3
América	5	7	3	3	4	3	2	2	3	3	5	4	4	4	4	4	4
Guadalajara	6	11	5	5	7	5	5	5	5	4	2	5	5	5	5	5	5
UNAM	16	17	17	13	10	12	12	10	10	9	6	7	6	8	8	8	6
León	3	8	4	8	6	7	6	6	6	6	7	8	7	6	6	6	7
Juárez	9	5	8	10	12	8	7	7	8	8	9	6	8	7	7	7	8
Toluca	1	2	6	6	5	6	9	9	7	7	8	9	9	10	9	9	9
Querétaro	10	12	9	11	13	14	14	13	13	13	11	10	10	9	9	10	10
Tijuana	13	9	12	9	11	11	10	11	11	10	10	11	11	11	11	11	11
Atlas	11	13	15	12	9	10	11	12	12	12	12	13	12	13	13	13	12
Puebla	14	10	11	7	8	9	8	8	9	11	13	12	13	12	12	12	13
Mazatlán	17	18	13	15	15	13	13	14	14	14	14	14	14	14	14	14	14
Necaxa	4	4	10	14	14	15	15	15	15	15	15	15	15	15	15	15	15
Cruz Azul	15	15	14	17	17	18	16	17	17	18	18	16	16	16	16	16	16
Santos Laguna	18	16	18	18	18	16	17	18	18	16	17	18	18	18	18	18	17
Atlético San Luis	12	14	16	16	16	17	18	16	16	17	16	17	17	17	17	17	18

Updated to match(es) played on 4 May 2024. Source: Liga MX Femenil

==== Results ====
Each team plays once all other teams in 17 rounds regardless of it being a home or away match.

Home \ Away	AME	ATL	ASL	CAZ	GUA	JUA	LEO	MAZ	MON	NEC	PAC	PUE	QUE	SAN	TIJ	TOL	UNL	UNM
América	—	2–1	2–1	—	—	—	1–2	5–0	4–0	—	2–4	4–1	—	—	4–0	—	—	3–0
Atlas	—	—	—	1–1	—	—	0–3	—	0–1	3–2	1–3	—	—	—	0–4	2–2	0–1	0–2
Atlético San Luis	—	0–0	—	3–5	—	0–3	0–2	—	—	—	1–3	2–2	1–1	—	—	—	—	0–3
Cruz Azul	1–5	—	—	—	—	1–4	—	1–2	—	0–2	1–4	0–4	—	—	—	2–3	1–2	—
Guadalajara	2–1	1–1	4–1	4–0	—	—	—	—	—	4–0	—	—	—	10–2	1–0	1–1	—	—
Juárez	1–1	1–3	—	—	2–0	—	—	3–2	1–0	—	—	—	—	5–1	1–2	0–0	—	—
León	—	—	—	2–1	1–1	1–1	—	3–0	1–4	—	—	—	—	4–0	—	—	2–7	4–1
Mazatlán	—	1–3	3–1	—	0–2	—	—	—	0–3	—	0–5	—	2–2	—	—	—	0–4	2–7
Monterrey	—	—	7–0	5–0	0–1	—	—	—	—	7–0	—	1–0	—	6–0	3–1	1–0	0–0	—
Necaxa	1–1	—	2–1	—	—	1–4	2–1	2–3	—	—	0–4	—	—	—	—	0–0	—	0–5
Pachuca	—	—	—	—	3–0	1–1	0–1	—	2–2	—	—	2–0	4–1	4–0	—	4–0	1–1	—
Puebla	—	0–0	—	—	1–1	3–3	2–1	1–2	—	1–0	—	—	0–1	—	—	1–2	0–6	—
Querétaro	1–5	0–2	—	3–0	1–2	1–1	3–2	—	0–3	1–1	—	—	—	2–1	—	—	—	—
Santos Laguna	0–5	0–0	0–2	0–0	—	—	—	3–2	—	3–2	—	0–1	—	—	—	—	—	2–3
Tijuana	—	—	3–2	0–2	—	—	1–1	4–1	—	3–0	3–4	1–1	1–2	5–2	—	—	—	—
Toluca	3–0	—	5–1	—	—	—	0–0	6–0	—	—	—	—	1–2	7–0	2–1	—	0–7	2–2
UANL	1–2	—	1–0	—	1–0	1–0	—	—	—	3–1	—	—	2–0	7–1	2–0	—	—	—
UNAM	—	—	—	4–2	1–1	2–1	—	—	2–3	—	1–2	3–3	4–1	—	3–3	—	1–5	—

Updated to match(es) played on 4 May 2024. Source: Liga MX Femenil
Legend: Blue = home team win; Yellow = draw; Red = away team win.

=== Regular season statistics ===
==== Top goalscorers ====
Players sorted first by goals scored, then by last name.

Rank	Player	Club	Goals
1	(Mexico) Charlyn Corral	Pachuca	19
2	(Mexico) Katty Martínez	América	15
3	(United States) Stephanie Ribeiro	UNAM	14
4	(Nigeria) Chinwendu Ihezuo	Pachuca	13
5	(Mexico) Stephany Mayor	UANL	12
6	(Mexico) Alicia Cervantes	Guadalajara	11
7	(Mexico) Yashira Barrientos	León	9
7	(Mexico) Jasmine Casarez	Juárez	9
7	(Mexico) Daniela Espinosa	Tijuana	9
7	(United States) Aerial Chavarin	UNAM	9
7	(Brazil) Brenda Woch	Toluca	9

Source:Liga MX Femenil

==== Hat-tricks ====
Player	For	Against	Result	Date	Round	Ref
(Costa Rica) María Paula Salas	Atlas	Mazatlán	1 – 3 (A)	20 January 2024	4	
(Guatemala) Aisha Solórzano	Puebla	Cruz Azul	0 – 4 (A)	21 January 2024	4	
(Mexico) Katty Martínez	América	Santos	0 – 5 (A)	22 January 2024	4	
(Netherlands) Merel van Dongen	Monterrey	Cruz Azul	5 – 0 (H)	25 January 2024	5	
(Brazil) Brenda Woch	Toluca	Mazatlán	6 – 0 (H)	26 January 2024	5	
(Mexico) Alicia Cervantes	Guadalajara	Santos Laguna	10 – 2 (H)	9 February 2024	7	
(Mexico) Katty Martínez	América	Mazatlán	5 – 0 (H)	16 February 2024	8	
(United States) Stephanie Ribeiro	UNAM	Necaxa	0 – 5 (A)	16 February 2024	8	
(Mexico) Myra Delgadillo	Monterrey	Santos Laguna	6 – 0 (H)	4 March 2024	9	
(United States) Stephanie Ribeiro	UNAM	Mazatlán	2 – 7 (A)	28 April 2024	16	

(H) – Home; (A) – Away

=== Attendance ===
==== Per team ====
Pos	Team	Total	High	Low	Average	Change
1	Guadalajara	72,110	21,968	3,087	9,014	+74.6%
2	Monterrey	61,305	25,545	2,115	6,812	+97.8%
3	UANL	53,132	14,194	1,967	6,642	+9.9%
4	Pachuca	31,345	7,771	1,689	3,492	+17.1%
5	Toluca	24,931	5,553	100	2,770	+20.9%
6	UNAM	24,614	8,674	1,474	2,735	+64.9%
7	Juárez	20,949	4,835	1,714	2,619	+16.8%
8	León	12,011	3,641	545	1,501	+69.8%
9	Tijuana	10,964	2,133	633	1,371	−37.8%^{1}
10	América	10,925	4,609	276	1,214	−63.3%
11	Puebla	8,969	3,280	253	997	−6.0%
12	Atlético San Luis	7,485	1,602	582	936	−46.8%
13	Necaxa	7,466	2,616	246	933	+11.3%
14	Querétaro	8,258	1,754	495	918	+64.5%
15	Santos Laguna	4,181	1,107	252	523	+0.2%
16	Atlas	4,569	988	195	508	−53.4%
17	Mazatlán	3,495	742	212	437	−12.4%
18	Cruz Azul	1,681	330	148	210	−56.3%
	League total	373,292	25,545	100	2,456	+18.5%

Source: Liga MX
Notes:
Only regular season listed
1: Tijuana played against Puebla behind closed doors due to weather conditions.

Source: Liga MX Femenil

==== Highest and lowest ====
Highest attended					Lowest attended			
Week	Home	Score	Away	Attendance	Home	Score	Away	Attendance
1	UANL	1–0	Atlético San Luis	8,405	Cruz Azul	0–2	Necaxa	182
2	Juárez	2–0	Guadalajara	4,063	Santos Laguna	0–0	Cruz Azul	355
3	Guadalajara	4–1	Atlético San Luis	3,680	Cruz Azul	1–2	Mazatlán	148
4	Guadalajara	1–1	Toluca	4,569	Cruz Azul	0–4	Puebla	224
5	UANL	2–0	Tijuana	7,344	Atlas	3–2	Necaxa	367
6	América	4–0	Monterrey	4,609	Mazatlán	3–1	Atlético San Luis	231
7	Toluca	0–7	UANL	4,853	Atlas	0–4	Tijuana	327
8	Monterrey	1–0	Toluca	3,862	Cruz Azul	1–4	Pachuca	214
9	Toluca	3–0	América	5,553	Querétaro	3–0	Cruz Azul	495
10	UANL	2–0	Querétaro	4,124	Cruz Azul	1–4	Juárez	176
11	Monterrey	0–0	UANL	25,545	Puebla	1–2	Mazatlán	544
12	UANL	1–0	Guadalajara	14,194	Mazatlán	2–2	Querétaro	212
13	Guadalajara	1–1	Atlas	19,563	Cruz Azul	1–5	América	330
14	UANL	1–2	América	10,047	Toluca	1–2	Querétaro	100
15	Pachuca	3–0	Guadalajara	7,040	Cruz Azul	2–3	Toluca	152
16	Guadalajara	4–0	Cruz Azul	9,183	Mazatlán	2–7	UNAM	359
17	Pachuca	1–1	UANL	7,771	Santos Laguna	3–2	Mazatlán	252

Source: Liga MX

1. Does not include matches played behind closed doors.

=== Liguilla ===
The eight best teams play two games against each other on a home-and-away basis. The higher seeded teams play on their home field during the second leg. The winner of each match up is determined by aggregate score. In the quarterfinals and semifinals, if the two teams are tied on aggregate, the higher seeded team advances. In the final, if the two teams are tied after both legs, the match goes to a penalty shoot-out.

Quarter-finals
2	Pachuca	4	1	5
7	León	1	0	1
3	Monterrey	2	1	3
6	UNAM	0	0	0
1	UANL	1	1	2
8	Juárez	0	1	1
4	América	2	4	6
5	Guadalajara	0	1	1

Semi-finals
2	Pachuca	0	2	2
3	Monterrey	2	4	6
1	UANL	1	1	2
4	América	3	0	3

Final
3	Monterrey (p)	0	2	2 (4)
4	América	1	1	2 (3)

==== Quarter-finals ====
The first legs were played on 9 and 10 May, and the second legs were played on 12 and 13 May 2024.

Team 1	Agg.	Team 2	1st leg	2nd leg
UANL	2–1	Juárez	1–0	1–1
Pachuca	5–1	León	4–1	1–0
Monterrey	3–0	UNAM	2–0	1–0
América	6–1	Guadalajara	2–0	4–1

First leg

9 May 2024	León	1–4	Pachuca	León, Guanajuato
19:05 CST (UTC−6)	Calderón 74'	Report	Corral 10'; Ihezuo 44', 63'; Quejada 47'	Stadium: Estadio León; Attendance: 4,936; Referee: Orlando Delgadillo Franco (Jalisco)

9 May 2024	Guadalajara	0–2	América	Zapopan, Jalisco
21:06 CST (UTC−6)		Report	Luebbert 32'; Martínez 35'	Stadium: Estadio Akron; Attendance: 11,136; Referee: Francia María González Martínez (Guanajuato)

10 May 2024	UNAM	0–2	Monterrey	Mexico City
19:00 CST (UTC−6)		Report	Pérez 54'; Del Campo 68'	Stadium: Estadio Olímpico Universitario; Attendance: 2,718; Referee: Edgar Ulises Rangel Araujo (Mexico City)

10 May 2024	Juárez	0–1	UANL	Ciudad Juárez, Chihuahua
21:06 MDT (UTC−6)		Report	Reyes 65'	Stadium: Estadio Olímpico Benito Juárez; Attendance: 5,507; Referee: Gustavo Padilla Aguirre (Jalisco)

Second leg

12 May 2024	América	4–1 (6–1 agg.)	Guadalajara	Mexico City
12:00 CST (UTC−6)	Aviléz 38'; Luebbert 45'; Cuevas 50'; Mauleón 62'	Report	Cervantes 4'	Stadium: Estadio Azteca; Attendance: 4,877; Referee: Priscila Eritzel Pérez Borja (Guanajuato)

12 May 2024	Pachuca	1–0 (5–1 agg.)	León	Pachuca, Hidalgo
19:06 CST (UTC−6)	Corral 61'	Report		Stadium: Estadio Hidalgo; Attendance: 3,150; Referee: Katia Itzel García (Mexico City)

13 May 2024	UANL	1–1 (2–1 agg.)	Juárez	San Nicolás de los Garza, Nuevo León
19:00 CST (UTC−6)	Reyes 90+2'	Report	Chilufya 64'	Stadium: Estadio Universitario; Attendance: 5,284; Referee: Karen Hernández Andrade (Aguascalientes)

13 May 2024	Monterrey	1–0 (3–0 agg.)	UNAM	Guadalupe, Nuevo León
21:00 CST (UTC−6)	Seoposenwe 66'	Report		Stadium: Estadio BBVA; Attendance: 4,301; Referee: Lizzet Amairany García Olvera (Michoacán)

==== Semi-finals ====
The first legs were played on 17 May, and the second legs will be played on 20 May 2024.

Team 1	Agg.	Team 2	1st leg	2nd leg
UANL	2–3	América	1–3	1–0
Pachuca	2–6	Monterrey	0–2	2–4

First leg

17 May 2024	Monterrey	2–0	Pachuca	Guadalupe, Nuevo León
19:00 CST (UTC−6)	Delgadillo 24'; Bernal 72' (pen.)	Report		Stadium: Estadio BBVA; Attendance: 11,896; Referee: Karen Hernández Andrade (Aguascalientes)

17 May 2024	América	3–1	UANL	Mexico City
21:00 CST (UTC−6)	Luebbert 21', 67'; Palacios 81'	Report	Ovalle 51'	Stadium: Estadio Azteca; Attendance: 5,715; Referee: Héctor Salvador Solorio Arreola (Jalisco)

Second leg

20 May 2024	UANL	1–0 (2–3 agg.)	América	San Nicolás de los Garza, Nuevo León
19:00 CST (UTC−6)	Ovalle 90+3' (pen.)	Report		Stadium: Estadio Universitario; Attendance: 16,795; Referee: Edgar Ulises Rangel Araujo (Mexico City)

20 May 2024	Pachuca	2–4 (2–6 agg.)	Monterrey	Pachuca, Hidalgo
21:00 CST (UTC−6)	Soto 15'; Corral 86'	Report	Burkenroad 32', 36', 53'; Pérez 45'	Stadium: Estadio Hidalgo; Attendance: 11,401; Referee: Francia María González Martínez (Guanajuato)

==== Final ====
The first leg was played on 24 May, and the second leg was played on 27 May 2024.

Team 1	Agg.	Team 2	1st leg	2nd leg
Monterrey (p)	2–2 (4–3)	América	0–1	2–1

First leg

24 May 2024	América	1–0	Monterrey	Mexico City
21:05 CST (UTC−6)	Palacios 45'	Report		Stadium: Estadio Azteca; Attendance: 23,770; Referee: Katia Itzel García (Mexico City)

Second leg

27 May 2024	Monterrey	2–1 (2–2 agg.) (4–3 p)	América	Guadalupe, Nuevo León
20:00 CST (UTC−6)	Seoposenwe 25'; Bernal 90+11' (pen.)	Report	Luebbert 9'	Stadium: Estadio BBVA; Attendance: 31,478; Referee: Francia María González Martínez (Guanajuato)
	Penalties
	Franco (penalty scored); Bernal (penalty scored); Martínez (penalty missed); Van Dongen (penalty scored); Del Campo (penalty scored)		K. Rodríguez (penalty scored); Luna (penalty missed); Palacios (penalty scored); Pereira (penalty scored); Aviléz (penalty missed)

Clausura 2024 winners

3rd title

== Aggregate table ==
The aggregate table (the sum of points of both the Apertura 2023 and Clausura 2024 tournaments) will be used to determine seeds in the Campeón de Campeones and the place of best runner–up for the 2024–25 CONCACAF W Champions Cup.

Pos	Team	Pld	W	D	L	GF	GA	GD	Pts	Qualification or relegation
1	UANL (A, Q)	34	28	4	2	102	20	+82	88	Qualification for the 2024–25 CONCACAF W Champions Cup
2	América (U, Q)	34	25	2	7	112	42	+70	77	Qualification for the 2024–25 CONCACAF W Champions Cup
3	Monterrey (X, Q)	34	23	7	4	87	25	+62	76	Qualification for the 2024–25 CONCACAF W Champions Cup
4	Guadalajara	34	22	8	4	78	27	+51	74	
5	Pachuca	34	21	6	7	92	46	+46	69	
6	Toluca	34	16	9	9	62	50	+12	57	
7	Tijuana	34	16	7	11	67	52	+15	55	
8	UNAM	34	16	6	12	81	61	+20	54	
9	Juárez	34	14	11	9	60	43	+17	53	
10	León	34	15	6	13	51	54	−3	51	
11	Querétaro	34	12	7	15	47	60	−13	43	
12	Atlas	34	9	9	16	37	56	−19	36	
13	Puebla	34	8	8	18	40	71	−31	32	
14	Cruz Azul	34	9	3	22	43	80	−37	30	
15	Necaxa	34	5	5	24	26	88	−62	20	
16	Atlético San Luis	34	4	6	24	33	80	−47	18	
17	Mazatlán	34	4	3	27	32	106	−74	15	
18	Santos Laguna	34	2	7	25	27	116	−89	13	

Updated to match(es) played on 5 May 2024. Source: Liga MX Femenil
Rules for classification: 1) Points; 2) Goal difference; 3) Number of goals scored; 4) Head-to-head results between tied teams; 5) Number of goals scored away; 6) Highest relegation coefficient; 7) Fair Play points
(A) Apertura champion; (Q) Qualified for the phase indicated; (U) Apertura and Clausura runner-up; (X) Clausura champion

== Campeón de Campeonas ==
On May 24, 2021, the Liga MX Owners Assembly made official the creation of the Campeón de Campeonas ("Champion of Women's Champions"), a tournament between the two winning teams of the season's tournaments made with the goal of premiering the best team in all the annual cycle of Mexican women's football.

Team 1	Agg.	Team 2	1st leg	2nd leg
UANL	3–2	Monterrey	0–0	3–2

First leg

27 June 2024	Monterrey	0–0	UANL	Guadalupe, Nuevo León
21:00		Report		Stadium: Estadio BBVA; Attendance: 11,930; Referee: Lizzet Amairany García Olvera (Michoacán)

Second leg

1 July 2024	UANL	3–2 (3–2 agg.)	Monterrey	San Nicolás de los Garza, Nuevo León
21:00	Kgatlana 49'; Mayor 69'; Rangel 85'	Report	Bernal 35'; Seoposenwe 77'	Stadium: Estadio Universitario; Attendance: 17,681; Referee: Katia Itzel García Mendoza (Mexico City)

2023–24 winners

3rd title
