= Guillermo Villalobos (footballer) =

Costa Rican footballer (born 2006)

Personal information
- Full name: Guillermo Villalobos Alfaro
- Date of birth: 7 June 2001 (age 25)
- Place of birth: San Rafael, Costa Rica
- Height: 1.83 m (6 ft 0 in)
- Position: Centre-back

Team information
- Current team: Alajuelense
- Number: 4

Youth career
- Alajuelense
- 2019–2020: Santa Ana

Senior career*
| Years | Team | Apps | (Gls) |
| 2020–2021 | Santa Ana | 2 | (0) |
| 2021–2023 | Pérez Zeledón | 64 | (2) |
| 2023– | Alajuelense | 91 | (5) |

International career^{‡}
| 2023 | Costa Rica U23 | 10 | (0) |
| 2025– | Costa Rica | 4 | (0) |
- * Club domestic league appearances and goals as of 15:13, 28 January 2026 (UTC) ‡ National team caps and goals as of 15:13, 28 January 2026 (UTC)

Guillermo Villalobos Alfaro (born 7 June 2001) is a Costa Rican professional footballer who plays as a centre-back for Liga FPD club Alajuelense and the Costa Rica national team.

== Club career ==
A youth product of Alajuelense, at 18 Villalobos moved to Santa Ana and debuted with them in the Segunda División de Costa Rica in 2021. On 8 January 2021, he moved to Liga FPD side Pérez Zeledón on a 2-year contract. On 5 June 2023, he returned to Alajuelense on a contract until 2026. He helped them win the 2023 Costa Rican Cup in his debut season. On 4 January 2025, he extended his contract with Alajuelense for 2.5 years. He helped the squad win three consecutive CONCACAF Central American Cups, from 2023 to 2025.

== International career ==
Villalobos played for the Costa Rica U23s at the 2023 Maurice Revello Tournament. In June 2025, he was first called up to the senior Costa Rica national team for the 2025 CONCACAF Gold Cup.

== Honours ==
Alajuelense

- Liga FPD: 2025–26
- Costa Rican Cup: 2023, 2024–25
- Supercopa de Costa Rica: 2024
- CONCACAF Central American Cup: 2023, 2024, 2025

Costa Rica U23

- Central American and Caribbean Games: 2023 (runners-up)
