= Victoria Meza =

Salvadoran footballer (born 2005)

Personal information
- Full name: Victoria Saraí Sánchez Meza
- Date of birth: 22 January 2005 (age 21)
- Place of birth: El Salvador
- Position: Forward

Youth career
- 2019–2021: College Cup Elite Academy

College career
Years	Team	Apps	(Gls)
2023–	Texas State Bobcats	37	(8)

International career^{‡}
2023–	El Salvador U20	3	(2)
2021–	El Salvador	2	(0)
Medal record
Women's football
Representing El Salvador
Central American and Caribbean Games
Bronze medal – third place	2023 San Salvador
- ‡ National team caps and goals as of 21 April 2023.

Victoria Saraí Sánchez Meza (born 22 January 2005), known as Victoria Meza, is a Salvadoran footballer who plays as a forward for the El Salvador women's national team.

== Youth career and College career ==
Meza has played for College Cup in El Salvador. Meza plays for Texas State Bobcats in San Marcos, Texas

== International career ==
Meza made her senior debut for El Salvador on 8 April 2021.

== Personal life ==
Meza's uncle is Mario Mayén Meza.

== International goals ==
Scores and results list El Salvador's goal tally first.

No.	Date	Venue	Opponent	Score	Result	Competition
1.	7 July 2023	Estadio Las Delicias, Santa Tecla, El Salvador	Guatemala	2–1	2–1	2023 Central American and Caribbean Games
2.	31 May 2024	Estadio Félix Capriles, Cochabamba, Bolivia	Bolivia	1–1	2–1	Friendly
3.	31 May 2024	Estadio Félix Capriles, Cochabamba, Bolivia	Bolivia	2–1	2–1	Friendly
4.	3 June 2024	Estadio Félix Capriles, Cochabamba, Bolivia	Bolivia	1–0	2–0	Friendly
5.	13 July 2024	Estadio Las Delicias, Santa Tecla, El Salvador	Peru	1–1	3–1	Friendly
6.	2 December 2025	Estadio Jorge "El Mágico" González, San Salvador, El Salvador	Honduras	3–0	3–0	2025/2026 CONCACAF Qualifiers

== See also ==
- List of El Salvador women's international footballers
