= Jasmine Casarez =

Mexican footballer (born 1997)

Personal information
- Full name: Jasmine Alexis Casarez
- Date of birth: 7 January 1997 (age 29)
- Place of birth: Moreno Valley, California, United States
- Height: 1.73 m (5 ft 8 in)
- Position: Winger

Team information
- Current team: Guadalajara
- Number: 23

College career
| Years | Team | Apps | (Gls) |
| 2015–2018 | Radford Highlanders | 69 | (33) |

Senior career*
| Years | Team | Apps | (Gls) |
| 2019–2022 | Puerto Rico Sol | | |
| 2022–2025 | Juárez | 51 | (16) |
| 2026– | Guadalajara | 5 | (1) |

International career^{‡}
| 2023– | Mexico | 6 | (4) |
- * Club domestic league appearances and goals as of 1 February 2026 ‡ National team caps and goals as of 12 March 2022

Jasmine Alexis Casarez (born 7 January 1997) is a professional footballer who plays as a forward for Liga MX Femenil side Guadalajara. Born and raised in the United States, she plays for the Mexico national team.

== Career ==
=== Puerto Rico Sol (2019–2022) ===
In October 2019, she signed with Puerto Rico Sol.

=== Juárez (2022–2025) ===
In February 2022, she was announced as a player for Juárez, becoming the first foreign-born player of the team.

=== Guadalajara (2026) ===
In December 2025 it was reported that Casarez signed with C.D. Guadalajara

== International career ==
Casarez made her debut for the Mexico women's national team on 8 April 2023 in a friendly against Chicago Red Stars.

Casarez was part of the Mexico's team that won the gold medal in the 2023 Central American and Caribbean Games. Casarez played all of Mexico's five matches, and scoring four goals.

== Career statistics ==
=== Club ===
As of match played 4 June 2023

Appearances and goals by club, season and competition
| Club | Season | League | | | Total | |
| Club | Season | Division | Apps | Goals | Apps | Goals |
|---|---|---|---|---|---|---|
| Juárez | 2021–22 | Liga MX Femenil | 13 | 3 | 13 | 3 |
| Juárez | 2022–23 | Liga MX Femenil | 34 | 10 | 34 | 10 |
| Juárez | 2023–24 | Liga MX Femenil | 4 | 3 | 4 | 3 |
| Juárez | Total | | 51 | 16 | 51 | 16 |
| Career total | | | 51 | 16 | 51 | 16 |

=== International goals ===
| No. | Date | Venue | Opponent | Score | Result | Competition |
|---|---|---|---|---|---|---|
| 1. | 29 June 2023 | Estadio Las Delicias, Santa Tecla, El Salvador | Puerto Rico | 1–0 | 4–0 | 2023 Central American and Caribbean Games |
| 2. | 29 June 2023 | Estadio Las Delicias, Santa Tecla, El Salvador | Puerto Rico | 3–0 | 4–0 | 2023 Central American and Caribbean Games |
| 3. | 1 July 2023 | Estadio Las Delicias, Santa Tecla, El Salvador | El Salvador | 1–0 | 3–2 | 2023 Central American and Caribbean Games |
| 4. | 1 July 2023 | Estadio Las Delicias, Santa Tecla, El Salvador | El Salvador | 3–1 | 3–2 | 2023 Central American and Caribbean Games |
| 5. | 23 February 2024 | Dignity Health Sports Park, Carson, United States | Dominican Republic | 7–0 | 8–0 | 2024 CONCACAF W Gold Cup |
| 6. | 30 May 2025 | Estadio Universitario BUAP, Puebla, Mexico | Uruguay | 2–0 | 2–2 | Friendly |
