= Deyna Castellanos =

Venezuelan footballer (born 1999)

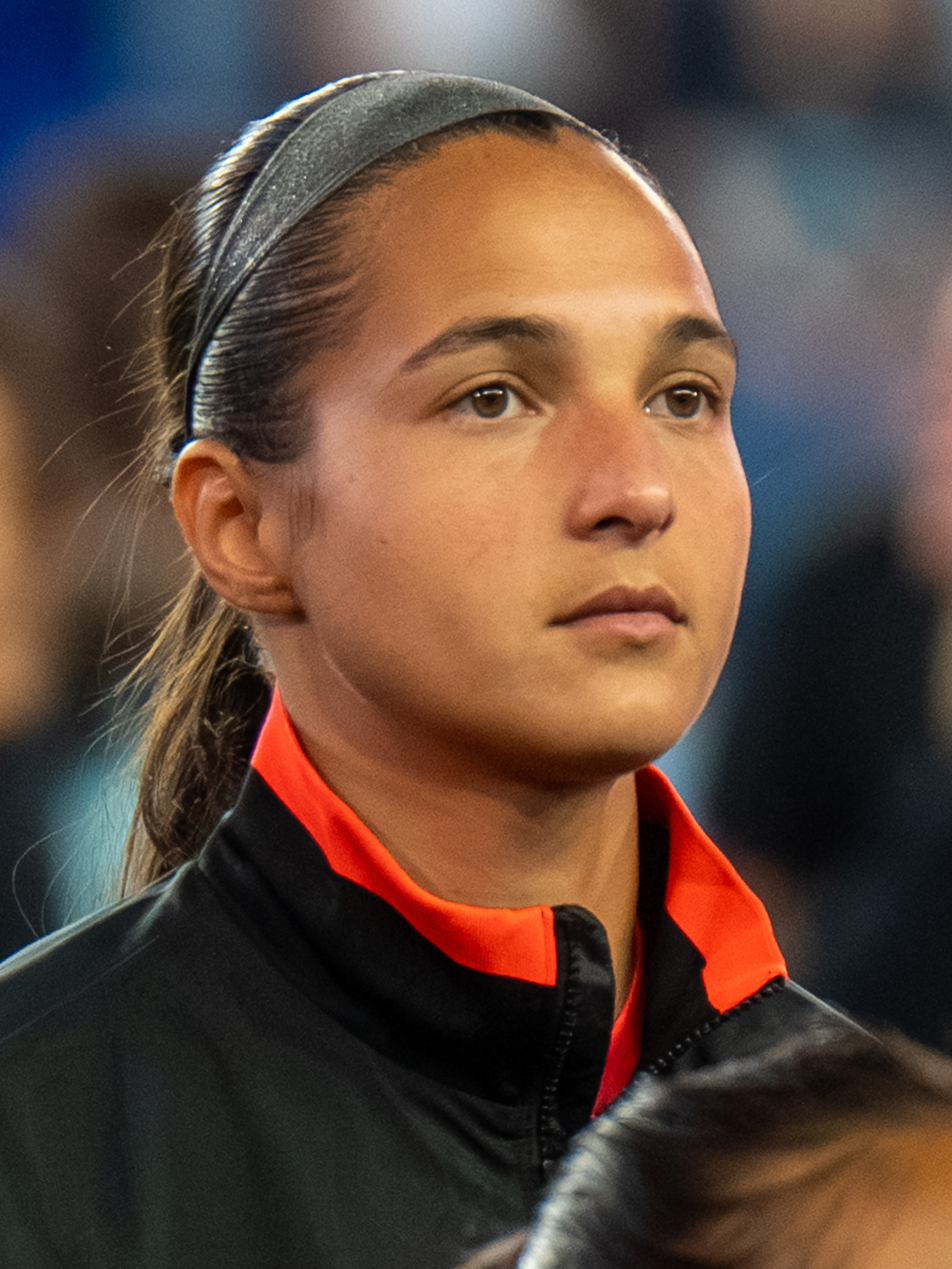
- Castellanos with the Portland Thorns in September 2025

Personal information
- Full name: Deyna Cristina Castellanos Naujenis
- Date of birth: 18 April 1999 (age 27)
- Place of birth: Maracay, Venezuela
- Height: 1.70 m (5 ft 7 in)
- Positions: Attacking midfielder; forward

Team information
- Current team: Tigres UANL
- Number: 10

Youth career
- 2013–2016: Escuela de Fútbol Juan Arango

College career
Years	Team	Apps	(Gls)
2016–2019	Florida State Seminoles	82	(48)

Senior career*
Years	Team	Apps	(Gls)
2020–2022	Atlético Madrid	58	(23)
2022–2024	Manchester City	24	(1)
2024	Bay FC	21	(2)
2025–2026	Portland Thorns	31	(3)
2026–	Tigres UANL	8	(0)

International career^{‡}
2013–2016	Venezuela U17	39	(35)
2018	Venezuela U20	6	(4)
2014–	Venezuela	54	(26)
Medal record
Women's football
Representing Venezuela
Central American and Caribbean Games
Silver medal – second place	2023 San Salvador
- * Club domestic league appearances and goals as of 02:20, 10 September 2026 (UTC) ‡ National team caps and goals as of 08:39, 29 September 2023 (UTC)

Deyna Cristina Castellanos Naujenis (born 18 April 1999) is a Venezuelan professional footballer who plays as an attacking midfielder or forward for Liga Femenil club Tigres UANL and the Venezuela national team. She played college soccer for the Florida State Seminoles, where she won the national championship in 2018. She has previously been a member of Liga F club Atlético Madrid, Women's Super League club Manchester City, and National Women's Soccer League (NWSL) clubs Bay FC and the Portland Thorns.

== College career ==
Castellanos was born in Maracay, on the Caribbean coast of Venezuela. She was awarded a scholarship to study journalism and play football at Florida State University, an experience she has described as life-changing. She spent three college years with the Florida State Seminoles, scoring 48 goals in 82 total appearances. In 2018, she contributed to an NCAA national title.

== Club career ==
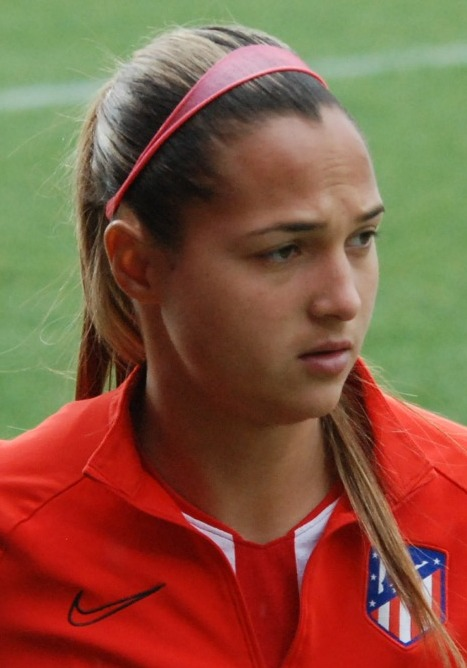
Castellanos with Atlético Madrid in 2020

After leaving Florida State, Castellanos elected not to enter her name into the 2020 NWSL College Draft due to the lack of player autonomy afforded to her by the draft system. Instead, she signed her first professional contract with Spanish club Atlético Madrid on 2 January 2020, inking a two-year deal.

At the end of this contract, Castellanos moved to English club Manchester City in the Women's Super League (WSL), where she signed a three-year contract on 3 June 2022; she was described as the marquee signing during a high-turnover summer for the club. She made her Manchester City debut on 18 August 2022, in a 6–0 Champions League win against Kazakhstani side Tomaris-Turan, scoring a penalty in the 89th minute. On 18 September 2022, she made her WSL debut, coming on in the 70th minute during a 4–3 defeat by Aston Villa.

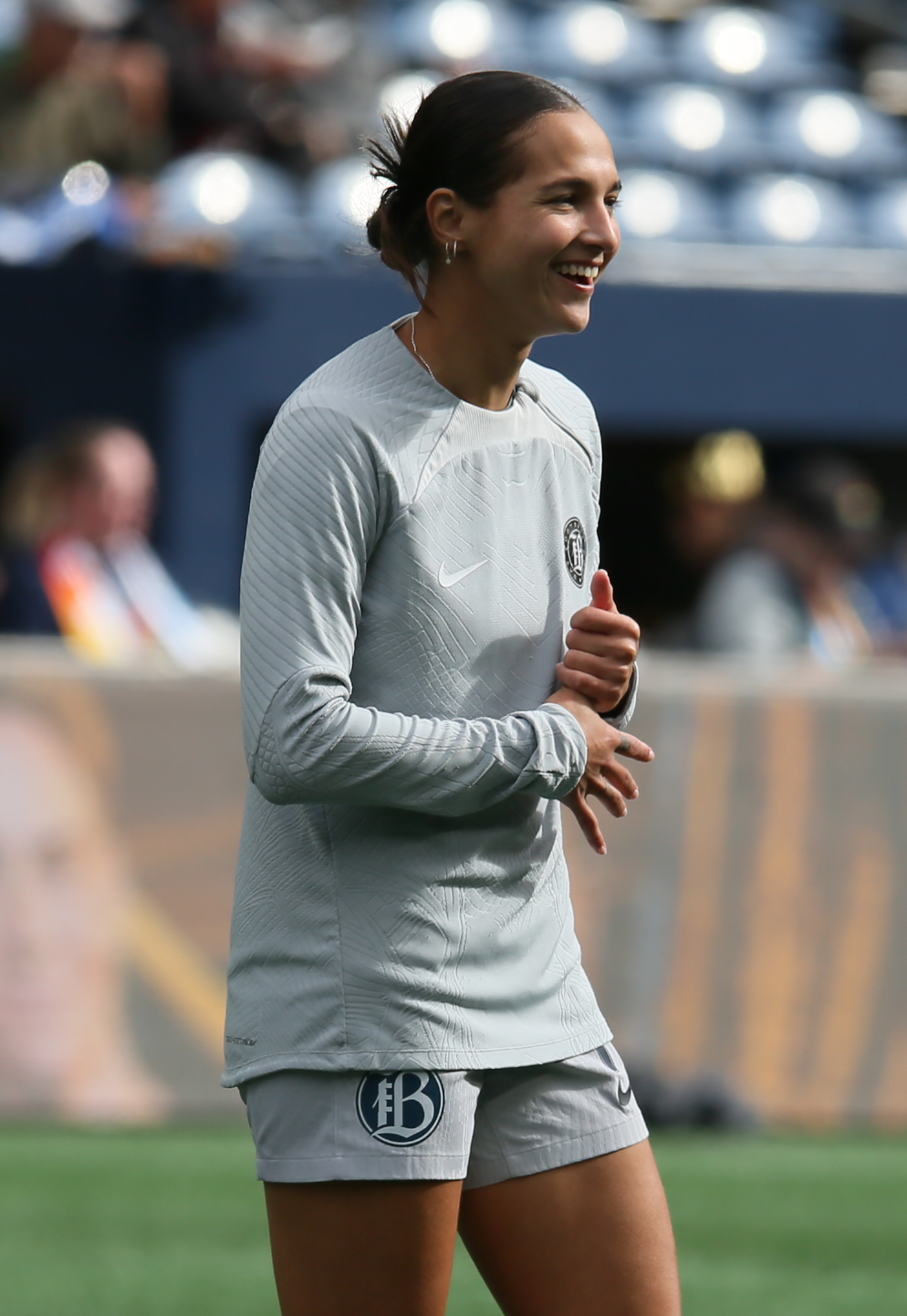
Castellanos with Bay FC in 2024

On 26 January 2024, Castellanos was acquired by new NWSL expansion franchise Bay FC for a transfer fee. In the 2024 season, Castellanos appeared in 20 matches, starting 12, and scored 2 goals.

On 23 January 2025, Bay FC announced that they had bought out the remainder of her contract, making her a free agent. The next day, Castellanos was acquired by NWSL team Portland Thorns FC and signed to a two-year contract with a club option. She made her Thorns debut in the league's season-opener, starting and playing 87 minutes in a defeat to the Kansas City Current. Castellanos scored her first goal with her new club on 22 April 2025, helping the Thorns beat NJ/NY Gotham FC 4–1.

In September 2026, having made 33 appearances for the Thorns across all competitions, Castellanos departed Portland on a mutual contract termination. Shortly afterwards she signed with Liga MX Femenil team Tigres UANL.

== International career ==
=== Youth ===
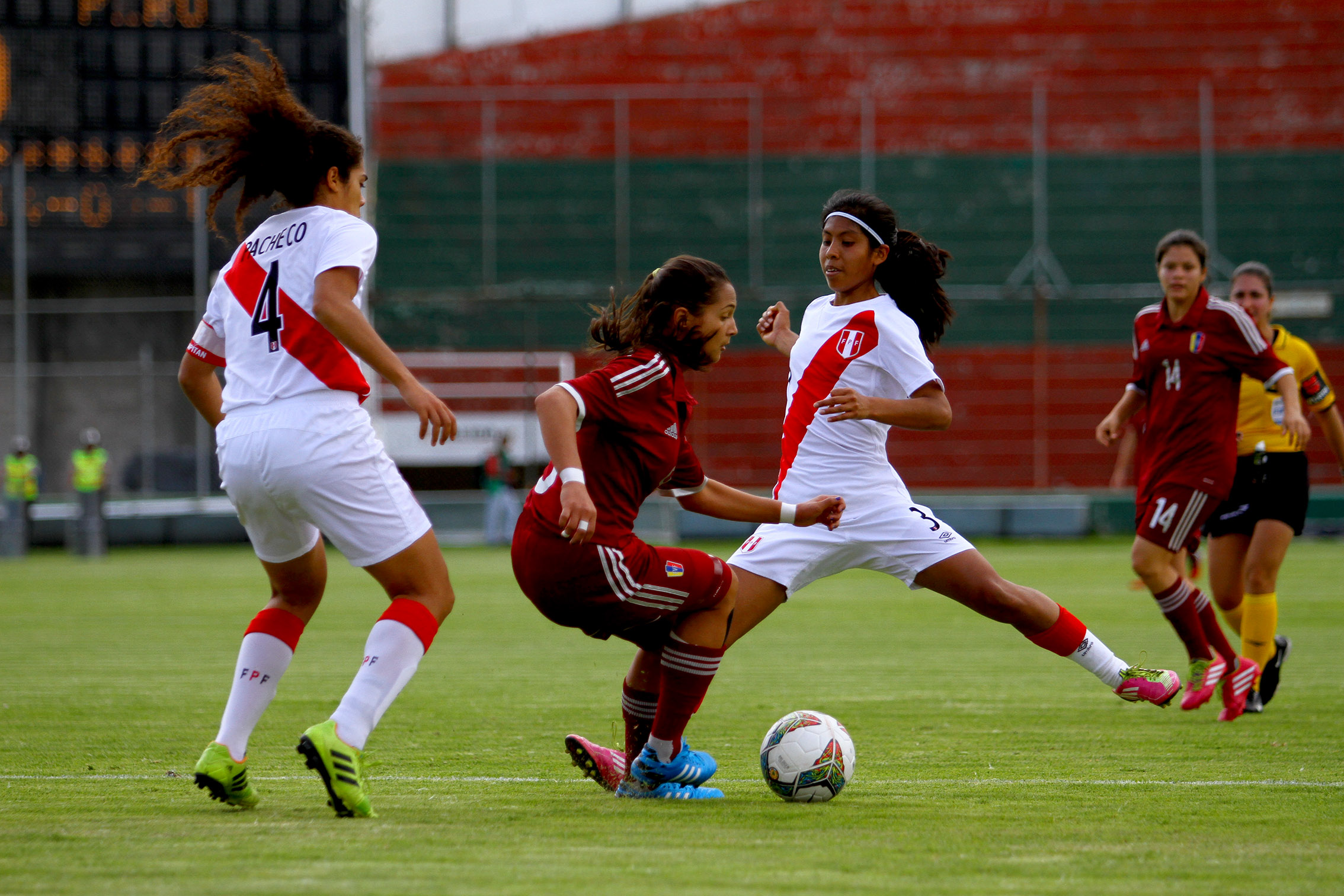
Castellanos playing against the Peru U-17 in 2014

In 2014, she was a member of the Venezuela national under-17 team who finished fourth in the 2014 FIFA U-17 Women's World Cup and runners-up in the 2014 Women's Youth Olympic football. She won the Golden Boot of the 2014 FIFA U-17 Women's World Cup with six goals, equalling her teammate Gabriela García and was also a goalscorer of the 2014 Women's Youth Olympic football with seven. She was also as a top scorer of the 2016 South American Under-17 Women's Football Championship with 12. Castellanos is the top goalscorer of the Venezuela U-17 women's team with 35. Castellanos is currently the all-time leading goalscorer of the FIFA U-17 Women's World Cup with 11.

Castellanos was called up to the Venezuela U-20 women's team in January 2018 for the 2018 South American Under-20 Women's Football Championship. She was the only player to score in the Group B matches with three, once against Uruguay, Bolivia and Chile. She was also the only player to score in the final stage, scoring once in a 3–1 defeat against Paraguay U-20 women's team.

=== Senior ===
In April 2018, Castellanos was part of the senior team in the 2018 Copa América Femenina. She scored on her debut against Ecuador on 5 April, and netted four times in an 8–0 win over Bolivia four days later. In 2021, at the age of 21, she was named captain of the team for the first time.

== Off the pitch ==
Castellanos started a foundation that encourages gender equality and helps provide football scholarship for South American girls.

She has worked as a studio analyst for NBC and Telemundo at the 2018 (men's) and 2019 (women's) FIFA World Cups, and in Spain. She is a fan of tattoos and as of 2022 has over 30. In Venezuela, she is known as Reina Deyna ("Queen Deyna"). She learned English while at Florida State University, becoming quickly bilingual.

In The Best FIFA Football Awards 2017, Castellanos was named to the three-woman shortlist for The Best FIFA Women's Player while still playing in college. Her nomination created some controversy. Megan Rapinoe was outspoken about this nomination, complaining that Castellanos was an unknown player and had not played professionally, nor in a major senior national team tournament at the time of her nomination.

== Career statistics ==
=== Club ===
As of match played 30 May 2026.

Appearances and goals by club, season and competition
Club	Season	League			National cup (Note: Includes Copa de la Reina, Women's FA Cup)		League cup (Note: Includes FA Women's League Cup, NWSL Challenge Cup)		Continental (Note: Includes UEFA Women's Champions League)		Other		Total	
Club	Season	Division	Apps	Goals	Apps	Goals	Apps	Goals	Apps	Goals	Apps	Goals	Apps	Goals
Atlético Madrid	2019–20	Primera División	5	0	1	0	—		0	0	1 (Note: appearances in Supercopa de España Femenina)	0	7	0
Atlético Madrid	2020–21	Primera División	27	13	2	0	—		4	1	2	1	35	15
Atlético Madrid	2021–22	Primera División	26	10	1	0	—		0	0	2	1	29	11
Atlético Madrid	Total		58	23	4	0	0	0	4	1	5	2	71	26
Manchester City	2022–23	Women's Super League	19	1	3	2	4	0	2	1	—		28	4
Manchester City	2023–24	Women's Super League	5	0	0	0	3	1	—		—		8	1
Manchester City	Total		24	1	3	2	7	1	2	1	0	0	36	5
Bay FC	2024	NWSL	20	2	—		—		—		1 (Note: appearances in NWSL playoffs)	0	21	2
Portland Thorns FC	2025	NWSL	23	2	—		—		—		—		23	2
Portland Thorns FC	2026	NWSL	4	0	—		—		—		—		4	0
Portland Thorns FC	Total		27	2	0	0	0	0	0	0	0	0	27	2
Career total			131	28	7	2	7	1	6	2	6	2	155	35

=== International ===
As of match played 25 September 2023

Appearances and goals by national team and year
National team	Year	Apps	Goals
Venezuela	2014	4	0
Venezuela	2015	0	0
Venezuela	2016	0	0
Venezuela	2017	1	0
Venezuela	2018	9	6
Venezuela	2019	1	0
Venezuela	2020	0	0
Venezuela	2021	5	4
Venezuela	2022	11	6
Venezuela	2023	7	6
Total		38	22

Scores and results list Venezuela's goal tally first, score column indicates score after each Castellanos goal.

List of international goals scored by Deyna Castellanos
No.	Date	Venue	Opponent	Score	Result	Competition
1	5 April 2018	Estadio Municipal Francisco Sánchez Rumoroso, Coquimbo, Chile	Ecuador	1–0	1–0	2018 Copa América Femenina
2	9 April 2018	Estadio Municipal Francisco Sánchez Rumoroso, Coquimbo, Chile	Bolivia	1–0	8–0	2018 Copa América Femenina
3	9 April 2018	Estadio Municipal Francisco Sánchez Rumoroso, Coquimbo, Chile	Bolivia	2–0	8–0	2018 Copa América Femenina
4	9 April 2018	Estadio Municipal Francisco Sánchez Rumoroso, Coquimbo, Chile	Bolivia	3–0	8–0	2018 Copa América Femenina
5	9 April 2018	Estadio Municipal Francisco Sánchez Rumoroso, Coquimbo, Chile	Bolivia	8–0	8–0	2018 Copa América Femenina
6	19 July 2018	Estadio Moderno Julio Torres, Barranquilla, Colombia	Jamaica	2–1	2–1	2018 Central American and Caribbean Games
7	23 October 2021	Estadio Monumental Banco Pichincha, Guayaquil, Ecuador	Ecuador	3–1	4–1	Friendly
8	23 October 2021	Estadio Monumental Banco Pichincha, Guayaquil, Ecuador	Ecuador	4–1	4–1	Friendly
9	26 October 2021	Estadio Monumental Banco Pichincha, Guayaquil, Ecuador	Ecuador	2–0	4–1	Friendly
10	26 October 2021	Estadio Monumental Banco Pichincha, Guayaquil, Ecuador	Ecuador	3–1	4–1	Friendly
11	9 April 2022	Estadio Olímpico Pascual Guerrero, Cali, Colombia	Colombia	1–0	2–2	Friendly
12	9 April 2022	Estadio Olímpico Pascual Guerrero, Cali, Colombia	Colombia	2–0	2–2	Friendly
13	9 July 2022	Estadio Centenario, Armenia, Colombia	Uruguay	1–0	1–0	2022 Copa América Femenina
14	15 July 2022	Estadio Centenario, Armenia, Colombia	Peru	1–0	2–0	2022 Copa América Femenina
15	24 July 2022	Estadio Centenario, Armenia, Colombia	Chile	1–1	1–1 (2–4 p)	2022 Copa América Femenina
16	14 November 2022	Estadio Municipal Los Arcos, Orihuela, Spain	Scotland	1–2	1–2	Friendly
17	29 June 2023	Estadio Las Delicias, Santa Tecla, El Salvador	Costa Rica	3–0	4–0	2023 Central American and Caribbean Games
18	1 July 2023	Estadio Las Delicias, Santa Tecla, El Salvador	Haiti	1–1	4–1	2023 Central American and Caribbean Games
19	1 July 2023	Estadio Las Delicias, Santa Tecla, El Salvador	Haiti	4–1	4–1	2023 Central American and Caribbean Games
20	3 July 2023	Estadio Las Delicias, Santa Tecla, El Salvador	Guatemala	2–0	2–0	2023 Central American and Caribbean Games
21	5 July 2023	Estadio Las Delicias, Santa Tecla, El Salvador	El Salvador	2–0	2–1	2023 Central American and Caribbean Games
22	26 September 2023	Estadio Olímpico de la UCV, Caracas, Venezuela	Uruguay	1–0	1–0	Friendly
23	31 May 2025	Marbella Football Center, San Pedro Alcántara, Spain	New Zealand	1–0	3–1	Friendly
24	2 December 2025	Estadio Metropolitano de Cabudare, Cabudare, Venezuela	Peru	1–0	6–0	2025–26 CONMEBOL Women's Nations League
25	18 April 2026	Estadio Metropolitano de Cabudare, Cabudare, Venezuela	Bolivia	7–0	8–0	2025–26 CONMEBOL Women's Nations League
26	9 June 2026	Estadio Centenario, Montevideo, Uruguay	Uruguay	1–1	1–1	2025–26 CONMEBOL Women's Nations League

== Honors ==
=== Team ===
Florida State Seminoles

- NCAA Division I Women's Soccer Championship: 2018

Atlético Madrid

- Supercopa de España Femenina: 2020–21

=== Personal ===
- The Best FIFA Women's Player nomination: 2017
