= Melany Villeda =

Mexican footballer (born 2001)

Personal information
- Full name: Melany Aylín Villeda Medina
- Date of birth: 25 October 2001 (age 25)
- Place of birth: Iztacalco, Mexico City, Mexico
- Height: 1.65 m (5 ft 5 in)
- Position: Goalkeeper

Team information
- Current team: Cruz Azul
- Number: 1

Senior career*
Years	Team	Apps	(Gls)
2018–2025	UNAM	154	(0)
2025–	Cruz Azul	0	(0)

International career^{‡}
2018	Mexico U20	1	(0)
2021–	Mexico	1	(0)
Medal record
Women's football
Representing Mexico
Central American and Caribbean Games
Gold medal – first place	2023 San Salvador
- * Club domestic league appearances and goals as of 11 March 2021 ‡ National team caps and goals as of 23 February 2021

Melany Aylín Villeda Medina (born 25 October 2001) is a Mexican footballer who plays as a goalkeeper for Liga Femenil club Cruz Azul and the Mexico women's national team.

== Early life ==
Villeda was born in Iztacalco, Mexico City.

== Club career ==
Villeda has played for UNAM in Mexico.

== International career ==
Villeda was a non-playing squad member for the Mexico women's national under-17 football team at the 2018 FIFA U-17 Women's World Cup.

Villeda made her debut for the senior Mexico women's national team on 23 February 2021, as a 67th-minute substitution in a 0–0 friendly home draw against Costa Rica at Centro de Alto Rendimiento in Mexico City.
