= Andrea Amaya =

Salvadoran footballer (born 2003)

Nicolle Amaya
Personal information
- Full name: Andrea Nicolle Amaya Villalta
- Date of birth: 16 February 2003 (age 23)
- Place of birth: San Salvador, El Salvador
- Height: 1.60 m (5 ft 3 in)
- Positions: Defender; midfielder

Team information
- Current team: Belgrano

Senior career*
Years	Team	Apps	(Gls)
- Alianza
- Chalatenango
2022	Atlas	5	(0)
2024–2025	Ñañas	0	(0)
2025	Universidad Católica	0	(0)
2025–2026	Inter FA	0	(0)
2026	Belgrano	0	(0)

International career^{‡}
2020–	El Salvador U20	4	(0)
2021–	El Salvador	1	(0)
Medal record
Women's football
Representing El Salvador
Central American and Caribbean Games
Bronze medal – third place	2023 San Salvador
- * Club domestic league appearances and goals ‡ National team caps and goals as of 11 April 2021.

Andrea Nicolle Amaya Villalta (born 16 February 2003) is a Salvadoran footballer who plays as a defender for Campeonato de Fútbol Femenino club Belgrano and the El Salvador national team.

== Club career ==
Amaya has played for Alianza FC and AD Chalatenango in El Salvador.

On 10 April 2024, Amaya joined Ecuadorian Superliga Femenina side Ñañas.

== International career ==
Amaya represented El Salvador at the 2020 CONCACAF Women's U-20 Championship. She made her senior debut on 8 April 2021.

== See also ==
- List of El Salvador women's international footballers
