= Daniela Monroy =

Mexican footballer (born 2002)

Personal information
- Full name: Daniela Janet Monroy Cortez
- Date of birth: 21 September 2002 (age 24)
- Place of birth: Mexico City, Mexico
- Height: 1.62 m (5 ft 4 in)
- Position: Left-back

Team information
- Current team: Monterrey
- Number: 2

Senior career*
Years	Team	Apps	(Gls)
2017–2023	Cruz Azul	181	(10)
2024–	Monterrey	58	(2)

International career^{‡}
2022	Mexico U-20		
2022–	Mexico	2	(0)
- * Club domestic league appearances and goals as of 4 June 2023 ‡ National team caps and goals as of 12 March 2022

Daniela Janet Monroy Cortez (born 21 September 2002) is a Mexican professional footballer who plays as a left-back for Liga MX Femenil club Monterrey and the Mexico women's national team.

== Career ==
=== Cruz Azul (2017–2023) ===
In 2017, she started her career in Cruz Azul, becoming a benchmark and one of the most outstanding players in the history of the team.

== International career ==
Monroy was part of the Mexico's team that won the gold medal in the 2023 Central American and Caribbean Games. Monroy played two of Mexico's five matches, and no scoring goals.

== Career statistics ==
=== Club ===
As of match played 4 June 2023

Appearances and goals by club, season and competition
Club	Season	League			Total	
Club	Season	Division	Apps	Goals	Apps	Goals
Cruz Azul	2017–18	Liga MX Femenil	28	0	28	0
Cruz Azul	2018–19	Liga MX Femenil	30	3	30	3
Cruz Azul	2019–20	Liga MX Femenil	22	2	22	2
Cruz Azul	2020–21	Liga MX Femenil	31	1	31	1
Cruz Azul	2021–22	Liga MX Femenil	25	0	25	0
Cruz Azul	2022–23	Liga MX Femenil	24	3	24	3
Cruz Azul	2023–24	Liga MX Femenil	7	0	7	0
Cruz Azul	Total		167	9	167	9
Career total			167	9	167	9
