= Greta Espinoza =

Mexican footballer (born 1995)

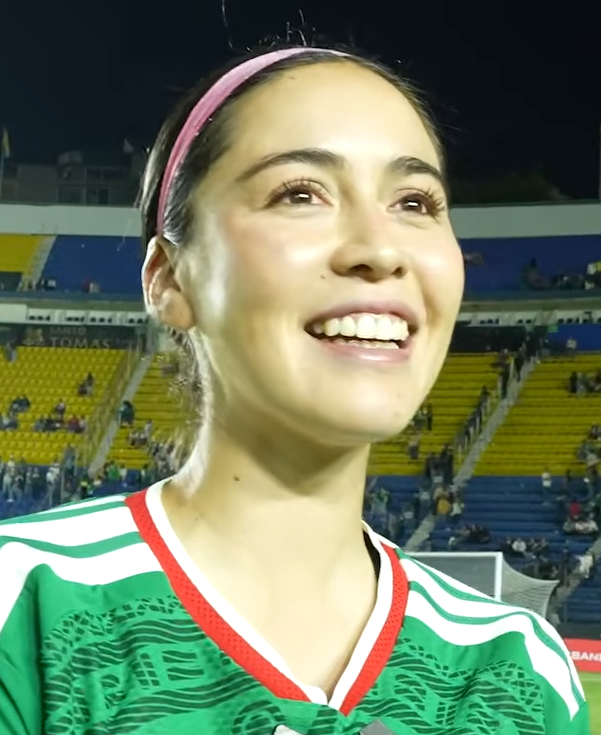
- Espinoza with Mexico in 2026

Personal information
- Full name: Greta Alejandra Espinoza Casas
- Date of birth: 5 June 1995 (age 31)
- Place of birth: Tijuana, Mexico
- Height: 1.68 m (5 ft 6 in)
- Position: Centre-back

Team information
- Current team: UANL
- Number: 4

College career
Years	Team	Apps	(Gls)
2013–2014	Arizona Western Matadors	16	(8)
2015–2017	Oregon State Beavers	39	(1)

Senior career*
Years	Team	Apps	(Gls)
- Arizona Strikers
2017–2018	Levante	15	(0)
2018–	UANL	263	(24)

International career^{‡}
2012	Mexico U17		
2014	Mexico U20		
2014–	Mexico	57	(5)
Medal record
Women's football
Representing Mexico
Pan American Games
Gold medal – first place	2023 Santiago	Team
Central American and Caribbean Games
Gold medal – first place	2023 San Salvador
- * Club domestic league appearances and goals as of 2 March 2025 ‡ National team caps and goals as of 2 March 2025

Greta Alejandra Espinoza Casas (born 5 June 1995) is a Mexican footballer who plays as a defender for Liga MX Femenil club Tigres UANL and the Mexico national team.

== International career ==
Espinoza was selected to represent Mexico at the 2023 Pan American Games held in Santiago, Chile, where the Mexican squad went undefeated to win the gold medal for the first time in their history at the Pan American Games, defeating Chile 1–0.

== Honors and awards ==
UANL

- Liga MX Femenil: Clausura 2018, Clausura 2019, Guard1anes 2020, Guard1anes 2021, Apertura 2022, Apertura 2023, Apertura 2025
- Campeón de Campeones: 2021, 2023

Mexico

- Pan American Games: 2023, gold medal

== International goals ==
No.	Date	Venue	Opponent	Score	Result	Competition
1.	29 June 2023	Estadio Las Delicias, Santa Tecla, El Salvador	Puerto Rico	4–0	4–0	2023 Central American and Caribbean Games
2.	3 July 2023	Estadio Las Delicias, Santa Tecla, El Salvador	Jamaica	1–0	7–3	2023 Central American and Caribbean Games
3.	5 July 2023	Estadio Las Delicias, Santa Tecla, El Salvador	Guatemala	4–0	6–0	2023 Central American and Caribbean Games
4.	26 September 2023	Estadio Hidalgo, Pachuca, Mexico	Trinidad and Tobago	2–0	6–0	2024 CONCACAF W Gold Cup qualification
5.	7 March 2026	Estadio Ciudad de los Deportes, Mexico City, Mexico	Brazil	1–0	1–0	Friendly
