= Priscila Ortiz =

Salvadoran footballer (born 1996)

Personal information
- Full name: Priscila Jeanmillette Ortiz Arana
- Date of birth: 7 June 1996 (age 30)
- Place of birth: El Salvador
- Position: Defender

Team information
- Current team: Alianza

Senior career*
Years	Team	Apps	(Gls)
- Alianza

International career^{‡}
2019–	El Salvador	2	(0)
Medal record
Women's football
Representing El Salvador
Central American and Caribbean Games
Bronze medal – third place	2023 San Salvador
- * Club domestic league appearances and goals ‡ National team caps and goals as of 8 October 2019.

Priscila Jeanmillette Ortiz Arana (born 7 June 1996) is a Salvadoran footballer who plays as a defender for Alianza FC and the El Salvador women's national team.

== Club career ==
Ortiz has played for Alianza FC in El Salvador.

== International career ==
Ortiz capped for El Salvador at senior level during the 2020 CONCACAF Women's Olympic Qualifying Championship qualification.

== See also ==
- List of El Salvador women's international footballers
