= Nayluisa Cáceres =

Venezuelan footballer (born 1999)

Personal information
- Full name: Nayluisa Jhaylenny Cáceres Acevedo
- Date of birth: 18 November 1999 (age 26)
- Place of birth: Socopó, Barinas, Venezuela
- Height: 1.72 m (5 ft 8 in)
- Position: Goalkeeper

Team information
- Current team: Tenerife

Senior career*
Years	Team	Apps	(Gls)
2016	Zamora		
2016–2018	Unión Española		
2018–2023	Granadilla B	91	(0)
2020–2023	Granadilla	9	(0)
2023–2024	Levante Badalona	29	(0)
2024	Alhama	0	(0)
2025–	Tenerife	5	(0)

International career^{‡}
2014–2016	Venezuela U17	7	(0)
2021–	Venezuela	33	(0)
Medal record
Women's football
Representing Venezuela
Central American and Caribbean Games
Silver medal – second place	2023 San Salvador
- * Club domestic league appearances and goals as of 30 April 2023 ‡ National team caps and goals as of 8 April 2021.

Nayluisa Jhaylenny Cáceres Acevedo (born 18 November 1999) is a Venezuelan professional footballer who plays as a goalkeeper for Liga F club Tenerife and the Venezuela women's national team.

== Early life ==
Cáceres was born in Socopó, Barinas.

== Club career ==
Cáceres has played for Zamora FC in Venezuela, for Unión Española de Guayaquil in Ecuador and for UD Granadilla Tenerife in Spain.

== International career ==
Cáceres made her senior debut for Venezuela on 8 April 2021.
