= Nairelis Gutiérrez =

Venezuelan footballer (born 1995)

Personal information
- Full name: Nairelis Nazareth Gutiérrez
- Date of birth: 2 July 1995 (age 31)
- Place of birth: San Juan, Venezuela
- Height: 1.66 m (5 ft 5 in)
- Position: Midfielder

Team information
- Current team: Grêmio
- Number: 2

Senior career*
Years	Team	Apps	(Gls)
–2017	Estudiantes de Guárico		
2018	Unión Magdalena		
2018–2019	FFC Vorderland	18	(2)
2019	Libertad/Limpeño		
2020–2021	Junior Barranquilla		
2024–	Grêmio	1	(0)

International career^{‡}
2018–	Venezuela	9	(0)
Medal record
Women's football
Representing Venezuela
Central American and Caribbean Games
Silver medal – second place	2023 San Salvador
- * Club domestic league appearances and goals as of 28 March 2024 ‡ National team caps and goals as of 30 July 2018

Nairelis Nazareth Gutiérrez (born 2 July 1995) is a Venezuelan professional footballer who plays as a midfielder for Campeonato Brasileiro Série A1 club Grêmio and the Venezuela women's national team.

== International career ==
Gutiérrez played for Venezuela at senior level in the 2018 Copa América Femenina and the 2018 Central American and Caribbean Games.
