= Paola Villamizar =

Venezuelan footballer (born 1994)

Personal information
- Full name: Paola del Carmen Villamizar Ochoa
- Date of birth: 30 June 1994 (age 32)
- Place of birth: Aragua, Venezuela
- Height: 1.70 m (5 ft 7 in)
- Position: Attacking midfielder

Senior career*
Years	Team	Apps	(Gls)
2010–2011	Casa D'Italia FC		
2012–2013	Caracas FC		
2013–2017	Estudiantes de Guárico		
2018	Audax	13	(1)
2019	Santos	9	(2)
2020–2021	Santiago Morning		
2021–2026	Tijuana	63	(11)

International career
2010	Venezuela U17	2	(0)
2014	Venezuela U20	2+	(2)
2018–2023	Venezuela	9	(2)
Medal record
Women's football
Representing Venezuela
Central American and Caribbean Games
Silver medal – second place	2023 San Salvador
- * Club domestic league appearances and goals as of 10 February 2022

Paola del Carmen Villamizar Ochoa (born 30 June 1994) is a Venezuelan professional footballer who plays as a midfielder for Mexican Liga MX Femenil side Club Tijuana and the Venezuela women's national team.

== International career ==
Villamizar represented Venezuela at the 2014 South American U-20 Women's Championship. At senior level, she made her debut on 5 April 2018, in a Copa América Femenina match against Ecuador.
