= Kiana Palacios =

Mexican footballer (born 1996)

- Palacios with the Utah Royals in 2026

Personal information
- Full name: Kiana Angélica Palacios Hernández
- Date of birth: 1 October 1996 (age 30)
- Place of birth: Orange, California, United States
- Height: 1.67 m (5 ft 6 in)
- Position: Forward

Team information
- Current team: Utah Royals
- Number: 21

College career
Years	Team	Apps	(Gls)
2014–2017	UC Irvine Anteaters	67	(24)

Senior career*
Years	Team	Apps	(Gls)
2018	LA Galaxy OC	5	(3)
2018–2021	Real Sociedad	68	(13)
2021–2026	América	162	(83)
2026–	Utah Royals	28	(4)

International career^{‡}
2015–2016	Mexico U-20	8	(5)
2017–	Mexico	51	(13)
Medal record
Women's football
Representing Mexico
Pan American Games
Gold medal – first place	2023 Santiago	Team
Central American and Caribbean Games
Gold medal – first place	2023 San Salvador
- * Club domestic league appearances and goals as of 04:23, 10 November 2026 (UTC) ‡ National team caps and goals as of 13 July 2025

Kiana Angélica Palacios Hernández (born 1 October 1996) is a professional footballer who plays as a forward for the Utah Royals of the National Women's Soccer League (NWSL). Born and raised in the United States to Mexican parents, she plays for the Mexico national team. Palacios played college soccer for the UC Irvine Anteaters. She began her professional career with Real Sociedad, helping win the Copa de la Reina in her debut season in 2019. After three years at the Spanish club, she joined Liga MX Femenil side Club América in 2021, becoming the all-time leading scorer in club history.

== College career ==
Palacios played college soccer for the UC Irvine Anteaters, converting from defensive midfielder to forward and essentially playing where the Anteaters needed her to be. She adjusted well and became the fourth-leading scorer all-time for UC Irvine with 24 goals. In her junior season, Palacios was at a point leading the NCAA in goals scored and total team points before leaving for international duty with the Mexico U-20 team in 2016, two weeks before the NCAA regular season ended.

In her senior season, due to team injuries, Palacios was placed into the Central/Attacking Midfield position where she guided the Anteaters to the Big West regular season title; the Anteaters would eventually be defeated in the Big West semifinals.

== Club career ==
=== LA Galaxy OC ===
in 2017, Palacios registered in the 2018 NWSL Draft and was selected in the fourth round by Sky Blue FC, but she was not signed.

Palacios joined the LA Galaxy OC in May 2018, a now defunct women's soccer team that competed in the United Women's Soccer league, and that was created to help college players and recent graduates develop as professionals. Palacios scored three goals in five matches during her short stay with the team.

=== Real Sociedad ===
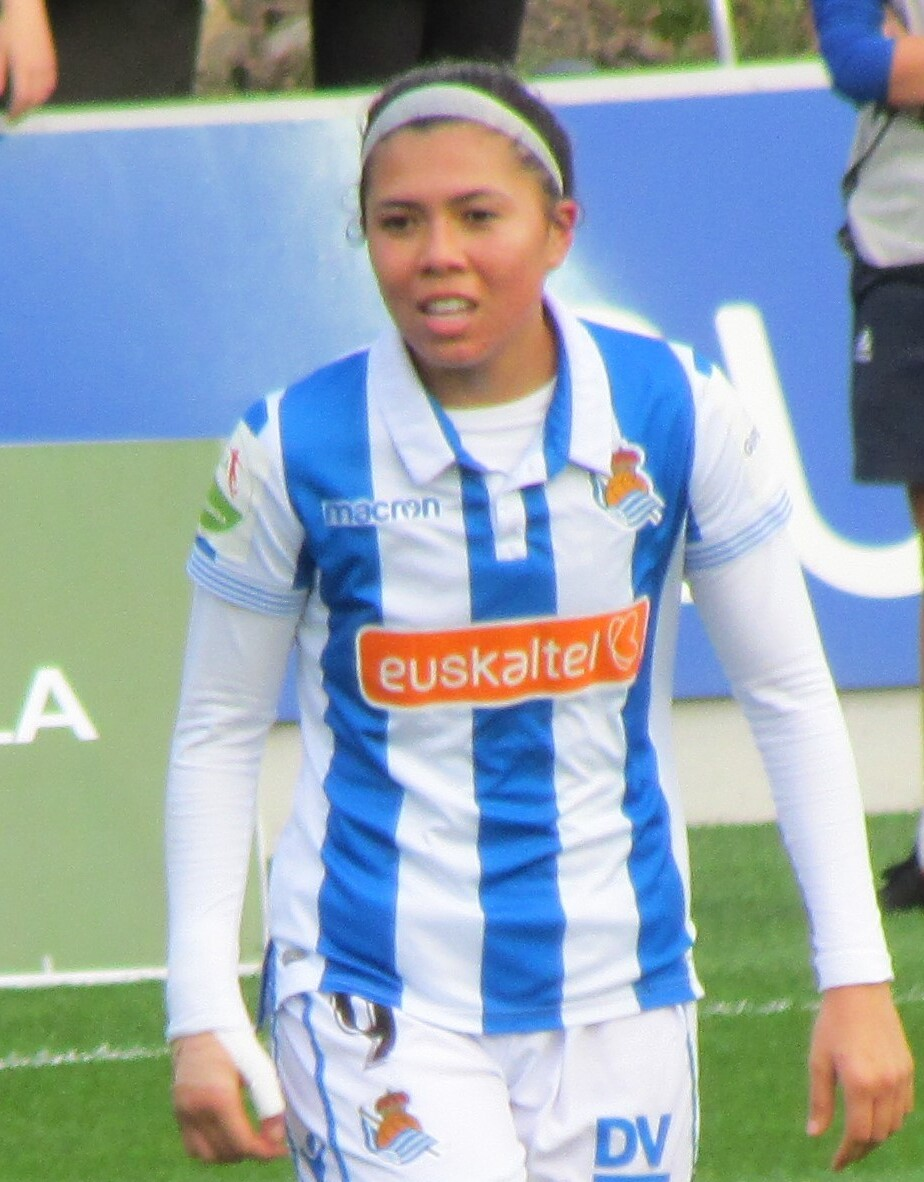
Palacios with Real Sociedad in 2018

On 13 July 2018, Spain's Primera División club Real Sociedad announced that Palacios had signed a one-year contract with the club. Palacios made her debut with Real Sociedad on 16 September 2018 in a match against Málaga, coming into the game as a substitute. Palacios made 25 league appearances and scored six goals during her first season with Real Sociedad.

Palacios was also key player for Real Sociedad to win the 2018–19 Copa de la Reina, the club first Copa de la Reina title in history, by scoring four goals including a goal and an assist in the final against Atlético Madrid which ended in 2–1 victory for Real Sociedad. In total, Palacios made 68 league appearances and scored 13 goals during her three-year stint with Real Sociedad.

=== Club América ===
On 1 July 2021, Palacios was announced by Liga MX Femenil side Club América as their new signing. she made her debut with América in match against Santos for matchday 1 of the Apertura 2021 that ended in 2–1 victory in favour of América, with Palacios scoring one goal for América during the match. However, during her first season with América, Palacios struggled with injuries and poor fitness which led her to make only 22 appearances mainly as a sub and score three goals.

During the Apertura 2022 tournament, Palacios made a return to form and became a key player in the attack for América to return to the league final after four years, as she scored 15 goals in 22 matches. Palacios once again played a key factor during América's run to the championship of the Clausura 2023 tournament, scoring 15 goals in 18 games.

On 19 February 2026, América announced that Palacios was departing after nearly five years at the club. Palacios was América's top goal scorer in all competitions and one of the players with the most appearances with the team.

=== Utah Royals ===
On 3 March 2026, National Women's Soccer League (NWSL) club Utah Royals announced that they had acquired Palacios for an undisclosed transfer fee. On 23 May, she scored her first NWSL goal in a 2–1 win over expansion team Denver Summit. She helped Utah make the playoffs for the first time and scored the first playoff goal in club history in a 1–0 win over the San Diego Wave in the quarterfinals.

== International career ==
Palacios represented Mexico at the 2015 CONCACAF Women's U-20 Championship and the 2016 FIFA U-20 Women's World Cup. She made her senior debut on 4 February 2017 in a friendly match against Canada.

Palacios made her first senior team start on 8 July 2017, against Sweden and scored her first senior team goal on 8 April 2018, against the United States in her fifth recorded cap.

Palacios was selected to represent Mexico at the 2023 Pan American Games held in Santiago, Chile, where the Mexican squad went undefeated to win the gold medal for the first time in their history at the Pan American Games, defeating Chile 1–0.

== Career statistics ==
=== Club ===
As of match played 21 February 2026

Club	Season	League			Cup (Note: Includes Copa de la Reina and Campeón de Campeonas)		League Cup (Note: Includes NWSL x Liga MX Femenil Summer Cup)		Continental (Note: Includes CONCACAF W Champions Cup)		Total	
Club	Season	Division	Apps	Goals	Apps	Goals	Apps	Goals	Apps	Goals	Apps	Goals
LA Galaxy OC	2018	United Women's Soccer	5	3	—		—		—		5	3
LA Galaxy OC	Total		5	3	—		—		—		5	3
Real Sociedad	2018–19	Primera Division	25	6	4	4	—		—		29	10
Real Sociedad	2019–20	Primera Division	16	4	1	0	—		—		17	4
Real Sociedad	2020–21	Primera Division	27	3	1	0	—		—		28	3
Real Sociedad	Total		68	13	6	4	—		—		74	17
Club América	2021–22	Liga MX Femenil	22	3	—		—		—		22	3
Club América	2022–23	Liga MX Femenil	40	30	—		—		—		40	30
Club América	2023–24	Liga MX Femenil	40	18	1	0	—		—		41	18
Club América	2024–25	Liga MX Femenil	30	18	—		3	2	6	3		
Club América	2025–26	Liga MX Femenil	30	14	—		—		4	3		
Club América	Total		162	83	1	0	3	2	10	6	176	91
Career total			235	99	7	4	3	2	10	6	255	111

=== International goals ===
No.	Date	Venue	Opponent	Score	Result	Competition
1.	8 April 2018	BBVA Stadium, Houston, United States	United States	2–1	2–6	Friendly
2.	28 July 2019	Estadio Universidad San Marcos, Lima, Peru	Jamaica	1–0	2–0	2019 Pan American Games
3.	1 February 2020	H-E-B Park, Edinburg, United States	Saint Kitts and Nevis	1–0	6–0	2020 CONCACAF Women's Olympic Qualifying Championship
4.	15 February 2023	Estadio León, León, Mexico	Nigeria	1–0	1–0	2023 Women's Revelations Cup
5.	18 February 2023	Estadio León, León, Mexico	Costa Rica	1–0	1–1	2023 Women's Revelations Cup
6.	29 June 2023	Estadio Las Delicias, Santa Tecla, El Salvador	Puerto Rico	4–0	4–0	2023 Central American and Caribbean Games
7.	3 July 2023	Estadio Las Delicias, Santa Tecla, El Salvador	Jamaica	3–0	7–3	2023 Central American and Caribbean Games
8.	3 July 2023	Estadio Las Delicias, Santa Tecla, El Salvador	Jamaica	4–1	7–3	2023 Central American and Caribbean Games
9.	5 July 2023	Estadio Las Delicias, Santa Tecla, El Salvador	Guatemala	2–0	6–0	2023 Central American and Caribbean Games
10.	22 October 2023	Estadio Elias Figueroa Brander, Viña del Mar, Chile	Jamaica	3–0	7–0	2023 Pan American Games
11.	1 December 2023	Juan Ramón Loubriel Stadium, Bayamón, Puerto Rico	Puerto Rico	2–0	3–0	2024 CONCACAF W Gold Cup qualification
12.	1 December 2023	Juan Ramón Loubriel Stadium, Bayamón, Puerto Rico	Puerto Rico	3–0	3–0	2024 CONCACAF W Gold Cup qualification
13.	26 October 2024	Estadio Agustín "Coruco" Díaz, Zacatepec, Mexico	Venezuela	1–0	3–0	Friendly
14.	10 April 2026	Estadio Carlos Vega Villalba, Zacatecas, Mexico	U.S. Virgin Islands	9–0	9–0	2026 CONCACAF W Championship qualification
15.	18 April 2026	Estadio Nemesio Díez, Toluca, Mexico	Puerto Rico	4–0	6–0	2026 CONCACAF W Championship qualification

== Honours ==
Real Sociedad

- Copa de la Reina: 2018–19

Club América

- Liga MX Femenil: Clausura 2023

Mexico

- Pan American Games: 2023, gold medal
