= Centro Caribe Sports =

Regional sports federation

- Formation: 1960
- Type: Continental sports organization
- Official language: English, Spanish, French
- President: Luis Mejía Oviedo
- Website: centrocaribesports.org

Centro Caribe Sports, formerly the Central American and Caribbean Sports Organization (CACSO), is a regional sports federation which oversees the Central American and Caribbean Games. It is also known by its former Spanish name, Organización Deportiva Centroamericana y del Caribe (ODECABE).

Its member countries come from nations in Central America and the Caribbean region. It is affiliated to the Pan American Sports Organization.

== Members ==
=== Full members ===
Nation	Code	National Olympic Committee
Antigua and Barbuda	ANT	The Antigua and Barbuda Olympic Association
Aruba	ARU	Aruban Olympic Committee
Bahamas	BAH	Bahamas Olympic Association
Barbados	BAR	Barbados Olympic Association
Bermuda	BER	Bermuda Olympic Association
Belize	BIZ	Belize Olympic and Commonwealth Games Association
Cayman Islands	CAY	Cayman Islands Olympic Committee
Colombia	COL	Colombian Olympic Committee
Costa Rica	CRC	Costa Rican Olympic Committee
Cuba	CUB	Cuban Olympic Committee
Dominica	DMA	Dominica Olympic Committee
Dominican Republic	DOM	Dominican Republic Olympic Committee
El Salvador	ESA	El Salvador Olympic Committee
Grenada	GRN	Grenada Olympic Committee
Guatemala	GUA	Guatemalan Olympic Committee
Guyana	GUY	Guyana Olympic Association
Haiti	HAI	Haitian Olympic Committee
Honduras	HON	Honduran Olympic Committee
U.S. Virgin Islands	ISV	Virgin Islands Olympic Committee
British Virgin Islands	IVB	British Virgin Islands Olympic Committee
Jamaica	JAM	Jamaica Olympic Association
Saint Lucia	LCA	Saint Lucia Olympic Committee
Mexico	MEX	Mexican Olympic Committee
Nicaragua	NCA	Nicaraguan Olympic Committee
Panama	PAN	Panama Olympic Committee
Puerto Rico	PUR	Puerto Rico Olympic Committee
Saint Kitts and Nevis	SKN	St. Kitts and Nevis Olympic Committee
Suriname	SUR	Suriname Olympic Committee
Trinidad and Tobago	TTO	Trinidad and Tobago Olympic Committee
Venezuela	VEN	Venezuelan Olympic Committee
St. Vincent and the Grenadines	VIN	St. Vincent and the Grenadines National Olympic Committee

=== Associate Members ===
Nation	Code	Type
French Guiana	GUF	Associate member
Martinique	MTQ	Associate member
Guadeloupe	GLP	Associate member
Sint Maarten	SXM	Associate member
Turks and Caicos Islands	TCA	Associate member
Curaçao	CUW	Associate member
Bonaire	BOE	
Montserrat	MSR	Non-member

== Recent history ==
Due to the suspension of the Guatemalan Olympic Committee in 2022, Guatemala competed at the 2023 Central American and Caribbean Games under the Centro Caribe Sports flag.
