= Christina Burkenroad =

Mexican footballer (born 1993)

Personal information
- Full name: Christina Marie Burkenroad Sandoval
- Birth name: Christina Marie Burkenroad
- Date of birth: 12 July 1993 (age 33)
- Place of birth: La Jolla, California, United States
- Height: 1.78 m (5 ft 10 in)
- Position: Forward

Youth career
- 2009–2012: Mission Bay High School
- 2011–2012: Nomads Soccer Club

College career
Years	Team	Apps	(Gls)
2012–2015	Cal State Fullerton Titans	61	(18)

Senior career*
Years	Team	Apps	(Gls)
2016–2017	Orlando Pride	8	(0)
2017	IK Grand Bodø	11	(2)
2018–2020	Sparta Prague	42	(46)
2020–2026	Monterrey	247	(118)

International career^{‡}
2023–2025	Mexico	14	(6)
Medal record
Women's football
Representing Mexico
Central American and Caribbean Games
Gold medal – first place	2023 San Salvador
- * Club domestic league appearances and goals as of 15 August 2026 ‡ National team caps and goals as of 30 May 2025

Christina Marie Burkenroad Sandoval (born 12 July 1993) is a former professional footballer who last played as a forward for Liga MX Femenil club CF Monterrey. In January 2016, she was drafted by the Orlando Pride in the National Women's Soccer League. Born and raised in the United States to an American father and a Mexican mother, she plays for the Mexico women's national team.

== Early life and college career ==
Burkenroad was born in La Jolla, San Diego, to William Burkenroad and Elizabeth Sandoval Noriega. She was four years old when her mother died from ALS. Her father suffered from depression, her brothers moved away, and Burkenroad and her father moved frequently during her childhood. She lived homeless for a few weeks during her junior year at Mission Bay High School before moving in with the family of a teammate.

Until Mission Bay High School, she had only played soccer with boys clubs and Nomads Soccer Club. She excelled in many sports, set a school record for girls' soccer with 93 career goals, and won a scholarship to California State University, Fullerton, Titans.

== Club career ==
She signed with the Orlando Pride on 18 May 2016, and appeared in 8 matches before being waived on 21 June 2017, to make room for returning forward Alex Morgan. She signed with IK Grand Bodø in Norway's Toppserien in June 2017.

On 6 February 2018, Burkenroad joined Czech side Sparta Prague. She helped Sparta win their first Czech Women's First League title in five years and their ninth Czech Women's Cup. In the 2018–19 season Sparta won both competitions again. Due to the COVID-19 pandemic the 2019–20 Czech Women's First League was canceled and Burkenroad decided to not extend her contract.

On 6 July 2020, Burkenroad joined Liga MX Femenil club CF Monterrey. Rayadas won the 2021 Apertura, with Burkenroad playing in the first leg of the final but suffering a concussion. In the 2022 Apertura, she scored 16 goals, second-most in the league behind Mia Fishel's 17.

== Personal life ==
Burkenroad announced her engagement to footballer Opal Curless on June 21, 2026.

== Career statistics ==
=== International goals ===
No.	Date	Venue	Opponent	Score	Result	Competition
1.	1 July 2023	Estadio Las Delicias, Santa Tecla, El Salvador	El Salvador	2–0	3–2	2023 Central American and Caribbean Games
2.	3 July 2023	Estadio Las Delicias, Santa Tecla, El Salvador	Jamaica	6–2	7–3	2023 Central American and Caribbean Games
3.	5 July 2023	Estadio Las Delicias, Santa Tecla, El Salvador	Guatemala	1–0	6–0	2023 Central American and Caribbean Games
4.	29 October 2024	Estadio Nemesio Diez, Toluca, Mexico	Thailand	1–0	4–0	Friendly
5.	30 November 2024	Estadio Andrés Quintana Roo, Cancún, Mexico	Costa Rica	1–0	4–1	Friendly
6.	5 April 2025	CPKC Stadium, Kansas City, United States	Jamaica	2–0	3–0	Friendly
