= Karen Reyes (footballer) =

Salvadoran footballer (born 1998)

Personal information
- Full name: Karen Jissel Reyes Hernández
- Birth name: Karen Jissel Reyes
- Date of birth: 12 February 1998 (age 28)
- Place of birth: Reston, Virginia, U.S.
- Height: 1.67 m (5 ft 6 in)
- Position: Forward

Team information
- Current team: Volos F.C.

Youth career
- South Lakes Seahawks

College career
Years	Team	Apps	(Gls)
2016–2019	Marymount Saints	69	(31)

Senior career*
Years	Team	Apps	(Gls)
2021–2022	Åland United	19	(2)
2023–2024	Necaxa	30	(3)
2025	Club Ñañas		
2025–	Volos	17	(2)

International career^{‡}
2021–	El Salvador	5	(2)
Medal record
Women's football
Representing El Salvador
Central American and Caribbean Games
Bronze medal – third place	2023 San Salvador
- * Club domestic league appearances and goals as of 4 June 2026. ‡ National team caps and goals as of 19 November 2021.

Karen Jissel Reyes Hernández (born 12 February 1998) is a footballer who plays as a forward for Greek club Volos F.C.. Born in the United States, she caps for the El Salvador women's national team.

== Early life ==
Reyes was born and raised in Reston, Virginia to Salvadoran parents, Fausto Reyes and Norma Hernández, both from Anamorós.

== High school and college career ==
Reyes has attended the South Lakes High School in her hometown and the Marymount University in Arlington County, Virginia.

== Club career ==
Reyes has played for Åland United in Finland.

== International career ==
Reyes made her senior debut for El Salvador on 19 November 2021.

== See also ==
- List of El Salvador women's international footballers
