= Football at the 2023 Central American and Caribbean Games – Women's tournament =

2023 women's football tournament

2023 Central American and Caribbean Games – Women's Football Tournament
Tournament details
- Host country: El Salvador
- Dates: 29 June – 7 July
- Teams: 8 (from 2 confederations)
- Venue: 1 (in 1 host city)

Final positions
- Champions: Mexico (3rd title)
- Runners-up: Venezuela
- Third place: El Salvador
- Fourth place: Centro Caribe Sports

Tournament statistics
- Matches played: 16
- Goals scored: 67 (4.19 per match)
- Top scorer(s): (Venezuela) Deyna Castellanos (5 goals)

The Women's football tournament at the 2023 Central American and Caribbean Games was held in Santa Tecla, El Salvador from 25 June to 7 July.

== Participating teams ==
Eight teams from two confederations participated in the tournament. The eight teams were:

| Confederation | Teams qualified | No. teams |
|---|---|---|
| Centro Caribe Sports (Note: Due to the suspension of the Guatemalan Olympic Committee in 2022, Guatemala is competing at the 2023 Central American and Caribbean Games under the Centro Caribe Sports flag.) | | 1 |
| CONCACAF | Costa Rica; El Salvador (hosts); Haiti; Jamaica; Mexico; Puerto Rico | 6 |
| CONMEBOL | ~~Colombia~~ (withdrew); Venezuela | 1 |
| Total | | 8 |

== Squads ==
There were no age restrictions for the squads.

== Group stage ==
The tournament's groups were announced on 23 April 2023. Fixtures were announced on 30 May 2023.

=== Group A ===
| Pos | Team | Pld | W | D | L | GF | GA | GD | Pts | Qualification |
|---|---|---|---|---|---|---|---|---|---|---|
| 1 | Venezuela | 3 | 3 | 0 | 0 | 10 | 1 | +9 | 9 | Advance to knockout stage |
| 2 | Centro Caribe Sports | 3 | 2 | 0 | 1 | 5 | 4 | +1 | 6 | Advance to knockout stage |
| 3 | Costa Rica | 3 | 1 | 0 | 2 | 3 | 6 | −3 | 3 | |
| 4 | Haiti | 3 | 0 | 0 | 3 | 2 | 9 | −7 | 0 | |

Source: San Salvador 2023
Rules for classification: Tiebreakers
29 June
11:00 CST (UTC−6)

| Costa Rica | 0–4 | Venezuela |
|---|---|---|
| | Report | Jiménez 17'; Viso 19', 30'; Castellanos 24' |

Estadio Nacional Las Delicias, Santa Tecla
Referee: Amairany García (Mexico)
29 June
14:00 CST (UTC−6)

| Haiti | 1–3 | Centro Caribe Sports |
|---|---|---|
| C. Joseph 76' | Report | Martínez 13', 79', 90' |

Estadio Nacional Las Delicias, Santa Tecla
Referee: Janeishka Caban (United States)

1 July
11:00 CST (UTC−6)

| Centro Caribe Sports | 2–1 | Costa Rica |
|---|---|---|
| Monterroso 25'; Álvarez 55' | Report | Morales 74' (pen.) |

Estadio Nacional Las Delicias, Santa Tecla
Referee: Sandra Benítez (El Salvador)
1 July
14:00 CST (UTC−6)

| Venezuela | 4–1 | Haiti |
|---|---|---|
| Castellanos 13', 89'; Villamizar 38'; Apóstol 84' | Report | C. Jean 8' |

Estadio Nacional Las Delicias, Santa Tecla
Referee: Mirian León (El Salvador)

3 July
11:00 CST (UTC−6)

| Centro Caribe Sports | 0–2 | Venezuela |
|---|---|---|
| | Report | Villamizar 5'; Castellanos 76' |

Estadio Nacional Las Delicias, Santa Tecla
Referee: Amairany García (Mexico)
3 July
14:00 CST (UTC−6)

| Costa Rica | 2–0 | Haiti |
|---|---|---|
| Herrera 41'; St-Cyr 78' (o.g.) | Report |

Estadio Nacional Las Delicias, Santa Tecla
Referee: Neressa Goldson (Jamaica)

=== Group B ===
| Pos | Team | Pld | W | D | L | GF | GA | GD | Pts | Qualification |
|---|---|---|---|---|---|---|---|---|---|---|
| 1 | Mexico | 3 | 3 | 0 | 0 | 14 | 5 | +9 | 9 | Advance to knockout stage |
| 2 | El Salvador (H) | 3 | 1 | 1 | 1 | 9 | 7 | +2 | 4 | Advance to knockout stage |
| 3 | Puerto Rico | 3 | 0 | 2 | 1 | 3 | 7 | −4 | 2 | |
| 4 | Jamaica | 3 | 0 | 1 | 2 | 6 | 13 | −7 | 1 | |
| 5 | Colombia | 0 | 0 | 0 | 0 | 0 | 0 | 0 | 0 | Withdrew |

Source: San Salvador 2023
Rules for classification: Tiebreakers
(H) Hosts
29 June
17:00 CST (UTC−6)

| Mexico | 4–0 | Puerto Rico |
|---|---|---|
| Casarez 5', 30'; Espinoza 27'; Palacios 79' | Report |

Estadio Nacional Las Delicias, Santa Tecla
Referee: Karitza Guerra (Honduras)
29 June
20:00 CST (UTC−6)

| Jamaica | 2–5 | El Salvador |
|---|---|---|
| Nelson 13'; Atkinson 79' | Report | Gutiérrez 5'; Sánchez 7', 54'; Cerén 27'; Velásquez 50' |

Estadio Nacional Las Delicias, Santa Tecla
Referee: Saphire Stockman (Costa Rica)

1 July
17:00 CST (UTC−6)

| Puerto Rico | 1–1 | Jamaica |
|---|---|---|
| Aguilera 19' (pen.) | Report | Buckley 22' |

Estadio Nacional Las Delicias, Santa Tecla
Referee: Merlin Soto (Honduras)
1 July
20:00 CST (UTC−6)

| El Salvador | 2–3 | Mexico |
|---|---|---|
| Cerén 66' (pen.); Reyes 89' | Report | Casarez 46', 77'; Burkenroad 48' |

Estadio Nacional Las Delicias, Santa Tecla
Referee: Astrid Gramajo (Centro Caribe Sports)

3 July
17:00 CST (UTC−6)

| Jamaica | 3–7 | Mexico |
|---|---|---|
| Atkinson 36'; Adamolekun 55' (pen.); Dayes 76' | Report | Espinoza 8'; Corral 24'; Palacios 27', 38'; Mayor 71', 90'; Burkenroad 75' |

Estadio Nacional Las Delicias, Santa Tecla
Referee: Karitza Guerra (Honduras)
3 July
20:00 CST (UTC−6)

| Puerto Rico | 2–2 | El Salvador |
|---|---|---|
| DeJesus 22', 45' | Report | Gutiérrez 5'; Cerén 90' |

Estadio Nacional Las Delicias, Santa Tecla
Referee: Glenda López (Guatemala)

== Knockout stage ==
If necessary, extra time and penalty shoot-out were used to decide the winner.

Semi-finals
5 July – Santa Tecla
Venezuela | 2
El Salvador | 1
5 July – Santa Tecla
Mexico | 6
Centro Caribe Sports | 0

Gold medal match
7 July – Santa Tecla
Venezuela | 1
Mexico (a.e.t.) | 2
Bronze medal match
7 July – Santa Tecla
El Salvador | 2
Centro Caribe Sports | 1

=== Semi-finals ===
5 July
16:00 CST (UTC−6)

| Venezuela | 2–1 | El Salvador |
|---|---|---|
| Viso 13'; Castellanos 60' | Report | Cerén 90+4' |

Estadio Nacional Las Delicias, Santa Tecla
Referee: Saphire Stockman (Costa Rica)

5 July
19:30 CST (UTC−6)

| Mexico | 6–0 | Centro Caribe Sports |
|---|---|---|
| Burkenroad 1'; Palacios 7'; Ovalle 12' (pen.); Espinoza 32'; Zuazua 73'; Corral 82' | Report |

Estadio Nacional Las Delicias, Santa Tecla
Referee: Neressa Goldson (Jamaica)

=== Bronze medal match ===
7 July
16:00 CST (UTC−6)

| El Salvador | 2–1 | Centro Caribe Sports |
|---|---|---|
| Gutiérrez 33'; Sánchez 80' | Report | Monterroso 24' |

Estadio Nacional Las Delicias, Santa Tecla
Referee: Amairany García (Mexico)

=== Gold medal match ===
7 July
19:30 CST (UTC−6)

| Venezuela | 1–2 (a.e.t.) | Mexico |
|---|---|---|
| Viso 66' | Report | Mayor 49'; Mauleón 116' |

Estadio Nacional Las Delicias, Santa Tecla
Referee: Mirian León (El Salvador)

2023 Central American and Caribbean Games
Women's football tournament winners

Mexico
3rd title

== Goalscorers ==
There were 67 goals scored in 16 matches, for an average of 4.19 goals per match.

5 goals

- (Venezuela) Deyna Castellanos

4 goals

- (El Salvador) Brenda Cerén
- (Mexico) Jasmine Casarez
- (Mexico) Kiana Palacios
- (Venezuela) Ysaura Viso

3 goals

- Ana Lucía Martínez
- (El Salvador) Danya Gutiérrez
- (El Salvador) Victoria Sánchez
- (Mexico) Christina Burkenroad
- (Mexico) Greta Espinoza
- (Mexico) Stephany Mayor

2 goals

- María Monterroso
- (Jamaica) Natoya Atkinson
- (Mexico) Charlyn Corral
- (Puerto Rico) Jailene DeJesus
- (Venezuela) Paola Villamizar

1 goal

- Andrea Álvarez
- (Costa Rica) Alexa Herrera
- (Costa Rica) María José Morales
- (El Salvador) Karen Reyes
- (El Salvador) Jackeline Velásquez
- (Haiti) Carine Jean
- (Haiti) Chloe Amelie Joseph
- (Jamaica) Olufolasade Adamolekun
- (Jamaica) Shaneil Buckley
- (Jamaica) Mikayla Dayes
- (Jamaica) Shanhaine Nelson
- (Mexico) Natalia Mauleón
- (Mexico) Lizbeth Ovalle
- (Mexico) Miah Zuazua
- (Puerto Rico) Jill Aguilera
- (Venezuela) Floriangel Apóstol
- (Venezuela) Marianyela Jiménez

1 own goal

- (Haiti) Meghane St-Cyr (against Costa Rica)

Source: San Salvador 2023
