= Estadio Las Delicias =

Stadium in Santa Tecla, El Salvador

- Templo del Fútbol Salvadoreño "Temple of Salvadoran Football"
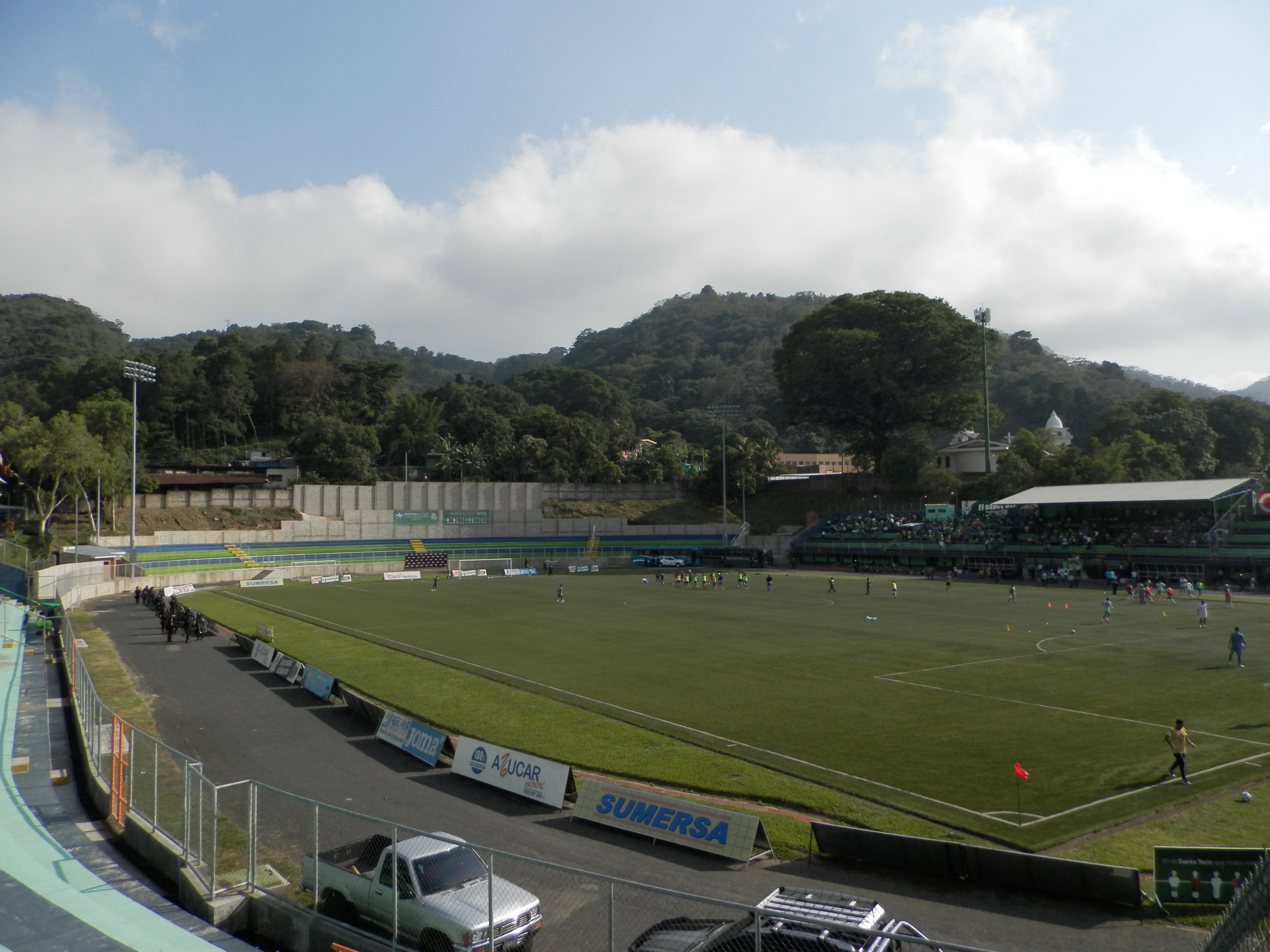
- Interactive map of Estadio Las Delicias
- Full name: Estadio Atlético Las Delicias
- Location: Santa Tecla, La Libertad, El Salvador
- Coordinates: 13°40′18″N 89°17′58″W
- Owner: Alcaldía Municipal de Santa Tecla
- Capacity: 10,000
- Surface: Grass
- Field size: 105 m × 68 m (344 ft × 223 ft)

Construction
- Built: 1951
- Renovated: 2012, 2023

Tenants
- Santa Tecla F.C. (2007–2024); Inter FA (2025–present); El Salvador national football team (selected matches)

Estadio Las Delicias is a multi-use stadium in Santa Tecla, El Salvador. It is currently used mostly for football matches and is the home stadium of Inter FA. The stadium holds a capacity of 10,000 spectators.

== Sport events ==
The stadium was one of the venues for the 2023 Central American and Caribbean Games.
