= 2018–19 Tigres UANL (women) season =

UANL
2018–19 season
- Chairman: Miguel Ángel Garza
- Manager: Ramón Villa Zevallos
- Stadium: Estadio Universitario
- Apertura: Runners-up (1st)
- Clausura: Winners (3rd)
- Top goalscorer: Katty Martínez (24 goals)
- Biggest win: UANL 7–0 Necaxa (12 November 2018)
- Biggest defeat: Atlas 2–1 UANL (9 March 2019)
Home colours	Away colours

The 2018–19 season was UANL's second competitive season and second season in the Liga MX Femenil, the top flight of Mexican women's football.

UANL qualified to the playoffs on both Apertura 2018 and Clausura 2019 tournaments, reaching the final twice. On the Apertura, Tigres lost the final in penalties against América. On the Clausura, UANL won the championship defeating Monterrey in a rematch of the Clausura 2018 final.

== Squad ==
=== Apertura ===
No.	Nat.	Name	Date of birth (age)	Since
Goalkeepers
1	(Mexico)	Alejandra Gutiérrez	9 September 1994 (aged 23)	2018
20	(Mexico)	Ofelia Solís	27 February 1996 (aged 22)	2017
29	(Mexico)	Ángeles Martínez	18 February 1996 (aged 22)	2017
33	(Mexico)	Vania Villalobos	6 November 2003 (aged 14)	2018
Defenders
2	(Mexico)	Akemi Yokoyama	28 October 1999 (aged 18)	2017
3	(Mexico)	Jazmín Enrigue	9 May 2000 (aged 18)	2017
4	(Mexico)	Greta Espinoza	5 June 1995 (aged 23)	2018
13	(Mexico)	Karen Luna	12 February 1998 (aged 20)	2017
17	(Mexico)	Natalia Villarreal	19 March 1998 (aged 20)	2017
22	(Mexico)	Selene Cortés	3 October 1998 (aged 19)	2017
23	(Mexico)	Paulina Solís	13 March 1996 (aged 22)	2018
26	(Mexico)	Julissa Dávila	13 September 1997 (aged 20)	2017
34	(Mexico)	Johana López	15 July 2001 (aged 16)	2018
Midfielders
6	(Mexico)	Nancy Antonio	2 April 1996 (aged 22)	2017
7	(Mexico)	Liliana Mercado (Captain)	22 October 1988 (aged 29)	2017
8	(Mexico)	Carolina Jaramillo	19 March 1994 (aged 24)	2017
11	(Mexico)	Nayeli Rangel	28 February 1992 (aged 26)	2017
14	(Mexico)	Lizbeth Ovalle	19 October 1999 (aged 18)	2017
15	(Mexico)	Cristina Ferral	16 February 1993 (aged 25)	2018
16	(Mexico)	Sonia Vázquez	28 July 1996 (aged 21)	2018
18	(Mexico)	Belén Cruz	7 November 1998 (aged 19)	2017
24	(Mexico)	Vanessa González	3 June 1999 (aged 19)	2017
25	(Mexico)	Melisa Ramos	17 April 1997 (aged 21)	2017
32	(Mexico)	Mariana Elizondo	10 October 2002 (aged 15)	2017
35	(Mexico)	Alexia Espinoza	16 March 2002 (aged 16)	2018
Forwards
5	(Mexico)	Fernanda Elizondo	27 July 1991 (aged 26)	2018
9	(Mexico)	Evelyn González	5 December 1996 (aged 21)	2017
10	(Mexico)	Katty Martínez	14 March 1998 (aged 20)	2017
19	(Mexico)	Blanca Solís	30 April 1996 (aged 22)	2017
30	(Mexico)	Alison González	31 January 2002 (aged 16)	2018
31	(Mexico)	Natalia Miramontes	2 March 2002 (aged 16)	2018

=== Clausura ===
No.	Nat.	Name	Date of birth (age)	Since
Goalkeepers
1	(Mexico)	Alejandra Gutiérrez	9 September 1994 (aged 24)	2018
20	(Mexico)	Ofelia Solís	27 February 1996 (aged 22)	2017
29	(Mexico)	Ángeles Martínez	18 February 1996 (aged 22)	2017
33	(Mexico)	Vania Villalobos	6 November 2003 (aged 15)	2018
Defenders
2	(Mexico)	Akemi Yokoyama	28 October 1999 (aged 19)	2017
3	(Mexico)	Jazmín Enrigue	9 May 2000 (aged 18)	2017
4	(Mexico)	Greta Espinoza	5 June 1995 (aged 23)	2018
13	(Mexico)	Karen Luna	12 February 1998 (aged 20)	2017
17	(Mexico)	Natalia Villarreal	19 March 1998 (aged 20)	2017
22	(Mexico)	Selene Cortés	3 October 1998 (aged 20)	2017
23	(Mexico)	Paulina Solís	13 March 1996 (aged 22)	2018
Midfielders
6	(Mexico)	Nancy Antonio	2 April 1996 (aged 22)	2017
7	(Mexico)	Liliana Mercado (Captain)	22 October 1988 (aged 30)	2017
8	(Mexico)	Carolina Jaramillo	19 March 1994 (aged 24)	2017
11	(Mexico)	Nayeli Rangel	28 February 1992 (aged 26)	2017
14	(Mexico)	Lizbeth Ovalle	19 October 1999 (aged 19)	2017
15	(Mexico)	Cristina Ferral	16 February 1993 (aged 25)	2018
16	(Mexico)	Sonia Vázquez	28 July 1996 (aged 22)	2018
18	(Mexico)	Belén Cruz	7 November 1998 (aged 20)	2017
21	(Mexico)	Jaquelín García	23 December 1997 (aged 21)	2019
24	(Mexico)	Vanessa González	3 June 1999 (aged 19)	2017
27	(Mexico)	Liliana Rodríguez	27 February 1996 (aged 22)	2019
31	(Mexico)	Natalia Miramontes	2 March 2002 (aged 16)	2018
32	(Mexico)	Mariana Elizondo	10 October 2002 (aged 16)	2017
Forwards
5	(Mexico)	Fernanda Elizondo	27 July 1991 (aged 27)	2018
9	(Mexico)	Evelyn González	5 December 1996 (aged 22)	2017
10	(Mexico)	Katty Martínez	14 March 1998 (aged 20)	2017
19	(Mexico)	Blanca Solís	30 April 1996 (aged 22)	2017

== Transfers ==
=== In ===
Pos.	Player	Moving from	Transfer window	Ref.
MF	(Mexico) Cristina Ferral	(France) Marseille	Summer	
MF	(Mexico) Greta Espinoza	(Spain) Levante	Summer	
MF	(Mexico) Jaquelín García	León	Winter	
MF	(Mexico) Liliana Rodríguez	Toluca	Winter	
MF	(Mexico) Natalia Gómez Junco	(Spain) Málaga	Winter	

=== Out ===
Pos.	Player	Moving to	Transfer window	Ref.
FW	(Mexico) Fabiola Ibarra	Atlas	Summer	
GK	(Mexico) Ana Gabriela Paz	Atlas	Summer	
FW	(Mexico) Alison González	Atlas	Winter	

== Coaching staff ==
Position	Staff
Manager	(Mexico) Ramón Villa Zevallos
Assistant manager	(Mexico) Alejandro González
Fitness coach	(Mexico) Diego Fernández
Doctor	(Mexico) Nancy Guevara
Medical assistant/Kinesiologist	(Mexico) Linda Montemayor
Kit manager	(Mexico) Oscar Méndez

== Competitions ==
=== Overview ===
Competition	First match	Last match	Starting round	Final position	Record							
Competition	First match	Last match	Starting round	Final position	Pld	W	D	L	GF	GA	GD	Win %
Apertura	16 July 2018	15 December 2018	Matchday 1	runners-up	22	14	8	0	61	26	+35	63.64
Clausura	7 January 2019	13 May 2019	Matchday 1	Winners	22	16	4	2	48	16	+32	72.73
Total					44	30	12	2	109	42	+67	68.18

Source: Competitions

=== Torneo Apertura ===
==== League table ====
Pos	Team	Pld	W	D	L	GF	GA	GD	Pts	Qualification or relegation
1	UANL	16	12	4	0	51	19	+32	40	Advance to Liguilla (Note: The top four teams of each group advance to the quarterfinals of the Liguilla.)
2	Pachuca	16	12	2	2	31	14	+17	38	Advance to Liguilla
3	América (C)	16	11	2	3	28	12	+16	35	Advance to Liguilla
4	Guadalajara	16	9	4	3	30	16	+14	31	Advance to Liguilla
5	Monterrey	16	8	6	2	38	15	+23	30	Advance to Liguilla

Source: Liga MX Femenil
Rules for classification: 1) Points; 2) Goal difference; 3) Number of goals scored; 4) Number of away goals scored; 5) Head-to-head results between tied teams; 6) Drawing of lots
(C) Champions

==== Matches ====
16 July 2018 1	UANL	4–2	Querétaro	San Nicolás de los Garza, Nuevo León
20:00	F. Elizondo 8', 50'; Mercado 55'; A. González 87'	Report	Tapia 71', 85'	Stadium: Estadio Universitario; Referee: Karen Hernández

20 July 2018 2	León	1–3	UANL	León, Guanajuato
19:00	Muñoz 90+3'	Report	F. Elizondo 14'; Enrigue 35'; A. González 71'	Stadium: Estadio León; Referee: Diana Pérez

30 July 2018 3	UANL	2–2	Atlas	San Nicolás de los Garza, Nuevo León
20:00	A. González 67', 78'	Report	Rodríguez 83'; Ibarra 86'	Stadium: Estadio Universitario; Referee: Héctor Pineda

6 August 2018 4	Santos Laguna	1–4	UANL	Torreón, Coahuila
21:00	Flores 66' (pen.)	Report	Mercado 6', 26' (pen.); A. González 7'; F. Elizondo 78'	Stadium: Estadio Corona; Referee: José Luis Luna

13 August 2018 5	UANL	2–2	Monterrey	San Nicolás de los Garza, Nuevo León
20:00	Antonio 13'; Rangel 72' (pen.)	Report	Monsiváis 17'; Evangelista 54'	Stadium: Estadio Universitario; Referee: Priscila Pérez

17 August 2018 6	Necaxa	1–3	UANL	Aguascalientes City, Aguascalientes
16:00	Villalobos 32'	Report	A. González 21'; Antonio 71'; E. González 76'	Stadium: Estadio Victoria; Referee: Francia González

27 August 2018 7	UANL	4–0	Morelia	San Nicolás de los Garza, Nuevo León
20:00	Martínez 59', 66'; Ferral 73'; Ovalle 77' (pen.)	Report		Stadium: Estadio Universitario; Referee: Diana Pérez

10 September 2018 8	Guadalajara	1–3	UANL	Zapopan, Jalisco
19:00	Palafox 26'	Report	Martínez 1', 7'; Jaramillo 33'	Stadium: Estadio Akron; Referee: Karen Hernández

17 September 2018 10	Querétaro	1–2	UANL	Querétaro City, Querétaro
16:00	Espinoza 58' (o.g.)	Report	Espinoza 21'; Rangel 90+3'	Stadium: Centro Gallo de Alto Rendimiento; Referee: Quetzalli Alvarado

24 September 2018 11	UANL	1–1	León	San Nicolás de los Garza, Nuevo León
20:00	Martínez 90+1'	Report	Valdez 55'	Stadium: Estadio Universitario; Referee: Francia González

29 September 2018 12	Atlas	1–1	UANL	Zapopan, Jalisco
16:00	Delgado 51'	Report	Jaramillo 2'	Stadium: Estadio Alfredo "Pistache" Torres; Referee: Lucila Venegas

13 October 2018 13	UANL	3–0	Santos Laguna	General Zuazua, Nuevo León
10:00	Martínez 20', 31'; Mercado 28'	Report		Stadium: Zuazua; Referee: Ana Cristina Alfaro

22 October 2018 14	Monterrey	4–5	UANL	Guadalupe, Nuevo León
21:00	Monsiváis 12', 14', 23', 74' (pen.)	Report	Cruz 5', 41'; Martínez 53', 87', 88'	Stadium: Estadio BBVA Bancomer; Referee: Karen Hernández

29 October 2018 16	Morelia	1–5	UANL	Morelia, Michoacán
16:00	Molina 76'	Report	Cruz 12'; Martínez 19'; Espinoza 31'; Elizondo 90+2'; Cruz 90+3'	Stadium: Estadio Morelos; Referee: Francia González

5 November 2018 17	UANL	2–1	Guadalajara	San Nicolás de los Garza, Nuevo León
20:00	Ovalle 57'; Cruz 87'	Report	Soto 32'	Stadium: Estadio Universitario; Referee: Katia García

12 November 2018 15	UANL	7–0	Necaxa	San Nicolás de los Garza, Nuevo León
20:00	Cruz 17'; Escobedo 35' (o.g.); E. González 39', 58', 77'; Martínez 49'; F. Elizondo 80'	Report		Stadium: Estadio Universitario; Referee: Guadalupe Arellano

==== Playoffs ====
===== Quarterfinals =====
23 November 2018 First leg	Atlas	1–2	UANL	Zapopan, Jalisco
11:00	Maldonado 87'	Report	E. González 39'; Martínez 65'	Stadium: Estadio Alfredo "Pistache" Torres; Referee: Ana Cristina Alfaro

26 November 2018 Second leg	UANL	0–0 (2–1 agg.)	Atlas	San Nicolás de los Garza, Nuevo León
20:00		Report		Stadium: Estadio Universitario; Referee: Karla García

==== Semifinals ====
30 November 2018 First leg	Guadalajara	1–1	UANL	Zapopan, Jalisco
20:00	Viramontes 16'	Report	Cruz 32'	Stadium: Estadio Akron; Referee: Gustavo Padilla

3 December 2018 Second leg	UANL	4–2 (5–3 agg.)	Guadalajara	San Nicolás de los Garza, Nuevo León
20:00	Mercado 15'; Ovalle 31'; Espinoza 41'; Jaramillo 90+1'	Report	Bejarano 29'; Palafox 39'	Stadium: Estadio Universitario; Referee: Quetzalli Alvarado

==== Final ====
11 December 2018 First leg	América	2–2	UANL	Tlalpan, Mexico City
16:00	González 42'; Cuevas 70'	Report	Peralta 72' (o.g.); Ovalle 84'	Stadium: Estadio Azteca; Referee: Priscila Pérez

15 December 2018 Second leg	UANL	1–1 (a.e.t.) (3–3 agg.) (1–3 p)	América	San Nicolás de los Garza, Nuevo León
19:00	Mercado 71' (pen.)	Report	González 45+1'	Stadium: Estadio Universitario; Referee: Quetzalli Alvarado
	Penalties
	Rangel (penalty missed); Jaramillo (penalty missed); Antonio (penalty scored); Cruz (penalty missed)		(penalty scored) Díaz; (penalty missed) García; (penalty scored) Verdugo; (penalty scored) Cuevas

=== Torneo Clausura ===
==== League table ====
Pos	Team	Pld	W	D	L	GF	GA	GD	Pts	Qualification or relegation
1	Monterrey	16	13	2	1	43	13	+30	41	Advance to Liguilla (Note: The top four teams of each group advance to the quarterfinals of the Liguilla.)
2	América	16	12	2	2	29	10	+19	38	Advance to Liguilla
3	UANL (C)	16	11	3	2	36	12	+24	36	Advance to Liguilla
4	Pachuca	16	11	3	2	33	13	+20	36	Advance to Liguilla
5	Atlas	16	11	1	4	32	18	+14	34	Advance to Liguilla

Source: Liga MX Femenil
Rules for classification: 1) Points; 2) Goal difference; 3) Number of goals scored; 4) Number of away goals scored; 5) Head-to-head results between tied teams; 6) Drawing of lots
(C) Champions

==== Matches ====
7 January 2019 1	UANL	7–1	Querétaro	San Nicolás de los Garza, Nuevo León
20:00	Ovalle 22', 77'; Rangel 28'; Martínez 29'; Enrigue 53'; Mercado 72'; V. González 89'	Report	Cruzado 70'	Stadium: Estadio Universitario; Referee: Ana Cristina Alfaro

14 January 2019 2	León	2–1	UANL	León, Guanajuato
19:00	Navarrete 68'; Valera 90+1'	Report	Ovalle 11'	Stadium: Estadio León; Referee: Lucila Venegas

21 January 2019 3	UANL	2–1	Atlas	San Nicolás de los Garza, Nuevo León
20:00	Cruz 41'; E. González 76'	Report	Ibarra 81'	Stadium: Estadio Universitario; Referee: Karen Hernández

24 January 2019 4	Santos Laguna	1–3	UANL	Torreón, Coahuila
11:00	Flores 13'	Report	Cruz 2'; F. Elizondo 4'; B. Solís 44'	Stadium: Estadio Corona; Referee: Mario Alberto Loredo

28 January 2019 5	UANL	1–1	Monterrey	San Nicolás de los Garza, Nuevo León
20:00	Martínez 23'	Report	Cadena 90+5'	Stadium: Estadio Universitario; Referee: Karla García

1 February 2018 6	Necaxa	1–4	UANL	Aguascalientes City, Aguascalientes
16:00	Enríquez 34'	Report	Mercado 6'; Martínez 39'; Ovalle 53'; E. González 58'	Stadium: Estadio Victoria; Referee: Lizzet García

11 February 2019 7	UANL	4–0	Morelia	San Nicolás de los Garza, Nuevo León
20:00	Mercado 18' (pen.); Martínez 66', 85' (pen.); S. Cruz 87' (o.g.)	Report		Stadium: Estadio Universitario; Referee: Alejandro Duarte

18 February 2019 8	Guadalajara	0–0	UANL	Zapopan, Jalisco
19:00		Report		Stadium: Estadio Akron; Referee: Priscila Pérez

24 February 2019 10	Querétaro	1–4	UANL	Querétaro City, Querétaro
16:00	Arredondo 27' (pen.)	Report	Antonio 6', 24'; Espinoza 77'; Cruz 83'	Stadium: Estadio Corregidora; Referee: Karla García

4 March 2019 11	UANL	3–1	León	San Nicolás de los Garza, Nuevo León
20:00	Cruz 21'; Rodríguez 81', 87'	Report	Franco 90+2'	Stadium: Estadio Universitario; Referee: Diana Pérez

9 March 2019 12	Atlas	2–1	UANL	Zapopan, Jalisco
11:00	Ibarra 40' (pen.); González 42'	Report	Rodríguez 72'	Stadium: Estadio Alfredo "Pistache" Torres; Referee: Lucila Venegas

18 March 2019 13	UANL	2–0	Santos Laguna	San Nicolás de los Garza, Nuevo León
20:00	Mercado 52' (pen.); Ovalle 64'	Report		Stadium: Estadio Universitario; Referee: Martín Molina

25 March 2019 14	Monterrey	0–1	UANL	Guadalupe, Nuevo León
19:00		Report	Martínez 64'	Stadium: Estadio BBVA Bancomer; Referee: Diana Pérez

29 March 2019 15	UANL	0–0	Necaxa	San Nicolás de los Garza, Nuevo León
20:25		Report		Stadium: Estadio Universitario; Referee: Felipe Moreno

8 April 2019 16	Morelia	0–1	UANL	Morelia, Michoacán
16:00		Report	Rangel 14'	Stadium: Estadio Morelos; Referee: Lizzet García

15 April 2019 17	UANL	2–1	Guadalajara	San Nicolás de los Garza, Nuevo León
20:00	Cruz 4'; Padilla 87' (o.g.)	Report	Huerta 7'	Stadium: Estadio Universitario; Referee: Priscila Pérez

==== Playoffs ====
===== Quarterfinals =====
25 April 2019 First leg	Puebla	1–2	UANL	Puebla, Puebla City
19:00	Jiménez 66'	Report	Martínez 70'; Mercado 90+2' (pen.)	Stadium: Estadio Cuauhtémoc; Referee: Lizzet García

29 April 2019 Second leg	UANL	2–0 (4–1 agg.)	Puebla	San Nicolás de los Garza, Nuevo León
20:00	Espinoza 65'; Anguiano 81' (o.g.)	Report		Stadium: Estadio Universitario; Referee: Luis Alfredo García

===== Semifinals =====
2 May 2019 First leg	UANL	2–0	América	San Nicolás de los Garza, Nuevo León
21:00	Martínez 33', 59'	Report		Stadium: Estadio Universitario; Referee: Karen Hernández

5 May 2019 Second leg	América	1–3 (1–5 agg.)	UANL	Tlalpan, Mexico City
16:00	Cázares 43'	Report	Ovalle 39'; Martínez 56', 75'	Stadium: Estadio Azteca; Referee: Katia García

===== Final =====
10 May 2019 First leg	UANL	1–1	Monterrey	San Nicolás de los Garza, Nuevo León
21:00	Frías 61' (o.g.)	Report	Castillo 70'	Stadium: Estadio Universitario; Referee: Karen Hernández

13 May 2019 Second leg	Monterrey	1–2 (2–3 agg.)	UANL	Guadalupe, Nuevo León
20:00	Cervantes 67'	Report	B. Solís 8'; Ovalle 25'	Stadium: Estadio BBVA Bancomer; Referee: Diana Pérez

== Statistics ==
=== Appearances and goals ===
No.	Pos	Nat	Player	Total		Apertura		Clausura	
No.	Pos	Nat	Player	Apps	Goals	Apps	Goals	Apps	Goals
1	GK	(Mexico) MEX	Alejandra Gutiérrez	18	0	15	0	3	0
2	DF	(Mexico) MEX	Akemi Yokoyama	9	0	8	0	1	0
3	DF	(Mexico) MEX	Jazmín Enrigue	23	2	12	1	11	1
4	DF	(Mexico) MEX	Greta Espinoza	40	5	19	3	21	2
5	FW	(Mexico) MEX	Fernanda Elizondo	23	7	12	6	11	1
6	MF	(Mexico) MEX	Nancy Antonio	32	4	15	2	17	2
7	MF	(Mexico) MEX	Liliana Mercado	41	11	20	6	21	5
8	MF	(Mexico) MEX	Carolina Jaramillo	22	3	16	3	6	0
9	FW	(Mexico) MEX	Evelyn González	38	7	16	5	22	2
10	FW	(Mexico) MEX	Katty Martínez	32	24	16	13	16	11
11	MF	(Mexico) MEX	Nayeli Rangel	20	4	12	2	8	2
13	DF	(Mexico) MEX	Karen Luna	34	0	20	0	14	0
14	MF	(Mexico) MEX	Lizbeth Ovalle	29	12	12	5	17	7
15	MF	(Mexico) MEX	Cristina Ferral	31	1	14	1	17	0
16	MF	(Mexico) MEX	Sonia Vázquez	11	0	5	0	6	0
17	DF	(Mexico) MEX	Natalia Villarreal	16	0	6	0	10	0
18	MF	(Mexico) MEX	Belén Cruz	37	11	16	6	21	5
19	FW	(Mexico) MEX	Blanca Solís	22	2	11	0	11	2
20	GK	(Mexico) MEX	Ofelia Solís	14	0	0	0	14	0
21	MF	(Mexico) MEX	Jaquelín García	8	0	0	0	8	0
22	DF	(Mexico) MEX	Selene Cortés	33	0	11	0	22	0
23	DF	(Mexico) MEX	Paulina Solís	10	0	7	0	3	0
24	MF	(Mexico) MEX	Vanessa González	11	1	6	0	5	1
25	MF	(Mexico) MEX	Melisa Ramos	5	0	5	0	0	0
26	DF	(Mexico) MEX	Julissa Dávila	2	0	2	0	0	0
27	MF	(Mexico) MEX	Liliana Rodríguez	9	0	6	0	3	0
29	GK	(Mexico) MEX	Ángeles Martínez	8	0	6	0	2	0
31	FW	(Mexico) MEX	Natalia Miramontes	8	0	3	0	5	0
32	MF	(Mexico) MEX	Mariana Elizondo	6	0	3	0	3	0
33	GK	(Mexico) MEX	Vania Villalobos	6	0	2	0	4	0
34	DF	(Mexico) MEX	Johana López	1	0	1	0	0	0
Players that left the club during the season
30	FW	(Mexico) MEX	Alison González	13	6	13	6	0	0

=== Goalscorers ===
Rank	Pos.	No.	Player	Apertura	Clausura	Total
1	FW	10	(Mexico) Katty Martínez	13	11	24
2	MF	14	(Mexico) Lizbeth Ovalle	5	7	12
3	MF	7	(Mexico) Liliana Mercado	6	5	11
3	MF	18	(Mexico) Belén Cruz	6	5	11
5	FW	5	(Mexico) Fernanda Elizondo	6	1	7
5	FW	9	(Mexico) Evelyn González	5	2	7
7	FW	30	(Mexico) Alison González	6	0	6
8	DF	4	(Mexico) Greta Espinoza	3	2	5
9	MF	6	(Mexico) Nancy Antonio	2	2	4
9	MF	11	(Mexico) Nayeli Rangel	2	2	4
11	MF	8	(Mexico) Carolina Jaramillo	3	0	3
11	MF	27	(Mexico) Liliana Rodríguez	0	3	3
13	DF	3	(Mexico) Jazmín Enrigue	1	1	2
13	FW	19	(Mexico) Blanca Solís	0	2	2
15	MF	15	(Mexico) Cristina Ferral	1	0	1
15	MF	24	(Mexico) Vanessa González	0	1	1
Own goals				2	4	6
Total				61	48	109

=== Hat-tricks ===
Player	Against	Result	Date	Competition	Ref.
(Mexico) Katty Martínez	Monterrey	5–4 (A)	22 October 2018	Liga MX Femenil	
(Mexico) Evelyn González	Necaxa	7–0 (H)	12 November 2018	Liga MX Femenil	

=== Own goals ===
Player	Against	Result	Date	Competition
(Mexico) Greta Espinoza	Querétaro	2–1 (A)	17 September 2018	Liga MX Femenil
