= 2017–18 Tigres UANL (women) season =

UANL
2017–18 season
- Chairman: Alejandro Rodríguez
- Manager: Osvaldo Batocletti
- Stadium: Estadio Universitario
- Apertura: Semifinals (2nd)
- Clausura: Winners (3rd)
- Top goalscorer: Belén Cruz (16 goals)
- Biggest win: UANL 9–0 León (19 August 2017)
- Biggest defeat: Pachuca 4–0 UANL (6 November 2017)
Home colours	Away colours

The 2017–18 season was UANL's first competitive season and first season in the Liga MX Femenil, the top flight of Mexican women's football.

UANL qualified for the Apertura 2017 playoffs after finishing second during the regular phase of the tournament, but were eliminated in semifinals by Pachuca.

For the next tournament, Tigres finished third and this time managed to win the Clausura 2018 after defeating Monterrey in penalties in the women's version of the Clásico Regiomontano.

== Squad ==
=== Apertura ===
No.	Nat.	Name	Date of birth (age)	Since
Goalkeepers
1	(Mexico)	Ana Gabriela Paz	21 December 1995 (aged 21)	2017
20	(Mexico)	Ofelia Solís	27 February 1996 (aged 21)	2017
29	(Mexico)	Ángeles Martínez	18 February 1996 (aged 21)	2017
Defenders
2	(Mexico)	Akemi Yokoyama	28 October 1999 (aged 17)	2017
3	(Mexico)	Jazmín Enrigue	9 May 2000 (aged 17)	2017
13	(Mexico)	Karen Luna	12 February 1998 (aged 19)	2017
26	(Mexico)	Julissa Dávila	13 September 1997 (aged 19)	2017
27	(Mexico)	Giselle Rendón	2 September 1996 (aged 20)	2017
Midfielders
6	(Mexico)	Nancy Antonio	2 April 1996 (aged 21)	2017
7	(Mexico)	Liliana Mercado (Captain)	22 October 1988 (aged 28)	2017
8	(Mexico)	Carolina Jaramillo	19 March 1994 (aged 23)	2017
11	(Mexico)	Nayeli Rangel (Vice-captain)	28 February 1992 (aged 25)	2017
14	(Mexico)	Lizbeth Ovalle	19 October 1999 (aged 17)	2017
17	(Mexico)	Natalia Villarreal	19 March 1998 (aged 19)	2017
18	(Mexico)	Belén Cruz	7 November 1998 (aged 18)	2017
22	(Mexico)	Selene Cortés	3 October 1998 (aged 18)	2017
24	(Mexico)	Vanessa González	3 June 1999 (aged 18)	2017
25	(Mexico)	Melisa Ramos	17 April 1997 (aged 20)	2017
30	(Mexico)	Lanny Silva	25 February 1993 (aged 24)	2017
34	(Mexico)	Elizabeth Estrada	4 April 2000 (aged 17)	2017
Forwards
9	(Mexico)	Evelyn González	5 December 1996 (aged 20)	2017
10	(Mexico)	Katty Martínez	14 March 1998 (aged 19)	2017
19	(Mexico)	Blanca Solís	30 April 1996 (aged 21)	2017
21	(Mexico)	Fabiola Ibarra	2 February 1994 (aged 23)	2017

=== Clausura ===
No.	Nat.	Name	Date of birth (age)	Since
Goalkeepers
1	(Mexico)	Ana Gabriela Paz	21 December 1995 (aged 22)	2017
20	(Mexico)	Ofelia Solís	27 February 1996 (aged 21)	2017
29	(Mexico)	Ángeles Martínez	18 February 1996 (aged 21)	2017
Defenders
2	(Mexico)	Akemi Yokoyama	28 October 1999 (aged 18)	2017
3	(Mexico)	Jazmín Enrigue	9 May 2000 (aged 17)	2017
4	(Mexico)	María Fernanda Pontigo	20 October 1991 (aged 26)	2018
13	(Mexico)	Karen Luna	12 February 1998 (aged 19)	2017
26	(Mexico)	Julissa Dávila	13 September 1997 (aged 20)	2017
Midfielders
6	(Mexico)	Nancy Antonio	2 April 1996 (aged 21)	2017
7	(Mexico)	Liliana Mercado (Captain)	22 October 1988 (aged 29)	2017
8	(Mexico)	Carolina Jaramillo	19 March 1994 (aged 23)	2017
11	(Mexico)	Nayeli Rangel (Vice-captain)	28 February 1992 (aged 25)	2017
14	(Mexico)	Lizbeth Ovalle	19 October 1999 (aged 18)	2017
17	(Mexico)	Natalia Villarreal	19 March 1998 (aged 19)	2017
18	(Mexico)	Belén Cruz	7 November 1998 (aged 19)	2017
22	(Mexico)	Selene Cortés	3 October 1998 (aged 19)	2017
24	(Mexico)	Vanessa González	3 June 1999 (aged 18)	2017
25	(Mexico)	Melisa Ramos	17 April 1997 (aged 20)	2017
32	(Mexico)	Mariana Elizondo	10 October 2002 (aged 15)	2017
34	(Mexico)	Elizabeth Estrada	4 April 2000 (aged 17)	2017
35	(Mexico)	Alexia Espinoza	16 March 2002 (aged 15)	2018
Forwards
5	(Mexico)	Fernanda Elizondo	27 July 1991 (aged 26)	2018
9	(Mexico)	Evelyn González	5 December 1996 (aged 21)	2017
10	(Mexico)	Katty Martínez	14 March 1998 (aged 19)	2017
19	(Mexico)	Blanca Solís	30 April 1996 (aged 21)	2017
21	(Mexico)	Fabiola Ibarra	2 February 1994 (aged 23)	2017
30	(Mexico)	Alison González	31 January 2002 (aged 15)	2018

== Transfers ==
=== In ===
Pos.	Player	Moving from	Transfer window	Ref.
MF	(Mexico) Nayeli Rangel	(Spain) Sporting de Huelva	Summer	

== Coaching staff ==
Position	Staff
Manager	(Mexico) Osvaldo Batocletti
Assistant manager	(Mexico) Miguel Razo
Doctor	(Mexico) Nancy Guevara
Kinesiologist	(Mexico) Jesús Montemayor
Kit manager	(Mexico) Oscar Méndez
Kit manager	(Mexico) Diego Fernández

== Competitions ==
=== Overview ===
Competition	First match	Last match	Starting round	Final position	Record							
Competition	First match	Last match	Starting round	Final position	Pld	W	D	L	GF	GA	GD	Win %
Apertura	29 July 2017	11 November 2017	Matchday 1	Semifinals (2nd)	16	12	1	3	54	11	+43	75.00
Clausura	5 January 2018	4 May 2018	Matchday 1	Winners	18	11	3	4	46	22	+24	61.11
Total					34	23	4	7	100	33	+67	67.65

Source: Competitions

=== Torneo Apertura ===
==== League table ====
Pos	Team	Pld	W	D	L	GF	GA	GD	Pts	Qualification or relegation
1	América	14	11	2	1	48	11	+37	35	Advance to Liguilla (Note: The two best teams of each group advance to the semifinals of the Liguilla.)
2	UANL	14	11	1	2	51	7	+44	34	Advance to Liguilla
3	Guadalajara (C)	14	11	1	2	33	10	+23	34	Advance to Liguilla
4	Monterrey	14	10	1	3	38	17	+21	31	
5	Pachuca	14	9	3	2	36	16	+20	30	Advance to Liguilla

Source: Liga MX Femenil
Rules for classification: 1) Points; 2) Goal difference; 3) Number of goals scored; 4) Number of away goals scored; 5) Head-to-head results between tied teams; 6) Drawing of lots
(C) Champions

==== Matches ====
29 July 2017 1	Querétaro	0–0	UANL	Querétaro City, Querétaro
11:30		Report		Stadium: Centro Gallo de Alto Rendimiento; Referee: Erik González

5 August 2017 2	UANL	2–0	Guadalajara	San Nicolás de los Garza, Nuevo León
21:15	B. Solís 2'; Jaramillo 12'	Report		Stadium: Estadio Universitario; Referee: Oscar Eduardo Peña

12 August 2017 3	Santos Laguna	0–6	UANL	Torreón, Coahuila
9:00		Report	Jaramillo 30', 44'; B. Solís 51'; Enrigue 54'; Ovalle 78'; Villarreal 88'	Referee: Mario Alberto Loredo

19 August 2017 4	UANL	9–0	León	San Nicolás de los Garza, Nuevo León
21:05	Jaramillo 3', 6', 9', 82'; B. Solís 17', 22', 47'; Antonio 20'; Martínez 51'	Report		Stadium: Estadio Universitario; Referee: Josué Antonio Suárez

26 August 2017 5	UANL	4–0	Atlas	San Nicolás de los Garza, Nuevo León
21:05	Cruz 7', 17', 22'; Ovalle 53'	Report		Stadium: Estadio Universitario; Referee: Carlos Alberto Rojas

2 September 2017 6	Monterrey	2–1	UANL	Guadalupe, Nuevo León
19:15	R. Bernal 6'; Solís 80'	Report	B. Solís 42'	Stadium: Estadio BBVA Bancomer; Referee: Edgar de Lira

9 September 2017 7	UANL	3–0	Necaxa	General Zuazua, Nuevo León
21:05	Ovalle 10'; Rangel 77' (pen.); Cruz 80'	Report		Stadium: Zuazua; Referee: Oscar Rosales

16 September 2017 8	UANL	4–0	Querétaro	San Nicolás de los Garza, Nuevo León
19:00	Rangel 47', 85'; Mercado 61' (pen.), 75'	Report		Stadium: Estadio Universitario; Referee: Juan Francisco Sánchez

30 September 2017 10	UANL	7–1	Santos Laguna	San Nicolás de los Garza, Nuevo León
21:05	Jaramillo 4'; Martínez 5', 88'; Ovalle 16', 37'; Antonio 41'; Mercado 84' (pen.)	Report	Adriano 45'	Stadium: Estadio Universitario; Referee: Héctor Pineda

6 October 2017 11	León	1–8	UANL	León, Guanajuato
17:00	Gómez 5'	Report	Cruz 3', 76', 77'; B. Solís 18'; Rangel 24' (o.g.); Mercado 30'; Ovalle 59'; Martínez 89'	Stadium: Estadio León; Referee: Iván de Jesús Velasco

15 October 2017 12	Atlas	1–2	UANL	Guadalajara, Jalisco
11:00	Álvarez 72'	Report	Martínez 56'; Mercado 67'	Stadium: Estadio Jalisco; Referee: Luis Miguel Galván

18 October 2017 9	Guadalajara	1–0	UANL	Zapopan, Jalisco
16:00	Palafox 57'	Report		Stadium: Verde Valle; Referee: Miguel Ángel Anaya

21 October 2017 13	UANL	4–1	Monterrey	San Nicolás de los Garza, Nuevo León
21:05	Jaramillo 9'; Martínez 12', 45'; Rangel 25'	Report	Evangelista 62'	Stadium: Estadio Universitario; Referee: Aldo Ballesteros

27 October 2017 14	Necaxa	0–1	UANL	Aguascalientes City, Aguascalientes
16:00		Report	Enrigue 80'	Stadium: Casa Club Necaxa; Referee: Adrián Vielmas

==== Playoffs ====
===== Semifinals =====
6 November 2017 First leg	Pachuca	4–0	UANL	Pachuca, Hidalgo
21:00	Ocampo 63' (pen.); Ángeles 71', 90+2'; Nieto 89'	Report		Stadium: Estadio Hidalgo; Referee: Alan López

11 November 2017 Second leg	UANL	3–0 (3–4 agg.)	Pachuca	San Nicolás de los Garza, Nuevo León
19:00	Rangel 29'; Ovalle 55'; Mercado 65'	Report		Stadium: Estadio Universitario; Referee: Francia González

=== Torneo Clausura ===
==== League table ====
Pos	Team	Pld	W	D	L	GF	GA	GD	Pts	Qualification or relegation
1	Monterrey	14	11	1	2	45	13	+32	34	Advance to Liguilla (Note: The two best teams of each group advance to the semifinals of the Liguilla.)
2	América	14	10	3	1	47	11	+36	33	Advance to Liguilla
3	UANL (C)	14	10	1	3	38	16	+22	31	Advance to Liguilla
4	Guadalajara	14	9	2	3	30	13	+17	29	
5	Toluca	14	9	2	3	22	13	+9	29	Advance to Liguilla

Source: Liga MX Femenil
Rules for classification: 1) Points; 2) Goal difference; 3) Number of goals scored; 4) Number of away goals scored; 5) Head-to-head results between tied teams; 6) Drawing of lots
(C) Champions

==== Matches ====
5 January 2018 1	Necaxa	0–2	UANL	Aguascalientes City, Aguascalientes
16:00		Report	Martínez 62'; A. González 90+1'	Stadium: Estadio Victoria; Referee: Priscila Pérez

13 January 2018 2	UANL	2–0	Atlas	San Nicolás de los Garza, Nuevo León
21:00	Jaramillo 38'; Antonio 47'	Report		Stadium: Estadio Universitario; Referee: Martín Navarro

22 January 2018 3	Santos Laguna	0–2	UANL	Torreón, Coahuila
21:00		Report	Rangel 9'; A. González 54'	Stadium: Estadio Corona; Referee: Felipe Moreno

27 January 2018 4	Querétaro	3–2	UANL	Querétaro City, Querétaro
11:00	Moreno 23'; Cruzado 42'; Arredondo 72'	Report	B. Solís 46'; Rangel 81' (pen.)	Stadium: Estadio Corregidora; Referee: Iván López

3 February 2018 5	UANL	6–1	León	General Zuazua, Nuevo León
9:00	F. Elizondo 4'; Rangel 8' (pen.); Cruz 37', 77'; Martínez 56'; Ovalle 85'	Report	Vázquez 64'	Stadium: Zuazua; Referee: Erick García

10 February 2018 6	Guadalajara	1–2	UANL	Zapopan, Jalisco
16:00	Morales 6'	Report	Cruz 11'; Luna 17'	Stadium: Verde Valle; Referee: Erik González

19 February 2018 7	UANL	0–2	Monterrey	San Nicolás de los Garza, Nuevo León
20:00		Report	Solís 9'; Valdez 40'	Stadium: Estadio Universitario; Referee: Eduardo Vázquez

26 February 2018 8	UANL	4–0	Necaxa	San Nicolás de los Garza, Nuevo León
20:00	Mercado 1'; Jaramillo 4'; Martínez 32'; A. González 89'	Report		Stadium: Estadio Universitario; Referee: Juan Francisco Sánchez

3 March 2018 9	Atlas	1–3	UANL	Zapopan, Jalisco
11:00	García 29'	Report	Mercado 59' (pen.); Martínez 66'; A. González 77'	Stadium: Estadio Alfredo "Pistache" Torres; Referee: Juan José Gutiérrez

12 March 2018 10	UANL	2–1	Santos Laguna	San Nicolás de los Garza, Nuevo León
20:00	F. Elizondo 2'; Mercado 89' (pen.)	Report	Hernández 30'	Stadium: Estadio Universitario; Referee: Kevin Contreras

18 March 2018 11	UANL	7–0	Querétaro	San Nicolás de los Garza, Nuevo León
18:00	Cruz 5', 34'; Jaramillo 8'; Enrigue 14'; Antonio 39', 89'; Ovalle 70'	Report		Stadium: Estadio Universitario; Referee: Aldo Ballesteros

23 March 2018 12	León	2–2	UANL	León, Guanajuato
17:00	Vázquez 31'; Vargas 90' (pen.)	Report	Cruz 45'; A. González 74'	Stadium: Estadio León; Referee: Guillermo Pacheco

2 April 2018 13	UANL	2–5	Guadalajara	San Nicolás de los Garza, Nuevo León
20:00	Jaramillo 22', 86'	Report	Soto 4', 47'; Viramontes 46', 63'; Tovar 62' (pen.)	Stadium: Estadio Universitario; Referee: Ricardo Norman

8 April 2018 14	Monterrey	0–2	UANL	Santiago, Nuevo León
10:30		Report	Cruz 40'; Ovalle 53'	Stadium: El Barrial; Referee: Antonio Olalde

==== Playoffs ====
===== Semifinals =====
16 April 2018 First leg	UANL	3–0	América	San Nicolás de los Garza, Nuevo León
20:00	B. Solís 17'; Jaramillo 41'; Cruz 46'	Report		Stadium: Estadio Universitario; Referee: Priscila Pérez

22 April 2018 Second leg	América	2–1 (2–4 agg.)	UANL	Tlalpan, Mexico City
17:00	Fuentes 10'; Antonio 74' (o.g.)	Report	Ovalle 61'	Stadium: Estadio Azteca; Referee: Antonio Olalde

===== Final =====
27 April 2018 First leg	UANL	2–2	Monterrey	San Nicolás de los Garza, Nuevo León
21:00	Cruz 10'; López 90+4' (o.g.)	Report	R. Bernal 24' (pen.); Monsiváis 26'	Stadium: Estadio Universitario; Referee: Mario Terrazas

4 May 2018 Second leg	Monterrey	2–2 (a.e.t.) (4–4 agg.) (2–4 p)	UANL	Guadalupe, Nuevo León
20:30	R. Bernal 49' (pen.); Armenta 90+2'	Report	Ovalle 18'; Martínez 78'	Stadium: Estadio BBVA Bancomer; Referee: Eduardo Alberto Vázquez
	Penalties
	R. Bernal (penalty missed); Garza (penalty scored); Castillo (penalty scored); Armenta (penalty missed)		(penalty scored) Rangel; (penalty scored) Antonio; (penalty scored) Villarreal; (penalty scored) Mercado

== Statistics ==
=== Appearances and goals ===
No.	Pos	Nat	Player	Total		Apertura		Clausura	
No.	Pos	Nat	Player	Apps	Goals	Apps	Goals	Apps	Goals
1	GK	(Mexico) MEX	Ana Gabriela Paz	15	0	11	0	4	0
2	DF	(Mexico) MEX	Akemi Yokoyama	28	0	15	0	13	0
3	DF	(Mexico) MEX	Jazmín Enrigue	22	0	13	0	9	0
4	DF	(Mexico) MEX	María Fernanda Pontigo	2	0	0	0	2	0
5	FW	(Mexico) MEX	Fernanda Elizondo	8	2	0	0	8	2
6	MF	(Mexico) MEX	Nancy Antonio	31	5	16	2	15	3
7	MF	(Mexico) MEX	Liliana Mercado	28	9	13	6	15	3
8	MF	(Mexico) MEX	Carolina Jaramillo	33	15	15	9	18	6
9	FW	(Mexico) MEX	Evelyn González	16	0	10	0	6	0
10	FW	(Mexico) MEX	Katty Martínez	23	12	13	7	10	5
11	MF	(Mexico) MEX	Nayeli Rangel	26	8	15	5	11	3
13	DF	(Mexico) MEX	Karen Luna	24	1	7	0	17	1
14	MF	(Mexico) MEX	Lizbeth Ovalle	25	12	12	7	13	5
17	MF	(Mexico) MEX	Natalia Villarreal	29	1	14	1	15	0
18	MF	(Mexico) MEX	Belén Cruz	27	16	12	7	15	9
19	FW	(Mexico) MEX	Blanca Solís	23	9	12	7	11	2
20	GK	(Mexico) MEX	Ofelia Solís	8	0	5	0	3	0
21	FW	(Mexico) MEX	Fabiola Ibarra	20	0	12	0	8	0
22	MF	(Mexico) MEX	Selene Cortés	19	0	10	0	9	0
24	MF	(Mexico) MEX	Vanessa González	11	0	6	0	5	0
25	MF	(Mexico) MEX	Melisa Ramos	8	0	3	0	5	0
26	DF	(Mexico) MEX	Julissa Dávila	5	0	5	0	0	0
29	GK	(Mexico) MEX	Ángeles Martínez	11	0	0	0	11	0
30	FW	(Mexico) MEX	Alison González	12	5	0	0	12	5
32	MF	(Mexico) MEX	Mariana Elizondo	11	0	0	0	11	0
34	MF	(Mexico) MEX	Elizabeth Estrada	3	0	1	0	2	0
35	MF	(Mexico) MEX	Alexia Espinoza	2	0	0	0	2	0
Players that left the club during the season
27	DF	(Mexico) MEX	Giselle Rendón	3	0	3	0	0	0
30	MF	(Mexico) MEX	Lanny Silva	2	0	2	0	0	0

=== Goalscorers ===
Rank	Pos.	No.	Player	Apertura	Clausura	Total
1	MF	18	(Mexico) Belén Cruz	7	9	16
2	MF	8	(Mexico) Carolina Jaramillo	9	6	15
3	FW	10	(Mexico) Katty Martínez	7	5	12
3	MF	14	(Mexico) Lizbeth Ovalle	7	5	12
5	MF	7	(Mexico) Liliana Mercado	6	3	9
5	FW	19	(Mexico) Blanca Solís	7	2	9
7	MF	11	(Mexico) Nayeli Rangel	5	3	8
8	MF	6	(Mexico) Nancy Antonio	2	3	5
8	FW	30	(Mexico) Alison González	0	5	5
10	DF	3	(Mexico) Jazmín Enrigue	2	1	3
11	FW	5	(Mexico) Fernanda Elizondo	0	2	2
12	DF	13	(Mexico) Karen Luna	0	1	1
12	MF	17	(Mexico) Natalia Villarreal	1	0	1
Own goals				1	1	2
Total				54	46	100

=== Hat-tricks ===
Player	Against	Result	Date	Competition	Ref.
(Mexico) Carolina Jaramillo	León	9–0 (H)	19 August 2017	Liga MX Femenil	
(Mexico) Blanca Solís	León	9–0 (H)	19 August 2017	Liga MX Femenil	
(Mexico) Belén Cruz	Atlas	4–0 (H)	26 August 2017	Liga MX Femenil	
(Mexico) Belén Cruz	León	8–1 (A)	6 October 2017	Liga MX Femenil	

=== Own goals ===
Player	Against	Result	Date	Competition	Ref.
(Mexico) Nancy Antonio	América	1–2 (A)	22 April 2018	Liga MX Femenil	
