= Fernanda Elizondo =

Mexican footballer (born 1991)

Personal information
- Full name: María Fernanda Elizondo Ochoa
- Date of birth: 27 July 1991 (age 35)
- Place of birth: Ciudad Guzmán, Jalisco, Mexico
- Height: 1.71 m (5 ft 7 in)
- Position: Forward

College career
Years	Team	Apps	(Gls)
2013	San Diego State Aztecs	11	(0)

Senior career*
Years	Team	Apps	(Gls)
2018–2026	Tigres UANL	133	(26)
- * Club domestic league appearances and goals as of 2 September 2025

María Fernanda Elizondo Ochoa (born 27 July 1991) is a Mexican footballer who plays as a forward for Liga MX Femenil club Tigres UANL.

== Career ==
=== Early career ===
Fernanda Elizondo was born in Ciudad Guzmán on 27 July 1991.

Elizondo played college football in Guadalajara for the Universidad del Valle de México and for the Borregos Salvajes of the Monterrey Institute of Technology and Higher Education, where she won the 2011–12 national championship of CONADEIP and was named MVP of the season.

In 2013, Elizondo played for the San Diego State Aztecs women's soccer team, making 11 appearances with the team during the season.

=== Tigres UANL ===
In January 2018, Elizondo joined Liga MX Femenil team UANL and made her professional debut on 3 February 2018 in a match against León, where she also scored her first career goal four minutes into the game. The match ended with a 6–1 victory for UANL.

Elizondo was part of the UANL squad that won the Clausura 2018 and Clausura 2019 championships.

On 25 November 2019, Elizondo suffered a concussion in a match against Pachuca after clashing with Pachuca's goalkeeper Alejandría Godínez. She was taken to a hospital and later reported as stable.

== Career statistics ==
=== Club ===
As of match played 2 September 2025

Appearances and goals by club, season and competition
Club	Season	League			Concacaf		Total	
Club	Season	Division	Apps	Goals	Apps	Goals	Apps	Goals
UANL	2017–18	Liga MX Femenil	8	2	—		8	2
UANL	2018–19	Liga MX Femenil	21	7	—		21	7
UANL	2019–20	Liga MX Femenil	11	2	—		11	2
UANL	2020–21	Liga MX Femenil	28	5	—		28	5
UANL	2021–22	Liga MX Femenil	29	7	—		29	7
UANL	2022–23	Liga MX Femenil	12	0	—		12	0
UANL	2023–24	Liga MX Femenil	12	2	—		12	2
UANL	2024–25	Liga MX Femenil	11	1	1	0	12	1
UANL	2025–26	Liga MX Femenil	1	0	—		1	0
UANL	Total		133	12	1	0	134	26
Career total			133	26	1	0	134	26

== Honours ==
UANL

- Liga MX Femenil: Clausura 2018
- Liga MX Femenil: Clausura 2019
- Liga MX Femenil: Guard1anes 2020
- Liga MX Femenil: Guard1anes 2021
