= Battocletti =

Battocletti is an Italian surname from Trentino. Notable people with the surname include:

- Giuliano Battocletti (born 1975), Italian long-distance runner
- Nadia Battocletti (born 2000), Italian middle- and long-distance runner

== See also ==
- Batocletti
