= Enrigue =

Enrigue is a surname. Notable people with the surname include:

- Álvaro Enrigue (born 1969), Mexican novelist, short-story writer, essayist, and academic
- Jazmín Enrigue (born 2000), Mexican footballer
