= Mia Villalpando =

Mexican-American footballer (born 2008)

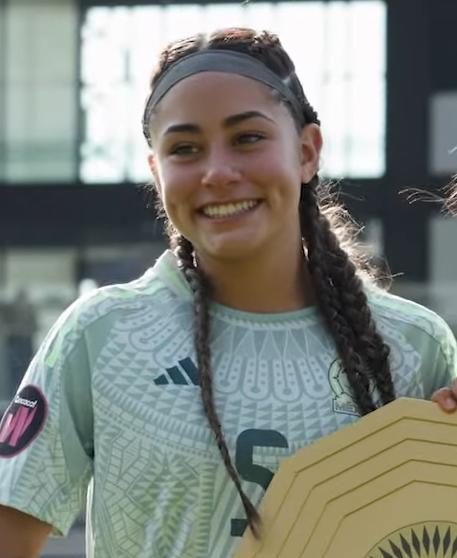
- Villalpando with Mexico U17 in 2025

Personal information
- Full name: Mia Isabella Villalpando Valderrama
- Date of birth: 10 May 2008 (age 18)
- Place of birth: Bonita, California, United States
- Height: 1.60 m (5 ft 3 in)
- Position: Defender

Team information
- Current team: Tigres UANL
- Number: 3

Youth career
- 2022–2024: San Diego Surf SC
- 2024–2025: Tigres UANL U19

Senior career*
Years	Team	Apps	(Gls)
2025–	Tigres UANL	6	(0)

International career^{‡}
2022–2023	United States U15	2	(0)
2024–	Mexico U17	14	(2)
Medal record
Women's football
Representing Mexico
FIFA U-17 Women's World Cup
Third place	2025 Morocco
CONCACAF Women's U-17 Championship
Runner-up	2024 Mexico
- * Club domestic league appearances and goals as of 24 November 2025 ‡ National team caps and goals as of 8 November 2025

Mia Isabella Villalpando Valderrama (born 10 May 2008) is a professional footballer who plays as a defender for Liga MX Femenil club Tigres UANL. Born in the United States, she is a youth international for Mexico. She was previously a youth international for the United States.

== Early life ==
A daughter of Mexican parents, Villalpando was born in Bonita, California, and began her training at San Diego Surf SC.

== Club career ==
In 2024, Villalpando moved to Mexico to join the under-19 side of Tigres UANL She played her first professional match with Tigres UANL during the 2025 Liga MX Femenil Apertura season, coming on as a substitute in the 73rd minute for Sabrina Enciso in a 5–1 victory against Pumas UNAM on matchday 11. At the end of the tournament, she secured the league championship with her club and received a scholarship to play for the UCLA Bruins in the United States. She later decomitted and re-signed with Tigres in December 2025.

== International career ==
From 2022 to 2023, she was part of the United States national under-15 team under head coaches Katie Schoepfer and Ciara Crinion, where she played two friendly matches against the Netherlands and Germany.

In 2024, Villalpando switched to represent the Mexico under-17 team. With the under-17s, she secured second place at the 2024 CONCACAF Women's U-17 Championship and third place at the 2025 FIFA U-17 Women's World Cup hosted in Morocco, where she scored two penalties during shoot-outs against Italy and Brazil.

== Career statistics ==
=== Club ===
As of match played 23 November 2025

Appearances and goals by club, season and competition
Club	Season	League			Continental		Other		Total	
Club	Season	Division	Apps	Goals	Apps	Goals	Apps	Goals	Apps	Goals
Tigres UANL	Apertura 2025	Liga MX Femenil	6	0	0	0	0	0	0	0
Tigres UANL	Total		6	0	0	0	0	0	0	0
Career total			6	0	0	0	0	0	0	0

== Honors ==
Tigres UANL

- Liga MX Femenil: 2025 Apertura

Mexico U-17

- FIFA U-17 Women's World Cup third place: 2025
- CONCACAF Women's U-17 Championship runner-up: 2024
