= Alejandra Gutiérrez (footballer) =

Mexican footballer (born 1994)

Personal information
- Full name: Alejandra Gutiérrez Carrillo
- Date of birth: 2 July 1994 (age 32)
- Place of birth: Cuautla, Morelos, Mexico
- Height: 1.68 m (5 ft 6 in)
- Position: Goalkeeper

Senior career*
Years	Team	Apps	(Gls)
2018–2021	UANL	17	(0)
2021–2024	Tijuana	59	(0)

International career^{‡}
2009–2010	Mexico U17		
2011–2012	Mexico U20		
- * Club domestic league appearances and goals as of 4 June 2023 ‡ National team caps and goals as of 12 March 2022

Alejandra Gutiérrez Carrillo (born 2 July 1994) is a former Mexican professional footballer who last played as a goalkeeper for Liga MX Femenil side Tijuana.

== Career ==
In 2018, she started her career in UANL. In 2021, she was transferred to Tijuana.

== International career ==
Gutiérrez represented Mexico at the 2010 FIFA U-17 Women's World Cup, the 2012 CONCACAF Women's U-20 Championship and the 2012 FIFA U-20 Women's World Cup.
