= Jaquelín García =

Mexican footballer (born 1997)

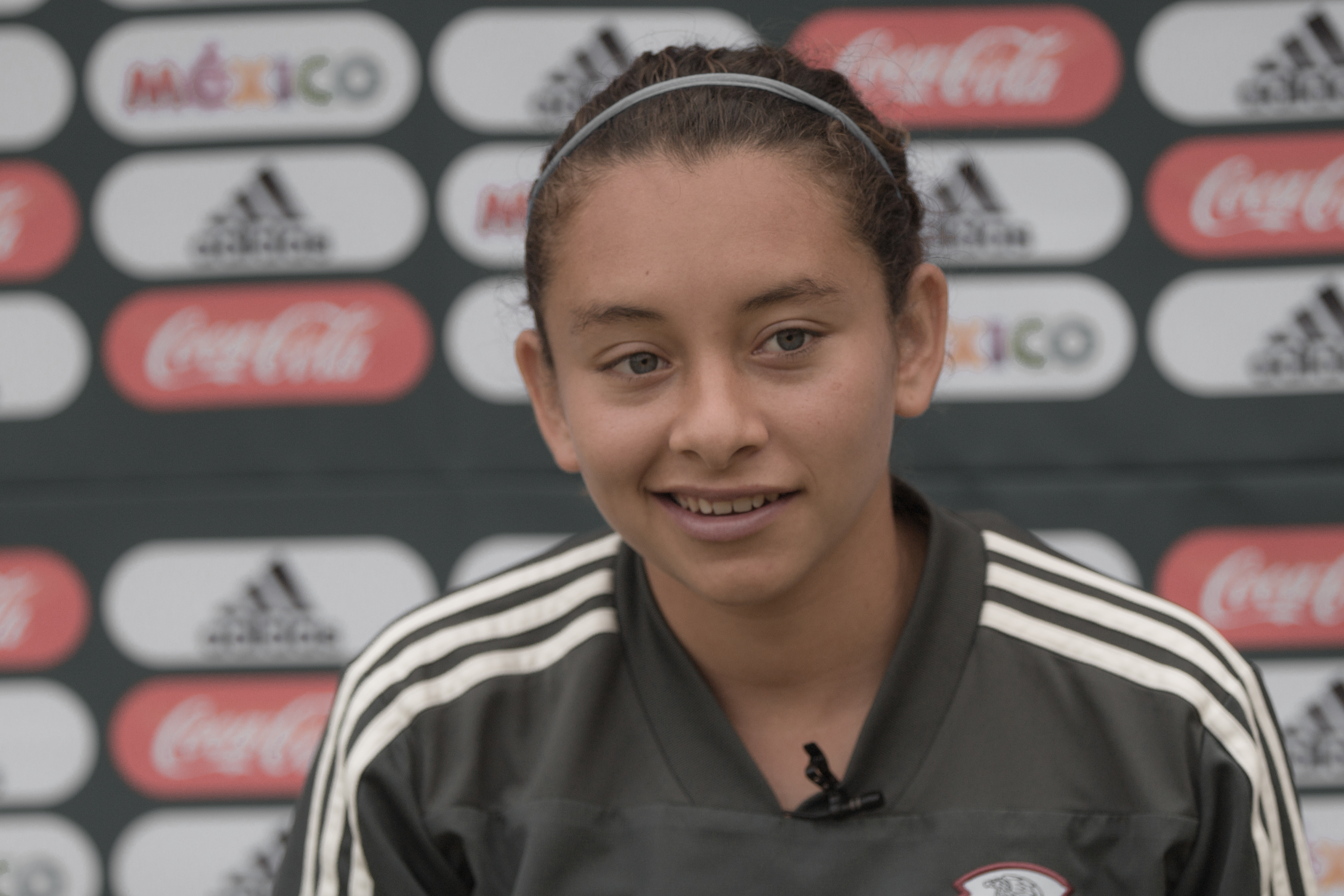
- Cruz in 2016

Personal information
- Full name: Jaquelín García Cruz
- Date of birth: 23 December 1997 (age 28)
- Place of birth: Lázaro Cárdenas, Michoacán, Mexico
- Height: 1.65 m (5 ft 5 in)
- Position: Winger

Team information
- Current team: Tijuana
- Number: 7

Senior career*
Years	Team	Apps	(Gls)
2017–2018	Pachuca	29	(6)
2018	León	15	(0)
2019	UANL	8	(0)
2019–2021	UNAM	34	(7)
2021–2023	Querétaro	24	(6)
2023–2024	Atlético San Luis	28	(2)
2024–2026	Atlas	53	(3)
2026–	Tijuana	0	(0)

International career
2018–	Mexico		
- * Club domestic league appearances and goals as of 6 February 2026

Jaquelín García Cruz (born 23 December 1997), is a Mexican professional football winger who currently plays for Tijuana of the Liga MX Femenil.

== Club career ==
=== Pachuca ===
On 28 July 2017, García made her first appearance for Pachuca in a 3–0 victory against Pumas UNAM. On August 19 she scored her first two goals against Cruz Azul in a 1–9 away victory in the Azul Stadium.

== International career ==
On 20 February 2018, García Cruz received her first call up to the National team.

== Career statistics ==
=== Club ===
As of 19 January 2018.

Club statistics
Club	Season	League (Note: Includes Liguilla)			National Cup		Continental		Total	
Club	Season	Division	Apps	Goals	Apps	Goals	Apps	Goals	Apps	Goals
Pachuca	2017–18	Liga MX Femenil	19	4	4	0	—		23	4
Pachuca	Total		19	4	4	0	0	0	23	4
Career total			19	4	4	0	0	0	23	4

== Honours ==
Pachuca

- Copa MX Femenil: 2017

Mexico U17

- CONCACAF Women's U-17 Championship: 2013
