= Katty Martínez =

Mexican footballer (born 1998)

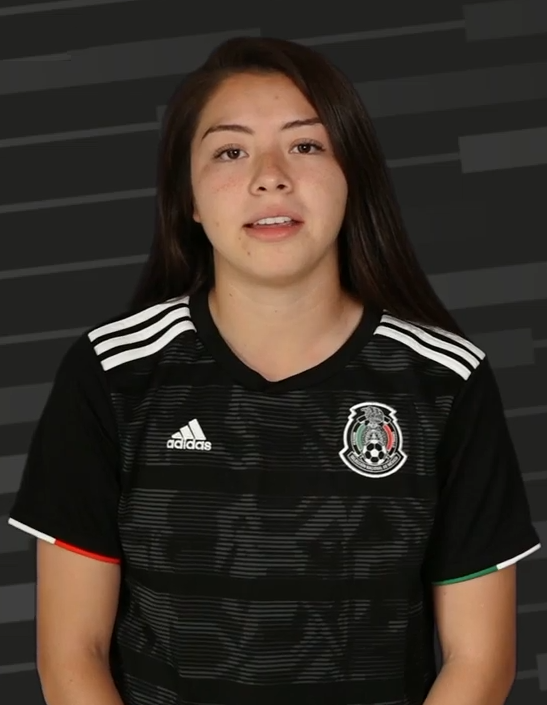
- Martínez with Mexico in 2019

Personal information
- Full name: Katty Martínez Abad
- Date of birth: 14 March 1998 (age 28)
- Place of birth: Monterrey, Nuevo León, Mexico
- Height: 1.60 m (5 ft 3 in)
- Position: Forward

Team information
- Current team: Monterrey
- Number: 26

Senior career*
Years	Team	Apps	(Gls)
2017–2021	Tigres UANL	133	(95)
2022–2024	América	99	(53)
2024–	Monterrey	36	(6)

International career^{‡}
2015–2018	Mexico U20	12	(5)
2019–	Mexico	21	(8)
- * Club domestic league appearances and goals as of 2 February 2026 ‡ National team caps and goals as of 19 February 2025

Katty Martínez Abad (born 14 March 1998) is a Mexican professional footballer who plays as a forward for Liga MX Femenil club Monterrey and the Mexico women's national team.

== International career ==
Martínez represented Mexico at two CONCACAF Women's U-20 Championship editions (2015 and 2018) and two FIFA U-20 Women's World Cup editions (2016 and 2018). She made her senior debut on 27 February 2019 in a friendly match against Italy.

== Career statistics ==
=== Club ===
As of match played March 23, 2024

Appearances and goals by club, season and competition
Club	Season	League			Total	
Club	Season	Division	Apps	Goals	Apps	Goals
UANL	2017–18	Liga MX Femenil	17	11	17	11
UANL	2018–19	Liga MX Femenil	20	18	20	18
UANL	2019–20	Liga MX Femenil	19	15	19	15
UANL	2020–21	Liga MX Femenil	26	25	26	25
UANL	2021–22	Liga MX Femenil	13	12	13	12
Total			95	81	95	81
América	2021–22	Liga MX Femenil	15	9	15	9
América	2022–23	Liga MX Femenil	13	4	16	6
América	2023–24	Liga MX Femenil	19	12	20	13
Total			47	25	51	28
Monterrey	2024–25	Liga MX Femenil	24	5	29	5
Total			24	5	29	5
Career total			166	111	175	114

=== International goals ===
Scores and results list Mexico's goal tally first

No.	Date	Venue	Opponent	Score	Result	Competition
1	6 August 2019	Estadio Universidad San Marcos, Lima, Peru	Panama	4–0	5–1	2019 Pan American Games

== Honors and awards ==
Tigres UANL

- Liga MX Femenil: Clausura 2018, Clausura 2019, Guardianes 2020, Guardianes 2021
- Campeón de Campeones: 2021

Club América

- Liga MX Femenil: Clausura 2023

CF Monterrey

- Liga MX Femenil: Clausura 2024

Mexico U20

- CONCACAF Women's U-20 Championship: 2018
