= Paulina Solís =

Mexican footballer (born 1996)

Personal information
- Full name: Paulina Lizeth Solís Echeverría
- Date of birth: 13 March 1996 (age 30)
- Place of birth: Jalisco, Mexico
- Height: 1.78 m (5 ft 10 in)
- Position: Defender

Senior career*
Years	Team	Apps	(Gls)
2017–2020	UANL	38	(0)
2020–2021	Damaiense	9	(0)
2021	Pachuca	4	(0)
2022–2023	Juárez	13	(0)
2023–2024	REA	19	(0)

International career
2014–2015	Mexico U17		
2015–2016	Mexico U20		
2013–2014	Mexico	7	(0)
- * Club domestic league appearances and goals as of 1 August 2024

Paulina Lizeth Solís Echeverría (born 13 March 1996) is a Mexican professional footballer who plays as a defender.

== Honours ==
=== Club ===
UANL

- Liga MX Femenil: Clausura 2018
- Liga MX Femenil: Clausura 2019
