= Hannia de Ávila =

Mexican footballer (born 2000)

Personal information
- Full name: Hannia Alejandra de Ávila Rodríguez
- Date of birth: 17 November 2000 (age 25)
- Place of birth: Torreón, Coahuila, Mexico
- Height: 1.66 m (5 ft 5 in)
- Position: Goalkeeper

Team information
- Current team: UANL
- Number: 33

Senior career*
Years	Team	Apps	(Gls)
2021–2024	Santos Laguna	33	(0)
2025	Mazatlán	8	(0)
2026–	UANL	0	(0)
- * Club domestic league appearances and goals as of 2 February 2026 ‡ National team caps and goals as of 12 March 2022

Hannia Alejandra de Ávila Rodríguez (born 17 November 2000) is a Mexican professional footballer who plays as a goalkeeper for Liga MX Femenil side UANL.

== Career ==
In 2021, she started her career in Santos Laguna. In 2025, she got transferred to Mazatlán. In 2026, she joined UANL.
