= Ángeles Martínez =

Mexican footballer (born 1996)

Personal information
- Full name: María De Los Ángeles Martínez López
- Date of birth: 7 September 1996 (age 30)
- Place of birth: Guanajuato, Mexico
- Height: 1.66 m (5 ft 5 in)
- Position: Goalkeeper

Senior career*
Years	Team	Apps	(Gls)
2017–2019	UANL	15	(0)
2019–2024	León	91	(0)
2024	Mazatlán	14	(0)
2025	Grindavík	0	(0)

International career^{‡}
2013–2014	Mexico U20		
- * Club domestic league appearances and goals as of 4 June 2023 ‡ National team caps and goals as of 12 March 2022

María De Los Ángeles Martínez López (born 18 February 1996) is a Mexican professional footballer who plays as a goalkeeper.

== Career ==
In 2017, she started her career in UANL. In 2019, she joined to León. Since 2024, she is part of Mazatlán.

== International career ==
Martínez represented Mexico at the 2014 FIFA U-20 Women's World Cup.
