= Cristina Ferral =

Mexican footballer (born 1993)

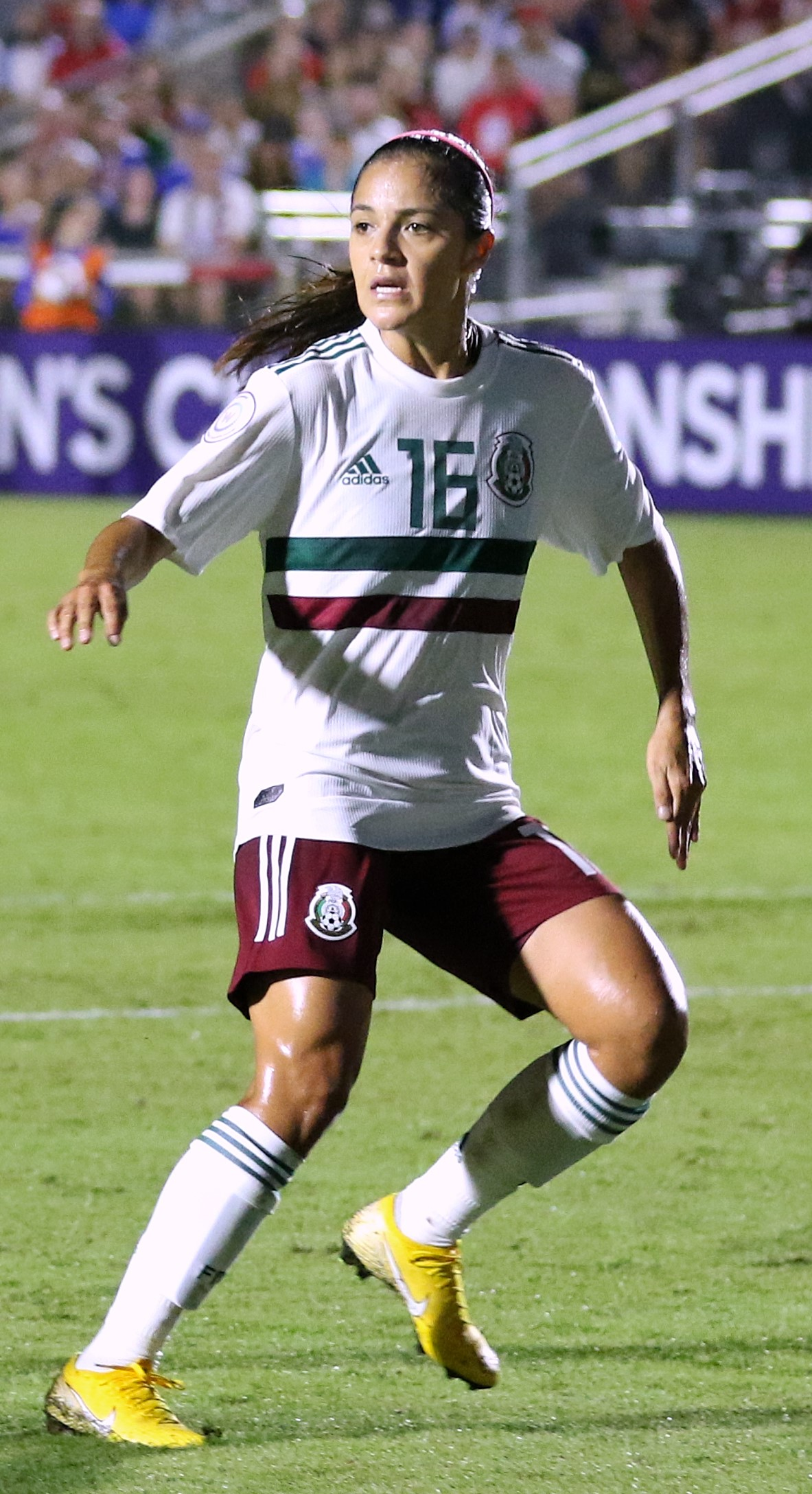
- Ferral in a match between United States and Mexico at the 2018 CONCACAF Women's Championship on October 4, 2018.

Personal information
- Full name: Cristina del Carmen Ferral Montalván
- Date of birth: 16 February 1993 (age 33)
- Place of birth: Tampico, Mexico
- Height: 1.68 m (5 ft 6 in)
- Position: Centre-back

Team information
- Current team: Guadalajara (on loan from UANL)
- Number: 5

College career
Years	Team	Apps	(Gls)
2014–2015	South Florida Bulls	44	(3)
2016	Borregos Salvajes	8	(5)

Senior career*
Years	Team	Apps	(Gls)
2017–2018	Olympique de Marseille	6	(0)
2018–	UANL	222	(4)
2026–	→ Guadalajara (loan)	5	(0)

International career^{‡}
2010	Mexico U-17	8	(0)
2012	Mexico U-20	2	(0)
2017–	Mexico	48	(2)
Medal record
Women's football
Representing Mexico
Central American and Caribbean Games
Gold medal – first place	2023 San Salvador
- * Club domestic league appearances and goals as of 31 January 2026 ‡ National team caps and goals as of 19 February 2025

Cristina del Carmen Ferral Montalván (born 16 February 1993) is a Mexican footballer who plays as a midfielder for Liga MX Femenil club Guadalajara on loan from Tigres UANL, and the Mexico women's national team.

== International career ==
Ferral represented Mexico at the 2010 CONCACAF Women's U-17 Championship, the 2010 FIFA U-17 Women's World Cup and the 2012 CONCACAF Women's U-20 Championship. She made her senior international debut on 8 July 2017.

=== International goals ===
Goal	Date	Venue	Opponent	Score	Result	Competition
1.	21 October 2017	Yongchuan Sports Center, Chongqing, China	China	1–2	3–2	2017 Yongchuan International Tournament
2.	5 December 2023	Hasely Crawford Stadium, Port of Spain, Trinidad and Tobago	Trinidad and Tobago	0–1	0–1	2024 CONCACAF W Gold Cup qualification

== Honours and achievements ==
UANL

- Liga MX Femenil: Clausura 2018
- Liga MX Femenil: Clausura 2019
