= Vanessa González (footballer) =

Mexican footballer (born 1999)

Personal information
- Full name: Vanessa González Márquez
- Date of birth: 3 June 1999 (age 27)
- Place of birth: Nuevo León, Mexico
- Height: 1.58 m (5 ft 2 in)
- Position: Right-back

Team information
- Current team: Tijuana
- Number: 14

Senior career*
Years	Team	Apps	(Gls)
2017–2020	UANL	21	(1)
2020–2022	Atlas	63	(2)
2022–2024	Atlético San Luis	65	(1)
2024–2026	Querétaro	57	(2)
2026–	Tijuana	0	(0)

International career
2015–2016	Mexico U17		
- * Club domestic league appearances and goals as of 5 February 2026

Vanessa González Márquez (born 3 June 1999) is a Mexican professional footballer who plays as a Centre-back for Liga MX Femenil side Querétaro.

== Career ==
In 2017, she started her career in UANL. In 2020, she joined to Atlas. In 2022, she was transferred to Atlético San Luis. Since 2024, she is part of Querétaro.

== International career ==
González represented Mexico at the 2016 CONCACAF Women's U-17 Championship and at the 2016 FIFA U-17 Women's World Cup.
