= Akemi Yokoyama =

Mexican footballer (born 1999)

Personal information
- Full name: María Akemi Yokoyama Carreón
- Date of birth: 28 October 1999 (age 27)
- Place of birth: Acapulco, Guerrero, Mexico
- Height: 1.68 m (5 ft 6 in)
- Position: Centre-back

Senior career*
Years	Team	Apps	(Gls)
2017–2021	UANL	36	(1)
2021–2022	UNAM	14	(1)
2023	Santos Laguna	20	(0)
2024–2025	Cruz Azul	15	(0)

International career
2015–2016	Mexico U17		
- * Club domestic league appearances and goals as of 4 June 2023

María Akemi Yokoyama Carreón (born 28 October 1999) is a Mexican professional footballer who plays as a centre-back.

== Career ==
In 2017, she started her career in UANL. In 2021, she joined to UNAM. In 2023, she was transferred to Santos Laguna. In 2024, she joined Cruz Azul.

== International career ==
Yoyokayama represented Mexico at the 2016 CONCACAF Women's U-17 Championship and at the 2016 FIFA U-17 Women's World Cup.
