= Ramón Villa Zevallos =

Mexican footballer and manager (born 1970)

Personal information
- Full name: Ramón Villa Zevallos Martínez
- Date of birth: 6 October 1970 (age 56)
- Place of birth: Mexico City, Mexico
- Height: 1.70 m (5 ft 7 in)
- Position: Forward

Senior career*
Years	Team	Apps	(Gls)
1991–1995	Club Universidad Nacional	17	(1)
1993–1994	Monterrey	6	(0)
1994–1995	Atlante	4	(0)

Managerial career
- 2007–2012: UNAM Reserves and Academy
- 2013: Pumas Morelos (Assistant)
- 2013–2014: Atlético Coatzacoalcos
- 2014–2017: Reynosa
- 2017–2018: Atlas (Assistant)
- 2018: Atlas Reserves and Academy
- 2018–2019: Tigres UANL (Women)
- 2019–2020: Guadalajara (Women)
- * Club domestic league appearances and goals

Ramón Villa Zevallos Martínez (Note: In this Spanish name, the first or paternal surname is Zevallos and the second or maternal family name is Martínez.) (born 6 October 1970) is a Mexican football manager and former player.
