= Ofelia Solís =

Mexican footballer (born 1996)

Personal information
- Full name: Ofelia Solís Garza
- Date of birth: 27 February 1996 (age 30)
- Place of birth: Coatzacoalcos, Veracruz, Mexico
- Height: 1.60 m (5 ft 3 in)
- Position: Goalkeeper

Team information
- Current team: Cruz Azul
- Number: 12

Senior career*
| Years | Team | Apps | (Gls) |
| 2017–2025 | UANL | 63 | (0) |
| 2026– | Cruz Azul | 0 | (0) |
- * Club domestic league appearances and goals as of 4 June 2023 ‡ National team caps and goals as of 12 March 2022

Ofelia Solís Garza (born 27 February 1996) is a Mexican professional footballer who plays as a goalkeeper for Liga Femenil club Cruz Azul.

== Career ==
In 2017, she started her career in UANL. Solís was part of the UANL squad that won the Clausura 2018 and Clausura 2019 championships.

== Honors and awards ==
UANL

- Liga MX Femenil: Clausura 2018, Clausura 2019, Guard1anes 2020, Guard1anes 2021, Apertura 2022, Apertura 2023
- Campeón de Campeones: 2021, 2023
