= Natalia Villarreal =

Mexican footballer (born 1998)

Personal information
- Full name: Natalia Villarreal Pardo
- Date of birth: 19 March 1998 (age 28)
- Place of birth: Monterrey, Nuevo León, Mexico
- Height: 1.55 m (5 ft 1 in)
- Position: Left-back

Team information
- Current team: Guadalajara
- Number: 17

Senior career*
Years	Team	Apps	(Gls)
2017–2025	Tigres UANL	100	(2)
2025–	Guadalajara	18	(0)

International career
2014–2015	Mexico U17		
2015–2018	Mexico U20		
- * Club domestic league appearances and goals as of 31 January 2026

Natalia Villarreal Pardo (born 19 March 1998), known as Natalia Villarreal, is a Mexican professional footballer who currently plays as a midfielder for Guadalajara in the Liga MX Femenil.

== Playing career ==
=== Club ===
==== Tigres UANL, 2017–2025 ====
During a match in December 2017 against Guerreras del Santos Laguna, Villarreal's last-minute goal led Tigres to set a league record for most goals scored by a team in a single match lifting the team to a 6–0 win.

=== International ===
Villarreal represented Mexico at the 2014 FIFA U-17 Women's World Cup in Costa Rica and the 2016 FIFA U-20 Women's World Cup in Papua New Guinea. In December 2017, she was called up by Christopher Cuellar for the 2018 CONCACAF Women's U-20 Championship in Trinidad and Tobago.

== Honors and awards ==
=== Club ===
UANL

- Liga MX Femenil: Clausura 2018
- Liga MX Femenil: Clausura 2019

=== International ===
Mexico U17

- CONCACAF Women's U-17 Championship: 2013

Mexico U20

- CONCACAF Women's U-20 Championship: 2018
