= Ana Gaby Paz =

Mexican footballer (born 1995)

Personal information
- Full name: Ana Gabriela Paz Molina
- Date of birth: 21 December 1995 (age 30)
- Place of birth: Guadalajara, Jalisco, Mexico
- Height: 1.69 m (5 ft 7 in)
- Position: Goalkeeper

Team information
- Current team: Tijuana
- Number: 1

Senior career*
Years	Team	Apps	(Gls)
2017–2018	UANL	15	(0)
2018–2024	Atlas	139	(0)
2024–2025	Monterrey	10	(0)
2026–	Tijuana	6	(0)

International career^{‡}
2011–2012	Mexico U17		
2013–2014	Mexico U20		
- * Club domestic league appearances and goals as of 9 February 2026 ‡ National team caps and goals as of 12 March 2022

Ana Gabriela Paz Molina (born 21 December 1995) is a Mexican professional footballer who plays as a goalkeeper for Liga MX Femenil side Tijuana. In 2017, she started her career in UANL. In 2020, she was transferred to Atlas. In 2024, she joined to Monterrey. Paz represented Mexico at the 2012 FIFA U-17 Women's World Cup and in the 2014 FIFA U-20 Women's World Cup.
