= Nayeli Rangel =

Mexican footballer (born 1992)

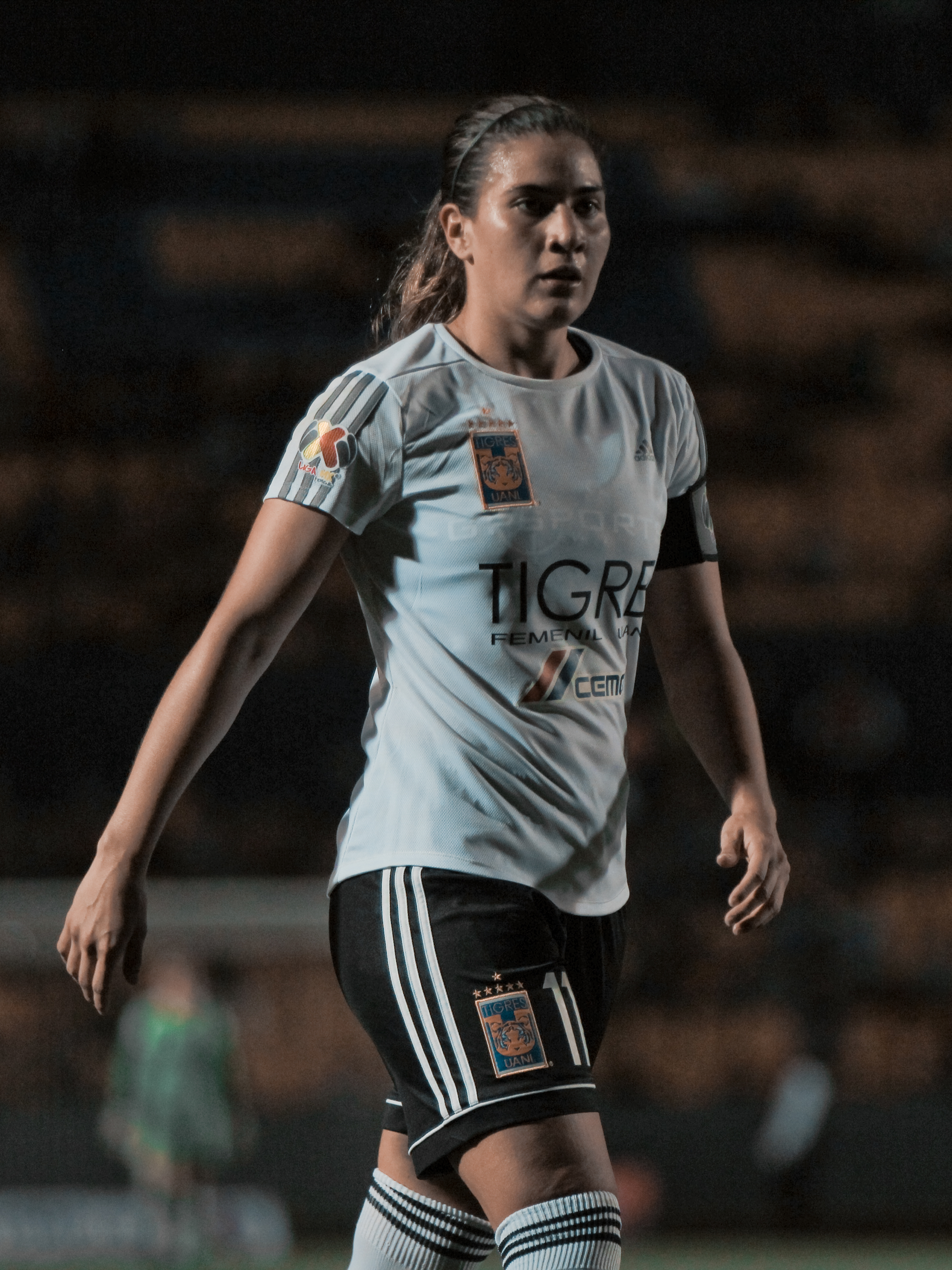
- Rangel in 2017 playing for UANL

Personal information
- Full name: Lydia Nayeli Rangel Hernández
- Date of birth: 28 February 1992 (age 34)
- Place of birth: Monterrey, Nuevo Leon, Mexico
- Height: 1.72 m (5 ft 8 in)
- Position: Defensive midfielder

Senior career*
Years	Team	Apps	(Gls)
- Tigres
2013	Sky Blue FC	10	(0)
2016–2017	Sporting de Huelva	11	(0)
2017–2025	Tigres UANL	216	(31)
2025–2026	ABB Fomget	1	(1)

International career^{‡}
2008	Mexico U17		
2008–2012	Mexico U20		
2012–2018	Mexico	81	(7)
- * Club domestic league appearances and goals as of 11 October 2025 ‡ National team caps and goals as of 18 June 2015

Lydia Nayeli Rangel Hernández (born 28 February 1992) is a Mexican footballer who plays as a midfielder.

== Early life ==
Rangel was born and raised in Monterrey, Mexico.

== Club career ==
On 11 January 2013 she joined Sky Blue FC in the new National Women's Soccer League.

In December 2016, she joined Sporting de Huelva of the Spanish first division, Primera División.

In July 2017, she joined her hometown club Tigres UANL of the newly formed Liga MX Femenil.

On 1 July 2025, Tigres announced the departure of Rangel after eight years at the club. On the same day, Turkish Super League club ABB Fomget announced Rangel as their new player.

== International career ==
Rangel was part of Mexico's squad at the 2011 FIFA Women's World Cup and captained the team at the 2015 FIFA Women's World Cup, playing three matches in each tournament.

== Honours ==
=== Club ===
UANL

- Liga MX Femenil: Clausura 2018
- Liga MX Femenil: Clausura 2019

== Personal life ==
Rangel is in a relationship.
