= Sabrina Enciso =

American soccer player (born 1999)

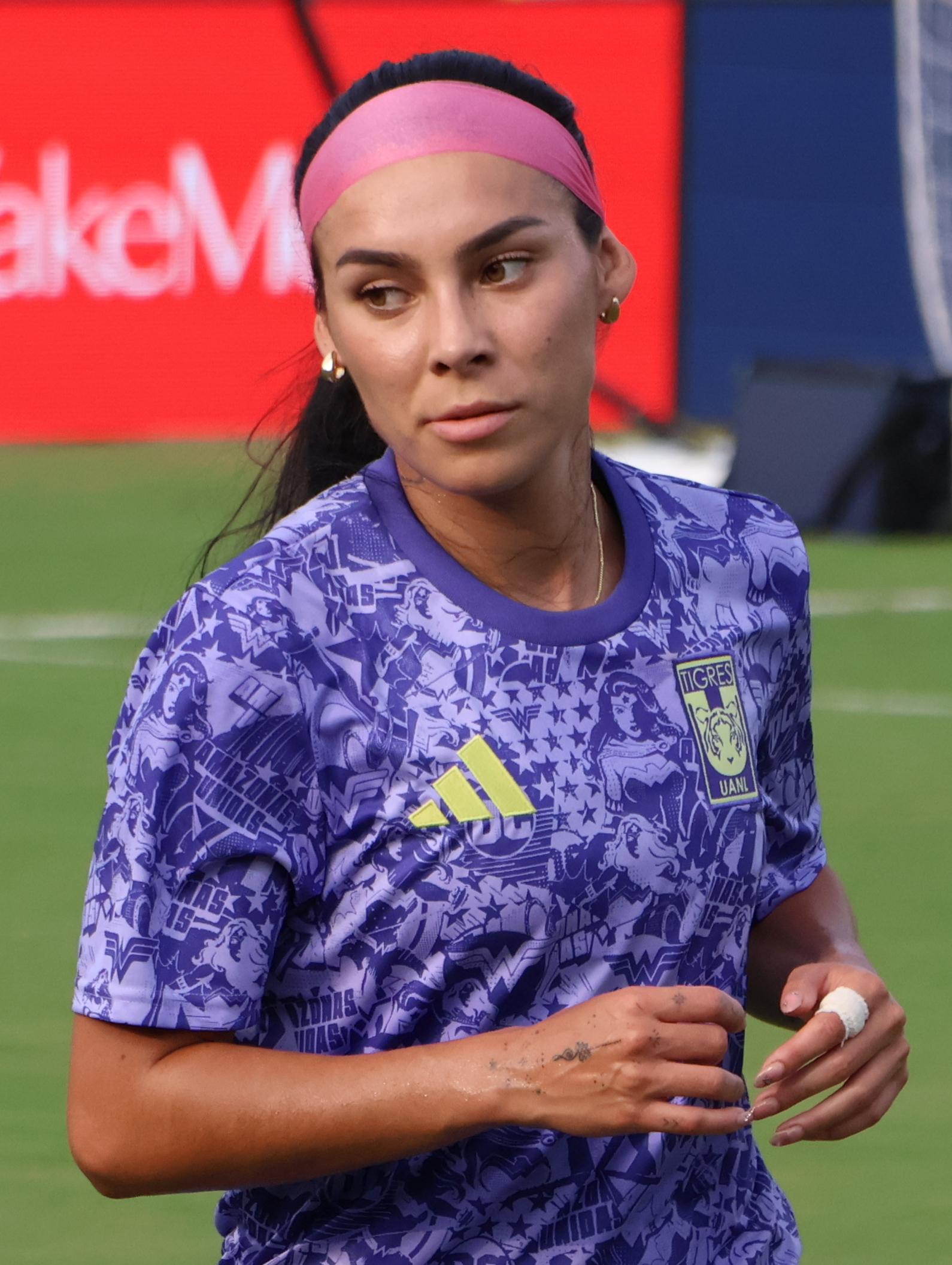
- Enciso with Tigres UANL in 2025

Personal information
- Full name: Sabrina Marie Enciso
- Date of birth: February 17, 1999 (age 27)
- Place of birth: Moreno Valley, California, U.S.
- Height: 1.69 m (5 ft 7 in)
- Position: Left-back

Team information
- Current team: UANL
- Number: 17

College career
Years	Team	Apps	(Gls)
2017–2021	Arizona Wildcats		

Senior career*
Years	Team	Apps	(Gls)
2021	FC Tucson	2	(0)
2022–2025	América	82	(1)
2025–	UANL	13	(0)
- * Club domestic league appearances and goals as of 2 September 2025

Sabrina Marie Enciso (born February 17, 1999) is an American professional soccer player who plays as defender for Liga MX Femenil club Tigres UANL.

== Early life and career ==
Born in Moreno Valley, California, Enciso trained as a soccer player at the University of Arizona, where she played for the Wildcats women's team. During her time at the university, she appeared in 19 of the 20 games in the 2019 season and logged over 1,600 minutes on the field. She subsequently played a brief stint with FC Tucson's women's team before joining América Femenil.

== Club career ==
Enciso joined América for the 2022–2023 season. Her debut with the team came on July 8, 2022, in a match against Deportivo Toluca. During the Clausura 2023, her club won the league title.

In June 2025, Enciso signed a contract with UANL.

== Personal life ==
Enciso was born to Mexican parents and is also of Paraguayan ancestry. In 2023, Enciso confirmed she is in a relationship with Alejandro Zendejas, a footballer from the Club América men's team.

== Honors ==
América

- Liga MX Femenil: Clausura 2023

UANL

- Liga MX Femenil: Apertura 2025
