= Fabiola Ibarra =

Mexican footballer (born 1994)

Personal information
- Full name: Claudia Fabiola Ibarra Muro
- Date of birth: 2 February 1994 (age 32)
- Place of birth: Guadalajara, Jalisco, Mexico
- Height: 1.68 m (5 ft 6 in)
- Position: Winger

Team information
- Current team: Tijuana
- Number: 6

Youth career
- CEFOR Guadalajara
- Cerritos College

Senior career*
Years	Team	Apps	(Gls)
2014	Club Tijuana		
2016	Michigan Chill SC	9	(1)
2017	Club Tijuana	3	(3)
2017–2018	Tigres UANL	16	(0)
2018–2023	Atlas	101	(35)
2024–2025	Pachuca	40	(3)
2026–	Tijuana	7	(0)

International career^{‡}
- Mexico U-17
- Mexico U-20
2013–	Mexico	6	(1)
- * Club domestic league appearances and goals as of 9 February 2026 ‡ National team caps and goals as of 10:53, 18 June 2015 (UTC)

Claudia Fabiola Ibarra Muro (born 2 February 1994) is a Mexican professional footballer who plays as a forward for Liga MX Femenil club Tijuana and the Mexico women's national football team.

== Playing career ==
=== Club ===
Ibarra gained experience playing in the United States at Cerritos College in California and she played in the WPSL with Tijuana Xolos USA.

In May 2016 she signed with the WPSL team Michigan Chill SC.

In April 2017 she rejoined her formed club, Tijuana Xolas, in the newly formed Mexican women's league Liga MX Femenil.

In June 2017 she was released from Tijuana Xolas and joined Tigres UANL of Monterrey. They went on to win the Liga MX Femenil championship in the league's inaugural season.

In June 2018 she was released from Tigres UANL and joined Atlas in her hometown of Guadalajara.

=== International ===
Ibarra's international career began when she was called into the U-17 Mexico national team in 2006. In 2010, Ibarra played at the U-17 World Cup qualifiers in Costa Rica where Mexico finished the competition as runners up. That same year she played at the U-17 World Cup in Trinidad and Tobago where Ibarra's outstanding performances throughout the competitions led her to be a part of the 2014 U-20 World Cup qualifiers in the Cayman Islands where Mexico, once again, would finish as runners up. Her progression and hard work continued to capture the eye of the coaching staff and she was named to the squad to travel to the 2014 U-20 World Cup in Canada. In 2015, Ibarra was included in Mexico women's national football team for the 2015 FIFA Women's World Cup in Canada where in the group game against England, Ibarra scored her first senior international goal. Ibarra also played in the 2015 Pan American Games and earned a bronze medal with Mexico in 2015.

== Honours ==
=== Club ===
UANL

- Liga MX Femenil: Clausura 2018

=== Individual ===
- Liga MX Femenil Top Scorer: 2019
