= Selene Cortés =

Mexican footballer (born 1998)

Personal information
- Full name: Selene Deyanira Cortés Valero
- Date of birth: 3 October 1998 (age 28)
- Place of birth: Monterrey, Nuevo León, Mexico
- Height: 1.57 m (5 ft 2 in)
- Position: Right-back

Team information
- Current team: León
- Number: 22

Senior career*
| Years | Team | Apps | (Gls) |
| 2017–2021 | UANL | 63 | (0) |
| 2021–2023 | Pachuca | 64 | (1) |
| 2024 | Atlas | 24 | (0) |
| 2025– | León | 34 | (0) |
- * Club domestic league appearances and goals as of 9 February 2026

Selene Deyanira Cortés Valero (born 3 October 1998) is a Mexican professional footballer who plays as a Left-back for Liga MX Femenil side León.

== Career ==
In 2017, she started her career in UANL. In 2021, she was transferred to Pachuca. In 2024, she joined to Atlas .
