= Melisa Ramos =

Mexican footballer (born 1997)

Personal information
- Full name: Melisa Alejandra Ramos Pérez
- Date of birth: 17 April 1997 (age 29)
- Place of birth: Guadalajara, Jalisco, Mexico
- Height: 1.64 m (5 ft 5 in)
- Position: Attacking midfielder

Senior career*
Years	Team	Apps	(Gls)
2017–2018	UANL	13	(0)
2020–2023	Mazatlán	76	(10)
2024	Toluca	20	(0)
- * Club domestic league appearances and goals as of 4 June 2023

Melisa Alejandra Ramos Pérez (born 17 April 1997) is a Mexican professional footballer who plays as an attacking midfielder.

== Career ==
In 2017, she started her career in UANL. In 2020, she was transferred to Mazatlán. In 2024, she joined Toluca.
