= Julissa Dávila =

Mexican footballer (born 1997)

Personal information
- Full name: Julissa Fernanda Dávila González
- Date of birth: 13 September 1997 (age 29)
- Place of birth: Monterrey Nuevo León, Mexico
- Height: 1.68 m (5 ft 6 in)
- Position: Centre-back

Team information
- Current team: UNAM
- Number: 14

Senior career*
Years	Team	Apps	(Gls)
2017–2019	UANL	7	(0)
2019–2022	Atlas	84	(2)
2022–2024	Atlético San Luis	64	(8)
2024	Cruz Azul	10	(1)
2025–	UNAM	25	(2)
- * Club domestic league appearances and goals as of 31 January 2026 ‡ National team caps and goals as of 12 March 2022

Julissa Fernanda Dávila González (born 13 September 1997) is a Mexican professional footballer who plays as a centre-back for Liga MX Femenil side UNAM.

In 2017, she started her career in UANL. In 2019, she was transferred to Atlas. In 2022, she joined to Atlético San Luis. Since 2025, she is part of UNAM after spending only one season with Cruz Azul.
