= Alison González =

Mexican footballer (born 2002)

Personal information
- Full name: Alison Hecnary González Esquivel
- Date of birth: 31 January 2002 (age 24)
- Place of birth: Tepic, Nayarit, Mexico
- Height: 1.68 m (5 ft 6 in)
- Position: Forward

Team information
- Current team: UANL
- Number: 30

Senior career*
Years	Team	Apps	(Gls)
2018	UANL	25	(11)
2019–2021	Atlas	100	(72)
2022–2023	América	61	(27)
2024–	UANL	34	(7)

International career
2017–2018	Mexico U17		
2019–2020	Mexico U20		
2021–	Mexico	10	(3)
- * Club domestic league appearances and goals as of 2 September 2025

Alison Hecnary González Esquivel (born 31 January 2002) is a Mexican professional footballer who plays as a forward for Liga MX Femenil side UANL.

== Club career ==
A native of Tepic, Nayarit, González began playing in Liga MX Femenil with Tigres UANL during 2018. She helped the club win the 2017–18 Clausura tournament, and finish runner's-up in the 2018–19 Apertura tournament, scoring eleven goals in 22 matches.

Gónzalez joined Tigres' Liga MX rivals Atlas F.C. for the 2018–19 Clausura tournament, where she formed an effective striking partnership with Mexico international Adriana Iturbide. The pair scored 35 league goals during 2019, including a González hat-trick against Atlético San Luis in their Liga MX debut.

=== Tigres UANL Femenil ===
On May 5, 2018, Tigres UANL Femenil finished as Champions of Clausura 2018

== International career ==
=== Mexico U-17 ===
On June 12, 2018, Mexico U-17 women's national football team finished as Runners-up at the 2018 CONCACAF Women's U-17 Championship.

On December 1, 2018, Mexico U-17 women's national football team finished as Runners-up at the 2018 FIFA U-17 Women's World Cup.

=== Mexico U-20 ===
On March 8, 2020, Mexico U-20 women's national football team finished as Runners-up at the 2020 CONCACAF Women's U-20 Championship.

== International goals ==
No.	Date	Venue	Opponent	Score	Result	Competition
1.	13 June 2021	Kanseki Stadium Tochigi, Utsunomiya, Japan	Japan	1–2	1–5	Friendly
2.	23 October 2021	Estadio Gregorio "Tepa" Gómez, Tepatitlán, Mexico	Argentina	3–1	6–1	Friendly
3.	23 October 2021	Estadio Gregorio "Tepa" Gómez, Tepatitlán, Mexico	Argentina	5–1	6–1	Friendly

== Honours ==
Tigres UANL

- Liga MX Femenil: Clausura 2018, Apertura 2025

Club América

- Liga MX Femenil: Clausura 2023

Mexico U-17

- CONCACAF Women's U-17 Championship runners-up: 2018
- FIFA U-17 Women's World Cup runners-up: 2018

Mexico U-20

- CONCACAF Women's U-20 Championship runners-up: 2020

== Personal life ==
Alison's nickname is "Aligol." She has a twin sister.
