= Belén Cruz =

Mexican footballer (born 1998)

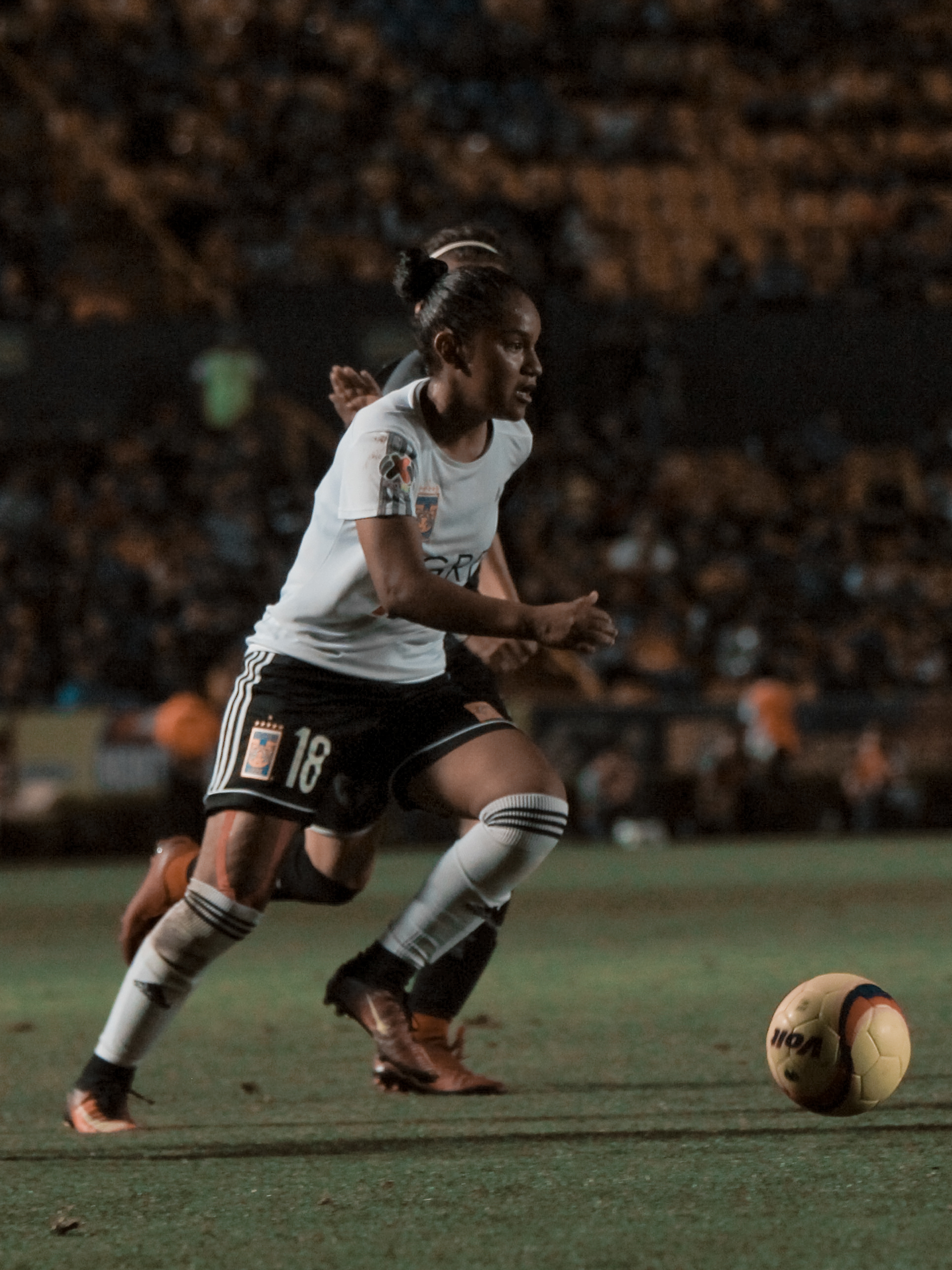
- Cruz in 2017

Personal information
- Full name: Belén De Jesús Cruz Arzate
- Date of birth: 7 November 1998 (age 27)
- Place of birth: Acapulco, Guerrero, Mexico
- Height: 1.59 m (5 ft 2 1/2 in)
- Position: Attacking midfielder

Team information
- Current team: Cruz Azul
- Number: 18

Senior career*
Years	Team	Apps	(Gls)
2017–2026	Tigres UANL	200	(61)
2026–	Cruz Azul	0	(0)

International career^{‡}
2014–2015	Mexico U17		
2015–2018	Mexico U20	3	(0)
2021–	Mexico	3	(0)
- * Club domestic league appearances and goals as of 2 September 2025 ‡ National team caps and goals as of 10 April 2021

Belén De Jesús Cruz Arzate (born 7 November 1998) is a Mexican professional football midfielder who currently plays for Liga Femenil club Cruz Azul.

== Honors and awards ==
Tigres UANL

- Liga MX Femenil: Clausura 2018, Clausura 2019, Guardianes 2020, Guardianes 2021, Apertura 2025

Mexico U17

- CONCACAF Women's U-17 Championship: 2013

Mexico U20

- CONCACAF Women's U-20 Championship: 2018
