= Lizbeth Ovalle =

Mexican footballer (born 1999)

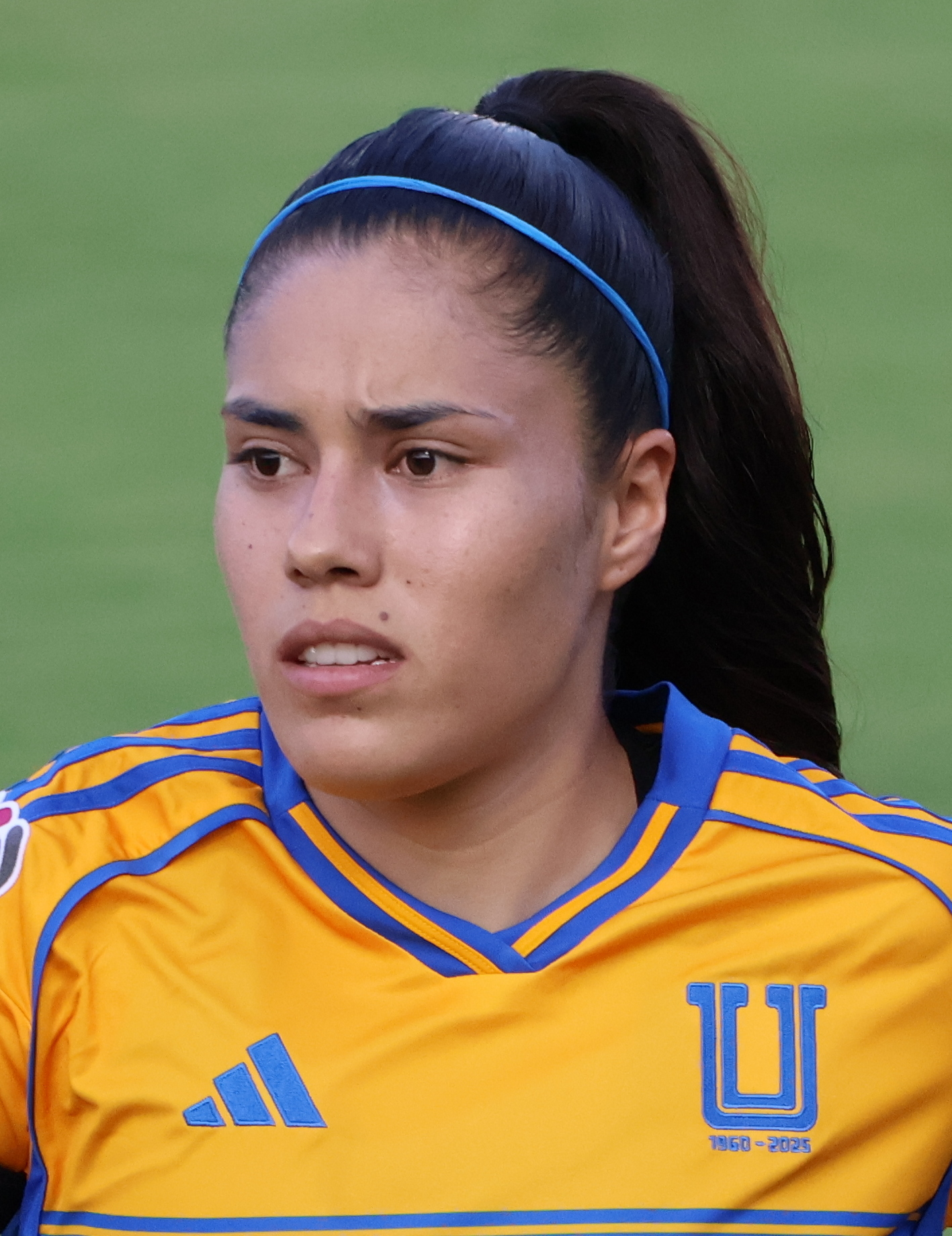
- Ovalle with Tigres UANL in 2025

Personal information
- Full name: Lizbeth Jaqueline Ovalle Muñoz
- Date of birth: 19 October 1999 (age 27)
- Place of birth: Aguascalientes, Mexico
- Height: 1.61 m (5 ft 3 in)
- Position: Winger

Team information
- Current team: Orlando Pride
- Number: 13

Senior career*
Years	Team	Apps	(Gls)
2017–2025	UANL	283	(133)
2025–	Orlando Pride	32	(4)

International career^{‡}
2016	Mexico U-17	9	(4)
2018	Mexico U-20	8	(5)
2018–	Mexico	66	(20)
Medal record
Women's football
Representing Mexico
Pan American Games
Gold medal – first place	2023 Santiago	Team
Central American and Caribbean Games
Gold medal – first place	2023 San Salvador
- * Club domestic league appearances and goals as of 03:27, 8 November 2026 (UTC) ‡ National team caps and goals as of 00:26, 13 October 2026 (UTC)

Lizbeth Jacqueline Ovalle Muñoz (born 19 October 1999), also known as Jacqueline Ovalle and nicknamed “La Maga” (The Magician), is a Mexican professional footballer who plays as a winger for Orlando Pride of the National Women's Soccer League (NWSL) and the Mexico national team.

Ovalle began her professional career with Tigres UANL in 2017, becoming the club's all-time leading goalscorer and winning six Liga MX Femenil championships. In August 2025, she transferred to Orlando Pride for a then-world-record fee of approximately US$1.5 million, becoming the most expensive women's football transfer at the time. Later that year, she won the 2025 FIFA Marta Award for a scorpion-kick goal scored against Guadalajara in March 2025. Internationally, she helped Mexico win gold at the 2023 Pan American Games and was named to the Best XI of the 2024 CONCACAF W Gold Cup.

== Club career ==
=== Tigres UANL ===
Ovalle started her professional career with Tigres UANL at age 17, signing with the Monterrey-based club just ahead of the start of the initial Liga MX Femenil tournament in July 2017. She quickly became a prominent player for Tigres, scoring six goals and playing more than 800 minutes during her debut tournament.

Ovalle would win her first trophy with Tigres during the Clausura 2018, playing an important role for the team throughout the tournament, but specially during the playoffs in which she scored two goals, including one in the second-leg of the final against city rivals Monterrey.

During her time with Tigres, Ovalle became a fundamental part of the team and on one of the best players in Liga MX Femenil, achieving more than 200 league appearances and scoring more than 100 goals, and helping Tigres win a significant number of trophies. Ovalle won the 2025 FIFA Marta Award for the best goal in women's football that year, a scorpion kick scored for Tigres against Guadalajara on 3 March 2025.

=== Orlando Pride ===
On 21 August 2025, Ovalle joined Orlando Pride of the National Women's Soccer League (NWSL) from Tigres UANL for a then-world-record women's football transfer fee of approximately US$1.5 million (£1.1 million). The transfer surpassed the record set by Olivia Smith's move from Liverpool to Arsenal the previous month. Ovalle signed a contract through the 2027 season, with a mutual option for 2028.

Ovalle made her NWSL debut on 7 September 2025, entering as a halftime substitute in a 5–2 defeat against Chicago Stars FC. On 13 September, she made her first league start and home debut against Bay FC, providing her first NWSL assist with a cross that Ally Watt headed in during a 1–1 draw. She scored her first NWSL goal on 26 September, opening the scoring in a 2–1 victory over San Diego Wave FC. The goal made her the first Mexican international to score for Orlando Pride.

During the remainder of the 2025 regular season, Ovalle made eight league appearances, including seven starts, recording one goal and two assists. She also started both of Orlando's playoff matches.

In the 2026 season, Ovalle scored her first goal of the campaign on 25 March in a 3–0 victory over Chicago Stars FC, finishing a cross from Solai Washington with a backheel. She also assisted Hannah Anderson's goal in the same match. On 27 September, she scored in second-half stoppage time to secure a 3–1 victory over Bay FC. Ovalle finished the 2026 NWSL regular season with three goals and three assists in 23 appearances.

== International career ==
=== Youth ===
Ovalle represented Mexico youth national teams at the 2016 CONCACAF Women's U-17 Championship, 2016 FIFA U-17 Women's World Cup, the 2018 CONCACAF Women's U-20 Championship and the 2018 FIFA U-20 Women's World Cup.

=== Senior ===
Ovalle made her senior international debut on 1 September 2018 during a friendly match against France. She netted her first goal with the senior team during a 2019 Cyprus Women's Cup match against Czech Republic. She was part of the roster that represented Mexico at the 2022 CONCACAF W Championship, in which she started in all three games that Mexico played during the tournament.

Ovalle was selected to represent Mexico at the 2023 Pan American Games held in Santiago, Chile, where the Mexican squad went undefeated to win the gold medal for the first time in their history at the Pan American Games, defeating Chile 1–0.

During the group stage of the 2024 CONCACAF W Gold Cup, Ovalle opened the score for Mexico in a 2–0 win against the United States, helping Mexico defeat the U.S. for the second time in team history.

== Career statistics ==
Scores and results list Mexico's goal tally first, score column indicates score after each Ovalle goal.

List of international goals scored by Lizbeth Ovalle
No.	Date	Venue	Opponent	Score	Result	Competition
1	6 March 2019	Antonis Papadopoulos Stadium, Larnaca, Cyprus	Czech Republic	1–0	2–1	2019 Cyprus Women's Cup
2	22 May 2019	Red Bull Training Facility, Hanover Township, United States	New Zealand	1–2	1–2	Friendly
3	6 August 2019	Estadio Universidad San Marcos, Lima, Peru	Panama	3–0	5–1	2019 Pan American Games
4	6 August 2019	Estadio Universidad San Marcos, Lima, Peru	Panama	5–1	5–1	2019 Pan American Games
5	19 April 2022	Estadio Nemesio Díez, Toluca, Mexico	Puerto Rico	1–0	6–0	2022 CONCACAF W Championship qualification
6	19 April 2022	Estadio Nemesio Díez, Toluca, Mexico	Puerto Rico	4–0	6–0	2022 CONCACAF W Championship qualification
7	5 July 2023	Estadio Las Delicias, Santa Tecla, El Salvador	Guatemala	3–0	6–0	2023 Central American and Caribbean Games
8	28 October 2023	Estadio Sausalito, Viña del Mar, Chile	Paraguay	4–1	4–1	2023 Pan American Games
9	31 October 2023	Estadio Elías Figueroa Brander, Valparaíso, Chile	Argentina	1–0	2–0	2023 Pan American Games
10	31 October 2023	Estadio Elías Figueroa Brander, Valparaíso, Chile	Argentina	2–0	2–0	2023 Pan American Games
11	23 February 2024	Dignity Health Sports Park, Carson, United States	Dominican Republic	2–0	8–0	2024 CONCACAF W Gold Cup
12	23 February 2024	Dignity Health Sports Park, Carson, United States	Dominican Republic	4–0	8–0	2024 CONCACAF W Gold Cup
13	26 February 2024	Dignity Health Sports Park, Carson, United States	United States	1–0	2–0	2024 CONCACAF W Gold Cup
14	3 March 2024	BMO Stadium, Los Angeles, United States	Paraguay	1–0	3–2	2024 CONCACAF W Gold Cup
15	3 March 2024	BMO Stadium, Los Angeles, United States	Paraguay	3–1	3–2	2024 CONCACAF W Gold Cup
16	4 June 2024	BMO Field, Toronto, Canada	Canada	1–1	1–1	Friendly
17	25 February 2025	Pinatar Arena, San Pedro del Pinatar, Spain	China	2–0	2–0	2025 Pinatar Cup
18	8 April 2025	Shell Energy Stadium, Houston, United States	Jamaica	1–0	4–0	Friendly
19	9 October 2026	Estadio Victoria, Aguascalientes, Mexico	Jamaica	1–2	3–4	Friendly
20	13 October 2026	Estadio Corregidora, Querétaro, Mexico	Jamaica	3–0	3–1	Friendly

== Honours ==
UANL

- Liga MX Femenil (6): Clausura 2018, Clausura 2019, Apertura 2020, Clausura 2021, Apertura 2022, Apertura 2023
- Campeón de Campeonas: 2021, 2023, 2024

Mexico U20

- CONCACAF Women's U-20 Championship: 2018

Mexico

- Pan American Games gold medal: 2023

Individual

- FIFA U-20 Women's World Cup Goal of the tournament: 2018
- CONCACAF W Gold Cup Best XI: 2024
- FIFA Marta Award: 2025
