= Carolina Jaramillo =

Mexican footballer (born 1994)

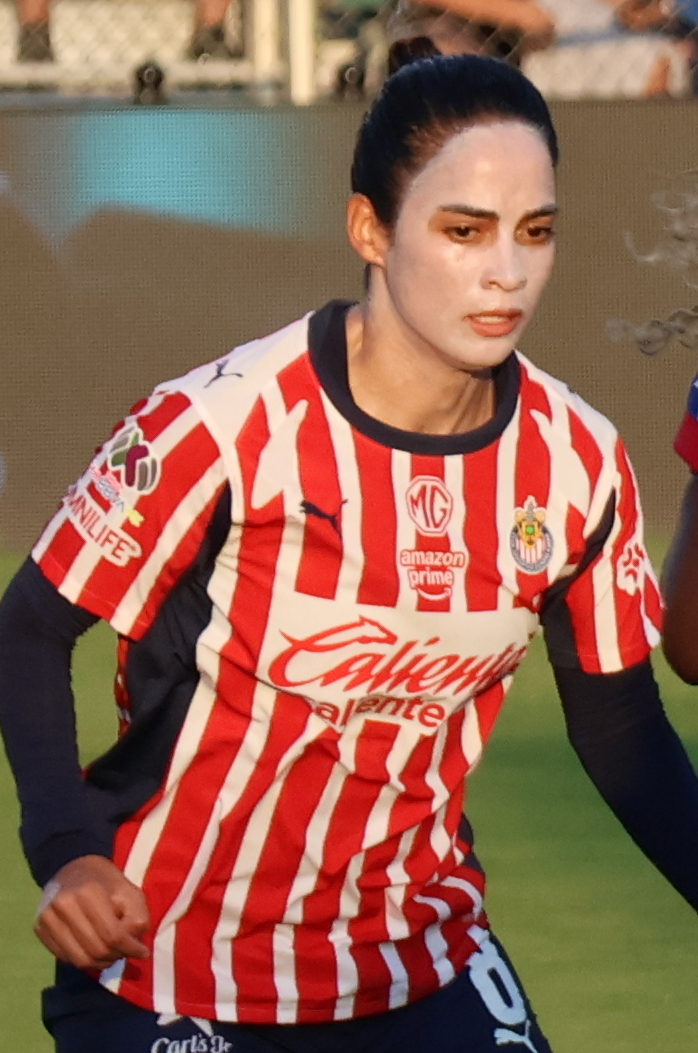
- Jaramillo with Guadalajara in 2025

Personal information
- Full name: Christian Carolina Jaramillo Quintero
- Date of birth: 19 March 1994 (age 32)
- Place of birth: Tijuana, Baja California, Mexico
- Height: 1.66 m (5 ft 5 1/2 in)
- Position: Attacking midfielder

Team information
- Current team: Guadalajara
- Number: 8

Senior career*
Years	Team	Apps	(Gls)
2017	Tijuana	3	(3)
2017–2020	UANL	50	(16)
2020–	Guadalajara	171	(50)

International career
2012–2013	Mexico U-17		
2013–2014	Mexico U-20		
2017–	Mexico	5	(2)
Medal record
Women's football
Representing Mexico
Central American and Caribbean Games
Gold medal – first place	2023 San Salvador
- * Club domestic league appearances and goals as of 31 January 2026

Christian Carolina Jaramillo Quintero (born 19 March 1994) is a Mexican professional footballer who plays as a midfielder for Liga MX Femenil club Guadalajara.

She played for the Mexico national team in a 2017 friendly against Costa Rica.

== International goals ==
No.	Date	Venue	Opponent	Score	Result	Competition
1.	17 February 2022	Estadio Universitario, San Nicolás de los Garza, Mexico	Suriname	7–0	9–0	2022 CONCACAF W Championship qualification
2.	20 February 2022	Estadio Olímpico Félix Sánchez, Santo Domingo, Dominican Republic	Antigua and Barbuda	7–0	8–0	2022 CONCACAF W Championship qualification
3.	25 June 2022	Estadio Corona, Torreón, Mexico	Peru	3–1	5–1	Friendly
4.	25 June 2022	Estadio Corona, Torreón, Mexico	Peru	4–1	5–1	Friendly

== Honours ==
UANL

- Liga MX Femenil: Clausura 2018
- Liga MX Femenil: Clausura 2019
- Liga MX Femenil: Clausura 2022
