= Blanca Solís =

Mexican footballer (born 1996)

Personal information
- Full name: Blanca María Solís Rodas
- Date of birth: 30 April 1996 (age 30)
- Place of birth: Tuxtla Gutiérrez, Chiapas, Mexico
- Height: 1.73 m (5 ft 8 in)
- Position: Forward

Team information
- Current team: Juárez
- Number: 23

Senior career*
Years	Team	Apps	(Gls)
2017–2022	UANL	77	(14)
2022–2025	Juárez	41	(11)

International career
2014–2015	Mexico U-17		
2015–2016	Mexico U-20		
- * Club domestic league appearances and goals as of 18 October 2017

Blanca María Solís Rodas (born 30 April 1996) is a Mexican professional football forward who currently plays for Juárez of the Liga MX Femenil.

== Honours ==
UANL

- Liga MX Femenil: Clausura 2018
- Liga MX Femenil: Clausura 2019
