= Osvaldo Batocletti =

Argentine-Mexican footballer and manager (1950–2019)

Personal information
- Full name: Osvaldo Agustín Batocletti Ronco
- Date of birth: January 22, 1950
- Place of birth: San Nicolás de los Arroyos, Buenos Aires, Argentina
- Date of death: May 17, 2019 (aged 69)
- Place of death: Monterrey, Nuevo León, Mexico
- Height: 1.81 m (5 ft 11 1/2 in)
- Position: Defender

Senior career*
Years	Team	Apps	(Gls)
1967–1972	Racing Club	34	(2)
1973	Lanús		
1974	Unión de Santa Fe		
1974–1977	Club León	69	(2)
1977–1984	Tigres UANL	234	(12)

Managerial career
- 1999: Tigres UANL
- 2004: Querétaro
- 2005: Tigres UANL
- 2009–2010: Irapuato
- 2017–2018: Tigres UANL (Women)
- 2018: Tigres UANL (Women) (assistant)
- * Club domestic league appearances and goals as of February 2008

Osvaldo Agustín Batocletti Ronco (Note: In this name that follows Hispanic American naming customs, the first or paternal surname is Batocletti and the second or maternal family name is Ronco.) (January 22, 1950 – May 17, 2019), known by audience and fans as "Bato", was an Argentine football player and later manager, who played as a defender. He most notably played for and coached Tigres UANL.

Having resided in Mexico from 1974, he held Mexican citizenship. He died there, from cancer, in 2019, at the age of 69.

== Career ==
=== Player ===
Batocletti started his career playing with Racing Club de Avellaneda in 1970. In 1973, he moved to Club Atlético Lanús, and then in 1974 he moved to Unión de Santa Fe.

In 1974, he moved to Mexico to play with Club León of the Mexican Primera División, now Liga MX. In 1977, he was transferred to Tigres de la UANL. For his transfer to Tigres, Batocletti sacrificed part of his salary so that Tigres could pay León. With Tigres, he scored 12 goals and was League champion twice, in 1978 and in 1982. Along with Gerónimo Barbadillo, Tomás Boy and coach Carlos Miloc, he is considered an icon of Tigres' first golden age of success. After playing 7 seasons with Tigres, he retired as a player in 1984.

Since retirement, he was attached to Tigres, mostly in administrative positions. He was labeled by Monterrey daily, El Norte, as the "El Tigre más Tigre" (most Tiger of all Tigers), because his extensive career with Tigres and his affection to the team.

=== Coach ===
As a coach of Tigres UANL, in quarter-finals of play-offs of the Apertura 2005 season, Tigres played the historical "Aztecazo", a way to describe a difficult victory over Club América or the Mexico national football team in their venue, the Estadio Azteca. In the first game, Tigres lost in the Estadio Universitario by a 1–3 score. Against all odds, however, they defeated América in the second game 4–1 for an aggregate scoreline of 5–4, leaving América out of the postseason. In the semi-finals, Tigres drew rival CF Monterrey after 1–0 and 1–2 (2–2) scorelines, although Monterrey progressed to the next round because of the points in the tournament. Batocletti also coached Querétaro F.C. without success. He also coached the female section of Tigres UANL where he led them to the Clausura 2018 title.

== Honours ==
=== Player ===
UANL

- Mexican Primera División: 1977–78, 1981–82

=== Manager ===
UANL Women

- Liga MX Femenil: Clausura 2018
