= Nancy Antonio =

Mexican footballer (born 1996)

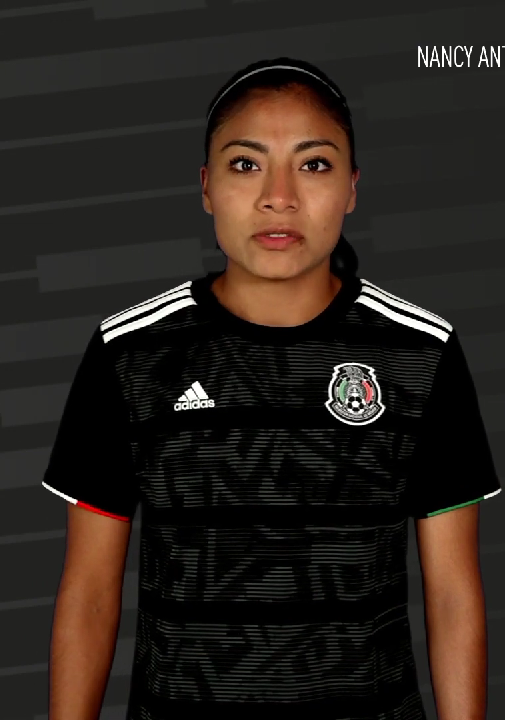
- Antonio in 2018

Personal information
- Full name: Nancy Guadalupe Antonio López
- Date of birth: 2 April 1996 (age 30)
- Place of birth: Mexico City, Mexico
- Height: 1.74 m (5 ft 8 1/2 in)
- Position: Defensive midfielder

Team information
- Current team: América
- Number: 18

Senior career*
Years	Team	Apps	(Gls)
2017–2024	UANL	241	(21)
2024–	América	84	(12)

International career^{‡}
2014–2015	Mexico U-17		
2015–2016	Mexico U-20		
2015–	Mexico	24	(1)
- * Club domestic league appearances and goals as of 24 May 2026 ‡ National team caps and goals as of 10 April 2021

Nancy Guadalupe Antonio López (born 2 April 1996) is a Mexican professional football midfielder who plays for Liga MX Femenil side Club América Femenil.

== Career ==
She played for the Mexico national team at the Toronto 2015 Pan American Games and 2019 Lima Pan American Games. She scored a goal for Mexico in a 3–2 loss to Canada in a 2017 friendly. She also played for Mexico in a 2017 friendly against Sweden.

== Honours ==
MEXICO

- Toronto 2015 Pan American Games: Bronze Medal

Tigres UANL

- Clausura 2018 Liga MX Femenil Champion
- Clausura 2019 Liga MX Femenil Champion
- Guardianes 2020 Liga MX Femenil Champion
- Guardianes 2021 Liga MX Femenil Champion
- Campeón de Campeones 2020-2021 Champion
- Apertura 2022 Liga MX Femenil Champion
- Campeón de Campeones 2022-2023 Champion
- Apertura 2023 Liga MX Femenil Champion

Club América

- Liga MX Femenil: Clausura 2026
- CONCACAF W Champions Cup: 2025–26
