= Liliana Mercado =

Mexican footballer (born 1988)

Personal information
- Full name: Liliana Mercado Fuentes
- Date of birth: 22 October 1988 (age 38)
- Place of birth: Atlacomulco, State of Mexico, Mexico
- Height: 1.65 m (5 ft 5 in)
- Position: Defensive midfielder

Team information
- Current team: Juárez
- Number: 8

Senior career*
Years	Team	Apps	(Gls)
2017–2024	Tigres UANL	229	(28)
2024–	Juárez	45	(7)

International career^{‡}
2010–	Mexico	24	(1)
- * Club domestic league appearances and goals as of 7 September 2023 ‡ National team caps and goals as of 24 November 2013

Liliana Mercado Fuentes (born 22 October 1988) is a Mexican footballer who plays as a midfielder for Liga MX Femenil club FC Juárez.

She has also been capped for the Mexico national team.

== Honours ==
UANL

- Liga MX Femenil: Clausura 2018
- Liga MX Femenil: Clausura 2019
