= Jazmín Enrigue =

Mexican footballer (born 2000)

Personal information
- Full name: Jazmín Enrigue Abundis
- Date of birth: May 9, 2000 (age 26)
- Place of birth: Guadalajara, Jalisco, Mexico
- Height: 1.59 m (5 ft 2 1/2 in)
- Position: Defensive midfielder

Team information
- Current team: Tijuana
- Number: 3

Senior career*
Years	Team	Apps	(Gls)
2017–2020	UANL	42	(5)
2020–2024	Querétaro	56	(4)
2024	Tampa Bay Sun	1	(0)
2025–	Tijuana	37	(2)

International career
2015–2016	Mexico U17		
2016	Mexico U20		
- * Club domestic league appearances and goals as of 9 February 2026

Jazmín Enrigue Abundis (born 9 May 2000) is a Mexican professional footballer who plays as a defender for Liga MX Femenil club Tijuana.

== Club career ==
Enrigue joined the Tampa Bay Sun in June 2024, ahead of the inaugural USL Super League season.

Enrigue moved to Tijuana in January 2025.

== Honours and awards ==
Tigres UANL

- Liga MX Femenil: Clausura 2018
- Liga MX Femenil: Clausura 2019

Individual

- Liga MX Femenil Team of The Season: Apertura 2017
