= Tigres UANL (women) =

Tigres UANL Femenil
- Full name: Club de Fútbol Tigres de la Universidad Autónoma de Nuevo León Femenil
- Nicknames: Las Amazonas (The Amazons); La U de Nuevo León (The U of Nuevo León); Las Auriazules (The Golden-blue ones)
- Founded: December 5, 2016; 9 years ago
- Ground: Estadio Universitario; San Nicolás de los Garza, Nuevo León
- Capacity: 41,886
- Owner(s): UANL; CEMEX (through Sinergia Deportiva)
- Manager: Pedro Martínez Losa
- League: Liga Femenil
- Clausura 2026: Regular phase: 3rd Final phase: Quarter-finals
Home colours	Away colours

Tigres UANL Femenil, also known simply as Tigres Femenil or Tigres, is a Mexican professional women's football club based in San Nicolás de los Garza, Nuevo León that competes in the Liga Femenil. The club has been the women's section of Tigres UANL since 2016. The team plays its home matches at the Estadio Universitario.

Commonly known as Las Amazonas (The Amazons), Tigres Femenil is one of only five clubs that have won the Liga Femenil title, and the most successful one with a record seven league titles, two more than their city rivals Monterrey.

== History ==
=== Founding and first league tournament ===
Club de Fútbol Tigres de la Universidad Autónoma de Nuevo León Femenil was founded on December 5, 2016, the same day that the Liga MX Femenil was announced. In preparation for the first season of the Liga MX Femenil in the second half of 2017, the team participated in a preparation tournament, the 2017 Copa MX Femenil under the management of Miguel Razo. On July 13, 2017, previous to the start of the league, former Tigres player and club legend, Osvaldo Batocletti, was appointed as manager of the team with the previous manager Miguel Razo becoming his assistant. Tigres Femenil's first league match in history was a 0–0 draw against Querétaro on July 29, 2017.

In its first Liga MX Femenil tournament (Apertura 2017), Tigres ended the regular phase of the tournament in 2nd with 34 points, but they would eventually be eliminated in the semifinals of the play-offs by Pachuca.

=== First title and continuous success ===
Tigres Femenil obtained its first league title by winning the Torneo Clausura 2018. For this tournament, Tigres ended the regular phase of the tournament in 3rd place with 31 points. In the semifinals of the playoffs, Tigres defeated América with an aggregate scoreline of 5–1 to advance to the final against their crosstown rivals Monterrey which would be the first of many Clásico Regiomontano finals in the Liga MX Femenil. Tigres would end up defeating Monterrey in the final on penalties (2–4) after a 4–4 draw on aggregate. The second leg of this final at the Estadio BBVA was at the time the highest attended club match in women's football history.

On May 7, 2018, just a few days after the Clausura 2018 final, Osvaldo Batocletti decided to step down from the position of manager in order to receive treatment for a Cancer. Ramón Villa Zevallos was appointed by the club to take over the position of manager with Batocletti becoming his assistant.

Under Villa Zevallos' management, the team once again reached the league final in the Apertura 2018 tournament after finishing in 1st place in the regular phase with 40 points. In the playoffs Tigres eliminated Atlas in the quarter-finals (2–1), and Guadalajara (5–3) the semifinals. In the final, Tigres was defeated by América on penalties (1–3) after a 3–3 draw on aggregate.

In the Clausura 2019, Tigres ended the regular phase of the tournament in 3rd place with 36 points. In the playoffs, Tigres was once again able to reach the final. In the final Tigres defeated Monterrey once again with an aggregate scoreline of 3–2 to crown themselves league champions for the second time.

Ramón Villa Zevallos left his position of manager on May 30, 2019, just after one season in order to take the position of manager of C.D. Guadalajara. The club announced former Mexico women's national football team manager, Roberto Medina, as the new manager of the team on May 31, 2019.

With Medina at the helm, the team once again reach the league final in the Apertura 2019 after ending the regular phase of the tournament in 2nd place with 43 points. In the final, Tigres once again faced Monterrey on the third Clásico Regiomontano femenil final. Unlike in the previous two finals, Monterrey was able to win this final after defeating Tigres 2–1 on aggregate.

On October 5, 2019, Tigres hosted the first ever international friendly between clubs from the Liga MX Femenil and the NWSL when it played against Houston Dash in the Estadio Universitario. Tigres won that match 2–1.

Although the Clausura 2020 tournament was canceled by the league due to the COVID-19 pandemic, Tigres Femenil's successful run continued in the Guard1anes 2020 and Guard1anes 2021 tournaments in which Tigres was able to win both tournaments back to back after defeating Monterrey and Guadalajara, respectively. By doing this, Tigres Femenil became the first team in the league to be able to win back-to back league titles. By winning the titles of the Guard1anes 2020 and Guard1anes 2021 tournaments, Tigres also automatically won the first edition of the Campeón de Campeonas of the Liga MX Femenil.

In the Apertura 2021, Tigres once again reach the league final for the seventh consecutive time. In the final, Tigres was defeated for the second time by Monterrey by losing (1–3) on penalties after 2–2 draw on aggregate.

In the Clausura 2022, Tigres was eliminated in the semi-finals of the playoffs by Guadalajara, ending a run of seven consecutive league finals.

A few weeks following Tigres elimination in the playoffs of the Clausura 2022, the club decided to sack manager Roberto Medina on June 2, 2022, after more than three years at the role. During Medina's tenure the team obtained 3 titles and reach 4 league finals. Former Canadian international player Carmelina Moscato was appointed as manager of the team on June 9, 2022. After winning the 2022–23 Apertura with Tigres and finishing in the semi-finals of the Clausura Liguilla, Moscato resigned from Tigres.

Milagros Martínez succeeded Moscato as manager, and she led Tigres to the Apertura 2023 title and the 2024 Campeón de Campeonas. However, in the Apertura 2024 final against Monterrey, Tigres collapsed in the 2nd leg after being up 3-0 on aggregate going in to the 2nd half of the game, losing the final on penalties. Martínez was ultimately fired following this result.

Pedro Martínez Losa was named as new manager December 20, 2024. In his first season, Tigres failed to make it to the semifinals of the Clausura 2025, but did advance to the final of the inaugural Concacaf W Champions Cup. In the final, Tigres fell short to NWSL side Gotham FC despite playing the match at home in Monterrey, Nuevo León.

Following a busy transfer window that included the arrivals of Diana Ordoñez and María Sánchez (2nd stint), as well as the world-record transfer of star forward Lizbeth Ovalle to NWSL's Orlando Pride for over MXN$1 million, Tigres won the Apertura 2025 title after defeating América in the final 4-3 on aggregate, despite going down 3 goals in the first half of the first leg.

== Grounds ==
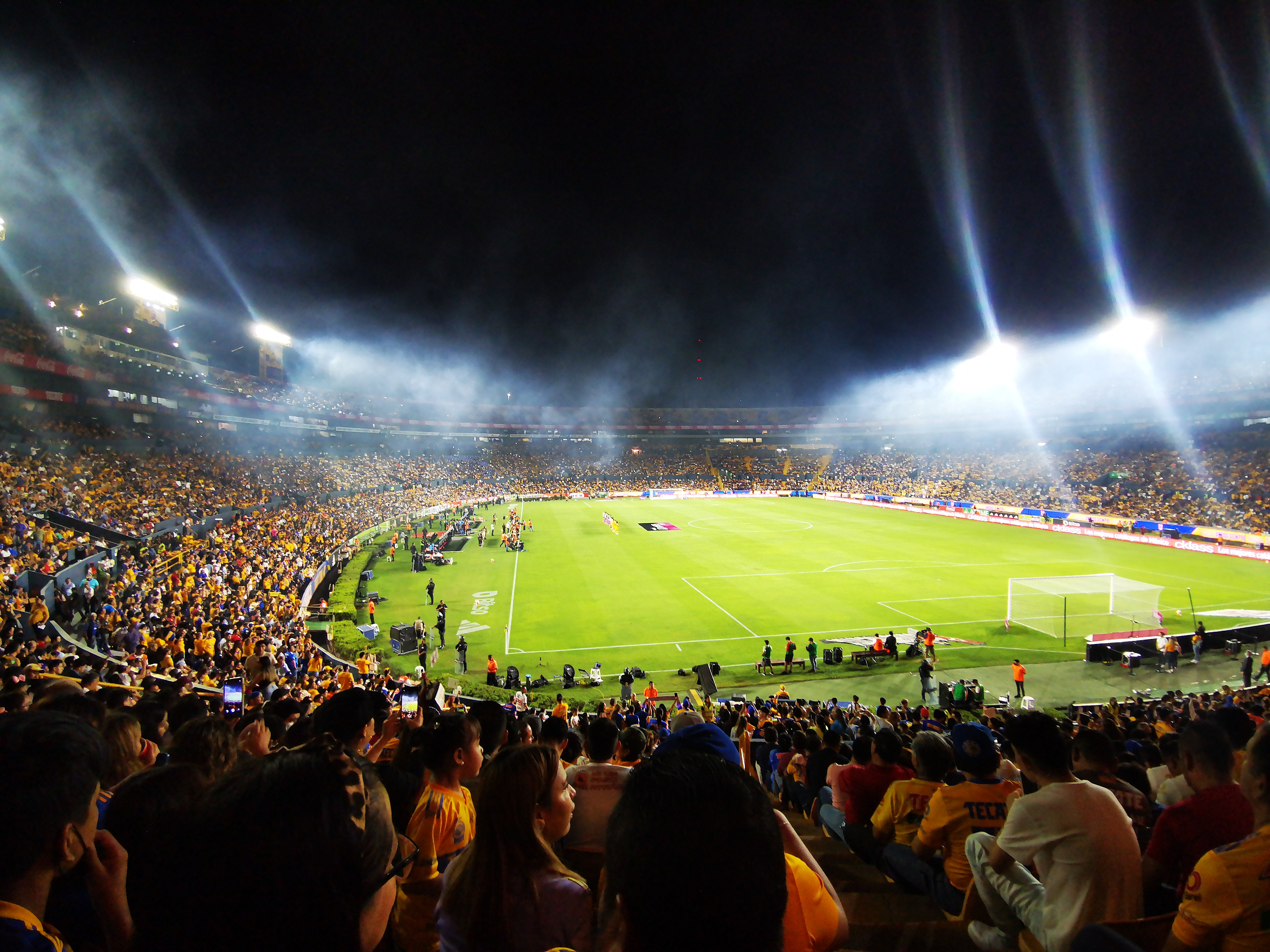
Estadio Universitario during the Apertura 2022 semi-final between Tigres Femenil and Monterrey.

The Estadio Universitario ("University Stadium") is the official home ground of Tigres Femenil. This 42,000-seat stadium built in 1967 is colloquially known as El Volcán ("The Volcano"). The stadium is located at the campus of the Autonomous University of Nuevo León in the city of San Nicolás de los Garza, Nuevo León.

Tigres Femenil play its first match in history at the Universitario on August 5, 2017, in a game against Guadalajara for match day 2 of the Apertura 2017. The match ended in a 2–0 victory for Tigres Femenil with goals from Blanca Solís and Carolina Jaramillo.

== Personnel ==
=== Club administration ===
Position	Staff
Chairman	(Mexico) Carlos Emilio González
President of the Sinergia Deportiva Liaison Sporting Committee (Cemex-UANL management joint venture)	(Mexico) Mauricio Doehner
Sporting Director	(Colombia) Natalia Gaitán

Source: Club Tigres

=== Coaching staff ===
Position	Staff
Manager	(Spain) Pedro Martínez Losa
Assistant managers	(Spain) Javier Vázquez (Mexico) José Curiel
Fitness coach	(Spain) Mireia Encina
Team doctor	(Mexico) Rocío Zapata
Physiotherapist	(Mexico) Diana González

Source: Liga MX Femenil

== Players ==
=== Current squad ===
As of 14 September 2026

Note: Flags indicate national team as defined under FIFA eligibility rules; some limited exceptions apply. Players may hold more than one non-FIFA nationality.

No.	Pos.	Nation	Player
1	GK	MEX	Cecilia Santiago
2	DF	MEX	Maria Inés González
3	DF	MEX	Mia Villalpando
4	DF	MEX	Greta Espinoza
5	MF	GHA	Grace Asantewaa
6	DF	MEX	Jimena López
7	MF	MEX	María Sánchez
8	MF	MEX	Alexia Delgado
9	MF	MEX	Stephany Mayor
10	FW	VEN	Deyna Castellanos
11	FW	BRA	Jheniffer
12	FW	MEX	Diana Ordóñez
13	MF	MEX	Talia Coury
14	FW	MEX	Myra Delgadillo

No.	Pos.	Nation	Player
16	FW	RSA	Thembi Kgatlana
17	DF	USA	Sabrina Enciso
18	DF	GHA	Susan Ama Duah
19	FW	MEX	Tatiana Flores
20	DF	BRA	Mariza
21	MF	COL	Ilana Izquierdo
22	DF	MEX	Anika Rodríguez
23	GK	MEX	Itzel González
24	MF	MEX	Maricarmen Reyes
30	FW	MEX	Alison González
32	DF	MEX	Natalia Muñoz
33	GK	MEX	Hannia de Ávila
34	FW	MEX	Deiry Ramírez
35	MF	MEX	Angélica Antonio

=== Out on loan ===
No. / Pos. / Nation / Player; — / DF / MEX / Cristina Ferral (at Guadalajara)	No. / Pos. / Nation / Player; — / DF / MEX / Natalia Colin (at Guadalajara)

== Managerial history ==
Manager	Years
(Mexico) Miguel Razo	2017
(Argentina) Osvaldo Batocletti	2017–2018
(Mexico) Ramón Villa Zevallos	2018–2019
(Mexico) Roberto Medina	2019–2022
(Canada) Carmelina Moscato	2022–2023
(Spain) Mila Martínez	2023–2024
(Spain) Pedro Martínez Losa	2025–

== Seasons ==
Season	Tournament	League record									Playoffs record								Top goalscorer	
Season	Tournament	P	W	D	L	GF	GA	GD	Pts	Rank	P	W	D	L	GF	GA	GD	Result	Player	Goals
2017–18	Apertura 2017	14	11	1	2	51	7	+44	34	2nd	2	1	0	1	3	4	−1	SF	(Mexico) Carolina Jaramillo	9
2017–18	Clausura 2018	14	10	1	3	38	16	+22	31	3rd	4	1	2	1	8	6	+2	W	(Mexico) Belén Cruz	9
2018–19	Apertura 2018	16	12	4	0	51	19	+32	40	1st	6	3	3	0	10	7	+3	RU	(Mexico) Katty Martínez	13
2018–19	Clausura 2019	16	11	3	2	36	12	+24	36	3rd	6	5	1	0	12	4	+8	W	(Mexico) Katty Martínez	11
2019–20	Apertura 2019	18	13	4	1	41	14	+27	43	2nd	6	2	2	2	9	5	+4	RU	(Mexico) Katty Martínez	13
2019–20	Clausura 2020	8	7	1	0	22	5	+17	22	1st (Note: On 22 May 2020, the Clausura tournament was canceled due to the COVID-19 pandemic; in that moment UANL was ranked first.)	Tournament canceled								(Mexico) Stephany Mayor	6
2020–21	Guardianes 2020	17	15	1	1	50	11	+39	46	1st	6	5	0	1	11	3	+8	W	(Mexico) Katty Martínez	18
2020–21	Guardianes 2021	17	12	4	1	39	12	+27	40	1st	6	5	1	0	19	7	+12	W	(Mexico) Stephany Mayor	10
2021–22	Apertura 2021	17	15	2	0	52	7	+45	47	1st	6	3	2	1	15	4	+11	RU	(Mexico) Stephany Mayor	13
2021–22	Clausura 2022	17	11	6	0	43	11	+32	39	3rd	4	3	0	1	11	3	+8	SF	(Mexico) Stephany Mayor	11
2022–23	Apertura 2022	17	12	2	3	48	13	+35	38	3rd	6	5	1	0	15	4	+11	W	(United States) Mia Fishel	17
2022–23	Clausura 2023	17	12	2	3	48	13	+35	38	2nd	4	2	0	2	7	2	+5	SF	(United States) Mia Fishel	13

== Records ==
=== Most goals ===
#	Player	Goals (Note: includes Liga MX Femenil regular season and playoffs.)
1	(Mexico) Katty Martínez	93
2	(Mexico) Belén Cruz	36
2	(Mexico) Lizbeth Ovalle	36
4	(Mexico) Liliana Mercado	22
5	(Mexico) Carolina Jaramillo	18

=== Most appearances ===
#	Player	Apps (Note: includes Liga MX Femenil regular season and playoffs.)	Career
1	(Mexico) Liliana Mercado	116	2017–2024
2	(Mexico) Nancy Antonio	111	2017–2024
3	(Mexico) Belén Cruz	110	2017–
4	(Mexico) Greta Espinoza	96	2018–
5	(Mexico) Katty Martínez	95	2017–2021

== Honours ==
=== National ===
- Liga MX Femenil
  - Champions (7): Clausura 2018, Clausura 2019, Guardianes 2020, Guardianes 2021, Apertura 2022, Apertura 2023, Apertura 2025
  - Runners-up (4): Apertura 2018, Apertura 2019, Apertura 2021, Apertura 2024
- Campeón de Campeonas
  - Champions (3): 2021, 2023, 2024

=== International ===
- CONCACAF W Champions Cup
  - Runners-up (1): 2024–25
