= 2021–22 Liga MX Femenil season =

Mexican women's football league season

Liga MX Femenil
- Season: 2021–22
- Champions: Apertura: Monterrey (2nd title); Clausura: Guadalajara (2nd title)
- Matches: 306
- Goals: 880 (2.88 per match)
- Top goalscorer: Apertura: Alicia Cervantes (17 goals); Clausura: Alicia Cervantes (14 goals)
- Biggest home win: Apertura: UANL 8–1 Necaxa (2 August 2021); Clausura: UANL 6–0 León (21 March 2022)
- Biggest away win: Apertura: León 1–6 Santos Laguna (23 August 2021); Necaxa 1–6 Monterrey (16 October 2021); Clausura: Atlético San Luis 0–6 UANL (27 March 2022)
- Highest scoring: Apertura: UANL 8–1 Necaxa (2 August 2021); Santos Laguna 5–4 Guadalajara (12 September 2021); Clausura: Monterrey 5–2 UNAM (7 February 2022); Atlas 6–1 Tijuana (5 March 2022); Monterrey 5–2 Necaxa (14 March 2022)
- Longest winning run: Apertura:12 matches UANL; Clausura:10 matches Monterrey
- Longest unbeaten run: Apertura:17 matches UANL; Clausura:17 matches Guadalajara; UANL
- Longest winless run: Apertura:11 matches Mazatlán; Clausura:10 matches Tijuana
- Longest losing run: Apertura:6 matches Juárez; Clausura:8 matches Juárez
- Highest attendance: Apertura:25,406; UANL vs Monterrey (9 October 2021); Clausura:31,098; Monterrey vs UANL (25 April 2022)
- Lowest attendance: Apertura:10; Atlas vs Pachuca (13 November 2021); Clausura:45; Cruz Azul vs Tijuana (26 February 2022)
- Total attendance: Apertura:181,007; Clausura:231,060
- Average attendance: Apertura:1,708; Clausura:1,639
- Stats are from the regular phase only Source: Liga MX Femenil

The 2021–22 Liga MX Femenil season was the fifth season of the premier women's football league in Mexico. The season began on 16 July 2021 and finished on 30 May 2022.

== Stadiums and locations ==
América	Atlas	Atlético San Luis	Cruz Azul	Guadalajara
Estadio Azteca	Estadio Jalisco	Estadio Alfonso Lastras	Estadio Azteca	Estadio Akron
Capacity: 81,070	Capacity: 55,110	Capacity: 25,111	Capacity: 81,070	Capacity: 46,232
Juárez	León	Mazatlán	Monterrey	Necaxa
Estadio Olímpico Benito Juárez	Estadio León	Estadio de Mazatlán	Estadio BBVA	Estadio Victoria
Capacity: 19,703	Capacity: 31,297	Capacity: 25,000	Capacity: 51,348	Capacity: 23,851
Pachuca	Puebla	Querétaro	Santos Laguna	Tijuana
Estadio Hidalgo	Estadio Cuauhtémoc	Estadio Corregidora	Estadio Corona	Estadio Caliente
Capacity: 27,512	Capacity: 51,726	Capacity: 33,162	Capacity: 29,237	Capacity: 27,333
Toluca	UANL	UNAM		
Estadio Nemesio Díez	Estadio Universitario	Estadio Olímpico Universitario		
Capacity: 31,000	Capacity: 41,886	Capacity: 48,297		

== Alternate venues ==
- América – Cancha Centenario No. 5 (Capacity: 1,000)
- Atlas – Estadio Colomos Alfredo 'Pistache' Torres (Capacity: 3,000)
- Atlas – CECAF (Capacity: 1,000)
- Cruz Azul – Instalaciones La Noria (Capacity: 2,000)
- Guadalajara – Verde Valle (Capacity: 800)
- León – La Esmeralda Cancha Sintética (Capacity: 1,000)
- Mazatlán – Centro Deportivo Benito Juárez (Capacity: 1,000)
- Monterrey – El Barrial (Capacity: 570)
- Querétaro - Estadio Olímpico Alameda (Capacity: 4,600)
- Toluca – Instalaciones Metepec (Capacity: 1,000)
- UANL – Instalaciones Zuazua (Capacity: 800)
- UNAM – La Cantera (Capacity: 2,000)
Location of the 2021–22 Liga MX Femenil teams
Location of the 2021–22 Liga MX Femenil teams in Greater Mexico City

== Personnel and kits ==
Team	Chairman	Head coach	Kit manufacturer	Shirt sponsor(s)
América	Emilio Azcárraga Jean	(England) Craig Harrington	Nike	AT&T
Atlas	José Riestra	(Mexico) Alejandro Rosales	Charly	
Atlético San Luis	Alberto Marrero	(Mexico) Jesús Padrón Pérez	Pirma	Canel's
Cruz Azul	Jaime Ordiales	(Mexico) Carlos Roberto Pérez	Joma	Cemento Cruz Azul
Guadalajara	Amaury Vergara	(Mexico) Juan Pablo Alfaro	Puma	Sello Rojo
Juárez	Miguel Ángel Garza	(Mexico) Ana Cristina González	Sporelli	S-Mart
León	Jesús Martínez Murguia	(Mexico) Adrián Martínez	Charly	Cementos Fortaleza
Mazatlán	Mauricio Lanz González	(Mexico) Juan Carlos Mendoza	Pirma	Banco Azteca
Monterrey	José González Ornelas	(Mexico) Eva Espejo	Puma	BBVA
Necaxa	Ernesto Tinajero Flores	(Mexico) Gerardo Castillo	Pirma	Rolcar
Pachuca	Armando Martínez Patiño	(Mexico) Juan Carlos Cacho	Charly	Cementos Fortaleza
Puebla	Manuel Jiménez García	(Mexico) Pablo Luna	Umbro	Banco Azteca
Querétaro	José Antonio Núñez	(Mexico) Carla Rossi	Charly	Pedigree Petfoods
Santos Laguna	Dante Elizalde	(Mexico) Jorge Campos	Charly	Soriana
Tijuana	Jorge Hank Inzunsa	(Mexico) Fabiola Vargas	Charly	Caliente
Toluca	Francisco Suinaga	(Mexico) Gabriel Velasco	Under Armour	arabela
UANL	Mauricio Culebro	(Mexico) Roberto Medina	Adidas	Cemex
UNAM	Leopoldo Silva Gutiérrez	(Mexico) Karina Báez	Nike	DHL Express

== Format ==
- The Liga MX Femenil season is split into two championships: the Torneo Grita México 2021 (opening tournament) and the Torneo Clausura 2022 (closing tournament). Each is contested in an identical format and includes the same eighteen teams.
- Since 2019–20 season the teams compete in a single group, the best eight of the general table qualify to the championship playoffs.

== Torneo Apertura ==
The 2021 Torneo Apertura, officially named Torneo Grita México Apertura 2021, is the first tournament of the season. The tournament was renamed Torneo Grita México 2021 with the intention of fighting homophobia derived from a scream used by fans. The tournament began on 16 July 2021.

=== Regular season ===
==== Standings ====
Pos	Team	Pld	W	D	L	GF	GA	GD	Pts	Qualification or relegation
1	UANL	17	15	2	0	52	7	+45	47	Advance to Liguilla (Note: The first 8 places in the table qualify for the Liguilla.)
2	Monterrey (C)	17	14	2	1	45	10	+35	44	Advance to Liguilla
3	Atlas	17	11	3	3	30	16	+14	36	Advance to Liguilla
4	Guadalajara	17	10	3	4	35	17	+18	33	Advance to Liguilla
5	América	17	9	4	4	33	19	+14	31	Advance to Liguilla
6	Santos Laguna	17	9	3	5	37	26	+11	30	Advance to Liguilla
7	Tijuana	17	9	3	5	30	19	+11	30	Advance to Liguilla
8	Cruz Azul	17	7	3	7	15	28	−13	24	Advance to Liguilla
9	Pachuca	17	6	5	6	28	24	+4	23	
10	UNAM	17	5	6	6	19	16	+3	21	
11	Puebla	17	5	3	9	18	30	−12	18	
12	Toluca	17	5	3	9	13	27	−14	18	
13	Necaxa	17	5	3	9	16	34	−18	18	
14	Querétaro	17	4	4	9	19	23	−4	16	
15	León	17	3	5	9	18	30	−12	14	
16	Atlético San Luis	17	2	7	8	14	32	−18	13	
17	Mazatlán	17	1	3	13	6	40	−34	6	
18	Juárez	17	1	2	14	11	41	−30	5	

Updated to match(es) played on 21 November 2021. Source: Liga MX Femenil
Rules for classification: 1) Points; 2) Goal difference; 3) Number of goals scored; 4) Head-to-head results between tied teams; 5) Number of goals scored away; 6) Highest relegation coefficient; 7) Fair Play points
(C) Champions

==== Positions by Round ====
Qualification to quarter-finals
Last place in table

Team ╲ Round	1	2	3	4	5	6	7	8	9	10	11	12	13	14	15	16	17
UANL	3	2	1	1	1	1	1	1	1	1	1	1	1	1	1	1	1
Monterrey	7	5	5	3	3	3	3	3	2	2	2	2	2	2	2	2	2
Guadalajara	1	4	4	2	2	2	2	2	3	3	3	3	3	4	4	4	3
Atlas	4	3	3	5	5	6	7	7	8	6	6	6	6	6	5	3	4
América	5	1	2	4	4	4	4	4	5	5	5	5	5	5	6	6	5
Santos Laguna	14	9	9	7	8	5	5	5	4	4	4	4	4	3	3	5	7
Tijuana	10	6	8	8	6	7	6	6	6	7	7	7	7	7	7	7	7
Cruz Azul	6	8	6	6	9	9	10	8	7	8	9	9	8	8	8	8	8
Pachuca	11	7	10	11	11	12	8	9	11	13	12	12	11	10	9	9	9
UNAM	12	13	14	15	15	16	14	11	13	9	8	8	9	9	10	10	10
Puebla	2	10	7	10	7	8	9	10	12	12	13	15	13	13	11	11	11
Toluca	13	15	11	9	10	10	12	13	15	15	14	11	11	11	12	12	12
Necaxa	9	14	15	16	16	15	16	14	9	10	10	10	12	12	13	13	13
Querétaro	8	12	13	14	14	11	13	15	10	11	11	13	15	15	14	14	14
León	16	17	16	13	12	13	11	12	14	14	15	14	16	16	15	15	15
Atlético San Luis	18	11	12	12	13	14	15	17	17	16	16	16	14	14	16	16	16
Mazatlán	17	18	17	18	18	18	18	18	18	18	18	17	17	17	17	17	17
Juárez	15	16	18	17	17	17	17	16	16	17	17	18	18	18	18	18	18

Updated to match(es) played on 21 November 2021. Source: Liga MX Femenil

==== Results ====
Each team plays once all other teams in 17 rounds regardless of it being a home or away match.

Home \ Away	AME	ATL	ASL	CAZ	GUA	JUA	LEO	MAZ	MON	NEC	PAC	PUE	QUE	SAN	TIJ	TOL	UNL	UNM
América	—	—	4–0	2–1	—	—	4–1	—	—	—	—	3–0	—	2–1	2–0	1–3	1–1	2–2
Atlas	3–2	—	—	3–0	—	—	—	—	1–2	1–0	2–1	—	2–1	—	—	—	0–4	0–0
Atlético San Luis	—	0–0	—	—	—	4–0	—	1–1	0–3	1–1	1–1	—	—	—	1–3	—	—	2–1
Cruz Azul	—	—	2–0	—	1–1	—	0–0	2–0	—	1–0	—	—	—	—	—	2–1	0–3	1–1
Guadalajara	2–1	1–0	5–0	—	—	—	2–1	2–0	—	6–0	2–1	—	0–2	—	—	—	1–1	—
Juárez	1–1	0–3	—	0–1	1–2	—	0–2	—	—	—	1–3	1–2	—	1–2	2–4	—	—	—
León	—	0–1	0–0	—	—	—	—	5–0	—	1–1	1–3	—	—	1–6	—	—	0–2	0–0
Mazatlán	0–0	0–3	—	—	—	1–2	—	—	0–3	—	3–3	—	1–0	0–2	—	0–1	—	—
Monterrey	3–1	—	—	5–0	2–1	2–0	3–1	—	—	—	—	2–0	—	—	4–0	2–0	—	—
Necaxa	0–2	—	—	—	—	3–1	—	3–0	1–6	—	1–2	1–0	2–0	0–3	1–2	—	—	—
Pachuca	0–2	—	—	0–1	—	—	—	—	0–1	—	—	6–2	2–0	4–0	0–0	1–1	—	1–1
Puebla	—	0–4	1–1	3–0	1–1	—	3–1	2–0	—	—	—	—	0–1	2–3	—	—	0–3	—
Querétaro	1–3	—	1–1	1–2	—	4–0	1–1	—	1–1	—	—	—	—	4–2	—	0–1	1–2	—
Santos Laguna	—	2–2	3–1	4–0	5–4	—	—	—	2–2	—	—	—	—	—	0–0	—	0–2	2–0
Tijuana	—	1–2	—	4–1	0–1	—	4–0	5–0	—	—	—	2–0	1–1	—	—	2–0	—	—
Toluca	—	2–3	1–0	—	0–4	1–1	0–3	—	—	0–1	—	1–1	—	1–0	—	—	—	—
UANL	—	—	5–1	—	—	3–0	—	2–0	2–1	8–1	5–0	—	—	—	3–0	4–0	—	2–1
UNAM	—	—	—	—	1–0	3–0	—	4–0	0–3	0–0	—	0–1	2–0	—	1–2	2–0	—	—

Updated to match(es) played on 21 November 2021. Source: Liga MX Femenil
Legend: Blue = home team win; Yellow = draw; Red = away team win.

=== Regular season statistics ===
==== Top goalscorers ====
Players sorted first by goals scored, then by last name.

Rank	Player	Club	Goals
1	(Mexico) Alicia Cervantes	Guadalajara	17
2	(Mexico) Renae Cuéllar	Tijuana	15
3	(Mexico) Desirée Monsiváis	Monterrey	14
4	(Mexico) Alison González	Atlas	13
4	(Mexico) Stephany Mayor	UANL	13
6	(Mexico) Katty Martínez	UANL	12
7	(Mexico) Daniela Espinosa	América	11
7	(Mexico) Alexia Villanueva	Santos Laguna	11
9	(Mexico) Diana Evangelista	Monterrey	9
9	(Mexico) Viridiana Salazar	Pachuca	9

Source:Liga MX Femenil

==== Hat-tricks ====
Player	For	Against	Result	Date	Round	Reference
(Mexico) Alison González	Atlas	Toluca	2 – 3 (A)	19 July 2021	1	
(Mexico) Katty Martínez	UANL	Necaxa	8 – 1 (H)	2 August 2021	3	
(Mexico) Stephany Mayor	UANL	Atlas	0 – 4 (A)	7 August 2021	4	
(Mexico) Katty Martínez	UANL	Atlético San Luis	5 – 1 (H)	16 August 2021	5	
(Mexico) Renae Cuéllar	Tijuana	León	4 – 0 (H)	6 September 2021	8	
(Mexico) Desirée Monsiváis	Monterrey	Necaxa	1 – 6 (A)	16 October 2021	13	
(Mexico) Renae Cuéllar	Tijuana	Mazatlán	5 – 0 (H)	8 November 2021	15	
(Mexico) Daniela Espinosa	América	León	4 – 1 (H)	20 November 2021	17	

(H) – Home; (A) – Away

=== Attendance ===
==== Per team ====
	Home match played behind closed doors
	Away match
	Highest attended match
	Lowest attended match
PPD	Match postponed

Team	Week																	Total Att	Avg.	Total Pld
Team	1	2	3	4	5	6	7	8	9	10	11	12	13	14	15	16	17	Total Att	Avg.	Total Pld
América	3,164	3,510		2,410		2,322		3,191			3,442		612			7,624	520	26,795	2,977	9
Atlas		0		0		0	0			0		0			0	10		10	10	1
Atlético San Luis		1,352		1,043			234		733		554	583			1080		465	6,044	756	8
Cruz Azul		0		0		0		0	0			0	97		87			184	92	2
Guadalajara	781		890		44		78	2,776		1,007		3,998	2,922		108			12,604	1,400	9
Juárez	0		0	0			0		0		0		80		0		75	155	78	2
León		400		201		481			379	170			533	395		163		2,722	340	8
Mazatlán		561			427	318		0		1,192		823		1,117		624		5,062	723	7
Monterrey		128		1,020		1,321			160		1,524			2,454		5,149	2,662	14,418	1,802	8
Necaxa		478		281		192	633		193		185		636	394		295		3,287	295	9
Pachuca	0		0		0		0	0			2,048	3,823			3,014		1,613	10,498	2,625	4
Puebla	482		470		510			471	324		1,387		296	1,463			846	6,249	694	9
Querétaro	0		0		0	0		0		0			0	0		0		0	0	0
Santos Laguna			617		497		601		907	831			0	957			1,792	6,202	886	7
Tijuana		0		0		0		0			0	0			0	0		0	0	0
Toluca	624		1,947		1,547			859		2,947		1,061			711		2,416	12,112	1,514	8
UANL	5,530		4,105		3,705		4,013		6,725	4,290		25,406		5,840	5,504			65,118	7,235	9
UNAM	2,653		0		0		0			1,256	2,974			1,125		826	713	9,547	1,591	6
Total	13,234	6,429	8,029	4,955	6,730	4,634	5,559	7,297	9,421	11,693	12,114	35,694	5,176	13,745	10,504	14,691	11,102	181,007	1,708	106

Source: Liga MX Femenil

==== Highest and lowest ====
Highest attended					Lowest attended			
Week	Home	Score	Away	Attendance	Home	Score	Away	Attendance
1	UANL	2–0	Mazatlán	5,530	Puebla	3–1	León	482
2	América	3–0	Puebla	3,510	Monterrey	2–0	Juárez	128
3	UANL	8–1	Necaxa	4,105	Puebla	2–0	Mazatlán	470
4	América	1–3	Toluca	2,410	León	5–0	Mazatlán	201
5	UANL	5–1	Atlético San Luis	3,705	Guadalajara	6–0	Necaxa	44
6	América	4–0	Atlético San Luis	2,322	Necaxa	1–0	Puebla	192
7	UANL	4–0	Toluca	4,013	Guadalajara	2–0	Mazatlán	78
8	América	2–2	UNAM	3,191	Puebla	2–3	Santos Laguna	471
9	UANL	5–0	Pachuca	6,725	Monterrey	4–0	Tijuana	160
10	UANL	3–0	Tijuana	4,290	León	1–1	Necaxa	170
11	América	2–1	Cruz Azul	3,442	Necaxa	2–0	Querétaro	185
12	UANL	2–1	Monterrey	25,406	Atlético San Luis	4–0	Juárez	583
13	Guadalajara	1–1	UANL	2,922	Juárez	1–3	Pachuca	80
14	UANL	3–0	Juárez	5,840	Necaxa	1–2	Tijuana	394
15	UANL	2–1	UNAM	5,504	Cruz Azul	1–0	Necaxa	87
16	América	1–1	UANL	7,624	Atlas	2–1	Pachuca	10
17	Monterrey	5–0	Cruz Azul	2,662	Juárez	2–4	Tijuana	75

Source: Liga MX

1. Does not include matches played behind closed doors.

=== Liguilla ===
The eight best teams play two games against each other on a home-and-away basis. The higher seeded teams play on their home field during the second leg. The winner of each match up is determined by aggregate score. In the quarterfinals and semifinals, if the two teams are tied on aggregate, the higher seeded team advances. In the final, if the two teams are tied after both legs, the match goes to a penalty shoot-out.

Quarter-finals
1	UANL	4	4	8
8	Cruz Azul	0	0	0
4	Guadalajara	1	0	1
5	América	2	0	2
2	Monterrey (s)	1	1	2
7	Tijuana	1	1	2
3	Atlas	2	2	4
6	Santos Laguna	2	1	3

Semi-finals
1	UANL	1	4	5
5	América	2	0	2
2	Monterrey (s)	0	2	2
3	Atlas	1	1	2

Final
1	UANL	2	0	2 (1)
2	Monterrey (p.)	2	0	2 (3)

==== Quarter-finals ====
The first legs were played on 3 December, and the second legs were played on 6 December 2021.

Team 1	Agg.	Team 2	1st leg	2nd leg
UANL	8–0	Cruz Azul	4–0	4–0
Monterrey	(s) 2–2	Tijuana	1–1	1–1
Atlas	4–3	Santos Laguna	2–2	2–1
Guadalajara	1–2	América	1–2	0–0

===== First leg =====
3 December 2021	Cruz Azul	0–4	UANL	Xochimilco, Mexico City
12:45 CST (UTC−6)		Report	Mayor 4'; Sánchez 34'; Ovalle 38'; Solís 89'	Stadium: Instalaciones de La Noria; Attendance: 530; Referee: Ana Cristina Guarneros Lezama

3 December 2021	Santos Laguna	2–2	Atlas	Torreón, Coahuila
18:00 CST (UTC−6)	Jiménez 56'; Gómez 59'	Report	Ibarra 52'; Arce 80'	Stadium: Estadio Corona; Attendance: 1,129; Referee: Priscila Eritzel Pérez Borja

3 December 2021	América	2–1	Guadalajara	Coyoacán, Mexico City
20:00 CST (UTC−6)	Luebbert 9'; Castillo 38' (own)	Report	Cervantes 48'	Stadium: Estadio Azteca; Attendance: 8,878; Referee: Lizzet Amairany García Olvera

3 December 2021	Tijuana	1–1	Monterrey	Tijuana, Baja California
19:30 PST (UTC−8)	Muñoz 6'	Report	Monsiváis 85'	Stadium: Estadio Caliente; Attendance: 1,333; Referee: Karen Hernández Andrade

===== Second leg =====
6 December 2021	Atlas	2–1 (4–3 agg.)	Santos Laguna	Guadalajara, Jalisco
12:00 CST (UTC−6)	González 29'; Ibarra 62'	Report	Peraza 31'	Stadium: Estadio Jalisco; Attendance: 260; Referee: Diana Stephanía Pérez Borja

6 December 2021	Guadalajara	0–0 (1–2 agg.)	América	Zapopan, Jalisco
19:00 CST (UTC−6)		Report		Stadium: Estadio Akron; Attendance: 7,283; Referee: Francia María González Martínez

6 December 2021	UANL	4–0 (8–0 agg.)	Cruz Azul	San Nicolás de los Garza, Nuevo León
19:00 CST (UTC−6)	Antonio 4'; Ferrer 80'; Sánchez 83', 90'	Report		Stadium: Estadio Universitario; Attendance: 9,401; Referee: Itzel Hernández Fuentes

6 December 2021	Monterrey	1–1 (2–2 agg.)	Tijuana	Guadalupe, Nuevo León
21:00 CST (UTC−6)	Monsiváis 42'	Report	Hix 32'	Stadium: Estadio BBVA; Attendance: 5,822; Referee: Katia Itzel García Mendoza

==== Semi-finals ====
The first legs were played on 10 December, and the second legs were played on 13 December 2021.

Team 1	Agg.	Team 2	1st leg	2nd leg
UANL	5–2	América	1–2	4–0
Monterrey	(s) 2–2	Atlas	0–1	2–1

===== First leg =====
10 December 2021	Atlas	1–0	Monterrey	Guadalajara, Jalisco
11:00 CST (UTC−6)	González 68'	Report		Stadium: Estadio Jalisco; Attendance: 272; Referee: Francia María González Martínez

10 December 2021	América	2–1	UANL	Coyoacán, Mexico City
20:00 CST (UTC−6)	Espinosa 54'; Luebbert 78'	Report	Mayor 81'	Stadium: Estadio Azteca; Attendance: 8,884; Referee: Priscila Eritzel Pérez Borja

===== Second leg =====
13 December 2021	UANL	4–0 (5–2 agg.)	América	San Nicolás de los Garza, Nuevo León
19:00 CST (UTC−6)	Mercado 57'; Mayor 63'; Sánchez 69', 85'	Report		Stadium: Estadio Universitario; Attendance: 25,631; Referee: Karen Hernández Andrade

13 December 2021	Monterrey	2–1 (2–2 agg.)	Atlas	Guadalupe, Nuevo León
21:00 CST (UTC−6)	Burkenroad 55'; Evangelista 62'	Report	González 41'	Stadium: Estadio BBVA; Attendance: 8,594; Referee: Diana Stephanía Pérez Borja

==== Final ====
The first leg was played on 17 December, and the second leg was played on 20 December 2021.

Team 1	Agg.	Team 2	1st leg	2nd leg
UANL	2–2 (1–3)	(p.) Monterrey	2–2	0–0

===== First leg =====
17 December 2021	Monterrey	2–2	UANL	Guadalupe, Nuevo León
21:00 CST (UTC−6)	Ferral 11' (own); Rodríguez 40'	Report	Espinoza 19'; Mayor 70'	Stadium: Estadio BBVA; Attendance: 34,191; Referee: Aldo Ballesteros Barba

===== Second leg =====
20 December 2021	UANL	0–0 (2–2 agg.) (1–3 p)	Monterrey	San Nicolás de los Garza, Nuevo León
20:00 CST (UTC−6)		Report		Stadium: Estadio Universitario; Attendance: 36,843; Referee: Francia Maria Gonzalez Martinez
	Penalties
	Mercado (penalty scored); Antonio (penalty missed); Ovalle (penalty missed); Rangel (penalty missed)		Monsiváis (penalty scored); Cadena (penalty scored); Bernal (penalty scored)

Apertura 2021 winners

2nd title

== Torneo Clausura ==
The Torneo Clausura 2022, officially named Torneo Grita México Clausura 2022, is the second tournament of the season. The tournament began on 7 January 2022.

=== Regular season ===
==== Standings ====
Pos	Team	Pld	W	D	L	GF	GA	GD	Pts	Qualification or relegation
1	Monterrey	17	14	1	2	51	13	+38	43	Advance to Liguilla (Note: The first 8 places in the table qualify for the Liguilla.)
2	Guadalajara (C)	17	13	4	0	27	6	+21	43	Advance to Liguilla
3	UANL	17	11	6	0	43	11	+32	39	Advance to Liguilla
4	América	17	11	4	2	41	14	+27	37	Advance to Liguilla
5	Pachuca	17	9	3	5	28	22	+6	30	Advance to Liguilla
6	Atlas	17	7	6	4	27	25	+2	27	Advance to Liguilla
7	UNAM	17	6	4	7	18	17	+1	22	Advance to Liguilla
8	Tijuana	17	4	9	4	24	29	−5	21	Advance to Liguilla
9	Cruz Azul	17	6	3	8	22	30	−8	21	
10	Toluca	17	5	5	7	29	32	−3	20	
11	Atlético San Luis	17	5	5	7	23	29	−6	20	
12	Querétaro	17	5	3	9	16	29	−13	18	
13	Santos Laguna	17	5	2	10	17	29	−12	17	
14	Necaxa	17	3	6	8	17	31	−14	15	
15	Mazatlán	17	3	4	10	11	30	−19	13	
16	León	17	3	4	10	18	40	−22	13	
17	Puebla	17	3	3	11	11	25	−14	12	
18	Juárez	17	3	2	12	18	29	−11	11	

Updated to match(es) played on 2 May 2022. Source: Liga MX Femenil
Rules for classification: 1) Points; 2) Goal difference; 3) Number of goals scored; 4) Head-to-head results between tied teams; 5) Number of goals scored away; 6) Highest relegation coefficient; 7) Fair Play points
(C) Champions

==== Positions by Round ====
Qualification to quarter-finals
Last place in table

Team ╲ Round	1	2	3	4	5	6	7	8	9	10	11	12	13	14	15	16	17
Monterrey	10	8	2	2	2	1	1	1	1	1	1	1	1	1	1	1	1
Guadalajara	1	1	1	1	1	3	2	4	4	3	3	3	3	3	3	2	2
UANL	2	3	7	4	5	5	5	2	2	2	2	2	2	2	2	3	3
América	9	6	11	5	4	4	3	3	3	4	4	4	5	4	4	4	4
Pachuca	18	12	3	3	3	2	4	5	5	5	5	5	4	5	5	5	5
Atlas	8	13	6	9	6	6	6	7	6	6	6	6	6	6	6	6	6
UNAM	7	10	14	13	7	7	7	11	8	7	7	7	7	8	10	8	7
Tijuana	5	4	4	7	8	8	8	8	10	10	12	9	8	7	8	9	8
Cruz Azul	4	5	9	6	9	10	10	9	9	11	15	16	11	9	11	10	9
Toluca	3	2	8	10	12	12	14	13	13	12	10	12	10	11	7	7	10
Atlético San Luis	6	7	5	8	10	11	12	12	12	16	16	17	17	15	9	12	11
Querétaro	11	16	13	12	13	13	9	6	7	8	9	8	9	10	12	11	12
Santos Laguna	12	15	16	11	15	17	17	17	17	17	17	11	15	14	17	13	13
Necaxa	16	11	10	14	16	15	11	10	11	15	14	15	14	16	13	14	14
Mazatlán	13	14	15	16	11	14	15	16	15	14	13	14	16	17	18	15	15
León	14	17	18	18	14	9	13	14	14	13	8	10	12	13	15	16	16
Puebla	17	18	17	17	18	16	16	15	16	9	11	13	13	12	14	17	17
Juárez	15	9	12	15	17	18	18	18	18	18	18	18	18	18	16	18	18

Updated to match(es) played on 2 May 2022. Source: Liga MX Femenil

==== Results ====
Each team plays once all other teams in 17 rounds regardless of it being a home or away match.

Home \ Away	AME	ATL	ASL	CAZ	GUA	JUA	LEO	MAZ	MON	NEC	PAC	PUE	QUE	SAN	TIJ	TOL	UNL	UNM
América	—	1–1	—	—	1–2	2–1	—	3–0	0–2	3–0	4–0	—	4–1	—	—	—	—	—
Atlas	—	—	1–1	—	0–1	2–1	2–1	1–1	—	—	—	1–0	—	1–0	6–1	3–2	—	—
Atlético San Luis	1–4	—	—	1–1	0–0	—	4–0	—	—	—	—	3–1	3–1	2–4	—	2–2	0–6	—
Cruz Azul	1–3	2–1	—	—	—	1–0	—	—	1–3	—	0–2	3–1	0–1	2–3	2–2	—	—	—
Guadalajara	—	—	—	1–0	—	0–0	—	—	1–0	—	—	1–0	—	1–0	3–0	2–0	—	2–1
Juárez	—	—	0–1	—	—	—	—	1–1	1–3	2–3	—	—	2–1	—	—	0–1	1–2	1–0
León	1–4	—	—	2–3	0–2	1–3	—	—	1–6	—	—	2–0	4–2	—	1–1	2–2	—	—
Mazatlán	—	—	1–0	1–2	0–1	—	0–0	—	—	2–1	—	0–0	—	—	2–1	—	2–4	0–2
Monterrey	—	5–1	1–0	—	—	—	—	4–0	—	5–2	5–0	—	3–0	3–1	—	—	0–0	5–2
Necaxa	—	1–1	1–2	1–2	0–3	—	0–0	—	—	—	—	—	—	—	—	2–2	1–3	1–0
Pachuca	—	2–2	2–0	—	1–4	3–1	3–0	5–0	—	1–1	—	—	—	—	—	—	0–1	—
Puebla	1–1	—	—	—	—	2–1	—	—	0–3	0–1	1–2	—	—	—	2–0	1–3	—	2–1
Querétaro	—	1–3	—	—	2–2	—	—	2–1	—	3–0	0–2	1–0	—	—	0–2	—	—	0–0
Santos Laguna	0–3	—	—	—	—	3–1	1–3	1–0	—	1–1	0–1	0–0	0–1	—	—	1–0	—	—
Tijuana	2–2	—	2–2	—	—	3–2	—	—	2–0	1–1	1–1	—	—	2–1	—	—	1–1	0–0
Toluca	0–4	—	—	3–1	—	—	—	2–0	1–3	—	1–3	—	3–0	—	3–3	—	2–2	2–3
UANL	1–1	5–1	—	4–0	1–1	—	6–0	—	—	—	—	2–0	0–0	4–1	—	—	—	—
UNAM	0–1	0–0	2–1	1–1	—	—	1–0	—	—	—	1–0	—	—	4–0	—	—	0–1	—

Updated to match(es) played on 2 May 2022. Source: Liga MX Femenil
Legend: Blue = home team win; Yellow = draw; Red = away team win.

=== Regular season statistics ===
==== Top goalscorers ====
Players sorted first by goals scored, then by last name.

Rank	Player	Club	Goals
1	(Mexico) Alicia Cervantes	Guadalajara	14
2	(Mexico) Charlyn Corral	Pachuca	13
3	(United States) Scarlett Camberos	América	11
3	(Mexico) Stephany Mayor	UANL	11
5	(Nigeria) Uchenna Kanu	UANL	10
6	(Mexico) Daniela Calderón	León	9
6	(United States) Destinney Duron	Toluca	9
6	(Mexico) Adriana Iturbide	Atlas	9
6	(Mexico) Katty Martínez	América	9
6	(Mexico) Desirée Monsiváis	Monterrey	9

Source:Liga MX Femenil

==== Hat-tricks ====
Player	For	Against	Result	Date	Round	Reference
(Mexico) Alicia Cervantes	Guadalajara	Necaxa	0 – 3 (A)	28 January 2022	4	
(Nigeria) Uchenna Kanu	UANL	Atlas	5 – 1 (H)	28 January 2022	4	
(Mexico) Daniela Calderón	León	Querétaro	4 – 2 (H)	31 January 2022	5	
(United States) Scarlett Camberos	América	León	1 – 4 (A)	10 February 2022	7	
(Mexico) Desirée Monsiváis	Monterrey	Atlas	5 – 1 (H)	28 February 2022	8	
(Mexico) Stephany Mayor	UANL	León	6 – 0 (H)	21 March 2022	12	
(Nigeria) Uchenna Kanu	UANL	Santos Laguna	4 – 1 (H)	18 April 2022	15	

(H) – Home; (A) – Away

=== Attendance ===
==== Per team ====
Pos	Team	Total	High	Low	Average	Change
1	Monterrey	58,523	31,098	374	6,503	+260.9%
2	UANL	44,971	13,151	1,978	5,621	−22.3%
3	América	20,711	9,805	500	2,589	−13.0%
4	Pachuca	13,707	4,853	322	1,958	−25.4%
5	Toluca	14,158	5,166	618	1,589	+5.0%
6	UNAM	12,218	2,610	616	1,573	−1.1%
7	Tijuana	11,297	4,633	333	1,255	n/a
8	Querétaro	4,791	1,732	550	1,198	n/a^{4}
9	Atlético San Luis	7,272	2,307	448	1,039	+37.4%^{2}
10	Puebla	7,114	3,053	440	889	+28.1%
11	León	7,052	2,789	125	882	+159.4%^{1}
12	Juárez	6,061	1,675	50	866	+1,010.3%
13	Mazatlán	7,295	1,555	595	811	+12.2%
14	Necaxa	4,022	1,436	358	670	+127.1%
15	Santos Laguna	4,582	1,370	147	509	−42.6%
16	Guadalajara	3,361	1,274	68	420	−73.4%
17	Atlas	3,190	1,476	72	354	+3,440.0%
18	Cruz Azul	725	133	45	121	+31.5%^{3}
	League total	231,060	31,098	45	1,639	−6.0%

Source: Liga MX
Notes:
The number listed represents the number of home matches the club played behind closed doors.

==== Highest and lowest ====
Highest attended					Lowest attended			
Week	Home	Score	Away	Attendance	Home	Score	Away	Attendance
1	Monterrey	3–0	Querétaro	3,577	Puebla	1–3	Toluca	506
2	UANL	1–1	Guadalajara	4,685	Atlas	1–1	Mazatlán	117
3	América	0–2	Monterrey	3,180	Atlas	1–0	Santos Laguna	216
4	UANL	5–1	Atlas	1,978	León	1–1	Tijuana	222
5	Tijuana	1–1	UANL	1,733	León	4–2	Querétaro	125
6	Monterrey	5–2	UNAM	3,058	Santos Laguna	1–3	León	319
7	UANL	2–0	Puebla	3,661	Guadalajara	1–0	Santos Laguna	68
8	Pachuca	0–1	UANL	4,853	Cruz Azul	2–2	Tijuana	45
9	UANL	0–0	Querétaro	6,796	Atlas	6–1	Tijuana	338
10	América	1–2	Guadalajara	9,805	Cruz Azul	2–3	Santos Laguna	123
11	Monterrey	1–0	Atlético San Luis	5,013	Guadalajara	3–0	Tijuana	80
12	UANL	6–0	León	6,522	Cruz Azul	0–2	Pachuca	133
13	Puebla	1–1	América	3,053	Cruz Azul	2–1	Atlas	116
14	Monterrey	5–0	Pachuca	6,142	Santos Laguna	0–0	Puebla	147
15	Tijuana	2–2	América	4,633	Cruz Azul	1–3	Monterrey	183
16	Monterrey	0–0	UANL	31,098	León	2–2	Toluca	383
17	UANL	1–1	América	13,151	Atlas	2–1	León	72

Source: Liga MX

1. Does not include matches played behind closed doors.

=== Liguilla ===
The eight best teams play two games against each other on a home-and-away basis. The higher seeded teams play on their home field during the second leg. The winner of each match up is determined by aggregate score. In the quarterfinals and semifinals, if the two teams are tied on aggregate, the higher seeded team advances. In the final, if the two teams are tied after both legs, the match goes to a penalty shoot-out.

Quarter-finals
2	Guadalajara	2	3	5
7	UNAM	2	2	4
3	UANL	7	2	9
6	Atlas	0	1	1
1	Monterrey	1	2	3
8	Tijuana	0	1	1
4	América	1	1	2
5	Pachuca	2	2	4

Semi-finals
2	Guadalajara (s)	0	2	2
3	UANL	2	0	2
1	Monterrey	0	2	2
5	Pachuca	2	1	3

Final
2	Guadalajara	4	0	4
5	Pachuca	2	1	3

==== Quarter-finals ====
The first legs were played on 5 and 6 May, and the second legs were played on 8 and 9 May 2022.

Team 1	Agg.	Team 2	1st leg	2nd leg
Monterrey	3–1	Tijuana	1–0	2–1
Guadalajara	5–4	UNAM	2–2	3–2
UANL	9–1	Atlas	7–0	2–1
América	2–4	Pachuca	1–2	1–2

===== First leg =====
5 May 2022	Atlas	0–7	UANL	Guadalajara, Jalisco
17:00 CDT (UTC−5)		Report	Kanu 6'; Rangel 15'; Mayor 38', 90+2'; Ovalle 45', 52'; Fishel 60'	Stadium: Estadio Jalisco; Attendance: 908; Referee: Julio César Gil Jiménez

5 May 2022	Pachuca	2–1	América	Pachuca, Hidalgo
19:00 CDT (UTC−5)	Corral 15'; Ángeles 55'	Report	Martínez 21'	Stadium: Estadio Hidalgo; Attendance: 6,239; Referee: Ricardo Emmanuel Chávez Sánchez

6 May 2022	UNAM	2–2	Guadalajara	Mexico City
18:00 CDT (UTC−5)	Chavarin 50', 72'	Report	Cervantes 37'; Bejarano 66'	Stadium: Estadio Olímpico Universitario; Attendance: 6,303; Referee: Ignacio Góngora García

6 May 2022	Tijuana	0–1	Monterrey	Tijuana, Baja California
19:00 PDT (UTC−7)		Report	Aviléz 81'	Stadium: Estadio Caliente; Attendance: 3,933; Referee: Ana Cristina Guarneros Lezama

===== Second leg =====
8 May 2022	América	1–2 (2–4 agg.)	Pachuca	Mexico City
12:00 CDT (UTC−5)	Espinosa 70'	Report	Farías 6' (own); Corral 67'	Stadium: Estadio Azteca; Attendance: 15,472; Referee: Francia María González Martínez

8 May 2022	UANL	2–1 (9–1 agg.)	Atlas	San Nicolás de los Garza, Nuevo León
21:06 CDT (UTC−5)	Fishel 19', 41'	Report	Ibarra 4'	Stadium: Estadio Universitario; Attendance: 5,314; Referee: Katia Itzel García Mendoza

9 May 2022	Guadalajara	3–2 (5–4 agg.)	UNAM	Zapopan, Jalisco
19:00 CDT (UTC−5)	González 40'; Jaramillo 54'; Cervantes 86' (pen.)	Report	Rodríguez 5'; Chavarin 33'	Stadium: Estadio Akron; Attendance: 3,978; Referee: Priscila Eritzel Pérez Borja

9 May 2022	Monterrey	2–1 (3–1 agg.)	Tijuana	Guadalupe, Nuevo León
21:00 CDT (UTC−5)	Burkenroad 24'; Bernal 42'	Report	del Campo 59' (own)	Stadium: Estadio BBVA; Attendance: 4,668; Referee: Diana Stephanía Pérez Borja

==== Semi-finals ====
The first legs will be played on 13 May, and the second legs will be played on 16 May 2022.

Team 1	Agg.	Team 2	1st leg	2nd leg
Monterrey	2–3	Pachuca	0–2	2–1
Guadalajara	(s) 2–2	UANL	0–2	2–0

===== First leg =====
13 May 2022	Pachuca	2–0	Monterrey	Pachuca, Hidalgo
18:05 CDT (UTC−5)	Corral 20', 42'	Report		Stadium: Estadio Hidalgo; Attendance: 4,711; Referee: Lizzet Amairany García Olvera

13 May 2022	UANL	2–0	Guadalajara	San Nicolás de los Garza, Nuevo León
20:05 CDT (UTC−5)	Fishel 62'; Kanu 77'	Report		Stadium: Estadio Universitario; Attendance: 11,106; Referee: Karen Hernández Andrade

===== Second leg =====
16 May 2022	Guadalajara	2–0 (2–2 agg.)	UANL	Zapopan, Jalisco
19:00 CDT (UTC−5)	Bernal 44'; Guzmán 86'	Report		Stadium: Estadio Akron; Attendance: 8,338; Referee: Katia Itzel García Mendoza

16 May 2022	Monterrey	2–1 (2–3 agg.)	Pachuca	Guadalupe, Nuevo León
21:05 CDT (UTC−5)	Franco 48'; Bernal 57' (pen.)	Report	Salazar 59'	Stadium: Estadio BBVA; Attendance: 10,140; Referee: Julio César Gil Jiménez

==== Final ====
The first leg were played on 20 May, and the second leg were played on 23 May 2022.

Team 1	Agg.	Team 2	1st leg	2nd leg
Guadalajara	4–3	Pachuca	4–2	0–1

===== First leg =====
20 May 2022	Pachuca	2–4	Guadalajara	Pachuca, Hidalgo
21:00 CDT (UTC−5)	Salazar 27'; Ocampo 53'	Report	Valenzuela 50'; Ocampo 71' (own); Cervantes 80', 90+5'	Stadium: Estadio Hidalgo; Attendance: 19,348; Referee: Priscila Eritzel Pérez Borja

===== Second leg =====
23 May 2022	Guadalajara	0–1 (4–3 agg.)	Pachuca	Zapopan, Jalisco
20:00 CDT (UTC−5)		Report	Ángeles 60'	Stadium: Estadio Akron; Attendance: 40,462; Referee: Francia Maria Gonzalez Martinez

Clausura 2022 winners

2nd title

== Aggregate table ==
The aggregate table (the sum of points of both the Apertura 2021 and Clausura 2022 tournaments) was being used to determine seeds in the Campeón de Campeones.

Pos	Team	Pld	W	D	L	GF	GA	GD	Pts	Qualification or relegation
1	Monterrey (A)	34	28	3	3	96	23	+73	87	Campeón de Campeones
2	UANL	34	26	8	0	95	18	+77	86	
3	Guadalajara (C, X)	34	23	7	4	62	23	+39	76	Campeón de Campeones
4	América	34	20	8	6	74	33	+41	68	
5	Atlas	34	18	9	7	57	41	+16	63	
6	Pachuca	34	15	8	11	56	46	+10	53	
7	Tijuana	34	13	12	9	54	48	+6	51	
8	Santos Laguna	34	14	5	15	54	55	−1	47	
9	Cruz Azul	34	13	6	15	37	58	−21	45	
10	UNAM	34	11	10	13	37	33	+4	43	
11	Toluca	34	10	8	16	42	59	−17	38	
12	Querétaro	34	9	7	18	35	52	−17	34	
13	Atlético San Luis	34	7	12	15	37	61	−24	33	
14	Necaxa	34	8	9	17	33	65	−32	33	
15	Puebla	34	8	6	20	29	55	−26	30	
16	León	34	6	9	19	36	70	−34	27	
17	Mazatlán	34	4	7	23	17	70	−53	19	
18	Juárez	34	4	4	26	29	70	−41	16	

Updated to match(es) played on 2 May 2022. Source: Liga MX Femenil
Rules for classification: 1) Points; 2) Goal difference; 3) Number of goals scored; 4) Head-to-head results between tied teams; 5) Number of goals scored away; 6) Highest relegation coefficient; 7) Fair Play points
(A) Apertura champion; (C) Champions; (X) Clausura champion

== Campeón de Campeonas ==
On May 24, 2021, the Liga MX Owners Assembly made official the creation of the Campeón de Campeonas ("Champion of Women's Champions"), a tournament between the two winning teams of the season's tournaments made with the goal of premiering the best team in all the annual cycle of Mexican women's football.

Monterrey qualified for this tournament after winning the Apertura Tournament and played against Guadalajara, the Clausura Tournament winner.

The first leg will be played on 27 May, and the second leg will be played on 30 May 2022.

Team 1	Agg.	Team 2	1st leg	2nd leg
Monterrey	1–1 (0–3)	(p.) Guadalajara	1–1	0–0

=== First leg ===
27 May 2022	Guadalajara	1–1	Monterrey	Zapopan, Jalisco
21:06 CDT (UTC−5)	Jaramillo 30'	Report	Burkenroad 56'	Stadium: Estadio Akron; Attendance: 14,642; Referee: Katia Itzel García Mendoza

=== Second leg ===
30 May 2022	Monterrey	0–0 (1–1 agg.) (0–3 p)	Guadalajara	Guadalupe, Nuevo León
20:06 CDT (UTC−5)		Report		Stadium: Estadio BBVA; Attendance: 15,575; Referee: Karen Hernández Andrade
	Penalties
	Monsiváis (penalty missed); Cadena (penalty missed); Bernal (penalty missed)		Cervantes (penalty scored); Montero (penalty scored); Montoya (penalty scored)

2021–22 winners

1st title
