= 2025–26 Liga MX Femenil season =

Mexican women's football league season

Liga MX Femenil
- Season: 2025–26
- Champions: Apertura: UANL (7th title); Clausura: América (3rd title)
- Matches: 306
- Goals: 1,038 (3.39 per match)
- Top goalscorer: Apertura: Charlyn Corral (22 goals); Clausura: Eugénie Le Sommer; Diana Ordóñez (18 goals)
- Biggest home win: Apertura: América 11–0 Querétaro (3 August 2025); Clausura: Pachuca 7–0 América (20 January 2026)
- Biggest away win: Apertura: Mazatlán 0–9 Pachuca (28 July 2025); Clausura: Necaxa 0–6 Pachuca (26 January 2026)
- Highest scoring: Apertura: América 11–0 Querétaro (3 August 2025); Clausura: Atlas 4–6 Cruz Azul (20 February 2026)
- Longest winning run: Apertura: 8 matches América; Clausura: 5 matches Guadalajara
- Longest unbeaten run: Apertura: 8 matches América; Clausura: 16 matches Monterrey
- Longest winless run: Apertura: 17 matches Mazatlán; Clausura: 13 matches Querétaro
- Longest losing run: Apertura: 8 matches Necaxa; Clausura: 9 matches Necaxa
- Highest attendance: Apertura: 16,884; UANL vs. Monterrey (7 September 2025); Clausura: 27,408; Monterrey vs. UANL (24 April 2026)
- Lowest attendance: Apertura: 24; Toluca vs. Mazatlán (4 October 2025); Clausura: 48; Puebla vs. Necaxa (25 April 2026)
- Total attendance: Apertura: 269,183; Clausura: 346,691
- Average attendance: Apertura: 1,807; Clausura: 2,281
- Stats are from the regular phase only. Source: Liga MX Femenil

The 2025–26 Liga MX Femenil season is the ninth season of the premier women's football league in Mexico. The season began on 11 July 2025 and will finish in May 2026.

== Stadiums and locations ==
América	Atlas	Atlético San Luis	Cruz Azul	Guadalajara
Estadio Ciudad de los Deportes	Estadio Jalisco	Estadio Libertad Financiera	Estadio Centenario	Estadio Akron
Capacity: 33,000	Capacity: 55,110	Capacity: 25,111	Capacity: 9,670	Capacity: 46,232
Juárez	León	Mazatlán	Monterrey	Necaxa
Estadio Olímpico Benito Juárez	Estadio León	Estadio El Encanto	Estadio BBVA	Estadio Victoria
Capacity: 19,703	Capacity: 31,297	Capacity: 25,000	Capacity: 51,348	Capacity: 23,851
Pachuca	Puebla	Querétaro	Santos Laguna	Tijuana
Estadio Hidalgo	Estadio Cuauhtémoc	Estadio Corregidora	Estadio Corona	Estadio Caliente
Capacity: 27,512	Capacity: 51,726	Capacity: 33,162	Capacity: 29,237	Capacity: 27,333
Toluca	UANL	UNAM		
Estadio Nemesio Díez	Estadio Universitario	Estadio Olímpico Universitario		
Capacity: 31,000	Capacity: 41,886	Capacity: 48,297		

== Alternate venues ==
- América – Cancha Centenario No. 5 (Capacity: 1,000)
- Atlas – CECAF (Capacity: 1,000)
- Cruz Azul – Instalaciones La Noria (Capacity: 2,000)
- Guadalajara – Verde Valle (Capacity: 800)
- Guadalajara – Estadio Jalisco (Capacity: 55,110)
- León – La Esmeralda Cancha Sintética (Capacity: 1,000)
- Mazatlán – Centro Deportivo Benito Juárez (Capacity: 1,000)
- Monterrey – El Barrial (Capacity: 570)
- Necaxa – Instalaciones Club Necaxa (Capacity: 1,000)
- Puebla - Club Alpha 3 (Capacity: 500)
- Querétaro - Estadio Olímpico Alameda (Capacity: 4,600)
- Toluca – Instalaciones Metepec (Capacity: 1,000)
- UANL – Instalaciones Zuazua (Capacity: 800)
- UNAM – La Cantera (Capacity: 2,000)
Location of the 2025–26 Liga MX Femenil teams
Location of the 2025–26 Liga MX Femenil teams in Greater Mexico City

== Personnel and kits ==
Team	Chairman	Head coach	Kit manufacturer	Shirt sponsor(s)
América	Santiago Baños	(Spain) Ángel Villacampa	Adidas	Caliente
Atlas	Aníbal Fájer	(Mexico) Juan Pablo Alfaro	Charly	Caliente
Atlético San Luis	Jacobo Payán Espinosa	(Mexico) Ignacio Quintana	Charly	Canel's
Cruz Azul	Víctor Velázquez	(Mexico) Israel del Real (Interim)	Pirma	Cemento Cruz Azul
Guadalajara	Amaury Vergara	(Spain) Antonio Contreras	Puma	Sello Rojo
Juárez	Andrés Fassi	(Spain) Óscar Fernández	Joma	
León	Jesús Martínez Murguia	(Mexico) Alejandro Corona	Charly	Cementos Fortaleza, Telcel
Mazatlán	Mauricio Lanz González	(Mexico) Nicolás Morales	Pirma	Banco Azteca
Monterrey	José Antonio Noriega	(France) Amandine Miquel	Puma	BBVA, Kotex, Tim Hortons
Necaxa	Ernesto Tinajero Flores	(Mexico) Christian Astorga	Pirma	Rolcar, Playdoit, JR Romo
Pachuca	Armando Martínez Patiño	(Mexico) Oscar Fernando Torres	Skechers	Cementos Fortaleza, Saba, JAC Motors, Telcel
Puebla	Manuel Jiménez García	(Mexico) Carlos Adrián Morales	Pirma	Banco Azteca
Querétaro	Marc Spiegel	(Mexico) Édgar Mejía	Keuka	Pedigree Petfoods
Santos Laguna	Aleco Irarragorri Kalb	(Mexico) Jhonathan Lazcano	Charly	Peñoles, Soriana
Tijuana	Jorge Hank Inzunsa	(Mexico) Fernando Samayoa	Reebok	Caliente
Toluca	Francisco Suinaga Conde	(France) Patrice Lair	New Balance	Arabela
UANL	Mauricio Culebro	(Spain) Pedro Martínez Losa	Adidas	Cemex
UNAM	Luis Raúl González	(Mexico) Roberto Medina	Nike	DHL Express, Mifel

== Format ==
- The Liga MX Femenil season is split into two championships: the Torneo Apertura 2025 (opening tournament) and the Torneo Clausura 2026 (closing tournament). Each is contested in an identical format and includes the same eighteen teams.
- Since 2019–20 season the teams compete in a single group, the best eight of the general table qualify to the championship playoffs.

== Torneo Apertura ==
The Torneo Apertura 2025 is the first tournament of the season. The tournament began on 11 July 2025.

=== Regular season ===
==== Standings ====
Pos	Team	Pld	W	D	L	GF	GA	GD	Pts	Qualification or relegation
1	UANL	17	13	3	1	60	11	+49	42	Advance to Liguilla
2	Pachuca	17	13	3	1	60	20	+40	42	Advance to Liguilla
3	América	17	12	2	3	56	22	+34	38	Advance to Liguilla
4	Toluca	17	10	5	2	35	17	+18	35	Advance to Liguilla
5	Guadalajara	17	10	3	4	29	17	+12	33	Advance to Liguilla
6	Monterrey	17	10	2	5	38	24	+14	32	Advance to Liguilla
7	Cruz Azul	17	8	4	5	42	27	+15	28	Advance to Liguilla
8	Juárez	17	7	6	4	24	17	+7	27	Advance to Liguilla
9	León	17	8	3	6	32	33	−1	27	
10	Atlético San Luis	17	7	4	6	24	27	−3	25	
11	UNAM	17	7	2	8	35	32	+3	23	
12	Atlas	17	6	4	7	28	33	−5	22	
13	Tijuana	17	4	3	10	19	33	−14	15	
14	Querétaro	17	3	4	10	17	50	−33	13	
15	Santos Laguna	17	3	3	11	19	40	−21	12	
16	Necaxa	17	2	2	13	9	40	−31	8	
17	Puebla	17	1	3	13	8	43	−35	6	
18	Mazatlán	17	0	2	15	9	58	−49	2	

Source: Liga MX Femenil
Rules for classification: 1) Points; 2) Goal difference; 3) Number of goals scored; 4) Head-to-head results between tied teams; 5) Number of goals scored away; 6) Highest relegation coefficient; 7) Fair Play points

==== Positions by round ====
Qualification to quarter-finals
Last place in table

Team ╲ Round	1	2	3	4	5	6	7	8	9	10	11	12	13	14	15	16	17
UANL	13	3	4	2	2	2	3	2	2	1	1	1	1	1	1	1	1
Pachuca	1	7	3	7	6	6	5	3	3	3	2	2	2	2	2	2	2
América	4	1	1	1	1	1	1	1	1	2	3	3	3	3	3	3	3
Toluca	6	6	6	4	4	3	2	4	4	4	4	4	5	5	5	4	4
Guadalajara	3	2	2	6	8	8	7	8	10	8	6	5	4	4	4	5	5
Monterrey	18	10	7	5	5	5	4	5	6	7	5	7	6	7	6	6	6
Cruz Azul	15	9	11	13	12	10	11	11	11	11	12	12	12	9	7	7	7
Juárez	11	5	8	8	7	7	8	7	8	9	8	8	10	11	9	8	8
León	10	4	9	9	10	9	10	10	9	10	9	6	9	6	8	9	9
Atlético San Luis	16	17	13	14	9	11	9	9	7	6	10	10	8	10	11	12	10
UNAM	2	8	5	3	3	4	6	6	5	5	7	9	7	8	10	10	11
Atlas	8	15	10	10	11	12	12	12	12	12	11	11	11	12	12	11	12
Tijuana	9	14	16	15	15	15	16	16	13	14	13	13	13	13	14	13	13
Querétaro	12	13	14	16	16	16	15	15	16	17	17	15	16	14	13	14	14
Santos Laguna	7	12	15	11	13	13	14	14	15	15	15	16	14	15	15	15	15
Necaxa	5	11	12	12	14	14	13	13	14	13	14	14	15	16	16	16	16
Puebla	17	18	17	17	17	17	17	17	18	16	16	17	17	17	17	17	17
Mazatlán	14	16	18	18	18	18	18	18	17	18	18	18	18	18	18	18	18

Updated to match(es) played on 1 November 2025. Source: Liga MX Femenil

==== Results ====
Each team plays once all other teams in 17 rounds regardless of it being a home or away match.

Home \ Away	AME	ATL	ASL	CAZ	GUA	JUA	LEO	MAZ	MON	NEC	PAC	PUE	QUE	SAN	TIJ	TOL	UNL	UNM
América	—	—	2–2	2–1	0–2	4–0	—	—	—	—	—	3–0	11–0	6–3	2–0	—	1–2	—
Atlas	2–3	—	—	—	0–2	—	2–4	2–1	—	—	—	2–0	6–2	—	—	2–2	0–3	—
Atlético San Luis	—	0–0	—	—	0–2	0–2	0–3	1–1	0–3	3–0	—	—	—	3–1	—	1–1	—	—
Cruz Azul	—	4–0	0–1	—	—	0–2	1–2	—	4–0	—	—	—	—	4–1	4–3	4–3	2–2	—
Guadalajara	—	—	—	1–1	—	1–0	—	—	1–1	4–0	—	1–1	—	—	2–0	—	2–4	4–3
Juárez	—	1–1	—	—	—	—	—	2–1	—	2–1	2–3	2–0	4–0	—	2–0	0–0	0–0	—
León	0–3	—	—	—	1–2	3–2	—	—	—	—	2–5	—	2–2	5–0	1–1	—	—	2–0
Mazatlán	1–5	—	—	1–4	0–1	—	1–3	—	—	—	0–9	1–1	0–3	—	0–3	—	—	0–4
Monterrey	1–2	2–1	—	—	—	1–1	3–1	5–0	—	—	0–2	—	4–2	3–1	—	—	—	—
Necaxa	0–4	0–1	—	3–3	—	—	1–1	2–1	0–5	—	—	0–1	—	—	—	0–2	—	—
Pachuca	3–2	3–1	5–0	2–2	2–1	—	—	—	—	5–0	—	—	—	3–1	—	1–2	—	1–1
Puebla	—	—	0–6	0–3	—	—	0–2	—	0–5	—	1–5	—	—	—	1–2	—	0–3	1–2
Querétaro	—	—	0–2	1–4	0–1	—	—	—	—	1–0	2–2	1–1	—	1–1	—	—	0–7	2–1
Santos Laguna	—	1–2	—	—	2–1	0–0	—	2–1	—	1–2	—	1–0	—	—	—	—	0–2	3–5
Tijuana	—	2–2	1–2	—	—	—	—	—	1–4	1–0	1–6	—	2–0	1–1	—	1–3	—	—
Toluca	3–3	—	—	—	2–1	—	1–0	6–0	0–1	—	—	4–1	2–0	1–0	—	—	—	—
UANL	—	—	5–1	—	—	—	9–0	5–0	4–0	4–0	2–3	—	—	—	2–0	1–1	—	5–1
UNAM	2–3	3–4	1–2	3–1	—	2–2	—	—	4–0	1–0	—	—	—	—	1–0	1–2	—	—

Updated to match(es) played on 1 November 2025. Source: Liga MX Femenil
Legend: Blue = home team win; Yellow = draw; Red = away team win.
For upcoming matches, an "a" indicates there is an article about the rivalry between the two participants.

=== Regular season statistics ===
==== Top goalscorers ====
Players sorted first by goals scored, then by last name.

Rank	Player	Club	Goals
1	(Mexico) Charlyn Corral	Pachuca	22
2	(United States) Aerial Chavarin	Cruz Azul	18
3	(Mexico) Montserrat Saldivar	América	15
4	(Spain) Jennifer Hermoso	UANL	14
4	(Mexico) Diana Ordóñez	UANL	14
4	(Portugal) Stephanie Ribeiro	UNAM	14
7	(France) Eugénie Le Sommer	Toluca	13
8	(Mexico) Kiana Palacios	América	12
9	(El Salvador) Brenda Cerén	Atlas	11
10	(Mexico) Alicia Cervantes	Guadalajara	10

Source:Liga MX Femenil

==== Hat-tricks ====
Player	For	Against	Result	Date	Round	Ref
(United States) Aerial Chavarin	Cruz Azul	Atlas	4 – 0 (H)	19 July 2025	2	
(Mexico) Charlyn Corral	Pachuca	Mazatlán	0 – 9 (A)	28 July 2025	3	
(Australia) Emily Gielnik	Monterrey	Puebla	0 – 5 (A)	3 August 2025	4	
(Mexico) Montserrat Saldívar^{4}	América	Querétaro	11 – 0 (H)	3 August 2025	4	
(Mexico) Kiana Palacios	América	Querétaro	11 – 0 (H)	3 August 2025	4	
(France) Eugénie Le Sommer	Toluca	Cruz Azul	3 – 4 (A)	26 August 2025	8	
(United States) Becky Contreras	Puebla	Atlético San Luis	0 – 6 (A)	31 August 2025	9	
(Portugal) Stephanie Ribeiro	UNAM	Santos Laguna	3 – 5 (A)	1 September 2025	9	
(Mexico) Charlyn Corral^{4}	Pachuca	Necaxa	5 – 0 (H)	14 September 2025	11	
(Spain) Jennifer Hermoso^{4}	UANL	León	9 – 0 (H)	26 September 2025	11	
(France) Amandine Henry	Toluca	Mazatlán	6 – 0 (H)	4 October 2025	12	
(Mexico) Charlyn Corral	Pachuca	Atlético San Luis	5 – 0 (H)	5 October 2025	12	

^{4} Player scored four goals
(H) – Home; (A) – Away

- First goal of the season:
  (Mexico) Samantha Calvillo for Necaxa against Mazatlán (11 July 2025)
- Last goal of the season:
  (Mexico) Kiana Palacios for América against Mazatlán (1 November 2025)

=== Discipline ===
==== Team ====
- Most yellow cards: 42
  - Atlético San Luis
- Most red cards: 4
  - 5 teams tied
- Fewest yellow cards: 17
  - América
- Fewest red cards: 0
  - Atlas
  - UNAM

Source Liga MX Femenil

=== Attendance ===
NOTE: Information on some Cruz Azul and Querétaro matches is unavailable.

==== Per team ====
Pos	Team	Total	High	Low	Average	Change
1	UANL	48,418	16,884	3,155	5,380	+28.0%
2	Monterrey	30,690	6,517	2,435	3,836	−50.3%
3	América	29,387	6,606	1,865	3,265	+1.0%
4	UNAM	27,904	11,390	700	3,100	−17.1%
5	Guadalajara	24,653	5,358	728	3,082	−32.8%
6	Toluca	20,023	5,452	24	2,503	−24.4%
7	Pachuca	17,504	3,338	453	1,945	−40.4%
8	Tijuana	12,964	6,733	733	1,621	+78.5%
9	Juárez	11,444	1,859	401	1,272	−25.1%
10	León	8,189	3,854	308	1,024	−12.8%
11	Atlas	7,948	3,274	147	994	+57.0%
12	Atlético San Luis	7,738	1,853	393	860	+8.9%
13	Necaxa	5,952	2,694	223	744	−17.2%
14	Puebla	3,420	939	84	570	+29.3%
15	Mazatlán	3,684	1,226	166	461	+61.2%
16	Santos Laguna	3,258	999	198	407	−22.9%
17	Cruz Azul	1,075	318	235	269	+18.5%
18	Querétaro	871	321	113	218	−67.3%^{1}
	League total	269,183	16,884	24	1,807	−12.6%

Source: Liga MX
Notes:
Only regular season listed
1: Querétaro played the match against Necaxa behind closed doors.

Source: Liga MX Femenil

==== Highest and lowest ====
Highest attended					Lowest attended			
Week	Home	Score	Away	Attendance	Home	Score	Away	Attendance
1	UANL	1–1	Toluca	6,022	Necaxa	2–1	Mazatlán	396
2	Toluca	1–0	Santos Laguna	3,596	Querétaro	0–1	Guadalajara	113
3	Guadalajara	1–0	Juárez	5,358	Cruz Azul	0–1	Atlético San Luis	318
4	Tijuana	2–2	Atlas	6,733	Necaxa	1–1	León	527
5	Monterrey	5–0	Mazatlán	4,283	Querétaro	0–2	Atlético San Luis	321
6	Toluca	2–1	Guadalajara	3,985	Cruz Azul	4–0	Monterrey	282
7	UNAM	2–3	América	11,390	Mazatlán	1–1	Puebla	254
8	Guadalajara	1–1	Monterrey	2,671	Querétaro	0–7	UANL	141
9	Guadalajara	2–4	UANL	5,274	Atlas	2–1	Mazatlán	147
10	UANL	4–0	Monterrey	16,884	Necaxa	0–1	Puebla	223
11	América	0–2	Guadalajara	6,606	Mazatlán	0–3	Tijuana	166
12	Toluca	3–3	América	5,452	Puebla	0–3	Cruz Azul	84
13	UANL	9–0	León	3,155	Santos Laguna	1–0	Puebla	198
14	Monterrey	1–2	América	6,517	Toluca	6–0	Mazatlán	24
15	América	1–2	UANL	5,123	Cruz Azul	4–1	Santos Laguna	235
16	UANL	5–1	Atlético San Luis	3,741	Santos Laguna	2–1	Mazatlán	324
17	Monterrey	2–1	Atlas	2,435	Cruz Azul	2–2	UANL	240

Source: Liga MX

1. Does not include matches played behind closed doors and matches without attendance data.

=== Liguilla ===
The eight best teams play two games against each other on a home-and-away basis. The higher seeded teams play on their home field during the second leg. The winner of each match up is determined by aggregate score. In the quarterfinals and semifinals, if the two teams are tied on aggregate, the higher seeded team advances. In the final, if the two teams are tied after both legs, the match goes to a penalty shoot-out.

Quarter-finals
1	UANL	1	0	1
8	Juárez	0	0	0
2	Pachuca	2	0	2
7	Cruz Azul	1	5	6
3	América	1	5	6
6	Monterrey	1	0	1
4	Toluca	2	0	2
5	Guadalajara	2	2	4

Semi-finals
1	UANL	1	2	3
7	Cruz Azul	1	1	2
3	América	2	2	4
5	Guadalajara	0	0	0

Final
1	UANL	3	1	4
3	América	3	0	3

==== Quarter-finals ====
The first legs were played on 5 and 6 November, and the second legs were played on 8 and 9 November 2025.

Team 1	Agg.	Team 2	1st leg	2nd leg
UANL	1–0	Juárez	1–0	0–0
Pachuca	2–6	Cruz Azul	2–1	0–5
América	6–1	Monterrey	1–1	5–0
Toluca	2–4	Guadalajara	2–2	0–2

Matches

6 November 2025
17:30 MST (UTC−7)

Juárez	0–1	UANL
	Report	Mayor 23'

Estadio Olímpico Benito Juárez, Ciudad Juárez
Referee: Alfredo Huerta López (Mexico City)
9 November 2025
17:00 CST (UTC−6)

UANL	0–0	Juárez
	Report

Estadio Universitario, San Nicolás de los Garza
Referee: Figo Rodolfo López (Sinaloa)

UANL won 1–0 on aggregate.

5 November 2025
18:00 CST (UTC−6)

Cruz Azul	1–2	Pachuca
Chavarin 10'	Report	Corral 14', 31'

Estadio Olímpico Universitario, Mexico City
Referee: Cesia Deysire Campos (Coahuila)
8 November 2025
21:00 CST (UTC−6)

Pachuca	0–5	Cruz Azul
	Report	Martínez 39'; Rodriguez 51'; Blackwood 59'; Calderón 83'; Chavarin 90+4'

Estadio Hidalgo, Pachuca
Referee: Erika Monserrat González (Durango)

Cruz Azul won 2–6 on aggregate.

6 November 2025
19:15 CST (UTC−6)

Monterrey	1–1	América
Seoposenwe 90+6'	Report	Guerrero 40'

Estadio BBVA, Guadalupe
Referee: Priscila Eritzel Pérez (Guanajuato)
9 November 2025
19:15 CST (UTC−6)

América	5–0	Monterrey
Camberos 27', 45'; Palacios 40'; Vilamala 65'; Cabanillas 88'	Report

Estadio Ciudad de los Deportes, Mexico City
Referee: Ximena Márquez Ruíz (Mexico City)

América won 6–1 on aggregate.

6 November 2025
21:00 CST (UTC−6)

Guadalajara	2–2	Toluca
Cervantes 15', 65'	Report	Robert 52', 86'

Estadio Akron, Zapopan
Referee: Francia María González (Guanajuato)
9 November 2025
21:15 CST (UTC−6)

Toluca	0–2	Guadalajara
	Report	Cervantes 34', 82'

Estadio Nemesio Díez, Toluca
Referee: Montserrat Pérez Comellas (Puebla)

Guadalajara won 2–4 on aggregate.

==== Semi-finals ====
The first legs were played on 13 November, and the second legs were played on 16 November 2025.

Team 1	Agg.	Team 2	1st leg	2nd leg
UANL	3–2	Cruz Azul	1–1	2–1
América	4–0	Guadalajara	2–0	2–0

13 November 2025
18:00 CST (UTC−6)

Cruz Azul	1–1	UANL
García 74'	Report	Olivieri 45+3'

Estadio Olímpico Universitario, Mexico City
Referee: Ximena Márquez Ruíz (Mexico City)
16 November 2025
17:00 CST (UTC−6)

UANL	2–1	Cruz Azul
Hermoso 16' (pen.); Ordóñez 64'	Report	Blackwood 89' (pen.)

Estadio Universitario, San Nicolás de los Garza
Referee: Priscila Eritzel Pérez (Guanajuato)

UANL won 3–2 on aggregate.

13 November 2025
20:07 CST (UTC−6)

Guadalajara	0–2	América
	Report	Camberos 2'; Kimberly Rodríguez 57'

Estadio Akron, Zapopan
Referee: Erika Monserrat González (Durango)
16 November 2025
19:00 CST (UTC−6)

América	2–0	Guadalajara
Hernández 32'; Guerrero 56'	Report

Estadio Ciudad de los Deportes, Mexico City
Referee: Francia María González (Guanajuato)

América won 4–0 on aggregate.

==== Final ====
The first leg was played on 20 November, and the secon leg was played on 23 November 2025.

Team 1	Agg.	Team 2	1st leg	2nd leg
UANL	4–3	América	3–3	1–0

20 November 2025
20:00 CST (UTC−6)

América	3–3	UANL
Guerrero 17'; Camberos 21'; Luebbert 44'	Report	Mayor 62'; Kgatlana 76'; Jheniffer 83'

Estadio Ciudad de los Deportes, Mexico City
Referee: Erika Monserrat González (Durango)
23 November 2025
17:00 CST (UTC−6)

UANL	1–0	América
Ordóñez 20'	Report

Estadio Universitario, San Nicolás de los Garza
Referee: Francia María González (Guanajuato)

UANL won 4–3 on aggregate.

== Torneo Clausura ==
The Torneo Clausura 2026 is the second tournament of the season. The tournament began on 4 January 2026.

=== Changes ===
- On 15 December 2025, Cruz Azul was relocated from Mexico City to Cuernavaca, Morelos.

=== Regular season ===
==== Standings ====
Pos	Team	Pld	W	D	L	GF	GA	GD	Pts	Qualification or relegation
1	América	17	13	3	1	44	13	+31	42	Advance to Liguilla
2	Monterrey	17	12	4	1	39	8	+31	40	Advance to Liguilla
3	UANL	17	11	4	2	41	13	+28	37	Advance to Liguilla
4	Pachuca	17	11	3	3	46	15	+31	36	Advance to Liguilla
5	Guadalajara	17	9	7	1	27	13	+14	34	Advance to Liguilla
6	Toluca	17	10	3	4	38	26	+12	33	Advance to Liguilla
7	Cruz Azul	17	9	4	4	38	19	+19	31	Advance to Liguilla
8	Juárez	17	8	5	4	27	18	+9	29	Advance to Liguilla
9	Tijuana	17	8	4	5	31	23	+8	28	
10	UNAM	17	6	4	7	23	29	−6	22	
11	Atlético San Luis	17	6	3	8	20	32	−12	21	
12	Mazatlán	17	5	3	9	19	27	−8	18	
13	León	17	4	4	9	32	35	−3	16	
14	Atlas	17	3	3	11	22	40	−18	12	
15	Puebla	17	3	2	12	11	46	−35	11	
16	Santos Laguna	17	2	3	12	14	29	−15	9	
17	Querétaro	17	1	2	14	11	46	−35	5	
18	Necaxa	17	1	1	15	11	62	−51	4	

Source: Liga MX Femenil
Rules for classification: 1) Points; 2) Goal difference; 3) Number of goals scored; 4) Head-to-head results between tied teams; 5) Number of goals scored away; 6) Highest relegation coefficient; 7) Fair Play points

==== Positions by round ====
Qualification to quarter-finals
Last place in table

Team ╲ Round	1	2	3	4	5	6	7	8	9	10	11	12	13	14	15	16	17
América	9	8	3	2	1	1	4	2	3	5	5	4	4	2	2	2	1
Monterrey	2	1	1	1	2	2	1	1	1	1	1	1	1	1	1	1	2
UANL	3	9	10	9	7	8	6	7	6	6	6	3	3	5	4	4	3
Pachuca	5	2	7	5	5	5	5	3	4	2	2	2	2	4	3	3	4
Guadalajara	7	7	6	4	4	3	2	4	2	3	4	5	6	6	6	5	5
Toluca	6	3	2	6	6	4	3	5	5	4	3	6	5	3	5	6	6
Cruz Azul	1	5	5	8	9	7	8	9	9	8	7	7	7	7	7	7	7
Juárez	10	10	8	7	8	10	9	8	8	10	10	8	9	9	8	8	8
Tijuana	12	11	11	11	10	9	10	10	11	9	9	9	8	8	9	9	9
UNAM	4	6	4	3	3	6	7	6	7	7	8	11	11	10	10	10	10
Atlético San Luis	13	12	12	14	14	13	15	16	16	16	14	13	13	13	13	12	11
Mazatlán	8	4	9	10	11	11	11	11	12	11	11	10	10	11	11	11	12
León	18	16	13	12	12	12	12	12	10	12	12	12	12	12	12	13	13
Atlas	16	15	16	15	15	14	13	14	14	15	13	14	14	14	14	14	14
Puebla	17	14	15	17	17	17	14	13	13	13	15	15	15	15	15	15	15
Santos Laguna	11	13	14	13	13	15	16	15	15	14	16	16	16	16	16	16	16
Querétaro	14	17	17	16	16	16	17	17	17	18	18	18	18	17	17	17	17
Necaxa	15	18	18	18	18	18	18	18	18	17	17	17	17	18	18	18	18

Updated to match(es) played on 25 April 2026. Source: Liga MX Femenil

==== Results ====
Each team plays once all other teams in 17 rounds regardless of it being a home or away match.

Home \ Away	AME	ATL	ASL	CAZ	GUA	JUA	LEO	MAZ	MON	NEC	PAC	PUE	QUE	SAN	TIJ	TOL	UNL	UNM
América	—	2–0	—	—	—	—	4–2	4–0	1–1	6–0	3–2	—	—	—	—	2–0	—	5–1
Atlas	—	—	2–2	4–6	—	1–2	—	—	0–3	3–2	0–3	—	—	1–1	1–2	—	—	4–1
Atlético San Luis	0–2	—	—	3–2	—	—	—	—	—	—	0–3	2–0	4–1	—	2–3	—	0–2	1–1
Cruz Azul	1–2	—	—	—	0–0	—	—	1–0	—	3–0	1–0	4–0	3–1	—	—	—	—	1–1
Guadalajara	3–2	4–2	2–0	—	—	—	3–1	1–0	—	—	1–1	—	2–0	1–0	—	1–1	—	—
Juárez	1–1	—	1–0	1–1	1–1	—	1–0	—	1–1	—	—	—	—	2–0	—	—	—	1–1
León	—	4–0	1–2	0–5	—	—	—	1–3	1–1	3–1	—	6–0	—	—	—	3–3	1–1	—
Mazatlán	—	1–1	0–1	—	—	3–2	—	—	0–2	5–0	—	—	—	2–1	—	2–3	0–0	—
Monterrey	—	—	6–0	2–1	0–0	—	—	—	—	5–0	—	4–0	—	—	2–0	2–0	0–3	3–0
Necaxa	—	—	1–1	—	0–2	0–6	—	—	—	—	0–6	—	2–1	0–2	1–6	—	1–4	0–1
Pachuca	—	—	—	—	—	3–0	5–4	3–0	0–1	—	—	7–0	4–0	—	2–0	—	2–2	—
Puebla	0–3	2–1	—	—	1–3	0–2	—	1–2	—	3–2	—	—	0–0	2–0	—	0–1	—	—
Querétaro	1–4	0–1	—	—	—	2–1	2–3	1–1	0–1	—	—	—	—	—	0–3	1–4	—	—
Santos Laguna	1–2	—	1–2	0–2	—	—	0–0	—	1–5	—	1–2	—	3–0	—	2–2	0–1	—	—
Tijuana	0–0	—	—	1–1	1–1	1–2	2–1	2–0	—	—	—	3–0	—	—	—	—	0–2	2–1
Toluca	—	2–0	4–0	0–4	—	3–2	—	—	—	5–1	1–1	—	—	—	5–3	—	1–2	4–2
UANL	0–1	3–1	—	4–2	2–2	0–1	—	—	—	—	—	4–0	6–0	4–1	—	—	—	—
UNAM	—	—	—	—	1–0	—	2–1	3–0	—	—	1–2	2–2	4–1	1–0	—	—	0–2	—

Updated to match(es) played on 25 April 2026. Source: Liga MX Femenil
Legend: Blue = home team win; Yellow = draw; Red = away team win.
For upcoming matches, an "a" indicates there is an article about the rivalry between the two participants.

=== Regular season statistics ===
==== Top goalscorers ====
Players sorted first by goals scored, then by last name.

Rank	Player	Club	Goals
1	(France) Eugénie Le Sommer	Toluca	18
1	(Mexico) Diana Ordóñez	UANL	18
3	(Mexico) Charlyn Corral	Pachuca	14
4	(Nigeria) Uchenna Kanu	Cruz Azul	10
4	(United States) Angelina Hix	UNAM	10
6	(Spain) Lucía García	Monterrey	9
7	(Mexico) Christina Burkenroad	Monterrey	8
7	(Spain) Irene Guerrero	América	8
9	(Mexico) Nancy Antonio	América	7
9	(El Salvador) Brenda Cerén	Atlas	7
9	(Turkey) Kader Hançar	Tijuana	7
9	(Brazil) Jheniffer	UANL	7
9	(Argentina) Nina Nicosia	Pachuca	7
9	(Guatemala) Aisha Solórzano	Juárez	7

Source:Liga MX Femenil

==== Hat-tricks ====
Player	For	Against	Result	Date	Round	Ref
(United States) Angelina Hix	UNAM	Querétaro	4 – 1 (H)	4 January 2026	1	
(Mexico) Diana Ordóñez^{4}	UANL	Necaxa	1 – 4 (A)	4 January 2026	1	
(France) Eugénie Le Sommer	Toluca	Tijuana	5 – 3 (H)	5 January 2026	1	
(Mexico) Charlyn Corral	Pachuca	Puebla	7 – 0 (H)	21 January 2026	4	
(Mexico) Charlyn Corral	Pachuca	Necaxa	0 – 6 (A)	26 January 2026	5	
(Mexico) Scarlett Camberos	América	UNAM	5 – 1 (H)	1 February 2026	6	
(Mexico) Diana Ordóñez	UANL	Querétaro	6 – 0 (H)	15 March 2026	12	
(France) Eugénie Le Sommer	Toluca	Necaxa	5 – 1 (H)	20 March 2026	13	
(Australia) Emily Gielnik	Monterrey	UNAM	3 – 0 (H)	1 April 2026	15	
(Nigeria) Uchenna Kanu	Cruz Azul	Toluca	0 – 4 (A)	4 April 2026	16	

^{4} Player scored four goals
(H) – Home; (A) – Away

- First goal of the season:
  (Mexico) Jasmine Casarez for Guadalajara against Atlético San Luis (4 January 2026)
- Last goal of the season:
  (Mexico) Mayra Santana for Santos Laguna against Querétaro (25 April 2026)

=== Discipline ===
==== Team ====
- Most yellow cards: 44
  - Tijuana
- Most red cards: 4
  - Atlético San Luis
  - Santos Laguna
- Fewest yellow cards: 17
  - Pachuca
- Fewest red cards: 0
  - 5 teams tied

Source Liga MX Femenil

=== Attendance ===
NOTE: Information on some Puebla matches is unavailable.

==== Per team ====
Pos	Team	Total	High	Low	Average	Change
1	Monterrey	72,247	27,408	2,044	8,027	+109.3%
2	Guadalajara	44,840	15,735	1,522	4,982	+61.6%
3	UANL	33,018	6,331	2,635	4,127	−23.3%
4	América	30,739	7,410	2,408	3,842	+17.7%
5	Cruz Azul	29,561	8,496	1,246	3,695	+1,273.6%^{1}
6	UNAM	21,263	4,790	1,700	2,658	−14.3%
7	Toluca	21,852	3,413	1,727	2,428	−3.0%
8	Pachuca	17,333	6,422	1,059	2,167	+11.4%
9	Tijuana	16,197	4,133	733	1,800	+11.0%
10	Atlético San Luis	12,540	3,749	771	1,568	+82.3%
11	Juárez	11,233	2,658	715	1,404	+10.4%
12	León	7,211	1,858	217	801	−21.8%
13	Necaxa	6,495	2,084	166	722	−3.0%
14	Querétaro	5,264	831	281	658	+201.8%
15	Puebla	5,083	3,584	48	635	+11.4%^{2}
16	Santos Laguna	5,034	2,052	141	559	+37.3%
17	Mazatlán	3,655	1,082	104	457	−0.9%
18	Atlas	3,126	488	249	347	−65.1%
	League total	346,691	27,408	48	2,281	+26.2%

Source: Liga MX
Notes:
Only regular season listed
1: Cruz Azul played the last tournament at Instalaciones La Noria, Mexico City.
2: Since Week 5 Puebla was moved to Club Alpha 3 due to poor pitch conditions in the Estadio Cuauhtémoc. However, they continued to play high-profile matches at the stadium.

Source: Liga MX Femenil

==== Highest and lowest ====
Highest attended					Lowest attended			
Week	Home	Score	Away	Attendance	Home	Score	Away	Attendance
1	Monterrey	4–0	Puebla	4,615	Mazatlán	3–2	Juárez	200
2	Cruz Azul	0–0	Guadalajara	8,496	Mazatlán	2–1	Santos Laguna	104
3	Cruz Azul	1–0	Pachuca	3,929	Atlas	1–2	Tijuana	379
4	Monterrey	2–1	Cruz Azul	3,898	Mazatlán	1–1	Atlas	274
5	América	4–0	Mazatlán	3,614	Puebla	1–3	Guadalajara	185
6	América	5–1	UNAM	7,410	Atlas	2–2	Atlético de San Luis	249
7	Monterrey	2–0	Tijuana	5,376	Puebla	2–0	Santos Laguna	148
8	Cruz Azul	1–2	América	7,525	León	3–1	Necaxa	217
9	Guadalajara	4–2	Atlas	5,084	León	6–0	Puebla	265
10	Guadalajara	3–2	América	15,735	Necaxa	2–1	Querétaro	166
11	América	4–2	León	2,913	Querétaro	0–1	Atlas	343
12	UANL	6–0	Querétaro	6,331	Puebla	0–2	Juárez	213
13	Monterrey	0–0	Guadalajara	9,312	Querétaro	0–3	Tijuana	363
14	Pachuca	0–1	Monterrey	6,422	Santos Laguna	1–2	Atlético San Luis	141
15	Monterrey	3–0	UNAM	8,703	Puebla	0–0	Querétaro	120
16	UANL	2–2	Guadalajara	4,792	Necaxa	1–6	Tijuana	248
17	Monterrey	0–3	UANL	27,408	Puebla	3–2	Necaxa	48

Source: Liga MX

1. Does not include matches played behind closed doors and matches without attendance data.

=== Liguilla ===
The eight best teams play two games against each other on a home-and-away basis. The higher seeded teams play on their home field during the second leg. The winner of each match up is determined by aggregate score. In the quarterfinals and semifinals, if the two teams are tied on aggregate, the higher seeded team advances. In the final, if the two teams are tied after both legs, the match goes to a penalty shoot-out.

Quarter-finals
1	América	1	3	4
8	Juárez	1	2	3
4	Pachuca	1	2	3
5	Guadalajara	2	0	2
2	Monterrey	1	4	5
7	Cruz Azul	1	0	1
3	UANL	1	1	2
6	Toluca	2	2	4

Semi-finals
1	América	7	4	11
6	Toluca	1	3	4
2	Monterrey	0	4	4
4	Pachuca	2	1	3

Final
1	América	0	3	3
2	Monterrey	1	0	1

==== Quarter-finals ====
The first legs were played on 29 and 30 April, and the second legs were played on 2 and 3 May 2026.

Team 1	Agg.	Team 2	1st leg	2nd leg
América	4–3	Juárez	1–1	3–2
Monterrey	5–1	Cruz Azul	1–1	4–0
UANL	2–4	Toluca	1–2	1–2
Pachuca	3–2	Guadalajara	1–2	2–0

Matches

29 April 2026
21:00 MDT (UTC−6)

Juárez	1–1	América
Mercado 13'	Report	Camberos 61'

Estadio Olímpico Benito Juárez, Ciudad Juárez
Referee: Priscila Eritzel Pérez (Guanajuato)
2 May 2026
15:55 CST (UTC−6)

América	3–2	Juárez
Guerrero 42' (pen.) 90+2'; Camberos 72'	Report	Solórzano 22'; Kaci 57'

Estadio Ciudad de los Deportes, Mexico City
Referee: Itzel Hernández Fuentes (Oaxaca)

América won 4–3 on aggregate.

29 April 2026
19:00 CST (UTC−6)

Cruz Azul	1–1	Monterrey
Kanu 89' (pen.)	Report	Del Campo 17'

Estadio Centenario, Cuernavaca
Referee: María Fernanda Márquez (Sinaloa)
2 May 2026
18:15 CST (UTC−6)

Monterrey	4–0	Cruz Azul
Restrepo 24'; García 53', 55', 64'	Report

Estadio BBVA, Guadalupe
Referee: Fernando Alexis Portillo (Chihuahua)

Monterrey won 5–1 on aggregate.

30 April 2026
21:00 CST (UTC−6)

Toluca	2–1	UANL
Le Sommer 66'; Robert 78'	Report	Ordóñez 43'

Estadio Nemesio Díez, Toluca
Referee: Diana Velázquez Lomelí (Aguascalientes)
3 May 2026
19:00 CST (UTC−6)

UANL	1–2	Toluca
Ordónez 80' (pen.)	Report	Guatemala 29'; Robert 52' (pen.)

Estadio Universitario, San Nicolás de los Garza
Referee: Alfredo Huerta López (Mexico City)

Toluca won 4–2 on aggregate.

30 April 2026
19:07 CST (UTC−6)

Guadalajara	2–1	Pachuca
Cervantes 35'; Casarez 58'	Report	Pereira 77' (pen.)

Estadio Jalisco, Guadalajara
Referee: Fernanda Natasha Galán (Baja California)
3 May 2026
21:00 CST (UTC−6)

Pachuca	2–0	Guadalajara
Mauleón 39'; Corral 87'	Report

Estadio Hidalgo, Pachuca
Referee: Ana Paola Hernández (Aguascalientes)

Pachuca won 3–2 on aggregate.

==== Semi–finals ====
The first legs were played on 7 May, and the second legs were played on 10 May 2026.

Team 1	Agg.	Team 2	1st leg	2nd leg
América	11–4	Toluca	7–1	4–3
Monterrey	4–3	Pachuca	0–2	4–1

Matches

7 May 2026
21:00 CST (UTC−6)

Toluca	1–7	América
Erceg 20'	Report	Camberos 8'; Kimberly Rodríguez 13'; Geyse 23', 53'; Guerrero 37'; Antonio 63'; Aviléz 82'

Estadio Nemesio Díez, Toluca
Referee: Ana Paola Hernández (Aguascalientes)
10 May 2026
12:00 CST (UTC−6)

América	4–3	Toluca
García 4'; Guerrero 35'; Aviléz 75'; Soto 90'	Report	Robert 12', 20', 45+2'

Estadio Ciudad de los Deportes, Mexico City
Referee: Francia María González (Guanajuato)

América won 11–4 on aggregate.

7 May 2026
19:00 CST (UTC−6)

Pachuca	2–0	Monterrey
Gomes 10'; Corral 75'	Report

Estadio Hidalgo, Pachuca
Referee: Cesia Deysire Campos (Coahuila)
10 May 2026
18:15 CST (UTC−6)

Monterrey	4–1	Pachuca
Ohale 37' (own); Vargas 52'; Burkenroad 59'; García 62'	Report	Mauleón 2'

Estadio BBVA, Guadalupe
Referee: Alfredo Huerta López (Mexico City)

Monterrey won 4–3 on aggregate.

==== Final ====
The first leg was played on 14 May, and the second leg was played on 17 May 2026.

Team 1	Agg.	Team 2	1st leg	2nd leg
América	3–1	Monterrey	0–1	3–0

Matches

14 May 2026
21:10 CST (UTC−6)

Monterrey	1–0	América
Soto 24'	Report

Estadio BBVA, Guadalupe
Referee: Ana Paola Hernández (Aguascalientes)
17 May 2026
12:00 CST (UTC−6)

América	3–0	Monterrey
Guerrero 43'; Geyse 50'; Camberos 80'	Report

Estadio Ciudad de los Deportes, Mexico City
Referee: Cesia Deysire Campos (Coahuila)

América won 3–1 on aggregate.

== Aggregate table 2025–26 ==
The aggregate table (the sum of points of both the Apertura 2025 and Clausura 2026 tournaments) will be used to determine seeds in the Campeón de Campeones and the place of best runner–up for the 2026–27 CONCACAF W Champions Cup.

Pos	Team	Pld	W	D	L	GF	GA	GD	Pts	Qualification
1	América (X)	34	25	5	4	100	35	+65	80	Qualification for the 2027 CONCACAF W Champions Cup
2	UANL (A)	34	24	7	3	101	24	+77	79	Qualification for the 2027 CONCACAF W Champions Cup
3	Pachuca	34	24	6	4	106	35	+71	78	
4	Monterrey (Y)	34	22	6	6	77	32	+45	72	Qualification for the 2027 CONCACAF W Champions Cup
5	Toluca	34	20	8	6	73	43	+30	68	
6	Guadalajara	34	19	10	5	56	30	+26	67	
7	Cruz Azul	34	17	8	9	80	46	+34	59	
8	Juárez	34	15	11	8	51	35	+16	56	
9	Atlético San Luis	34	13	7	14	44	59	−15	46	
10	UNAM	34	13	6	15	58	61	−3	45	
11	León	34	12	7	15	64	68	−4	43	
12	Tijuana	34	12	7	15	50	56	−6	43	
13	Atlas	34	9	7	18	50	73	−23	34	
14	Santos Laguna	34	5	6	23	33	69	−36	21	
15	Mazatlán	34	5	5	24	28	85	−57	20	
16	Querétaro	34	4	6	24	28	96	−68	18	
17	Puebla	34	4	5	25	19	89	−70	17	
18	Necaxa	34	3	3	28	20	102	−82	12	

Updated to match(es) played on 25 April 2026. Source: Liga MX Femenil
Rules for classification: 1) Points; 2) Goal difference; 3) Number of goals scored; 4) Head-to-head results between tied teams; 5) Number of goals scored away; 6) Highest relegation coefficient; 7) Fair Play points
(A) Apertura champion; (X) Clausura champion; (Y) Best season runner–up

== Aggregate table 2025 ==
The aggregate table (the sum of points of both the Clausura 2025 and Apertura 2025 tournaments).

Pos	Team	Pld	W	D	L	GF	GA	GD	Pts
1	Pachuca	34	24	8	2	100	34	+66	80
2	América	34	25	4	5	116	36	+80	79
3	UANL	34	22	7	5	101	25	+76	73
4	Monterrey	34	20	5	9	79	47	+32	65
5	Guadalajara	34	18	9	7	57	27	+30	63
6	UNAM	34	18	6	10	71	45	+26	60
7	Toluca	34	17	7	10	64	47	+17	58
8	Juárez	34	14	11	9	45	40	+5	53
9	Cruz Azul	34	14	9	11	75	45	+30	51
10	Atlas	34	15	5	14	58	55	+3	50
11	León	34	14	6	14	55	66	−11	48
12	Atlético San Luis	34	13	5	16	37	60	−23	44
13	Querétaro	34	9	10	15	35	76	−41	37
14	Tijuana	34	8	10	16	41	57	−16	34
15	Necaxa	34	6	3	25	22	79	−57	21
16	Santos Laguna	34	5	3	26	34	85	−51	18
17	Mazatlán	34	3	4	27	21	115	−94	13
18	Puebla	34	2	6	26	16	88	−72	12

Updated to match(es) played on 1 November 2025. Source: Liga MX Femenil
Rules for classification: 1) Points; 2) Goal difference; 3) Number of goals scored; 4) Head-to-head results between tied teams; 5) Number of goals scored away; 6) Highest relegation coefficient; 7) Fair Play points

== 2025 All-Star Game ==
On 21 July 2025, Liga MX Femenil and FC Barcelona announced that as part of Barcelona's pre-season summer tour in Mexico, the Spanish club would face a Liga MX Femenil All-Stars team at Estadio Universitario in San Nicolás de los Garza, Nuevo León on 22 August 2025.

2025 Liga MX Femenil All-Star Game
22 August 2025
20:30 UTC-6

Liga MX Femenil All-Stars (Mexico)	2–2	(Spain) Barcelona
Ribeiro 27'; Guerrero 81'	Report	Blackwood 28' (o.g.); Bonmati 57'
Penalties
Cervantes (penalty scored); Jaramillo (penalty missed); Bravo (penalty scored); Diana García (penalty scored); Ceceña (penalty missed)	3-4	Putellas (penalty scored); Pina (penalty scored); Torrejon (penalty scored); Bonmati (penalty scored)

Estadio Universitario, San Nicolás de los Garza, Nuevo León
Referee: Ana Karen Hernandez (Mexico)

== Campeón de Campeonas ==
The Campeón de Campeonas ("Champion of Women's Champions") is an annual championship game disputed between the two winning teams of the season's tournaments.

Campeon de Campeonas
26 July 2026
18:30 CDT (UTC−5)

América	1–1	UANL
Guerrero 11'	Report	Ordóñez 89'
Penalties
Guerrero (penalty scored); Camberos (penalty scored); Garcia (penalty scored); Antonio (penalty scored)	4–3	Ordóñez (penalty missed); Sanchez (penalty scored); Jheniffer (penalty scored); Mariza (penalty scored); Mayor (penalty missed)

Toyota Field, San Antonio, United States
Attendance: 6,515
Referee: Jamie Padilla (United States)

2025–26 winners

1st title
