= Karla Martínez =

Karla Martínez may refer to:

- Karla Martínez (TV presenter) (born 1976), Mexican TV presenter
- Karla Martínez (footballer) (born 1998), Mexican footballer
