= Andrea Hernández (footballer) =

Mexican footballer (born 1998)

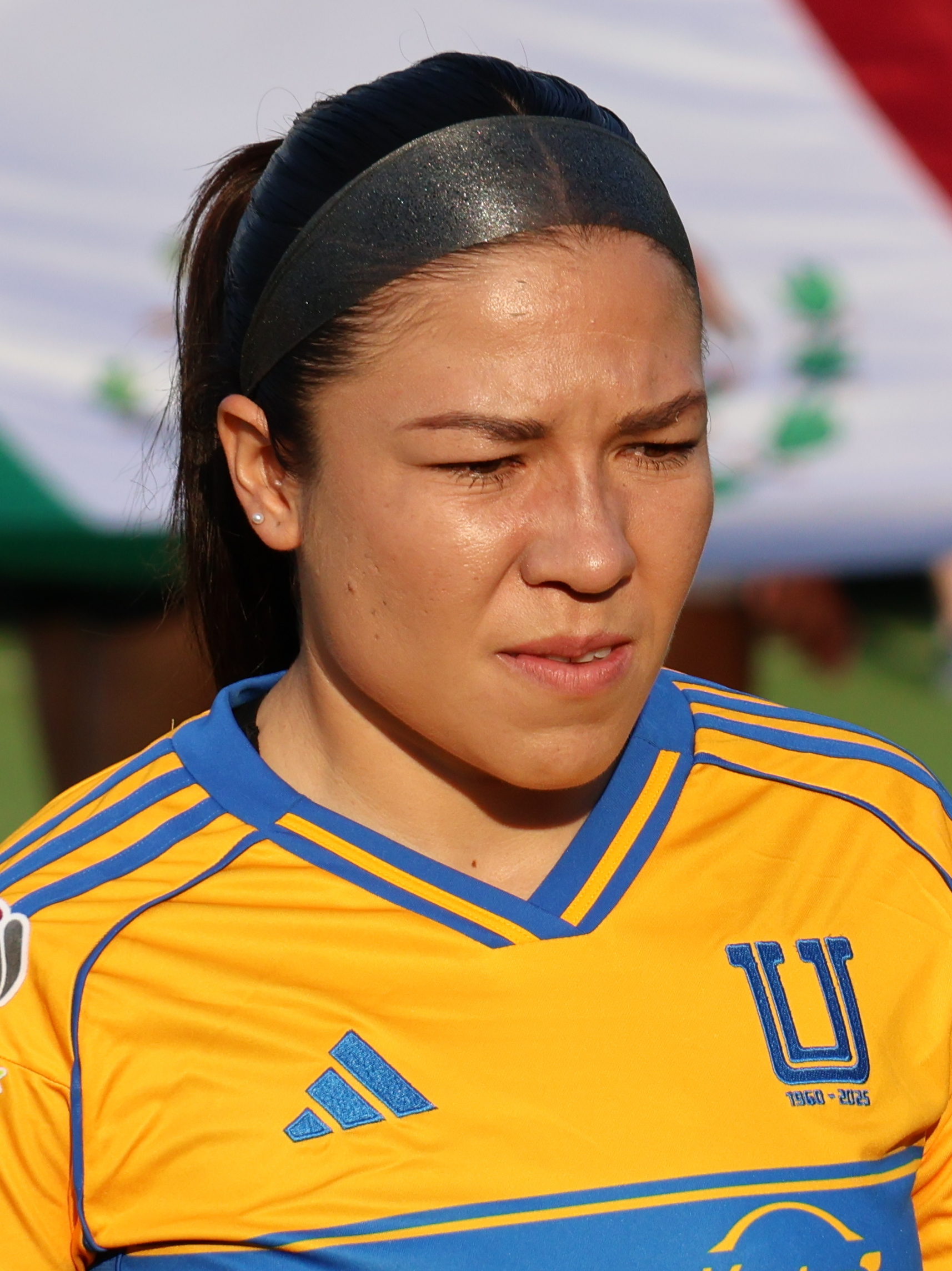
- Hernández with Tigres UANL in 2025

Personal information
- Full name: Andrea Hernández Buenosaires
- Date of birth: 20 January 1998 (age 28)
- Place of birth: Cuernavaca, Morelos, Mexico
- Height: 1.62 m (5 ft 4 in)
- Position: Defensive midfielder

Team information
- Current team: Atlas
- Number: 16

Senior career*
Years	Team	Apps	(Gls)
2017–2019	Toluca	50	(9)
2019–2021	Monterrey	46	(3)
2022–2024	Juárez	50	(4)
2024–2026	UANL	19	(0)
2026–	Atlas	0	(0)

International career^{‡}
2018	Mexico U-20		
2022–	Mexico	2	(1)
- * Club domestic league appearances and goals as of 2 September 2025 ‡ National team caps and goals as of 12 March 2022

Andrea Hernández Buenosaires (born 20 January 1998) is a Mexican professional footballer who plays as a midfielder for Liga MX Femenil club Tigres UANL.

== Career ==
=== Toluca (2017–2019) ===
In 2017, she started her career in Toluca.

=== Monterrey (2019–2021) ===
In 2019, she signed with Monterrey, where she won a championship.

=== Juárez (2022–2024) ===
In 2022, she signed with Juárez, becoming a benchmark and one of the most outstanding players in the history of the team.

== International career ==
Hernández represented Mexico at one CONCACAF Women's U-20 Championship edition (2018) and one FIFA U-20 Women's World Cup edition (2018). Hernández was part of the Mexico's team that played the Mexico Women's Tour 2023. She played the two Mexico's matches, and scored one goal.

== Career statistics ==
=== Club ===
As of match played 4 June 2023

Appearances and goals by club, season and competition
Club	Season	League			Total	
Club	Season	Division	Apps	Goals	Apps	Goals
Toluca	2017–18	Liga MX Femenil	25	2	25	2
Toluca	2018–19	Liga MX Femenil	25	7	25	7
Toluca	Total		50	9	50	9
Monterrey	2019–20	Liga MX Femenil	24	3	24	3
Monterrey	2020–21	Liga MX Femenil	19	0	19	0
Monterrey	2021–22	Liga MX Femenil	3	0	3	0
Monterrey	Total		46	3	14	3
Juárez	2021–22	Liga MX Femenil	15	1	15	1
Juárez	2022–23	Liga MX Femenil	34	3	34	3
Juárez	2023–24	Liga MX Femenil	1	0	1	0
Juárez	Total		50	4	50	4
Career total			146	16	146	16

== Honors and awards ==
Mexico U20

- CONCACAF Women's U-20 Championship: 2018
