= Toluca FC (women) =

Mexican professional women's football club

Toluca Femenil
- Full name: Deportivo Toluca Fútbol Club Femenil S.A. de C.V.
- Nickname: Diablas Rojas (Red Devils)
- Short name: TOL
- Founded: 2017; 9 years ago
- Ground: Nemesio Diez Stadium; Toluca, State of Mexico
- Capacity: 30,000
- Coordinates: 19°17′14″N 99°40′0″W
- Owner: Valentín Diez Morodo
- Chairman: Francisco Suinaga Conde
- Manager: Edgar Dueñas
- League: Liga Femenil
- Clausura 2026: Regular phase: 6th Final phase: Semi-finals
- Website: tolucafc.com
Home colours	Away colours	Third colours

Deportivo Toluca F.C. Femenil is a Mexican professional women's football club based in Toluca, State of Mexico. The club has been the women's section of the Toluca men's team since 2017 and is currently playing in the Liga Femenil. Its headquarters are located in Toluca, playing its home games at the Nemesio Diez Stadium.

== History ==
=== Foundation and Early Years (2016–2020) ===
Deportivo Toluca Femenil debuted in the Liga MX Femenil, Mexico’s first professional women’s football league, in 2017 as part of the creation of the league. The project was established by the Federación Mexicana de Fútbol (FMF) to integrate women’s teams within the existing Liga MX clubs and promote the development of women’s football nationwide. The league was officiated on December 5, 2016, when the Liga MX Owners' Assembly approved its creation. Following this mandate, which required every top-flight men's club to form a professional women's counterpart, Toluca established its women's squad. On April 26, 2017, the official group draw for the Copa de la Liga MX Femenil 2017 was held, revealing Toluca as one of the 12 pioneering clubs selected to participate in the pilot tournament.

The competition took place entirely at the Federación Mexicana de Fútbol (FMF) headquarters in Toluca from May 3 to May 6, 2017. On May 3, 2017, Toluca participated in the historic inaugural match of both the tournament and professional women's football in Mexico, defeating Monarcas Morelia 2–1. Midfielder Andrea Hernández scored the first official goal in the club's history during the game. Managed by Juan Carlos Mendoza, the team also defeated Cruz Azul 3–0 but missed the final after a 6–1 loss to eventual champions Pachuca. Toluca finished the tournament in third place overall with six points, establishing an early competitive foundation.

The club debuted in the Apertura 2017 season, competing in the inaugural campaign of the league. During its first tournaments, Toluca Femenil worked on consolidating its squad while adapting to the competitive structure of professional women’s football in Mexico.

During its early seasons, the club established a core roster of domestic players, highlighted by the emergence of forward Mariel Román. Joining the institution during its formative years and debuting at age 15, Román became the club's all-time leading goalscorer and recorded the first hat-trick in the history of the club.

One of the club’s earliest achievements came in the Clausura 2018 tournament, when Toluca Femenil reached the semifinals after finishing among the top teams in the regular season. The team was eventually eliminated by Monterrey, who advanced to the final.

In the following seasons, Toluca Femenil remained a consistent participant in the Liga MX Femenil, regularly competing for qualification to the Liguilla (playoffs). However, the team often faced early eliminations against established clubs such as Club América, Tigres UANL, and Pachuca.

The Clausura 2020 season was significantly affected by the COVID-19 pandemic, which led to the cancellation of the Clausura tournament and disruptions in squad continuity across the league. Following this period, Toluca Femenil underwent roster and coaching adjustments aimed at improving competitiveness.

Following the first seven matches of the Guard1anes 2020 tournament, Agustín Contreras left his position as Toluca Femenil manager for personal reasons. He was replaced on an interim basis by Alberto Cuate, who took charge beginning with the eighth matchday.

=== Return to the Playoffs (2021–2023) ===
In the Clausura 2021 and Apertura 2022 seasons, the team showed improvement, returning to playoff contention and achieving a quarterfinal appearance in the Apertura 2022, where they were eliminated by Tigres UANL.

In recent seasons, Toluca Femenil maintained a competitive position in the league, reaching the Liguilla in multiple tournaments, including Apertura 2023, while continuing to develop young talent within its squad structure.

=== International Recruitment and European Influence (2024–2025) ===
Ahead of the Apertura 2024 tournament, Toluca Femenil officially appointed French manager Patrice Lair as their new head coach. Lair arrived with an extensive résumé in European women's football, having previously won back-to-back UEFA Women's Champions League titles with Olympique Lyonnais, as well as directing clubs such as Paris Saint-Germain and Bordeaux.

Starting in the Apertura 2024 tournament, the club's board initiated an international restructuring of its squad under Patrice Lair, a period frequently described by the media as the "French formula". The first marquee signing was multi-time European champion Amandine Henry, who established herself as the team's midfield leader following her stint in the NWSL.

To bolster the defense, the club signed Abby Erceg. Ahead of the Apertura 2025, the project expanded with the additions of Faustine Robert and Eugénie Le Sommer, who finished as the league's top scorer in the Clausura 2026 with 18 goals.

=== Recent Seasons (2026–present) ===
In early 2026, Toluca Femenil completed another major transfer by signing Sofia Jakobsson, concluding one of the most ambitious periods of international recruitment in the club's history.

In the Clausura 2026, the club achieved one of its best playoff performances. In the quarter-finals, Toluca Femenil eliminated defending champions Tigres UANL with a 4–3 aggregate victory.

The club advanced to the semi-finals, where it was eliminated by América with a 10–4 aggregate score (7–1 in the first leg and 4–3 in the second leg).

At the end of the Clausura 2026 regular season, Patrice Lair announced his departure from the club, citing personal and family reasons for not renewing his contract.

In June 2026, Spanish manager Alberto Toril was appointed head coach ahead of the Apertura 2026 tournament.

In September 2026, Toluca announced the signing of Danish defender Katrine Veje, who joined the club from AS Roma for the Apertura 2026 tournament. Veje was signed to strengthen the team's defense and can also play as a full-back and on the wing.

On 7 October 2026, Toluca announced that Alberto Toril would leave the club after ten matches in charge of the Apertura 2026 tournament.

In October 10, 2026, Mexican manager Édgar Dueñas was appointed head coach ahead of the remainder of the Apertura 2026 tournament.

== Stadium ==
Deportivo Toluca Femenil plays its home matches at the Nemesio Diez Stadium, located in Toluca, State of Mexico. The stadium is shared with the men's team, Toluca, and is one of the oldest professional football venues in Mexico, having originally opened in 1954.

The stadium has undergone several renovations throughout its history. The most significant modern redevelopment took place between 2015 and 2017, when the venue was extensively rebuilt. The renovation included the demolition and reconstruction of stands, modernization of facilities, improved lighting systems, and the installation of a new roof covering most of the seating areas.

Following the renovation, the stadium’s capacity was increased to approximately 30,000 spectators. The redesign also aimed to improve visibility and bring fans closer to the pitch, creating a more compact and modern football environment.

The venue is notable for its high altitude, located at approximately 2,600 metres (8,530 ft) above sea level, making it one of the highest professional football stadiums in Mexico. This altitude often influences match conditions, particularly affecting visiting teams unaccustomed to thinner air.

For the Liga MX Femenil matches, Toluca Femenil regularly uses the stadium as its primary home venue, hosting regular season fixtures and occasional playoff matches. The stadium is considered an important home ground within the women’s league structure due to its infrastructure and historical significance within Mexican football.

=== Metepec Facilities ===
The Metepec Facilities are a sports complex operated by Deportivo Toluca F.C., located in Metepec, State of Mexico. The complex has been used by Deportivo Toluca Femenil for training and as an alternative venue for home matches since the team's establishment in 2017.

During the 2017 Apertura, the Metepec Facilities were used as a home venue during Toluca's inaugural season in the Liga MX Femenil. On 28 July 2017, Toluca played Cruz Azul Femenil there in its first league match, defeating Cruz Azul 2–1.

The facilities were also used for training during the team's inaugural season. In August 2017, Toluca Femenil held a training session in Metepec ahead of its match against Pumas UNAM Femenil.

During the 2018 Apertura, Toluca Femenil continued to use the Metepec Facilities for its preparation. The team held its preseason there before the start of the tournament.

For the 2019 Apertura, Toluca Femenil returned to the Metepec Facilities as a home venue after having played some of its previous home matches at the Estadio Nemesio Díez. The tournament schedule indicated that Toluca would move its home matches from the Nemesio Díez to the Metepec Facilities for the tournament.

The Metepec Facilities were also used as a home venue during the 2021 season. On 15 February 2021, Toluca Femenil hosted Cruz Azul Femenil at the complex in a league match that ended in a 1–1 draw.

In May 2021, Toluca also played the first leg of its quarter-final series against Guadalajara Femenil at the Metepec Facilities, losing 1–0.

In 2021, a report on a visit by representatives of the Global Football Alliance to Deportivo Toluca's facilities stated that the Metepec complex included facilities designated for the women's team, including changing rooms, a dining area and a gym.

== Support ==
Deportivo Toluca Femenil is supported by local fan groups, including women-led branches of the club's traditional barra, "La Perra Brava". These organized groups focus on supporting the women's team while also organizing family-oriented events and community support networks for female fans, aiming to increase female participation in Mexican football stands.

== Kit ==
=== Kit manufacturers and shirt sponsors ===
Period	Kit manufacturer	Shirt sponsor
2017–2023	(United States) Under Armour	(Mexico) Banamex
2023–2027	(United States) New Balance	(Mexico) Arabela

As of 2025, Toluca Femenil's kit is supplied by American sportswear company New Balance under a four-year contract signed in 2023, while Arabela is one of the team's main shirt sponsors. Arabela became an official sponsor of the women's team in 2021. In January 2024, Mexican company La Moderna became a sponsor of the team to support the development of its women's football program.

== Personnel ==
=== Management staff ===
Position	Staff
Owner	(Mexico) Valentín Diez Morodo
Sporting Chairman	(Mexico) Francisco Suinaga Conde
Sporting Director	(Brazil) Renato Luis Ferreira

=== Presidents ===
Name	Period
(Mexico) Francisco Suinaga Conde	2017–2023
(Mexico) Arturo Pérez Arredondo	2024–2025
(Mexico) Francisco Suinaga Conde	2026 – Present

=== Coaching staff ===
Position	Staff
Manager	(Mexico) Edgar Dueñas
Assistant managers	(Mexico) Daniel Pérez (Mexico) Ellan Quintero
Fitness coaches	(Uruguay) Milton Silvera (Mexico) Valeria De Luna (Mexico) Daniel Sánchez
Therapist	(Mexico) Luz Vargas
Team doctor	(Mexico) Carlos Villasana
Doctor assistant	(Mexico) Angélica Arellano

Source: Liga MX Femenil

=== Managers chronological list ===
Name	From	To	Ref.
(Mexico) Juan Mendoza	2017	2019	
(Mexico) César Arzate (Interim)	2020	2020	
(Mexico) Agustín Contreras	2020	2020	
(Mexico) Alberto Cuate	2020	2021	
(Mexico) Gabriel Velasco	2022	2024	
(Brazil) Ricardo Belli	2024	2025	
(France) Patrice Lair	2025	2026	
(Spain) Alberto Toril	2026	2026	
(Mexico) Edgar Dueñas	2026		

=== Top managers appearances ===
Position	Manager	Period	Games
1	(Mexico) Juan Mendoza	2017–2019	84
2	(Mexico) Gabriel Velasco	2022–2024	85
3	(France) Patrice Lair	2025–2026	27
4	(Brazil) Ricardo Belli	2024–2025	24
5	(Mexico) Agustín Contreras	2019–2020	14

== Players ==
=== Current squad ===
As of September 4 2026

Note: Flags indicate national team as defined under FIFA eligibility rules; some limited exceptions apply. Players may hold more than one non-FIFA nationality.

No.	Pos.	Nation	Player
1	GK	MEX	Claudia Lozoya
2	DF	MEX	Karla Martínez
4	DF	MEX	Yaneisy Rodriguez
5	MF	MEX	Yamile Franco
6	MF	FRA	Amandine Henry
7	FW	MEX	Daniela Espinosa (on loan from América)
8	MF	USA	Kayla Fernandez
9	FW	FRA	Eugénie Le Sommer
10	MF	MEX	Casandra Cuevas
11	DF	MEX	Diana Guatemala
12	GK	MEX	Valeria Martínez
13	DF	MEX	Victoria López
14	MF	JAM	Deneisha Blackwood
15	MF	USA	Mitsy Ramirez

No.	Pos.	Nation	Player
16	DF	MEX	Liliana Fernandez
17	FW	SWE	Sofia Jakobsson
18	MF	MEX	Yareli García
22	MF	MEX	Sonia Vázquez
23	MF	MEX	Brenda Díaz
24	DF	DEN	Katrine Veje
25	MF	FRA	Faustine Robert
26	FW	MEX	Itzel Muñoz
27	DF	MEX	Blanca Muñoz
28	MF	MEX	Silvana González (on loan from San Luis)
29	FW	COL	Manuela Paví
31	GK	MEX	Stefani Jiménez
35	FW	MEX	Dulce Cuiriz

=== International players ===
Note: Players in bold are part of the latest squad in the corresponding category.

Selection	Category	Player(s)
Colombia	Absolute	**Manuela Paví**
Denmark	Absolute	**Katrine Veje**
France	Absolute	**Eugénie Le Sommer**
Jamaica	Absolute	**Deneisha Blackwood**
Sweden	Absolute	**Sofia Jakobsson**

=== Foreign players ===
Note: Players in bold are part of the latest squad in the corresponding category.

Name	Country	Position	Age	From	Years
Kayla Thompson	(United States)	Goalkeeper	25	(United States) Brown Bears S.C.	Cl. 2023-Cl. 2026
Abby Erceg	(New Zealand)	Defender	35	(United States) Racing Louisville F.C.	Cl. 2025-Cl. 2026
**Deneisha Blackwood**	(Jamaica)	Defender	28	(Mexico) C.F. Cruz Azul	Cl. 2026–
**Katrine Veje**	(Denmark)	Defender	35	(Italy) A.S. Roma	Ap. 2026–
Vanessa Penuna	(Cuba)	Midfielder	28	(Argentina) C.A. River Plate	Cl. 2023–Ap. 2023
**Amandine Henry**	(France)	Midfielder	34	(United States) Utah Royals S.C.	Ap. 2024–
Celia Bensalem	(France)	Midfielder	19	(France) Olympique Lyonnais	Ap. 2023–Cl. 2025
Shanice van de Sanden	(Netherlands)	Midfielder	32	(Mexico) C.F. Pachuca	Cl. 2025–Ap. 2025
**Faustine Robert**	(France)	Midfielder	31	(France) F.C. Fleury 91	Cl. 2025–
Destinney Duron	(United States)	Forward	24	(Mexico) C. América	Cl. 2020–Ap. 2023
Brenda Woch	(Brazil)	Forward	25	(Spain) Santa Teresa C.D.	Ap. 2022–Ap. 2024
Gloria Villamayor	(Paraguay)	Forward	32	(Spain) Secció Esportiva A.E.M.	Ap. 2022
Michaela Abam	(Cameroon)	Forward	26	(Sweden) Linköping F.C.	Cl. 2024–Ap. 2025
**Eugénie Le Sommer**	(France)	Forward	36	(France) Olympique Lyonnais	Cl. 2025–
**Manuela Paví**	(Colombia)	Forward	25	(England) West Ham F.C.	Cl. 2026–
**Sofia Jakobsson**	(Sweden)	Forward	35	(United States) London City Lionesses	Cl. 2026–

=== Most matches played of all time ===
Note: Players in bold are part of the current squad.

Position	Player	Period	Games
1	(Mexico) Mariel Roman	2018–2026	191
2	(Mexico) **Diana Guatemala**	2020–	154
3	(Mexico) Karen Becerril	2018–2023	137
4	(Mexico) Zaira Miranda	2018–2022	129
5	(Mexico) Laura Parra	2018–2023	126
6	(Mexico) Liliana Rodriguez	2017–2025	118
7	(Mexico) Yamanic Martínez	2019–2023	100
8	(Mexico) Noemí Granados	2019–2023	100
9	(Mexico) **Karla Martínez**	2020–2022; 2025–	100
10	(Mexico) María Mauleón	2017–2021	98

=== Top scorers of all time ===
Note: Players in bold are part of the current squad.

Position	Player	Period	Goals
1	(Mexico) Mariel Román	2018–2026	75
2	(France) **Eugénie Le Sommer**	2025–	40
3	(Mexico) María Mauleón	2017–2021	33
4	(Brazil) Brenda Woch	2022–2024	25
5	(Mexico) Carolina Miranda	2017–2022	25
6	(United States) Destinney Duron	2020–2023	23
7	(Mexico) Cinthya Peraza	2023–2026	20
8	(France) **Amandine Henry**	2024–	14
9	(Mexico) Karen Becerril	2018–2023	14
10	(Mexico) Kenya Téllez	2017–2020	12

=== League top scorers ===
Liga MX Femenil

Player	Season	Goals
(France) Eugénie Le Sommer	Clausura 2026	18

== Important squads ==
=== First squad in Copa de la Liga MX Femenil ===
Deportivo Toluca Femenil began the professional era of women's soccer in the Copa MX Femenil on Wednesday, May 3, 2017, facing Monarcas Morelia. They fell by a score of 2–1 at the Mexican Football Federation Stadium, with goals from Kenya Téllez (41') and Karla López (44').

First squad:
- (Mexico) 1 Mariel Godínez
- (Mexico) 4 Sahori Islas
- (Mexico) 2 Dirce Delgado
- (Mexico) 3 Daniela Gómez
- (Mexico) 5 Paloma Gutiérrez
- (Mexico) 7 Andrea Hernández
- (Mexico) 27 Liliana Rodríguez
- (Mexico) 18 Miroslava Chávez
- (Mexico) 8 María Enríquez
- (Mexico) 9 Kenya Téllez
- (Mexico) 11 Mayte Wuaustorf
- (Mexico) Manager: Juan Mendoza

=== First squad in Liga MX Femenil ===
The Diablas of Deportivo Toluca Femenil began their participation in the Apertura 2017 tournament of the Liga MX Femenil on Friday, July 28, 2017, at the Metepec facilities, winning by a score of 2–1 against Cruz Azul Fútbol Club Femenil. The scorers were Liliana Rodríguez (15') and Deborah Romero (86').

First squad:
- (Mexico) 12 Wendy Gallardo
- (Mexico) 2 Dirce Delgado
- (Mexico) 3 Daniela Gómez
- (Mexico) 4 Sahori Islas
- (Mexico) 23 Deborah Romero
- (Mexico) 7 Andrea Hernández
- (Mexico) 18 Miroslava Chávez
- (Mexico) 27 Liliana Rodríguez
- (Mexico) 9 Kenya Téllez
- (Mexico) 14 Natalia Mauleón
- (Mexico) 19 Karla López
- (Mexico) Manager: Juan Mendoza

=== First squad in the Liga MX Femenil playoffs ===
The Red Devils began their participation in the final phase of the Liga MX Femenil in the semifinals of the Clausura 2018 tournament on Sunday, April 15, 2018, at the Nemesio Diez Stadium, drawing 0–0 against Club de Fútbol Monterrey Femenil.

First squad:
- (Mexico) 1 Alondra Ubaldo
- (Mexico) 2 Dirce Delgado
- (Mexico) 3 Daniela Gómez
- (Mexico) 5 Anakaren Llamas
- (Mexico) 7 Andrea Hernández
- (Mexico) 26 Ivonne Meis
- (Mexico) 27 Liliana Rodríguez
- (Mexico) 29 Zaira Miranda
- (Mexico) 9 Kenya Téllez
- (Mexico) 11 Maritza Miranda
- (Mexico) 19 Karla López
- (Mexico) Manager: Juan Mendoza

== Statistics ==
=== Season-by-season statistics ===
Season	Manager	MP	W	D	L	GF	GA	GD	Pts	E	POS	Best result	Ref.
2017 Copa MX Femenil	(Mexico) Juan Mendoza	3	2	0	1	6	7	−1	6	66.7%	4.º	4th place
2017 Apertura	(Mexico) Juan Mendoza	16	4	2	10	15	30	−15	14	29.2%	6.º	Group stage
2018 Clausura	(Mexico) Juan Mendoza	14	4	2	8	16	27	−11	14	33.3%	5.º	Semifinals
2018 Apertura	(Mexico) Juan Mendoza	16	5	3	8	21	29	−8	18	37.5%	6.º	Group stage
2019 Clausura	(Mexico) Juan Mendoza	16	3	4	9	14	29	−15	13	27.1%	13.º	Group stage
2019 Apertura	(Mexico) Juan Mendoza	19	8	3	8	31	33	−2	27	47.4%	6.º	Quarter-finals
2020 Clausura	(Mexico) César Arzate (Interim) / (Mexico) Agustín Contreras	10	2	2	6	11	22	−11	8	26.7%	15.º	TOURNAMENT SUSPENDED (Note: The tournament was officially canceled by the Liga MX Femenil authorities due to the COVID-19 pandemic, leaving the tournament without a champion team.)
2020 Apertura	(Mexico) Agustín Contreras / (Mexico) Alberto Cuate	17	4	4	9	20	33	−13	16	31.4%	15.º	Group stage
2021 Clausura	(Mexico) Alberto Cuate	17	5	2	10	18	35	−17	17	33.3%	7.º	Group stage
2021 Apertura	(Mexico) Alberto Cuate	17	7	2	8	25	29	−4	23	45.1%	12.º	Group stage
2022 Clausura	(Mexico) Gabriel Velasco	17	5	5	7	20	27	−7	20	39.2%	10.º	Group stage
2022 Apertura	(Mexico) Gabriel Velasco	17	6	3	8	23	31	−8	21	41.2%	6.º	Group stage
2023 Clausura	(Mexico) Gabriel Velasco	17	6	4	7	27	30	−3	22	43.1%	10.º	Group stage
2023 Apertura	(Mexico) Gabriel Velasco	17	7	3	7	29	31	−2	24	47.1%	6.º	Group stage
2024 Clausura	(Mexico) Gabriel Velasco	17	8	2	7	30	28	2	26	51.0%	9.º	Quarter-finals
2024 Apertura	(Brazil) Ricardo Belli	17	5	4	8	24	32	−8	19	37.3%	8.º	Group stage
2025 Clausura	(Brazil) Ricardo Belli	17	6	3	8	26	34	−8	21	41.2%	11.º	Group stage
2025 Apertura	(France) Patrice Lair	17	10	5	2	35	17	18	35	68.6%	4.º	Quarter-finals
2026 Clausura	(France) Patrice Lair	17	10	3	4	38	26	12	33	64.7%	6.º	Semifinals
2026 Apertura	(Spain) Alberto Toril / (Mexico) Edgar Dueñas (Interim)	14	8	3	3	30	21	+9	27	64.3%	4.º	Resigned after matchday 9 / Quarter-finals
TOTAL		307	113	57	137	448	542	−94	396	43.0%	8.º	2 SEMIFINALS

== Youth Academy ==
=== Honours ===
The club operates youth teams in the Under-18 and Under-19 categories of the Liga MX Femenil development system.

In the Clausura 2023 season, the Under-18 squad won its first league title after defeating América in the final series.

Following the reorganisation of the league's youth divisions into an Under-19 format, Toluca Femenil won the Apertura 2024 championship by defeating Atlético San Luis in the final. The team returned to the final in the subsequent Clausura 2025 tournament, finishing as runners-up.

Type	Competition	Titles	Winning Seasons	Runners Up
Reserves and academy	Liga MX Femenil U18	1	Clausura 2023	
Reserves and academy	Liga MX Femenil U19	1	Apertura 2024	Clausura 2025

=== Women's Academy Manager ===
- (Mexico) Ana Lilia Gómez Vences – Women's U-19 Manager

== See also ==
- Toluca FC
- Nemesio Diez Stadium
