= Ashlyn Fernandez =

Mexican footballer (born 2004)

Personal information
- Full name: Ashlyn Marie Fernandez Harvey
- Date of birth: 10 May 2004 (age 22)
- Place of birth: Oklahoma, United States
- Height: 1.68 m (5 ft 6 in)
- Position: Defender

Team information
- Current team: Monterrey
- Number: 21

College career
Years	Team	Apps	(Gls)
2021–2024	University of Tulsa	74	(8)

Senior career*
Years	Team	Apps	(Gls)
2025–	Monterrey	8	(0)

International career
2023	Mexico U20		
- * Club domestic league appearances and goals as of 9 February 2026

Ashlyn Marie Fernandez Harvey (born 10 May 2004) is a professional footballer who plays as a Defender for Liga MX Femenil side Monterrey. Born and raised in the United States, she represents Mexico internationally.

== Career ==
Fernandez started her career in 2025 with Monterrey.

== International career ==
Since 2023, Fernandez has been part of the Mexico U-20 team.

== Personal life ==
Fernandez' sisters Liliana and Kayla are also footballers.
