= Blanca Muñoz =

Mexican footballer (born 2005)

Personal information
- Full name: Blanca Araceli Muñoz Hernández
- Date of birth: 9 July 2005 (age 21)
- Place of birth: León, Guanajuato, Mexico
- Height: 1.74 m (5 ft 9 in)
- Position: Centre-back

Team information
- Current team: Toluca
- Number: 27

Senior career*
Years	Team	Apps	(Gls)
2020–2023	León	31	(0)
2024	UANL	6	(0)
2025–	Toluca	3	(0)

International career^{‡}
2023–	Mexico U-20		
- * Club domestic league appearances and goals as of 31 January 2026 ‡ National team caps and goals as of 12 March 2022

Blanca Araceli Muñoz Hernández (born 9 July 2005) is a Mexican professional footballer who plays as a Centre-back for Liga MX Femenil side Toluca.

== Career ==
In 2020, she started her career in León. In 2023, she joined to UANL. Since 2025, she is part of Toluca.

== International career ==
Since 2023, Muñoz has been part of the Mexico U-20 team.
