= Dirce Delgado =

Mexican footballer (born 1986)

Personal information
- Full name: Dirce Delgado García
- Date of birth: 29 August 1986 (age 40)
- Place of birth: Toluca, State of Mexico, Mexico
- Height: 1.60 m (5 ft 3 in)
- Position: Centre-back

Senior career*
Years	Team	Apps	(Gls)
2017–2019	Toluca	54	(1)
2019–2024	UNAM	136	(6)
2025–2026	Atlas	37	(1)
- * Club domestic league appearances and goals as of 6 February 2026

Dirce Delgado García (born 29 August 1986) is a Mexican professional footballer who played as a defender for Liga MX Femenil side UNAM.

== Career ==
In 2017, she started her career in Toluca. In 2019, she was transferred to UNAM.
