= Liliana Fernandez (soccer) =

Mexican footballer (born 2001)

Personal information
- Full name: Liliana Taylor Fernandez Harvey
- Date of birth: 10 April 2001 (age 25)
- Place of birth: Oklahoma, United States
- Height: 1.67 m (5 ft 6 in)
- Position: Defender

Team information
- Current team: Toluca
- Number: 16

College career
Years	Team	Apps	(Gls)
2019–2023	University of Tulsa	79	(8)

Senior career*
Years	Team	Apps	(Gls)
2024–	Toluca	42	(1)

International career
2026–	Mexico U23		
- * Club domestic league appearances and goals as of 9 February 2026

Liliana Taylor Fernandez Harvey (born 10 April 2001) is a professional footballer who plays as a Defender for Liga MX Femenil side Toluca. Born and raised in the United States, she represents Mexico internationally.

== Career ==
Fernandez started her career in 2024 with Toluca.

== International career ==
Since 2026, Fernandez has been part of the Mexico U-23 team.

== Personal life ==
Fernandez' sisters Ashlyn and Kayla are also footballers.
