= Brenda Díaz =

Mexican footballer (born 2001)

Personal information
- Full name: Brenda Esmeralda Díaz Ojeda
- Date of birth: 22 May 2001 (age 25)
- Place of birth: León, Guanajuato, Mexico
- Height: 1.60 m (5 ft 3 in)
- Position: Centre-back

Team information
- Current team: Toluca
- Number: 23

Senior career*
Years	Team	Apps	(Gls)
2017–2025	León	197	(5)
2026–	Toluca	3	(1)
- * Club domestic league appearances and goals as of 31 January 2026 ‡ National team caps and goals as of 12 March 2022

Brenda Esmeralda Díaz Ojeda (Note: In this Spanish name, the first or paternal surname is Díaz and the second or maternal family name is Ojeda.) (born 22 May 2001) is a Mexican professional footballer who plays as a Right-back for Liga MX Femenil side Toluca.

== Career ==
In 2017, she started her career in León. She is the current captain and the player with most caps in the history of the team.
