= Yamile Franco =

Mexican footballer (born 1992)

Personal information
- Full name: Yamile Azenek Franco Tirado
- Date of birth: 7 July 1992 (age 34)
- Place of birth: Mexico City, Mexico
- Height: 1.64 m (5 ft 5 in)
- Position: Defensive midfielder

Team information
- Current team: Toluca
- Number: 5

Senior career*
Years	Team	Apps	(Gls)
2017–2018	Pachuca	15	(10)
2018	Toluca	9	(2)
2019–2020	León	40	(10)
2020–2024	Monterrey	47	(5)
2024–2026	Guadalajara	50	(2)
2026–	Toluca	0	(0)

International career
2011–2012	Mexico U-20		
2012–	Mexico	13	(1)
- * Club domestic league appearances and goals as of 31 January 2026

Yamile Azenek Franco Tirado (born 7 July 1992) is a Mexican professional football midfielder who currently plays for Toluca of the Liga MX Femenil.

Franco played for the Mexico national team in a 2017 friendly against Sweden.
