= Diana Guatemala =

Mexican footballer (born 2002)

Personal information
- Full name: Diana Michelle Guatemala García
- Date of birth: 14 March 2002 (age 24)
- Place of birth: Acapulco, Guerrero, Mexico
- Height: 1.57 m (5 ft 2 in)
- Position: Winger

Team information
- Current team: Toluca
- Number: 11

Senior career*
Years	Team	Apps	(Gls)
2018–2020	Morelia	49	(1)
2020–	Toluca	134	(8)
Medal record
Women's football
Representing Mexico
Central American and Caribbean Games
Gold medal – first place	2026 Santo Domingo	Team
- * Club domestic league appearances and goals as of 4 June 2023 ‡ National team caps and goals as of 12 March 2022

Diana Michelle Guatemala García (born 14 March 2002) is a Mexican professional footballer who plays as a winger for Liga MX Femenil side Toluca.

== Career ==
In 2018, she started her career in Morelia. In 2020, she was transferred to Toluca.

== Honours ==
Mexico U23

- Central American and Caribbean Gold Medal: 2026
