= Faustine Robert =

French footballer (born 1994)

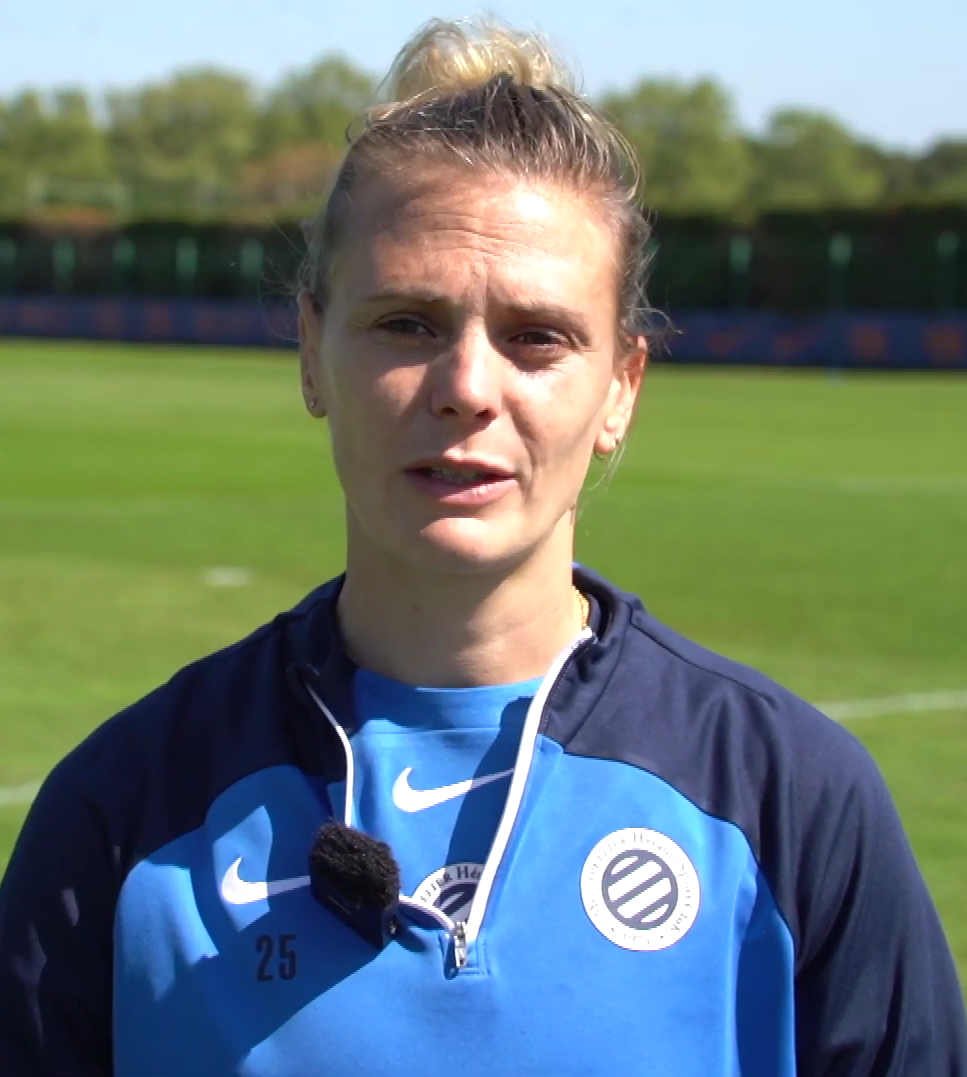
- Robert in 2023

Personal information
- Full name: Faustine Robert
- Date of birth: 18 May 1994 (age 32)
- Place of birth: Sète, France
- Height: 1.65 m (5 ft 5 in)
- Positions: Winger; midfielder

Team information
- Current team: Toluca
- Number: 25

Youth career
- 2000–2003: Stade Balarucois
- 2003–2004: Sète
- 2004–2005: Montpellier
- 2005–2006: Sète
- 2006–2013: Montpellier

Senior career*
| Years | Team | Apps | (Gls) |
| 2009–2010 | Montpellier B | 5 | (2) |
| 2010–2013 | Montpellier | 14 | (3) |
| 2013–2021 | Guingamp | 144 | (28) |
| 2021–2024 | Montpellier | 64 | (24) |
| 2024–2025 | Fleury | 21 | (5) |
| 2025– | Toluca | 27 | (7) |

International career
| 2012–2013 | France U19 | 14 | (3) |
| 2014 | France U20 | 7 | (4) |
| 2017–2018 | France | 2 | (0) |
Medal record
Women's football
Representing France
FIFA U-20 Women's World Cup
| Third place | 2014 Canada |
UEFA Women's Under-19 Championship
| Winner | 2013 Wales |
- * Club domestic league appearances and goals as of 31 January 2026

Faustine Robert (born 18 May 1994) is a French professional footballer who plays as a winger or midfielder for Liga MX Femenil club Toluca.

== Club career ==
On 1 July 2024, Robert joined Première Ligue club Fleury on a two-year contract until June 2026.

== International career ==
Robert made her France senior team debut on 27 November 2017 in a goalless draw against Sweden.

== Career statistics ==
=== International ===
As of match played 1 March 2018

Appearances and goals by national team and year
| National team | Year | Apps | Goals |
|---|---|---|---|
| France | 2017 | 1 | 0 |
| France | 2018 | 1 | 0 |
| Total | | 2 | 0 |

== Honours ==
Individual

- Coupe de France Féminine top goalscorer: 2018–19
