= Destinney Duron =

Mexican footballer (born 1996)

Personal information
- Full name: Destinney Rosalía Duron Alonzo
- Date of birth: February 15, 1996 (age 30)
- Place of birth: Santa Clarita, California, United States
- Height: 1.66 m (5 ft 5 in)
- Position: Forward

College career
Years	Team	Apps	(Gls)
2014–2018	Cal State Northridge Matadors	57	(1)

Senior career*
Years	Team	Apps	(Gls)
2020	América	6	(2)
2020–2023	Toluca	88	(23)
2024–2025	Juárez	16	(1)
2026	León	0	(0)
- * Club domestic league appearances and goals as of June 4, 2023

Destinney Rosalía Duron Alonzo (born February 15, 1996) is a professional footballer who plays as a forward. Born and raised in the United States, she represents Mexico internationally.

== Career ==
In 2020, she started her career in América. In 2020, she joined to Toluca. Sinche 2024, she is part of Juárez.
