= Yaneisy Rodriguez =

Mexican footballer (born 2002)

Personal information
- Full name: Yaneisy Rodriguez Perez
- Date of birth: 8 March 2002 (age 24)
- Place of birth: Richland, Washington, United States
- Height: 1.66 m (5 ft 5 in)
- Position: Full-back

Team information
- Current team: Toluca
- Number: 4

College career
Years	Team	Apps	(Gls)
2020–2021	Washington Huskies	3	(0)

Senior career*
Years	Team	Apps	(Gls)
2022	Necaxa	12	(0)
2022–2024	UNAM	65	(0)
2025	Cruz Azul	37	(1)
2026–	Toluca	5	(0)
- * Club domestic league appearances and goals as of 31 January 2026

Yaneisy Rodriguez Perez (born 8 March 2002), is a professional footballer who plays as a full-back for Liga MX Femenil club Toluca. Born to Mexican parents in the United States, she embraces her Mexican American identity with Indigenous roots.

== Early life and education ==
Rodriguez was born on 8 March 2002, in Richland, Washington, to Carmen and Manuel Rodriguez. She has two older siblings: Yaritza and Iovani. Her father played soccer for Chapingo Autonomous University, and her brother played for Saint Martin's University.

Rodriguez started playing soccer at age six in a recreational program at the YMCA shortly after she started playing club soccer at Three Rivers Soccer Club in Pasco WA. In middle school, she moved to Vancouver, Washington, and joined FC Portland in the Elite Clubs National League (ECNL). In 2019, she was selected to be part of the ECNL Conference Selection Program in the Northwest Conference.

Rodriguez attended Columbia River High School, where she lettered all four years. She helped the team win the state championship her freshman and senior years. She was named a First Team All-Conference player for three years. In 2019, Yaneisy scored 25 goals and 16 assists in her senior season, including three game-winning goals in the state tournament. She was also named The Columbian's All-Region girls soccer player of the year.

After graduating from Columbia River High School in 2020, Rodriguez began studying at the University of Washington.

In December 2021, she participated in a U-20 Mexican women's national team training camp.

As of 2024, she is working toward a bachelor's degree in communications.

== College career ==
While attending the University of Washington, Rodriguez had a short spell with the school's soccer team, making her NCAA debut in the spring of 2021.

== Club career ==
=== Necaxa (2022) ===
On January 19, 2022, Rodriguez was announced as the newest player for Necaxa Femenil in the LIGA MX Femenil Clausura 2022. After the Clausura 2022 ended, Rodriguez left the team.

=== UNAM (2022–present) ===
Rodriguez joined Club Universidad Nacional for the LIGA MX Femenil Apertura 2022. The team reached the league finals in Clausura 2023.
