= Karla Martínez (footballer) =

Mexican footballer (born 1998)

Personal information
- Full name: Karla Lorena Martínez Díaz
- Date of birth: 14 October 1998 (age 28)
- Place of birth: Azcapotzalco, Mexico City, Mexico
- Height: 1.73 m (5 ft 8 in)
- Position: Centre-back

Team information
- Current team: Toluca
- Number: 2

Senior career*
Years	Team	Apps	(Gls)
2017–2019	Santos Laguna	55	(1)
2020–2022	Toluca	77	(4)
2023–2025	Guadalajara	52	(1)
2025–	Toluca	20	(1)

International career^{‡}
2023–	Mexico	3	(0)
- * Club domestic league appearances and goals as of 31 January 2026 ‡ National team caps and goals as of 19 February 2025

Karla Lorena Martínez Díaz (born 14 October 1998) is a Mexican professional footballer who plays as a defender for Liga MX Femenil side Toluca and the Mexico women's national team.

== Career ==
In 2017, she started her career in Santos Laguna. In 2020, she was transferred to Toluca. Since 2023, she is a player of Guadalajara. Due to her good performances, she was called up to the Mexico national team.

== International career ==
Martínez made her debut for the Mexico women's national team on 5 December 2023 in a 2024 CONCACAF W Gold Cup qualification game against Trinidad and Tobago.
