= Liliana Rodríguez (footballer) =

Mexican footballer (born 1996)

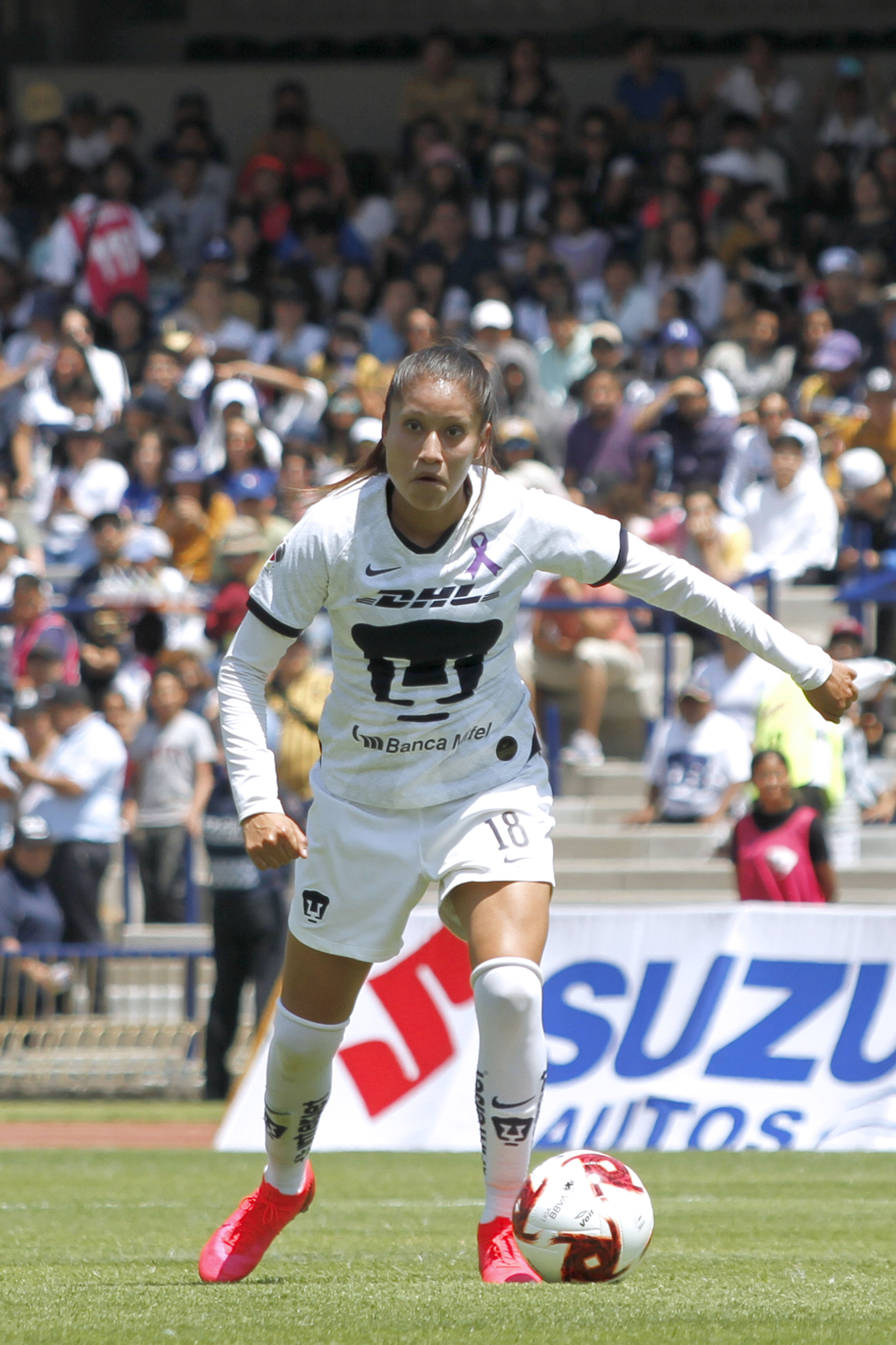
- Rodríguez playing for UNAM in 2020

Personal information
- Full name: Liliana Rodríguez Alejo
- Date of birth: 27 February 1996 (age 30)
- Place of birth: Toluca, State of Mexico, Mexico
- Height: 1.69 m (5 ft 7 in)
- Position: Attacking midfielder

Team information
- Current team: Cruz Azul
- Number: 6

Senior career*
Years	Team	Apps	(Gls)
2017–2018	Toluca	44	(7)
2019	UANL	6	(3)
2019–2022	UNAM	67	(8)
2022–2025	Toluca	74	(5)
2025–	Cruz Azul	7	(0)

International career
2014–2015	Mexico U-17		
2015–2016	Mexico U-20		
- * Club domestic league appearances and goals as of 1 February 2026

Liliana Rodríguez Alejo (born 27 February 1996) is a Mexican professional footballer who plays as a midfielder for Liga Femenil club Cruz Azul.

== Personal life ==
Rodríguez is openly lesbian. She is currently engaged to Atlético San Luis defender Maite García, who was her teammate at Toluca.
