= Gabriel Velasco (footballer) =

Mexican footballer (born 1986)

Personal information
- Full name: Gabriel Velasco Gutiérrez
- Date of birth: 1 February 1986 (age 40)
- Place of birth: Cuernavaca, Morelos, Mexico
- Height: 1.73 m (5 ft 8 in)
- Position: Midfielder

Senior career*
Years	Team	Apps	(Gls)
2007–2009	Académicos	29	(3)
2009–2011	Cruz Azul Hidalgo	28	(5)
2011–2016	Toluca	20	(1)
2016	→ Coras (loan)	11	(2)
2016–2017	UAEM	12	(1)

Managerial career
- 2019: C.D. Leones
- 2020–2021: Ángeles Morelos
- 2022–2024: Toluca (women)
- * Club domestic league appearances and goals

Gabriel Velasco Gutiérrez (born 1 February 1986) is a Mexican football manager and former player who managed Toluca (women). A midfielder, he last played for Potros UAEM.
