= Pirma =

Mexican sports equipment company (1990)

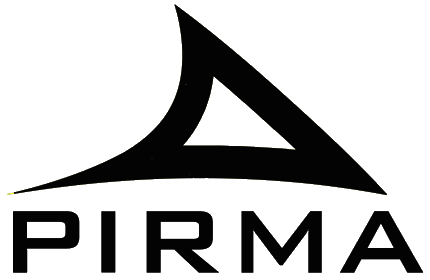
- Company type: Private
- Industry: Sports equipment
- Founded: 1990; 36 years ago
- Founder: Rafael León Meléndez
- Headquarters: Purisima del Rincón, Guanajuato, Mexico
- Area served: Americas
- Products: Athletic shoes, sportswear, apparel, goalkeeper gloves, footballs
- Number of employees: 3,000
- Website: pirma.com.mx

Pirma is a Mexican sports equipment manufacturing company. It began in 1990 in Mexico and expanded in the Americas. The company commercialises men's and women's urban clothing and apparel (including jackets, t-shirts, and shorts), sports uniforms, athletic shoes, goalkeeper gloves, and footballs.

Company's products include a variety of sports such as football, basketball, boxing, running, and tennis. It also sells accessories such as bags, caps, and goalkeeper gloves.

Pirma has about 200 stores in Mexico, supplied by its two plants in León and San Francisco del Rincón both in the state of Guanajuato, with nearly 3,000 employees. Apart from Mexico, the firm operates in Brazil, Canada, Costa Rica, El Salvador, Panama, and the United States, exporting 10% of its products to those countries.

== History ==
The origins of the company can be traced back to 1987 when entrepreneur Rafael León started to produce shoe soles in San Francisco del Rincón (Guanajuato) through its own company, "Caribbean". Three years later it entered into production of athletic footwear. The company was known as "Pirma-Brasil" until 1999 when the word Brasil was suppressed due to registration of brands including countries names was not allowed.

By 2013, Pirma concentrated 8% of sporting goods production in Mexico, positioning it as the 6th company in this sector.

In 2018, Pirma signed a deal with Mexican multimedia company Grupo Televisa to provide clothing for all its staff during the 2018 FIFA World Cup held in Russia. The company supplied about 200 workers (including cameramen, photographers and hosts) of the "Televisa Deportes" division that travelled to Russia to cover the competition.
