= Daniela Calderón =

Mexican footballer (born 1997)

Personal information
- Full name: Daniela Calderón García
- Date of birth: 14 July 1997 (age 29)
- Place of birth: San Juan del Río, Querétaro, Mexico
- Height: 1.73 m (5 ft 8 in)
- Position: Forward

Team information
- Current team: Cruz Azul
- Number: 13

Senior career*
Years	Team	Apps	(Gls)
2019–2024	León	168	(47)
2025	Guadalajara	8	(0)
2025–	Cruz Azul	22	(6)
- * Club domestic league appearances and goals as of 1 February 2026 ‡ National team caps and goals as of 12 March 2022

Daniela Calderón García (born 14 July 1997) is a Mexican professional footballer who plays as a forward for Liga Femenil club Cruz Azul.

== Career ==
In 2019, she started her career in León and is the club's all-time top goalscorer.
