= Aerial Chavarin =

American soccer player (born 1998)

Personal information
- Full name: Aerial LynnDonna Chavarin
- Date of birth: March 18, 1998 (age 28)
- Place of birth: Oakland, California
- Height: 5 ft 10 in (1.78 m)
- Position: Attacking midfielder

Team information
- Current team: Monterrey
- Number: 25

College career
Years	Team	Apps	(Gls)
2016–2019	Yale Bulldogs	63	(25)

Senior career*
Years	Team	Apps	(Gls)
2020	Chicago Red Stars	0	(0)
2021	Keflavík ÍF	16	(7)
2022–2024	UNAM	81	(33)
2025–2026	Cruz Azul	46	(39)
2026–	Monterrey	0	(0)
- * Club domestic league appearances and goals

Aerial LynnDonna Chavarin (born March 18, 1998) is an American professional soccer player who plays for Liga Femenil club Monterrey.

== Club career ==
=== Chicago Red Stars ===
Chavarin made her NWSL debut on September 12, 2020.
