= 2017–18 Club América (women) season =

América
2017–18 season
- Chairman: Santiago Baños
- Manager: Leonardo Cuéllar
- Stadium: Estadio Azteca
- Apertura: Semifinals (1st)
- Clausura: Semifinals (2nd)
- Top goalscorer: Lucero Cuevas (31 goals)
- Biggest win: Morelia 1–12 América (2 April 2018)
- Biggest defeat: UANL 3–0 América (16 April 2018)
Home colours	Away colours

The 2017–18 season was América's first competitive season and first season in the Liga MX Femenil, the top flight of Mexican women's football.

América managed to qualify to the playoffs on the Apertura 2017 and Clausura 2018 tournaments, but was eliminated in semifinals both times: in the Apertura tournament by rivals Guadalajara and in the Clausura tournament by UANL.

The team was managed by Leonardo Cuéllar, who previously coached Mexico women's national football team from 1998 to 2016.

== Squad ==
=== Apertura ===
No.	Nat.	Name	Date of birth (age)	Since
Goalkeepers
1	(Mexico)	Cecilia Santiago (Captain)	19 October 1994 (aged 22)	2017
23	(Mexico)	Maricruz González	29 June 1996 (aged 21)	2017
24	(Mexico)	Jaidy Gutiérrez	24 October 2001 (aged 15)	2017
Defenders
2	(Mexico)	Daniela Alcantar	21 December 1995 (aged 21)	2017
3	(Mexico)	Marylin Díaz	18 November 1991 (aged 25)	2017
4	(Mexico)	Ana Lozada	22 July 1997 (aged 20)	2017
5	(Mexico)	Ximena Ríos	26 July 2001 (aged 16)	2017
14	(Mexico)	Mónica Rodríguez	3 August 1998 (aged 18)	2017
15	(Mexico)	Julieta Peralta	15 April 2002 (aged 15)	2017
19	(Mexico)	Zulma Hernández	9 September 1995 (aged 21)	2017
21	(Mexico)	Anakaren Llamas	11 March 1993 (aged 24)	2017
Midfielders
6	(Mexico)	Diana Fierro	19 June 1995 (aged 22)	2017
7	(Mexico)	Dayana Cázares	30 December 1999 (aged 17)	2017
8	(Mexico)	Alexia Delgado	9 December 1999 (aged 17)	2017
11	(Mexico)	Montserrat Hernández	26 June 1999 (aged 18)	2017
12	(Mexico)	Melissa Arredondo	6 April 1999 (aged 18)	2017
16	(Mexico)	Alexandra Martínez	5 February 2000 (aged 17)	2017
17	(Mexico)	Edna Santamaría	2 June 1992 (aged 25)	2017
20	(Mexico)	Paola Espino	18 August 1995 (aged 21)	2017
22	(Mexico)	Naylea Martínez	6 August 2001 (aged 15)	2017
Forwards
9	(Mexico)	Lucero Cuevas	22 January 1996 (aged 21)	2017
10	(Mexico)	Daniela Espinosa	13 July 1999 (aged 18)	2017
18	(Mexico)	Casandra Cuevas	21 April 1997 (aged 20)	2017

=== Clausura ===
No.	Nat.	Name	Date of birth (age)	Since
Goalkeepers
1	(Mexico)	Cecilia Santiago (Captain)	19 October 1994 (aged 23)	2017
23	(Mexico)	Maricruz González	29 June 1996 (aged 21)	2017
24	(Mexico)	Jaidy Gutiérrez	24 October 2001 (aged 16)	2017
Defenders
2	(Mexico)	Daniela Alcantar	21 December 1995 (aged 22)	2017
3	(Mexico)	Marylin Díaz	18 November 1991 (aged 26)	2017
4	(Mexico)	Ana Lozada (Vice-captain)	22 July 1997 (aged 20)	2017
5	(Mexico)	Ximena Ríos	26 July 2001 (aged 16)	2017
12	(Mexico)	Estefanía Fuentes	2 August 1994 (aged 23)	2018
14	(Mexico)	Mónica Rodríguez	3 August 1998 (aged 19)	2017
15	(Mexico)	Julieta Peralta	15 April 2002 (aged 15)	2017
19	(Mexico)	Zulma Hernández	9 September 1995 (aged 22)	2017
25	(Mexico)	Jana Gutiérrez	25 October 2003 (aged 14)	2018
26	(Mexico)	Alma Verania López	16 March 1999 (aged 18)	2018
27	(Mexico)	Laura Parra	19 December 2000 (aged 17)	2018
Midfielders
6	(Mexico)	Diana Fierro	19 June 1995 (aged 22)	2017
7	(Mexico)	Dayana Cázares	30 December 1999 (aged 18)	2017
8	(Mexico)	Alexia Delgado	9 December 1999 (aged 18)	2017
11	(Mexico)	Montserrat Hernández	26 June 1999 (aged 18)	2017
17	(Mexico)	Edna Santamaría	2 June 1992 (aged 25)	2017
21	(Mexico)	Esmeralda Verdugo	19 January 1994 (aged 23)	2018
Forwards
9	(Mexico)	Lucero Cuevas	22 January 1996 (aged 21)	2017
10	(Mexico)	Daniela Espinosa	13 July 1999 (aged 18)	2017
18	(Mexico)	Casandra Cuevas	21 April 1997 (aged 20)	2017
22	(Mexico)	Alexia Villanueva	22 February 2003 (aged 14)	2018

== Transfers ==
=== In ===
Pos.	Player	Moving from	Transfer window	Ref.
DF	(Mexico) Alma Verania López	Querétaro	Winter	

=== Out ===
Pos.	Player	Moving to	Transfer window	Ref.
MF	(Mexico) Naylea Martínez	Necaxa	Winter	
DF	(Mexico) Anakaren Llamas	Toluca	Winter	
MF	(Mexico) Melissa Arredondo	Querétaro	Winter	
MF	(Mexico) Alexandra Martínez	UNAM	Winter	

== Coaching staff ==
Position	Staff
Manager	(Mexico) Leonardo Cuéllar
Assistant manager	(Mexico) Ana Laura Galindo
Doctor	(Mexico) María Durán
Medical assistant	(Mexico) José Bello
Medical assistant	(Mexico) María González
Kit manager	(Mexico) Fernando Mejía

== Competitions ==
=== Overview ===
Competition	First match	Last match	Starting round	Final position	Record							
Competition	First match	Last match	Starting round	Final position	Pld	W	D	L	GF	GA	GD	Win %
Apertura	29 July 2017	11 November 2017	Matchday 1	Semifinals (1st)	16	11	3	2	52	17	+35	68.75
Clausura	6 January 2018	22 April 2018	Matchday 1	Semifinals (2nd)	16	11	3	2	49	15	+34	68.75
Total					32	22	6	4	101	32	+69	68.75

Source: Competitions

=== Torneo Apertura ===
==== League table ====
Pos	Team	Pld	W	D	L	GF	GA	GD	Pts	Qualification or relegation
1	América	14	11	2	1	48	11	+37	35	Advance to Liguilla (Note: The two best teams of each group advance to the semifinals of the Liguilla.)
2	UANL	14	11	1	2	51	7	+44	34	Advance to Liguilla
3	Guadalajara (C)	14	11	1	2	33	10	+23	34	Advance to Liguilla
4	Monterrey	14	10	1	3	38	17	+21	31	
5	Pachuca	14	9	3	2	36	16	+20	30	Advance to Liguilla

Source: Liga MX Femenil
Rules for classification: 1) Points; 2) Goal difference; 3) Number of goals scored; 4) Number of away goals scored; 5) Head-to-head results between tied teams; 6) Drawing of lots
(C) Champions

==== Matches ====
29 July 2017 1	América	1–0	Tijuana	Coyoacán, Mexico City
17:00	L. Cuevas 19'	Report		Stadium: Club América; Referee: Blanca de Lira

4 August 2017 2	Cruz Azul	0–5	América	Benito Juárez, Mexico City
16:00		Report	Cázares 3'; L. Cuevas 19', 43', 73'; C. Cuevas 79'	Stadium: Estadio Azul; Referee: Michel Caballero

11 August 2017 3	Toluca	1–2	América	Toluca, State of Mexico
12:00	Mauleón 62'	Report	C. Cuevas 12'; L. Cuevas 21'	Stadium: Estadio Nemesio Díez; Referee: Alfredo Medina

19 August 2017 4	América	5–0	Morelia	Tlalpan, Mexico City
16:00	Cázares 26', 86'; Ríos 63'; L. Cuevas 66', 71'	Report		Stadium: Estadio Azteca; Referee: Víctor Rodríguez

28 August 2017 5	Pachuca	1–1	América	Pachuca, Hidalgo
12:00	Franco 73'	Report	L. Cuevas 1'	Stadium: Estadio Hidalgo; Referee: Jonathan Vázquez

2 September 2017 6	América	1–0	UNAM	Tlalpan, Mexico City
16:00	L. Cuevas 90'	Report		Stadium: Estadio Azteca; Referee: Lucila Venegas

9 September 2017 7	Veracruz	1–8	América	Boca del Río, Veracruz
10:10	Ruiz 59' (pen.)	Report	Hernández 3'; Espinosa 30', 51', 74'; Cázares 36', 42'; Díaz 64' (pen.); C. Cuevas 69'	Stadium: Estadio Luis "Pirata" Fuente; Referee: Guillermo Álvarez

15 September 2017 8	Tijuana	2–2	América	Tijuana, Baja California
21:15	Gutiérrez 36' (pen.); Juárez 67'	Report	L. Cuevas 15', 72'	Stadium: Estadio Caliente; Referee: Ricardo Fierro

30 September 2017 10	América	3–0	Toluca	Coyoacán, Mexico City
16:00	Cázares 9'; L. Cuevas 16'; Espinosa 57'	Report		Stadium: Club América; Referee: Iván Rodríguez

7 October 2017 11	Morelia	1–7	América	Morelia, Michoacán
12:30	Molina 75'	Report	Arellano 7' (o.g.); Cázares 18'; Espinosa 24' (pen.), 36'; L. Cuevas 42', 83'	Stadium: Estadio Morelos; Referee: Carlos Alberto Pérez

15 October 2017 12	América	3–4	Pachuca	Tlalpan, Mexico City
16:00	Espinosa 1'; Fierro 40'; Cázares 90+2'	Report	García 37'; Salazar 56', 65'; Muñoz 79'	Stadium: Estadio Azteca; Referee: Alan López

18 October 2017 9	América	6–0	Cruz Azul	Coyoacán, Mexico City
16:00	Espinosa 16'; L. Cuevas 17'; Hernández 20', 22'; Zavaleta 65' (o.g.); Santamaría 78'	Report		Stadium: Club América; Referee: Eduardo González

21 October 2017 13	UNAM	0–1	América	Coyoacán, Mexico City
16:00		Report	Hernández 68'	Stadium: La Cantera; Referee: Brandon Campillo

28 October 2017 14	América	3–1	Veracruz	Coyoacán, Mexico City
16:00	C. Cuevas 43'; Cázares 66', 76'	Report	Hernández 40' (pen.)	Stadium: Club América; Referee: Alan Pérez

==== Playoffs ====
===== Semifinals =====
4 November 2017 First leg	Guadalajara	4–2	América	Zapopan, Jalisco
16:30	Morales 36', 80'; Tovar 68'; Carrandi 90+2'	Report	Cuevas 28'; Espinosa 31'	Stadium: Estadio Chivas; Referee: Lucila Venegas

11 November 2017 Second leg	América	2–2 (4–6 agg.)	Guadalajara	Tlalpan, Mexico City
16:00	Cázares 57'; C. Cuevas 86'	Report	Viramontes 8'; Palafox 52'	Stadium: Estadio Azteca; Referee: Quetzalli Alvarado

=== Torneo Clausura ===
==== League table ====
Pos	Team	Pld	W	D	L	GF	GA	GD	Pts	Qualification or relegation
1	Monterrey	14	11	1	2	45	13	+32	34	Advance to Liguilla (Note: The two best teams of each group advance to the semifinals of the Liguilla.)
2	América	14	10	3	1	47	11	+36	33	Advance to Liguilla
3	UANL (C)	14	10	1	3	38	16	+22	31	Advance to Liguilla
4	Guadalajara	14	9	2	3	30	13	+17	29	
5	Toluca	14	9	2	3	22	13	+9	29	Advance to Liguilla

Source: Liga MX Femenil
Rules for classification: 1) Points; 2) Goal difference; 3) Number of goals scored; 4) Number of away goals scored; 5) Head-to-head results between tied teams; 6) Drawing of lots
(C) Champions

==== Matches ====
6 January 2018 1	América	1–2	Toluca	Tlalpan, Mexico City
16:00	C. Cuevas 90+1'	Report	C. Miranda 50'; Mauleón 70'	Stadium: Estadio Azteca; Referee: Blanca de Lira

15 January 2018 2	Pachuca	2–3	América	Pachuca, Hidalgo
19:00	Díaz 7'; Nieto 66'	Report	Verdugo 12'; L. Cuevas 47', 50'	Stadium: Estadio Hidalgo; Referee: Arturo Alcántara

20 January 2018 3	América	4–0	Veracruz	Tlalpan, Mexico City
16:00	L. Cuevas 10', 43'; Díaz 31' (pen.); Fuentes 63'	Report		Stadium: Estadio Azteca; Referee: Iván Rodríguez

28 January 2018 4	América	7–1	Cruz Azul	Tlalpan, Mexico City
18:00	L. Cuevas 3', 67'; Lozada 35'; C. Cuevas 53', 74'; Fierro 75'; Santamaría 80'	Report	Barba 31'	Stadium: Estadio Azteca; Referee: Mario Terrazas

5 February 2018 5	Tijuana	0–1	América	Tijuana, Baja California
19:00		Report	L. Cuevas 16' (pen.)	Stadium: Estadio Caliente; Referee: Ricardo Fierro

12 February 2018 6	América	6–1	Morelia	Tlalpan, Mexico City
20:00	L. Cuevas 25'; C. Cuevas 53'; Díaz 63'; Espinosa 72', 75'; Cázares 83'	Report	Molina 64'	Stadium: Estadio Azteca; Referee: Luis Gerardo García

17 February 2018 7	UNAM	1–1	América	Coyoacán, Mexico City
19:00	López 68'	Report	C. Cuevas 20'	Stadium: La Cantera; Referee: Jesús Roberto Ruiz

26 February 2018 8	Toluca	1–1	América	Toluca, State of Mexico
18:00	K. Téllez 88'	Report	C. Cuevas 55'	Stadium: Estadio Nemesio Díez; Referee: Luis Daniel Chávez

3 March 2018 9	América	2–1	Pachuca	Tlalpan, Mexico City
16:00	Cázares 10'; Hernández 66'	Report	García 75'	Stadium: Estadio Azteca; Referee: Michel Caballero

10 March 2018 10	Veracruz	1–1	América	Boca del Río, Veracruz
9:15	Viveros 50' (pen.)	Report	C. Cuevas 48'	Stadium: Estadio Luis "Pirata" Fuente; Referee: Arturo González

18 March 2018 11	Cruz Azul	0–4	América	Benito Juárez, Mexico City
11:00		Report	Espinosa 4', 87'; Cázares 67'; L. Cuevas 89'	Stadium: Estadio Azul; Referee: Mario Terrazas

26 March 2018 12	América	3–0	Tijuana	Tlalpan, Mexico City
20:00	L. Cuevas 50', 68'; Fuentes 63'	Report		Stadium: Estadio Azteca; Referee: Priscila Pérez

2 April 2018 13	Morelia	1–12	América	Morelia, Michoacán
16:00	Jiménez 16'	Report	Hernández 18', 83'; Cázares 29', 55', 71'; L. Cuevas 38', 41', 69', 89'; C. Cuevas 53', 59'; Fuentes 63'	Stadium: Estadio Morelos; Referee: Eduardo Vázquez

9 April 2018 14	América	1–0	UNAM	Tlalpan, Mexico City
20:00	Cázares 52'	Report		Stadium: Estadio Azteca; Referee: Michel Caballero

==== Playoffs ====
===== Semifinals =====
16 April 2018 First leg	UANL	3–0	América	San Nicolás de los Garza, Nuevo León
20:00	B. Solís 17'; Jaramillo 41'; Cruz 46'	Report		Stadium: Estadio Universitario; Referee: Priscila Pérez

22 April 2018 Second leg	América	2–1 (2–4 agg.)	UANL	Tlalpan, Mexico City
17:00	Fuentes 10'; Antonio 74' (o.g.)	Report	Ovalle 61'	Stadium: Estadio Azteca; Referee: Antonio Olalde

== Statistics ==
=== Appearances and goals ===
No.	Pos	Nat	Player	Total		Apertura		Clausura	
No.	Pos	Nat	Player	Apps	Goals	Apps	Goals	Apps	Goals
1	GK	(Mexico) MEX	Cecilia Santiago	26	0	13	0	13	0
2	DF	(Mexico) MEX	Daniela Alcantar	6	0	5	0	1	0
3	DF	(Mexico) MEX	Marylin Díaz	30	3	15	1	15	2
4	DF	(Mexico) MEX	Ana Lozada	30	1	15	0	15	1
5	DF	(Mexico) MEX	Ximena Ríos	18	1	9	1	9	0
6	MF	(Mexico) MEX	Diana Fierro	21	2	9	1	12	1
7	MF	(Mexico) MEX	Dayana Cázares	26	18	15	11	11	7
8	MF	(Mexico) MEX	Alexia Delgado	17	0	14	0	3	0
9	FW	(Mexico) MEX	Lucero Cuevas	31	31	16	16	15	15
10	FW	(Mexico) MEX	Daniela Espinosa	25	13	14	9	11	4
11	MF	(Mexico) MEX	Montserrat Hernández	26	7	15	4	11	3
12	DF	(Mexico) MEX	Estefanía Fuentes	12	0	0	0	12	0
14	DF	(Mexico) MEX	Mónica Rodríguez	25	0	13	0	12	0
15	DF	(Mexico) MEX	Julieta Peralta	15	0	8	0	7	0
17	MF	(Mexico) MEX	Edna Santamaría	25	2	12	1	13	1
18	FW	(Mexico) MEX	Casandra Cuevas	32	15	16	6	16	9
19	DF	(Mexico) MEX	Zulma Hernández	21	0	10	0	11	0
20	MF	(Mexico) MEX	Paloma Espino	4	0	4	0	0	0
21	MF	(Mexico) MEX	Esmeralda Verdugo	12	1	0	0	12	1
22	FW	(Mexico) MEX	Alexia Villanueva	2	0	0	0	2	0
23	GK	(Mexico) MEX	Maricruz González	2	0	1	0	1	0
24	GK	(Mexico) MEX	Jaidy Gutiérrez	6	0	3	0	3	0
25	DF	(Mexico) MEX	Jana Gutiérrez	4	0	0	0	4	0
26	DF	(Mexico) MEX	Alma Verania López	6	0	0	0	6	0
27	DF	(Mexico) MEX	Laura Parra	8	0	0	0	8	0
Players that left the club during the season
12	MF	(Mexico) MEX	Melissa Arredondo	1	0	1	0	0	0
16	MF	(Mexico) MEX	Alexandra Martínez	11	0	11	0	0	0

=== Goalscorers ===
Rank	Pos.	No.	Player	Apertura	Clausura	Total
1	FW	9	(Mexico) Lucero Cuevas	16	15	31
2	MF	7	(Mexico) Dayana Cázares	11	7	18
3	FW	18	(Mexico) Casandra Cuevas	6	9	15
4	FW	10	(Mexico) Daniela Espinosa	9	4	13
5	MF	11	(Mexico) Montserrat Hernández	4	3	7
6	DF	12	(Mexico) Estefanía Fuentes	0	4	4
7	DF	3	(Mexico) Marylin Díaz	1	2	3
8	MF	6	(Mexico) Diana Fierro	1	1	2
8	MF	17	(Mexico) Edna Santamaría	1	1	2
10	DF	4	(Mexico) Ana Lozada	0	1	1
10	DF	5	(Mexico) Ximena Ríos	1	0	1
10	MF	21	(Mexico) Esmeralda Verdugo	0	1	1
Own goals				2	1	3
Total				52	49	101

=== Hat-tricks ===
Player	Against	Result	Date	Competition	Ref.
(Mexico) Lucero Cuevas	Cruz Azul	5–0 (A)	4 August 2017	Liga MX Femenil	
(Mexico) Daniela Espinosa	Veracruz	8–1 (A)	9 September 2017	Liga MX Femenil	
(Mexico) Dayana Cázares	Morelia	12–1 (A)	2 April 2018	Liga MX Femenil	
(Mexico) Lucero Cuevas	Morelia	12–1 (A)	2 April 2018	Liga MX Femenil	
