= 2013 CONCACAF Women's U-17 Championship squads =

This article lists the squads for the 2013 CONCACAF Women's U-17 Championship, to be held in Jamaica. The 8 national teams involved in the tournament were required to register a squad of 20 players; only players in these squads were eligible to take part in the tournament.

Players marked (c) were named as captain for their national squad.

== Group A ==
=== El Salvador ===
Coach: Geovanni Trigueros

No.	Pos.	Player	Date of birth (age)	Caps	Goals	Club
1	GK	Eleonor Zelaya	19 April 1999 (aged 14)			
18	GK	Ana Coreas				
2	DF	Ingrid Martinez				
3	DF	Bianca Torres				
4	DF	Elaily Represa				
5	DF	Fátima Bermúdez				
6	DF	Daniela Bernal				
7	MF	Brenda Delgado				
8	MF	Sandra Maravilla				
9	MF	Ashly Montoya				
10	MF	Maggi Romero				
14	MF	Astrid Flores				
16	MF	Katerin Carpio				
17	MF	Mayra Aguilar				
20	MF	Sofia Tripp				
11	FW	Evelyn Pena				
15	FW	Alejandra Alvayero				
18	FW	Maritza Rodríguez				
19	FW	Lesly Rivera				
21	FW	Yoselin Aguilar				

=== Haiti ===
Coach:

=== Jamaica ===
Coach: Vinimore Blaine

No.	Pos.	Player	Date of birth (age)	Caps	Goals	Club
1	GK	Lotteafa Clarke				
13	GK	Shanay Ricketts	28 December 1997 (aged 15)			
2	DF	Sashine Smith				
4	DF	Cachet Lue	26 March 1997 (aged 16)			
5	DF	Konya Plummer	2 August 1997 (aged 16)			
6	DF	Melissa Hamilton				
14	DF	Deneisha Blackwood	7 March 1997 (aged 16)			
15	DF	Carlletia Savizon				
20	DF	Amoya Crawford				
7	MF	Petegay Planter				
8	MF	Asheina Nelson				
9	MF	Asia Lee-Fatt				
10	MF	Felicia Davidson				
11	MF	Khadija Shaw	31 January 1997 (aged 16)			
12	MF	Jorja Hughes				
16	MF	Cheyenne Wakeland-Hart				
17	MF	Samantha Sanfilippo				
19	MF	Robyn-Anne Whittaker				
21	MF	Jessica Johnson				
18	FW	Camille Nurse				

=== Mexico ===
Coach: Leonardo Cuéllar

No.	Pos.	Player	Date of birth (age)	Caps	Goals	Club
1	GK	Emily Alvarado	9 June 1998 (aged 15)			
12	GK	Miriam Aguirre	29 January 1999 (aged 14)			
2	DF	Miriam García	14 February 1998 (aged 15)			
3	DF	Vanessa Flores	26 May 1997 (aged 16)			
4	DF	Rebeca Bernal	31 August 1997 (aged 16)			
5	DF	Gabriela Martínez				
13	DF	Mónica Rodríguez	3 August 1998 (aged 15)			
15	DF	Jessica Moreno				
17	DF	Natalia Villarreal	19 March 1998 (aged 15)			
6	MF	Eva González	22 April 1997 (aged 16)			
7	MF	Aylin Villalobos	2 October 1997 (aged 16)			
8	MF	Briana Woodall	10 August 1998 (aged 15)			
14	MF	Arlett Tovar	9 May 1997 (aged 16)			
18	MF	Belén Cruz	7 November 1998 (aged 14)			
19	MF	Marianna Maldonado	5 August 1999 (aged 14)			
20	MF	Jaquelín García	23 December 1997 (aged 15)			
9	FW	Janae González	3 March 1997 (aged 16)			
10	FW	Casandra Cuevas	21 April 1997 (aged 16)			
11	FW	Montserrat Hernández	26 June 1999 (aged 14)			
16	FW	Cinthia Huerta	29 April 1998 (aged 15)			

== Group B ==
=== Canada ===
Coach: Beverly Priestman

No.	Pos.	Player	Date of birth (age)	Caps	Goals	Club
1	GK	Rylee Foster		5	0	(Canadian Soccer Association) Woodbridge Strikers
18	GK	Devon Kerr		0	0	(Canadian Soccer Association) Glen Shields FC
12	DF	Easther Mayi Kith		2	0	(Canadian Soccer Association) Laser de Joliette
5	DF	Mika Richards		2	0	(Canadian Soccer Association) Brams United
3	DF	Rachel Jones		5	0	(Canadian Soccer Association) Vancouver Whitecaps FC Girls Elite
15	DF	Nadia Pestell		1	0	(Canadian Soccer Association) Brams United
6	DF	Bianca St-Georges		5	0	(Canadian Soccer Association) Laser de Joliette
2	DF	Simmrin Dhaliwal		5	0	(Canadian Soccer Association) Vancouver Whitecaps FC Girls Elite
14	MF	Jenna Baxter		2	0	(Canadian Soccer Association) Vancouver Whitecaps FC Girls Elite
8	MF	Jessie Fleming (c)		5	3	(Canadian Soccer Association) London NorWest SC
10	MF	Sarah Kinzner		5	1	(Canadian Soccer Association) Calgary Foothills WFC
13	MF	Avery Lakeman		1	0	(Canadian Soccer Association) Edmonton Drillers
4	MF	Karima Lemire		5	0	(Canadian Soccer Association) AS Varennes
16	MF	Sarah Stratigakis		4	0	(Canadian Soccer Association) Woodbridge Strikers
9	FW	Emily Borgmann		5	5	(Canadian Soccer Association) Burlington SC
20	FW	Nadya Gill		3	4	(Canadian Soccer Association) Vaughan SC
17	FW	Anyssa Ibrahim		1	0	(Canadian Soccer Association) AS Terrebonne
7	FW	Marie Levasseur		5	5	(Canadian Soccer Association) Haute St-Charles
19	FW	Jessica Lisi		2	0	(Canadian Soccer Association) Woodbridge Strikers
11	FW	Marie-Mychèle Métivier		5	6	(Canadian Soccer Association) Armada Chaudière-Est

=== Guatemala ===
Coach:

No.	Pos.	Player	Date of birth (age)	Caps	Goals	Club
1	GK	Angie Hidalgo				
12	GK	Natalie Schaps	19 February 1999 (aged 14)			
2	DF	Isabella Salas	10 September 1998 (aged 15)			
3	DF	Sara Fetzer	12 April 1999 (aged 14)			
4	DF	Pamela Monterroso	8 June 1997 (aged 16)			
13	DF	Lesli Cal Gamarro				
14	DF	Maria Barillas	19 September 1998 (aged 15)			
16	DF	Kellin Mayén	26 July 1999 (aged 14)			
5	MF	Alison Garcia	14 October 1997 (aged 16)			
6	MF	Jeniffer Barrios	14 October 1997 (aged 16)			
15	MF	Cindy Granda				
17	MF	Maria Contreras				
7	FW	Mimi Castellanos				
8	FW	Laurent Marksmith				
9	FW	Madelyn Ventura	13 February 1997 (aged 16)			
10	FW	Aisha Solórzano	13 April 1998 (aged 15)			
11	FW	Andrea Sosa				
18	FW	Hercilia Cabrera				
19	FW	Anika Schaps	19 February 1999 (aged 14)			
20	FW	Beberly Montufar				

=== United States ===
Coach: B. J. Snow

No.	Pos.	Player	Date of birth (age)	Caps	Goals	Club
18	GK	Kat Hess	2 October 1998 (aged 15)			(United States Soccer Federation) LA Premier
1	GK	Lauren Rood	9 October 1997 (aged 16)			(United States Soccer Federation) Washington Timbers
5	DF	Gabriella Carreiro	5 September 1997 (aged 16)			(United States Soccer Federation) FC Stars of Mass.
7	DF	Mia Gyau	22 June 1998 (aged 15)			(United States Soccer Federation) Bethesda Lions
6	DF	Natalie Jacobs	16 August 1997 (aged 16)			(United States Soccer Federation) Slammers FC
10	DF	Ellie Jean	31 January 1997 (aged 16)			(United States Soccer Federation) Oakwood SC
12	DF	Tegan McGrady	11 October 1997 (aged 16)			(United States Soccer Federation) MVLA SC
9	DF	Zoe Morse	1 April 1998 (aged 15)			(United States Soccer Federation) Michigan Hawks
13	DF	Taylor Otto	23 October 1997 (aged 16)			(United States Soccer Federation) CASL
2	MF	Dorian Bailey	28 January 1997 (aged 16)			(United States Soccer Federation) Sporting BVSC
4	MF	Marley Canales	16 November 1997 (aged 15)			(United States Soccer Federation) San Diego Surf
14	MF	Taylor Racioppi	26 February 1997 (aged 16)			(United States Soccer Federation) PDA Clash
19	MF	Anika Rodriguez	4 January 1997 (aged 16)			(United States Soccer Federation) So Cal Blues
25	MF	Frankie Tagliaferri	18 January 1999 (aged 14)			(United States Soccer Federation) PDA
3	FW	Madison Haley	25 October 1998 (aged 15)			(United States Soccer Federation) Dallas Texans
8	FW	Kelcie Hedge	19 September 1997 (aged 16)			(United States Soccer Federation) Washington Premier
11	FW	Civana Kuhlmann	14 April 1999 (aged 14)			(United States Soccer Federation) Colorado Rush
17	FW	Mallory Pugh	29 April 1998 (aged 15)			(United States Soccer Federation) Real Colorado
15	FW	Zoe Redei	8 October 1997 (aged 16)			(United States Soccer Federation) Eclipse Select
22	FW	Madison Schultz	20 January 1998 (aged 15)			(United States Soccer Federation) Northwest Nationals
