= Alexia Delgado =

Mexican footballer (born 1999)

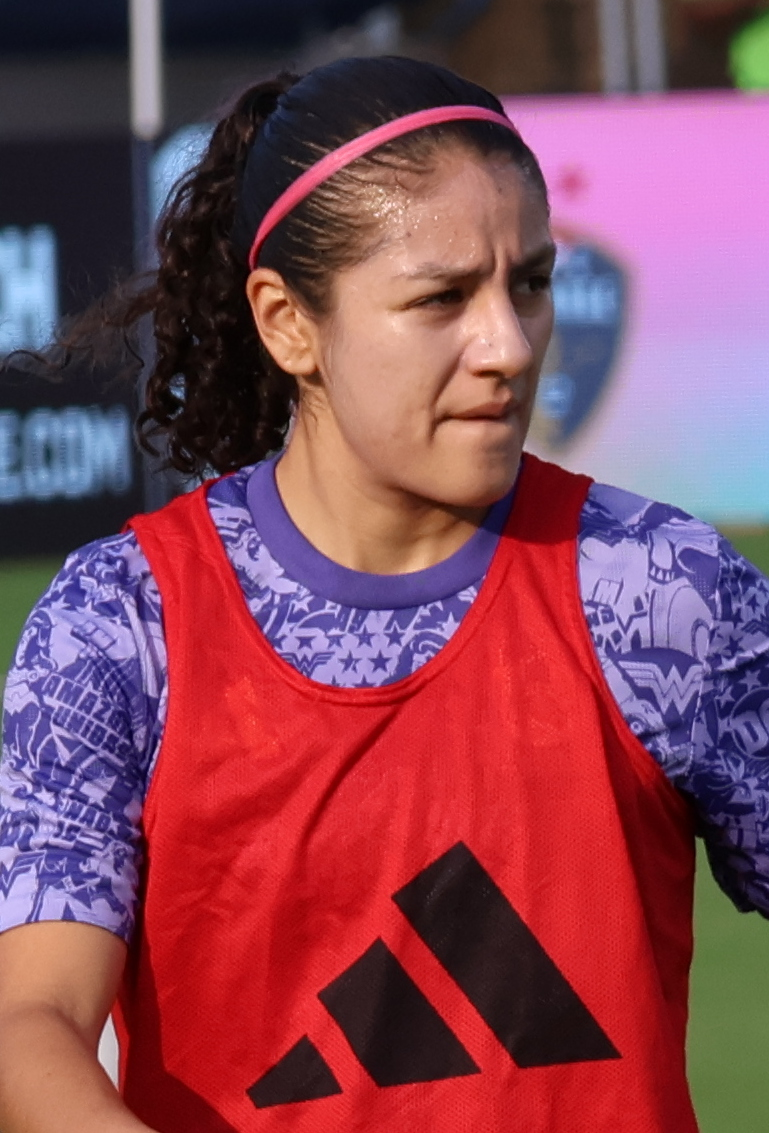
- Delgado with Tigres UANL in 2025

Personal information
- Full name: Alexia Fernanda Delgado Alvarado
- Date of birth: 9 December 1999 (age 26)
- Place of birth: Tepic, Nayarit, Mexico
- Height: 1.63 m (5 ft 4 in)
- Position: Defensive midfielder

Team information
- Current team: Tigres UANL
- Number: 8

College career
Years	Team	Apps	(Gls)
2018–2022	Arizona State Sun Devils	82	(11)

Senior career*
Years	Team	Apps	(Gls)
2017–2018	América	18	(0)
2023	Cruz Azul	13	(1)
2023–	Tigres UANL	67	(2)

International career^{‡}
2014	Mexico U15	4	(0)
2016	Mexico U17	4+	(0)
2018	Mexico U20	4	(0)
2019–	Mexico	53	(2)
Medal record
Women's football
Representing Mexico
Pan American Games
Gold medal – first place	2023 Santiago	Team
Central American and Caribbean Games
Gold medal – first place	2023 San Salvador	Team
Summer Youth Olympics
Bronze medal – third place	2014 Nanjing	Team
- * Club domestic league appearances and goals as of 2 September 2025 ‡ National team caps and goals as of 8 April 2025

Alexia Fernanda Delgado Alvarado (born 9 December 1999) is a Mexican professional footballer who plays as a midfielder for Liga MX Femenil club Tigres UANL and the Mexico national team.

== Early life ==
Born in Tepic, Nayarit, Mexico, Delgado is one of three children to her parents, Sonia Alvarado and Francisco Delgado Mejia. Her mother was a gymnast and her father and an uncle played football, the uncle professionally. At the age of six, Delgado began doing gymnastics alongside her sister, Goretti, and also tried ballet before realizing the sports weren't for her. A few years later, her brother Francisco began playing football at school, and after convincing her parents to let her try the sport, Delgado began playing on Francisco's team. As there were no girls' football teams in Tepic, Delgado played with the boys until she was 13 years old.

Delgado was scouted in Tepic by Leonardo Cuéllar, at the time the head coach of the Mexico women's national team, and was offered a spot at the Centro de Formación de Guadalajara. For two days every two weeks, Delgado and her father took a three-hour bus trip from Tepic to Guadalajara for her training sessions. After a year, she moved in with the family of another player at the training center to be able to practice daily. Delgado attended the Colegio SuBiré in Zapopan, where she was the captain of the school team and won the Copa Coca-Cola, which earned the team a trip to attend the 2014 FIFA World Cup.

While playing for América, Delgado attended the University of Guadalajara, studying virtually towards a degree in interdisciplinary areas. She graduated from Arizona State University with a bachelor's degree in sports business and a master's degree in organizational leadership.

== Club career ==
Delgado debuted for América in 2017–18, the inaugural season of the Liga MX Femenil. She played 21 matches in all competitions, with 18 of those coming in the league.

In 2018, Delgado moved to the United States to play college soccer for the Arizona State Sun Devils.

== International career ==
Delgado was selected to the Mexico national teams for the first time in 2014, called up to the Mexico women's under-15 national team for the 2014 Summer Youth Olympics. She played all four games at the tournament, helping Mexico earn a bronze medal. Delgado then stepped to the under-17 team, appearing at the 2016 CONCACAF Women's U-17 Championship and the 2016 FIFA U-17 Women's World Cup. With the under-20 national team, Delgado won the 2018 CONCACAF Women's U-20 Championship, Mexico's first-ever championship in the age-group tournament. She appeared at the 2018 FIFA U-20 Women's World Cup as Mexico were eliminated in the group stage.

Delgado made her senior debut on 1 March 2019 in a friendly match against Thailand. She was selected to represent Mexico at the 2023 Pan American Games held in Santiago, Chile, where the Mexican squad went undefeated to win the gold medal for the first time in their history, defeating Chile 1–0 in the gold medal match.

== Career statistics ==
=== Club ===
As of 28 November 2023

Appearances and goals by club, season and competition
Club	Season	League			Cup (Note: Includes the Copa MX Femenil)		Other		Total	
Club	Season	Division	Apps	Goals	Apps	Goals	Apps	Goals	Apps	Goals
América	2017–18	Liga MX Femenil	18	0	3	0	—		21	0
Cruz Azul	2022–23	Liga MX Femenil	13	1	—		—		13	1
Tigres UANL	2023–24	Liga MX Femenil	22	0	—		0	0	22	0
Career total			53	1	3	0	0	0	56	1

=== International ===
As of 8 April 2025

Appearances and goals by national team and year
National team	Year	Apps	Goals
Mexico	2019	5	0
Mexico	2020	3	0
Mexico	2021	3	0
Mexico	2022	8	0
Mexico	2023	15	1
Mexico	2024	14	0
Mexico	2025	5	1
Total		53	2

International goals
No.	Date	Venue	Opponent	Score	Result	Competition
1.	26 September 2023	Estadio Hidalgo, Pachuca, Mexico	Trinidad and Tobago	4–0	6–0	2024 CONCACAF W Gold Cup qualification
2.	5 April 2025	CPKC Stadium, Kansas City, United States	Jamaica	1–0	3–0	Friendly
3.	2 March 2026	Daren Sammy Cricket Ground, Gros Islet, Saint Lucia	Saint Lucia	5–0	7–0	2026 CONCACAF W Championship qualification
4.	18 April 2026	Estadio Nemesio Díez, Toluca, Mexico	Puerto Rico	1–0	6–0	2026 CONCACAF W Championship qualification

== Honours ==
Mexico

- Central American and Caribbean Games: 2023
- Pan American Games: 2023

Mexico under-20

- CONCACAF Women's U-20 Championship: 2018

Tigres UANL

- Liga MX Femenil: Apertura 2023
- Campeón de Campeonas: 2023

Individual

- All-Pac-12 Conference Second Team: 2021, 2022
- United Soccer Coaches All-Pacific Region First Team: 2021
- United Soccer Coaches All-Pacific Region Second Team: 2022

== See also ==
- List of Mexico women's international footballers
- List of Pan American Games medalists in football
- Mexico at the 2014 Summer Youth Olympics
