= Daniela Espinosa =

Mexican footballer (born 1999)

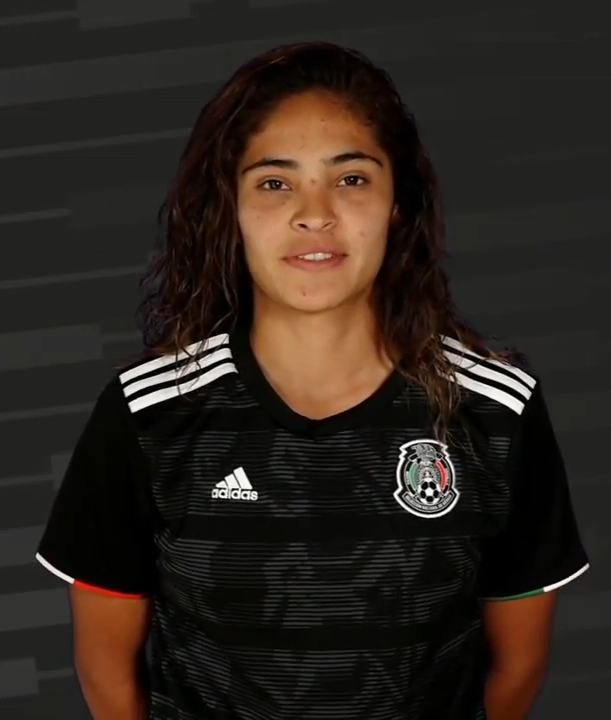
- Espinosa in 2019

Personal information
- Full name: Daniela Espinosa Arce
- Date of birth: 13 July 1999 (age 27)
- Place of birth: Cabo San Lucas, Baja California Sur, Mexico
- Height: 1.68 m (5 ft 6 in)
- Position: Striker

Team information
- Current team: Toluca
- Number: 7

Senior career*
Years	Team	Apps	(Gls)
2017–2022	América	157	(75)
2022	→ Tijuana (loan)	19	(3)
2023–2024	Tijuana	64	(26)
2025–	América	22	(9)
2026–	→ Toluca (loan)	0	(0)

International career^{‡}
2014	Mexico U15	4	(3)
2015–2016	Mexico U17	5+	(4)
2016–2018	Mexico U20	7	(0)
2018–2023	Mexico	21	(0)
- * Club domestic league appearances and goals as of 24 May 2026 ‡ National team caps and goals as of 10 April 2021

Daniela Espinosa Arce (born 13 July 1999) is a Mexican professional footballer who plays as a forward for Liga Femenil club Toluca on loan from América.

== International career ==
Espinosa represented Mexico at the 2014 Summer Youth Olympics, the 2016 CONCACAF Women's U-17 Championship, the 2016 FIFA U-17 Women's World Cup, the 2018 CONCACAF Women's U-20 Championship and the 2018 FIFA U-20 Women's World Cup. She made her senior debut on 27 February 2019 in a friendly match against Italy.

== Honors and awards ==
=== Club ===
Club América

- Liga MX Femenil: Apertura 2018, Clausura 2026
- CONCACAF W Champions Cup: 2025–26

=== International ===
Mexico U20

- CONCACAF Women's U-20 Championship: 2018
