= Women's football in Mexico =

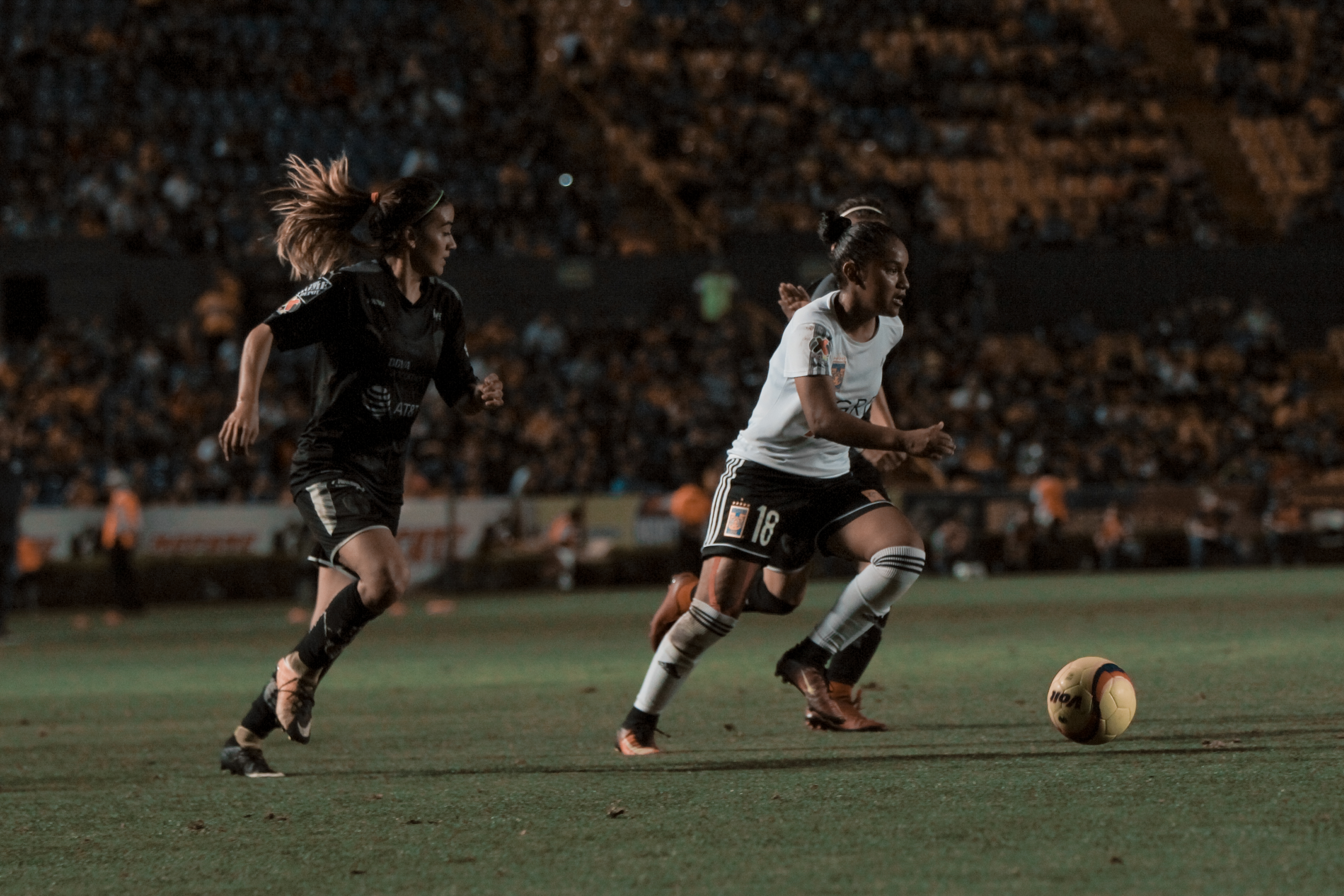
- Belén Cruz, professional football Midfielder
- Country: Mexico
- Governing body: Mexican Football Federation
- National team: Women's national team

National competitions
- Liga MX Femenil; Liga Mexicana de Fútbol Femenil

International competitions
- Olympics; FIFA Women's World Cup (National Team); CONCACAF Women's Championship (National Team)

Women's association football has long been a largely amateur sport in Mexico, given the greater emphasis of the male competitions. However, with the establishment of Liga MX Femenil and rapid growth since 2021, women's football in Mexico has raised its profile enough to compete for sponsors and professional international talent not only within Mexico, but also from Europe, Africa, South America, and the United States.The growth of Liga MX Femenil has increased the visibility and professional development of women's football in Mexico in recent years.

== History ==
The second Unofficial World Championships with women's national football teams was hosted by Mexico in 1971. Recently, the game has grown in the country with the introduction of a women's professional league. The final was won by Denmark was played at Estadio Azteca, in front of 112,500 attendees. Recent research suggests that the professionalization of Liga MX Femenil has contributed to the continued growth and visibility of women's football in Mexico, while also creating new opportunities for women in the sport.

== Domestic league ==
Liga MX Femenil is the top women's national football league in Mexico, and it was started in 2016.

In May 2018, Liga MX Femenil set the all-time world attendance record for a women's club match by drawing 51,211 to the second leg of the 2018 Clausura final. In 2022, Tigres UANL signed United States prospect Mia Fishel, who became the league's first foreign golden boot winner in the 2022 Apertura, and Nigerian national team striker Uchenna Kanu, while C.F. Pachuca signed Spanish national team star Jenni Hermoso, and Club América signed Spanish internationals Andrea Pereira and Andrea Falcón.

The 2022 Apertura final between Tigres and Club América set a league record for attendance in the first leg with 52,654, and a Mexican-audience television viewership record with 2.8 million viewers.

In March 2023, Nike, Inc. became a major league sponsor, and its first major sponsor not shared with the men's Liga MX.

Liga Mexicana de Fútbol Femenil was a previous attempt to grow women's soccer in Mexico.

Liga MX Femenil announced a rebrand in 2025, and changes to its competition format aimed at continuing the league's growth. Teams now play 14 regular-season matches, and the rebrand to Liga Femenil BBVA was introduced as part of an effort to establish a stronger independent identity for the league.

== National team ==
The national team has qualified for the World Cup three times: in 1999, 2011, and 2015. Many of their players have American heritage.The continued success of the Liga MX Femenil has helped strengthen the development of players for the Mexico women's national football team.
