= Eleisa Santos =

Mexican footballer (born 1997)

Personal information
- Full name: Eleisa Santos Reyes
- Date of birth: 15 July 1997 (age 29)
- Place of birth: Zimatlán de Álvarez, Oaxaca, Mexico
- Height: 1.59 m (5 ft 3 in)
- Position: Centre-back

Team information
- Current team: Puebla
- Number: 32

Senior career*
Years	Team	Apps	(Gls)
2017–2018	Morelia	44	(4)
2019–2020	América	6	(0)
2021–2022	Cruz Azul	20	(0)
2025–	Puebla	10	(0)
- * Club domestic league appearances and goals as of 4 June 2023

Eleisa Santos Reyes (born 15 July 1997) is a Mexican professional footballer who plays as a centre-back for Liga MX Femenil side Puebla.

== Club career ==
In 2017, she started her career in Morelia. In 2019, she was transferred to América. In 2021, she signed with Cruz Azul. Since 2025, she is part of Puebla.
