= Jaidy Gutiérrez =

Mexican footballer (born 2001)

Personal information
- Full name: Jaidy Janay Gutiérrez Campos
- Date of birth: 24 October 2001 (age 25)
- Place of birth: Mexico City, Mexico
- Height: 1.68 m (5 ft 6 in)
- Position: Goalkeeper

Team information
- Current team: América
- Number: 23

College career
Years	Team	Apps	(Gls)
2021–2023	South Alabama Jaguars	52	
2024–2025	Oklahoma State Cowgirls		

Senior career*
Years	Team	Apps	(Gls)
2017–2020	América	44	(0)
2026	Puebla	14	(0)
2026–	América	0	(0)

International career^{‡}
2018	Mexico U-17		
- * Club domestic league appearances and goals as of 2 February 2026 ‡ National team caps and goals as of 17 May 2024

Jaidy Janay Gutiérrez Campos (born 24 October 2001) is a Mexican professional footballer who plays goalkeeper for Liga Femenil side Club América.

== Career ==
Although she practiced gymnastics as a child, Jaidy Gutiérrez chose soccer as a professional sport. She began playing amateur as a goalkeeper in an amateur league of the Guadalajara Club in Mexico City, where she took that position when there was a lack of players to complete her position. She continued her sports career and tried out for Club América Femenil, where coach Leonardo Cuéllar admitted her as part of the squad of said team, where she is a substitute for goalkeeper Cecilia Santiago. She wears number 24 in the capital club, and she debuted on 15 October 2017 in a match against the Pachuca Femenil Soccer Club when she was fifteen years old.

She is part of a soccer family: her father is Miguel "Jalisco" Gutiérrez, a former player for different first and second division teams in Mexico, while her sister Jana Gutiérrez is a player for the Club America Femenil(women) soccer club; Previously, both were teammates at Club América.

== Statistics ==
Updated to last match played on 18 January 2019.

Club	Div.	Season	Suspenders national^{(1)}		National cups^{(1)}		International cups		Total		Average scorer^{(3)}
Club	Div.	Season	Part.	Goals	Part.	Goals	Part.	Goals	Part.	Goals	Average scorer^{(3)}
Club América FemenilMexico
Club América FemenilMexico	1.ª
Club América FemenilMexico	1.ª	A-2017	3	-4	0	0	0	0	3	-4	1.33
Club América FemenilMexico	1.ª	C-2018	3	-3	0	0	0	0	3	-3	1.00
Club América FemenilMexico	1.ª	A-2018	9	-6	0	0	0	0	9	-6	0.66
Club América FemenilMexico	1.ª	C-2019	2	-3	0	0	0	0	2	-3	1.50
Club América FemenilMexico	1.ª	A-2019	19	-18	0	0	0	0	19	-18	0.94
Club América FemenilMexico	Total club		36	-34	0	0	0	0	36	-34	0.94
Total career			36	-34	0	0	0	0	36	-34	0.94
^{(2)} Includes data from the Mexican Women's First Division (2017-Act.).^{(2)} Includes data from Copa MX Femenil (2017-Act.).

== National team ==
In 2018, she was called up to the Mexico women's U-17 soccer team to play in the 2018 U-17 Women's Soccer World Cup, where she made her World Cup debut on 13 November 2018 in a game against the national team from South Africa.

=== Participations in World Cups ===
World	Campus	Result	Matches	Goals
2018 U-17 Women's World Cup	Uruguay	First phase	3	0

== Honors ==
=== National championships ===
Qualification	Club	Country	Year
First division	America	Mexico	2018
