= Mercedes Rodríguez =

Mexican football manager

Personal information
- Full name: Mercedes Rodríguez Alemán
- Date of birth: 24 September 1959 (age 67)
- Place of birth: Torreón, Coahuila, Mexico
- Height: 1.54 m (5 ft 1 in)

Managerial career
- Years: Team
- 1999: Mexico (women) (Assistant)
- 2018: Puebla (women) (Assistant)
- 2018–2019: Cruz Azul (women) (Assistant)
- 2023–2025: Mazatlán U-19 (women)
- 2025: Mazatlán (women)

Mercedes Rodríguez Alemán (born 24 September 1959) is a Mexican manager who was the manager for Mazatlán (women).

== Coaching career ==
Rodríguez started her coaching career as assistant in Mexico (women) on the 1999 FIFA Women's World Cup. In 2018, she joined the staff of Puebla (women) in the Liga MX Femenil. The next season she joined the staff of Cruz Azul (women).

In 2023, she signed with Mazatlán U-19 (women). In 2025, Rodríguez was promoted as head coach of the first team.
