= Sabina Velázquez =

Mexican footballer (born 2000)

Personal information
- Full name: Reyna Sabina Velázquez Mejía
- Date of birth: 6 January 2000 (age 26)
- Place of birth: Ciudad Nezahualcóyotl, State of Mexico, Mexico
- Height: 1.61 m (5 ft 3 in)
- Position: Centre-back

Senior career*
Years	Team	Apps	(Gls)
2017–2019	Cruz Azul	56	(4)
2020	América	0	(0)
2020–2024	Necaxa	111	(4)
2025–2026	Mazatlán	10	(0)
- * Club domestic league appearances and goals as of 4 June 2023

Reyna Sabina Velázquez Mejía (born 6 January 2000) is a Mexican professional footballer who plays as an Left back.

== Career ==
In 2017, she started her career in Cruz Azul. In 2020, she was transferred to América. The next season, she joined to Necaxa. In 2025, she signed with Mazatlán.
