= Paola Selvas =

Mexican footballer (born 1999)

Personal information
- Full name: Paola Selvas Ríos
- Date of birth: 13 August 1999 (age 27)
- Place of birth: Miguel Hidalgo, Mexico City, Mexico
- Height: 1.60 m (5 ft 3 in)
- Position: Forward

Senior career*
Years	Team	Apps	(Gls)
2018	UNAM	0	(0)
2018–2019	Puebla	1	(0)
2019	Querétaro	0	(0)
2020–2026	Mazatlán	51	(0)
- * Club domestic league appearances and goals as of 9 February 2026

Paola Selvas Ríos (born 13 August 1999) is a Mexican professional footballer who plays as a centre-back.

== Career ==
In 2018, she started her career in UNAM. The next season she joined to Puebla. In 2020, she got transferred to Mazatlán.
