= Mariana Munguía =

Mexican footballer (born 2003)

Personal information
- Full name: Mariana Munguía Haros
- Date of birth: 11 January 2003 (age 23)
- Place of birth: Hermosillo, Sonora, Mexico
- Height: 1.75 m (5 ft 9 in)
- Position: Forward

Team information
- Current team: Tijuana
- Number: 19

Senior career*
Years	Team	Apps	(Gls)
2019–	Tijuana	86	(2)
2023	→ Pachuca (loan)	3	(1)

International career^{‡}
2019	Mexico U-17		
- * Club domestic league appearances and goals as of 9 February 2026 ‡ National team caps and goals as of 12 March 2022

Mariana Munguía Haros (born 11 January 2003) is a Mexican professional footballer who plays as a forward for Liga MX Femenil side Tijuana.

== Career ==
In 2019, Munguía started her career in Tijuana. In 2023, she joined Pachuca.
