= Football at the 2014 Summer Youth Olympics – Girls' tournament =

2014 Girls' Youth Olympic Football Tournament

Tournament details
- Host country: China
- Dates: 14–26 August 2014 (12 days)
- Teams: 6 (from 6 confederations)
- Venues: 2 (in 1 host city)

Final positions
- Champions: China (1st title)
- Runners-up: Venezuela
- Third place: Mexico
- Fourth place: Slovakia

Tournament statistics
- Matches played: 11
- Goals scored: 56 (5.09 per match)
- Attendance: 67,190 (6,108 per match)
- Top scorer(s): (Venezuela) Deyna Castellanos (7 goals)
- Fair play award: Mexico

The girls' football tournament at the 2014 Summer Youth Olympics took place at the Wutaishan Stadium and the Jiangning Sports Center, both located in Nanjing, China, between 14–26 August 2014.

Each match lasted 80 minutes, consisting of two periods of 40 minutes, with an interval of 15 minutes.

== Participating teams ==
One team from each continental confederation participated in the tournament. The same country may not participate in both the boys' and girls' tournament. As hosts, China was given Asia's spot to compete in the girls' tournament (and thus could not participate in the boys' tournament). Teams may qualify through preliminary competitions, or be nominated for participation by their confederation, with the invited teams ratified by FIFA during their meeting in Zürich on 3–4 October 2013.

Confederation	Team	Qualification method
Africa (CAF)	Namibia	Invited
Asia (AFC)	China	Hosts
Europe (UEFA)	Slovakia	Four-team Youth Olympic qualifying tournament (Nyon, Switzerland, 14–16 October 2013)
North America (CONCACAF)	Mexico	Invited
Oceania (OFC)	Papua New Guinea	Invited
South America (CONMEBOL)	Venezuela	2013 South American Under-17 Women's Championship (Paraguay, 12–29 September 2013)

== Squads ==
Players must be 15 years old (born between 1 January and 31 December 1999) to be eligible to participate. Each team consisted of 18 players (two of whom must be goalkeepers).

== Match officials ==
A total of six referees and twelve assistant referees were appointed by FIFA for the tournament.

Confederation	Referees	Assistant referees
AFC	(China) He Jin	(China) Cui Yongmei (Iran) Ensieh Khabaz Mafinezhad
CAF	(Zambia) Gladys Lengwe	(Ghana) Emmanuella Aglago (Malawi) Bernadettar Kwimbira
CONCACAF	(United States) Christina Unkel	(Jamaica) Princess Brown (Cayman Islands) Wendy Fisher
CONMEBOL	(Paraguay) Olga Miranda Villarreal	(Bolivia) Liliana Bejarano Albornoz (Chile) Loreto Toloza Cravero
OFC	(New Zealand) Anna-Marie Keighley	(New Zealand) Nadia Browning (Tonga) Lata I Sia Kaumatule
UEFA	(United Kingdom) Morag Pirie^{†}	(France) Manuela Nicolosi (Romania) Petruta Claudia Iugulescu

^{†} Morag Pirie is affiliated with the Football Association of Scotland. Since Scotland is not a member of the IOC, she is listed by the IOC under Great Britain.

== Group stage ==
The draw was held at the Hilton Hotel in Nanjing on 14 May 2014. The winners and runners-up of each group advance to the semi-finals. The rankings of teams in each group are determined as follows:

1. points obtained in all group matches;
2. goal difference in all group matches;
3. number of goals scored in all group matches;

If two or more teams are equal on the basis of the above three criteria, their rankings are determined as follows:

1. points obtained in the group matches between the teams concerned;
2. goal difference in the group matches between the teams concerned;
3. number of goals scored in the group matches between the teams concerned;
4. drawing of lots by the FIFA Organising Committee.

Key to colours in group tables
Group winners and runners-up advance to the Semi-finals
Third-placed teams play in the Fifth place match

All times are local: Nanjing in China Standard Time (UTC+8)

=== Group A ===
Team	Pld	W	D	L	GF	GA	GD	Pts
Venezuela	2	2	0	0	13	2	+11	6
Slovakia	2	1	0	1	6	6	0	3
Papua New Guinea	2	0	0	2	0	11	−11	0

14 August 2014
18:00

Papua New Guinea	0–7	Venezuela
	Report	Castellanos 19', 40', 49' (pen.), 69'; Hilary Vergara 47'; Nathalie Pasquel 61'; Greisbell Marquez 80+2'

Wutaishan Stadium, Nanjing
Attendance: 4,323
Referee: He Jin (China)

17 August 2014
18:00

Venezuela	6–2	Slovakia
Castellanos 10', 13', 33'; Nathalie Pasquel 45', 72'; Yuleisi Rivero 61'	Report	Šurnovská 40', 58'

Wutaishan Stadium, Nanjing
Attendance: 4,503
Referee: Christina Unkel (United States)

20 August 2014
18:00

Slovakia	4–0	Papua New Guinea
Laura Suchá 11'; Šurnovská 35', 54'; Veronika Jančová 68'	Report

Wutaishan Stadium, Nanjing
Attendance: 4,350
Referee: Gladys Lengwe (Zambia)

=== Group B ===
Team	Pld	W	D	L	GF	GA	GD	Pts
China	2	2	0	0	12	0	+12	6
Mexico	2	1	0	1	9	2	+7	3
Namibia	2	0	0	2	0	19	−19	0

14 August 2014
20:45

China	2–0	Mexico
Zhao Yujie 10'; Jin Kun 35'	Report

Wutaishan Stadium, Nanjing
Attendance: 4,323
Referee: Morag Pirie (Great Britain)

17 August 2014
20:45

Mexico	9–0	Namibia
Montserrat Hernandez 19', 59'; Daniela Garcia 21', 44'; Alejandra Zaragoza 30', 55', 76'; Cázares 72'; Maria Acedo 79'	Report

Wutaishan Stadium, Nanjing
Attendance: 4,503
Referee: Marilin Miranda (Paraguay)

20 August 2014
20:45

Namibia	0–10	China
	Report	Wan Wenting 9'; Zhang Jiayun 13', 62'; Ma Xiaolan 19', 24', 30', 45'; Jin Kun 43'; Wang Yanwen 54'; Fang Jie 66'

Wutaishan Stadium, Nanjing
Attendance: 4,350
Referee: Anna-Marie Keighley (New Zealand)

== Knockout stage ==
In the knockout stages, if a match is level at the end of normal playing time, the match is determined by a penalty shoot-out (no extra time is played).

=== Semi-finals ===
23 August 2014
18:00

Venezuela	1–1	Mexico
Argelis Campos 2'	Report	Cázares 8'
Penalties
Olimar Castillo (penalty scored); Nathalie Pasquel (penalty scored); Luzardo (penalty missed); Castellanos (penalty scored); Nayluisa Cáceres (penalty scored)	4–3	(penalty scored) Rodriguez; (penalty scored) Vanessa Gonzalez; (penalty scored) Marianna Maldonado; (penalty missed) Daniela Garcia; (penalty missed) Montserrat Hernandez

Wutaishan Stadium, Nanjing
Attendance: 4,690
Referee: Morag Pirie (Great Britain)

23 August 2014
20:45

China	0–0	Slovakia
	Report
Penalties
Zhao Yujie (penalty scored); Ma Xiaolan (penalty scored); Zhang Jiayun (penalty scored); Fang Jie (penalty scored)	4–2	(penalty missed) Šurnovská; (penalty missed) Tamara Gmitterová; (penalty scored) Mária Mikolajová; (penalty scored) Veronika Jančová

Wutaishan Stadium, Nanjing
Attendance: 4,690
Referee: Marilin Miranda (Paraguay)

=== Fifth place match ===
25 August 2014
20:45

Papua New Guinea	3–2	Namibia
Bellinda Giada 1', 29'; Marity Sep 34'	Report	Ignacia Haoses 16'; Ivone Kooper 40+1'

Jiangning Sports Center, Nanjing
Attendance: 8,102
Referee: He Jin (China)

=== Bronze medal match ===
26 August 2014
18:00

Mexico	3–1	Slovakia
Andrea Herbríková 10' (o.g.); Montserrat Hernandez 15'; Daniela Garcia 79'	Report	Diana Anguiano 43' (o.g.)

Wutaishan Stadium, Nanjing
Attendance: 11,678
Referee: Anna-Marie Keighley (New Zealand)

=== Gold medal match ===
26 August 2014
20:45

Venezuela	0–5	China
	Report	Wan Wenting 10'; Xie Qiwen 19'; Ma Xiaolan 34'; Zhang Jiayun 45'; Wu Xi 80+1'

Wutaishan Stadium, Nanjing
Attendance: 11,678
Referee: Gladys Lengwe (Zambia)

== Final ranking ==
Rank	Team
1st place, gold medalist(s)	China
2nd place, silver medalist(s)	Venezuela
3rd place, bronze medalist(s)	Mexico
4	Slovakia
5	Papua New Guinea
6	Namibia

== Goalscorers ==
7 goals

- (Venezuela) Deyna Castellanos

5 goals

- (China) Ma Xiaolan

4 goals

- (Slovakia) Martina Šurnovská

3 goals

- (China) Zhang Jiayun
- (Mexico) Daniela Garcia
- (Mexico) Montserrat Hernandez
- (Mexico) Alejandra Zaragoza
- (Venezuela) Nathalie Pasquel

2 goals

- (China) Jin Kun
- (China) Wan Wenting
- (Mexico) Dayana Cázares
- (Papua New Guinea) Bellinda Giada

1 goal

- (China) Fang Jie
- (China) Wang Yanwen
- (China) Wu Xi
- (China) Xie Qiwen
- (China) Zhao Yujie
- (Mexico) Maria Acedo
- (Namibia) Ignacia Haoses
- (Namibia) Ivone Kooper
- (Papua New Guinea) Marity Sep
- (Slovakia) Veronika Jančová
- (Slovakia) Laura Suchá
- (Venezuela) Argelis Campos
- (Venezuela) Greisbell Marquez
- (Venezuela) Yuleisi Rivero
- (Venezuela) Hilary Vergara

1 own goal

- (Mexico) Diana Anguiano (playing against Slovakia)
- (Slovakia) Andrea Herbríková (playing against Mexico)
