= Alexa Curiel =

Mexican footballer (born 2004)

Personal information
- Full name: Alexa Daniela Curiel Sánchez
- Date of birth: 14 April 2004 (age 22)
- Place of birth: Guadalajara, Jalisco, Mexico
- Height: 1.64 m (5 ft 5 in)
- Position: Attacking midfielder

Team information
- Current team: Tijuana
- Number: 16

Senior career*
Years	Team	Apps	(Gls)
2020–2024	Atlas	77	(3)
2025–	Tijuana	13	(0)

International career^{‡}
2023–	Mexico U-20		
- * Club domestic league appearances and goals as of 9 February 2026 ‡ National team caps and goals as of 12 March 2022

Alexa Daniela Curiel Sánchez (born 14 April 2004) is a Mexican professional footballer who plays as an attacking midfielder for Liga MX Femenil side Tijuana.

== Career ==
In 2020, she started her career in Atlas. In 2025, she joined to Tijuana.

== International career ==
Since 2023, Curiel has been part of the Mexico U-20 team.
