= Esmeralda Verdugo =

Mexican footballer (born 1994)

Personal information
- Full name: Esmeralda Verdugo Romo
- Date of birth: 19 January 1994 (age 32)
- Place of birth: Ensenada, Baja California, Mexico
- Height: 1.61 m (5 ft 3 in)
- Position: Attacking midfielder

College career
Years	Team	Apps	(Gls)
2014–2015	Cerritos Falcons	22	(14)

Senior career*
Years	Team	Apps	(Gls)
2017	Tijuana	3	(0)
2018–2020	América	51	(5)
2020	→ Tijuana (loan)	8	(1)
2020–2021	León	28	(1)
2021–2025	Tijuana	27	(1)

International career
2011–2012	Mexico U-17		
2013–2014	Mexico U-20		
2015	Mexico	1	(0)
- * Club domestic league appearances and goals as of 22 May 2021

Esmeralda Verdugo Romo (born 19 January 1994) is a former Mexican professional footballer who last played for Club Tijuana.

== Career ==
=== College ===
From 2014 to 2015, Verdugo played college soccer for Cerritos College, scoring 14 goals in 22 games.

=== Liga MX Femenil ===
Verdugo joined Club América from Club Tijuana in 2018. She made her debut in a 2–1 defeat to Toluca. In December 2019, Verdugo and her teammate Lucero Cuevas were victims of an express kidnapping. She subsequently rejoined Club Tijuana on loan.

Verdugo signed with Club León in June 2020. In June 2021, she rejoined Club Tijuana for a third time.

=== International career ===
Verdugo was capped for the Mexico women's national football team at the 2015 International Women's Football Tournament of Natal.
