= Dalia Molina =

Mexican footballer (born 1999)

Personal information
- Full name: Dalia Isabel Molina Chuela
- Date of birth: 9 October 1999 (age 27)
- Place of birth: Uruapan, Michoacán, Mexico
- Height: 1.57 m (5 ft 2 in)
- Position: Winger

Senior career*
Years	Team	Apps	(Gls)
2017–2020	Morelia	83	(22)
2020–2021	América	25	(2)
2021–2025	Cruz Azul	114	(14)
2025–2026	Querétaro	23	(1)
- * Club domestic league appearances and goals as of 5 February 2026 ‡ National team caps and goals as of 12 March 2022

Dalia Isabel Molina Chuela (born 9 October 1999) is a Mexican professional footballer who plays as a Winger for Liga MX Femenil club Querétaro.

== Career ==
In 2017, she started her career in Morelia. In 2020, she was transferred to América. In 2021, she joined to Cruz Azul.
