= Lía Morán =

Mexican footballer (born 2002)

Personal information
- Full name: Lía Betsabé Morán Torres
- Date of birth: 11 August 2002 (age 24)
- Place of birth: Guadalajara, Jalisco, Mexico
- Height: 1.57 m (5 ft 2 in)
- Position: Winger

Team information
- Current team: Tijuana
- Number: 21

Senior career*
Years	Team	Apps	(Gls)
2017	Guadalajara	0	(0)
2019–2022	Puebla	89	(1)
2022–2026	Querétaro	130	(10)
2026–	Tijuana	0	(0)
- * Club domestic league appearances and goals as of 5 February 2026 ‡ National team caps and goals as of 12 March 2022

Lía Betsabé Morán Torres (born 8 November 2002) is a Mexican professional footballer who plays as a forward for Liga MX Femenil side Querétaro.

In 2017, she started her career in Guadalajara. In 2019, she was transferred to Puebla. Since 2022, she is part of Querétaro.
