= Diana Fierro =

Mexican football midfielder (born 1995)

Personal information
- Full name: Diana Izbeth Fierro Delgado
- Date of birth: June 19, 1995 (age 31)
- Place of birth: Cuernavaca, Morelos, Mexico
- Height: 1.59 m (5 ft 2 1/2 in)
- Position: Midfielder

Senior career*
Years	Team	Apps	(Gls)
2017–2018	América	24	(2)
2019–2022	Pachuca	52	(7)
2024	Mazatlán	11	(0)
- * Club domestic league appearances and goals as of 11 November 2017

Diana Izbeth Fierro Delgado (born 19 June 1995) is a Mexican professional football midfielder.

== See also ==
- List of people from Morelos
