= Patricia Gutiérrez (footballer) =

Mexican footballer (born 1995)

Personal information
- Full name: Patricia Ameyalli Gutiérrez Velazco
- Date of birth: 26 October 1995 (age 31)
- Place of birth: Tijuana, Baja California, Mexico
- Height: 1.62 m (5 ft 4 in)
- Positions: Center-back; defensive midfielder

Senior career*
Years	Team	Apps	(Gls)
2017–2021	Tijuana	67	(3)
- * Club domestic league appearances and goals as of 18 October 2017

Patricia Ameyalli Gutiérrez Velazco (born 26 October 1995) is a former Mexican professional football midfielder who last played for Tijuana of the Liga MX Femenil.
