= Ammanda Marroquín =

Mexican footballer (born 2003)

Personal information
- Full name: Ammanda Mariee Marroquín
- Date of birth: 3 April 2003 (age 23)
- Place of birth: California, United States
- Height: 1.67 m (5 ft 6 in)
- Position: Defensive midfielder

Team information
- Current team: Tijuana
- Number: 8

College career
Years	Team	Apps	(Gls)
2021	Washington State Cougars	5	(0)

Senior career*
Years	Team	Apps	(Gls)
2022–2023	UANL	5	(0)
2023–	Tijuana	74	(4)

International career^{‡}
2021–2022	Mexico U-20		
- * Club domestic league appearances and goals as of 9 February 2026 ‡ National team caps and goals as of 29 February 2024

Ammanda Mariee Marroquín (born 3 April 2003) is a professional footballer who plays as a Defensive midfielder for Liga MX Femenil side Tijuana. Born and raised in the United States, she represents Mexico internationally.

== Career ==
In 2022, she started her career in UANL. In 2023, she was transferred to Tijuana.

== International career ==
Marroquin was part of the squad of Mexico U-20 women's national football team that finished as Runners-up at the 2022 CONCACAF Women's U-20 Championship.
