= Rebeca Zavaleta =

Mexican footballer (born 2000)

Personal information
- Full name: Rebeca Zavaleta Aparicio
- Date of birth: 17 January 2000 (age 26)
- Place of birth: Ecatepec de Morelos, State of Mexico, Mexico
- Height: 1.62 m (5 ft 4 in)
- Position: Left back

Senior career*
Years	Team	Apps	(Gls)
2017–2019	Cruz Azul	53	(0)
2019–2023	UNAM	84	(2)
2023–2024	Toluca	12	(0)
2024–2025	Huracán		
2025–2026	Mazatlán	11	(0)
- * Club domestic league appearances and goals as of 9 February 2026

Rebeca Zavaleta Aparicio (born 17 January 2000) is a Mexican professional footballer who plays as an Left back.

== Career ==
In 2017, she started her career in Cruz Azul. In 2019, she was transferred to UNAM. In 2023, she joined to Toluca. In 2024, she spent one season with Huracán. In 2025, she return to Liga MX Femenil with Mazatlán.
