= Andrea Rodebaugh =

Mexican footballer and manager (born 1966)

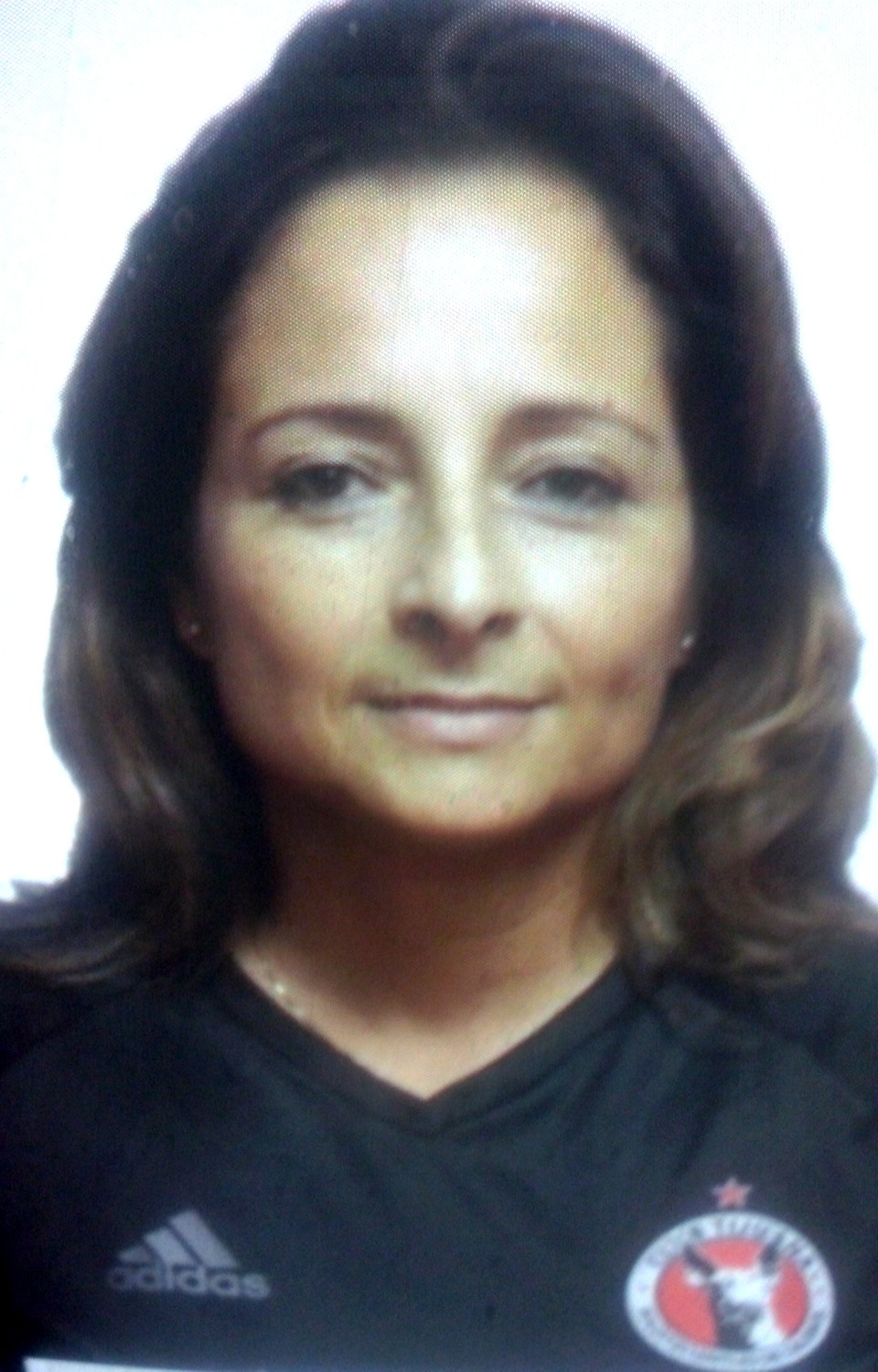
- Rodebaugh in 2018

Personal information
- Full name: Andrea Rodebaugh Huitrón
- Date of birth: 8 October 1966 (age 60)
- Place of birth: Mexico City, Mexico
- Height: 1.60 m (5 ft 3 in)
- Position: Midfielder

College career
| Years | Team | Apps | (Gls) |
| 1984–1988 | California Golden Bears | | (25) |

Senior career*
| Years | Team | Apps | (Gls) |
| 1989–1990 | JFS Poissy | | |
| 1993–1996 | Tokyo Shidax LSC | | |

International career
| 1994–1999 | Mexico | 3 | (0) |

Managerial career
- 2008: Mexico U20
- 2016–2018: Tijuana (women)
- * Club domestic league appearances and goals

Andrea Rodebaugh Huitrón (born 8 October 1966) is a Mexican professional football coach and former player who is the current manager of Tijuana in the Liga MX Femenil.

== Life ==
Rodebaugh was born in 1966 in Mexico City.

She played as a midfielder and have played for teams in the United States, France and Japan. Perhaps the best Mexican female footballer of the 1990s, she was the captain of the Mexico women's national football team during that decade, leading the team at the 1999 FIFA Women's World Cup.

In 2017 she was confirmed as the lead for the Tijuana women's team. This announcement removed Marbella Ibarra who had been credited with creating the team.

Andrea has 2 kids, Anahi and Diego Sandoval.
