= Wutaishan Stadium =

Stadium in Nanjing, China

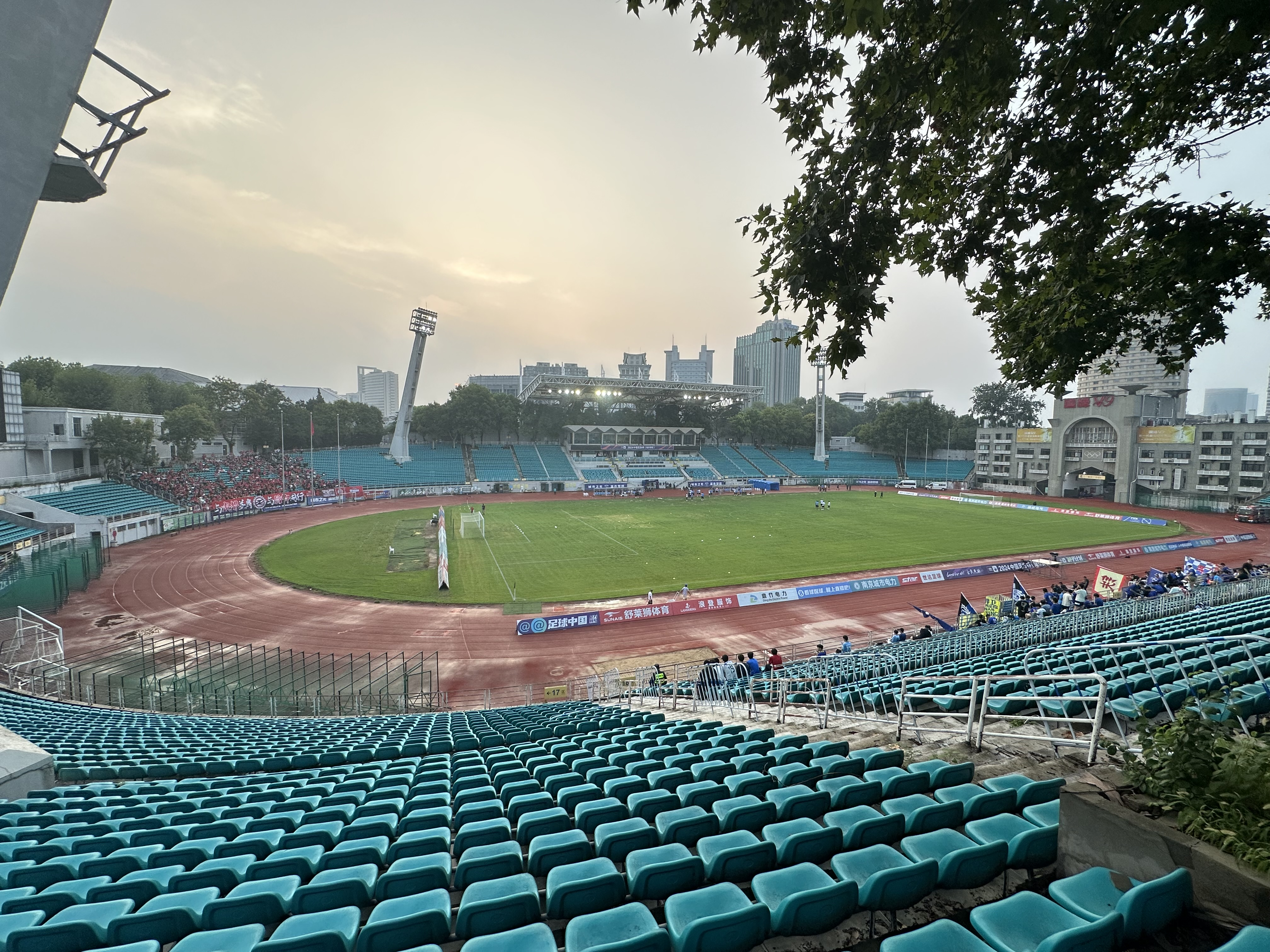
- Interactive map of Wutaishan Stadium
- Location: Nanjing, Jiangsu, China
- Coordinates: 32°03′03″N 118°46′07″E
- Capacity: 22,000

Tenants
- Nanking FC; Jiangsu; Nanjing City (2024–present)

Wutaishan Stadium (Simplified Chinese: 五台山体育场) is a multi-purpose stadium in Wutaishan Sports Center (Simplified Chinese: 五台山体育中心), Nanjing, China. It is currently used mostly for football matches, as home ground of Nanjing City since 2024 and formerly for Jiangsu Ladies. The stadium has a capacity for 22,000 people.

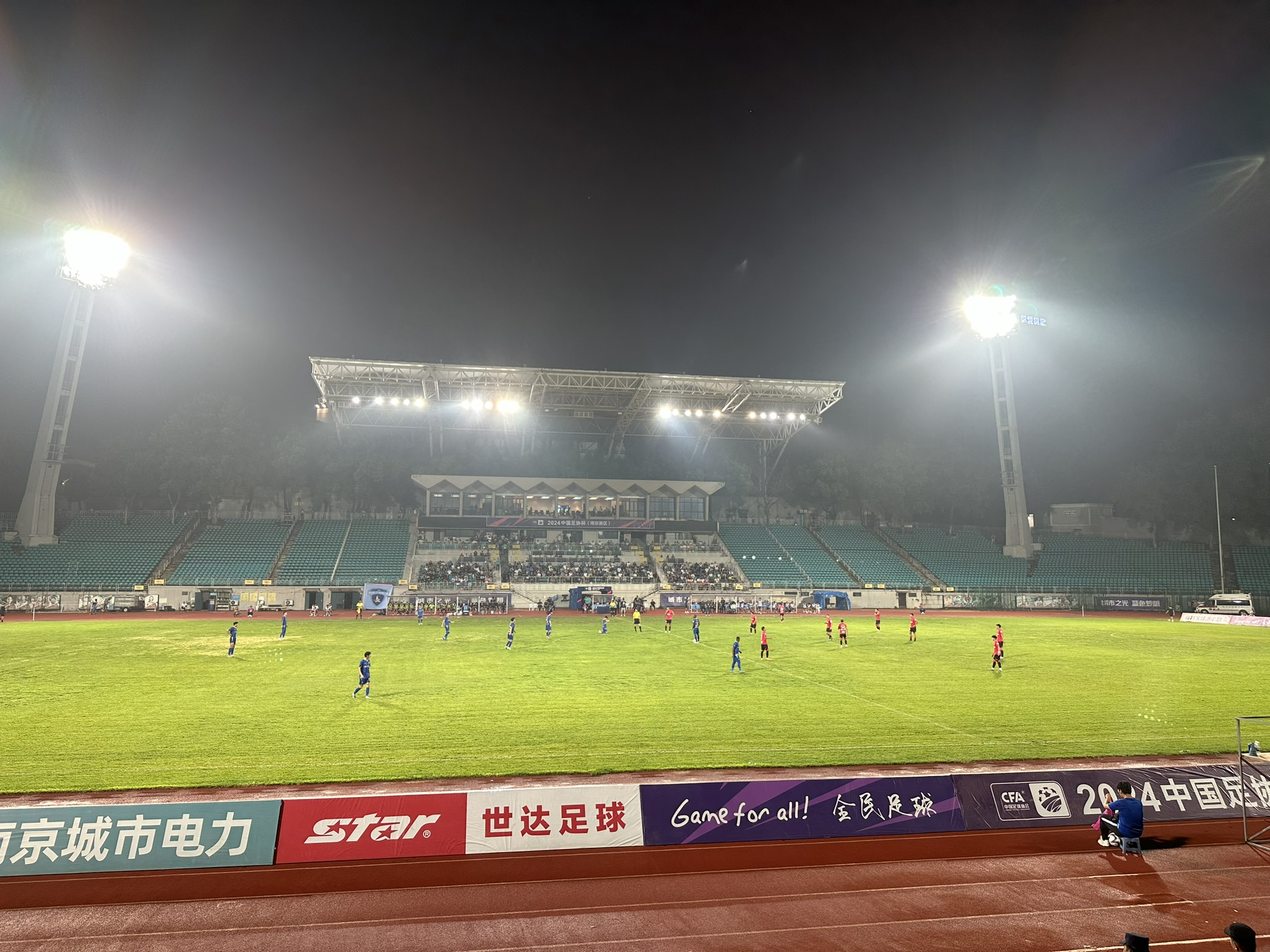
Wutaishan Stadium in 2024
