= Ximena Ríos =

Mexican footballer (born 2001)

Ximena Rios
Personal information
- Full name: Ximena Elizabeth Rios Zarate
- Date of birth: 26 July 2001 (age 25)
- Place of birth: Tuxtla Gutiérrez, Chiapas, Mexico
- Height: 1.60 m (5 ft 3 in)
- Position: Left-back

Team information
- Current team: UNAM
- Number: 9

Senior career*
Years	Team	Apps	(Gls)
2017–2021	Club América	76	(2)
2022	Querétaro	29	(2)
2023–2024	Cruz Azul	51	(10)
2025–	UNAM	39	(5)

International career
2017–2018	Mexico U17		
2019–2020	Mexico U20		
- * Club domestic league appearances and goals as of 31 January 2026

Ximena Elizabeth Rios Zarate (born 26 July 2001) is a Mexican professional footballer who plays as a left-back for Liga MX Femenil club Pumas UNAM.

== Club career ==
=== Club América Femenil ===
A native of Tuxtla Gutiérrez, Ríos began playing for Club América Femenil's senior side in the Apertura 2017 tournament, making her debut against Club Tijuana in July 2017. Manager Leonardo Cuéllar integrated her into the first team during the Apertura 2018 tournament, as América would finish as champions. Ríos was included in the Liga MX ideal eleven for the second round of the Clausura 2020 tournament.

== International career ==
On June 12, 2018, Mexico women's national under-17 football team finished as Runners-up at the 2018 CONCACAF Women's U-17 Championship.

On December 1, 2018, Mexico women's national under-17 football team finished as Runners-up at the 2018 FIFA U-17 Women's World Cup.

On March 8, 2020, Mexico women's national under-20 football team finished as Runners-up at the 2020 CONCACAF Women's U-20 Championship.

== Honours ==
Club América

- Liga MX Femenil: Champions: Apertura 2018

Mexico U17

- CONCACAF Women's U-17 Championship: Runners-up: 2018
- FIFA U-17 Women's World Cup: Runners-up: 2018

Mexico U20

- CONCACAF Women's U-20 Championship: Runners-up: 2020
