= Emili Bautista =

Mexican footballer (born 2003)

Personal information
- Full name: Emili Bautista Galván
- Date of birth: 9 April 2003 (age 23)
- Place of birth: Ciudad Juárez, Chihuahua, Mexico
- Height: 1.63 m (5 ft 4 in)
- Position: Right back

Team information
- Current team: Tijuana
- Number: 22

Senior career*
Years	Team	Apps	(Gls)
2018–2019	Necaxa	31	(0)
2020–2024	Juárez	105	(0)
2025–	Tijuana	9	(0)

International career^{‡}
2022	Mexico U-20		
- * Club domestic league appearances and goals as of 9 February 2026 ‡ National team caps and goals as of 14 July 2023

Emili Bautista Galván (born 9 April 2003) is a Mexican professional footballer who plays as a Right back for Liga MX Femenil side Tijuana.

== Career ==
Bautista started her career in 2018 with Necaxa. In 2020 she joined Juárez.

== International career ==
Bautista was part of the squad of Mexico U-20 women's national football team that finished as Runners-up at the 2022 CONCACAF Women's U-20 Championship.
