= Marbella Ibarra =

Mexican footballer and lawyer (1972–2018)

- Born: 1972; Acapulco de Juárez Municipality
- Died: 2018 (aged 45–46) poss. Rosarito
- Cause of death: murder
- Occupation: lawyer
- Known for: advocate for Women's football in Mexico

Marbella Ibarra (1972 – 2018) was a Mexican advocate for Women's association football who was trained as a lawyer. She created the first professional women's football team in Mexico. She was murdered in 2018.

== Life ==
Ibarra was born in Acapulco de Juárez Municipality. She was trained as a lawyer, but after university she stayed on as a coach.

She became known as an advocate for women's football in Mexico. She played a bit of football and basketball for fun but as a coach she formed an amateur women's team named Isamar FC.

She was enthusiastic about football and she interceded with Xolos of Tijuana to persuade them create a women's team in 2014. She was their coach and they had a problem as they were the only professional team in Mexico. The team had to travel to the US to find similar clubs and Ibarra would subsidise their travel costs from her own beauty business. It was her ambition to create a league in Mexico and three years later the Liga MX Femenil was formed.

In 2017 Andrea Rodebaugh was confirmed as the lead for the Tijuana women's team. This announcement thanked, but removed Ibarra who had been credited with creating the team.

She was a scout for talent and she devoted time to trying to create financial support for promising women footballers so that they trial with different teams. She was credited with founding Mexico's national women football team.

In 2018 her body was found wrapped in plastic in Rosarito. There was signs of torture. She had been missing since September and her death was not thought to have links to her work in sport. Her body was found in October and she is thought to have died several days before. Her hands and legs were bound.

Her body highlighted the number of women who are murdered in Mexico. A bound and tortured body is not unique and it was thought that the death was intended to send some kind of message.
