= Zulma Hernández =

Mexican footballer

Personal information
- Full name: Zulma Yared Hernández García
- Date of birth: 9 September 1995 (age 31)
- Place of birth: Mexico City, Mexico
- Height: 1.65 m (5 ft 5 in)
- Position: Defensive midfielder

Team information
- Current team: UNAM U-19 (women) (Assistant)

Senior career*
Years	Team	Apps	(Gls)
2017–2021	América	82	(0)
2021–2023	Toluca	55	(0)
2024	Mazatlán	24	(1)

International career^{‡}
2019	Mexico	1	(0)

Managerial career
- 2026–: UNAM U-19 (women) (Assistant)
- * Club domestic league appearances and goals as of 24 April 2023 ‡ National team caps and goals as of 5 April 2019

Zulma Yared Hernández García (born 2 August 1998) is a former Mexican footballer who last played as a midfielder for Liga MX Femenil side Mazatlán and the Mexico women's national team.

== International career ==
Hernández made her senior debut for Mexico on 5 April 2019 in a 0–2 friendly loss to the Netherlands.

== Honours ==
Club América

- Liga MX Femenil: Apertura 2018
