= Lucero Cuevas =

Mexican footballer (born 1996)

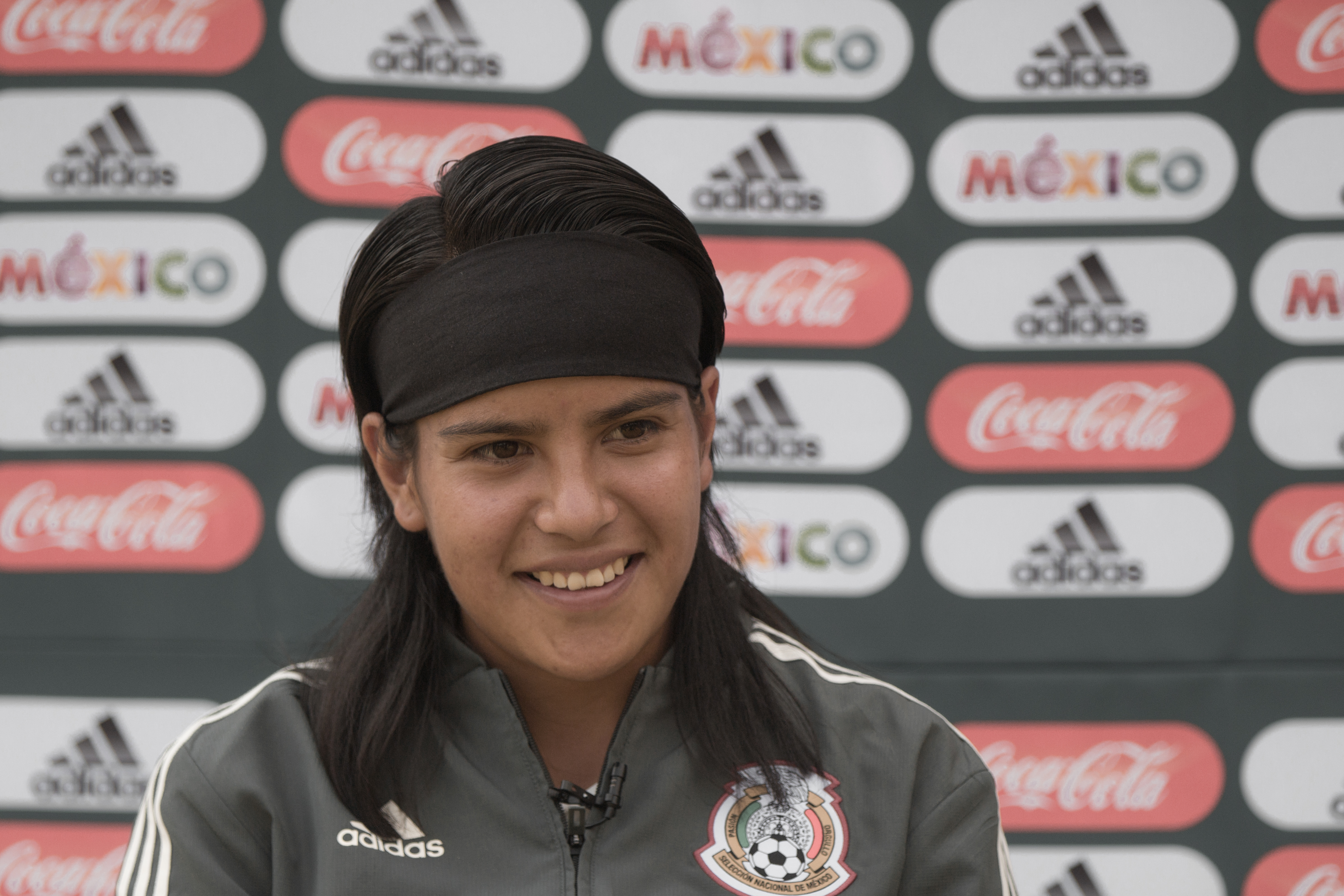
- Lucero Cuevas in 2018

Personal information
- Full name: Lucero Ximena Cuevas Flores
- Date of birth: 22 January 1996 (age 30)
- Place of birth: Cuernavaca, Morelos, Mexico
- Height: 1.61 m (5 ft 3 1/2 in)
- Position: Attacking midfielder

Youth career
- Ballenas Galeana
- Leonas Morelos

Senior career*
Years	Team	Apps	(Gls)
2017–2020	América	69	(44)
2020	→ Tijuana (loan)	7	(3)
2020–2021	León	28	(6)
2021–2022	Pachuca	21	(3)
2022–2023	León	29	(3)

International career^{‡}
2017	Mexico	1	(0)
- * Club domestic league appearances and goals as of 21 July 2021 ‡ National team caps and goals as of 27 November 2017

Lucero Ximena Cuevas Flores (born 22 January 1996) is a Mexican footballer who last played as a striker for Liga MX Femenil club León.

== Club career ==
Prior to turning professional, Cuevas played in the amateur Liga Mexicana de Fútbol Femenil with Ballenas Galeana and Leonas Morelos.

=== América ===
On 29 July 2017, Cuevas made her debut for Club América against Club Tijuana, scoring the winning goal in the 19th minute. On 4 August, Cuevas scored the first hat-trick in Liga MX Femenil history in a 5–0 win over Cruz Azul. She ended the 2017 Apertura as top goalscorer, netting 15 times in 14 games. She repeated the feat in the 2018 Clausura, again scoring 15 goals.

=== Tijuana ===
In December 2019, Cuevas and her América teammate Esmeralda Verdugo were the victims of an express kidnapping. The following month, she joined Club Tijuana on loan.

=== León ===
In August 2020, Cuevas joined Club León ahead of the 2020–21 season. She departed León at the end of that season.

=== Pachuca ===
In June 2021, Cuevas signed with C.F. Pachuca.

== International career ==
On 15 November 2017 Cuevas received her first call-up with the Mexico national team, On November 27 she made her debut with the national team coming in as a substitute for Charlyn Corral at minute 79' in a game that ended with a favorable score of 0–2 against Costa Rica in a match held in the Alejandro Morera Soto Stadium.

== Career statistics ==
=== Club ===
As of 23 April 2018.

Club statistics
Club	Season	League (Note: Includes Liguilla)			National Cup		Continental		Total	
Club	Season	Division	Apps	Goals	Apps	Goals	Apps	Goals	Apps	Goals
América	2017–18	Liga MX Femenil	32	31	3	1	—		35	32
América	Total		32	31	3	1	0	0	35	32
Career total			32	31	3	1	0	0	35	32

== Honours and achievements ==
Individual

- Liga MX Femenil top scorer: Apertura 2017
- Liga MX Femenil Team of The Season: Apertura 2017
- Liga MX Femenil top scorer: Clausura 2018
- Liga MX Femenil Team of The Season: Clausura 2018

== See also ==
- List of people from Morelos
