= Casandra Cuevas =

Mexican footballer (born 1997)

Personal information
- Full name: Betzy Casandra Cuevas Araujo
- Date of birth: 21 April 1997 (age 29)
- Place of birth: Azcapotzalco, Mexico City, Mexico
- Height: 1.59 m (5 ft 3 in)
- Position: Midfielder

Team information
- Current team: Toluca
- Number: 10

Senior career*
Years	Team	Apps	(Gls)
2017–2024	América	237	(50)
2019	→ Tijuana (loan)	18	(5)
2025–	Toluca	30	(1)

International career^{‡}
2013	Mexico U-17		
2024–	Mexico	1	(0)
- * Club domestic league appearances and goals as of 31 January 2026 ‡ National team caps and goals as of 17 December 2024

Betzy Casandra Cuevas Araujo (born 21 April 1997), known as Casandra "Cas" Cuevas or Betzy Cuevas, is a Mexican professional footballer who plays as a midfielder for Liga MX Femenil side Toluca and the Mexico women's national football team. Cuevas is one of the players with the most match appearances in Liga MX Femenil, and the player with the most match appearances for Club América.

== Club career ==
=== Club América (2017–2024) ===
Cuevas started her professional career with Club América in 2017, being part of the squad of América Femenil that participated in the first official tournament for the club, the 2017 Copa MX Femenil. Cuevas was a key player for América during the first seasons of the team, and was vital to obtain the first Liga MX Femenil title for the club during the Apertura 2018 tournament, in which she scored 10 goals including one on the first leg of the final.

After nearly eight years at the club, 237 league appearances and two league championships, Cuevas decided to part ways with América on 17 December 2024. She was the last remaining player at the club that was part of the América squad that participated in the initial Liga MX Femenil tournament back in 2017.

==== 2019: Loan to Club Tijuana ====
Cuevas joined Tijuana on loan ahead of the Apertura 2019 tournament. On her first and only tournament at Tijuana, Cuevas made 18 appearances and scored 5 goals, helping the team reach the playoffs for the first time.

Cuevas returned to América from the loan at Tijuana ahead of the Clausura 2020 tournament.

=== Toluca (2025-present) ===
On 17 December 2024, Toluca announced that Cuevas will be joining the club ahead of the Apertura 2025 tournament.

== International career ==
Cuevas had previously participated with the Mexico U-17 national team at the 2013 CONCACAF Women's U-17 Championship. She was called to the senior Mexico women's national football team on 27 May 2024 for two friendly matches against Canada. Cuevas made her debut with Mexico on 4 June 2024, coming into the pitch as a sub during the second match against Canada.

== Honours ==
Club América

- Liga MX Femenil: Apertura 2018, Clausura 2023
