= Marylin Díaz =

Mexican footballer (born 1991)

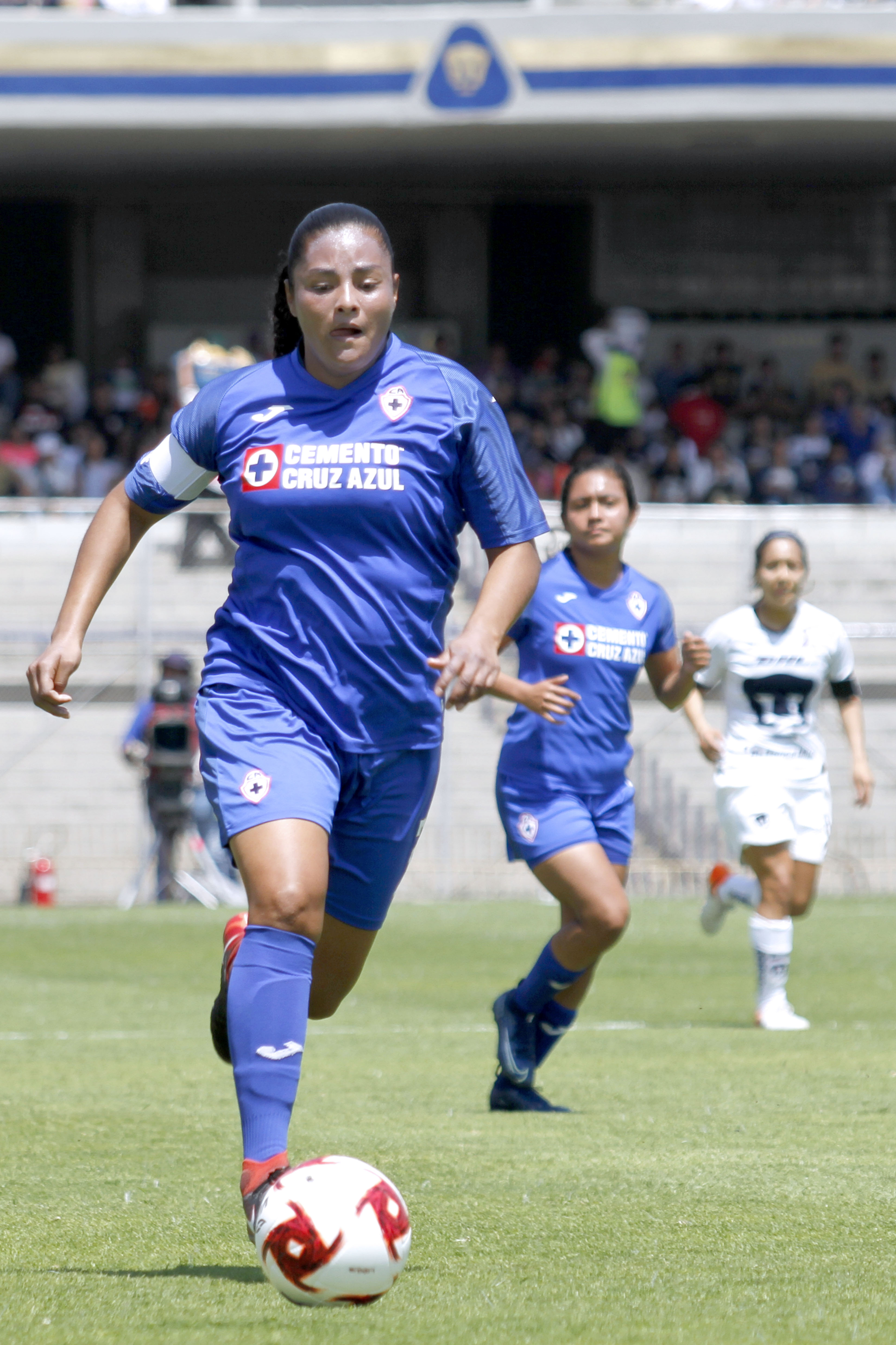
- Díaz in 2020

Personal information
- Full name: Marylin Viridiana Díaz Ramírez
- Date of birth: 18 November 1991 (age 34)
- Place of birth: Iztapalapa, Mexico City, Mexico
- Height: 1.72 m (5 ft 7 1/2 in)
- Position: Defensive midfielder

Senior career*
Years	Team	Apps	(Gls)
2011	UE L'Estartit		
2012–2016	Real Celeste		
2017–2019	América	52	(8)
2020	Cruz Azul	27	(3)
2021–2024	UNAM	104	(16)

International career
2010	Mexico U-20		
2010	Mexico		
- * Club domestic league appearances and goals as of 9 April 2018

Marylin Viridiana Díaz Ramírez (born November 18, 1991) is a Mexican footballer who last played as a defender for UNAM in Mexico. She played for the Mexico women's national team.

== Playing career ==
=== Club ===
==== UE L'Estartit ====
In early January 2011, Díaz joined then-Superliga team UE L'Estartit as a winter transfer. She was there only six months.

==== FC Kansas City (NWSL) ====
In January 2013, Diaz was included in a list of 55 players from the U.S., Canada, and Mexico national teams that were allocated to the eight teams in the new National Women's Soccer League. As part of the NWSL Player Allocation, she was allocated to FC Kansas City. In March 2013, the Mexican federation informed the club that Diaz would not be joining the team.

==== Real Celeste ====
As of January 2015, she was playing for Real Celeste in Mexican women's national league.
