= Nanking F.C. =

Nanjing Football Club
- Full name: Nanjing Football Club
- Nickname: "The Star of Nanjing"
- Short name: NFC
- Founded: 1 January 1930; 96 years ago
- Ground: Nanjing, China, Nanjing University of Aeronautics and Astronautics Principal
- Manager: Merim Brkić

Nanking Football Club (simplified Chinese: 南京足球俱乐部; traditional Chinese: 南京足球俱樂部; Mandarin Pinyin: Nánjīng Zúqiú Jùlèbù) is a defunct amateur Chinese football club that predominantly competed in the former capital of China Nanjing (currently the capital of Jiangsu in eastern China) from 1930 until 1937–1938. The name was reused in 2016 by Merim Brkić who started the new Nanjing F.C. and adopted the same values as the original club. It has been frequently referred as Nanjing Football Club after the pinyin language reform, when Nanjing was gradually adopted as the standard spelling of the city's name in most languages that use the Roman alphabet.

== History ==
The club was founded in early 1930 by David Crow, a silk trader from Manchester, England, employed by Jardine, Matheson & Co. Ltd one of the largest trading companies in the Far East at that time. As an attempt to integrate foreigners and Chinese nationals during the period known as the Nanking decade, Nanjing Football Club was the first sports team in China to include both Chinese nationals and foreigners playing side by side as equals.

Its first batch of athletes included nationals from France, Italy, Korea, Peru, Portugal and the United Kingdom, as wells as citizens from Nanjing, Beijing, Chungking (Chongqing), Hangzhou, Shanghai, and Suzhou. According to veteran sports journalist and writer Liu Zhongxian, born in Nanjing, the team was "wildly popular due to the several nationalities of its players" but would only punctuate "as average quality". Three of its most renowned footballers – Wang Xiaochuan, Li Huitang and Ping Li – had also been defending the colors of the China National Team, founded in 1924, when the country joined Fédération Internationale de Football Association (FIFA) in 1932.

Nanjing Football Club did not own its headquarters, but its meeting point and training field was located in the vicinity of the Nanjing Botanical Garden, Memorial Sun Yat-Sen (Chinese: 南京中山植物园; pinyin: Nánjīng Zhōngshān Zhíwùyúan), the first botanical garden in China. The club would disband shortly after the beginning of the Second Sino-Japanese War when Japan invaded China. The Japanese troops occupied Nanjing in December 1937 and carried out the brutal Nanking massacre, that left very little documentation of the club's history.

=== Crest and kit ===
A lone white star was adopted as the club's badge. Since its first match on 6 June 1930, the club colours were black and white stripes, inspired by traditional English team Notts County, the oldest football team in the world to currently play at a professional level.[3] The club did not have one specific colour for shorts, that could be either black or white.

== New era ==
In October 2016 the name Nanjing F.C name was brought back to life following the original traditions of bringing together foreigners from more than 20 countries and Chinese as equals. In the first season they managed win the 2017 scarlet cup, the 2017 BSN cup and come runners up in the Nanjing city league (8 a-side).
