= Ana Lozada =

Mexican footballer (born 1997)

Personal information
- Full name: Ana Gabriela Lozada Salas
- Date of birth: 22 July 1997 (age 29)
- Place of birth: Benito Juárez, Mexico City, Mexico
- Height: 1.70 m (5 ft 7 in)
- Position: Centre-back

Team information
- Current team: León
- Number: 4

Senior career*
Years	Team	Apps	(Gls)
2017–2021	América	115	(2)
2022–2023	Cruz Azul	48	(5)
2023–2025	Juárez	59	(2)
2025–	León	9	(1)

International career^{‡}
2020–	Mexico	1	(0)
- * Club domestic league appearances and goals as of 9 February 2026 ‡ National team caps and goals as of 11 March 2020

Ana Gabriela Lozada Salas (born 22 July 1997) is a Mexican footballer who plays as a centre back for Liga MX Femenil side León and the Mexico women's national team.

== International career ==
Lozada made her senior debut for Mexico on 11 March 2020 in a 0–0 friendly draw against the Czech Republic.
