= Edna Santamaría =

Mexican footballer (born 1992)

Personal information
- Full name: Edna Fabiola Santamaria Orduña
- Date of birth: 2 June 1992 (age 34)
- Place of birth: Azcapotzalco, Mexico City, Mexico
- Height: 1.54 m (5 ft 1 in)
- Position: Forward

Senior career*
Years	Team	Apps	(Gls)
2017–2018	América	25	(3)
2018–2022	UNAM	104	(25)
2022–2026	Querétaro	118	(22)
- * Club domestic league appearances and goals as of 5 February 2026 ‡ National team caps and goals as of 12 March 2022

Edna Fabiola Santamaria Orduña (born 2 June 1992) is a Mexican professional footballer who plays as a Forward for Liga MX Femenil side Querétaro.

In 2017, she started her career in América. In 2018, she was transferred to UNAM. Since 2022, she is part of Querétaro.
