= Cecilia Santiago =

Mexican footballer (born 1994)

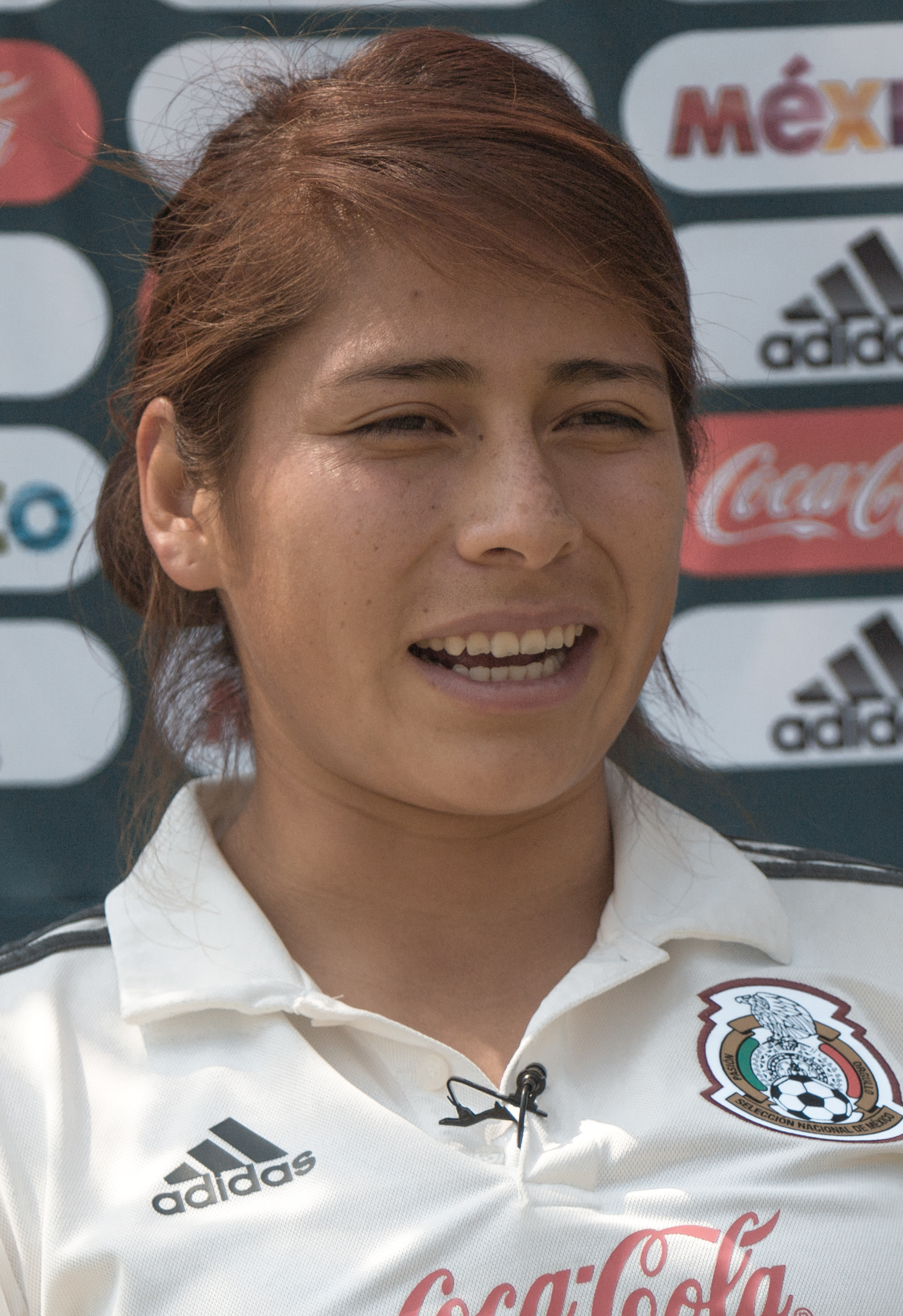
- Santiago in 2016

Personal information
- Full name: Aurora Cecilia Santiago Cisneros
- Date of birth: 19 October 1994 (age 32)
- Place of birth: La Paz, State of Mexico, Mexico
- Height: 1.75 m (5 ft 9 in)
- Position: Goalkeeper

Team information
- Current team: UANL
- Number: 1

Senior career*
Years	Team	Apps	(Gls)
2010–2013	Santos Laguna		
2013	Boston Breakers	3	(0)
2014	Kansas City	0	(0)
2015	Apollon Limassol		
2016	Þór Akureyri	18	(0)
2017–2019	América	39	(0)
2019–2021	PSV	5	(0)
2021–	UANL	106	(0)

International career^{‡}
2008–2010	Mexico U17		
2008–2014	Mexico U20		
2010–	Mexico	66	(0)
- * Club domestic league appearances and goals as of 2 September 2025 ‡ National team caps and goals as of 09:20, 18 June 2015 (UTC)

Aurora Cecilia Santiago Cisneros (born 19 October 1994) is a Mexican professional footballer who plays as a goalkeeper for Tigres UANL (women) and the Mexico women's national team. By playing in the 2011 FIFA Women's World Cup in Germany at the age of 16 years and 251 days, she became the youngest-ever goalkeeper to appear in a World Cup.

== Playing career ==
=== Club ===
Santiago was born in Los Reyes la Paz, part of the Greater Mexico City area. She started playing for the women's team of Club Santos Laguna in the Super Liga Femenil de Fútbol in October 2010. In 2013, she signed for the Boston Breakers in the National Women's Soccer League. In February 2016, Santiago signed for Icelandic top division team Þór Akureyri.

=== International ===
Having played twice in the group stages of the 2010 CONCACAF Women's Gold Cup, which acted as the qualifying state for the 2011 World Cup for CONCACAF nations, Santiago made her World Cup debut on 27 June 2011 at the age of 16 as Mexico played England at the Volkswagen Arena in Wolfsburg, becoming the youngest goalkeeper ever to appear in a men's or women's international tournament. The game ended in a 1–1 draw, Mexico's first ever point at a World Cup.

The year before she had been the youngest player at the July 2010 U20 Women's World Cup (also played in Germany), when she played for Mexico women's national under-20 football team at the age of 15 years and nine months. Expected to go out in the first stage, the team reached the quarter finals, with Santiago's performances considered a vital factor in the team's surprising success in getting through the group stage. Earlier in the year, she had been part of the Mexico U17 team that reached the final of the CONCACAF U17 Championships in March, losing 1–0 to Canada.

Two years previously, she had been the youngest player at the 2008 U20 World Cup in Chile, featuring in the Mexico squad less than two months after her fourteenth birthday.

=== Personal life ===
Santiago was originally a defender but switched at the age of six despite opposition from her dad. She is the only player to be part of a squad for four FIFA U-20 Women's World Cup, and has played in three of those tournaments 2010, 2012, and 2014.

== Honours ==
Tigres UANL

- Liga MX Femenil: Apertura 2025
