= Karen Díaz =

Mexican footballer (born 1998)

Personal information
- Full name: Karen Alejandra Díaz Sánchez
- Date of birth: 2 August 1998 (age 28)
- Place of birth: Bocoyna, Chihuahua, Mexico
- Height: 1.67 m (5 ft 5 1/2 in)
- Position: Right back

Team information
- Current team: Tijuana
- Number: 2

Senior career*
Years	Team	Apps	(Gls)
2017–2023	Pachuca	88	(7)
2024	León	6	(0)
2024–	Tijuana	40	(3)

International career^{‡}
2018	Mexico U20	0	(0)
2019–	Mexico	1	(0)
- * Club domestic league appearances and goals as of 9 February 2026 ‡ National team caps and goals as of 5 April 2019

Karen Alejandra Díaz Sánchez (born 2 August 1998) is a Mexican footballer who plays as a centre-back for Liga MX Femenil club León and the Mexico women's national team.

== International career ==
Díaz was a member of the Mexican squad at the 2018 FIFA U-20 Women's World Cup, but she did not play. She made her senior debut on 5 April 2019 in a 0-2 friendly loss to the Netherlands.
