= Liga Mexicana de Fútbol Femenil =

- Organising body: LIMEFFE
- Founded: 2007
- Country: Mexico
- Confederation: CONCACAF
- Divisions: 3
- Number of clubs: 76
- Current champions: Selección Femenil Puebla (1st title) (Clausura 2017)
- Most championships: Morelia, Rio Soccer (4 titles)
- Broadcaster(s): AYM Sports
- Current: 2017–18 LIMEFFE season

The Liga Mexicana de Fútbol Femenil is a women's football league in Mexico organized by LIMEFFE. Formally known as the Superliga Femenil, this league was established in 2007 as an attempt to help and grow women's football in Mexico. It was considered until 2017 as the highest division of women's football in the country.

Even though the league had the support of the Mexican Football Federation as well as the support of some Liga MX clubs such as Chivas, the league struggled to attract sponsors, fans, and media attention from its beginning. In 2016, the Liga MX Femenil was created with the full backing of all Liga MX clubs and the Mexican Football Federation to professionalize and grow women's football in Mexico. The two leagues are not connected by the league system, but the Liga Mexicana de Fútbol Femenil has lost its top division status since the introduction of Liga MX Femenil.

== Competition format ==
The league is played in the Apertura and Clausura format, meaning two seasons are played each year - in the year's first half the Clausura and in the later half the Apertura. The league is divided into two groups, in 2016 for example there were 15 teams in each group. After the regular season, playoffs will be played between the best placed teams in each group. Four or eight teams advanced from each group in the past years. As of the 2016 Apertura eight teams advance from each group.

The play-offs, including the final are played in two-legs. Also in the final there is no away goals rule applied and games tied on goals will go into extra-time.

== History ==
On 28 September 2007, the Super Liga Femenil started with two games: América versus Guadalajara and Universidad de Guadalajara versus UNAM.

== Teams ==
=== SuperLiga Zona Centro ===
Group I
- Centellas
- Forza Cuernavaca
- Fundación Real Madrid
- Hadas
- Halcones CFFAR
- Jaiba Brava
- Lioness
- Street Soccer
- Zacatepec

=== SuperLiga Zona Bajío ===
Group I	Group II
Cozolitas; Delegon; Hechiceras; Juventinas; Rayadas Pedregoso; Roma; Toros Querétaro	ACAFUT; FCA'S; Linces; Malcon's; Morenas; Revolution; Selección Chapala

=== Premier clubs (2nd level) ===
Group I	Group II
Bull Girls; Centellas; Hadas; IPN B; MacroAcapulco; Mopris; Necaxa; Neza NUN; PortuMixquiahuala; Rayaditas; Real Azteca; Tigres Coacalco; Tlatelolco; WFC	Alacrancitas; Borussia; Coyotas; Hadas B; IPN; Leonas; Pachuca San Antonio; Panters; Real Halconas; Selección Mazahua; Toronto; Tultitlán; Tuxpan

=== Segunda División clubs (3rd level) ===
Group I	Group II
F3AM; FRM; León Ixtapaluca; Linces; Neza NUN; Pumas 201; Pumas Belém; Sporting; Tigres Coacalco; Turín; Tuzas; Unión Nacional; WFC IMSS	Calcuta Soccer; Cazadoras; Coyotas Calimaya; Hadas; Hugo Sánchez; Jaguar Fuentes; Leonas Chalco; León; Panteras Negras; Pumas N.R.; Pumas Tláhuac; Venus; Yunque

== Champions ==
The list of all finals:

Tournament	Winner	Score	Runner up
Apertura 2007	Dragonas Oriente	2–1, 4–1	Leonas Negras UdeG
Clausura 2008	Morelia	1–0, 3–1	Oro Jalisco
Apertura 2008	Morelia	1–1, 1–0	Guadalajara
Clausura 2009	Guadalajara	3–0, 1–1	Andrea's Soccer
Apertura 2009	Morelia	0–2, 2–0 (a.e.t.) (5–4 pen)	Celestes AS
Clausura 2010	Leonas Negras UdeG	1–1, 2–1	Tlaquepaque
Apertura 2010	Celestes AS	0–0, 0–0 (a.e.t.) (4–3 pen.)	Morelia
Clausura 2011	Celestes AS	0–0, 1–0	Morelia
Apertura 2011	Morelia	2–2, 0–0 (a.e.t.) (3–2 pen.)	Celestes AS
Clausura 2012	Investigadoras PF	1–2, 4–2	Ángeles Morva
Apertura 2012	Investigadoras PF	5–1, 2–1	Club Laguna
Clausura 2013	Estudiantes Queretaro	1–1, 4–3	FCA UASLP
Apertura 2013	FCA UASLP	0–1, 2–0 (a.e.t.)	Ángeles Morva
Clausura 2014	Angeles PreUniversitario	1–0, 2–0	FCA UASLP
Apertura 2014	Centellas	0–1, 2–2 (a.e.t.)	Copan FC
Clausura 2015	Río Soccer	2–3, 3–1 (a.e.t.)	Coyotas Tlaxcala
Apertura 2015	Río Soccer	1–1, 4–1 (a.e.t.)	Coyotas Tlaxcala
Clausura 2016	Río Soccer	3–3, 4–1	Macro Soccer
Apertura 2016	Río Soccer	4–2, 8–0	Deportivo Hidro
Clausura 2017	Selección Femenil Puebla	1–0, 1–0	Fundación Real Madrid

== Titles by team ==
After 2017 Clausura.

Titles	Team
4	Morelia
4	Río Soccer
2	Celestes AS
2	Investigadoras PF
1	Angeles PreUniversitario
1	Centellas
1	Dragonas Oriente
1	Estudiantes Queretaro
1	Guadalajara
1	Leonas Negras UdeG
1	FCA UASLP
1	Selección Femenil Puebla

== See also ==
- Women's association football around the world
