= Laura Parra =

Mexican footballer (born 2002)

Personal information
- Full name: Laura Montserrat Parra Constantino
- Date of birth: 19 December 2000 (age 25)
- Place of birth: Guadalajara, Jalisco, Mexico
- Height: 1.58 m (5 ft 2 in)
- Position: Left-back

Team information
- Current team: Tijuana
- Number: 27

Senior career*
Years	Team	Apps	(Gls)
2018	América	7	(0)
2018–2023	Toluca	126	(1)
2023–2025	Atlético San Luis	51	(1)
2025–	Tijuana	10	(0)

International career
2019–2020	Mexico U20		
- * Club domestic league appearances and goals as of 9 February 2026

Laura Montserrat Parra Constantino (born 19 December 2000) is a Mexican professional football Left-back who currently plays for Tijuana of the Liga MX Femenil.

== Career ==
In 2018, Parra started her career in América. From 2018 to 2023, she was part of Toluca. In 2023, she was transferred of Atlético San Luis.

== International career ==
=== Mexico U-20 women's national football team ===
On March 8, 2020, Mexico U-20 women's national football team finished as Runners-up at the 2020 CONCACAF Women's U-20 Championship.

== Honours ==
Mexico U-20

- CONCACAF Women's U-20 Championship: Runners-up: 2020
