= Dayana Cázares =

Mexican football midfielder (born 1999)

Dayana Cazares
Personal information
- Full name: Dayana Joselyn Cazares Vera
- Date of birth: December 30, 1999 (age 26)
- Place of birth: Cuauhtémoc, DF, Mexico
- Height: 1.61 m (5 ft 3 1/2 in)
- Position: Midfielder

Senior career*
Years	Team	Apps	(Gls)
2017–2020	América	43	(23)
2021	Puebla	3	(1)

International career
2015–2016	Mexico U17		
2016–2018	Mexico U20		
- * Club domestic league appearances and goals as of 18 October 2017

Dayana Joselyn Cazares Vera (born December 30, 1999) is a Mexican professional football midfielder who currently plays for América of the Liga MX Femenil.

== Honors and awards ==
=== Club ===
Individual

- Liga MX Femenil Team of The Season: Apertura 2017

=== International ===
Mexico U20

- CONCACAF Women's U-20 Championship: 2018
