= Montserrat Hernández =

Mexican footballer (born 1999)

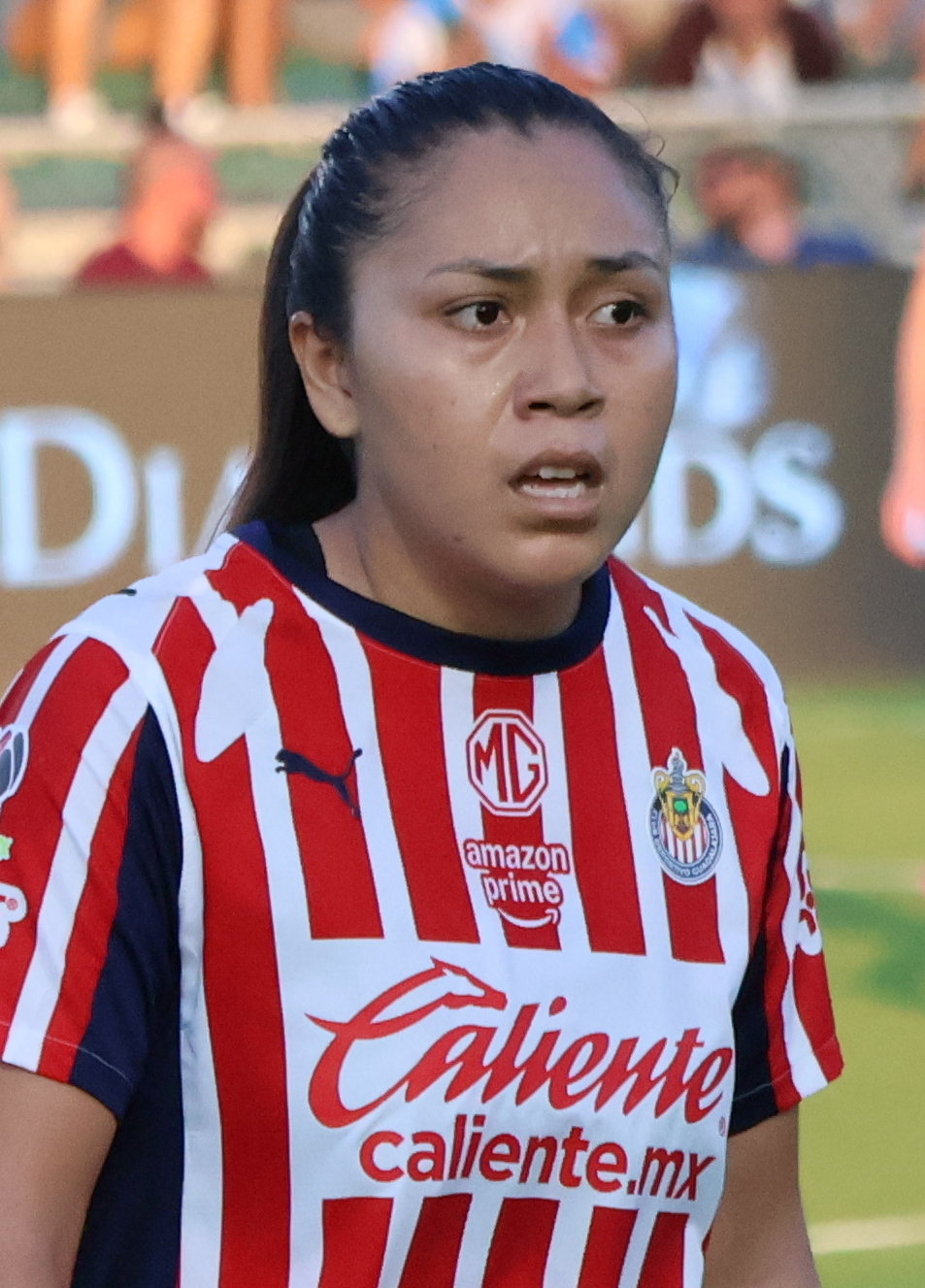
- Hernández with Guadalajara in 2025

Personal information
- Full name: Dorian Montserrat Hernández García
- Date of birth: 26 June 1999 (age 27)
- Place of birth: Zapotlán el Grande, Jalisco, Mexico
- Height: 1.67 m (5 ft 6 in)
- Position: Winger

Team information
- Current team: UNAM
- Number: 11

Senior career*
Years	Team	Apps	(Gls)
2017–2023	América	157	(21)
2023–2025	Guadalajara	62	(5)
2026–	UNAM	5	(0)

International career^{‡}
2014–2016	Mexico U17	6	(0)
2018	Mexico U20	4	(0)
2021–	Mexico	3	(0)
- * Club domestic league appearances and goals as of 31 January 2023 ‡ National team caps and goals as of 10 April 2021

Dorian Montserrat Hernández García (born 26 June 1999) is a Mexican professional footballer who plays as a midfielder for Liga MX Femenil club UNAM.

== Early life ==
Hernández was born in Zapotlán el Grande, Jalisco.

== Club career ==
Hernández has played for América in Mexico.

== International career ==
Hernández represented Mexico at two FIFA U-17 Women's World Cup editions (2014 and 2016) and the 2018 FIFA U-20 Women's World Cup.

Hernández made her debut for the senior Mexico women's national team on 20 February 2021, as a 76th-minute substitution in a 3–1 friendly home win over Costa Rica at Estadio Azteca in Mexico City.

== Honours ==
Club América

- Liga MX Femenil: Apertura 2018, Clausura 2023
