= Mónica Rodríguez =

Mexican football player (born 1998)

Personal information
- Full name: Mónica Rodríguez Guzmán
- Date of birth: 3 August 1998 (age 28)
- Place of birth: Cuautla, Morelos, Mexico
- Height: 1.73 m (5 ft 8 in)
- Position: Right back

Team information
- Current team: Juárez
- Number: 14

Youth career
- Galeana Morelos

Senior career*
Years	Team	Apps	(Gls)
2017–2023	América	155	(0)
2024–	Juárez	0	(0)

International career^{‡}
2019–	Mexico	1	(0)
- * Club domestic league appearances and goals as of 1 January 2023 ‡ National team caps and goals as of 5 April 2019

Mónica Rodríguez Guzmán (born 3 August 1998) is a Mexican professional footballer who plays as a defender for the Liga MX Femenil side Juárez and the Mexico women's national team.

== International career ==
Rodríguez was part of the Mexico women's national under-17 team who reached the quarter finals of the 2014 FIFA U-17 Women's World Cup.

She made her debut for the senior Mexico women's national team on 12 December 2019, in a 6–0 friendly defeat by Brazil at Arena Corinthians in São Paulo.
