= Mazatlán F.C. (women) =

Mazatlán Femenil
- Full name: Mazatlán Fútbol Club Femenil
- Nickname: Las Cañoneras
- Founded: June 2, 2020; 6 years ago
- Dissolved: April 25, 2026; 3 months ago
- Ground: Estadio El Encanto; Mazatlán, Sinaloa
- Capacity: 20,195
- Owner: Grupo Salinas
- Chairman: Mauricio Lanz González
- League: Liga MX Femenil
- Clausura 2026: Regular phase: 12th Final phase: Did not qualify
Home colours	Away colours

Mazatlán Fútbol Club Femenil was a Mexican professional women's football club based in Mazatlán, Sinaloa that played in Liga MX Femenil. The club was established in June 2, 2020 after the Monarcas Morelia franchise announced that it would be relocating to the city of Mazatlán, Sinaloa and renamed as Mazatlán Fútbol Club Femenil.

== History ==
On June 2, 2020, it was officially announced that Monarcas Morelia was being relocated to Mazatlán, Sinaloa and that it would be rebranded as Mazatlán Futbol Club. On June 8, Mazatlán unveiled its crest and colors. The team colors were purple, black and white.

The relocation of the entire club structure led to the creation of the Mazatlán women's team. In addition to most of the Monarcas Morelia staff and coaching staff as long as the people involved accepted. As part of the new team, the board appointed Jessica Castañeda as the director, who became the second woman with a managerial position in the Liga MX Femenil clubs.

On July 19, 2020, it was announced that the women's team would share the Estadio de Mazatlán with the men's branch of the club.

Throughout its history, the team did not receive very much investment from its owner, which led to it never qualifying for the championship playoffs and to the coaching staff and players denouncing problems of inequality within the institution.

On April 22, 2026, the Liga MX owners' assembly approved the sale of Mazatlán F.C.'s affiliation certificate to Atlante and its relocation to Mexico City, which meant the absorption of all of Mazatlán's rights and obligations by the purchasing team. This resulted in the dissolution of Mazatlán's women's team at the end of the Clausura 2026 tournament, with its place being given to Atlante's women's team.

== Personnel ==
=== Club administration ===
Position	Staff
Chairman	(Mexico) Mauricio Lanz Gonzalez
Sporting director	(Mexico) Eliud Ruíz
