= Club Tijuana (women) =

Mexican professional women's football club

Tijuana Femenil
- Full name: Club Tijuana Xoloitzcuintles de Caliente Femenil
- Nicknames: Las Xoloitzcuintles; Perrísimas; Xolos Femenil; Rojinegras; Reinas del Mictlán; Xolas
- Founded: 5 December 2016; 9 years ago
- Ground: Estadio Caliente; Tijuana, Baja California
- Capacity: 27,333
- Owner: Servicios Profesionales de Operación S.A. de C.V.
- Chairman: Jorge Alberto Hank Inzunza
- Manager: Fernando Samayoa
- League: Liga Femenil
- Clausura 2026: Regular phase: 9th Final phase: Did not qualify
- Website: https://www.xolos.com.mx
Home colours	Away colours

Club Tijuana Femenil is a Mexican professional women's football club based in Tijuana, Baja California. The club competes in the Liga Femenil and has been the women's section of Club Tijuana since 2016. The Estadio Caliente serves as the team's home venue.

Although the current iteration of Tijuana Femenil was established in late 2016 alongside the founding of the Liga MX Femenil, Club Tijuana already had a professional women's team prior to the league’s formation, which the club co-founded in 2014. This team, for a period of time, participated in the Women's Premier Soccer League in the United States.

== History ==
=== Beginnings ===
On December 5, 2016, former Liga MX president, Enrique Bonilla, announced the establishment of a women's professional league in Mexico: the Liga MX Femenil. Under this initiative, each club in the Liga MX would field a team in the new league. Notoriously, even before the league's announcement, Club Tijuana already boasted a women's professional team, founded in 2014 in collaboration with the late Marbella Ibarra—who was a prominent advocate for women's football in Mexico and a local business owner in Tijuana, Baja California. The team competed in many regional tournaments within Mexico, and for a time, also in the Women's Premier Soccer League of the United States.

=== Liga MX Femenil ===
In February 2017, the club announced through its social media channels that it would be forming a women's side. That May, the 2017 Copa MX Femenil was contested between 12 teams, including Xolos Femenil. Las Perrísimas won their group, which also included Necaxa, Santos Laguna, and Monterrey. In the final, Tijuana fell 9–1 to Pachuca.

On July 29, 2017, led by technical director Andrea Rodebaugh, the Xolas debuted in Apertura 2017 on the road against América, a match they lost 1–0. Tijuana had been drawn into Group 2, along with América, Pachuca, Toluca, Pumas, Monarcas Morelia, Cruz Azul, and Veracruz.

The first goal by the Xoloitzcuintles in Liga MX Femenil was scored by Evelyn Fernández in week two of the Apertura tournament.

On February 18, 2020, Tijuana midfielder Valentina Oviedo, the Mexican-born daughter of former Colombian international footballer Frankie Oviedo, was called up to the Colombia women's national under-20 team. It marked the first time a player from the Liga MX Femenil was called up to a foreign national team.

On July 8, 2021, Tijuana Femenil signed their first-ever foreign player, American striker Angelina Hix, from the Chilean club Santiago Morning. Hix had played in both the Copa Libertadores and the UEFA Champions League.

Mexican-American forward Renae Cuéllar is the top scorer in club history, with 76 career goals for the Xolas.

=== Present ===
Over the last two seasons, Tijuana Femenil has established itself as one of the most competitive clubs in the league, having qualified for two consecutive years to the Liguilla. During the Clausura 2023, the club recorded their first ever victory in the Liguilla phase after defeating Monterrey 2–0 at home in the first leg of the quarterfinals.

== Personnel ==
=== Club administration ===
Position	Staff
Chairman	(Mexico) Jorge Alberto Hank Inzunza
Sporting director	(Mexico) Fernando Arce

Source: Club Tijuana

=== Coaching staff ===
Position	Staff
Manager	(Mexico) Fernando Samayoa
Assistant manager	(Mexico) Miguel Navarro
Fitness coaches	(Mexico) José Avendaño (Mexico) Lino Torres
Team doctors	(Mexico) Alma Meza (Mexico) Paola Loera
Physiotherapist	(Mexico) Marla Gallegos

Source: Liga MX Femenil

== Players ==
=== Current squad ===
As of 31 July 2026

Note: Flags indicate national team as defined under FIFA eligibility rules; some limited exceptions apply. Players may hold more than one non-FIFA nationality.

No.	Pos.	Nation	Player
1	GK	MEX	Ana Gaby Paz
2	DF	MEX	Karen Díaz
3	DF	MEX	Jazmín Enrigue
4	DF	PAR	Deisy Ojeda
6	MF	MEX	Fabiola Ibarra
7	MF	MEX	Jaquelín García
8	MF	MEX	Ammanda Marroquín
9	FW	BLR	Melana Surovtseva
10	FW	TUR	Kader Hançar
11	MF	ESA	Danielle Fuentes
13	MF	MEX	Dana Sandoval (on loan from Guadalajara)
14	DF	MEX	Vanessa González
16	MF	MEX	Alexa Curiel

No.	Pos.	Nation	Player
17	MF	RSA	Amogelang Motau
18	MF	JAM	Trudi Carter
19	FW	MEX	Mariana Munguía
20	FW	MEX	Daniela Carrandi
21	DF	MEX	Lía Morán
22	DF	MEX	Emili Bautista
24	DF	MEX	Michel Fong
27	DF	MEX	Laura Parra
30	FW	MEX	Mariana Andonaegui
31	GK	MEX	Abril Montiel
32	MF	MEX	Naomi Rojo
34	MF	USA	Briana Chagolla
35	GK	MEX	Marcela Molina

== Honours ==
=== National ===
- Copa MX Femenil
  - Runners-up (1): 2017
