= Leonardo Cuéllar =

Mexican footballer and manager (born 1952)

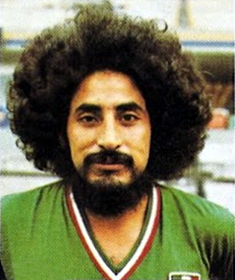
- Cuéllar with Mexico as depicted in a Panini trading card

Personal information
- Full name: Leonardo Cuéllar Rivera
- Date of birth: 14 January 1952 (age 74)
- Place of birth: Álvaro Obregón, Mexico City, Mexico
- Height: 1.75 m (5 ft 9 in)
- Position: Midfielder

Senior career*
Years	Team	Apps	(Gls)
1972–1979	UNAM		
1979–1981	San Diego Sockers	57	(9)
1980–1981	San Diego Sockers (indoor)	2	(0)
1981–1982	Atletas Campesinos		
1982	San Jose Earthquakes	20	(0)
1982–1983	Golden Bay Earthquakes (indoor)	25	(3)
1983–1984	Golden Bay Earthquakes	51	(3)

International career
1973–1981	Mexico	40	(3)

Managerial career
- 1998–2016: Mexico women
- 2017–2021: América women
- * Club domestic league appearances and goals

Leonardo Cuéllar Rivera (born 14 January 1952) is a Mexican football manager and former player who last acted as the manager of América in the Liga MX Femenil. He was the head coach of the Mexico women's national football team from 1998 to 2016.

== Playing career ==
=== Club ===
Cuéllar played for Pumas and Atletas Campesinos in Mexico. He played in the NASL between 1979 and 1984 for the San Diego Sockers, San Jose Earthquakes and Golden Bay Earthquakes. He played for the Earthquakes during the NASL indoor seasons.

=== International ===
Cuéllar also represented the Mexico national football team 40 times, scoring 3 goals and participated at the 1978 FIFA World Cup.

== Coaching ==
He was appointed as the Mexican Women's National Team's head coach in 1998. Cuéllar was in charge of improving the program and increasing its visibility overseas during his long 18-year tenure. Under his guidance, Mexico made it to their first and only Olympic Games in Athens in 2004 and qualified for three FIFA Women's World Cup in 1999, 2011, and 2015. In 2010, he led Mexico to an incredible 2-1 victory over the United States during the CONCACAF World Cup qualifiers, one of his most notable coaching accomplishments. This upset is still regarded as one of the most important outcomes in the history of the women's game.

During the early years of the professional Mexican women's league, Cuéllar transitioned into club management after his lengthy tenure with the national team. He was appointed Club America Femenil's first manager in February 2017. His influence was felt right away; during the Apertura 2018 tournament, he led the team to their first league championship by defeating Tigres UANL in a thrilling penalty shootout. Up until his resignation in March 2021, he led the "Águilas" for four years, continuously keeping them in the running for the playoffs.

Cuéllar returned to his roots at Pumas UNAM, the team where he started his playing career, in the years after leaving Club América. When he assumed the position of Coordinator of Development for the women's division in 2022, he turned his attention to youth scouting and the sport's structural development. His nearly two decades of national service and his pioneering role in creating the professional infrastructure that contemporary Mexican female athletes compete in today define his coaching legacy.

== Personal life ==
He has an American-born son, Christopher Cuéllar, who has coached Mexico women at under-17 and under-20 levels.
