= Atlético Morelia (women) =

Mexican football club

Atlético Morelia UMSNH Femenil
- Full name: Club Atlético Morelia Femenil
- Nicknames: Las Monarcas; Las Rojiamarillas
- Founded: 2017; 9 years ago
- Ground: Estadio UMSNH; Morelia, Michoacán
- Capacity: 5,000
- Owner(s): Club Atlético Morelia, S.A. de C.V.
- Chairman: Rubens Sambueza
- Manager: Francisco Farfan Reyes
- League: Liga TDP Femenil
Home colours	Away colours

Atlético Morelia Femenil, also referred as Atlético Morelia UMSNH Femenil, is a Mexican women's football club based in Morelia, Michoacán. Established in 2017, it is the women's section of Atlético Morelia. Since the 2025–26 season, the club competes in the Liga TDP Femenil, the bottom division of women's football in Mexico.

== Players ==
=== Squad ===
As of 5 October 2025

Note: Flags indicate national team as defined under FIFA eligibility rules; some limited exceptions apply. Players may hold more than one non-FIFA nationality.

No.	Pos.	Nation	Player
1	GK	MEX	Dana Castro
2	DF	MEX	Natalia Vargas
3	DF	MEX	Esbeidy Corona
4	MF	MEX	Evelin Yepez
5	FW	MEX	Sofia Medina
6	DF	MEX	Emily España
7	FW	MEX	Yaretzi Ramirez
8	FW	MEX	Yulissa Rios
9	MF	MEX	Esveydi Murillo
10	MF	MEX	Aixa Gutierrez
11	DF	MEX	Kenia Perez
12	DF	MEX	Dana Aguilar
13	GK	MEX	Joseline Alvarado Sanchez
14	MF	MEX	Frida Medina
15	MF	MEX	Alisson Rodriguez
16	MF	MEX	Paulina Villagomez
17	MF	MEX	Naomi Rodriguez

No.	Pos.	Nation	Player
18	MF	MEX	Vania Delgado
19	DF	MEX	Ahtziri Badillo
20	MF	MEX	Fernanda Rodriguez
21	FW	MEX	Alexa Villalobos
22	FW	MEX	Victoria Nuñez
23	MF	MEX	Naomi Hernández
24	MF	MEX	Fatima Casanova
25	DF	USA	Zhara Vazquez
26	DF	MEX	Danna Salgado
27	MF	MEX	Alessandra Medina
28	MF	MEX	Yohara Contreras
29	DF	MEX	Alondra Flores
30	MF	MEX	Maria Castillo
31	GK	MEX	Alexa Solis
35	GK	MEX	Brisa Rodriguez
37	DF	MEX	Erika Vergara
44	MF	MEX	Itzel Alcantar
