= 2018–19 Liga MX Femenil season =

Liga MX Femenil
- Season: 2018–19
- Champions: Apertura: América (1st title); Clausura: UANL (2nd title)
- Matches: 288
- Goals: 787 (2.73 per match)
- Top goalscorer: Apertura: Desirée Monsiváis (13 goals); Clausura: Fabiola Ibarra; Isela Ojeda (7 goals)
- Biggest home win: Apertura: Monterrey 8–0 Querétaro (19 August 2018); Clausura: UANL 7–1 Querétaro (7 January 2019)
- Biggest away win: Apertura: Morelia 1–5 Guadalajara (20 August 2018); Morelia 1–5 UANL (29 October 2018); Necaxa 0–4 Atlas (16 November 2018); Clausura: Veracruz 0–3 Pachuca (28 January 2019); Necaxa 1–4 UANL (1 February 2019); Veracruz 0–3 Cruz Azul (21 February 2019); Necaxa 0–3 Monterrey (1 March 2019); Atlas 0–3 Monterrey (13 April 2019)
- Highest scoring: Apertura: Monterrey 4–5 UANL (22 October 2018); Clausura: UANL 7–1 Querétaro (7 January 2019)
- Longest winning run: Apertura: 6 matches Pachuca; Clausura: 5 matches América; Atlas; Monterrey
- Longest unbeaten run: Apertura: 16 matches UANL; Clausura: 11 matches Monterrey
- Longest winless run: Apertura: 15 matches Santos Laguna; Clausura: 14 matches Necaxa
- Longest losing run: Apertura: 7 matches Cruz Azul; Clausura: 7 matches Querétaro
- Highest attendance: Apertura: 37,601; UANL vs Monterrey (13 August 2018); Clausura: 30,161; UANL vs Monterrey (28 January 2019)
- Lowest attendance: Apertura: 70; Veracruz vs Toluca (25 October 2018); Clausura: 125; Veracruz vs Cruz Azul (21 February 2019)
- Total attendance: Apertura: 250,304; Clausura: 262,754
- Average attendance: Apertura: 1,738; Clausura: 1,825

The 2018–19 Liga MX Femenil season was the second season of the top-flight women's football league in Mexico. The season was contested by eighteen teams, all being the counterpart women's teams of the men's league clubs Liga MX. The season was split into two championships—the Torneo Apertura and the Torneo Clausura—each in an identical format and each contested by the same eighteen teams. Unlike the inaugural season, all eighteen Liga MX clubs fielded a women's team.

== Teams, stadiums, and personnel ==
The following eighteen teams competed this season. Puebla and Lobos BUAP are fielding a team for the first time.

=== Stadiums and locations ===
América	Atlas	BUAP	Cruz Azul	Guadalajara	León
Estadio Azteca	Estadio Jalisco	Estadio Universitario BUAP	Estadio 10 de Diciembre	Estadio Akron	Estadio León
Capacity: 81,070	Capacity: 55,110	Capacity: 19,283	Capacity: 7,761	Capacity: 46,232	Capacity: 31,297
	Barra 51				
Monterrey	Morelia	Necaxa	Pachuca	Puebla	Querétaro
Estadio BBVA Bancomer	Estadio Morelos	Estadio Victoria	Estadio Hidalgo	Estadio Cuauhtémoc	Estadio Corregidora
Capacity: 51,348	Capacity: 34,795	Capacity: 23,851	Capacity: 27,512	Capacity: 51,726	Capacity: 33,162
Santos Laguna	Tijuana	Toluca	UANL	UNAM	Veracruz
Estadio Corona	Estadio Caliente	Estadio Nemesio Díez	Estadio Universitario	La Cantera	Estadio Luis "Pirata" Fuente
Capacity: 29,237	Capacity: 27,333	Capacity: 31,000	Capacity: 41,886	Capacity: 2,000	Capacity: 28,703

=== Alternate venues ===
- América – Cancha Centenario No. 5
- Atlas – Estadio Colomos Alfredo 'Pistache' Torres (Capacity: 3,000)
- Guadalajara – Verde Valle
- Monterrey – El Barrial (Capacity: 570)
- UANL – Instalaciones Zuazua (Capacity: 800)
Location of the 2018–19 Liga MX Femenil teams
Location of the 2018–19 Liga MX Femenil teams in Greater Mexico City

=== Personnel and kits ===
Team	Chairman	Head coach	Kit manufacturer	Shirt sponsor(s)
América	Santiago Baños	(Mexico) Leonardo Cuéllar	Nike	Huawei
Atlas	Gustavo Guzmán	(Mexico) Fernando Samayoa	Adidas	Linio
BUAP	Juan Carlos Bozikián	(Mexico) José Julio Cevada	Pirma	Zurich
Cruz Azul	Guillermo Álvarez Cuevas	(Mexico) Hugo Santana	Under Armour	Cemento Cruz Azul
Guadalajara	Jorge Vergara	(Mexico) Luis Manuel Díaz	Puma	Sello Rojo
León	Jesús Martínez Murguia	(Mexico) Everaldo Begines	Pirma	Cementos Fortaleza
Monterrey	Duilio Davino	(Mexico) Héctor Becerra	Puma	AT&T
Morelia	Álvaro Dávila	(Mexico) Filadelfo Rangel	Pirma	Kansas City Southern de México
Necaxa	Ernesto Tinajero Flores	(Mexico) Fabiola Vargas	Charly	Rolcar
Pachuca	Jesús Martínez Patiño	(Mexico) Eva Espejo	Charly	Cementos Fortaleza
Puebla	Manuel Jiménez García	(Mexico) Jorge Gómez	Li-Ning	AT&T
Querétaro	Jaime Ordiales	(Mexico) Alberto Arellano	Puma	Banco Multiva
Santos Laguna	Alejandro Irarragorri	(Mexico) Jorge Macías	Charly	Soriana
Tijuana	Jorge Hank Inzunsa	(Mexico) Gerardo Romo	Charly	Caliente
Toluca	Francisco Suinaga	(Mexico) Juan Carlos Mendoza	Under Armour	Banamex
UANL	Miguel Ángel Garza	(Mexico) Ramón Villa Zevallos	Adidas	Cemex
UNAM	Rodrigo Ares de Parga	(Mexico) Ileana Dávila	Nike	DHL
Veracruz	Fidel Kuri Mustieles	(Mexico) Rodolfo Vega	Charly	Winpot

== Format ==
- The Liga MX Femenil season is split into two championships: the Torneo Apertura (opening tournament) and the Torneo Clausura (closing tournament). Each is contested in an identical format and includes the same eighteen teams.
- The teams were divided into two groups of nine, the best four of each group advancing to the quarterfinals of the Liguilla.

=== Changes ===
- Due to the addition of Lobos BUAP and Puebla, this season consisted of two groups of nine teams, instead of two groups of eight.
- The Liguilla (playoffs) will now consist of a quarterfinals round, as a result, eight teams (four from each group) will now qualify to the Liguilla.
- This season will consist of 18 rounds (up from 14).
- Morelia moved from Group 1 to Group 2.
- Two teams (one from each group) will rest each round.

== Torneo Apertura ==
The Apertura 2018 regular season started on 13 July and ended on 19 November.

=== Regular season ===
==== League table ====
Pos	Team	Pld	W	D	L	GF	GA	GD	Pts	Qualification or relegation
1	UANL	16	12	4	0	51	19	+32	40	Advance to Liguilla (Note: The top four teams of each group advance to the quarterfinals of the Liguilla.)
2	Pachuca	16	12	2	2	31	14	+17	38	Advance to Liguilla
3	América (C)	16	11	2	3	28	12	+16	35	Advance to Liguilla
4	Guadalajara	16	9	4	3	30	16	+14	31	Advance to Liguilla
5	Monterrey	16	8	6	2	38	15	+23	30	Advance to Liguilla
6	Toluca	16	9	3	4	37	17	+20	30	Advance to Liguilla
7	UNAM (Note: The UNAM v Cruz Azul match resulted in a 0–1 victory for Cruz Azul, but was later ruled a 3–0 victory for UNAM due to Cruz Azul aligning an assistant manager who was part of the coaching staff of another club (Puebla) this same season.)	16	9	3	4	20	10	+10	30	Advance to Liguilla
8	Atlas	16	8	5	3	28	13	+15	29	Advance to Liguilla
9	Puebla	16	6	7	3	25	12	+13	25	
10	León	16	6	4	6	20	21	−1	22	
11	Querétaro	16	4	5	7	16	32	−16	17	
12	BUAP	16	4	2	10	18	28	−10	14	
13	Morelia	16	3	4	9	15	34	−19	13	
14	Veracruz	16	3	4	9	14	35	−21	13	
15	Tijuana	16	2	3	11	10	28	−18	9	
16	Cruz Azul	16	2	2	12	12	39	−27	8	
17	Santos Laguna	16	1	4	11	14	34	−20	7	
18	Necaxa	16	1	4	11	5	33	−28	7	

Source: Liga MX Femenil
Rules for classification: 1) Points; 2) Goal difference; 3) Number of goals scored; 4) Number of away goals scored; 5) Head-to-head results between tied teams; 6) Drawing of lots
(C) Champions

==== Group 1 ====
Pos	Team	Pld	W	D	L	GF	GA	GD	Pts	Qualification or relegation
1	Pachuca	16	12	2	2	31	14	+17	38	Advance to Liguilla
2	América	16	11	2	3	28	12	+16	35	Advance to Liguilla
3	Toluca	16	9	3	4	37	17	+20	30	Advance to Liguilla
4	UNAM (Note: The UNAM v Cruz Azul match resulted in a 0–1 victory for Cruz Azul, but was later ruled a 3–0 victory for UNAM due to Cruz Azul aligning an assistant manager who was part of the coaching staff of another club (Puebla) this same season.)	16	9	3	4	20	10	+10	30	Advance to Liguilla
5	Puebla	16	6	7	3	25	12	+13	25	
6	BUAP	16	4	2	10	18	28	−10	14	
7	Veracruz	16	3	4	9	14	35	−21	13	
8	Tijuana	16	2	3	11	10	28	−18	9	
9	Cruz Azul	16	2	2	12	12	39	−27	8	

Source: Liga MX Femenil
Rules for classification: 1) Points; 2) Goal difference; 3) Number of goals scored; 4) Head-to-head results between tied teams; 5) Drawing of lots

==== Group 2 ====
Pos	Team	Pld	W	D	L	GF	GA	GD	Pts	Qualification or relegation
1	UANL	16	12	4	0	51	19	+32	40	Advance to Liguilla
2	Guadalajara	16	9	4	3	30	16	+14	31	Advance to Liguilla
3	Monterrey	16	8	6	2	38	15	+23	30	Advance to Liguilla
4	Atlas	16	8	5	3	28	13	+15	29	Advance to Liguilla
5	León	16	6	4	6	20	21	−1	22	
6	Querétaro	16	4	5	7	16	32	−16	17	
7	Morelia	16	3	4	9	15	34	−19	13	
8	Santos Laguna	16	1	4	11	14	34	−20	7	
9	Necaxa	16	1	4	11	5	33	−28	7	

Source: Liga MX Femenil
Rules for classification: 1) Points; 2) Goal difference; 3) Number of goals scored; 4) Head-to-head results between tied teams; 5) Drawing of lots

==== Positions by round ====
The table lists the positions of teams after each week of matches. In order to preserve chronological evolvements, any postponed matches are not included in the round at which they were originally scheduled, but added to the full round they were played immediately afterwards. For example, if a match is scheduled for matchday 8, but then postponed and played between days 11 and 12, it will be added to the standings for day 12.

Team ╲ Round	1	2	3	4	5	6	7	8	9	10	11	12	13	14	15	16	17	18
UANL	3	1	2	1	3	2	1	1	1†	1	1	2	1	1	1	1	1	1†
Pachuca	4	3	5	4	4	5†	5	4	5	4	4	3	3	3	3†	3	2	2
América	9†	10	4	3	2	4	3	5	3	5†	5	4	6	4	4	2	3	3
Guadalajara	7	2	1	2	1	1	2†	3	4	3	2	1	2	2	2	4†	5	4
Monterrey	10†	7	7	9	9	6	6	7	6	8†	6	6	5	7	6	6	7	5
Toluca	1	8	11†	7	5	3	4	2	2	2	3	5†	4	5	5	5	4	6
UNAM	15	13†	12	13	11	7	8	6	8	7	8†	7	8	8	8	7	6	7
Atlas	12	17	14	10	6	8†	7	8	7	6	7	8	7	7	7†	8	8	8
Puebla	2	9	8	11	13	13	13†	10	10	10	11	9	9	9	9	9†	9	9
León	14	16	16	17†	17	16	15	14	11	12	13	12	12†	12	11	10	10	10
Querétaro	16	15†	13	14	12	12	11	9	9	9	10†	10	11	11	12	11	11	11
BUAP	17	11	10	6	8	10	10	11†	14	13	9	11	10	10	10	12	12†	12
Morelia	8	5	6	8	10†	11	12	13	15	15	15	15	15	15†	14	14	13	13
Veracruz	18	12	15	16†	15	14	14	15	13	11	12	13	13†	13	13	13	14	14
Tijuana	6	6	3	5	7	9	9	12	12†	14	14	14	14	14	15	15	15	15†
Cruz Azul	11	14	17	18	18†	18	18	18	18	18	18	18	18	18†	18	18	18	16
Santos Laguna	5	4	9	12	14	15	16	16†	16	16	16	16	17	17	17	17	16†	17
Necaxa	13	18	18†	15	16	17	17	17	17	17	17	17†	16	16	16	16	17	18

Leader and qualification to playoffs
Last place

Source: Liga MX Femenil
Notes: † indicates team rested that round.

==== Results ====
Group 1

Home \ Away	AMÉ	BUP	CAZ	PAC	PUE	TIJ	TOL	UNM	VER
América		2–1	3–0	0–2	2–0	2–1	2–1	0–1	2–0
BUAP	1–2		4–3	2–3	0–2	2–1	2–2	0–1	0–2
Cruz Azul	0–3	2–3		1–2	0–0	3–1	0–3	0–2	2–1
Pachuca	3–2	1–0	3–0		2–1	1–0	1–2	1–0	3–0
Puebla	1–1	0–0	3–0	3–3		3–0	1–2	1–1	4–0
Tijuana	0–1	0–2	1–1	1–0	0–3		1–2	1–0	0–0
Toluca	1–1	4–0	5–0	0–1	0–2	3–1		1–2	7–1
UNAM	0–2	1–0	3–0	0–3	0–0	4–1	0–0		2–0
Veracruz	0–3	2–1	2–0	2–2	1–1	1–1	2–4	0–3	

Updated to match(es) played on unknown. Source: Liga MX Femenil
Legend: Blue = home team win; Yellow = draw; Red = away team win.

Group 2

Home \ Away	ATL	GUA	LEÓ	MON	MOR	NEC	QUE	SLA	UNL
Atlas		0–2	3–0	1–1	2–0	4–1	5–0	1–0	1–1
Guadalajara	2–0		1–0	1–3	1–1	1–0	1–1	3–1	1–3
León	1–2	3–5		1–1	1–0	1–0	1–1	3–0	1–3
Monterrey	1–1	0–0	0–1		5–0	4–0	8–0	2–0	4–5
Morelia	1–0	1–5	1–3	1–1		1–2	1–2	3–2	1–5
Necaxa	0–4	0–3	0–0	0–2	0–0		0–1	0–1	1–3
Querétaro	0–1	0–0	2–1	1–2	0–3	0–0		3–1	1–2
Santos Laguna	1–1	1–3	1–2	1–2	1–1	1–1	2–2		1–4
UANL	2–2	2–1	1–1	2–2	4–0	7–0	4–2	3–0	

Updated to match(es) played on unknown. Source: Liga MX Femenil
Legend: Blue = home team win; Yellow = draw; Red = away team win.

==== Top goalscorers ====
Players sorted first by goals scored, then by last name.

Rank	Player	Club	Goals
1	Desirée Monsiváis	Monterrey	13
2	Katty Martínez	UANL	12
3	Mariel Román	Toluca	11
4	Mariela Jiménez	Puebla	9
5	Diana Evangelista	Monterrey	8
5	Mónica Ocampo	Pachuca	8
7	Casandra Cuevas	América	7
7	Yahaira Flores	Santos Laguna	7
7	Fabiola Ibarra	Atlas	7
7	Sanjuana Muñoz	León	7

Source: Liga MX Femenil

==== Attendance ====
===== Per team =====
Pos	Team	Total	High	Low	Average	Change
1	UANL	82,576	37,601	400	10,322	+128.7%
2	Pachuca	31,978	7,444	2,145	3,997	−12.1%
3	Monterrey	25,289	17,321	235	3,161	+203.7%
4	Morelia	16,404	5,024	753	2,051	+41.0%
5	Tijuana	13,684	6,333	933	1,711	+17.0%
6	Guadalajara	13,108	4,439	310	1,639	+19.9%
7	Toluca	12,929	3,899	557	1,616	−77.6%
8	Atlas	8,549	5,652	163	1,069	+123.2%
9	León	7,307	2,047	305	913	−62.6%
10	Santos Laguna	7,017	1,759	421	877	−43.2%
11	Puebla	5,373	1,700	150	672	n/a^{1}
12	Querétaro	5,303	1,125	310	663	−65.6%
13	BUAP	4,778	935	300	597	n/a^{1}
14	Cruz Azul	4,701	1,213	313	588	−11.7%
15	UNAM	4,682	800	420	585	−7.4%
16	América	4,189	1,504	270	524	−72.7%
17	Necaxa	3,418	1,200	182	427	−52.1%
18	Veracruz	2,278	485	70	285	−53.3%
	League total	253,563	37,601	70	1,761	−13.9%

Updated to games played on 19 November 2018
Source: Liga MX Femenil
Notes:
Only regular season listed
1: New team.

===== Highest and lowest =====
Highest attendance					Lowest attendance			
Week	Home	Score	Away	Attendance	Home	Score	Away	Attendance
1	UANL	4–2	Querétaro	9,235	Necaxa	0–1	Santos Laguna	460
2	Pachuca	2–1	Puebla	7,444	Monterrey	4–0	Necaxa	250
3	UANL	2–2	Atlas	7,250	UNAM	2–0	Veracruz	800
4	Monterrey	0–0	Guadalajara	4,645	Atlas	5–0	Querétaro	327
5	UANL	2–2	Monterrey	37,601	Veracruz	2–2	Pachuca	365
6	Morelia	1–5	Guadalajara	5,024	Monterrey	8–0	Querétaro	325
7	UANL	4–0	Morelia	7,150	Atlas	1–0	Santos Laguna	320
8	Guadalajara	1–3	UANL	2,389	Necaxa	0–0	León	223
9	Pachuca	1–2	Toluca	3,222	Atlas	4–1	Necaxa	257
10	Pachuca	4–0	Cruz Azul	4,231	Atlas	2–0	Morelia	163
11	Guadalajara	2–0	Atlas	4,439	Necaxa	0–2	Monterrey	284
12	Pachuca	1–0	Tijuana	2,343	Monterrey	5–0	Morelia	235
13	Guadalajara	1–3	Monterrey	1,668	Cruz Azul	0–3	Toluca	319
14	Monterrey	4–5	UANL	17,321	BUAP	0–1	UNAM	300
15	UANL	7–0	Necaxa	3,215	Veracruz	2–1	BUAP	70
16	Morelia	1–5	UANL	2,101	Necaxa	0–1	Querétaro	183
17	UANL	2–1	Guadalajara	13,521	Veracruz	2–4	Toluca	98
18	Morelia	1–3	León	1,519	Necaxa	0–4	Atlas	182

Source: Liga MX

=== Liguilla – Apertura ===
==== Bracket ====
Quarterfinals
1	UANL	2	0	2
8	Atlas	1	0	1
4	Guadalajara (a)	1	0	1
5	Monterrey	1	0	1
2	Pachuca	1	5	6
7	UNAM	0	1	1
3	América	2	3	5
6	Toluca	2	1	3

Semifinals
1	UANL	1	4	5
4	Guadalajara	1	2	3
2	Pachuca	0	0	0
3	América	0	1	1

Finals
1	UANL	2	1	3 (1)
3	América (pen.)	2	1	3 (3)

- The top four clubs of each group qualify
- The eight clubs who qualified will be ranked and seeded 1 to 8 based on performance in the regular season
- Teams may be re-seeded each round.
- Team with more goals on aggregate after two matches advances.
- Away goals rule is applied in the quarterfinals and semifinals, but not the final.
- In the quarterfinals and semifinals, if the two teams are tied on aggregate and away goals, the higher seeded team advances.
- In the final, if the two teams are tied after both legs, the match goes to extra-time and, if necessary, a shootout.

==== Quarterfinals ====
Team 1	Agg.	Team 2	1st leg	2nd leg
Atlas	1–2	UANL	1–2	0–0
UNAM	1–6	Pachuca	0–1	1–5
Toluca	3–5	América	2–2	1–3
Monterrey	1–1 (a)	Guadalajara	1–1	0–0

First leg

21 November 2018	Toluca	2–2	América	Toluca, Estado de México
18:00	Miranda 42'; Román 44'	Report	C. Cuevas 34', 72'	Stadium: Estadio Nemesio Díez; Attendance: 2,815; Referee: Lizzet Amairany García

22 November 2018	Monterrey	1–1	Guadalajara	Guadalupe, Nuevo León
19:00	Bernal 6' (pen.)	Report	Monsiváis 47' (o.g.)	Stadium: Estadio BBVA Bancomer; Attendance: 3,065; Referee: Guadalupe Arellano

23 November 2018	Atlas	1–2	UANL	Zapopan, Jalisco
11:00	Maldonado 87'		E. González 40'; K. Martínez 65'	Stadium: Estadio Colomos Alfredo 'Pistache' Torres; Attendance: 710; Referee: María Cristina Alfaro

23 November 2018	UNAM	0–1	Pachuca	Coyoacán, Mexico City
15:00		Report	Ocampo 86'	Stadium: La Cantera; Attendance: 873; Referee: Francia González

Second leg

24 November 2018	América	3–1 (5–3 agg.)	Toluca	Coyoacán, Mexico City
15:00	L. Cuevas 1'; Espinosa 13', 39'	Report	Román 43'	Stadium: Estadio Cancha Centenario; Attendance: 810; Referee: Quetzalli Alvarado

25 November 2018	Guadalajara	0–0 (1–1 agg.)	Monterrey	Zapopan, Jalisco
19:00		Report		Stadium: Estadio Akron; Attendance: 3,116; Referee: Priscila Pérez
Note: Tied 1–1 on aggregate. Guadalajara won on away goals

26 November 2018	Pachuca	5–1 (6–1 agg.)	UNAM	Pachuca, Hidalgo
18:00	Ocampo 41', 64'; Cagigas 49' (o.g.); Salazar 76'; Hernández 83'	Report	Santamaría 24'	Stadium: Estadio Hidalgo; Attendance: 8,322; Referee: Karen Hernández Andrade

26 November 2018	UANL	0–0 (2–1 agg.)	Atlas	San Nicolás de los Garza, Nuevo León
20:00		Report		Stadium: Estadio Universitario; Attendance: 16,269; Referee: Katia Itzel García

==== Semifinals ====
Team 1	Agg.	Team 2	1st leg	2nd leg
Guadalajara	3–5	UANL	1–1	2–4
América	1–0	Pachuca	0–0	1–0

First leg

30 November 2018	América	0–0	Pachuca	Coyoacán, Mexico City
15:00		Report		Stadium: Estadio Cancha Centenario; Attendance: 857; Referee: Priscila Pérez

30 November 2018	Guadalajara	1–1	UANL	Zapopan, Jalisco
20:00	Viramontes 17'	Report	Cruz 33'	Stadium: Estadio Akron; Attendance: 3,719; Referee: Gustavo Padilla

Second leg

3 December 2018	Pachuca	0–1 (0–1 agg.)	América	Pachuca, Hidalgo
18:00		Report	L. Cuevas 12'	Stadium: Estadio Hidalgo; Attendance: 10,332; Referee: Katia Itzel García Mendoza

3 December 2018	UANL	4–2 (5–3 agg.)	Guadalajara	San Nicolás de los Garza, Nuevo León
20:00	Mercado 15'; Ovalle 32'; Espinoza 41'; Jaramillo 90+2'	Report	Bejarano 30'; Palafox 40'	Stadium: Estadio Universitario; Attendance: 21,863; Referee: Quetzalli Alvarado

==== Finals ====
Team 1	Agg.	Team 2	1st leg	2nd leg
América	3–3 (3–1 p)	UANL	2–2	1–1

First leg

11 December 2018	América	2–2	UANL	Coyoacán, Mexico City
16:00	González 43'; C. Cuevas 71'	Report	Peralta 73' (o.g.); Ovalle 85'	Stadium: Estadio Azteca; Attendance: 33,430; Referee: Priscila Pérez

Second leg

15 December 2018	UANL	1–1 (3–3 agg.) (1–3 p)	América	San Nicolás de los Garza, Nuevo León
19:00	Mercado 72' (pen.)	Report	González 45+1'	Stadium: Estadio Universitario; Attendance: 41,121; Referee: Quetzalli Alvarado
	Penalties
	Rangel (penalty missed); Jaramillo (penalty missed); Antonio (penalty scored); Cruz (penalty missed)		(penalty scored) Díaz; (penalty missed) García; (penalty scored) Verdugo; (penalty scored) Cuevas

Apertura 2018 winners:

1st title

== Torneo Clausura ==
The Clausura 2019 is the second championship of the season. The regular season started on 4 January 2019 and will end on 24 April 2019.

=== Regular season ===
==== League table ====
Pos	Team	Pld	W	D	L	GF	GA	GD	Pts	Qualification or relegation
1	Monterrey	16	13	2	1	43	13	+30	41	Advance to Liguilla (Note: The top four teams of each group advance to the quarterfinals of the Liguilla.)
2	América	16	12	2	2	29	10	+19	38	Advance to Liguilla
3	UANL (C)	16	11	3	2	36	12	+24	36	Advance to Liguilla
4	Pachuca	16	11	3	2	33	13	+20	36	Advance to Liguilla
5	Atlas	16	11	1	4	32	18	+14	34	Advance to Liguilla
6	Puebla	16	8	4	4	13	10	+3	28	Advance to Liguilla
7	León	16	7	3	6	21	23	−2	24	Advance to Liguilla
8	Guadalajara	16	7	2	7	17	17	0	23	
9	UNAM	16	7	1	8	19	16	+3	22	Advance to Liguilla
10	BUAP (Note: The BUAP v Cruz Azul match resulted in a 1–1 draw, but was later ruled a 3–0 victory for BUAP due to Cruz Azul aligning three overage players on the field at the same time. Clubs are allowed to register up to four players older than 24 per match but only two can be on the field at the same time.)	16	6	3	7	20	17	+3	21	
11	Santos Laguna	16	5	3	8	19	25	−6	18	
12	Veracruz	16	5	2	9	10	24	−14	17	
13	Toluca	16	4	3	9	14	23	−9	15	
14	Morelia	16	3	5	8	20	32	−12	14	
15	Cruz Azul	16	3	4	9	18	27	−9	13	
16	Tijuana	16	3	4	9	10	26	−16	13	
17	Necaxa	16	1	4	11	9	31	−22	7	
18	Querétaro	16	1	3	12	17	43	−26	6	

Source: Liga MX Femenil
Rules for classification: 1) Points; 2) Goal difference; 3) Number of goals scored; 4) Number of away goals scored; 5) Head-to-head results between tied teams; 6) Drawing of lots
(C) Champions

==== Group 1 ====
Pos	Team	Pld	W	D	L	GF	GA	GD	Pts	Qualification or relegation
1	América	16	12	2	2	29	10	+19	38	Advance to Liguilla
2	Pachuca	16	11	3	2	33	13	+20	36	Advance to Liguilla
3	Puebla	16	8	4	4	13	10	+3	28	Advance to Liguilla
4	UNAM	15	7	1	7	19	16	+3	22	Advance to Liguilla
5	BUAP	16	6	3	7	20	17	+3	21	
6	Veracruz	16	5	2	9	10	24	−14	17	
7	Toluca	16	4	3	9	14	23	−9	15	
8	Cruz Azul	16	3	4	9	18	27	−9	13	
9	Tijuana	16	3	4	9	10	26	−16	13	

Source: Liga MX Femenil
Rules for classification: 1) Points; 2) Goal difference; 3) Number of goals scored; 4) Head-to-head results between tied teams; 5) Drawing of lots

==== Group 2 ====
Pos	Team	Pld	W	D	L	GF	GA	GD	Pts	Qualification or relegation
1	Monterrey	16	13	2	1	43	13	+30	41	Advance to Liguilla
2	UANL	16	11	3	2	36	12	+24	36	Advance to Liguilla
3	Atlas	16	11	1	4	32	18	+14	34	Advance to Liguilla
4	León	16	7	3	6	20	23	−3	24	Advance to Liguilla
5	Guadalajara	16	7	2	7	17	17	0	23	
6	Santos Laguna	16	5	3	8	19	25	−6	18	
7	Morelia	16	3	5	8	20	32	−12	14	
8	Necaxa	16	1	4	11	9	31	−22	7	
9	Querétaro	16	1	3	12	17	43	−26	6	

Source: Liga MX Femenil
Rules for classification: 1) Points; 2) Goal difference; 3) Number of goals scored; 4) Head-to-head results between tied teams; 5) Drawing of lots

==== Positions by round ====
The table lists the positions of teams after each week of matches. In order to preserve chronological evolvements, any postponed matches are not included in the round at which they were originally scheduled, but added to the full round they were played immediately afterwards. For example, if a match is scheduled for matchday 8, but then postponed and played between days 11 and 12, it will be added to the standings for day 12.

Team ╲ Round	1	2	3	4	5	6	7	8	9	10	11	12	13	14	15	16	17	18
Monterrey	11†	6	3	4	5	2	3	2	1	3†	3	1	1	3	1	1	1	1
América	12†	7	5	5	3	5	4	4	3	4†	5	5	5	4	2	2	3	2
UANL	1	5	2	2	4	1	1	1	4†	1	1	4	4	2	3	3	2	3†
Pachuca	2	3	1	1	1	3†	2	3	2	2	2	2	2	1	4†	5	4	4
Atlas	3	1	4	3	2	4†	5	7	5	5	4	3	3	5	5†	4	5	5
Puebla	9	12	9	9	7	8	9†	9	9	9	9	9	9	7	6	6†	6	6
León	16	11	7	6†	9	9	7	6	7	8	8	7	7†	9	7	8	9	7
Guadalajara	5	9	11	12	8	7	8†	8	8	7	7	8	8	6	8	9†	10	8
UNAM	4	8†	6	7	6	6	6	5	6	6	6†	6	6	8	10	10	7	9
BUAP	8	2	10	8	10	10	10	10†	10	12	13	14	11	11	9	7	8†	10
Santos Laguna	6	4	8	10	11	12	11	11†	11	10	10	10	10	10	11	11	11†	11
Veracruz	7	13	13	15†	16	17	17	15	16	14	15	13	15†	15	16	16	14	12
Toluca	10	15	14†	11	12	13	12	13	14	11	11	12†	14	14	12	12	12	13
Morelia	15	14	15	14	15†	15	16	14	15	16	16	16	16	16†	13	14	13	14
Cruz Azul	14	16	17	17	18†	16	14	16	13	13	14	15	12	12†	14	13	15	15
Tijuana	17	10	12	13	13	11	13	12	12†	15	12	11	13	13	15	15	16	16†
Necaxa	13	17	16†	16	17	18	18	18	18	18	18	18†	18	18	18	18	17	17
Querétaro	18	18†	18	18	14	14	15	17	17	17	17†	17	17	17	17	17	18	18

Leader and qualification to playoffs
Last place

Source: Liga MX Femenil
Notes: † indicates team rested that round.

==== Results ====
Group 1

Home \ Away	AMÉ	BUP	CAZ	PAC	PUE	TIJ	TOL	UNM	VER
América		1–0	2–1	2–0	1–0	5–1	3–1	0–1	4–0
BUAP	1–2		3–0	4–2	1–2	1–1	0–2	2–1	3–0
Cruz Azul	2–3	0–0		2–4	0–0	2–2	2–0	1–3	0–1
Pachuca	1–0	3–0	1–1		0–0	3–0	3–0	3–0	2–0
Puebla	0–2	1–0	3–1	0–2		0–0	2–0	1–0	1–1
Tijuana	0–1	0–2	0–2	2–2	0–1		1–0	0–2	1–0
Toluca	1–1	1–1	2–1	2–3	0–1	1–0		2–2	1–2
UNAM	1–2	1–0	3–0	0–1	0–1	3–0	0–1		2–1
Veracruz	0–0	0–2	0–3	0–3	2–0	1–2	1–0	1–0	

Updated to match(es) played on unknown. Source: Liga MX Femenil
Legend: Blue = home team win; Yellow = draw; Red = away team win.

Group 2

Home \ Away	ATL	GUA	LEÓ	MON	MOR	NEC	QUE	SLA	UNL
Atlas		2–0	2–2	0–3	2–0	3–1	4–0	3–4	2–1
Guadalajara	1–2		2–0	0–1	1–2	1–0	3–1	0–0	0–0
León	0–1	1–2		1–1	2–2	0–1	3–2	1–0	2–1
Monterrey	1–0	2–1	4–1		5–0	5–1	6–1	3–2	0–1
Morelia	1–3	0–1	2–3	3–4		3–1	3–1	2–2	0–1
Necaxa	0–2	1–2	0–1	0–3	1–1		1–1	0–1	1–4
Querétaro	2–3	0–1	0–2	1–3	0–0	1–1		4–0	1–4
Santos Laguna	0–2	3–1	0–1	0–1	1–1	3–0	2–1		1–3
UANL	2–1	2–1	3–1	1–1	4–0	0–0	7–1	2–0	

Updated to match(es) played on unknown. Source: Liga MX Femenil
Legend: Blue = home team win; Yellow = draw; Red = away team win.

==== Top goalscorers ====
Players sorted first by goals scored, then by last name.

Rank	Player	Club	Goals
1	Fabiola Ibarra	Atlas	7
1	Isela Ojeda	Santos Laguna	7
3	Lizbeth Ángeles	Monterrey	6
3	Aylín Avilez	Monterrey	6
3	Ana Paola López	Pachuca	6
3	Katty Martínez	UANL	6
3	Desirée Monsiváis	Monterrey	6
3	Sanjuana Muñoz	Pachuca	6
3	Edna Santamaría	UNAM	6

Source: Liga Mx Femenil

==== Attendance ====
===== Per team =====
Pos	Team	Total	High	Low	Average	Change
1	UANL	86,476	30,161	10,810	10,810	+4.7%
2	Monterrey	52,520	24,465	415	6,565	+107.7%
3	Pachuca	28,425	12,351	1,567	3,553	−11.1%
4	Toluca	11,904	6,323	483	1,488	−7.9%
5	León	10,308	4,975	424	1,289	+41.2%
6	Morelia	10,136	3,513	768	1,267	−38.2%
7	Guadalajara	9,434	2,395	230	1,179	−28.1%
8	Santos Laguna	8,079	1,764	615	1,010	+15.2%
9	Tijuana	7,062	2,033	433	883	−5.4%
10	América	6,255	1,454	480	782	+49.2%
11	Atlas	5,320	1,400	185	665	−37.8%
12	BUAP	4,696	1,350	234	587	−1.7%
13	Cruz Azul	4,395	913	337	549	−6.6%
14	Necaxa	4,389	1,170	315	549	+28.6%
15	Querétaro	4,286	1,107	244	536	−19.2%
16	Puebla	3,851	829	250	481	−28.4%
17	UNAM	3,196	673	149	400	−31.6%
18	Veracruz	2,023	485	125	253	−11.2%
	League total	262,755	30,161	125	1,825	+3.6%

Updated to games played on 22 April 2019
Source: Liga MX Femenil

===== Highest and lowest =====
Highest attendance					Lowest attendance			
Week	Home	Score	Away	Attendance	Home	Score	Away	Attendance
1	UANL	7–1	Querétaro	5,210	Puebla	1–1	Veracruz	363
2	Pachuca	0–0	Puebla	2,100	Veracruz	1–2	Tijuana	282
3	UANL	2–1	Atlas	10,269	UNAM	2–1	Veracruz	463
4	Toluca	2–1	Cruz Azul	6,323	Atlas	4–0	Querétaro	226
5	UANL	1–1	Monterrey	30,161	UNAM	1–0	BUAP	218
6	Morelia	0–1	Guadalajara	3,513	Cruz Azul	0–0	Puebla	339
7	UANL	4–0	Morelia	10,537	Querétaro	1–1	Necaxa	350
8	Monterrey	1–0	Atlas	1,762	Puebla	0–0	Tijuana	277
9	Pachuca	3–0	Toluca	2,843	Veracruz	0–3	Cruz Azul	125
10	León	1–2	Guadalajara	4,975	Veracruz	2–0	Puebla	145
11	UANL	3–1	León	2,893	Puebla	0–2	Pachuca	250
12	Santos Laguna	3–1	Guadalajara	1,481	Veracruz	1–0	UNAM	194
13	UANL	2–0	Santos Laguna	2,438	Querétaro	2–3	Atlas	245
14	Monterrey	0–1	UANL	24,465	BUAP	2–1	UNAM	475
15	UANL	0–0	Necaxa	8,847	Veracruz	0–2	BUAP	222
16	Monterrey	4–1	León	1,556	BUAP	4–2	Pachuca	234
17	UANL	2–1	Guadalajara	16,121	Veracruz	1–0	Toluca	286
18	Monterrey	3–2	Santos Laguna	20,148	Necaxa	0–2	Atlas	411

Source: Liga MX

=== Liguilla – Clausura ===
==== Bracket ====
Quarterfinals
1	Monterrey	2	3	5
8	UNAM	1	0	1
4	Pachuca	1	1	2
5	Atlas	0	1	1
2	América	1	1	2
7	León	0	1	1
3	UANL	2	2	4
6	Puebla	1	0	1

Semifinals
1	Monterrey (a)	2	1	3
4	Pachuca	3	0	3
2	América	0	1	1
3	UANL	2	3	5

Finals
1	Monterrey	1	1	2
3	UANL	1	2	3

- The top four clubs of each group qualify.
- The eight clubs who qualified will be ranked and seeded 1 to 8 based on performance in the regular season.
- Teams may be reseeded each round.
- Team with more goals on aggregate after two matches advances.
- Away goals rule is applied in the quarterfinals and semifinals, but not the final.
- In the quarterfinals and semifinals, if the two teams are tied on aggregate and away goals, the higher seeded team advances.
- In the final, if the two teams are tied after both legs, the match goes to extra-time and, if necessary, a shootout.

==== Quarterfinals ====
Team 1	Agg.	Team 2	1st leg	2nd leg
UNAM	1–5	Monterrey	1–2	0–3
León	1–2	América	0–1	1–1
Puebla	1–4	UANL	1–2	0–2
Atlas	1–2	Pachuca	0–1	1–1

First leg

24 April 2019	UNAM	1–2	Monterrey	Coyoacán, Mexico City
16:00	Santamaría 58'	Report	Monsiváis 68', 79'	Stadium: La Cantera; Attendance: 917; Referee: Isamel Rosario López

25 April 2019	Atlas	0–1	Pachuca	Zapopan, Jalisco
17:00		Report	Gómez 66' (pen.)	Stadium: Estadio Colomos Alfredo 'Pistache' Torres; Attendance: 1,470; Referee: Diana Pérez

25 April 2019	Puebla	1–2	UANL	Puebla City, Puebla
19:00	Jiménez 67'	Report	K. Martínez 71'; Mercado 90+3' (pen.)	Stadium: Estadio Cuauhtémoc; Attendance: 3,210; Referee: Lizzet García

25 April 2019	León	0–1	América	León, Guanajuato
21:00		Report	Espinosa 80' (pen.)	Stadium: Estadio León; Attendance: 29,235; Referee: Karen Hernández

Second leg

27 April 2019	Monterrey	3–0 (5–1 agg.)	UNAM	Guadalupe, Nuevo León
21:06	Garza 2'; Bernal 39' (pen.); Monsiváis 56' (pen.)	Report		Stadium: Estadio BBVA Bancomer, Attendance: 3,778; Referee: Martín Molina Astorga

28 April 2019	América	1–1 (2–1 agg.)	León	Coyoacán, Mexico City
16:00	Cuevas 58'	Report	Navarrete 36'	Stadium: Estadio Azteca; Attendance: 4,531; Referee: Priscila Eritzel Pérez

29 April 2019	Pachuca	1–1 (2–1 agg.)	Atlas	Pachuca, Hidalgo
19:00	Ángeles 64'	Report	González 72'	Stadium: Estadio Hidalgo; Attendance: 9,580; Referee: Katia Itzel García

29 April 2019	UANL	2–0 (4–1 agg.)	Puebla	San Nicolás de los Garza, Nuevo León
20:00	Espinoza 66'; Anguiano 81' (o.g.)	Report		Stadium: Estadio Universitario; Attendance: 11,228; Referee: Luis Alfredo García

==== Semifinals ====
Team 1	Agg.	Team 2	1st leg	2nd leg
Pachuca	3–3 (a)	Monterrey	3–2	0–1
UANL	5–1	América	2–0	3–1

First leg

2 May 2019	UANL	2–0	América	San Nicolás de los Garza, Nuevo León
21:00	K. Martínez 34', 60'	Report		Stadium: Estadio Universitario; Attendance: 12,346; Referee: Karen Hernández

3 May 2019	Pachuca	3–2	Monterrey	Pachuca, Hidalgo
19:00	Salazar 39', 61'; Ángeles 57'	Report	Monsiváis 64', 88' (pen.)	Stadium: Estadio Hidalgo; Attendance: 12,890; Referee: Diana Pérez

Second leg

5 May 2019	América	1–3 (1–5 agg.)	UANL	Coyoacán, Mexico City
16:00	Cázares 44'	Report	Ovalle 39'; K. Martínez 57', 75'	Stadium: Estadio Azteca; Attendance: 10,732; Referee: Katia Itzel García

6 May 2019	Monterrey	1–0 (3–3 agg.)	Pachuca	Guadalupe, Nuevo León
21:00	Nieto 15' (o.g.)	Report		Stadium: Estadio BBVA Bancomer, Attendance: 6,237; Referee: Priscila Pérez
Note: Monterrey won on away goals

==== Finals ====
Team 1	Agg.	Team 2	1st leg	2nd leg
UANL	3–2	Monterrey	1–1	2–1

First leg

10 May 2019	UANL	1–1	Monterrey	San Nicolás de los Garza, Nuevo León
21:00	Frías 62' (o.g.)	Report	Castillo 71'	Stadium: Estadio Universitario; Attendance: 34,135; Referee: Karen Hernández

Second leg

13 May 2019	Monterrey	1–2 (2–3 agg.)	UANL	Guadalupe, Nuevo León
20:00	Cervantes 68'	Report	Solís 9'; Ovalle 25'	Stadium: Estadio BBVA Bancomer, Attendance: 31,736; Referee: Diana Pérez

Clausura 2019 winners:

2nd title
