= 2019–20 Liga MX Femenil season =

Liga MX Femenil
- Season: 2019–20
- Champions: Apertura: Monterrey (1st title) Clausura: No title awarded
- Matches: 254
- Goals: 698 (2.75 per match)
- Top goalscorer: Apertura: Desirée Monsiváis; Viridiana Salazar (17 goals); Clausura: Fabiola Ibarra; Desirée Monsiváis (6 goals)
- Biggest home win: Apertura:Monterrey 6–1 Querétaro (12 August 2019); Clausura:Pachuca 5–0 Querétaro (24 February 2020)
- Biggest away win: Apertura: Juárez 0–6 Atlas (16 August 2019); Clausura: Atlético San Luis 1–6 UANL (24 February 2020)
- Highest scoring: Apertura: Atlético San Luis 1–6 Atlas (15 July 2019); Monterrey 6–1 Querétaro (12 August 2019); Clausura: Guadalajara 4–3 León (20 January 2019); Atlético San Luis 1–6 UANL (24 February 2020)
- Longest winning run: Apertura: 10 matches Monterrey; Clausura: 5 matches UANL
- Longest unbeaten run: Apertura: 10 matches UANL; Monterrey; Clausura: 8 matches UANL
- Longest winless run: Apertura: 15 matches Necaxa; Clausura: 10 matches Querétaro
- Longest losing run: Apertura: 7 matches Atlético San Luis; Clausura: 4 matches Querétaro
- Highest attendance: Apertura:26,531; UANL vs Monterrey (26 August 2019); Clausura:22,289; UNAM vs Cruz Azul (14 March 2020)
- Lowest attendance: Apertura:50; Tijuana vs Santos Laguna (22 August 2019); Clausura:175; León vs Toluca (3 February 2020)
- Total attendance: Apertura:380,355; Clausura:172,959
- Average attendance: Apertura:2,224; Clausura: 2,189
- Stats are from the regular season only

The 2019–20 Liga MX Femenil season was the third season of the top-flight women's football league in Mexico. The season was contested by nineteen teams the first semester and 18 the second, and all were the women's counterpart teams of the Liga MX. The season was split into two championships: the Torneo Apertura and the Torneo Clausura, each in an identical format and each contested by the same teams, unlike the two previous editions. Monterrey was crowned champion of the Apertura. However, due to league's suspension as a result of the COVID-19 pandemic, no team was selected as champion of the Clausura.

== Teams, stadiums, and personnel ==
After the addition of Atlético San Luis and FC Juárez, the latter formerly Lobos BUAP Femenil, 19 teams participated in the Apertura. Veracruz did not participate in the Clausura, reducing both the men's and women's leagues back to 18 teams.

=== Stadiums and locations ===
América	Atlas	Atlético San Luis	Cruz Azul	Guadalajara
Estadio Azteca	Estadio Jalisco	Estadio Alfonso Lastras	Estadio 10 de Diciembre	Estadio Akron
Capacity: 81,070	Capacity: 55,110	Capacity: 25,111	Capacity: 7,761	Capacity: 46,232
Juárez	León	Monterrey	Morelia	Necaxa
Estadio Olímpico Benito Juárez	Estadio León	Estadio BBVA	Estadio Morelos	Estadio Victoria
Capacity: 19,703	Capacity: 31,297	Capacity: 51,348	Capacity: 34,795	Capacity: 23,851
Pachuca	Puebla	Querétaro	Santos Laguna	Tijuana
Estadio Hidalgo	Estadio Cuauhtémoc	Estadio Corregidora	Estadio Corona	Estadio Caliente
Capacity: 27,512	Capacity: 51,726	Capacity: 33,162	Capacity: 29,237	Capacity: 27,333
Toluca	UANL	UNAM		
Estadio Nemesio Díez	Estadio Universitario	La Cantera		
Capacity: 31,000	Capacity: 41,886	Capacity: 2,000		

=== Alternate venues ===
- América – Cancha Centenario No. 5
- Atlas – Estadio Colomos Alfredo 'Pistache' Torres (Capacity: 3,000)
- Guadalajara – Verde Valle
- Monterrey – El Barrial (Capacity: 570)
- UANL – Instalaciones Zuazua (Capacity: 800)
Location of the 2019–20 Liga MX Femenil teams
Location of the 2019–20 Liga MX Femenil teams in Greater Mexico City

=== Personnel and kits ===
Team	Chairman	Head coach	Kit manufacturer	Shirt sponsor(s)
América	Santiago Baños	(Mexico) Leonardo Cuéllar	Nike	Huawei
Atlas	Pedro Portilla	(Mexico) Fernando Samayoa	Adidas	MoPlay
Atlético San Luis	Alberto Marrero	(Mexico) Luis Martínez	Pirma	Canel's
Cruz Azul	Guillermo Álvarez Cuevas	(Mexico) Rogelio Martínez	Joma	Cemento Cruz Azul
Guadalajara	Amaury Vergara	(Mexico) Ramón Villa Zevallos	Puma	Sello Rojo
Juárez	Guillermo Cantú	(Mexico) Gabino Amparán	Carrara	Del Río
León	Jesús Martínez Murguia	(Mexico) Everaldo Begines	Pirma	Cementos Fortaleza
Monterrey	Duilio Davino	(Mexico) Héctor Becerra	Puma	AT&T
Morelia	Mauricio Lanz González	(Mexico) Filadelfo Rangel	Pirma	Kansas City Southern de México
Necaxa	Ernesto Tinajero Flores	(Mexico) Fabiola Vargas	Charly	Rolcar
Pachuca	Jesús Martínez Patiño	(Mexico) Eva Espejo	Charly	Cementos Fortaleza
Puebla	Manuel Jiménez García	(Mexico) Jorge Gómez	Umbro	AT&T
Querétaro	Rodrigo Ares de Parga	(Mexico) Félix Martínez	Puma	Banco Multiva
Santos Laguna	Dante Elizalde	(Mexico) Martín Pérez Padrón	Charly	Soriana
Tijuana	Jorge Hank Inzunsa	(Mexico) Carla Rossi	Charly	Caliente
Toluca	Francisco Suinaga	(Mexico) Agustín Contreras	Under Armour	Banamex
UANL	Miguel Ángel Garza	(Mexico) Roberto Medina	Adidas	Cemex
UNAM	Leopoldo Silva Gutiérrez	(Mexico) Ileana Dávila	Nike	DHL Express

== Format ==
- The Liga MX Femenil season is split into two championships: the Torneo Apertura (opening tournament) and the Torneo Clausura (closing tournament). Each is contested in an identical format and includes the same nineteen teams.
- Since 2019–20 season the teams compete in a single group, the best eight of the general table qualify to the championship playoffs.

=== Changes ===
- With the addition of Atlético San Luis, this season consisted of nineteen teams.
- Lobos BUAP were bought by FC Juárez, Juárez acquired all the BUAP's obligations including have a women's team.
- This season will consist of 19 rounds (up from 17).
- One team will rest each round.
- During the previous 2 seasons, teams played against the other teams within the same group. This year, the group format was eliminated.

==== Mid-season changes ====
- Veracruz did not participate in the Clausura 2020 due to the disaffiliation of the men's team.

== Torneo Apertura ==
The Apertura 2019 season began on 12 July 2019 ended in December 2019.

=== Regular season ===
==== Standings ====
Pos	Team	Pld	W	D	L	GF	GA	GD	Pts	Qualification or relegation
1	Monterrey (C)	18	16	0	2	52	16	+36	48	Advance to Liguilla (Note: The first 8 places in the table qualify for the Liguilla.)
2	UANL	18	13	4	1	41	14	+27	43	Advance to Liguilla
3	Pachuca	18	11	3	4	42	24	+18	36	Advance to Liguilla
4	América	18	9	5	4	29	17	+12	32	Advance to Liguilla
5	Guadalajara	18	9	4	5	30	23	+7	31	Advance to Liguilla
6	Toluca	18	9	4	5	24	20	+4	31	Advance to Liguilla
7	Tijuana	18	8	5	5	27	21	+6	29	Advance to Liguilla
8	Atlas	18	7	7	4	35	20	+15	28	Advance to Liguilla
9	Morelia	18	8	4	6	30	28	+2	28	
10	Cruz Azul	18	6	6	6	28	25	+3	24	
11	León	18	6	5	7	23	21	+2	23	
12	Puebla	18	5	6	7	16	25	−9	21	
13	Querétaro	18	5	5	8	15	32	−17	20	
14	UNAM	18	4	7	7	18	16	+2	19	
15	Veracruz	18	4	5	9	17	29	−12	17	
16	Santos Laguna	18	4	4	10	17	28	−11	16	
17	Atlético San Luis	18	2	5	11	11	38	−27	11	
18	Juárez	18	1	4	13	8	37	−29	7	
19	Necaxa	18	1	3	14	6	35	−29	6	

Updated to match(es) played on 11 November 2019. Source: Liga MX Femenil
Rules for classification: 1) Points; 2) Goal difference; 3) Number of goals scored; 4) Head-to-head results between tied teams; 5) Number of goals scored away; 6) Highest relegation coefficient; 7) Fair Play points
(C) Champions

==== Positions by Round ====
Leader and qualification to liguilla
Qualification to liguilla
Last place in table

Team ╲ Round	1	2	3	4	5	6	7	8	9	10	11	12	13	14	15	16	17	18	19
Monterrey	7	4	2	4	2	1	1	2	2	1	1	1	1†	1	1	1	1	1	1
UANL	6	8†	8	7	7	6	4	3	3	3	4	3	3	3	2	2	2	2	2
Pachuca	2	2	1	1	1	2	2	1	1	2	2	2†	2	2	3	3	3	3	3
América	12†	16	14	10	10	9	7	4	7	9	9	6	6	6	5	4	5	4	4
Guadalajara	13	10	5	5	6	7	10†	8	8	6	5	4	4	5	7	6	8	6	5
Toluca	3	1	6	6	4	3	3	5	5	4	7	8	9	8	8	7	7	8†	6
Tijuana	16	14	15†	15	11	10	8	10	6	8	6	7	7	7	6	5	6	7	7
Atlas	1	6	10	9	9	8	6	7	4	5	3	5	5	4	4	8†	4	5	8
Morelia	14	17	12	13	17	17	14	12	10	7	8	9	8	10†	9	10	10	9	9
Cruz Azul	4	3	3	2	3	4	5	9	9	11	11†	10	10	9	10	9	9	10	10
León	11	13	16	16	13	15	16	16†	16	15	15	14	13	13	14	14	12	12	11
Puebla	18	11	13	14	8	13	12	13	14	14	12	11	11	11	11	11	11	11	12†
Querétaro	8	5	4	3	5	5†	9	6	11	10	10	12	12	12	13	13	13	13	13
UNAM	5	7	11	11	16	14	15	15	12	12†	14	13	14	14	12	12	14	14	14
Veracruz	9	12	7	8	12	11	11	11	13†	13	16	16	16	16	16	16	16	15	15
Santos Laguna	17	9	9	12	15†	16	17	17	17	16	13	15	15	15	15	15	15	16	16
Atlético San Luis	19	19	18	18	14	12	13	14	15	17	17	17	17	17	17	17	17†	17	17
Juárez	10	15	17	17	18	18	18	18	18	18	18	18	18	18	18†	18	18	18	18
Necaxa	15	18	19	19†	19	19	19	19	19	19	19	19	19	19	19	19	19	19	19

Updated to match(es) played on 11 November 2019. Source: Liga MX Femenil
Notes: † indicates team rested that round

==== Results ====
Teams play every other team once (either at home or away), with one team resting each round, completing a total of 19 rounds.

Home \ Away	AME	ATL	ASL	CAZ	GUA	JUA	LEO	MON	MOR	NEC	PAC	PUE	QUE	SAN	TIJ	TOL	UNL	UNM	VER
América	—	—	—	1–1	—	—	0–0	—	3–1	3–0	2–1	0–1	—	—	2–0	—	—	0–0	3–1
Atlas	1–1	—	—	2–2	1–1	—	1–3	1–2	—	2–0	—	2–0	—	—	—	3–0	1–4	—	—
Atlético San Luis	0–0	1–6	—	2–1	—	—	1–2	1–5	—	—	0–3	0–0	0–2	—	—	—	—	—	2–1
Cruz Azul	—	—	—	—	3–3	3–0	—	—	2–1	—	—	—	1–1	—	2–2	0–1	0–2	3–2	4–0
Guadalajara	4–2	—	2–1	—	—	1–0	—	—	2–0	—	—	1–0	2–1	2–3	0–1	—	—	1–1	—
Juárez	0–2	0–6	0–0	—	—	—	—	—	—	0–0	—	—	0–0	0–3	0–3	—	1–2	1–0	—
León	—	—	—	0–2	2–1	1–1	—	1–3	—	3–0	1–1	3–3	—	2–0	2–0	—	—	—	—
Monterrey	4–1	—	—	2–0	3–1	1–2	—	—	—	4–0	—	—	6–1	—	—	4–0	—	2–1	4–0
Morelia	—	0–0	2–0	—	—	2–1	2–1	0–1	—	—	3–3	—	2–0	—	—	—	3–3	—	3–1
Necaxa	—	—	1–1	1–3	0–3	—	—	—	0–2	—	—	2–3	0–1	1–0	—	1–2	—	0–0	—
Pachuca	—	2–2	—	3–1	1–2	5–1	—	4–2	—	1–0	—	—	—	—	—	1–2	3–2	—	3–2
Puebla	—	—	—	0–0	—	3–1	—	0–1	1–3	—	0–2	—	—	—	1–1	0–3	—	0–0	2–1
Querétaro	0–5	0–4	—	—	—	—	2–1	—	—	—	0–3	1–2	—	1–0	1–1	0–0	0–2	—	—
Santos Laguna	0–1	0–0	1–1	2–0	—	—	—	1–2	1–2	—	1–4	0–0	—	—	—	—	2–2	—	—
Tijuana	—	1–1	3–0	—	—	—	—	0–3	4–1	2–0	2–0	—	—	4–2	—	2–1	—	—	1–1
Toluca	1–2	—	3–1	—	1–2	1–0	1–1	—	4–2	—	—	—	—	2–0	—	—	0–0	2–1	—
UANL	2–1	—	4–0	—	2–1	—	1–0	3–2	—	4–0	—	4–0	—	—	2–0	—	—	0–0	—
UNAM	—	1–2	2–0	—	—	—	1–0	—	1–1	—	1–2	—	1–2	4–0	2–0	—	—	—	0–0
Veracruz	—	2–0	—	—	1–1	3–1	1–0	—	—	1–0	—	—	2–2	0–1	—	0–0	0–2	—	—

Updated to match(es) played on 11 November 2019. Source: Liga MX Femenil
Legend: Blue = home team win; Yellow = draw; Red = away team win.

=== Regular season statistics ===
==== Top goalscorers ====
Players sorted first by goals scored, then by last name.

Rank	Player	Club	Goals
1	(Mexico) Desirée Monsiváis	Monterrey	17
1	(Mexico) Viridiana Salazar	Pachuca	17
3	(Mexico) Daniela Espinosa	América	13
4	(Mexico) Renae Cuéllar	Tijuana	12
5	(Mexico) Katty Martínez	UANL	10
6	(Mexico) Diana Evangelista	Monterrey	9
6	(Mexico) Mariel Román	Toluca	9
6	(Mexico) Adriana Iturbide	Atlas	9
9	(Mexico) Lizbeth Ovalle	UANL	8
9	(Mexico) Alison González	Atlas	8
9	(Mexico) Dalia Molina	Morelia	8

Source: Liga MX Femenil

==== Hat-tricks ====
Player	For	Against	Result	Date	Round	Reference
(Mexico) Alison González	Atlas	Atlético San Luis	1–6 (A)	15 July 2019	1	
(Mexico) Desirée Monsiváis	Monterrey	América	4–1 (H)	9 September 2019	9	
(Mexico) Aylín Avilez	Monterrey	Necaxa	4–0 (H)	23 September 2019	12	
(Mexico) Estela Gómez	Santos Laguna	Guadalajara	2–3 (A)	13 October 2019	14	
(Mexico) Viridiana Salazar	Pachuca	Juárez	5–1 (H)	14 October 2019	14	

(H) – Home; (A) – Away

=== Attendance ===
==== Per team ====
Pos	Team	Total	High	Low	Average	Change
1	UANL	122,434	26,531	6,324	13,604	+25.8%
2	Atlético San Luis	61,867	17,113	1,008	6,874	n/a^{1}
3	Pachuca	47,648	8,923	2,356	5,294	+49.0%
4	Monterrey	26,113	7,121	307	2,901	−55.8%
5	Juárez	17,082	4,419	350	1,898	n/a^{1}
6	Guadalajara	13,579	5,613	470	1,509	+28.0%
7	Morelia	11,254	2,025	812	1,250	−1.3%
8	América	10,662	1,633	663	1,185	+51.5%
9	León	10,158	2,831	514	1,129	−12.4%
10	Toluca	9,656	2,357	325	1,073	−27.9%
11	Cruz Azul	8,736	1,764	311	971	+76.9%
12	Santos Laguna	8,248	2,088	334	916	−9.3%
13	Tijuana	7,614	1,533	50	846	−4.2%
14	Querétaro	5,415	2,167	179	677	+26.3%
15	Atlas	5,888	1,364	327	654	−1.7%
16	Necaxa	5,048	1,432	207	561	+2.2%
17	UNAM	3,864	563	142	429	+7.3%
18	Puebla	3,781	659	297	424	−11.9%
19	Veracruz	2,154	298	95	239	−5.5%
	League total	380,355	26,531	50	2,224	+21.9%

Updated to games played on 11 November 2019
Source: Liga MX Femenil
Notes:
Only regular season listed
1: New team.

==== Highest and lowest ====
Highest attendance					Lowest attendance			
Week	Home	Score	Away	Attendance	Home	Score	Away	Attendance
1	UANL	2–1	Guadalajara	14,935	Veracruz	2–2	Querétaro	298
2	Pachuca	1–0	Necaxa	5,400	Querétaro	2–1	León	240
3	Atlético San Luis	0–0	América	17,113	Veracruz	2–0	Atlas	246
4	UANL	0–0	UNAM	14,415	Querétaro	1–0	Santos Laguna	620
5	Atlético San Luis	2–1	Veracruz	7,840	Puebla	3–1	Juárez	300
6	UANL	4–0	Puebla	12,846	Veracruz	1–0	León	297
7 (Note: Round scheduled for midweek.)	Monterrey	2–1	Juárez	2,046	Tijuana	4–2	Santos Laguna	50
8	UANL	3–2	Monterrey	26,531	Veracruz	0–0	Toluca	187
9	Monterrey	4–1	América	4,189	Querétaro	0–3	Pachuca	511
10	UANL	4–0	Atlético San Luis	15,669	Querétaro	1–1	Tijuana	179
11	Pachuca	3–2	UANL	4,621	Veracruz	0–1	Santos Laguna	176
12	UANL	2–0	Tijuana	11,053	UNAM	2–0	Atlético San Luis	142
13	Atlético San Luis	1–2	León	2,008	Necaxa	0–1	Querétaro	207
14	UANL	4–0	Necaxa	8,538	Puebla	1–1	Tijuana	297
15	Atlas	1–1	Guadalajara	1,364	Monterrey	2–0	Cruz Azul	424
16	UANL	1–0	León	6,324	Santos Laguna	1–1	Atlético San Luis	334
17	UANL	2–1	América	12,123	Veracruz	3–1	Juárez	95
18	Atlético San Luis	0–3	Pachuca	2,875	Veracruz	1–0	Necaxa	115
19	Pachuca	1–2	Guadalajara	8,923	Cruz Azul	2–2	Tijuana	311

Source: Liga MX Femenil

=== Liguilla ===
The eight best teams play two games against each other on a home-and-away basis. The higher seeded teams play on their home field during the second leg. The winner of each match up is determined by aggregate score. In the quarterfinals and semifinals, if the two teams are tied on aggregate and on away goals, the higher seeded team advances. In the final, if the two teams are tied after both legs, the match goes to extra time and, if necessary, a penalty shoot-out.

Quarter-finals
1	Monterrey	0	1	1
8	Atlas	0	0	0
4	América	2	1	3
5	Guadalajara	0	0	0
2	UANL	0	3	3
7	Tijuana	0	0	0
3	Pachuca	4	1	5
6	Toluca	1	2	3

Semi-finals
1	Monterrey	2	2	4
4	América	2	1	3
2	UANL	1	4	5
3	Pachuca	3	0	3

Final
1	Monterrey	1	1	2
2	UANL	1	0	1

==== Quarter-finals ====
The first legs were played on 14 and 15 November, and the second legs were played on 17 and 18 November 2019.

Team 1	Agg.	Team 2	1st leg	2nd leg
Monterrey	1–0	Atlas	0–0	1–0
UANL	3–0	Tijuana	0–0	3–0
Pachuca	5–3	Toluca	4–1	1–2
América	3–0	Guadalajara	2–0	1–0

All times are UTC−6 except for matches in Tijuana.

===== First leg =====
14 November 2019	Atlas	0–0	Monterrey	Guadalajara
15:45		Report		Stadium: Estadio Jalisco; Attendance: 1,178; Referee: Itzel Hernández Fuentes

14 November 2019	Tijuana	0–0	UANL	Tijuana
19:00		Report		Stadium: Estadio Caliente; Attendance: 4,333; Referee: Joaquín Alberto Vizcarra Armenta

15 November 2019	Toluca	1–4	Pachuca	Toluca
17:00	Abud 36'	Report	Salazar 18', 35'; Madrid 66'; López 83'	Stadium: Estadio Nemesio Díez; Attendance: 2,929; Referee: Francia Maria Gonzalez Martinez

15 November 2019	Guadalajara	0–2	América	Zapopan
21:00		Report	Espinosa 1'; Muñoz 26'	Stadium: Estadio Akron; Attendance: 10,291; Referee: Priscila Eritzel Pérez Borja

===== Second leg =====
17 November 2019	UANL	3–0 (3–0 agg.)	Tijuana	San Nicolás de los Garza
19:00	Ovalle 59'; Zapata 68' (own); Martínez 81'	Report		Stadium: Estadio Universitario; Attendance: 25,621; Referee: Karen Hernández Andrade

18 November 2019	América	1–0 (3–0 agg.)	Guadalajara	Mexico City
15:45	Espinosa 39'	Report		Stadium: Cancha Centenario No. 5 Club América; Attendance: 985; Referee: Katia Itzel García Mendoza

18 November 2019	Monterrey	1–0 (1–0 agg.)	Atlas	Guadalupe
19:00	Evangelista 48'	Report		Stadium: Estadio BBVA; Attendance: 14,106; Referee: Lizzet Amairany García Olvera

18 November 2019	Pachuca	1–2 (5–3 agg.)	Toluca	Pachuca
21:00	Salazar 41'	Report	Abud 50'; Román 59'	Stadium: Estadio Hidalgo; Attendance: 3,334; Referee: Diana Stephanía Pérez Borja

==== Semi-finals ====
The first legs were played on 21 and 22 November, and the second legs were played on 24 and 25 November 2019.

Team 1	Agg.	Team 2	1st leg	2nd leg
Monterrey	4–3	América	2–2	2–1
UANL	5–3	Pachuca	1–3	4–0

===== First leg =====
21 November 2019	Pachuca	3–1	UANL	Pachuca
19:00	Ocampo 54'; Ángeles 58', 82'	Report	Elizondo 12'	Stadium: Estadio Hidalgo; Attendance: 11,177; Referee: Lizzet Amairany García Olvera

22 November 2019	América	2–2	Monterrey	Mexico City
15:45	Valera 9'; Espinosa 52'	Report	Bernal 72'; Avilez 90'	Stadium: Cancha Centenario No. 5 Club América; Attendance: 877; Referee: Diana Stephanía Pérez Borja

===== Second leg =====
24 November 2019	UANL	4–0 (5–3 agg.)	Pachuca	San Nicolás de los Garza
17:00	Martínez 24'; Rangel 44', 81'; Santellán 47' (own)	Report		Stadium: Estadio Universitario; Attendance: 33,201; Referee: Priscila Eritzel Pérez Borja

25 November 2019	Monterrey	2–1 (4–3 agg.)	América	Guadalupe
20:00	Valdez 12'; Gutiérrez 19' (own)	Report	Cuevas 46'	Stadium: Estadio BBVA; Attendance: 23,915; Referee: Katia Itzel García Mendoza

==== Final ====
The first leg was played on November 29, 2019, and the second leg was played on December 7, 2019.

Team 1	Agg.	Team 2	1st leg	2nd leg
Monterrey	2–1	UANL	1–1	1–0

===== First leg =====
29 November 2019	UANL	1–1	Monterrey	San Nicolás de los Garza
21:05	Cruz 5'	Report	Mejía 53'	Stadium: Estadio Universitario; Attendance: 41,615; Referee: Priscila Eritzel Pérez Borja

===== Second leg =====
7 December 2019	Monterrey	1-0 (2-1 agg.)	UANL	Guadalupe
17:00	Evangelista 31'	Report		Stadium: Estadio BBVA; Attendance: 38,251; Referee: Karen Hernández Andrade

== Torneo Clausura ==
The Clausura 2020 season began on 4 January 2020. This tournament was played with only 18 teams due to the disaffiliation of Veracruz.

On 15 March 2020, the Mexican Football Federation suspended the Clausura seasons of Liga MX, Ascenso MX and Liga MX Femenil indefinitely due to the coronavirus pandemic.

On 22 May 2020 the season was cancelled due to the COVID-19 pandemic. No champion was crowned.

=== Standings ===
Pos	Team	Pld	W	D	L	GF	GA	GD	Pts
1	UANL	8	7	1	0	22	5	+17	22
2	Atlas	9	7	1	1	18	7	+11	22
3	Guadalajara	10	5	3	2	16	10	+6	18
4	Monterrey	8	5	2	1	15	9	+6	17
5	América	9	5	2	2	16	11	+5	17
6	Pachuca	9	5	1	3	18	9	+9	16
7	León	9	5	1	3	18	12	+6	16
8	Cruz Azul	10	4	4	2	11	8	+3	16
9	UNAM	9	3	5	1	12	11	+1	14
10	Tijuana	9	4	1	4	15	13	+2	13
11	Morelia	10	4	1	5	14	12	+2	13
12	Puebla	10	3	2	5	9	9	0	11
13	Necaxa	9	2	3	4	10	17	−7	9
14	Atlético San Luis	9	2	2	5	9	19	−10	8
15	Toluca	10	2	1	7	7	18	−11	7
16	Juárez	9	1	3	5	7	15	−8	6
17	Querétaro	10	0	3	7	5	27	−22	3
18	Santos Laguna	9	0	2	7	8	18	−10	2

Updated to match(es) played on 15 March 2020. Source: Liga MX Femenil
Rules for classification: 1) Points; 2) Goal difference; 3) Number of goals scored; 4) Head-to-head results between tied teams; 5) Number of goals scored away; 6) Highest relegation coefficient; 7) Fair Play points

=== Positions by Round ===
Leader and qualification to liguilla
Qualification to liguilla
Last place in table

Team ╲ Round	1	2	3	4	5	6	7	8	9
UANL (Note: A pending match between weeks 1 and 19)	11	9	7	6	4	2	2	2	1
Atlas	1	1	2	1	1	3	3	1	2
Monterrey (Note: A pending match between weeks 1 and 15)	10	8	6	4	3	4	4	4	3
América	3	2	1	2	2	1	1	3	4
Pachuca	6	6	13	8	5	5	7	5	5
Guadalajara	9	12	5	3	6	8	5	6	6
Cruz Azul	8	13	15	12	13	14	9	7	7
León (Note: A pending match between weeks 7 and 15)	13	18	18	16	13	11	13	10	8
Tijuana	4	4	14	15	12	12	14	12	9
UNAM	17	11	11	7	7	9	10	8	10
Puebla	2	3	3	5	9	7	6	9	11
Morelia	7	5	12	11	10	6	8	11	12
Necaxa	18	15	10	10	8	10	11	13	13
Atlético San Luis	5	7	4	9	11	13	12	14	14
Toluca	14	10	8	13	15	16	16	15	15
Juárez	15	17	9	14	16	15	15	16	16
Querétaro	16	16	17	18	18	18	18	18	17
Santos Laguna	12	14	16	17	17	17	17	17	18

Updated to match(es) played on 2 March 2020. Source: Liga MX Femenil

=== Results ===
Teams play every other team once (either at home or away), completing a total of 17 rounds.

Home \ Away	AME	ATL	ASL	CAZ	GUA	JUA	LEO	MON	MOR	NEC	PAC	PUE	QUE	SAN	TIJ	TOL	UNL	UNM
América	—	—	—	—	—	3–0	—	—	—	—	—	—	4–1	3–2	—	0–1	—	—
Atlas	—	—	—	—	—	2–1	—	—	3–2	—	—	—	4–0	1–0	2–2	—	—	—
Atlético San Luis	—	—	—	—	0–2	—	—	—	1–3	—	—	—	—	3–1	—	—	1–6	1–2
Cruz Azul	1–2	0–1	0–0	—	—	—	—	—	—	1–0	—	—	—	3–1	—	—	—	—
Guadalajara	—	0–2	—	2–2	—	—	4–3	—	—	—	0–1	—	—	—	—	2–0	—	—
Juárez	—	—	—	1–1	0–0	—	—	0–0	—	—	0–3	—	—	—	—	—	—	—
León	—	—	3–0	—	—	—	—	—	0–0	—	—	—	—	—	—	5–1	0–1	—
Monterrey	—	—	—	—	—	—	2–3	—	—	—	2–1	2–1	—	—	3–1	—	—	—
Morelia	1–2	—	—	0–1	—	—	—	—	—	1–2	—	—	—	1–0	—	2–0	—	—
Necaxa	1–1	0–3	—	—	—	—	—	—	—	—	—	—	—	—	0–2	—	1–4	—
Pachuca	—	—	1–2	—	—	—	3–1	—	—	—	—	—	5–0	—	—	—	—	1–1
Puebla	—	—	1–1	—	0–1	—	0–1	—	—	0–1	—	—	1–1	—	—	—	0–2	—
Querétaro	—	—	—	—	—	0–2	—	0–2	0–3	3–3	—	—	—	—	—	—	—	0–0
Santos Laguna	—	—	—	—	1–1	—	1–2	—	—	2–2	—	—	—	—	—	—	—	0–2
Tijuana	3–0	—	—	—	1–4	2–0	—	—	—	—	—	0–2	3–0	—	—	—	—	—
Toluca	—	—	—	1–2	—	—	—	1–2	—	—	0–2	0–1	—	—	2–1	—	—	—
UANL	—	2–0	—	—	—	—	—	—	3–1	—	3–1	—	—	—	—	1–1	—	—
UNAM	1–1	—	—	0–0	—	4–3	—	2–2	—	—	—	0–3	—	—	—	—	—	—

Updated to match(es) played on 15 March 2020. Source: Liga MX Femenil
Legend: Blue = home team win; Yellow = draw; Red = away team win.

=== Regular season statistics ===
==== Top goalscorers ====
Players sorted first by goals scored, then by last name.

Rank	Player	Club	Goals
1	(Mexico) Stephany Mayor	UANL	6
1	(Mexico) Fabiola Ibarra	Atlas	6
1	(Mexico) Desirée Monsiváis	Monterrey	6
1	(Mexico) Viridiana Salazar	Pachuca	6
5	(Mexico) Katty Martínez	UANL	5
5	(Mexico) Marlyn Campa	América	5
5	(Mexico) Renae Cuéllar	Tijuana	5
8	(Mexico) Ana Paola López	Pachuca	4
8	(Mexico) Yashira Barrientos	Guadalajara	4
8	(Mexico) Claudia Cid	León	4
8	(Mexico) Diana García	León	4
8	(Mexico) Dulce Alvarado	Necaxa	4
8	(Mexico) Daniela Carrandi	Atlético San Luis	4
8	(Mexico) Mariel Román	Toluca	4
8	(Mexico) Atzimba Casas	Juárez	4

Source: Liga MX Femenil

==== Hat-tricks ====
Player	For	Against	Result	Date	Round	Reference
(Mexico) Renae Cuéllar	Tijuana	Querétaro	3–0 (H)	6 January 2020	1	
(Mexico) Fabiola Ibarra	Atlas	Querétaro	4–0 (H)	25 January 2020	4	
(Mexico) Stephany Mayor	UANL	Atlético San Luis	1–6 (A)	24 February 2020	8	
(Mexico) Lizette Rodríguez	Morelia	Querétaro	0–3 (A)	13 March 2020	10	

(H) – Home; (A) – Away

=== Attendance ===
==== Per team ====
Pos	Team	Total	High	Low	Average	Change
1	UANL	44,271	18,369	7,950	11,068	−18.6%
2	Atlético San Luis	36,578	17,131	2,370	7,316	+6.4%
3	UNAM	25,342	22,289	485	5,068	+1,081.4%
4	Pachuca	10,702	3,328	2,428	2,676	−49.5%
5	Guadalajara	10,614	6,011	976	2,654	+75.9%
6	Juárez	8,635	4,709	1,146	2,159	+13.8%
7	Monterrey	7,556	3,376	580	1,889	−34.9%
8	Puebla	8,418	4,100	554	1,684	+297.2%
9	Morelia	8,232	3,087	1,200	1,646	+31.7%
10	Tijuana	8,165	3,733	633	1,633	+93.0%
11	Santos Laguna	4,097	2,452	283	1,271	+38.8%
12	Cruz Azul	5,497	2,563	489	1,099	+13.2%
13	Necaxa	3,931	1,465	349	983	+75.2%
14	Toluca	3,857	1,064	484	771	−28.1%
15	León	2,598	1,585	175	650	−42.4%
16	América	2,502	826	516	626	−47.2%
17	Atlas	2,364	827	114	473	−27.7%
18	Querétaro	2,149	649	260	430	−36.5%
	League total	195,508	22,289	114	2,414	+8.5%

Updated to games played on 14 March 2020
Source: Liga MX Femenil
Notes:
Only regular season listed

==== Highest and lowest ====
Highest attendance					Lowest attendance			
Week	Home	Score	Away	Attendance	Home	Score	Away	Attendance
1	Atlético San Luis	3–1	Santos Laguna	3,487	Necaxa	0–3	Atlas	349
2	Atlético San Luis	1–2	UNAM	5,890	Atlas	3–2	Morelia	527
3	UANL	1–1	Toluca	7,150	América	3–2	Santos Laguna	516
4	Atlético San Luis	0–2	Guadalajara	17,131	León	0–0	Morelia	431
5	UANL	2–0	Atlas	18,369	León	5–1	Toluca	175
6	Santos Laguna	1–1	Guadalajara	2,452	Atlas	2–2	Tijuana	337
7	UANL	3–1	Pachuca	9,531	Atlas	2–1	Juárez	114
8	Atlético San Luis	1–6	UANL	7,700	Santos Laguna	1–2	León	283
9	UANL	3–1	Morelia	8,421	Querétaro	0–0	UNAM	371
10 (Note: Only two games were played with supporters assistance due to precautionary measures against the COVID-19 pandemic)	UNAM	0–0	Cruz Azul	22,289	Querétaro	0–3	Morelia	260

Source: Liga MX Femenil

=== Liguilla ===
The eight best teams play two games against each other on a home-and-away basis. The higher seeded teams play on their home field during the second leg. The winner of each match up is determined by aggregate score. In the quarterfinals and semifinals, if the two teams are tied on aggregate and on away goals, the higher seeded team advances. In the final, if the two teams are tied after both legs, the match goes to extra time and, if necessary, a penalty shoot-out.

Camp Camp 2019-20 Ciub Football Monterrey Apertura 2019 Ciub Football America Clausura 2020

== See also ==
- 2019–20 Liga MX season
- 2019–20 Ascenso MX season
