= 2017–18 Toluca FC (women) season =

Toluca
2017–18 season
- Chairman: Francisco Suinaga
- Manager: Juan Carlos Mendoza
- Stadium: Estadio Nemesio Díez
- Apertura: 6th
- Clausura: Semifinals (5th)
- Top goalscorer: Natalia Mauleón (17 goals)
- Biggest win: Toluca 4–0 Pachuca (27 October 2017)
- Biggest defeat: Toluca 0–3 Pachuca (19 February 2018)
Home colours	Away colours

The 2017–18 season was Toluca's first competitive season and first season in the Liga MX Femenil, Mexican women's footballs highest league.

On the Apertura 2017 tournament, Toluca failed to qualify for the playoffs, managing to do so for the Clausura 2018, where they lost at the semifinals against Monterrey.

== Squad ==
=== Apertura ===
No.	Nat.	Name	Date of birth (age)	Since
Goalkeepers
1	(Mexico)	Mariel Godínez	30 July 1997 (aged 19)	2017
12	(Mexico)	Wendy Gallardo	27 May 1998 (aged 19)	2017
22	(Mexico)	Dayan Téllez	11 February 2002 (aged 15)	2017
Defenders
2	(Mexico)	Dirce Delgado (Captain)	29 August 1986 (aged 30)	2017
3	(Mexico)	Daniela Gómez	29 August 1995 (aged 21)	2017
4	(Mexico)	Sahori Islas	23 April 1994 (aged 23)	2017
5	(Mexico)	Paloma Gutiérrez	5 August 1994 (aged 22)	2017
13	(Mexico)	Miriam Beltrán	19 February 1998 (aged 19)	2017
15	(Mexico)	Sara Reyna	19 September 1999 (aged 17)	2017
23	(Mexico)	Deborah Romero	10 January 1997 (aged 20)	2017
24	(Mexico)	Francesca Martínez	27 January 2003 (aged 14)	2017
28	(Mexico)	Paola Ayala	9 June 1997 (aged 20)	2017
Midfielders
6	(Mexico)	Diana Pineda	24 December 1994 (aged 22)	2017
7	(Mexico)	Andrea Hernández	20 January 1998 (aged 19)	2017
10	(Mexico)	Gabriela González	25 April 1989 (aged 28)	2017
16	(Mexico)	Evelin Aparicio	14 September 1998 (aged 18)	2017
17	(Mexico)	Edna Perea	6 September 2000 (aged 16)	2017
18	(Mexico)	Miroslaba Chávez	20 February 1996 (aged 21)	2017
26	(Mexico)	Shajaru Meis	17 June 1998 (aged 19)	2017
27	(Mexico)	Liliana Rodríguez	27 February 1996 (aged 21)	2017
29	(Mexico)	Carolina Miranda	10 May 1995 (aged 22)	2017
Forwards
8	(Mexico)	Daniela Enríquez	1 April 1996 (aged 21)	2017
9	(Mexico)	Kenya Téllez	6 June 1996 (aged 21)	2017
11	(Mexico)	Mayte Wuaustorf	8 September 1997 (aged 19)	2017
14	(Mexico)	Natalia Mauleón	4 February 2002 (aged 15)	2017
19	(Mexico)	Karla López	23 May 1995 (aged 22)	2017
21	(Mexico)	Alejandra Zaragoza	16 March 1999 (aged 18)	2017

=== Clausura ===
No.	Nat.	Name	Date of birth (age)	Since
Goalkeepers
1	(Mexico)	Alondra Ubaldo	15 August 2000 (aged 17)	2018
12	(Mexico)	Andrea Rivera	18 January 2001 (aged 16)	2018
22	(Mexico)	Dayan Téllez	11 February 2002 (aged 15)	2017
Defenders
2	(Mexico)	Dirce Delgado (Captain)	29 August 1986 (aged 31)	2017
3	(Mexico)	Daniela Gómez	29 August 1995 (aged 22)	2017
4	(Mexico)	Sahori Islas	23 April 1994 (aged 23)	2017
5	(Mexico)	Anakaren Llamas	11 March 1993 (aged 24)	2018
13	(Mexico)	Karla Zempoalteca	18 May 2000 (aged 17)	2018
15	(Mexico)	Sara Reyna	19 September 1999 (aged 18)	2017
23	(Mexico)	Deborah Romero	10 January 1997 (aged 20)	2017
28	(Mexico)	Paola Ayala	9 June 1997 (aged 20)	2017
Midfielders
6	(Mexico)	Alexa Crisosto	6 November 2001 (aged 16)	2018
7	(Mexico)	Andrea Hernández (Vice-captain)	20 January 1998 (aged 19)	2017
8	(Mexico)	Ivonne Gutiérrez	14 December 2002 (aged 15)	2018
16	(Mexico)	Evelin Aparicio	14 September 1998 (aged 19)	2017
17	(Mexico)	Edna Perea	6 September 2000 (aged 17)	2017
18	(Mexico)	Miroslaba Chávez	20 February 1996 (aged 21)	2017
26	(Mexico)	Shajaru Meis	17 June 1998 (aged 19)	2017
27	(Mexico)	Liliana Rodríguez	27 February 1996 (aged 21)	2017
29	(Mexico)	Carolina Miranda	10 May 1995 (aged 22)	2017
Forwards
9	(Mexico)	Kenya Téllez	6 June 1996 (aged 21)	2017
10	(Mexico)	Zamira Manzur	19 April 2003 (aged 14)	2018
11	(Mexico)	Mayte Wuaustorf	8 September 1997 (aged 20)	2017
14	(Mexico)	Natalia Mauleón	4 February 2002 (aged 15)	2017
19	(Mexico)	Karla López	23 May 1995 (aged 22)	2017

== Transfers ==
=== In ===
Pos.	Player	Moving from	Transfer window	Ref.
DF	(Mexico) Anakaren Llamas	América	Winter	
DF	(Mexico) Karla Zempoalteca	Pachuca	Winter	

=== Out ===
Pos.	Player	Moving to	Transfer window	Ref.
GK	(Mexico) Wendy Gallardo	Necaxa	Winter	

== Coaching staff ==
Position	Staff
Manager	(Mexico) Juan Carlos Mendoza
Fitness coaches	(Mexico) Gloria Rangel
Fitness coaches	(Mexico) Rafael Maldonado
Doctor	(Mexico) Jessica Tenorio
Medical assistant	(Mexico) Andrea Fabela
Kit manager	(Mexico) María Lezama

== Competitions ==
=== Overview ===
Competition	First match	Last match	Starting round	Final position	Record							
Competition	First match	Last match	Starting round	Final position	Pld	W	D	L	GF	GA	GD	Win %
Apertura	28 July 2017	27 October 2017	Matchday 1	6th	14	8	2	4	26	16	+10	57.14
Clausura	6 January 2018	23 April 2018	Matchday 1	Semifinals	16	9	3	4	23	17	+6	56.25
Total					30	17	5	8	49	33	+16	56.67

Source: Competitions

=== Torneo Apertura ===
==== League table ====
Pos	Team	Pld	W	D	L	GF	GA	GD	Pts	Qualification or relegation
4	Monterrey	14	10	1	3	38	17	+21	31	
5	Pachuca	14	9	3	2	36	16	+20	30	Advance to Liguilla (Note: The two best teams of each group advance to the semifinals of the Liguilla.)
6	Toluca	14	8	2	4	26	16	+10	26	
7	UNAM	14	5	6	3	24	15	+9	21	
8	Atlas	14	6	2	6	24	29	−5	20	

Source: Liga MX Femenil
Rules for classification: 1) Points; 2) Goal difference; 3) Number of goals scored; 4) Number of away goals scored; 5) Head-to-head results between tied teams; 6) Drawing of lots

==== Matches ====
28 July 2017 1	Toluca	2–1	Cruz Azul	Metepec, State of Mexico
12:00	Rodríguez 15' (pen.); Romero 86'	Report	Dávila 43'	Stadium: Metepec Training Center; Referee: Luis Gerardo García

5 August 2017 2	UNAM	1–1	Toluca	Coyoacán, Mexico City
16:00	Gómez 30'	Report	Mauleón 4'	Stadium: La Cantera; Attendance: Blanca de Lira

11 August 2017 3	Toluca	1–2	América	Toluca, State of Mexico
12:00	Mauleón 62'	Report	C. Cuevas 12'; L. Cuevas 21'	Stadium: Estadio Nemesio Díez; Referee: Alfredo Medina

19 August 2017 4	Veracruz	2–3	Toluca	Boca del Río, Veracruz
9:00	Cornejo 2'; Fortis 40'	Report	Mauleón 1', 21', 90'	Stadium: Estadio Luis "Pirata" Fuente; Attendance: Víctor Manuel Ortiz

25 August 2017 5	Toluca	0–2	Morelia	Metepec, State of Mexico
12:00		Report	Jiménez 65'; Fuentes 75'	Stadium: Metepec Training Center; Referee: Priscila Pérez

1 September 2017 6	Toluca	4–0	Tijuana	Toluca, State of Mexico
12:00	Waustorf 22', 50'; López 70'; Perea 81'	Report		Stadium: Estadio Nemesio Díez; Referee: Oscar Toledo

11 September 2017 7	Pachuca	0–2	Toluca	Pachuca, Hidalgo
19:00		Report	Mauleón 10'; Miranda 77'	Stadium: Estadio Hidalgo; Attendance: Guillermo Pacheco

15 September 2017 8	Cruz Azul	0–1	Toluca	Xochimilco, Mexico City
10:00		Report	Islas 83'	Stadium: La Noria; Attendance: Víctor Cáceres

30 September 2017 10	América	3–0	Toluca	Coyoacán, Mexico City
16:00	Cázares 9'; L. Cuevas 16'; Espinosa 57'	Report		Stadium: Club América; Referee: Iván Rodríguez

6 October 2017 11	Toluca	3–0	Veracruz	Metepec, State of Mexico
12:00	K. Téllez 26'; García 57' (o.g.); Mauleón 80'	Report		Stadium: Metepec Training Center; Referee: Quetzalli Alvarado

14 October 2017 12	Morelia	0–2	Toluca	Morelia, Michoacán
12:30		Report	K. Téllez 69'; López 90+2'	Stadium: Estadio Morelos; Referee: Alan Martínez

18 October 2017 9	Toluca	1–3	UNAM	Metepec, State of Mexico
12:00	Miranda 85'	Report	Abud 11'; López 65'; Hernández 75'	Stadium: Metepec Training Center; Referee: Alan López

21 October 2017 12	Tijuana	2–2	Toluca	Tijuana, Baja California
16:00	Aguiar 23', 43'	Report	Mauleón 74'; K. Téllez 77'	Stadium: Estadio Caliente; Referee: Ismael López

27 October 2017 14	Toluca	4–0	Pachuca	Metepec, State of Mexico
12:00	Mauleón 17', 75' (pen.); K. Téllez 59'; Hernández 77'	Report		Stadium: Metepec Training Center; Referee: Aldo Ballesteros

=== Torneo Apertura ===
==== League table ====
Pos	Team	Pld	W	D	L	GF	GA	GD	Pts	Qualification or relegation
3	UANL (C)	14	10	1	3	38	16	+22	31	Advance to Liguilla (Note: The two best teams of each group advance to the semifinals of the Liguilla.)
4	Guadalajara	14	9	2	3	30	13	+17	29	
5	Toluca	14	9	2	3	22	13	+9	29	Advance to Liguilla
6	Pachuca	14	9	1	4	32	13	+19	28	
7	UNAM	14	7	3	4	18	7	+11	24	

Source: Liga MX Femenil
Rules for classification: 1) Points; 2) Goal difference; 3) Number of goals scored; 4) Number of away goals scored; 5) Head-to-head results between tied teams; 6) Drawing of lots
(C) Champions

==== Matches ====
6 January 2018 1	América	1–2	Toluca	Tlalpan, Mexico City
16:00	C. Cuevas 90+1'	Report	C. Miranda 50'; Mauleón 70'	Stadium: Estadio Azteca; Referee: Blanca de Lira

15 January 2018 2	Toluca	1–1	Cruz Azul	Toluca, State of Mexico
16:00	C. Miranda 11'	Report	Rodríguez 68'	Stadium: Estadio Nemesio Díez; Referee: Luis Gerardo García

22 January 2018 3	Tijuana	1–2	Toluca	Tijuana, Baja California
19:00	García 30'	Report	M. Miranda 35'; C. Miranda 65'	Stadium: Estadio Caliente; Referee: Mario Alberto Nava

29 January 2018 4	Toluca	3–0	Morelia	Toluca, State of Mexico
16:00	López 29'; Rodríguez 53'; Mauleón 75'	Report		Stadium: Estadio Nemesio Díez; Referee: Ricardo Herrera

3 February 2018 5	UNAM	1–2	Toluca	Coyoacán, Mexico City
12:00	Velázquez 11'	Report	López 74'; Rodríguez 87'	Stadium: La Cantera; Referee: Miguel Ángel Anaya

10 February 2018 6	Veracruz	0–1	Toluca	Boca del Río, Veracruz
17:30		Report	C. Miranda 56'	Stadium: Estadio Luis "Pirata" Fuente; Referee: Víctor Manuel Ortiz

19 February 2018 7	Toluca	0–3	Pachuca	Toluca, State of Mexico
18:00		Report	Ocampo 2', 87', 90'	Stadium: Estadio Nemesio Díez; Referee: Arturo Alcántara

26 February 2018 8	Toluca	1–1	América	Toluca, State of Mexico
18:00	K. Téllez 88'	Report	C. Cuevas 55'	Stadium: Estadio Nemesio Díez; Referee: Luis Daniel Chávez

2 March 2018 9	Cruz Azul	0–1	Toluca	Xochimilco, Mexico City
16:00		Report	Mauleón 37'	Stadium: La Noria; Referee: Arturo González

12 March 2018 10	Toluca	3–0	Tijuana	Toluca, State of Mexico
18:00	Mauleón 12'; C. Miranda 38'; Hernández 90+1'	Report		Stadium: Estadio Nemesio Díez; Referee: Mario Terrazas

19 March 2018 11	Morelia	1–3	Toluca	Morelia, Michoacán
16:00	Molina 34'	Report	Mauleón 5', 41'; K. Téllez 84'	Stadium: Estadio Morelos; Referee: Vicente Reynoso

26 March 2018 12	Toluca	0–1	UNAM	Toluca, State of Mexico
18:00		Report	Llamas 51' (o.g.)	Stadium: Estadio Nemesio Díez; Referee: Gustavo Padilla

2 April 2018 13	Toluca	2–0	Veracruz	Toluca, State of Mexico
18:00	Mauleón 37'; C. Miranda 41' (pen.)	Report		Stadium: Estadio Nemesio Díez; Referee: Antonio de Jesús Olalde

19 March 2018 14	Pachuca	3–1	Toluca	Pachuca, Hidalgo
16:00	Salazar 10' (pen.), 77'; Franco 62'	Report	C. Miranda 28'	Stadium: Estadio Hidalgo; Referee: Ricardo Norman

==== Playoffs ====
===== Semifinals =====
15 April 2018 First leg	Toluca	0–0	Monterrey	Toluca, State of Mexico
18:00		Report		Stadium: Estadio Nemesio Díez; Referee: Francia González

23 April 2018 Second leg	Monterrey	4–1 (4–1 agg.)	Toluca	Guadalupe, Nuevo León
19:00	Evangelista 11', 68'; Monsiváis 52'; Castillo 90+3'	Report	K. Téllez 20'	Stadium: Estadio BBVA Bancomer; Referee: Mario Terrazas

== Statistics ==
=== Appearances and goals ===
No.	Pos	Nat	Player	Total		Apertura		Clausura	
No.	Pos	Nat	Player	Apps	Goals	Apps	Goals	Apps	Goals
1	GK	(Mexico) MEX	Alondra Ubaldo	18	0	11	0	7	0
2	DF	(Mexico) MEX	Dirce Delgado	28	0	14	0	14	0
3	DF	(Mexico) MEX	Daniela Gómez	26	0	12	0	14	0
4	DF	(Mexico) MEX	Sahori Islas	24	1	11	1	13	0
5	DF	(Mexico) MEX	Anakaren Llamas	14	0	0	0	14	0
6	MF	(Mexico) MEX	Alexa Crisosto	4	0	0	0	4	0
7	MF	(Mexico) MEX	Andrea Hernández	27	2	14	1	13	1
8	MF	(Mexico) MEX	Ivonne Gutiérrez	1	0	0	0	1	0
9	FW	(Mexico) MEX	Kenya Téllez	30	7	14	4	16	3
10	FW	(Mexico) MEX	Zamira Manzur	1	0	0	0	1	0
11	FW	(Mexico) MEX	Maritza Miranda	15	1	0	0	15	1
12	GK	(Mexico) MEX	Andrea Rivera	1	0	0	0	1	0
13	DF	(Mexico) MEX	Karla Zempoalteca	11	0	0	0	11	0
14	FW	(Mexico) MEX	Natalia Mauleón	27	17	14	10	13	7
15	DF	(Mexico) MEX	Sara Reyna	4	0	3	0	1	0
16	MF	(Mexico) MEX	Evelin Aparicio	10	0	5	0	5	0
17	MF	(Mexico) MEX	Edna Perea	14	1	9	1	5	0
18	MF	(Mexico) MEX	Miroslaba Chávez	15	0	9	0	6	0
19	FW	(Mexico) MEX	Karla López	22	4	8	2	14	2
21	FW	(Mexico) MEX	Alejandra Zaragoza	4	0	4	0	0	0
22	GK	(Mexico) MEX	Dayan Téllez	8	0	0	0	8	0
23	DF	(Mexico) MEX	Deborah Romero	15	1	13	1	2	0
26	MF	(Mexico) MEX	Shajaru Meis	24	0	9	0	15	0
27	MF	(Mexico) MEX	Liliana Rodríguez	28	3	13	1	15	2
28	DF	(Mexico) MEX	Paola Ayala	1	0	1	0	0	0
29	MF	(Mexico) MEX	Carolina Miranda	24	9	8	2	16	7
Players that left the club during the season
6	MF	(Mexico) MEX	Diana Pineda	1	0	1	0	0	0
8	FW	(Mexico) MEX	Daniela Enríquez	2	0	2	0	0	0
10	MF	(Mexico) MEX	Gabriela González	2	0	2	0	0	0
11	FW	(Mexico) MEX	Mayte Wuaustorf	7	2	7	2	0	0
12	GK	(Mexico) MEX	Wendy Gallardo	4	0	4	0	0	0
13	DF	(Mexico) MEX	Miriam Beltrán	4	0	4	0	0	0
24	DF	(Mexico) MEX	Francesca Martínez	1	0	1	0	0	0

=== Goalscorers ===
Rank	Pos.	No.	Player	Apertura	Clausura	Total
1	FW	14	(Mexico) Natalia Mauleón	10	7	17
2	MF	29	(Mexico) Carolina Miranda	2	7	9
3	FW	9	(Mexico) Kenya Téllez	4	3	7
4	FW	19	(Mexico) Karla López	2	2	4
5	MF	27	(Mexico) Liliana Rodríguez	1	2	3
6	MF	7	(Mexico) Andrea Hernández	1	1	2
6	FW	11	(Mexico) Mayte Wuaustorf	2	–	2
8	DF	4	(Mexico) Sahori Islas	1	0	1
8	FW	11	(Mexico) Maritza Miranda	–	1	1
8	MF	17	(Mexico) Edna Perea	1	0	1
8	DF	23	(Mexico) Deborah Romero	1	0	1
Own goals				1	0	1
Total				26	23	49

=== Hat-tricks ===
Player	Against	Result	Date	Competition	Ref.
(Mexico) Natalia Mauleón	Veracruz	3–2 (A)	19 August 2017	Liga MX Femenil	

=== Own goals ===
Player	Against	Result	Date	Competition	Ref.
(Mexico) Anakaren Llamas	UNAM	0–1 (H)	26 March 2018	Liga MX Femenil	
