= Natalia Mauleón =

Mexican footballer (born 2002)

Personal information
- Full name: María Natalia Mauleón Piñón
- Date of birth: 4 February 2002 (age 24)
- Place of birth: Acuitzio, Michoacán, Mexico
- Height: 1.52 m (5 ft 0 in)
- Position: Attacking midfielder

Team information
- Current team: Guadalajara
- Number: 14

Senior career*
Years	Team	Apps	(Gls)
2017–2021	Toluca	96	(33)
2021–2025	América	139	(25)
2025–2026	Pachuca	29	(5)
2026–	Guadalajara	0	(0)

International career^{‡}
2018	Mexico U-17	10	(4)
2022	Mexico U-20	6	(3)
2022–	Mexico	13	(2)
Medal record
Women's football
Representing Mexico
Central American and Caribbean Games
Gold medal – first place	2023 San Salvador
- * Club domestic league appearances and goals as of 13 July 2025 ‡ National team caps and goals as of 13 July 2025

María Natalia Mauleón Piñón (born 4 February 2002) is a Mexican professional footballer who plays as an attacking midfielder for Liga MX Femenil side Guadalajara. Mauleon is also part of the Mexico women's national football team.

== Career ==
Mauleón was born in Acuitzio, Michoacán on 4 February 2002.

Mauleón moved with her family to Tepotzotlán, State of Mexico and was invited by Toluca for trials at the club's facilities in 2017. Afterwards, she signed for Toluca.

== International career ==
Mauleón was part of the Mexico women's national under-17 football team. She participated in the 2018 CONCACAF Women's U-17 Championship, where the Mexican squad were runners-up.

Mauleón was also part of the team that finished as runners-up of the 2018 FIFA U-17 Women's World Cup in Uruguay, losing the final against Spain. Mauleón played all Mexico's six matches, but scored no goals.

== Career statistics ==
=== Club ===
As of match played 19 November 2020

Appearances and goals by club, season and competition
Club	Season	League			Total	
Club	Season	Division	Apps	Goals	Apps	Goals
Toluca	2017–18	Liga MX Femenil	27	17	27	17
Toluca	2018–19	Liga MX Femenil	22	6	22	6
Toluca	2019–20	Liga MX Femenil	16	4	16	4
Toluca	2020–21	Liga MX Femenil	17	2	17	2
Toluca	Total		82	29	82	29
Career total			82	29	82	29

=== International goals ===
No.	Date	Venue	Opponent	Score	Result	Competition
1.	7 July 2023	Estadio Las Delicias, Santa Tecla, El Salvador	Venezuela	2–1	2–1 (a.e.t.)	2023 Central American and Caribbean Games
2.	1 December 2023	Juan Ramón Loubriel Stadium, Bayamón, Puerto Rico	Puerto Rico	1-0	3-0	2024 CONCACAF W Gold Cup qualification

== Honours ==
Club América

- Liga MX Femenil: Clausura 2023

Mexico U-17

- CONCACAF Women's U-17 Championship: Runners-up: 2018
- FIFA U-17 Women's World Cup: Runners-up: 2018
