= Dayan Téllez =

Mexican footballer (born 2002)

Personal information
- Full name: Dayan Téllez Domínguez
- Date of birth: 11 February 2002 (age 24)
- Place of birth: Temoaya, State of Mexico, Mexico
- Height: 1.60 m (5 ft 3 in)
- Position: Goalkeeper

Senior career*
Years	Team	Apps	(Gls)
2017–2021	Toluca	50	(0)

International career
2017	Mexico U17		
- * Club domestic league appearances and goals as of 29 August 2019

Dayan Téllez Domínguez (born 11 February 2002), is a Mexican football goalkeeper who currently plays for Deportivo Toluca of the Liga MX Femenil.

== Club career ==
=== Toluca ===
On 19 August 2017, Téllez made her Liga MX Femenil debut as a 45th-minute substitute against Veracruz. On September 11, Téllez made her consolidation on the first team with a great game against Pachuca in the Hidalgo Stadium where the Red Devils won 0–2, ending up with their unbeaten streak.

== International career ==
On 14 November 2017, Téllez earned her first called up to the Mexico women's under 17 national team.

== Personal life ==
She is the younger sister of striker and teammate Kenya Téllez.

== Career statistics ==
=== Club ===
As of 22 August 2019.

Club statistics
Club	Season	League (Note: Includes Liguilla)			National Cup		Continental		Total	
Club	Season	Division	Apps	Goals	Apps	Goals	Apps	Goals	Apps	Goals
Toluca	2017–18	Liga MX Femenil	18	0	—		—		18	0
Toluca	2018–19	Liga MX Femenil	17	0	—		—		17	0
Toluca	2019–20	Liga MX Femenil	5	0	—		—		5	0
Total			40	0	0	0	0	0	40	0
Career total			40	0	0	0	0	0	40	0
