= Nikkole Teja =

MexicanAmerican soccer player (born 1999)

- Teja in 2024

Personal information
- Full name: Nikkole Cheree Teja
- Date of birth: December 9, 1999 (age 26)
- Place of birth: Seattle, Washington
- Height: 1.63 m (5 ft 4 in)
- Position: Midfielder

Senior career*
Years	Team	Apps	(Gls)
2022–2023	Necaxa	32	(0)
2024	Puebla	0	(0)
- * Club domestic league appearances and goals

Nikkole Cheree Teja (born December 9, 1999) is an American former soccer player who last played as a midfielder for Puebla.

== Early life ==
Born in Seattle, Teja started playing soccer since childhood and played soccer for an American college.

== Club career ==
Teja has played for Mexican side Tuzas del Pachuca. In 2022, Teja became the first foreign player to play for Necaxa. She made nine appearances in her first season as she adapted to the Liga MX Femenil. In 21, June, Necaxa announced her departure from the team.

== Style of play ==
Teja mainly operates as a midfielder.
