= José Julio Cevada =

Mexican football manager

Personal information
- Full name: José Julio Cevada Hernández
- Date of birth: 19 February 1982 (age 44)
- Place of birth: Coyoacán, Mexico City, Mexico
- Height: 1.73 m (5 ft 8 in)

Managerial career
- Years: Team
- 2018–2019: BUAP (women)
- 2021–2023: Monterrey (women) (Assistant)
- 2024: Cruz Azul (women)

José Julio Cevada (born 19 February 1982) is a Mexican football manager.

== Coaching career ==
Cevada started his coaching career managing BUAP (women), from 2018 to 2019. In 2021, Cevada joined the staff team of Eva Espejo in Monterrey (women). In 2024, he was appointed as manager of Cruz Azul (women) in the Liga MX Femenil.
