= Fátima Bracamonte =

Mexican footballer (born 2002)

Personal information
- Full name: Fátima Guadalupe Bracamonte Vargas
- Date of birth: 13 May 2002 (age 24)
- Place of birth: Hermosillo, Sonora, Mexico
- Height: 1.76 m (5 ft 9 in)
- Position: Left back

Team information
- Current team: Necaxa
- Number: 15

Senior career*
Years	Team	Apps	(Gls)
2018–2019	Querétaro	9	(0)
2020–2021	Mazatlán	29	(2)
2022	León	11	(2)
2022–2023	Puebla	25	(4)
2025–	Necaxa	24	(0)
- * Club domestic league appearances and goals as of 9 February 2026 ‡ National team caps and goals as of 12 March 2022

Fátima Guadalupe Bracamonte Vargas (born 13 May 2002) is a Mexican professional footballer who plays as a Left back for Liga MX Femenil side Necaxa.

== Club career ==
In 2018, she started her career in Querétaro. In 2020, she joined Mazatlán. In 2022, she signed with León. ince 2025, she is part of Necaxa.
