= Laura Herrera =

Laura Herrera may refer to:

- Laura Herrera (basketball)
- Laura Herrera (footballer)

== See also ==
- Laura Herrera Scott, American politician and physician
