= Aylín Aviléz =

Mexican footballer (born 2003)

Aylín Avilez
Personal information
- Full name: Aylín Ariana Avilez Peña
- Date of birth: 18 May 2003 (age 23)
- Place of birth: Culiacán, Sinaloa, Mexico
- Height: 1.56 m (5 ft 1 in)
- Positions: Midfielder; forward

Team information
- Current team: América
- Number: 11

Senior career*
Years	Team	Apps	(Gls)
2018–2023	Monterrey	158	(56)
2023–	América	69	(13)

International career^{‡}
2018	Mexico U-15		
2018	Mexico U-17		
2022	Mexico U-20		
2022–	Mexico	2	(0)
- * Club domestic league appearances and goals as of 24 May 2026 ‡ National team caps and goals as of 3 January 2025

Aylín Ariana Avilez Peña (born 18 May 2003) is a Mexican professional footballer who plays as a forward or midfielder for Liga MX Femenil side Club América and the Mexico women's national team.

== Club career ==
Previous to her professional career, Avilez played amateur football in her native Culiacán and in Baja California.

=== Monterrey (2018–2023) ===
In 2018, Liga MX Femenil side Monterrey invited Avilez to a trial to see if she could join the team, but she was not selected. Monterrey eventually signed Avilez on 29 May 2018, after her noteworthy performances with the Mexico U-15 women's national team, as well as being selected to be part of the Mexico U-17 squad that would end up participating in the 2018 CONCACAF Women's U-17 Championship.

Avilez made her professional debut with Monterrey at the age of 15 on 19 August 2018, during a league match against Querétaro as part of the Apertura 2018 tournament. During this match, Avilez also scored her first goal with the club. During her first few years with Monterrey, Avilez was mostly used as a sub. In this form she help her club win the Apertura 2019 title, Monterrey's first. She got a more prominent role with Monterrey after Eva Espejo took over as manager. Under Espejo, Avilez helped her team win the Apertura 2021 tournament and became a more prolific goal scorer. As a result of this, the league awarded Avilez the best young player of the season award for her performances throughout the Liga MX Femenil 2021–22 season.

During her time with Monterrey, Avilez scored 56 goals in 158 official league matches.

=== Club América (2023–present) ===
Avilez signed with Club América on 10 July 2023, after not renewing contract with Monterrey.

In May 2026, Avilez scored in both the semifinals and the final of the CONCACAF W Champions Cup, winning 4–1 win over Gotham FC and then 5–3 over the Washington Spirit to become continental champions.

== International career ==
Avilez has been part of the Mexico women's national team program since the U-15 level. In 2018, Avilez was selected to be part of the Mexico women's national under-17 football team that participated in the 2018 CONCACAF Women's U-17 Championship, where Mexico obtained the second place of the tournament as well as a spot in the 2018 FIFA U-17 Women's World Cup.

Avilez was also part of the Mexico team that finished as runners-up of the 2018 FIFA U-17 Women's World Cup in Uruguay, losing the final against Spain. Avilez played all of Mexico's six matches, but scored no goals.

Avilez made her debut for the senior Mexico women's national team on 10 October 2022 as a 87th-minute substitution in a 1–1 friendly home draw against Chile.

== Career statistics ==
=== Club ===
As of match played 4 June 2023

Appearances and goals by club, season and competition
Club	Season	League			Total	
Club	Season	Division	Apps	Goals	Apps	Goals
Monterrey	2018–19	Liga MX Femenil	23	7	23	7
Monterrey	2019–20	Liga MX Femenil	18	7	18	7
Monterrey	2020–21	Liga MX Femenil	35	12	35	12
Monterrey	2021–22	Liga MX Femenil	42	13	42	13
Monterrey	2022–23	Liga MX Femenil	40	17	40	17
Monterrey	Total		158	56	158	56
Career total			158	56	158	56

== Honours ==
Individual

- Liga MX Femenil 2021–22 season best young player award

Monterrey

- Liga MX Femenil: Apertura 2019, Apertura 2021

Club América

- Liga MX Femenil: Clausura 2026
- Liga MX Femenil: Campeón de Campeonas 2025–2026
- CONCACAF W Champions Cup: 2025–26
