= Lucía Muñóz =

Mexican footballer (born 1996)

Lucia Muñoz
Personal information
- Full name: Lucia Muñoz Sánchez
- Date of birth: 25 April 1996 (age 30)
- Place of birth: Aguascalientes City, Aguascalientes, Mexico
- Height: 1.66 m (5 ft 5 in)
- Position: Centre-back

Senior career*
| Years | Team | Apps | (Gls) |
| 2017–2025 | Necaxa | 201 | (2) |
- * Club domestic league appearances and goals as of 4 June 2023

Lucia Muñoz Sánchez (born 25 April 1996) is a Mexican professional footballer who played as a Centre-back for Liga MX Femenil side Necaxa.

== Career ==
In 2017, she started her career in Necaxa. She is the current captain and the player with most caps in the history of the team.
