= Dulce Martínez =

Mexican footballer (born 1997)

Personal information
- Full name: Dulce Eileen Martínez Morales
- Date of birth: 16 April 1999 (age 27)
- Place of birth: Puebla City, Puebla, Mexico
- Height: 1.59 m (5 ft 3 in)
- Position: Centre-back

Team information
- Current team: Puebla
- Number: 16

Senior career*
Years	Team	Apps	(Gls)
2018–2019	BUAP	30	(1)
2019–	Puebla	193	(5)
- * Club domestic league appearances and goals as of 4 June 2023

Dulce Eileen Martínez Morales (born 16 April 1999) is a Mexican professional footballer who plays as a centre-back for Liga MX Femenil side Puebla.

== Club career ==
In 2018, she started her career in BUAP. In 2019, she was transferred to Puebla.
