= Magaly Cortés =

Mexican footballer (born 1994)

Personal information
- Full name: Magaly Cortés Hernández
- Date of birth: 20 July 1994 (age 32)
- Place of birth: Xalapa, Veracruz, Mexico
- Height: 1.67 m (5 ft 6 in)
- Position: Forward

Senior career*
Years	Team	Apps	(Gls)
2018–2019	Veracruz	30	(3)
2020	Toluca	5	(0)
2020–2021	Mazatlán	31	(4)
2021–2022	Cruz Azul	31	(8)
2022–2023	Mazatlán	30	(5)
2023–2024	Querétaro	40	(5)
2025	Mazatlán	15	(1)
- * Club domestic league appearances and goals as of 4 June 2023

Magaly Cortés Hernández (born 20 July 1994) is a Mexican professional footballer who plays as a Forward.

== Career ==
In 2018, she started her career in Veracruz. In 2020 she joined Mazatlán. In 2021 she signed with Cruz Azul.
