= Johana Rosas =

Mexican footballer (born 1995)

Personal information
- Full name: Johana Esperanza Rosas Aguirre
- Date of birth: 15 November 1995 (age 30)
- Place of birth: Mexico City, Mexico
- Height: 1.53 m (5 ft 0 in)
- Position: Winger

College career
Years	Team	Apps	(Gls)
2014–2015	Cal State Dominguez Hills Toros	33	(5)
2016–2017	Cal State Fullerton Titans	32	(1)

Senior career*
Years	Team	Apps	(Gls)
2022–2023	Tijuana	12	(0)
2024–2026	Puebla	21	(2)
- * Club domestic league appearances and goals as of 2 February 2026 ‡ National team caps and goals as of 12 March 2022

Johana Esperanza Rosas Aguirre (born 15 November 1995) is a Mexican professional footballer who plays as a Winger.

== Club career ==
In 2022, she started her career in Tijuana. Since 2024, she is part of Puebla.
