= Claudia Cid =

Mexican footballer (born 1997)

Personal information
- Full name: Claudia Fernanda Cid Macías
- Date of birth: 26 November 1997 (age 28)
- Place of birth: Puebla City, Puebla, Mexico
- Height: 1.68 m (5 ft 6 in)
- Position: Centre-back

Team information
- Current team: KFF Vllaznia
- Number: 29

Senior career*
Years	Team	Apps	(Gls)
2018–2019	BUAP	32	(3)
2019	América	2	(0)
2020–2021	León	29	(7)
2021–2023	Cruz Azul	51	(6)
2023–2024	Querétaro	8	(1)
2024–2025	Tijuana	4	(1)
2025–	KFF Vllaznia	0	(0)
- * Club domestic league appearances and goals as of 4 June 2023 ‡ National team caps and goals as of 12 March 2022

Claudia Fernanda Cid Macías (born 26 November 1997) is a Mexican professional footballer who plays as a Centre-back for Liga MX Femenil side Tijuana.

== Career ==
In 2018, she started her career in BUAP, one year later the team folded and she got signed by América. In 2020, she was transferred to León. In 2021, she signed with Cruz Azul. Since 2024, she is part of Tijuana.
