= Jorge Isaác Gómez =

Mexican football manager

Jorge Gómez
Personal information
- Full name: Jorge Isaác Gómez González
- Date of birth: 2 May 1981 (age 45)
- Place of birth: Guadalajara, Jalisco, Mexico
- Height: 1.71 m (5 ft 7 in)

Managerial career
- Years: Team
- 2007–2013: Atlas Reserves and Academy
- 2013–2014: Cachorros UdeG (Fitness coach)
- 2015–2016: Mexico U-17 (women) (Assistant)
- 2017–2018: Mexico U-20 (women) (Assistant)
- 2018: Zacatepec (Assistant)
- 2018–2019: Puebla Reserves and Academy
- 2019–2021: Puebla (women)
- 2022: Necaxa Reserves and Academy
- 2023: Necaxa (women)

Jorge Isaác Gómez González (born 2 May 1981) is a Mexican manager who was the manager for Necaxa (women) since 2023.

== Coaching career ==
In 2007, Gómez starting his career in the Atlas Reserves and Academy as a fitness coach. In 2013, he joined the Cachorros UdeG. From 2015 to 2016, Gómez was part of the technical staff of Mexico U-17 (women) and from 2017 to 2018 he was promoted to the technical staff of Mexico U-20 (women). In 2018, he joined the technical staff of Zacatepec. In 2019, Gómez was named the coach for Puebla (women). In 2023, Gómez was appointed as manager of Necaxa (women) in the Liga MX Femenil.
