= Karyme Martínez =

Mexican footballer (born 2000)

Personal information
- Full name: Karyme Alejandra Martínez Díaz
- Date of birth: 16 September 2000 (age 26)
- Place of birth: Torreón, Coahuila, Mexico
- Height: 1.62 m (5 ft 4 in)
- Position: Centre-back

Team information
- Current team: Puebla
- Number: 5

Senior career*
Years	Team	Apps	(Gls)
2018–2022	Santos Laguna	68	(0)
2026–	Puebla	5	(0)
- * Club domestic league appearances and goals as of 4 June 2023

Karyme Alejandra Martínez Díaz (born 16 September 2000) is a Mexican professional footballer who plays as a centre-back for Liga MX Femenil side Puebla.

== Club career ==
In 2018, she started her career in Santos Laguna. In 2026, she signed with Puebla.
