= Fabiola Vargas =

Mexican footballer and manager (born 1975)

Personal information
- Full name: Fabiola Arizbeth Vargas Curiel
- Date of birth: 23 March 1975 (age 51)
- Place of birth: Cuauhtémoc, Mexico City, Mexico
- Height: 1.68 m (5 ft 6 in)

Team information
- Current team: Mexico U17 (women) (assistant)

International career
Years	Team	Apps	(Gls)
1994–2001	Mexico		

Managerial career
- 2017–2018: Tijuana (women) (assistant)
- 2018–2021: Necaxa (women)
- 2021–2022: Tijuana (women)
- 2022–2023: Atlas (women)
- 2024–: Mexico U17 (women) (assistant)

Fabiola Arizbeth Vargas Curiel (born 23 March 1975) is a Mexican football manager and former player. During her career as player she represented Mexico from 1994 to 2001.

== Playing career ==
=== Early career ===
Fabiola Vargas was born in Mexico City on 23 March 1975, she lived her early years in the Tepito neighborhood but later moved to Coacalco in the State of Mexico, where she started playing basketball and football. When she was 17 she decided to dedicate full time to football.

She started playing in local leagues where she was discovered by scouts of the Mexican Football Federation who invited her to join to the Mexico women's national football team.

=== Club career ===
In 1997, she moved to Canadá to play with the semi-professional team Omega Soccer.

Vargas retired in 2001.

=== International career ===
Vargas represented Mexico from 1994 to 2001. During this time she participated in the 1994 and 1998 CONCACAF Women's Championship and in the 2000 CONCACAF Women's Gold Cup.

== Managerial career ==
Vargas went on to prepare as coach in the National School for Football Coaches in Guadalajara. After graduating in 2003, she coached and worked as an assistant in several amateur and semi-professional teams from Guadalajara, including Gansos de Etzatlán and the football team of the Universidad de Guadalajara.

In 2017, Vargas was invited by Andrea Rodebaugh to work as an assistant manager at Tijuana's female section of the newly created Liga MX Femenil.

On 5 July 2018, Vargas was announced as Necaxa's new manager.

== Managerial statistics ==
As of 24 August 2020

Managerial record by team and tenure
Team	From	To	Record								Ref
Team	From	To	G	W	D	L	GF	GA	GD	Win %	Ref
Necaxa (women)	5 July 2018	2021	61	5	14	42	30	120	−90	8.20	
