= Alberto Arellano =

Mexican football manager

Personal information
- Full name: Alberto Arellano de la Mora
- Date of birth: 2 February 1967 (age 59)
- Place of birth: Mexico City, Mexico
- Height: 1.80 m (5 ft 11 in)
- Position: Defender

Senior career*
Years	Team	Apps	(Gls)
- Cruz Azul Hidalgo

Managerial career
- 2013–2018: Querétaro Reserves and Academy
- 2018–2019: Querétaro (women)
- 2019–2020: Celaya (assistant)
- 2020–2021: Querétaro (assistant)
- 2022: UAT (assistant)
- 2023–2024: Querétaro (women)
- * Club domestic league appearances and goals

Alberto Arellano de la Mora (born 2 February 1967) is a former professional Mexican footballer and manager who last played for Cruz Azul Hidalgo and currently manages Querétaro (women) since 2023.

== Club career ==
Arellano played in Cruz Azul Hidalgo and was coached by Enrique Meza and Héctor Pulido.

== Coaching career ==
In 2013, Arellano joined the Querétaro Reserves and Academy. In 2018, Arellano was named the coach for Querétaro (women) in the Liga MX Femenil. From 2019 to 2022 he was part of the technical staff of Celaya, Querétaro and UAT, being a frequent collaborator of Héctor Altamirano. In 2023, Arellano was appointed for the second time as manager of Querétaro (women).
