= Ivonne Gutiérrez =

Mexican footballer (born 2002)

Personal information
- Full name: Ivonne Gutiérrez Cortes
- Date of birth: 14 December 2002 (age 23)
- Place of birth: Acapulco, Guerrero, Mexico
- Height: 1.60 m (5 ft 3 in)
- Position: Defender

Team information
- Current team: Cruz Azul
- Number: 23

Senior career*
Years	Team	Apps	(Gls)
2018	Toluca	9	(0)
2022–	Cruz Azul	79	(2)

International career^{‡}
2025–	Mexico	3	(0)
- * Club domestic league appearances and goals as of 1 February 2026 ‡ National team caps and goals as of 15 February 2026

Ivonne Gutiérrez Cortes (born 14 December 2002) is a Mexican professional footballer who plays as a defender for Liga Femenil side Cruz Azul and the Mexico women's national football team.

== Career ==
In 2018, she started her career in Toluca. In 2022, she signed with Cruz Azul.

== International career ==
In 2025, Gutiérrez received her first call up with Mexico to replace Greta Espinoza (injury) for a friendly match against Colombia She made her debut with Mexico on 23 October 2025, in a friendly against New Zealand.
