= Karen Itzayana Gómez =

Mexican footballer (born 2001)

Personal information
- Full name: Karen Itzayana Gómez Torres
- Date of birth: 1 August 2001 (age 25)
- Place of birth: La Paz, State of Mexico, Mexico
- Height: 1.69 m (5 ft 7 in)
- Position: Centre-back

Senior career*
Years	Team	Apps	(Gls)
2017–2022	Pachuca	73	(5)
2022–2025	León	26	(1)
2024–2025	→ Santos Laguna (loan)	15	(0)

International career^{‡}
2017–2018	Mexico U17		
- * Club domestic league appearances and goals as of 11 March 2021 ‡ National team caps and goals as of 23 February 2021

Karen Itzayana Gómez Torres (born 1 August 2001) is a Mexican footballer who plays as a Centre-back for Liga MX Femenil club Santos Laguna.

== Club career ==
In 2017, she started her career in Pachuca. In 2022, she was transferred to León. In 2024, she joined to Santos Laguna.

== International career ==
Gómez was member of the squad that played the Mexico women's national under-17 football team at the 2018 FIFA U-17 Women's World Cup.
