= Laura Herrera (footballer) =

Mexican football player (born 2003)

Personal information
- Full name: Laura Herrera Alonso
- Date of birth: June 27, 2003 (age 23)
- Place of birth: Mexico City, Mexico
- Height: 1.55 m (5 ft 1 in)
- Position: Attacking midfielder

Team information
- Current team: Puebla
- Number: 10

Senior career*
Years	Team	Apps	(Gls)
2019–2025	UNAM	137	(14)
2026	León	0	(0)
2026–	Puebla	0	(0)
- * Club domestic league appearances and goals as of 19 February 2026

Laura Herrera Alonso (born June 27, 2003) is a Mexican footballer who plays for Club León in Liga MX Femenil.

== Club career ==
In 2019, Herrera signed with Pumas. She made her Liga MX Femenil debut in August 2019.

In February 2022, she tore a cruciate ligament in her left knee.
