= Deborah Romero =

Mexican footballer (born 1997)

Personal information
- Full name: Deborah Estefanía Romero Estrada
- Date of birth: 10 January 1997 (age 29)
- Place of birth: Cuernavaca, Morelos, Mexico
- Height: 1.64 m (5 ft 4 1/2 in)
- Position: Defender

Senior career*
Years	Team	Apps	(Gls)
2017–2018	Toluca	15	(1)
2020	América	0	(0)
- * Club domestic league appearances and goals as of 26 December 2017

Deborah Estefanía Romero Estrada (born 10 January 1997) is a former Mexican football defender who last played for Club America of the Liga MX Femenil.

== See also ==
- List of people from Morelos
