= Sanjuana Muñóz =

Mexican footballer (born 1998)

Sanjuana Muñoz
Personal information
- Full name: Sanjuana De Jesús Muñoz Murillo
- Date of birth: 16 April 1998 (age 28)
- Place of birth: León, Guanajuato, Mexico
- Height: 1.70 m (5 ft 7 in)
- Position: Forward

Team information
- Current team: Atlas
- Number: 11

Senior career*
Years	Team	Apps	(Gls)
2017–2021	León	101	(20)
2019	→ Pachuca (loan)	15	(6)
2021–2022	Tijuana	33	(7)
2022–2023	Toluca	28	(0)
2023–2024	Tijuana	26	(7)
2024–2025	León	24	(1)
2025–	Atlas	23	(3)
- * Club domestic league appearances and goals as of 6 February 2026 ‡ National team caps and goals as of 12 March 2022

Sanjuana De Jesús Muñoz Murillo (born 16 April 1998) is a Mexican professional footballer who plays as a Forward for Liga MX Femenil side Atlas.

== Career ==
In 2017, she started her career in León. In 2019, she was loaned to Pachuca. In 2021, she was transferred to Tijuana. In 2022, she joined to Toluca and the next season she returned to Tijuana.
