= Mariel Román =

Mexican footballer (born 2002)

Personal information
- Full name: Mariel Román Pacheco
- Date of birth: 17 November 2002 (age 23)
- Place of birth: Iguala, Guerrero, Mexico
- Height: 1.59 m (5 ft 3 in)
- Position: Forward

Team information
- Current team: León
- Number: 26

Senior career*
Years	Team	Apps	(Gls)
2018–2026	Toluca	191	(73)

International career
2019–2020	Mexico U20		
- * Club domestic league appearances and goals as of 31 January 2026

Mariel Román Pacheco (born 17 November 2002) is a Mexican professional football midfielder who plays for León of the Liga MX Femenil.

== Career ==
In 2018, Román started her career in Toluca and is the club's all-time top goalscorer.

== International career ==
=== Mexico U-20 women's national football team ===
On March 8, 2020, Mexico U-20 women's national football team finished as Runners-up at the 2020 CONCACAF Women's U-20 Championship.

== Honours ==
Mexico U-20

- CONCACAF Women's U-20 Championship: Runners-up: 2020
