= Viridiana Salazar =

Mexican footballer (born 1998)

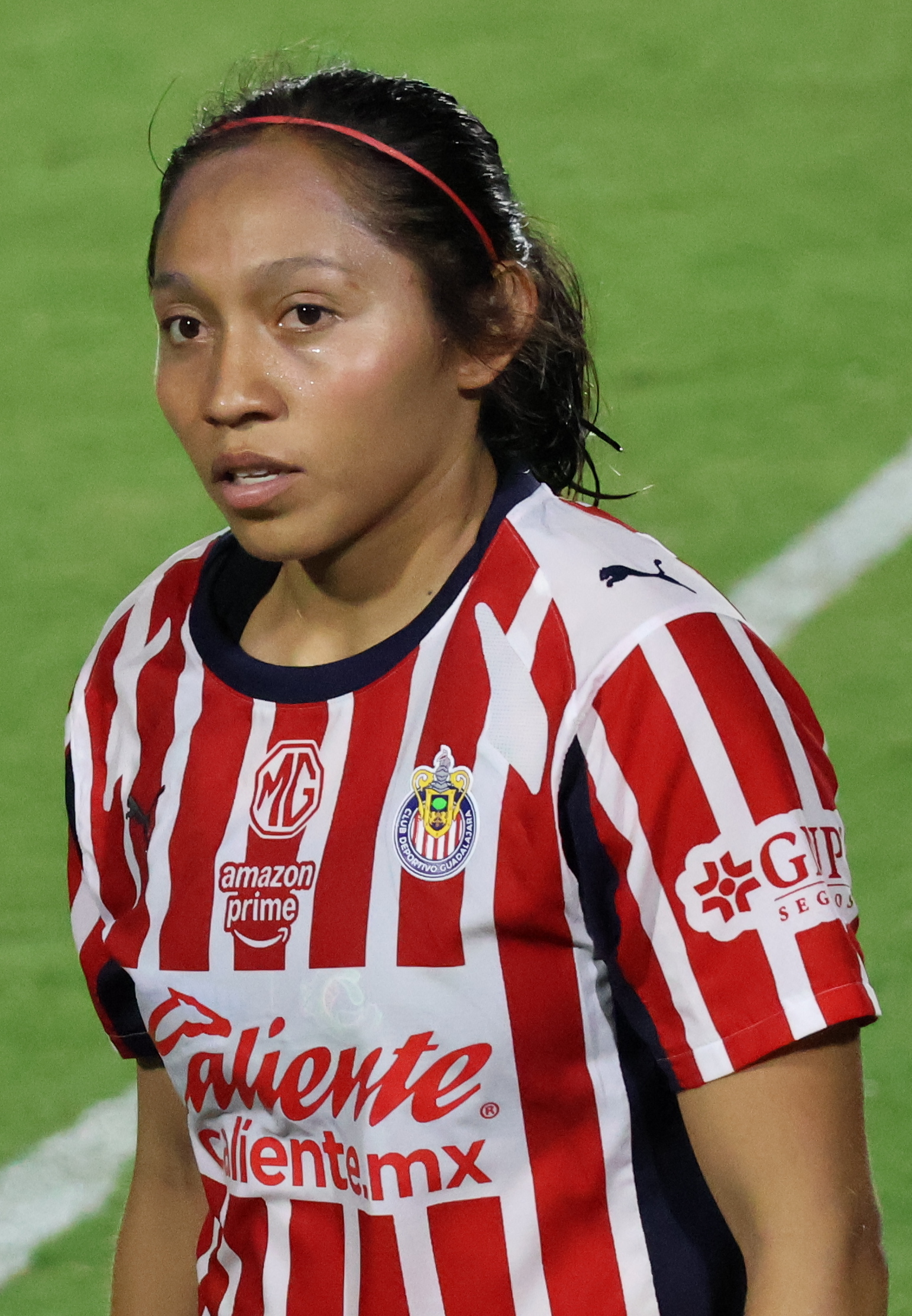
- Salazar with Guadalajara in 2025

Personal information
- Full name: Esbeydi Viridiana Salazar Suaste
- Date of birth: 2 January 1998 (age 28)
- Place of birth: Othón P. Blanco, Quintana Roo, Mexico
- Height: 1.59 m (5 ft 2 1/2 in)
- Position: Forward

Team information
- Current team: Guadalajara
- Number: 30

Senior career*
Years	Team	Apps	(Gls)
2017–2023	Pachuca	134	(70)
2024–	Guadalajara	66	(11)

International career^{‡}
2020–	Mexico	3	(0)
- * Club domestic league appearances and goals as of 31 January 2026 ‡ National team caps and goals as of 5 March 2020

Esbeydi Viridiana Salazar Suaste (born 2 January 1998) is a Mexican professional footballer who plays as a forward for Liga MX Femenil club Guadalajara and the Mexico national team.
