= Ana Paola López =

Mexican footballer (born 1994)

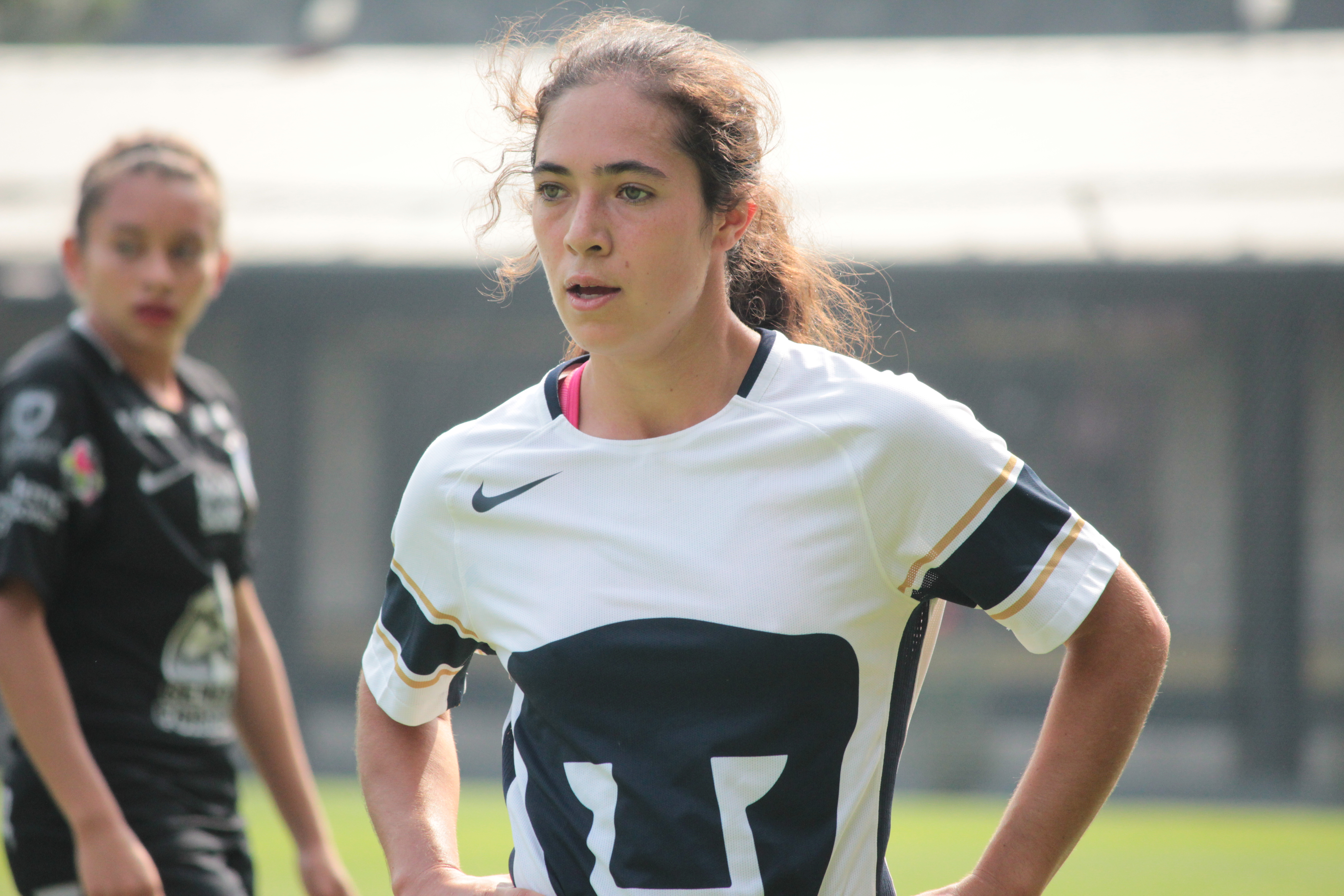
- López in 2017 playing for UNAM

Personal information
- Full name: Ana Paola López Yrigoyen
- Date of birth: February 9, 1994 (age 32)
- Place of birth: Puebla City, Puebla, Mexico
- Height: 1.64 m (5 ft 4 1/2 in)
- Position: Winger

College career
Years	Team	Apps	(Gls)
2012	South Florida Bulls	14	(2)

Senior career*
Years	Team	Apps	(Gls)
2017–2018	UNAM	34	(9)
2019–2021	Pachuca	80	(16)
2022	Cruz Azul	8	(0)

International career^{‡}
2019	Mexico	1	(0)
- * Club domestic league appearances and goals as of 14:32, 4 January 2020 (UTC) ‡ National team caps and goals as of 14:32, 4 January 2020 (UTC)

Ana Paola López Yrigoyen (born 9 February 1994) is a former Mexican professional football forward who last played for Cruz Azul (women) of the Liga MX Femenil.

== LigaMX Femenil ==
She made her debut in the Mexican Women's League Cup, Liga Mx Femenil, in the Copa LIGA MX Femenil 2017 with Club Universidad Naciona, scoring one goal that tournament. She then continued to play the first three seasons of the LigaMX with the same club, totaling nine goals for the club. For Clausura 2019 she transferred to Club Pachuca Femenil , where she scored six goals in her first tournament. She then went to score four goals in Apertura 2019 and four more on Clausura 2020. She stays with Pachuca three more tournaments before signing with Cruz Azul for her last tournament before retiring after Clausura 2022.

== International career ==
López was part of the Mexico women's national under-17 team who competed at the 2010 FIFA U-17 Women's World Cup in Trinidad and Tobago.

She was called into a training camp with the senior Mexico women's national football team in December 2019.

== Personal life ==
López briefly attended the University of South Florida, before returning to Mexico to study political science at Instituto Tecnológico Autónomo de México.
