= Lobos BUAP (women) =

Lobos BUAP Femenil
- Full name: Lobos BUAP Femenil
- Nickname: Las Lobas (The She-Wolves)
- Founded: 2018; 8 years ago
- Dissolved: 11 June 2019; 7 years ago
- Ground: Estadio Universitario BUAP; Puebla, Puebla
- Capacity: 19,283
Home colours	Away colours

Lobos BUAP Femenil was a Mexican women's football club based in the city of Puebla, Puebla. The club was the women's section of Lobos BUAP between 2018 and 2019. The team played in the Liga MX Femenil, the top-flight of women's football in Mexico.

The team was founded for the 2018–19 season of the Liga MX Femenil. Being one of the two clubs, with Puebla, that did not field a women's team for the inaugural season of the league.

== Players ==
=== Current squad ===
As of 20 January 2019

== Management team ==
Position	Staff
Head coach	José Julio Cevada Hernández
Assistant coach	Oscar Rodrigo Acosta Gómez
Fitness coach	Ricardo Moreno
Therapist	Vacant
