= Eva Espejo =

Mexican football manager (born 1986)

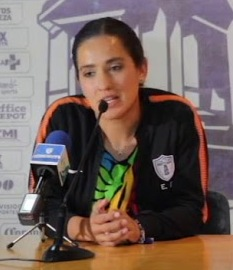
- Espejo in 2018

Personal information
- Full name: Eva Mariana Espejo Pinzón
- Date of birth: 6 January 1986 (age 40)
- Place of birth: Cuauhtémoc, Mexico City, Mexico
- Height: 1.65 m (5 ft 5 in)

Team information
- Current team: Ecuador (women) (Manager)

Managerial career
- Years: Team
- 2017–2020: Pachuca
- 2021–2023: Monterrey
- 2026–: Ecuador (women)

Eva Mariana Espejo Pinzón (born 6 January 1986) is a Mexican professional football manager who is the current manager of the Ecuador women's national football team.

== Managerial career ==
=== Pachuca Femenil ===
==== 2017 ====
In April 2017, Espejo was appointed as the first ever manager of Club Pachuca Femenil. Her first match as the club's new manager took place on 3 May 2017, when Pachuca beat Chivas de Guadalajara 6–1 in the 2017 Copa MX Femenil. Espejo's team then defeated Morelia and Toluca respectively to advance to the final where they became the first ever Cup Champions after defeating Club Tijuana 9–1.

On 28 July 2017, Espejo and her team inaugurated the Liga MX Femenil defeating Club Universidad Nacional 3–0 in the first ever women's league match, which took place in the Hidalgo Stadium.

On 19 August, they defeated Cruz Azul 1–9 in the Estadio Azul, creating a new biggest-away-win record in the League.

On 6 November, Pachuca defeated Tigres UANL 4–0 in the first leg of the semi-final. Five days later, Pachuca lost the second leg 3–0 that ended with a 4–3 aggregate score that would let Espejo advance to the first-ever League final. On 20 November, Pachuca hosted the first leg of the final against Chivas de Guadalajara which ended with a favorable score of 2–0 and on 24 November Pachuca lost the second leg 3–0 which ended in a 3–2 ending with Pachuca's hope to become the first ever league champions.

On 22 November, Espejo was nominated for the 2017 Women's Football Coach of the Year award by CONCACAF. On 19 December, she was named the best coach of the year.

==== 2020 ====
On 10 February 2020, Espejo reached 100 matches as head coach of Pachuca.

== Managerial statistics ==
As of 10 December 2020

Managerial record by team and tenure
Team	From	To	Record							
Team	From	To	G	W	D	L	GF	GA	GD	Win %
Pachuca	25 January 2017	10 December 2020	126	76	18	32	270	145	+125	60.32
Career totals			126	76	18	32	270	145	+125	60.32

== Honours ==
=== Manager ===
Pachuca Femenil

- Copa MX Femenil: 2017

Monterrey Femenil

- Liga MX Femenil: Apertura 2021

Individual

- CONCACAF Coach of the Year: 2017
