= Club Puebla (women) =

Mexican professional football club

Puebla Femenil
- Full name: Club Puebla Femenil
- Nicknames: Las Camoteras (The Sweet Potatoers); La Franja (The Strip Band)
- Founded: 2018; 8 years ago
- Ground: Estadio Cuauhtémoc; Puebla, Puebla
- Capacity: 51,726
- Owner: Operadora de Escenarios Deportivos S.A. de C.V.
- Chairman: Manuel Jiménez García
- Manager: José Carlos Durón
- League: Liga Femenil
- Clausura 2026: Regular phase: 15th Final phase: Did not qualify
Home colours	Away colours

Club Puebla Femenil is a Mexican professional women's football club based in the city of Puebla, Puebla. The club has been the women’s section of Puebla since 2018. The team plays in the Liga Femenil, the top-flight of women's football in Mexico.

The team was founded for the 2018–19 season of the Liga MX Femenil. Being one of the two clubs, with Lobos BUAP, that did not field a women's team for the inaugural season of the league.

== Personnel ==
=== Club administration ===
Position	Staff
Chairman	(Mexico) Manuel Jiménez García
Sporting director	(Mexico) Brenda Viramontes

=== Coaching staff ===
Position	Staff
Manager	(Mexico) José Carlos Durón
Assistant manager	(Mexico) Julio Servín
Fitness coach	(Mexico) Josué Garzón
Team doctor	(Mexico) Denisse Aguilar
Team doctor assistant	(Mexico) Joaquín Camarena

== Players ==
=== Current squad ===
As of 31 July 2026

Note: Flags indicate national team as defined under FIFA eligibility rules; some limited exceptions apply. Players may hold more than one non-FIFA nationality.

No.	Pos.	Nation	Player
1	GK	ARG	Renata Masciarelli
2	DF	VEN	María Peraza
3	DF	MEX	Lia Martínez (on loan from Cruz Azul)
4	DF	USA	Yulexi Diaz
5	DF	MEX	Karyme Martínez
6	MF	SLV	Abigail Martínez
7	MF	CAN	Adaira Nakano
8	DF	MEX	Alika Sánchez
9	DF	USA	Kendyl Terrell
10	MF	MEX	Laura Herrera
11	MF	USA	Zara Dominguez

No.	Pos.	Nation	Player
13	MF	MEX	Hanna Osorio (on loan from Cruz Azul)
14	MF	USA	Abigail López
16	DF	MEX	Dulce Martínez
17	DF	MEX	Yanín Madrid
19	GK	MEX	Paola Pérez
20	MF	MEX	Diana Salmorán (on loan from Cruz Azul)
22	MF	USA	Brina Micheels
23	FW	UGA	Juliet Nalukenge
24	MF	MEX	Natalia Collado
25	FW	MEX	Paulina Suárez
27	MF	MEX	Vania Morón
