= C.D. Veracruz (women) =

Mexican football club

Veracruz Femenil
- Full name: Club Tiburones Femenil
- Nickname: Las Tiburonas Rojas (The Red Sharks)
- Founded: 2016; 10 years ago
- Dissolved: 5 December 2019; 6 years ago
- Ground: Estadio Luis "Pirata" Fuente; Veracruz, Veracruz
- Capacity: 28,703
- League: Liga MX Femenil
Home colours	Away colours	Third colours

Club Tiburones Femenil was a Mexican women's football club based in the city of Veracruz, Veracruz. The club was the women's section of Tiburones Rojos de Veracruz between 2017 and 2019. The team played in the Liga MX Femenil which started in July 2017.
