= Club Necaxa (women) =

Mexican football club

Necaxa Femenil
- Full name: Impulsora del Deportivo Necaxa S.A. de C.V. Femenil
- Nickname: Las Centellas
- Founded: 5 December 2016; 9 years ago
- Ground: Estadio Victoria; Aguascalientes, Aguascalientes
- Capacity: 23,000
- Owner(s): NX Football USA LLC (50%); Inmosan (50%)
- Chairman: Ernesto Tinajero Flores
- Manager: Vacant
- League: Liga Femenil
- Clausura 2026: Regular phase: 18th Final phase: Did not qualify
Home colours	Away colours

Club Necaxa Femenil is a Mexican women's football club based in the city of Aguascalientes, Aguascalientes. The club has been the women's section of Necaxa since 2017. The team currently plays in the Liga Femenil which was founded on September 2017.

== Personnel ==
=== Management ===
Position	Staff
Chairman	(Mexico) Ernesto Tinajero Flores
Sporting Director	(Mexico) Braulio Torres

Source: Liga MX

=== Coaching staff ===
Position	Staff
Manager	Vacant
Assistant manager	(Mexico) Hugo López
Fitness coach	(Mexico) Salvador Ortíz
Team doctor	(Mexico) Mirna Huizar
Team doctor assistant	(Mexico) Andrea López

== Players ==
=== Current squad ===
As of 31 July 2026

Note: Flags indicate national team as defined under FIFA eligibility rules; some limited exceptions apply. Players may hold more than one non-FIFA nationality.

No.	Pos.	Nation	Player
1	GK	MEX	Adriana Meza
2	DF	MEX	Alexa Gutiérrez
3	DF	GUA	Briana Johnson
4	MF	USA	Meghan Cavanaugh
5	DF	MEX	Lourdes de León
7	MF	GUA	Acacia Edwards
8	MF	MEX	Mariana de la Torre
9	FW	DOM	Winibian Peralta
10	MF	VEN	Ana Paula Fraiz
12	MF	USA	Alejandra Melendez
13	MF	USA	Jada Barnett
14	FW	USA	Trinidad Quiroz

No.	Pos.	Nation	Player
15	DF	MEX	Fátima Bracamonte
16	MF	MEX	Julieta Pérez
18	DF	MEX	Zayra Cervantes
19	MF	MEX	Keirah Hope
21	FW	MEX	Ariana Navarro
22	MF	ARM	Ani Jensen
23	DF	MEX	Avril Navarro
24	DF	MEX	Laisha Ávalos
27	FW	PER	Sashenka Porras
31	GK	MEX	Daniela Sánchez
33	DF	MEX	Samantha Plascencia
