= 2026–27 Liga Femenil season =

Mexican women's football league season

Liga Femenil
- Season: 2026–27
- Matches: 117
- Goals: 422 (3.61 per match)
- Top goalscorer: Apertura: Geyse (21 goals)
- Biggest home win: Apertura: América 10–0 Cruz Azul (8 August 2026); Monterrey 10–0 Necaxa (18 September 2026)
- Biggest away win: Apertura: Necaxa 0–7 América (23 August 2026)
- Highest scoring: Apertura: América 10–0 Cruz Azul (8 August 2026)
- Longest winning run: Apertura: 7 matches América
- Longest unbeaten run: Apertura: 9 matches América
- Longest winless run: Apertura: 13 matches Necaxa
- Longest losing run: Apertura: 13 matches Necaxa
- Highest attendance: Apertura: 20,295; América vs. Tigres UANL (13 September 2026)
- Lowest attendance: Apertura: 50; Atlante vs. Necaxa (3 August 2026)
- Total attendance: Apertura: 275,004
- Average attendance: Apertura: 2,500
- Stats are from the regular phase only. Source: Liga MX Femenil

The 2026–27 Liga Femenil season is the tenth season of the premier women's football league in Mexico. The season began on 31 July 2026 and will finish in May 2027.

This season is the first after the reform and rebranding of the competition, which from this edition onwards is named "Liga Femenil" as part of the league objective of separating itself from Liga MX. A new competition format different from the format used in Liga MX was also announced. This format, which reduced the number of games played during the regular phase of each tournament by three, is expected to assist clubs in reducing operating costs, but also to help reduced player injuries, and allow teams to have a better weekly preparation.

== Stadiums and locations ==
| América | Atlante | Atlas | Atlético San Luis | Cruz Azul |
|---|---|---|---|---|
| Estadio Azteca | CAR Atlante – field 1 | Estadio Jalisco | Estadio Libertad Financiera | Estadio Centenario |
| Capacity: 87,523 | Capacity: TBA | Capacity: 55,110 | Capacity: 25,111 | Capacity: 9,670 |
| Guadalajara | Juárez | León | Monterrey | Necaxa |
| Estadio Akron | Estadio Olímpico Benito Juárez | Estadio León | Estadio BBVA | Estadio Victoria |
| Capacity: 46,232 | Capacity: 19,703 | Capacity: 31,297 | Capacity: 51,348 | Capacity: 23,851 |
| Pachuca | Puebla | Querétaro | Santos Laguna | Tijuana |
| Estadio Hidalgo | Estadio Cuauhtémoc | Estadio Corregidora | Estadio Corona | Estadio Caliente |
| Capacity: 27,512 | Capacity: 51,726 | Capacity: 33,162 | Capacity: 29,237 | Capacity: 27,333 |
| Toluca | UANL | UNAM | | |
| Estadio Nemesio Díez | Estadio Universitario | Estadio Olímpico Universitario | | |
| Capacity: 31,000 | Capacity: 41,886 | Capacity: 48,297 | | |

== Alternate venues ==
- América – Mini Estadio El Nido (Capacity: 3,000)
- Atlas – CECAF (Capacity: 1,000)
- Cruz Azul – Instalaciones La Noria (Capacity: 2,000)
- Guadalajara – Verde Valle (Capacity: 800)
- Guadalajara – Estadio Jalisco (Capacity: 55,110)
- León – La Esmeralda Cancha Sintética (Capacity: 1,000)
- Monterrey – El Barrial (Capacity: 570)
- Necaxa – Instalaciones Club Necaxa (Capacity: 1,000)
- Puebla - Club Alpha 3 (Capacity: 500)
- Querétaro - Estadio Olímpico Alameda (Capacity: 4,600)
- Toluca – Instalaciones Metepec (Capacity: 1,000)
- UANL – Instalaciones Zuazua (Capacity: 800)
- UNAM – La Cantera (Capacity: 2,000)
Location of the 2026–27 Liga MX Femenil teams
Location of the 2026–27 Liga MX Femenil teams in Greater Mexico City

== Personnel and kits ==
| Team | Chairman | Head coach | Kit manufacturer | Shirt sponsor(s) |
|---|---|---|---|---|
| América | Santiago Baños | (Spain) Ángel Villacampa | Adidas | Caliente |
| Atlante | Emilio Escalante | (Mexico) Ileana Dávila | Charly | Caliente |
| Atlas | Gerardo Casanova | (Mexico) Juan Pablo Alfaro | Charly | Caliente |
| Atlético San Luis | Jacobo Payán Espinosa | (Mexico) Ignacio Quintana | Charly | Canel's |
| Cruz Azul | Víctor Velázquez | (Mexico) Joaquín Moreno (interim) | Pirma | Cemento Cruz Azul |
| Guadalajara | Amaury Vergara | (Spain) Antonio Contreras | Puma | Sello Rojo |
| Juárez | Andrés Fassi | (Spain) Óscar Fernández | Joma | |
| León | Jesús Martínez Murguia | (Mexico) Alejandro Corona | Charly | Cementos Fortaleza, Telcel |
| Monterrey | Dennis te Kloese | (France) Amandine Miquel | Puma | BBVA, Kotex, Tim Hortons |
| Necaxa | Ernesto Tinajero Flores | (Mexico) Hugo Sánchez | Pirma | Rolcar, Playdoit, JR Romo |
| Pachuca | Armando Martínez Patiño | (Spain) Montse Tomé | Skechers | Cementos Fortaleza, Saba, JAC Motors, Telcel |
| Puebla | Manuel Jiménez García | (Mexico) José Carlos Durón | Pirma | Banco Azteca |
| Pumas UNAM | Luis Raúl González | (Mexico) Roberto Medina | Nike | DHL Express, Mifel |
| Querétaro | Marc Spiegel | (Italy) Pamela Conti | Skechers | |
| Santos Laguna | Aleco Irarragorri Kalb | (Mexico) Jhonathan Lazcano | Charly | Peñoles, Soriana |
| Tigres UANL | Carlos Emilio González | (Spain) Pedro Martínez Losa | Adidas | Cemex |
| Tijuana | Jorge Hank Inzunsa | (Mexico) Fernando Samayoa | Reebok | Caliente |
| Toluca | Francisco Suinaga Conde | (Mexico) Édgar Dueñas | New Balance | Arabela |

=== Managerial/coaching changes ===
| Club | Outgoing manager/coach | Manner of departure | Date of vacancy | Replaced by | Date of appointment | Position in table | Ref. |
Pre-Apertura changes
| Atlante | New team | | | (Mexico) Nicolás Morales | 19 June 2026 | Pre–season | |
| Querétaro | (Mexico) Édgar Mejía | Mutual agreement | 4 May 2026 | (Italy) Pamela Conti | 2 June 2026 | Pre–season | |
| Toluca | (France) Patrice Lair | Sacked | 12 May 2026 | (Spain) Alberto Toril | 10 June 2026 | Pre–season | |
| Necaxa | (Mexico) Christian Astorga | End of contract | 15 May 2026 | (Mexico) Hugo Sánchez | 26 May 2026 | Pre–season | |
| Puebla | (Mexico) Carlos Adrián Morales | Named as Puebla U–21 coach | 25 May 2026 | (Mexico) José Carlos Durón | 9 June 2026 | Pre–season | |
Apertura changes
| Cruz Azul | (Mexico) Israel del Real | Sacked | 11 August 2026 | (Mexico) Lupita Worbis (interim) | 11 August 2026 | 12th | |
| Cruz Azul | (Mexico) Lupita Worbis (interim) | End of tenure as caretaker | 23 August 2026 | (Mexico) Raúl Gutiérrez | 23 August 2026 | 9th | |
| Atlante | (Mexico) Nicolás Morales | Sacked | 22 September 2026 | (Mexico) Ileana Dávila | 23 September 2026 | 14th | |
| Pachuca | (Mexico) Oscar Fernando Torres | Sacked | 22 September 2026 | (Spain) Montse Tomé | 24 September 2026 | 13th | |
| Toluca | (Spain) Alberto Toril | Mutual agreement | 7 October 2026 | (Mexico) Édgar Dueñas | 10 October 2026 | 4th | |
| Cruz Azul | (Mexico) Raúl Gutiérrez | Sacked | 16 October 2026 | (Mexico) Joaquín Moreno (interim) | 17 October 2026 | 9th | |

== Format ==
- The Liga MX Femenil season is split into two championships: the Torneo Apertura 2026 (opening tournament) and the Torneo Clausura 2027 (closing tournament). Each is contested in an identical format and includes the same eighteen teams.
- Since this season, the competition format was changed once more to introduced the current format, with the league bringing back the group format previously used during the 2018–19 season, although with new additions. With this format, 18 teams are divided into two groups of nine based on each team's performance on their regular phase of previous seasons and geographic location — The groups are the same for both Apertura and Clausura tournament. Each group is further divided into three blocks (block 1, 2, and 3), with each block consisting of three teams. Each team will play a single match against each of the other eights teams in its group, and an additional six matches against teams from the opposite group for a total of 14 matches. The six inter-group matches are drawn from the three blocks of each group (two matches per block). Furthermore, the three teams from each block that did not played against a specific team from the opposite group, will play an inter-group match against that team during the Clausura tournament, with this each team in the league will face against each other at least once during the full season. With this format, the top four teams of each group qualify to the final phase.

== Torneo Apertura ==
The Torneo Apertura 2026 is the first tournament of the season. The tournament began on 31 July 2026. The defending champions are América.

Atlante joined the league as a new team, replacing Mazatlán, that sold its franchise in the league to the Mexico City team.

=== Regular phase ===
==== Group A ====
| Pos | Team | Pld | W | D | L | GF | GA | GD | Pts | Qualification or relegation |
|---|---|---|---|---|---|---|---|---|---|---|
| 1 | Monterrey | 14 | 12 | 1 | 1 | 50 | 16 | +34 | 37 | Advance to Liguilla (Note: The first 4 places in the two groups qualify for the Liguilla. The last ranked team in the relegation table can qualify for the liguilla in the Apertura tournament.) |
| 2 | Tigres UANL | 14 | 11 | 2 | 1 | 47 | 12 | +35 | 35 | Advance to Liguilla |
| 3 | Juárez | 14 | 10 | 0 | 4 | 21 | 12 | +9 | 30 | Advance to Liguilla |
| 4 | Toluca | 14 | 8 | 3 | 3 | 30 | 21 | +9 | 27 | Advance to Liguilla |
| 5 | León | 14 | 8 | 1 | 5 | 23 | 20 | +3 | 25 | |
| 6 | Santos Laguna | 14 | 7 | 1 | 6 | 21 | 25 | −4 | 22 | |
| 7 | Cruz Azul | 14 | 6 | 0 | 8 | 18 | 27 | −9 | 18 | |
| 8 | Querétaro | 14 | 2 | 1 | 11 | 12 | 32 | −20 | 7 | |
| 9 | Atlante | 14 | 2 | 1 | 11 | 6 | 26 | −20 | 7 | |

Updated to match(es) played on 6 November 2026. Source: Liga MX Femenil
Rules for classification: 1) Points; 2) Goal difference; 3) Number of goals scored; 4) Head-to-head results between tied teams; 5) Number of goals scored away; 6) Highest relegation coefficient; 7) Fair Play points

==== Group B ====
| Pos | Team | Pld | W | D | L | GF | GA | GD | Pts | Qualification or relegation |
|---|---|---|---|---|---|---|---|---|---|---|
| 1 | América | 14 | 12 | 1 | 1 | 63 | 13 | +50 | 37 | Advance to Liguilla (Note: The first 4 places in the two groups qualify for the Liguilla. The last ranked team in the relegation table can qualify for the liguilla in the Apertura tournament.) |
| 2 | Guadalajara | 14 | 10 | 0 | 4 | 33 | 16 | +17 | 30 | Advance to Liguilla |
| 3 | Pumas UNAM | 14 | 6 | 2 | 6 | 23 | 25 | −2 | 20 | Advance to Liguilla |
| 4 | Pachuca | 14 | 6 | 1 | 7 | 29 | 20 | +9 | 19 | Advance to Liguilla |
| 5 | Atlético San Luis | 14 | 6 | 1 | 7 | 25 | 28 | −3 | 19 | |
| 6 | Atlas | 14 | 4 | 5 | 5 | 14 | 28 | −14 | 17 | |
| 7 | Tijuana | 14 | 3 | 2 | 9 | 18 | 33 | −15 | 11 | |
| 8 | Puebla | 14 | 1 | 1 | 12 | 19 | 48 | −29 | 4 | |
| 9 | Necaxa | 14 | 0 | 1 | 13 | 5 | 54 | −49 | 1 | |

Updated to match(es) played on 6 November 2026. Source: Liga MX Femenil
Rules for classification: 1) Points; 2) Goal difference; 3) Number of goals scored; 4) Head-to-head results between tied teams; 5) Number of goals scored away; 6) Highest relegation coefficient; 7) Fair Play points

==== League table ====
From this edition onwards, the league table will not be used to determine the eight teams that qualify for the playoffs; however, it will be the mechanism used for seeding the teams from the semifinals onwards.

| Pos | Team | Pld | W | D | L | GF | GA | GD | Pts | Qualification or relegation |
|---|---|---|---|---|---|---|---|---|---|---|
| 1 | América | 14 | 12 | 1 | 1 | 63 | 13 | +50 | 37 | Advance to Liguilla (Note: The first 4 places in the two groups qualify for the Liguilla.) |
| 2 | Monterrey | 14 | 12 | 1 | 1 | 50 | 16 | +34 | 37 | Advance to Liguilla |
| 3 | Tigres UANL | 14 | 11 | 2 | 1 | 47 | 12 | +35 | 35 | Advance to Liguilla |
| 4 | Guadalajara | 14 | 10 | 0 | 4 | 33 | 16 | +17 | 30 | Advance to Liguilla |
| 5 | Juárez | 14 | 10 | 0 | 4 | 21 | 12 | +9 | 30 | Advance to Liguilla |
| 6 | Toluca | 14 | 8 | 3 | 3 | 30 | 21 | +9 | 27 | Advance to Liguilla |
| 7 | León | 14 | 8 | 1 | 5 | 23 | 20 | +3 | 25 | |
| 8 | Santos Laguna | 14 | 7 | 1 | 6 | 21 | 25 | −4 | 22 | |
| 9 | Pumas UNAM | 14 | 6 | 2 | 6 | 23 | 25 | −2 | 20 | Advance to Liguilla |
| 10 | Pachuca | 14 | 6 | 1 | 7 | 29 | 20 | +9 | 19 | Advance to Liguilla |
| 11 | Atlético San Luis | 14 | 6 | 1 | 7 | 25 | 29 | −4 | 19 | |
| 12 | Cruz Azul | 14 | 6 | 0 | 8 | 18 | 27 | −9 | 18 | |
| 13 | Atlas | 14 | 4 | 5 | 5 | 14 | 28 | −14 | 17 | |
| 14 | Tijuana | 14 | 3 | 2 | 9 | 18 | 33 | −15 | 11 | |
| 15 | Querétaro | 14 | 2 | 1 | 11 | 12 | 32 | −20 | 7 | |
| 16 | Atlante | 14 | 2 | 1 | 11 | 6 | 26 | −20 | 7 | |
| 17 | Puebla | 14 | 1 | 1 | 12 | 19 | 48 | −29 | 4 | |
| 18 | Necaxa | 14 | 0 | 1 | 13 | 5 | 54 | −49 | 1 | |

Updated to match(es) played on 6 November 2026. Source: Liga MX Femenil
Rules for classification: 1) Points; 2) Goal difference; 3) Number of goals scored; 4) Head-to-head results between tied teams; 5) Number of goals scored away; 6) Highest relegation coefficient; 7) Fair Play points

==== Results ====
Each team will play a single match against each of the other eights teams in its group, and an additional six matches against teams from the opposite group for a total of 14 matches. The six inter-group matches are drawn from the three blocks of each group (two matches per block).

| Home \ Away | AME | ATN | ATS | ASL | CAZ | GUA | JUA | LEO | MON | NEC | PAC | PUE | UNM | QUE | SAN | UNL | TIJ | TOL |
|---|---|---|---|---|---|---|---|---|---|---|---|---|---|---|---|---|---|---|
| América | — | 6–0 | 2–2 | — | 10–0 | — | — | — | — | — | 2–1 | 5–1 | — | — | — | 5–2 | 3–1 | — |
| Atlante | — | — | — | — | — | 0–1 | 0–1 | — | — | 1–0 | — | — | 0–0 | 2–1 | — | 0–4 | — | 1–2 |
| Atlas | — | 1–0 | — | — | — | 0–4 | — | 2–2 | — | — | 1–1 | 2–1 | — | — | — | 0–7 | 2–0 | — |
| Atlético San Luis | 0–7 | — | 6–1 | — | — | — | 1–2 | — | — | — | 2–1 | — | — | — | 2–3 | — | 2–1 | 1–4 |
| Cruz Azul | — | 3–1 | 3–1 | — | — | 0–1 | — | 1–2 | — | — | — | — | 3–2 | — | — | 0–3 | — | 1–2 |
| Guadalajara | 1–3 | — | — | 3–1 | — | — | 1–0 | — | 2–3 | 7–0 | — | — | 0–2 | 3–1 | — | — | — | — |
| Juárez | — | — | — | — | 1–0 | — | — | — | 1–2 | 1–0 | 1–0 | — | — | 2–1 | 3–2 | — | 5–1 | — |
| León | 0–5 | 2–0 | — | 1–0 | — | — | 0–2 | — | — | — | — | 5–2 | — | 0–1 | — | 1–2 | — | — |
| Monterrey | 4–3 | 3–1 | — | — | 1–0 | — | — | 2–3 | — | 10–0 | — | — | 6–0 | — | — | — | — | 5–1 |
| Necaxa | 0–7 | — | 1–1 | 0–2 | 0–2 | — | — | — | — | — | — | — | 1–2 | — | 1–3 | — | — | 0–4 |
| Pachuca | — | — | — | — | — | 3–1 | — | 0–1 | — | 5–0 | — | 4–3 | 3–1 | — | 4–1 | — | — | 1–2 |
| Puebla | — | — | — | 2–5 | — | 1–4 | 1–2 | — | 1–2 | 4–1 | — | — | — | 2–6 | — | — | 1–1 | — |
| Pumas UNAM | 1–2 | — | 1–0 | 3–1 | — | — | — | 2–5 | — | — | — | 2–0 | — | 5–0 | — | 1–3 | — | — |
| Querétaro | — | — | 0–1 | 0–1 | 0–2 | — | — | — | 0–4 | — | 0–5 | — | — | — | 1–2 | — | — | 1–1 |
| Santos Laguna | 0–3 | 1–0 | — | — | 2–0 | — | — | 1–2 | 1–4 | — | — | 1–0 | — | — | — | — | 4–2 | — |
| Tigres UANL | — | — | — | 1–1 | — | — | 1–0 | — | 2–2 | — | 2–0 | 8–0 | — | 2–0 | 3–0 | — | — | — |
| Tijuana | — | 1–0 | — | — | 1–3 | 0–2 | — | — | 1–2 | 5–1 | 3–1 | — | 1–1 | — | — | — | — | — |
| Toluca | — | — | 1–1 | — | — | 2–3 | 2–0 | 1–0 | — | — | — | — | — | — | 0–0 | 2–7 | 6–0 | — |

Updated to match(es) played on 6 November 2026. Source: Liga MX Femenil
Legend: Blue = home team win; Yellow = draw; Red = away team win.
For upcoming matches, an "a" indicates there is an article about the rivalry between the two participants.

=== Regular season statistics ===
==== Top goalscorers ====
Players sorted first by goals scored, then by last name.

| Rank | Player | Club | Goals |
|---|---|---|---|
| 1 | (Brazil) Geyse | América | 21 |
| 2 | (Venezuela) Enyerliannys Higuera | Atlético San Luis | 15 |
| 3 | (South Africa) Thembi Kgatlana | Tigres UANL | 12 |
| 4 | (Mexico) Charlyn Corral | Pachuca | 11 |
| 4 | (France) Eugénie Le Sommer | Toluca | 11 |
| 6 | (Mexico) Alicia Cervantes | Guadalajara | 10 |
| 6 | (Spain) Lucía García | Monterrey | 10 |
| 8 | (Mexico) Diana Ordóñez | Tigres UANL | 9 |
| 8 | (Portugal) Stephanie Ribeiro | Pumas UNAM | 9 |
| 10 | (Guatemala) Aisha Solórzano | Juárez | 8 |

Source:Liga MX Femenil

==== Hat-tricks ====
| Player | For | Against | Result | Date | Round | Ref |
|---|---|---|---|---|---|---|
| (Mexico) Diana Ordóñez^{4} | UANL | Puebla | 8 – 0 (H) | 1 August 2026 | 1 | |
| (Turkey) Kader Hançar | Tijuana | Necaxa | 5 – 1 (H) | 15 August 2026 | 3 | |
| (Brazil) Geyse^{4} | América | Necaxa | 7 – 0 (A) | 23 August 2026 | 4 | |
| (Colombia) Manuela Paví | Toluca | Tijuana | 6 – 0 (H) | 14 September 2026 | 7 | |
| (Mexico) Diana García | Monterrey | Necaxa | 10 – 0 (H) | 18 September 2026 | 7 | |
| (South Africa) Thembi Kgatlana | Tigres UANL | Toluca | 2 – 7 (A) | 21 September 2026 | 8 | |
| (Guatemala) Aisha Solórzano | Juárez | Tijuana | 5 – 1 (H) | 26 September 2026 | 9 | |
| (France) Eugénie Le Sommer^{4} | Toluca | Necaxa | 0 – 4 (A) | 28 September 2026 | 9 | |
| (Mexico) Stephany Mayor | Tigres UANL | Atlante | 0 – 4 (A) | 5 November 2026 | 14 | |

^{4} Player scored four goals
(H) – Home; (A) – Away

- First goal of the season:
  (Mexico) Renata Huerta for Atlas against Cruz Azul (31 July 2026)
- Last goal of the season:
  (France) Lindsey Thomas for Monterrey against Juárez (6 November 2026)

=== Discipline ===
==== Team ====
- Most yellow cards: 33
  - Querétaro
- Most red cards: 4
  - Monterrey
- Fewest yellow cards: 15
  - Monterrey
- Fewest red cards: 0
  - América
  - Atlante

Source Liga MX Femenil

=== Attendance ===
NOTE: Information on some América and Atlante matches is unavailable.

==== Per team ====
| Pos | Team | Total | High | Low | Average | Change |
|---|---|---|---|---|---|---|
| 1 | América | 53,311 | 20,295 | 15,597 | 17,770 | +362.5% |
| 2 | Guadalajara | 31,882 | 6,680 | 3,497 | 5,314 | +6.7% |
| 3 | Pumas UNAM | 27,969 | 12,850 | 2,051 | 4,662 | +75.4% |
| 4 | Monterrey | 31,954 | 6,253 | 2,839 | 4,565 | −43.1% |
| 5 | Tigres UANL | 30,853 | 13,754 | 2,279 | 4,408 | +6.8% |
| 6 | Cruz Azul | 14,386 | 4,007 | 1,136 | 2,398 | −35.1% |
| 7 | Toluca | 14,492 | 5,221 | 998 | 2,070 | −14.7% |
| 8 | Pachuca | 9,546 | 3,117 | 842 | 1,591 | −26.6% |
| 9 | León | 10,301 | 5,394 | 567 | 1,472 | +83.8% |
| 10 | Juárez | 8,437 | 3,218 | 947 | 1,406 | +0.1% |
| 11 | Tijuana | 9,231 | 2,633 | 633 | 1,319 | −26.7% |
| 12 | Atlético San Luis | 9,160 | 4,208 | 360 | 1,309 | −16.5% |
| 13 | Necaxa | 5,423 | 3,170 | 383 | 1,085 | +50.3% |
| 14 | Querétaro | 3,674 | 1,075 | 378 | 735 | +11.7% |
| 15 | Atlas | 5,094 | 2,704 | 431 | 728 | +109.8% |
| 16 | Puebla | 5,023 | 2,198 | 397 | 718 | +13.1% |
| 17 | Santos Laguna | 3,423 | 1,532 | 207 | 571 | +2.1% |
| 18 | Atlante | 374 | 120 | 50 | 94 | n/a^{1} |
| | League total | 275,004 | 20,295 | 50 | 2,500 | +9.6% |

Source: Liga MX
Notes:
Only regular season listed
1: Atlante did not play the last tournament.

Source: Liga MX Femenil

=== Liguilla ===
The the top four teams from each group play two games against each other on a home-and-away basis. The higher seeded teams play on their home field during the second leg. The winner of each match up is determined by aggregate score. In the quarterfinals and semifinals, if the two teams are tied on aggregate, the higher seeded team advances. In the final, if the two teams are tied after both legs, the match goes to a penalty shoot-out.

Quarter-finals
1B | América | 3 | 3 | 6
4A | Toluca | 0 | 0 | 0
2A | Tigres UANL | 3 | 0 | 3
3B | Pumas UNAM | 2 | 5 | 7
1A | Monterrey | 1 | 3 | 4
4B | Pachuca | 0 | 2 | 2
2B | Guadalajara (s) | 0 | 1 | 1
3A | Juárez | 0 | 1 | 1

Semi-finals
1B | América
3B | Pumas UNAM
1A | Monterrey
2B | Guadalajara

Final

==== Quarter-finals ====
The first legs were played on 10 and 11 November, and the second legs were played on 14 and 15 November 2026.

| Team 1 | Agg. | Team 2 | 1st leg | 2nd leg |
|---|---|---|---|---|
| América | 6–0 | Toluca | 3–0 | 3–0 |
| Monterrey | 4–2 | Pachuca | 1–0 | 3–2 |
| Tigres UANL | 3–7 | Pumas UNAM | 3–2 | 0–5 |
| Guadalajara (s) | 1–1 | Juárez | 0–0 | 1–1 |

11 November 2026
21:00 CST (UTC−6)

| Pachuca | 0–1 | Monterrey |
|---|---|---|
| | Report | D. García 1' |

Estadio Hidalgo, Pachuca
Referee: Figo Rodolfo López (Sinaloa)
15 November 2026
19:05 CST (UTC−6)

| Monterrey | 3–2 | Pachuca |
|---|---|---|
| Del Campo 46'; D. García 69'; Godínez 80' | Report | M. García 9'; Gomes 19' |

Estadio BBVA, Guadalupe
Referee: Cesia Deysire Campos (Coahuila)

Monterrey won 4–2 on aggregate.

11 November 2026
19:00 CST (UTC−6)

| América | 3–0 | Toluca |
|---|---|---|
| Ramírez 6' (own); Jana Gutiérrez 48'; Guerrero 58' (pen.) | Report |

Estadio Azteca, Mexico City (Note: The order of the matches has been reversed because Estadio Azteca will be in use for an NFL game on the weekend when América was scheduled to host, as they were the higher-seeded team.)
Referee: Ximena Márquez Ruíz (Mexico City)
15 November 2026
21:10 CST (UTC−6)

| Toluca | 0–3 | América |
|---|---|---|
| | Report | Geyse 8'; Camberos 41'; Priscila 80' |

Estadio Nemesio Diez, Toluca
Referee: Diana Velázquez Lomelí (Aguascalientes)

América won 6–0 on aggregate.

10 November 2026
19:00 CST (UTC−6)

| Pumas UNAM | 2–3 | Tigres UANL |
|---|---|---|
| Ribeiro 14', 45+7' (pen.) | Report | Reyes 6', 33'; Ordóñez 60' |

Estadio Olímpico Universitario, Mexico City
Referee: Montserrat Pérez Comellas (Puebla)
14 November 2026
17:00 CST (UTC−6)

| Tigres UANL | 0–5 | Pumas UNAM |
|---|---|---|
| | Report | Ribeiro 25', 66'; Chinchilla 57'; Hernández 82'; Sainz 90' |

Estadio Universitario, San Nicolás de los Garza
Referee: Priscila Eritzel Pérez (Guanajuato)

Pumas UNAM won 3–7 on aggregate.

10 November 2026
20:00 MST (UTC−7)
21:00 CST (UTC−6)

| Juárez | 0–0 | Guadalajara |
|---|---|---|
| | Report |

Estadio Olímpico Benito Juárez, Ciudad Juárez
Referee: Erika Monserrat González (Durango)
14 November 2026
21:00 CST (UTC−6)

| Guadalajara | 1–1 | Juárez |
|---|---|---|
| Cervantes 36' | Report | Caicedo 15' |

Estadio Akron, Zapopan
Referee: Fernando Alexis Portillo (Chihuahua)

1–1 on aggregate. Guadalajara advanced due to being the higher seeded club.

==== Semi-finals ====
The first legs will be played on 9 and 10 December, and the second legs were played on 12 and 13 December 2026.

| Team 1 | Agg. | Team 2 | 1st leg | 2nd leg |
|---|---|---|---|---|
| América | – | Pumas UNAM | – | – |
| Monterrey | – | Guadalajara | – | – |

9–10 December 2026

| Pumas UNAM | v | América |

12–13 December 2026

| América | v | Pumas UNAM |

9–10 December 2026

| Guadalajara | v | Monterrey |

12–13 December 2026

| Monterrey | v | Guadalajara |

== Torneo Clausura ==
The Torneo Clausura 2027 is the second tournament of the season. The tournament will begin on January 2027.
