= Dania Padilla =

Mexican footballer (born 1995)

Personal information
- Full name: Dania Belén Padilla Alemán
- Date of birth: 22 December 1995 (age 30)
- Place of birth: Naucalpan de Juárez, State of Mexico, Mexico
- Height: 1.57 m (5 ft 2 in)
- Position: Defensive midfielder

Team information
- Current team: Santos Laguna
- Number: 24

Senior career*
Years	Team	Apps	(Gls)
2017–2025	UNAM	191	(15)
2025–2026	Santos Laguna	17	(0)
- * Club domestic league appearances and goals as of 6 February 2026 ‡ National team caps and goals as of 12 March 2022

Dania Belén Padilla Alemán (born 22 Decemnber 1995) is a Mexican professional footballer who plays as a Defensive midfielder for Liga MX Femenil side UNAM.

== Career ==
In 2017, she started her career in UNAM. As of 2025, she is the captain of the team and the most capped player in the history.
