= Gabriela Herrera =

Mexican footballer (born 1990)

Personal information
- Full name: Gabriela Elizabeth Herrera Arzola
- Date of birth: 17 September 1990 (age 36)
- Place of birth: Monterrey, Nuevo León, Mexico
- Height: 1.76 m (5 ft 9 in)
- Position: Goalkeeper

Senior career*
Years	Team	Apps	(Gls)
2018–2019	León	18	(0)
2019–2020	Cruz Azul	9	(0)
2021	Juárez	9	(0)
2022	Gimnasia y Esgrima (LP)		
2023	Ferro Carril Oeste		
2024–2025	Santos Laguna	26	(0)
- * Club domestic league appearances and goals as of 4 June 2023 ‡ National team caps and goals as of 12 March 2022

Gabriela Elizabeth Herrera Arzola (born 17 September 1990) is a Mexican professional footballer who plays as a goalkeeper for Liga MX Femenil side Santos Laguna .

== Career ==
In 2018, she started her career in León. In 2019, she was transferred to Cruz Azul . In 2021, she joined to Juárez . In 2022, she moved to Gimnasia y Esgrima (LP), and the next season she got transferred to Ferro Carril Oeste. Since 2024, she is part of Santos Laguna.
