= Elena Sainz =

Mexican footballer (born 2001)

Personal information
- Full name: María Elena Sainz Agama
- Date of birth: 4 May 2001 (age 25)
- Place of birth: Tepeaca, Puebla, Mexico
- Height: 1.61 m (5 ft 3 in)
- Position: Left-back

Team information
- Current team: UNAM
- Number: 4

Senior career*
| Years | Team | Apps | (Gls) |
| 2018–2019 | Puebla | 31 | (0) |
| 2019–2020 | Cruz Azul | 18 | (0) |
| 2021–2024 | Puebla | 97 | (7) |
| 2024–2026 | Atlas | 57 | (0) |
| 2026– | UNAM | 0 | (0) |
- * Club domestic league appearances and goals as of 6 February 2026 ‡ National team caps and goals as of 12 March 2022

María Elena Sainz Agama (born 4 May 2001) is a Mexican professional footballer who plays as a Left-back for Liga MX Femenil side UNAM.

== Career ==
In 2018, she started her career in Puebla. In 2019 she joined Cruz Azul. In 2024 she was transferred Atlas.
