= Jennifer Amaro =

Mexican footballer (born 2000)

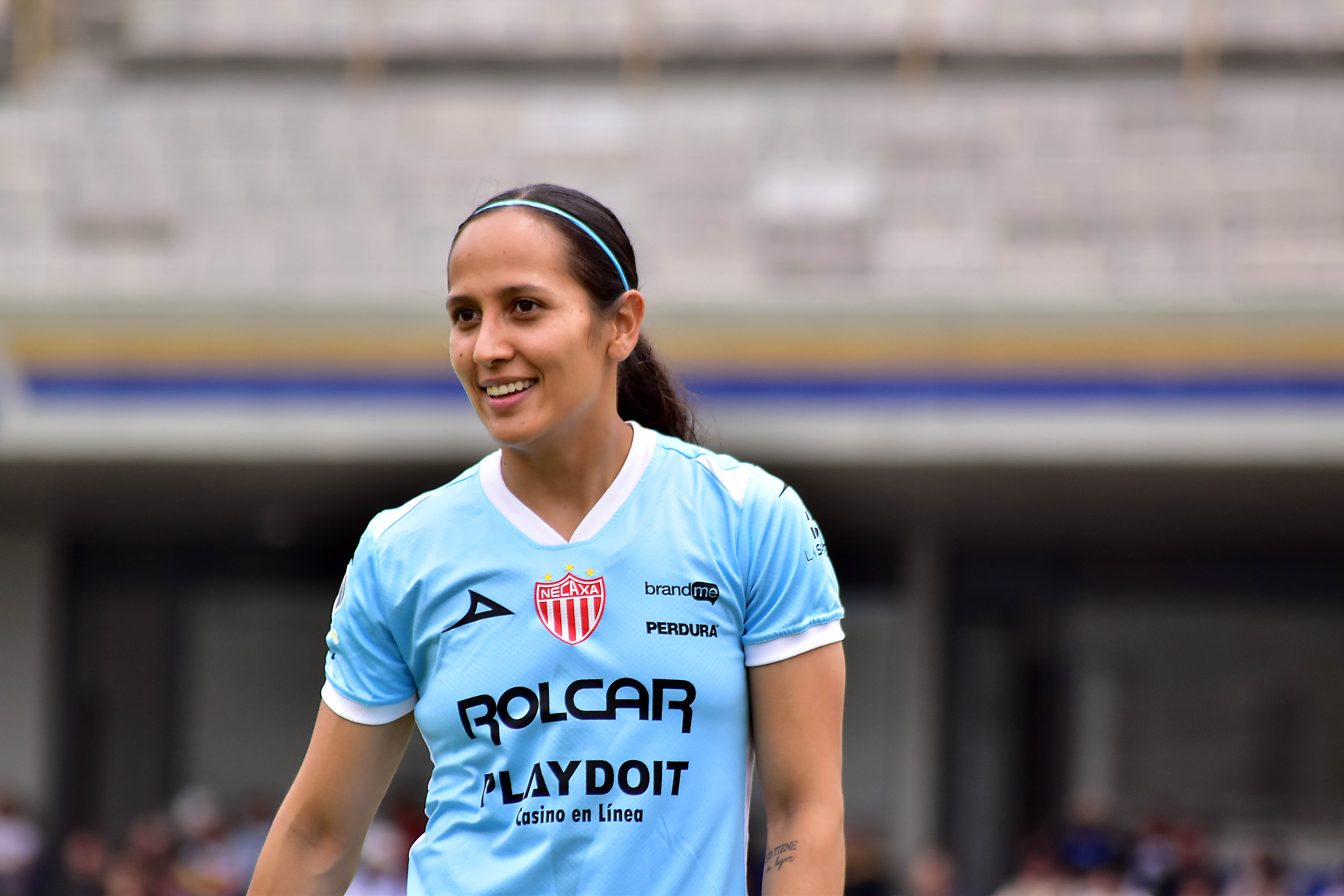

Personal information
- Full name: Jennifer Amaro Espinosa
- Date of birth: 18 August 2000 (age 26)
- Place of birth: Miguel Hidalgo, Mexico City, Mexico
- Height: 1.62 m (5 ft 4 in)
- Position: Goalkeeper

Team information
- Current team: Atlante
- Number: 25

College career
Years	Team	Apps	(Gls)
2022	Bellevue University		

Senior career*
Years	Team	Apps	(Gls)
2023	Mazatlán	15	(0)
2024	Cruz Azul	18	(0)
2025–2026	Necaxa	20	(0)
2026–	Atlante	0	(0)

International career^{‡}
2024	Mexico (beach soccer)		
- * Club domestic league appearances and goals as of 2 February 2026 ‡ National team caps and goals as of 12 March 2022

Jennifer Amaro Espinosa (born 18 August 2000) is a Mexican professional footballer who plays as a goalkeeper for Liga MX Femenil side Atlante.

== Career ==
In 2023, she started her career in Mazatlán. In 2024, she got transferred to Cruz Azul. In 2025, she joined Necaxa.

== International career ==
Amaro represented Mexico at the Beach Soccer Cup 2024.
