= Michel Ruíz =

Mexican footballer (born 2003)

Personal information
- Full name: Michel Anahy Ruíz Castañeda
- Date of birth: 4 September 2003 (age 23)
- Place of birth: Guadalupe, Nuevo León, Mexico
- Height: 1.57 m (5 ft 2 in)
- Position: Winger

Senior career*
Years	Team	Apps	(Gls)
2021–2023	UANL	18	(0)
2023–2026	Santos Laguna	54	(5)
- * Club domestic league appearances and goals as of 5 February 2026 ‡ National team caps and goals as of 12 March 2022

Michel Anahy Ruíz Castañeda (born 4 September 2003) is a Mexican professional footballer who plays as a Winger for Liga MX Femenil side Santos Laguna.

== Career ==
In 2021, she started her career in UANL. In 2022, she signed with Santos Laguna.
