= Bibiana Quintos =

Mexican footballer (born 2000)

Personal information
- Full name: Bibiana Guadalupe Quintos Galván
- Date of birth: 8 July 2000 (age 26)
- Place of birth: Miguel Hidalgo, Mexico City, Mexico
- Height: 1.60 m (5 ft 3 in)
- Position: Left back

Team information
- Current team: Atlas
- Number: 28

Senior career*
Years	Team	Apps	(Gls)
2018–2023	UNAM	146	(2)
2024–2026	Tijuana	60	(1)
2026–	Atlas	0	(0)
- * Club domestic league appearances and goals as of 9 February 2026

Bibiana Guadalupe Quintos Galván (born 8 July 2000) is a Mexican professional footballer who plays as a Left back for Liga MX Femenil side Atlas.

== Club career ==
In 2018, she started her career in UNAM. Since 2024, she is part of Tijuana.
