= Nailea Vidrio =

Mexican footballer (born 2003)

Personal information
- Full name: Dalia Nailea Vidrio Sahagún
- Date of birth: 10 March 2003 (age 23)
- Place of birth: Guadalajara, Jalisco, Mexico
- Height: 1.64 m (5 ft 5 in)
- Position: Winger

Team information
- Current team: Atlante
- Number: 6

Senior career*
Years	Team	Apps	(Gls)
2017–2020	Pachuca	14	(0)
2020–2022	León	49	(3)
2022–2023	Cruz Azul	8	(0)
2023–2025	Pachuca	16	(0)
2026–	Atlante	0	(0)
- * Club domestic league appearances and goals as of 4 June 2023 ‡ National team caps and goals as of 12 March 2022

Dalia Nailea Vidrio Sahagún (born 10 March 2003) is a Mexican professional footballer who plays as a Winger for Liga MX Femenil side Pachuca.

== Career ==
In 2017, she started her career in Pachuca. In 2020, she was transferred to León. In 2022, she joined to Cruz Azul. In 2023, she returned to Pachuca.

== Personal life ==
Nailea is the daughter of former footballer Manuel Vidrio, who also played with C.F. Pachuca. She also holds American citizenship.
