= Alexia Villanueva =

Mexican footballer (born 2003)

- Villanueva in 2021

Personal information
- Full name: Alexia Nayeli Villanueva Flores
- Date of birth: 22 February 2003 (age 23)
- Place of birth: Gustavo A. Madero, Mexico City, Mexico
- Height: 1.63 m (5 ft 4 in)
- Position: Striker

Team information
- Current team: Atlante
- Number: 22

Senior career*
Years	Team	Apps	(Gls)
2018–2020	América	14	(3)
2020–2023	Santos Laguna	91	(69)
2023	UANL	5	(0)
2024	Santos Laguna	22	(1)
2025–2026	León	31	(5)
2026–	Atlante	12	(1)

International career^{‡}
2022	Mexico U-20		
- * Club domestic league appearances and goals as of 30 October 2026 ‡ National team caps and goals as of 14 July 2023

Alexia Nayeli Villanueva Flores (born 22 February 2003) is a Mexican professional footballer who plays as a striker for Liga MX Femenil side Atlante.

== Career ==
Villanueva started her career in 2018 with América. In 2020, she joined Santos Laguna. In 2023, she was transferred to UANL. In 2024, she returned to Santos Laguna.

== International career ==
Villanueva was also part of the team that participated in the 2022 FIFA U-20 Women's World Cup in Costa Rica.
