= Alexa Huerta =

Mexican footballer (born 2004)

Personal information
- Full name: Alexa Tlalli Huerta Vega
- Date of birth: 14 June 2004 (age 22)
- Place of birth: California, United States
- Height: 1.61 m (5 ft 3 in)
- Position: Defensive midfielder

Team information
- Current team: UNAM
- Number: 26

College career
Years	Team	Apps	(Gls)
2022–2024	Houston Christian Huskies	48	(12)

Senior career*
Years	Team	Apps	(Gls)
2025	Atlas	31	(0)
2026–	UNAM	5	(0)

International career
2025–	Mexico U23		
- * Club domestic league appearances and goals as of 31 January 2026

Alexa Tlalli Huerta Vega (born 14 June 2004) is a professional footballer who plays as a Defensive midfielder for Liga MX Femenil side UNAM. Born and raised in the United States, she represents Mexico internationally.

== Career ==
Huerta started her career in 2025 with Atlas. Afterwards, she signed for UNAM in 2026.

== International career ==
Since 2025, Huerta has been part of the Mexico U-23 team.
