= Karen Becerril =

Mexican footballer (born 2000)

Personal information
- Full name: Karen Becerril Zepeda
- Date of birth: 12 May 2000 (age 26)
- Place of birth: Temoaya State of Mexico, Mexico
- Height: 1.54 m (5 ft 1 in)
- Position: Winger

Team information
- Current team: Atlante
- Number: 8

Senior career*
| Years | Team | Apps | (Gls) |
| 2018–2023 | Toluca | 137 | (14) |
| 2024–2026 | UNAM | 66 | (2) |
| 2026– | Atlante | 0 | (0) |
- * Club domestic league appearances and goals as of 31 January 2026 ‡ National team caps and goals as of 12 March 2022

Karen Becerril Zepeda (born 12 May 2000) is a Mexican professional footballer who plays as a Midfielder for Lig Femenil side Atlante.

In 2018, she started her career in Toluca. In 2024, she was transferred to UNAM. On 29 July 2026, Atlante announced that Becerril would play for the team in Atlante's inaugural season in Liga Femenil.
