= Fátima Delgado =

Mexican footballer (born 2000)

Personal information
- Full name: Fátima Del Carmen Delgado Cortés
- Date of birth: 25 November 2000 (age 25)
- Place of birth: Guadalajara Jalisco, Mexico
- Height: 1.60 m (5 ft 3 in)
- Position: Left back

Team information
- Current team: Atlas
- Number: 22

Senior career*
Years	Team	Apps	(Gls)
2018–2020	Atlas	47	(0)
2021–2025	Querétaro	130	(3)
2025–2026	UNAM	11	(0)
2026–	Atlas	0	(0)
- * Club domestic league appearances and goals as of 31 January 2026

Fátima Del Carmen Delgado Cortés (born 25 November 2000) is a Mexican professional footballer who plays as a Left back for Liga MX Femenil side Atlas.

In 2018, she started her career in Atlas. In 2021, she signed with Querétaro. In 2025, she was transferred to UNAM.
