= Andrea González Salinas =

Mexican footballer (born 1993)

Personal information
- Full name: Andrea González Salinas
- Date of birth: 30 November 1993 (age 32)
- Place of birth: Tejupilco, State of Mexico, Mexico
- Height: 1.64 m (5 ft 5 in)
- Positions: Defensive midfielder; centre-back

Team information
- Current team: Atlante
- Number: 10

Senior career*
Years	Team	Apps	(Gls)
2017	Santos Laguna	3	(0)
2018–2019	Querétaro	18	(0)
2023–2024	Puebla	34	(1)
2024	Tijuana	10	(1)
2025–2026	León	22	(0)
2026–	Atlante	0	(0)
- * Club domestic league appearances and goals as of 9 February 2026 ‡ National team caps and goals as of 12 March 2022

Andrea González Salinas (born 30 November 1993) is a Mexican professional footballer who plays as a Defensive midfielder for Liga MX Femenil side León.

== Club career ==
In 2017, she started her career in Santos Laguna. In 2018, she was transferred to Querétaro. In 2023, she joined Puebla. In 2024, she signed with Tijuana. Since 2025 she is part of León.
