= Ivonne González =

Mexican footballer (born 2005)

Personal information
- Full name: Ivonne Areli González Rendón
- Date of birth: 10 October 2005 (age 21)
- Place of birth: Guadalajara, Jalisco, Mexico
- Height: 1.57 m (5 ft 2 in)
- Position: Attacking midfielder

Team information
- Current team: Santos Laguna (on loan from Guadalajara)
- Number: 24

Youth career
- 2021–2023: Guadalajara

Senior career*
| Years | Team | Apps | (Gls) |
| 2023– | Guadalajara | 35 | (2) |
| 2026– | → Santos Laguna (loan) | 0 | (0) |

International career^{‡}
| 2023– | Mexico U-20 | | |
- * Club domestic league appearances and goals as of 4 June 2023 ‡ National team caps and goals as of 12 March 2022

Ivonne Areli González Rendón (born 10 October 2005) is a Mexican professional footballer who plays as an attacking midfielder for Liga MX Femenil side Santos Laguna.

== Career ==
In 2023, she started her career in Guadalajara.

== International career ==
Since 2023, González has been part of the Mexico U-20 team.
