= Alejandra Guerrero =

Mexican footballer (born 2004)

Personal information
- Full name: Alejandra Guerrero Camacho
- Date of birth: 19 August 2004 (age 22)
- Place of birth: Álvaro Obregón, Mexico City, Mexico
- Height: 1.57 m (5 ft 2 in)
- Position: Winger

Team information
- Current team: UNAM
- Number: 16

Senior career*
Years	Team	Apps	(Gls)
2021	Puebla	0	(0)
2021–2023	Necaxa	38	(2)
2024–	UNAM	83	(13)
- * Club domestic league appearances and goals as of 31 January 2026 ‡ National team caps and goals as of 12 March 2022

Alejandra Guerrero Camacho (born 19 August 2004) is a Mexican professional footballer who plays as a Winger for Liga MX Femenil side UNAM.

== Career ==
In 2021, she started her career in Puebla, the next season she joined Necaxa. In 2024, she was transferred to UNAM.
