= Diego Testas =

Mexican football manager

Personal information
- Full name: Diego Testas Fernández
- Date of birth: 9 December 1983 (age 42)
- Place of birth: Miguel Hidalgo, Mexico City, Mexico
- Height: 1.75 m (5 ft 9 in)

Managerial career
- Years: Team
- 2021–2024: Nacional (women)
- 2024: Universidad de Chile (women)
- 2025–2026: Cruz Azul (women)

Diego Testas Fernández (born 9 December 1983) is a Mexican-born Uruguayan football manager who most recently managed Liga MX Femenil club Cruz Azul.

== Career ==
Testas started his career in the Nacional ahead of the 2021 season. In 2024, Testas was named the head coach of Universidad de Chile. In 2025, Testas was appointed as manager of Cruz Azul in the Liga MX Femenil.
