= Karen De León =

Mexican footballer (born 1999)

Personal information
- Full name: Karen Lucía De León Pescador
- Date of birth: 26 August 1999 (age 27)
- Place of birth: Durango City, Durango, Mexico
- Height: 1.66 m (5 ft 5 in)
- Position: Centre-back

Team information
- Current team: Santos Laguna
- Number: 11

Senior career*
Years	Team	Apps	(Gls)
2017–2018	León	11	(0)
2022–2025	Necaxa	166	(1)
2026	Mazatlán	7	(0)
2026–	Santos Laguna	0	(0)
- * Club domestic league appearances and goals as of 9 February 2026 ‡ National team caps and goals as of 12 March 2022

Karen Lucía De León Pescador (born 26 August 1999) is a Mexican professional footballer who plays as a centre-back for Liga MX Femenil side Santos Laguna.

== Career ==
In 2017, she started her career in León. In 2022, she got transferred to Necaxa.
