= Havi Ibarra =

Mexican footballer (born 2003)

Personal information
- Full name: Havi Larisa Ibarra Hernández
- Date of birth: 23 April 2003 (age 23)
- Place of birth: Tlalnepantla de Baz, State of Mexico, Mexico
- Height: 1.59 m (5 ft 3 in)
- Position: Left-back

Team information
- Current team: Santos Laguna
- Number: 6

Senior career*
Years	Team	Apps	(Gls)
2019–2021	Toluca	34	(0)
2021	Sol de América		
2022	Mazatlán	25	(2)
2024–	Santos Laguna	45	(1)
- * Club domestic league appearances and goals as of 5 February 2026 ‡ National team caps and goals as of 12 March 2022

Havi Larisa Ibarra Hernández (born 23 April 2003) is a Mexican professional footballer who plays as a Left-back for Liga MX Femenil side Santos Laguna.

== Career ==
In 2019, she started her career in Toluca. In 2021, she was transferred to Sol de América. In 2022, she joined to Mazatlán. Since 2024, she is part of Santos Laguna.
