= Lia Romero =

Mexican footballer (born 2000)

Personal information
- Full name: Lia Mariel Romero Torres
- Date of birth: 27 July 2000 (age 26)
- Place of birth: Zapopan, Jalisco, Mexico
- Height: 1.64 m (5 ft 5 in)
- Position: Winger

Team information
- Current team: Santos Laguna
- Number: 20

Senior career*
Years	Team	Apps	(Gls)
2017–2022	Guadalajara	29	(0)
2022–	Santos Laguna	101	(13)
- * Club domestic league appearances and goals as of 5 February 2026 ‡ National team caps and goals as of 12 March 2022

Lia Mariel Romero Torres (born 27 July 2000) is a Mexican professional footballer who plays as a Winger for Liga MX Femenil side Santos Laguna.

== Career ==
In 2017, she started her career in Guadalajara. In 2022, she signed with Santos Laguna.
