= Samantha Calvillo =

Mexican footballer (born 2003)

Personal information
- Full name: Samantha Kassandra Calvillo Hernández
- Date of birth: 30 June 2003 (age 23)
- Place of birth: Aguascalientes City, Aguascalientes, Mexico
- Height: 1.65 m (5 ft 5 in)
- Position: Striker

Team information
- Current team: Santos Laguna
- Number: 9

Senior career*
Years	Team	Apps	(Gls)
2019–2023	Necaxa	108	(7)
2023–2024	Toluca	39	(5)
2025	Necaxa	29	(10)
2026–	Santos Laguna	16	(3)
- * Club domestic league appearances and goals as of 5 February 2026 ‡ National team caps and goals as of 12 March 2022

Samantha Kassandra Calvillo Hernández (born 30 June 2003) is a Mexican professional footballer who plays as a Striker for Liga MX Femenil side Santos Laguna.

In 2017, she started her career in Necaxa. In 2023, she signed with Toluca. In 2026, she joined Santos Laguna.
