= Andrea González =

Andrea González may refer to:

- Andrea González Nader (born 1987), Ecuadorian environmentalist and politician, 2025 presidential candidate
- Andrea González Salinas, Mexican footballer
- Andrea González Romo, contestant on Mexican television talent show La Academia in 2002
