= Sydney Stephens =

American soccer player (born 2002)

Personal information
- Full name: Sydney Ann Stephens
- Date of birth: April 9, 2002 (age 24)
- Place of birth: Waterloo, Illinois, U.S.
- Height: 5 ft 5 in (1.65 m)
- Position: Forward

Team information
- Current team: Atlas
- Number: 26

College career
Years	Team	Apps	(Gls)
2021–2025	Illinois Fighting Illini	76	(12)

Senior career*
Years	Team	Apps	(Gls)
2026	Sligo Rovers	11	(9)
2026–	Atlas	5	(0)
- * Club domestic league appearances and goals as of 18 October 2026

Sydney Ann Stephens (born 9 April 2002) is an American professional soccer player who plays as a forward for Liga Femenil club Atlas. She played college soccer for the Illinois Fighting Illini.

== Club career ==
Stephens played college soccer with Illinois Fighting Illini from 2021 until 2025.

Stephens was one of 6 played who moved from America to join Irish professional club Sligo Rovers ahead of the 2026 League of Ireland Women's Premier Division season, she scored 11 goals in 15 games for the club including a Hat-Trick in a 5–1 win over Bohemian, she won the league player of the month for the month of May.

After her successful stint in Ireland, Stephens earned a professional contract with Mexican club Atlas on a contract upwards of €42,000 per year, signing a two-year deal. She also turned down an offer from Portugal before joining the Guadalajara-based club.

== Personal life ==
Stephens was born in Waterloo, Illinois, but has family from Ireland and it was reported by Irish newspapers that she is "currently exploring her international eligibility".
