= Jhonathan Lazcano =

Mexican football manager (born 1992)

Personal information
- Full name: Jhonathan Omar Lazcano Solórzano
- Date of birth: 12 September 1992 (age 34)
- Place of birth: Mexico City, Mexico
- Height: 1.82 m (6 ft 0 in)

Team information
- Current team: Santos Laguna (women) (manager)

Youth career
- Years: Team
- 2008–2009: Venados
- 2011–2012: Plateros F.C.

Managerial career
- 2017–2021: UNAM (women) (Assistant)
- 2021–2022: UNAM U-20 (women)
- 2023: UNAM (women)
- 2024: Chamas FC (AQL)
- 2025–: Santos Laguna (women)

Jhonathan Omar Lazcano Solórzano (born 12 September 1992) is a Mexican manager who has been the manager for Santos Laguna (women) since 2025.

== Coaching career ==
Lazcano started his coaching career as assistant of Ileana Dávila in UNAM (women), from 2017–2021. In 2023, Lazcano was promoted as head coach. In 2024, he was named the coach of Chamas FC in the Queens League Américas. In 2025, Lazcano was appointed as manager of Santos Laguna (women) in the Liga MX Femenil.
