= Renata Huerta =

Mexican footballer (born 2004)

Personal information
- Full name: Renata Fernanda Huerta Tovar
- Date of birth: 8 March 2004 (age 22)
- Place of birth: Cuauhtémoc, Mexico City, Mexico
- Height: 1.58 m (5 ft 2 in)
- Position: Attacking midfielder

Team information
- Current team: Atlas
- Number: 8

Senior career*
Years	Team	Apps	(Gls)
2020–2021	América	11	(0)
2022–2025	Cruz Azul	104	(6)
2025–	Atlas	23	(7)
- * Club domestic league appearances and goals as of 6 February 2026 ‡ National team caps and goals as of 12 March 2022

Renata Fernanda Huerta Tovar (born 8 March 2004) is a Mexican professional footballer who plays as a Attacking midfielder for Liga MX Femenil side Atlas.

== Club career ==
In 2018, she started her career in América. In 2022, she joined Cruz Azul. In 2025, she was transferred to Atlas.

== International career ==
Since 2025, Huerta has been part of the Mexico U-23 team.
