= Linda Frías =

Footballer (born 1997)

- Frías in 2021

Personal information
- Full name: Linda Frías Zelaya
- Date of birth: 14 April 1997 (age 29)
- Place of birth: California, United States
- Height: 1.70 m (5 ft 7 in)
- Position: Forward

Youth career
- Orange Panthers

College career
Years	Team	Apps	(Gls)
2015	Bethesda Flames	12	(3)
2017	Santa Ana Dons	21	(7)

Senior career*
Years	Team	Apps	(Gls)
2019–2020	Alianza		
2021	Santos Laguna	6	(0)

International career^{‡}
2021	El Salvador	1	(0)
- * Club domestic league appearances and goals as of 8 February 2021 ‡ National team caps and goals as of 8 April 2021

Linda Frías Zelaya (born 14 April 1997) is a US-born Mexican–Salvadoran footballer who plays as a forward for the El Salvador women's national team.

== Early life ==
Frías was born and raised in Southern California, having lived in Anaheim, to a Mexican father and a Salvadoran mother.

== High school and college career ==
Frías' high school and college career was entirely in California. She has attended the Orange High School in Orange, the Bethesda University in Anaheim and the Santa Ana College in Santa Ana.

== Club career ==
Frías has played for Alianza FC in El Salvador, whom she joined in 2019, and for Santos Laguna in Mexico.

== International career ==
Frías made her senior debut for El Salvador on 8 April 2021.

== See also ==
- List of El Salvador women's international footballers
