= Nicolás Morales =

Mexican football manager (born 1966)

Personal information
- Full name: Nicolás Israel Morales González
- Date of birth: 5 May 1966 (age 60)
- Place of birth: Guadalajara, Jalisco, Mexico
- Height: 1.73 m (5 ft 8 in)
- Position: Centre-back

Senior career*
| Years | Team | Apps | (Gls) |
| 1986–1990 | UdeG | | |
| 1990–1992 | Tecos | | |
| 1993–1994 | UdeG | | |
| 1995 | Necaxa | | |
| 1996–1997 | Guadalajara | | |

Managerial career
- 2005: Tigres Los Mochis (Assistant)
- 2006–2007: Querétaro (Assistant)
- 2007–2008: Tecos (Assistant)
- 2008: Necaxa (Assistant)
- 2009: León (Assistant)
- 2010: Necaxa Reserves and Academy
- 2011: Toluca (Assistant)
- 2012–2013: Necaxa (Assistant)
- 2014: UAT (Assistant)
- 2014: Tigres Blancos de Bengala
- 2014: Selección Tercera División (Assistant)
- 2016–2017: Guadalajara Reserves and Academy
- 2017: Atlético San Luis (Assistant)
- 2022: Cruz Azul Reserves and Academy
- 2023: Cruz Azul (women)
- 2024: Alfareros de Tonalá
- 2026: Mazatlán (women)
- 2026: Atlante (women)
- * Club domestic league appearances and goals

Nicolás Israel Morales González (born 5 May 1966) is a Mexican football manager. He is a former professional footballer, who played as a Centre-back.

== Playing career ==
He began his career in UdeG. In 1996, he joined Guadalajara.

== Managerial career ==
From 2005 to 2014 he was part of the technical staff of several Liga MX teams, being a frequent collaborator of Jaime Ordiales. In 2023, he was named coach of Cruz Azul (women). In 2026, he signed as coach of Mazatlán (women).
