= Alberto Aguilar (Mexican footballer) =

Mexican footballer and manager (born 1960)

Personal information
- Full name: Alberto Aguilar Mijes
- Date of birth: 3 September 1960 (age 66)
- Place of birth: Tampico, Tamaulipas, Mexico
- Height: 1.86 m (6 ft 1 in)
- Position: Goalkeeper

Senior career*
Years	Team	Apps	(Gls)
1979–1980	León	18	(2)
1980–1983	Coyotes Neza	87	(0)
1984–1985	Tampico Madero	2	(0)
1986–1989	Puebla	93	(0)
1989–1990	Cobras de Ciudad Juárez	22	(0)
1990–1992	Cruz Azul	61	(0)
1992–1994	Morelia	49	(0)
1994–1995	UANL	1	(0)

Managerial career
- 1997–1998: Tigres UANL (Assistant)
- 2001: Comunicaciones
- 2006–2010: Mexico (Goalkeeper trainer)
- 2006–2007: Tigres UANL (Assistant)
- 2011: León (Assistant)
- 2011: Toluca (Assistant)
- 2012–2014: Monterrey (Assistant)
- 2017–2018: Cruz Azul (Women)
- * Club domestic league appearances and goals

Alberto Aguilar Mejía (born 3 September 1960) is a Mexican former professional footballer and manager.

== Honours ==
Individual

- Toulon Tournament Best Goalkeeper: 1978
