= Roberto Pérez (Mexican footballer) =

Mexican footballer and manager (born 1968)

Personal information
- Full name: Carlos Roberto Pérez Loarca
- Date of birth: 12 July 1968 (age 58)
- Place of birth: Querétaro City, Querétaro, Mexico
- Height: 1.78 m (5 ft 10 in)
- Position: Goalkeeper

Senior career*
| Years | Team | Apps | (Gls) |
| 2000–2001 | Cruz Azul | 10 | (0) |

Managerial career
- 2008–2009: Cruz Azul (Assistant)
- 2011–2012: Cruz Azul (Goalkeeper coach)
- 2015–2016: Cruz Azul (Assistant)
- 2017–2019: Cruz Azul Reserves and Academy
- 2019–2020: Cruz Azul Hidalgo
- 2021–2022: Cruz Azul (women)
- 2024–2025: Mazatlán (women)
- * Club domestic league appearances and goals

Carlos Roberto Pérez Loarca (Note: In this Spanish name, the first or paternal surname is Pérez and the second or maternal family name is Loarca.) (born July 12, 1968) is a Mexican football manager and former player. He was born in Querétaro City, Querétaro.
