= Diana García (footballer) =

Mexican footballer (born 1999)

Personal information
- Full name: Diana Laura García Castillo
- Date of birth: 11 November 1999 (age 27)
- Place of birth: San Luis Potosí, San Luis Potosí, Mexico
- Height: 1.67 m (5 ft 5 1/2 in)
- Position: Defensive midfielder

Team information
- Current team: Monterrey
- Number: 22

Senior career*
Years	Team	Apps	(Gls)
2017–2018	Pachuca	19	(2)
2018–2020	León	57	(10)
2020–	Monterrey	170	(21)

International career^{‡}
2020–	Mexico	23	(3)
Medal record
Women's football
Representing Mexico
Central American and Caribbean Games
Gold medal – first place	2023 San Salvador
- * Club domestic league appearances and goals as of 1 February 2026 ‡ National team caps and goals as of 19 February 2025

Diana Laura García Castillo (born 11 November 1999) is a Mexican footballer who plays as an attacking midfielder for Liga MX Femenil side Monterrey and the Mexico women's national team.

== International career ==
García made her senior debut for Mexico on 5 March 2020 in a 1–1 friendly draw against Croatia.

== International goals ==
No.	Date	Venue	Opponent	Score	Result	Competition
1.	17 February 2022	Estadio Universitario, San Nicolás de los Garza, Mexico	Suriname	5–0	9–0	2022 CONCACAF W Championship qualification
2.	28 June 2022	Cancha de Entrenamiento TSM, Torreón, Mexico	Peru	3–0	3–0	Friendly
