= Joaquín Moreno =

Mexican footballer and manager (born 1973)

Personal information
- Full name: Joaquín Moreno Garduño
- Date of birth: 22 May 1973 (age 53)
- Place of birth: Mexico City, Mexico
- Height: 1.69 m (5 ft 6 1/2 in)
- Position: Midfielder

Team information
- Current team: Cruz Azul (women) (interim)

Youth career
- Cruz Azul

Senior career*
| Years | Team | Apps | (Gls) |
| 1996–2001 | Cruz Azul | 76 | (1) |
| 2001–2003 | Puebla | 53 | (0) |
| 2003–2004 | Querétaro | 20 | (0) |

Managerial career
- 2009–2013: Cruz Azul Reserves
- 2014–2015: Cruz Azul Hidalgo
- 2015: Cruz Azul (interim)
- 2016: Cruz Azul (interim)
- 2016–2020: Cruz Azul (assistant)
- 2019: Cruz Azul (interim)
- 2021: Cruz Azul Hidalgo
- 2022: Mineros de Fresnillo
- 2023: Cruz Azul Reserves
- 2023: Cruz Azul (interim)
- 2023: Cruz Azul (assistant)
- 2023: Cruz Azul
- 2025: Cruz Azul U21
- 2026: Cruz Azul U21 (assistant)
- 2026–: Cruz Azul (women) (interim)
- * Club domestic league appearances and goals

Joaquín Moreno Garduño (born May 22, 1973) is a Mexican football manager and former player who is currently serving as interim manager of Liga Femenil club Cruz Azul.

== Playing career ==
Born in Mexico City, Mexico, Moreno began his football career at Cruz Azul, where he played as a midfielder. He was promoted to the first team in 1996 and remained with the club until 2001, making 76 league appearances and scoring one goal. During his time with Cruz Azul, he won several titles, including the Invierno 1997 Mexican Primera División, the 1996–97 Copa México, and the CONCACAF Champions' Cup in 1996 and 1997.

Following his spell at Cruz Azul, Moreno moved to Puebla in 2001, where he played for two seasons. He later joined Querétaro for the 2003–2004 season, retiring from professional football shortly thereafter.

== Coaching career ==
After retiring as a player, Moreno returned to Cruz Azul in 2009 to begin his post-playing career, initially working with the club's youth and reserve teams. Over the years, he held various positions within the club, including head coach of Cruz Azul Hidalgo. He was also named interim first-team manager on four occasions, stepping in during periods of managerial transition.

In addition to his roles at Cruz Azul, Moreno managed Mineros de Fresnillo during the 2022 season, gaining further experience in Liga Premier de México.

On 8 August 2023, Moreno was named the permanent head coach of Cruz Azul's first team, marking the first time he held the position on a non-interim basis. However, his tenure ended on 19 December, when he stepped down from the role following the conclusion of the Apertura 2023. Shortly afterward, Moreno was appointed director of the club's reserves and academy system.

== Honours ==
Cruz Azul

- Mexican Primera División: Invierno 1997
- Copa México: 1996–97
- CONCACAF Champions' Cup: 1996, 1997
