= Ileana Dávila =

Mexican football manager and former player

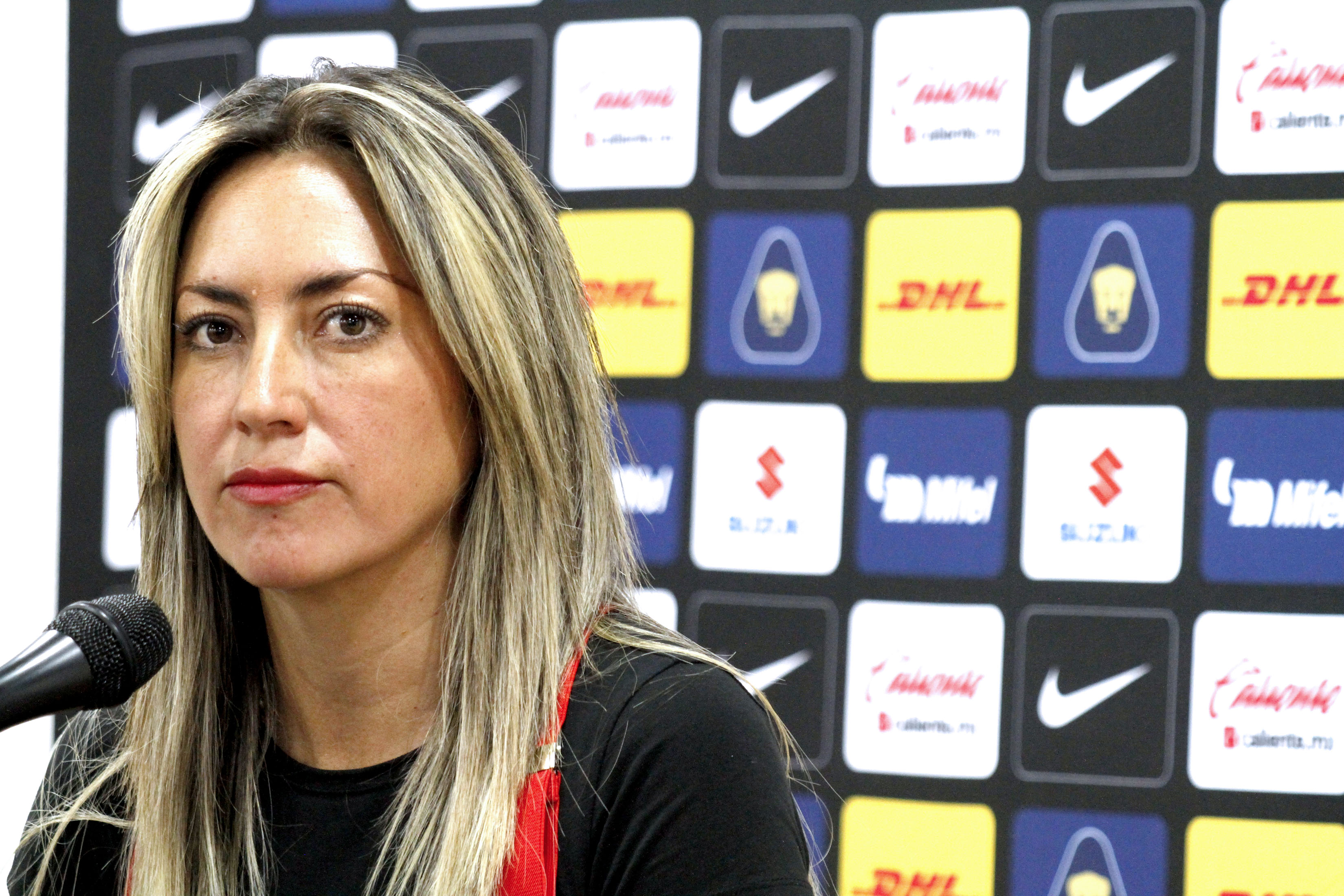
- Dávila as manager of UNAM in 2020

Personal information
- Full name: Ileana María Dávila Rodríguez
- Date of birth: 24 January 1975 (age 51)
- Place of birth: Córdoba, Mexico
- Height: 1.66 m (5 ft 5 1/2 in)

Team information
- Current team: Atlante (women) (Manager)

Managerial career
- Years: Team
- 2017: UNAM U13
- 2017–2021: UNAM (women)
- 2024: Los Aliens 1021 (AQL)
- 2025: Peluche Caligari (AQL)
- 2026: Atlante U-19 (women)
- 2026–: Atlante (women)

Ileana María Dávila Rodríguez (born 24 January 1975) is a Mexican football manager. Dávila currently works as a football analyst for Televisa Deportes Network.

== Career ==
=== Early career ===
Ileana Dávila was born on 24 January 1975 in Córdoba, Veracruz.

After seeing an ad in a newspaper for a football coach program, Dávila started her formation at the Mexican Football Federation school and she later successfully graduated from the program, being the only woman in her class.

She started her career coaching college and indoor football teams, and in 2017 she went to the Club Universidad Nacional looking for a job. Initially, Dávila asked to be the first team's kit manager, since UNAM did not have any women's football program at the moment, but club chairman Rodrigo Ares de Parga refused. Ares de Parga still hired her, but she was appointed as manager of UNAM's Academy lowest youth category, the U13, instead. Dávila was the first ever female football coach in any team of the Club Universidad Nacional.

=== UNAM Women ===
Back in December 2018, the Mexican Football Federation had created the Liga MX Femenil, Mexico's women's football top league, the league was set to start in July 2017. In April 2017, a few months behind the start of the season, Dávila was appointed manager of UNAM Women.

Dávila officially debuted as manager of UNAM Femenil on 10 March 2017 in a match of the 2017 Copa MX Femenil against UANL Women, which the team won 4–1. UNAM lost their two next matches against América and Monterrey and did not qualify to the knockout stage.

For the Apertura 2017, the Pumas UNAM finished seventh, therefore not qualifying to the playoffs. The club would have the exact same fate for the Clausura 2018.

For the 2018–19 season, Dávila lead the team to the playoffs on both the Apertura and Clausura tournaments, but were eliminated on quarterfinals twice.

On 21 May 2021, Dávila was removed as manager of Pumas. Dávila was considered by Monterrey Women as manager, but the team finally hired Eva Espejo.

== Managerial statistics ==
As of 14 March 2020

Managerial record by team and tenure
Team	From	To	Record								Ref
Team	From	To	G	W	D	L	GF	GA	GD	Win %	Ref
UNAM Women	3 May 2017	Present	90	36	25	29	118	85	+33	40.00	
