= Atlante F.C. (women) =

Association football club in Mexico

Atlante
- Full name: Atlante Fútbol Club Femenil S.A. de C.V.
- Nickname: Las Potras de Hierro (The Iron Colts)
- Short name: ATL
- Founded: 23 April 2026; 5 months ago
- Ground: CAR Atlante, field 1 Mexico City
- Capacity: TBA
- Owner: Grupo Dequivamed
- Chairman: Emilio Escalante
- Manager: Ileana Dávila
- League: Liga Femenil
- Website: www.atlantefutbol.com
Home colours	Away colours

Atlante Fútbol Club Femenil is a Mexican professional women's football club based in Mexico City. It plays in the Liga Femenil and is women's section of the Atlante men's team.

The team was founded on 23 April 2026, ahead of the 2026–27 Liga Femenil season, after Atlante, which was then playing in the Liga de Expansión (second-division) bought the Mazatlán’s Liga MX franchise and relocated it to Mexico City, therefore allowing the club to return to the Liga MX after twelve years. As a result, Atlante was required to assume all of Mazatlán's Liga MX responsibilities, including the obligation to field a respective women's team in the Liga MX Femenil.

== History ==
In November 2025, reports began to surface in Mexican sports media about the potential sale of the Mazatlán's Liga MX franchise to Liga de Expansión MX side Atlante and its relocation to Mexico City. On 9 December 2025, the head director of the Federación Mexicana de Fútbol (FMF), Mikel Arriola, confirmed that both Mazatlán and Atlante had reached an agreement in which Atlante would acquire through a sale the Mazatlán's franchise in Liga MX and its relocation to Mexico City, with the sale and relocation expected to close in the first half of 2026. The sale and relocation finally closed on 23 April 2026, allowing Atlante to play in the Liga MX beginning with the 2026–27 season after twelve years by taking Mazatlán's place.

As per Liga MX regulations, any team participating in the league must field a respective women's side in the Liga MX Femenil. Atlante began preparations to create its women's team in early 2026, with a formal player recruiting process beginning on March 5, 2026.

== Personnel ==
=== Management ===
Position	Staff
Sporting Chairman	(Mexico) Emilio Escalante

=== Coaching staff ===
Position	Staff
Manager	(Mexico) Ileana Dávila
Assistant manager	(Mexico) Juan Carlos Mendoza
Fitness coach	(Mexico) José Puerto
Physiotherapist	(Mexico) Daniela Canchola
Team doctor	(Mexico) Indira Benítez

== Players ==
=== First-team squad ===
As of 30 July 2026

Note: Flags indicate national team as defined under FIFA eligibility rules; some limited exceptions apply. Players may hold more than one non-FIFA nationality.

No.	Pos.	Nation	Player
1	GK	ESA	Riley Meléndez
2	DF	MEX	Ana Lorena Torres (on loan from Guadalajara)
3	DF	GUA	Elizabeth Estrada
4	DF	MEX	Vanessa Sánchez
5	DF	MEX	Selene Valera
6	MF	MEX	Nailea Vidrio
7	MF	MEX	Aleida Cruz
8	MF	MEX	Karen Becerril
9	FW	PHI	Chandler McDaniel
10	MF	MEX	Andrea González
11	MF	MEX	Vanessa González (on loan from Guadalajara)
13	MF	MEX	Alexeis Kirnos
14	MF	MEX	Sheila Vivanco
15	MF	MEX	Conni Herrera
16	FW	ESA	Samaria Gómez

No.	Pos.	Nation	Player
17	MF	MEX	Karoll López
18	DF	MEX	Sofía Macotela
19	MF	MEX	Citlalli Conchas (on loan from Guadalajara)
21	DF	MEX	Judith Félix
22	FW	MEX	Alexia Villanueva
23	DF	MEX	Ofelia Chávez
24	DF	MEX	Andrea Hernández
25	GK	MEX	Jennifer Amaro
26	FW	USA	Ricshya Walker
27	GK	USA	Enya Hernández
30	MF	MEX	Adriana Cruz
32	MF	MEX	Paulina Cortés
33	DF	MEX	Nataly Cárdenas
34	GK	MEX	Fátima de Miguel
35	FW	MEX	Rebeca Mercado
