= Juan Pablo Alfaro =

Mexican footballer (born 1979)

Personal information
- Full name: Juan Pablo Alfaro Guzmán
- Date of birth: 2 March 1979 (age 47)
- Place of birth: Guadalajara, Jalisco, Mexico
- Height: 1.77 m (5 ft 10 in)
- Position: Defensive midfielder

Team information
- Current team: Atlas (women) (Manager)

Senior career*
Years	Team	Apps	(Gls)
1999–2001	Guadalajara	29	(0)
2002	Toluca	1	(0)
2003–2005	Guadalajara	42	(0)
2006	Pachuca	16	(0)
2007–2010	Veracruz	20	(0)
2008	→ Atlético Mexiquense (loan)	15	(0)
2010	La Piedad	14	(2)
2010	Lobos BUAP	16	(1)
2011–2012	Leones Negros	35	(0)
2012–2013	Tecos	26	(0)
2013–2014	Oaxaca	21	(1)
2014	Tepic	1	(0)

Managerial career
- 2016–2020: Guadalajara Reserves and Academy
- 2020–2021: Guadalajara (women) (Assistant)
- 2022–2023: Guadalajara (women)
- 2023–2025: Tritones Vallarta
- 2025: Atlético Morelia (Assistant)
- 2026–: Atlas (women)
- * Club domestic league appearances and goals

Juan Pablo Alfaro Guzmán (born 2 March 1979) is a Mexican former footballer and manager.

== Career ==
Alfaro is known as "El Pato" (The Duck) to many fans. He started his career with Chivas de Guadalajara in 1999. He later moved on with Toluca in 2002. Alfaro returned to Chivas in 2003, and scored against Argentine superpower Boca Juniors in the 4-0 Chivas win. El Pato then moved to C.F. Pachuca, and then transferred in CD Veracruz. then to Toluca for a little bit but went back to Veracruz.

== Honours ==
Pachuca

- Copa Sudamericana: 2006
