= Atlas F.C. (women) =

Mexican women's football club

Atlas Femenil
- Full name: Atlas Fútbol Club Femenil
- Nicknames: Las Zorras (The Foxes); Las Rojinegras (The Red-and-Blacks); Las Académicas (The Academics); La Furia (The Fury)
- Founded: 2016; 10 years ago
- Ground: Estadio Jalisco; Guadalajara, Jalisco
- Capacity: 55,020
- Owner: Grupo PRODI
- Chairman: Gerardo Casanova
- Manager: Juan Pablo Alfaro
- League: Liga MX Femenil
- Clausura 2026: Regular phase: 14th Final phase: Did not qualify
- Website: https://www.atlasfc.com.mx
Home colours	Away colours

Atlas Fútbol Club Femenil is a professional Mexican women's football club based in Guadalajara, Jalisco. The club has been the women's section of Atlas since 2017. The team currently plays in the Liga Femenil which started in July 2017.

== Symbols ==
=== Shield ===
The red and black of the team's logo represent the martyr San Lorenzo, with the black representing his martyrdom and the red representing the blood he spilled; these colors also served as the base for the team's uniforms. The famous "A" on the shield logo was designed by Austrian painter and artist Carlos Stahl, who suggested the A as a crest over a red-and-black background.

== Personnel ==
=== Club administration ===
Position	Staff
Chairman	(Mexico) Gerardo Casanova
Sporting director	(Mexico) Maria Fernanda Delmar

=== Coaching staff ===
Position	Staff
Manager	(Mexico) Juan Pablo Alfaro
Assistant managers	(Mexico) Jair Chávez
Assistant managers	(Mexico) Roberto Hernández
Fitness coach	(Mexico) Fernando Zamarripa
Team doctor	(Mexico) Fabiola Zañudo
Assistant doctor	(Mexico) Salvador Romo

== Players ==
=== Current squad ===
As of July 30, 2026

Note: Flags indicate national team as defined under FIFA eligibility rules; some limited exceptions apply. Players may hold more than one non-FIFA nationality.

No.	Pos.	Nation	Player
1	GK	MEX	Karol Contreras
3	MF	ESA	Laila Saravia
5	DF	ESA	Vasthy Delgado
6	MF	MEX	Victoria Acevedo
7	FW	ECU	Karen Flores
8	MF	MEX	Renata Huerta
9	FW	MEX	Noemí Villalobos
11	FW	MEX	Sanjuana Muñóz
12	GK	MEX	Camila Vázquez
13	MF	MEX	Maritza Maldonado
14	MF	MEX	Cynthia Ramírez
15	DF	USA	Miranda Palacios
16	MF	MEX	Andrea Hernández

No.	Pos.	Nation	Player
17	MF	USA	Ashley López
18	DF	MEX	Akane Lara
19	FW	MEX	Karla López
20	MF	GRE	Eva Vlassopoulos
21	MF	MEX	Marine Galaviz
22	DF	MEX	Fátima Delgado
23	DF	USA	Vanessa Penuna
25	DF	MEX	Daniela Meza
26	FW	IRL	Sydney Stephens
27	GK	MEX	Dayana Covarrubias
28	DF	MEX	Bibiana Quintos
29	FW	ESP	Aitana Martínez-Montoya
