= Santos Laguna (women) =

Mexican football club

Santos Laguna Femenil
- Full name: Club Santos Laguna S.A. de C.V. Femenil
- Nickname: Las Guerreras
- Founded: 2016; 10 years ago
- Ground: Estadio Corona; Torreón, Coahuila
- Capacity: 30,000
- Owner: Orlegi Sports
- Chairman: Aleco Irarragorri Kalb
- Manager: Jhonathan Lazcano
- League: Liga Femenil
- Clausura 2026: Regular phase: 16th Final phase: Did not qualify
| Home colours | Away colours |

Club Santos Laguna Femenil is a Mexican women's football club based in Torreón, Coahuila. The club has been the women’s section of Santos Laguna since 2017. The team plays in the Liga Femenil, which started in September 2017.

In April 2021, Santos Laguna forward Linda Frías became the first foreign-born Liga Femenil player to feature for a foreign national team.

== Personnel ==
=== Management ===
| Position | Staff |
|---|---|
| Chairman | (Mexico) Aleco Irarragorri Kalb |
| Sporting director | (Mexico) Hugo Abella |

=== Coaching staff ===
| Position | Staff |
|---|---|
| Manager | (Mexico) Jhonathan Lazcano |
| Assistant manager | (Mexico) Luis Martínez |
| Fitness coach | (Mexico) Héctor Arriaga |
| Team doctor | (Mexico) Zurisadai Rodríguez |
| Team doctor assistant | (Mexico) Benjamín Macías |

== Players ==
=== Current squad ===
As of 31 July 2026

Note: Flags indicate national team as defined under FIFA eligibility rules; some limited exceptions apply. Players may hold more than one non-FIFA nationality.

| No. | Pos. | Nation | Player |
|---|---|---|---|
| 1 | GK | ECU | Kathya Mendoza |
| 2 | DF | ESA | Sarina Villa |
| 3 | DF | USA | Sasha Pickard |
| 4 | DF | TGA | Laveni Vaka |
| 5 | MF | MEX | Yessenia Novella |
| 6 | DF | MEX | Havi Ibarra |
| 7 | MF | ECU | Doménica Rodríguez |
| 8 | FW | UGA | Sandra Nabweteme |
| 9 | FW | MEX | Samantha Calvillo |
| 10 | MF | USA | Karla Rodriguez |
| 11 | DF | MEX | Karen De León |
| 12 | GK | MEX | Maried Rodríguez |

| No. | Pos. | Nation | Player |
|---|---|---|---|
| 13 | MF | MEX | Kimberli Gómez |
| 14 | FW | MEX | Ariatna Dorantes |
| 16 | MF | MEX | Celeste Guevara |
| 19 | FW | MEX | Ahtziri Méndez |
| 20 | MF | MEX | Lia Romero |
| 21 | DF | USA | Fernanda Soto |
| 22 | FW | NGR | Vivian Ikechukwu |
| 23 | GK | MEX | Tabatha Rivas |
| 24 | MF | MEX | Ivonne González (on loan from Guadalajara) |
| 25 | MF | MEX | Nayeli Díaz |
| 26 | MF | USA | Amaya Arias |
| 29 | DF | USA | Gineva López |
