= Cruz Azul (women) =

Mexican professional women's football club

Cruz Azul Femenil
- Full name: Club de Futbol Cruz Azul S.A. de C.V. Femenil
- Nicknames: La Máquina (The Machine); Las Celestes (The Sky Blues); Las Cementeras (The Cement Workers); Las Liebres (The Hares); Los de La Noria (Those from La Noria)
- Founded: 5 December 2016; 9 years ago
- Ground: Estadio Centenario; Cuernavaca, Morelos
- Capacity: 9,670
- Owner: Cooperativa La Cruz Azul
- President: Víctor Velázquez
- Head coach: Joaquín Moreno (interim)
- League: Liga Femenil
- Clausura 2026: Regular phase: 7th Final phase: Quarter-finals
- Website: cfcruzazul.com

Club de Futbol Cruz Azul S.A. de C.V. Femenil, commonly referred to as Cruz Azul Femenil or simply Cruz Azul, is a Mexican professional women's football club based in Cuernavaca, Morelos. The club competes in the Liga Femenil and has been the women's section of the Cruz Azul men's team based in Mexico City since 2016. As of 2026, the club plays its home games at Estadio Centenario in Cuernavaca, Morelos.

== History ==
=== 2016–2017: Foundation and first league tournament ===
Cruz Azul Femenil was founded on 5 December 2016, following the formal creation of the Liga MX Femenil. In its initial years, the team was based in Ciudad Cooperativa Cruz Azul (formerly Jasso, Hidalgo), the location of the parent company and the club's birthplace. The squad played its home games at Estadio 10 de Diciembre, the first major stadium of the men's club. Former Cruz Azul player and youth manager, Eduardo Calderón, was appointed as the first manager of the team in 2017. The club's debut came in the 2017 Copa MX Femenil, a preparation tournament held ahead of the league's inaugural season. The team's first official match was played on 3 May 2017 against Tijuana, resulting in a 2–0 loss. Following the conclusion of the Copa MX Femenil, Calderón was dismissed as manager. Pablo Bocco was subsequently named the new head coach of the team in June 2017.

Cruz Azul's first league match in history was a 2–1 away defeat against Toluca. The team began competing in the league's inaugural season, the Apertura 2017 tournament, where Cruz Azul ended the regular phase of the tournament 14th-place, eventually not qualifying for the playoffs.

=== 2018–2020: Managerial changes and relocation ===
The club underwent significant managerial and structural changes following the inaugural season. After Bocco's departure, former Mexico national football team goalkeeper coach Alberto Aguilar was appointed as manager on 9 November 2017 for the Clausura 2018 tournament, with the team achieving an 11th-place finish. In the Apertura 2018 tournament, Cruz Azul ended at 16th-place, the clubs lowest-ever league finish and a club-record twelve losses in the regular season. On 23 September 2018, the club announced the departure of Aguilar, with Hugo Santana initially taking charge as interim head coach. Santana was subsequently ratified as the permanent manager, overseeing the team for the remainder of the Apertura 2018 and the Clausura 2019 tournament. Santana was succeeded by Rogelio Martínez in June 2019, ahead of the Apertura 2019 tournament. Under Martínez, the team achieved its largest league victory at the time, a 4–0 away win against Veracruz.

In December 2020, following the conclusion of the Guardianes 2020 tournament, Martínez was sacked as manager. Concurrently, the club's management decided to relocate the women's team from Ciudad Cooperativa Cruz Azul to Mexico City, ending the team's three-year tenure at Estadio 10 de Diciembre as its home ground. The club relocated its base of operations and home matches to the training facilities at Instalaciones La Noria.

=== 2021–present: First playoffs qualifications ===
On 22 December 2020, Cruz Azul announced the appointment head coach Roberto Pérez. The club qualified for the liguilla for the first time in the club's history during the Apertura 2021 tournament, after finishing in 8th-place in the regular phase, but the team was eventually eliminated in the quarter-finals of the playoffs by Tigres UANL. A year later, the team secured their second playoff in the Apertura 2022 tournament, where they were again eliminated in the quarter-finals. Following the Apertura 2022, between the Clausura 2023 and Clausura 2025 tournaments, Cruz Azul failed to qualify for the liguilla playoffs for five consecutive seasons.

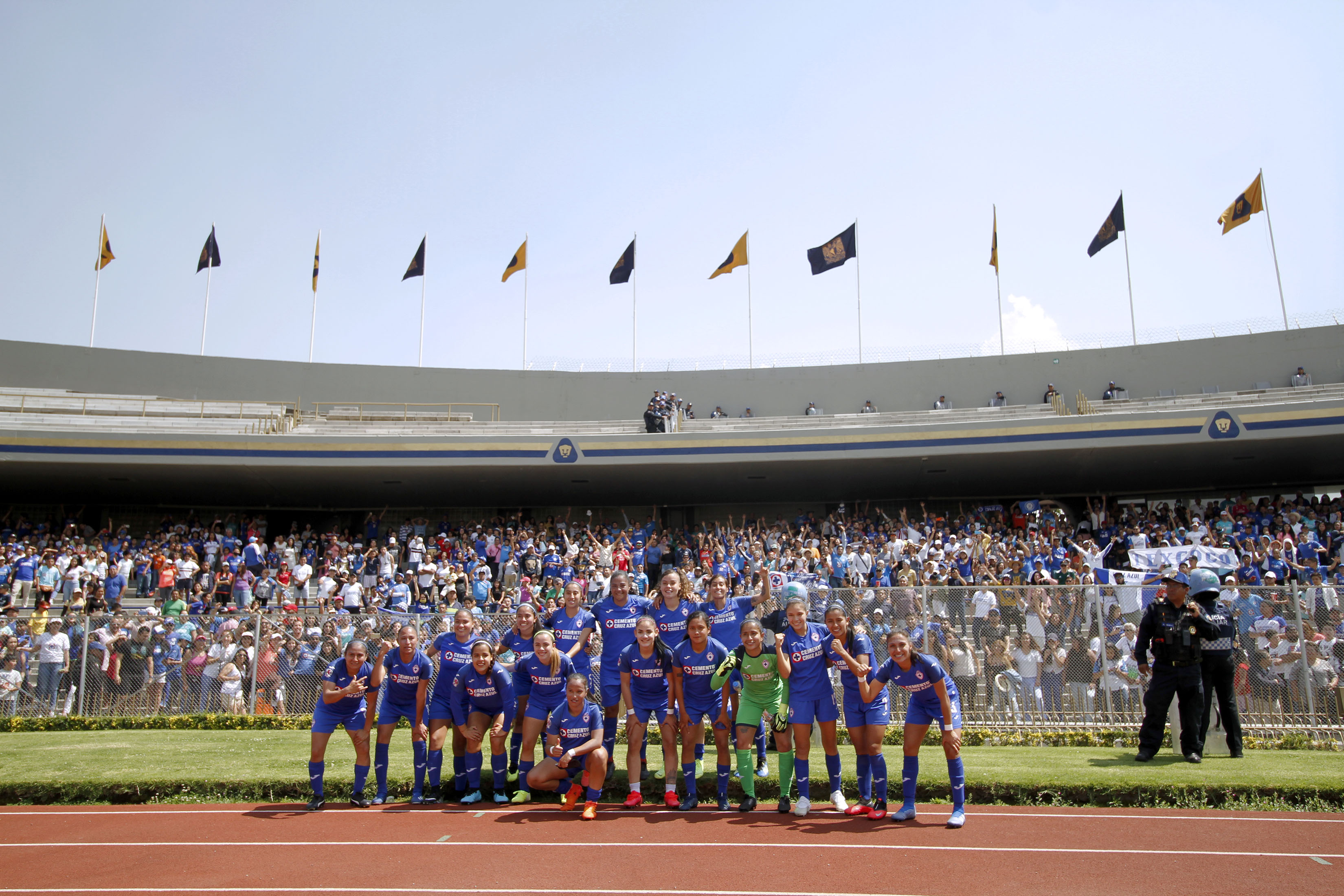
Cruz Azul Femenil team at Estadio Olímpico Universitario against Pumas UNAM in March 2020.

On 18 December 2024, Diego Testas was appointed by the club as new head coach of the team. Testas's first season was the Clausura 2025 tournament, which saw the team finish 10th-place. In the Apertura 2025 tournament, the team finished the regular phase in 7th-place, setting a new club-record for their highest historical league position with 28 points. In the playoffs, Cruz Azul made their first-ever advancement to the semi-finals by eliminating the defending champions, Pachuca, with a 5–0 victory in the second-leg of the quarter-finals. The team's playoff run concluded in the semi-finals, where they were defeated by Tigres UANL with a 3–2 aggregate score (1–1 in the first-leg at Estadio Olímpico Universitario and 2–1 in the return leg at Estadio Universitario in Monterrey, Nuevo León).

On 15 December 2025, the team was relocated to Cuernavaca, Morelos because the team's growth made it necessary for the club to move to a proper stadium.

== Personnel ==
=== Coaching staff ===
Position	Staff
Head coach	(Mexico) Joaquín Moreno (interim)
Assistant coaches	(Mexico) Marco Sánchez Yacuta
Assistant coaches	(Mexico) Lupita Worbis
Fitness coaches	(Mexico) Raúl Maldonado
Fitness coaches	(Mexico) Carlos Martínez
Fitness coaches	(Mexico) Arturo Sánchez
Physiotherapists	(Mexico) Irma Chávez
Physiotherapists	(Mexico) Javier Rivero
Team doctor	(Mexico) Daniel Martínez

Source: Liga Femenil

=== Management ===
Position	Staff
President	(Mexico) Víctor Velázquez
Director of football	(Mexico) Fernanda Pons

Source: Cruz Azul

== Players ==
=== First-team squad ===
As of 31 July 2026

Note: Flags indicate national team as defined under FIFA eligibility rules; some limited exceptions apply. Players may hold more than one non-FIFA nationality.

No.	Pos.	Nation	Player
1	GK	MEX	Melany Villeda
2	DF	MEX	Valeria Miranda
3	DF	USA	Heidi Ruth
4	DF	MEX	Tanna Sánchez
5	MF	MEX	América Frías
6	MF	MEX	Liliana Rodríguez
7	MF	MEX	Lizbeth Ángeles
8	MF	MEX	Alejandra Lomelí
9	FW	GUA	Ana Lucía Martínez
10	MF	ESP	Alicia de la Cuerda
11	DF	USA	Desiree Mendoza
12	GK	MEX	Ofelia Solís
13	FW	MEX	Daniela Calderón

No.	Pos.	Nation	Player
14	DF	PER	Mía León
17	MF	MEX	Cristina Montaño
18	MF	MEX	Belén Cruz
19	MF	MEX	Valeria Valdez (captain)
20	FW	ESA	Brenda Cerén
23	DF	MEX	Ivonne Gutiérrez
24	DF	MEX	Alexa Michel
26	DF	MEX	Araceli Torres (on loan from Guadalajara)
27	MF	MEX	María Esquivel
28	MF	MEX	Ana García
29	FW	NGR	Uchenna Kanu
30	MF	MEX	Joselyn Solís

=== Out on loan ===
Note: Flags indicate national team as defined under FIFA eligibility rules; some limited exceptions apply. Players may hold more than one non-FIFA nationality.

No.	Pos.	Nation	Player
—	DF	MEX	Lia Martínez (at Puebla)
—	MF	MEX	Hanna Osorio (at Puebla)

No.	Pos.	Nation	Player
—	MF	MEX	Diana Salmorán (at Puebla)

== Managers ==
=== Managerial history ===
Name	Period	Notes
(Mexico) Eduardo Calderón	2017	
(Argentina) Pablo Bocco	2017	
(Mexico) Alberto Aguilar	2017–2018	
(Mexico) Hugo Santana	2018–2019	Interim manager, ratified
(Mexico) Rogelio Martínez	2019–2020	
(Mexico) Roberto Pérez	2021–2022	
(Mexico) Nicolás Morales	2023	
(Mexico) Cecilia Cabrera	2023	
(Mexico) José Julio Cevada	2024	
(Uruguay) Diego Testas	2025–2026	
(Mexico) Israel del Real	2026	Interim manager, ratified
(Mexico) Lupita Worbis	2026	Interim manager
(Mexico) Raúl Gutiérrez	2026	
(Mexico) Joaquín Moreno	2026–	Interim manager
