= Pumas UNAM (women) =

Mexican football club

UNAM Femenil
- Full name: Club Universidad Nacional, A. C. Femenil
- Nickname: Pumas
- Founded: 2016; 10 years ago
- Ground: Estadio Olímpico Universitario; Coyoacán, Mexico City
- Capacity: 72,000
- Owner: National Autonomous University of Mexico (UNAM)
- Chairman: Luis Raúl González
- Manager: Roberto Medina
- League: Liga Femenil
- Clausura 2026: Regular phase: 10th Final phase: Did not qualify
- Website: https://pumas.mx/
Home colours	Away colours	Third colours

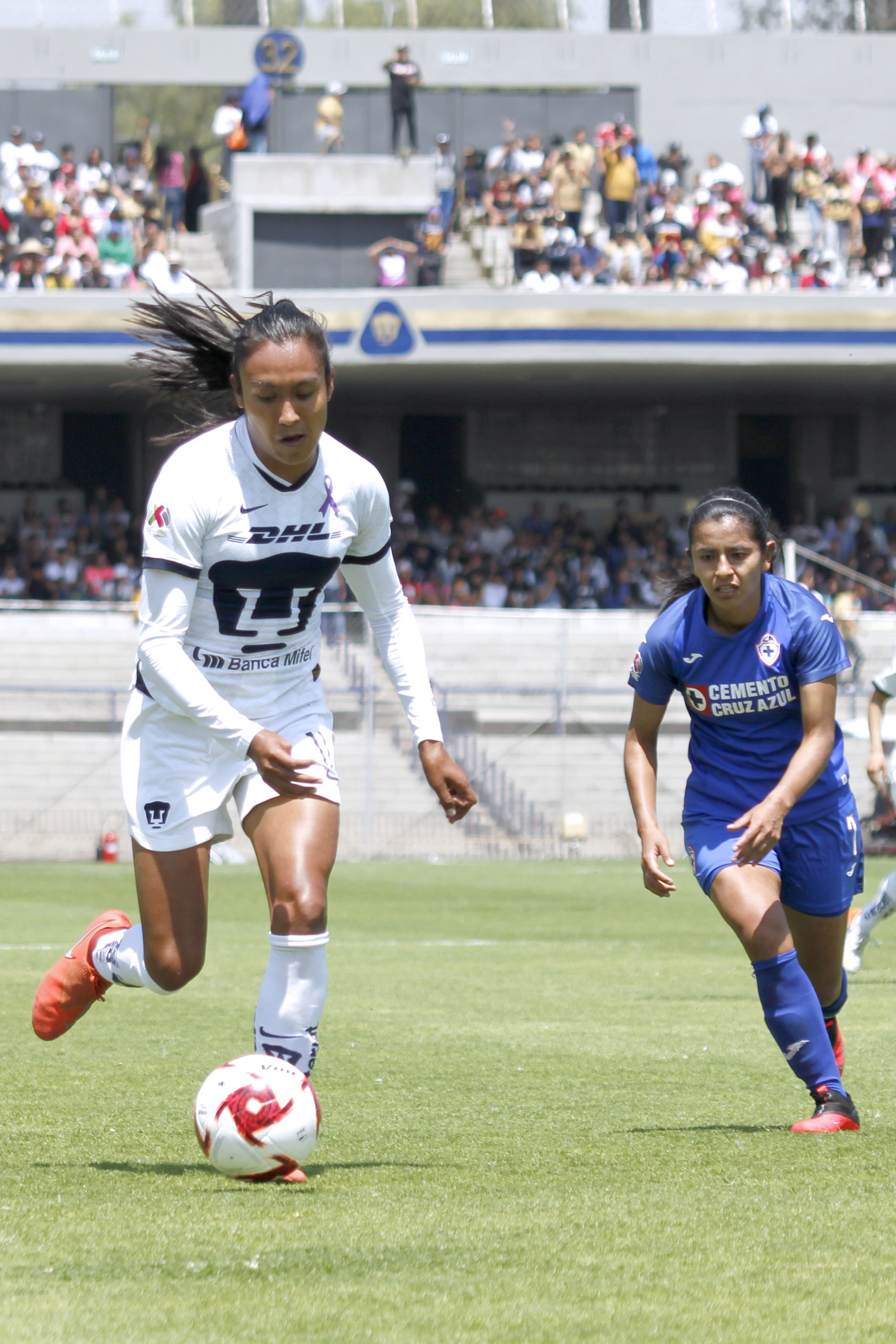
Cruz Azul playing at Universidad Nacional on 14 March 2020.

Club Universidad Nacional Femenil, commonly known as UNAM or their nickname Pumas Femenil, is a Mexican professional women's football club based in Mexico City that competes in the Liga Femenil. The club has been the women's section of Pumas since 2016.

== Personnel ==
=== Club administration ===
Position	Staff
Chairman	(Mexico) Luis Raúl González
Sporting director	(Mexico) Leonardo Cuéllar

Source: Club Universidad Nacional

=== Coaching staff ===
Position	Staff
Manager	(Mexico) Roberto Medina
Assistant managers	(Mexico) Marco Zamora (Mexico) Gabriel Solorio
Fitness coach	(Mexico) Diego Fernández
Team doctor	(Mexico) Claudia Pérez
Team doctor assistant	(Mexico) Karla Cortez

Source: Liga MX Femenil

== Players ==
=== Current squad ===
As of 31 July 2026

Note: Flags indicate national team as defined under FIFA eligibility rules; some limited exceptions apply. Players may hold more than one non-FIFA nationality.

No.	Pos.	Nation	Player
1	GK	MEX	Wendy Toledo
2	DF	MEX	Karen Ramírez
3	DF	MEX	Ana Mendoza
4	DF	MEX	Elena Sainz
5	DF	MEX	Ximena Ríos
7	FW	POR	Stephanie Ribeiro
8	DF	ESP	Andrea Pereira
9	MF	CRC	Priscila Chinchilla
10	MF	PUR	Cristina Torres
11	MF	MEX	Montserrat Hernández

No.	Pos.	Nation	Player
12	FW	USA	Angelina Hix
13	MF	MEX	Paola Chavero
14	DF	MEX	Julissa Dávila
15	FW	AUS	Emily Gielnik
16	MF	MEX	Alejandra Guerrero
17	DF	GHA	Portia Boakye
20	GK	MEX	Jashia López
25	GK	MEX	Mar Moya
26	MF	MEX	Alexa Huerta
31	MF	MEX	Casandra Montero
