= Liga Femenil =

Highest division of league competition for Mexican women's football

- Logo used since 2026
- Organising body: Mexican Football Federation
- Founded: 5 December 2016; 9 years ago
- Country: Mexico
- Confederation: CONCACAF
- Number of clubs: 18
- Level on pyramid: 1
- Domestic cup: Campeón de Campeonas
- International cup: CONCACAF W Champions Cup
- Current champions: América (3rd title)
- Most championships: Tigres UANL (7 titles)
- Most appearances: Liliana Mercado (290) (as of the end of the Apertura 2025)
- Top scorer: Charlyn Corral (166) (as of the end of the Apertura 2025)
- Broadcasters: ESPN (Note: includes ESPN 2, ESPN 3, ESPN 4, and Disney+.); Fox (Note: FOX Corporation Liga MX Femenil matches in the Mexico market are produced by MEDIAPRO Mexico and airs on new pay TV channel Canal FOX as well as via the premium pay TV app FOX (formerly Caliente TV), and via the FOX en Tubi and FOX en Tubi Xtra Free Advertising Supported Television (FAST) channels on the free TV app Tubi); Televisa (Note: Includes Canal 5, Nueve, Las Estrellas, Sky Sports, Vix, TUDN and Izzi Telecom.); TV Azteca (Note: includes Azteca Digital)
- Website: www.ligafemenil.mx
- Current: 2026–27 Liga Femenil season

Liga Femenil, formally known as Liga MX Femenil, and officially named as Liga BBVA Femenil for sponsorship reasons, is a professional association football league and the highest level of women's football in Mexico. Supervised by the Federación Mexicana de Fútbol, it has 18 participating teams, each coinciding with a Liga MX club.

Following a similar schedule as Liga MX, each season consist of two tournaments: an Apertura tournament, which takes place from July to December, and a Clausura tournament, which takes place from January to May.

Tigres UANL is the most successful team with seven titles, followed by Monterrey with four, América with three, Guadalajara with two, and Pachuca with one. In all, only these five clubs have won the Liga MX Femenil at least once.

The current champions are Club América who defeated Monterrey with a 3–1 aggregate score in the Clausura 2026 final in May 2026.

== History ==
=== Background ===
Previous to the establishment of Liga MX Femenil, there were attempts by the Mexican Football Federation, Liga MX clubs, and women's football advocates to professionalize women's football in Mexico, but none of these attempts were successful.

==== Liga Mexicana de Fútbol Femenil ====
In 2007, there was an attempt to professionalize women's football in Mexico via the Liga Mexicana de Fútbol Femenil. While the league did foster some success, it did not have major sponsorships and lacked media coverage as well as fan support. Therefore, major clubs participating in the league such as Chivas, pulled their support.

==== NWSL ====
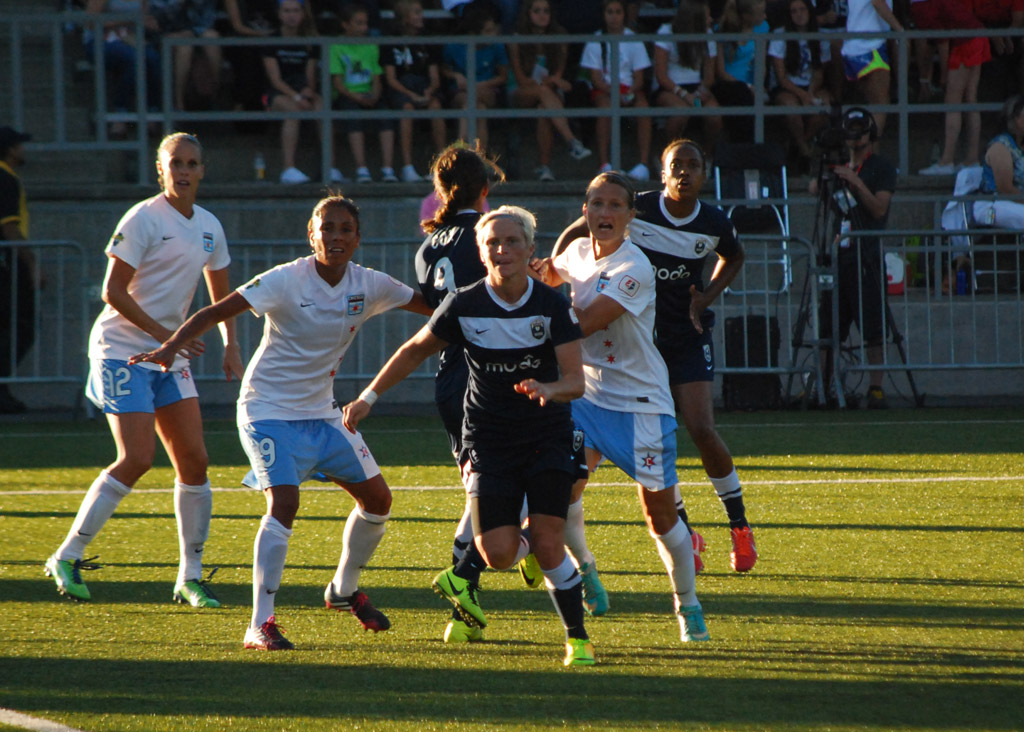
Maribel Domínguez (second from left) playing for the Chicago Red Stars during the inaugural season of the NWSL.

In November 2012, the United States Soccer Federation announced the establishment of the National Women's Soccer League (NWSL) in a push to professionalize women's soccer in the United States. In an arrangement with the U.S. Soccer Federation to develop Mexican talent in the United States, the Mexican Football Federation pledged to allocate Mexican players to NWSL clubs while also covering the salaries of such players. Well-known Mexican players such as Maribel Domínguez and Mónica Ocampo were among the first players to be allocated to the NWSL as part of this arrangement, which was in effect from 2013 until early 2016, when the Mexican Football Federation announced that it would no longer continue allocating players to the NWSL, citing the limited playing time these players were receiving as the reason for pulling out from the agreement with the NWSL, foreshadowing the creation of Liga MX Femenil.

==== First professional women's team ====
The late Marbella Ibarra was an enthusiastic women's football advocate who persuaded Club Tijuana to create a professional women's team in 2014. Former Mexico women's national football team player Andrea Rodebaugh took the helm as manager during the program's stint in the Women's Premier Soccer League.

=== A new Mexican league ===
==== Announcement and preparation ====
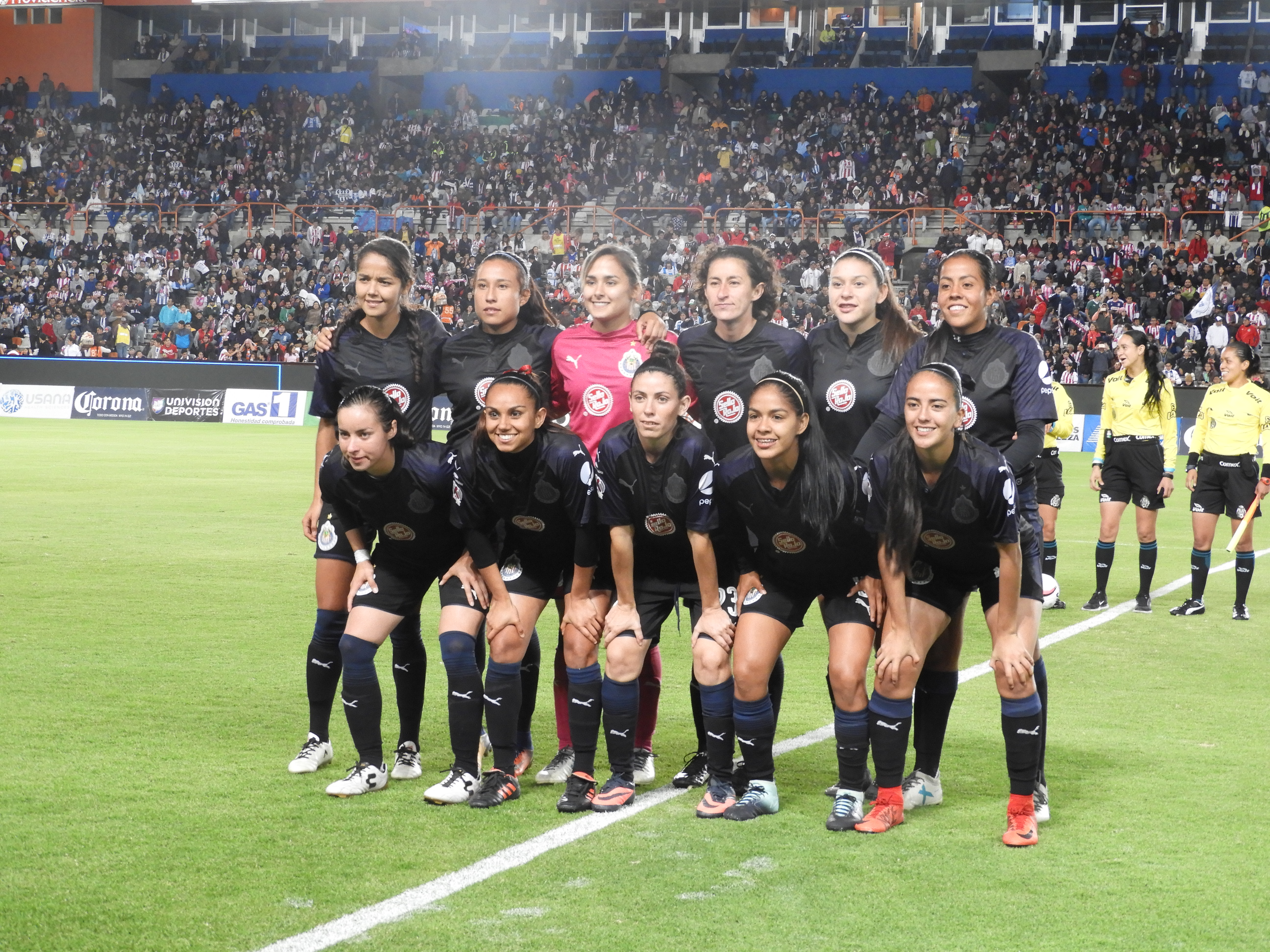
The Chivas Femenil starting lineup that played the first leg of the Apertura 2017 final against Pachuca.

On 5 December 2016, during a general assembly meeting with all Liga MX club owners, former Liga MX President, Enrique Bonilla, announced the formation of the new Liga MX Femenil in an effort to grow and build talent within Mexico. The announcement stated that 16 out of the 18 Liga MX clubs (excluding Puebla and Chiapas due to financial problems) would field U-23 rosters with four U-17 players and up to two overage players.

Before the inaugural season, the teams participated in a warm-up tournament called Copa MX Femenil. The tournament took place between 3 and 6 May 2017, with only 12 of the 16 teams participating due to four clubs not having a team ready by the time of the tournament's inauguration. Pachuca won this tournament by winning the final 9–1 against Club Tijuana.

==== First tournament ====
The first Apertura 2017 matches were played on 28 July 2017. Chivas won the first Liga MX Femenil championship on 24 November 2017 by defeating Pachuca in the final. The two matches drew record-setting crowds of 28,955 and 32,466 spectators, respectively.

Commentator Glenn Moore declared Liga MX Femenil to have concluded a "very successful debut campaign."

=== Regulations ===
During the inaugural season, teams were expected to field U-23 rosters; four slots were reserved for U-17 players, while two were for overage players. All players had to be born in Mexico. Additionally, the sixteen teams were split into two groups. Teams in each group played each other twice per season. The top two teams from each group advanced to the liguilla (playoffs), which consisted of a semi-final of two matches (home and away) followed by a final, also of two matches.

League rules mostly stayed the same for the second season. However, the U-23 limit was raised to U-24. liguilla spots were also expanded to include eight teams instead of four, with the top four teams from each group moving on to the liguilla.

For the third season, the age limit was raised to 25, but each team was allowed to field up to 6 overage players at a time. In addition, the groups were undone, so each team would play each other at least once during the season. Foreign-born Mexican players were also allowed to play, with up to six allowed per team. This decision brought in more players to the league from the NCAA, as well as from the NWSL and Spain's Primera División.

For the fourth season, the overage limit was removed, nonetheless the teams are still being required to allocate a certain amount of minutes of playing time per tournament to U-20 players to satisfy the league's minors rule. The Campeón de Campeonas championship was also introduced to the league for the first time, with Tigres winning the first edition automatically after winning the league title of both tournaments of the 2021–22 season.

For the fifth season, the league began to allow teams to have two non-Mexican players on their rosters. On 25 June 2021, Tigres became the first club to make use of this option by signing Brazilian player Stefany Ferrer. The league also inaugurated its youth division; Club América won the initial tournament.

Beginning with the sixth season, the league began implementing VAR in the Liguilla phase of the tournament. Non-Mexican players spots also increased from two to four per team.

During the eighth season, the league introduced an additional spot for non-Mexican players, thus allowing each team to have up to five non-Mexican players in their squad. The league also made changes to the minors rule to no longer take into account U-20 players’ playing time with their youth national teams (U-20 and U-17) unless the players received substantial playing time during a given tournament (90 minutes for U-17 players and 180 for U-20 players).

The league approved more regulatory changes for the ninth season, including the addition of two more non-Mexican player slots, allowing each team to have up to seven non-Mexican players in their rosters. To compensate for the additional non-Mexican player slots, the league made changes to the minor rule by expanding the required number of minutes of playing time for U-20 Mexican players from 1,000 to 1,260.

=== Notable results ===
The league set history during the Clausura 2018 tournament as the second match of the final between Monterrey and Tigres at Estadio BBVA was at the time the highest-attended club match in women's football history, with a total of 51,211 fans attending the game. This record has been broken multiple times since then, but Mexico still holds the record for the highest attendance on a women's football match, which took place during the 1971 Women's World Cup final at Estadio Azteca.

On 5 October 2019, a Liga MX Femenil team obtained for the first time a victory against an NWSL team when Tigres defeated Houston Dash 2–1 at the Estadio Universitario. Previously, the Houston Dash had faced Monterrey in 2018 in a preseason match that ended with a 3–1 victory in favor of the Dash; This match represented the first time that a Liga MX Femenil team faced an NWSL side.

On 5 July 2022, a Liga MX Femenil team and a European team faced each other for the first time when Club América played against Frauen-Bundesliga team Bayer 04 Leverkusen at Estadio Azteca. The match ended in a 1–0 victory for América.

In November 2022, the league's previous highest attendance record set during the Clausura 2018 final between Monterrey and Tigres (51,211 attendees) was broken as the first match of the Apertura 2022 final between Tigres and Club América at Estadio Azteca drew a crowd of approximately 52,654 fans. This final also broke TV viewership records as it was viewed by more than 5.3 million people, therefore becoming the most-viewed Liga MX Femenil final. As a whole, the tournament was until that point the most viewed tournament in Liga MX Femenil history.

During the Clausura 2023 tournament, Club América accepted to transfer Mexican forward Scarlett Camberos to Angel City FC in the fifth most expensive transfer in women's football of 2023, therefore becoming the largest transfer in league history until that point for an outgoing player, larger than the transfers of Nigerian forward Uchenna Kanu to Racing Louisville for a $150,000 fee plus incentives, and Mia Fishel to Chelsea for a reported $250,000 fee, both by Tigres and in 2023 as well. Additionally, the previous attendance record of the league that was set during the Apertura 2022 final was broken once again during the Clausura 2023 tournament final, as approximately 58,156 fans attended the second leg of this final at Estadio Azteca to watch win its second title in history. The Clausura 2023 tournament also became the most viewed tournament in league history as more than 15 million people tuned in to watch throughout the tournament.

During the Apertura 2023 tournament, the transfer of Miah Zuazua from FC Juárez to Club América was the first transaction between two Liga MX Femenil clubs in which a transfer fee was paid.

In 2024, the league in collaboration with the NWSL staged the Summer Cup. This competition featured all 14 teams from the NWSL and the six Liga MX Femenil teams that accumulated the most number of points across the Clausura and Apertura tournaments during 2023.

The league largest transfer in history for an incoming player came on 12 September 2024, when América reached an agreement with SC Internacional to transfer 20-years old Brazilian international forward Priscila to its ranks in exchange of a $497,403 fee plus incentives, making this transaction the largest one between Latin-American women's football clubs, and one of the largest in women's football at the time.

On 21 August 2025, Tigres reached an agreement to transfer Mexican forward Lizbeth Ovalle to NWSL club Orlando Pride for a world-record transfer fee in women's football, reportedly of around US$1.5 million, therefore breaking the previous record that was set with the transfer of Olivia Smith from Liverpool to Arsenal just a month prior.

On 22 August 2025, the league celebrated their first All-Star game by facing FC Barcelona in Monterrey. The match was won by Barcelona on penalties after a 2–2 draw.

On 24 May 2026, the league achieved a major milestone in their internationalization efforts with Club América becoming the first Mexican women's football club to win a continental trophy when América defeated National Women's Soccer League side Washington Spirit at the 2025–26 CONCACAF W Champions Cup final. With this victory, América also secured an spot for the 2027 FIFA Women's Champions Cup and the 2028 FIFA Women's Club World Cup.

=== Club changes ===
For the inaugural season, only 16 of the 18 Liga MX clubs had a Liga MX Femenil team as Chiapas and Puebla were allowed to not have a team due to financial problems. However, by the second season, all 18 clubs had an active Liga MX Femenil side. By then, Chiapas had been relegated to Ascenso MX, while Lobos BUAP had been promoted to Liga MX. As such, Lobos BUAP and Puebla both introduced their Liga MX Femenil sides during the 2018–2019 season.

By the third season, the league was expanded to 19 teams as Atlético San Luis Femenil was introduced due to Atlético San Luis promotion to Liga MX while no team was relegated. Additionally, the Lobos BUAP franchise was acquired by then-second division club FC Juárez, as such the Lobos BUAP femenil team moved from Puebla to Juárez to form FC Juárez Femenil. After the Apertura 2019, Veracruz folded in Liga MX, as such Veracruz Femenil became a defunct club as well, bringing the league back down to 18 teams. In June 2020, amidst the COVID-19 pandemic, the Monarcas Morelia franchised was relocated to Mazatlán, putting an end to Morelia Femenil's three-years old trajectory in the top flight, and creating and integrating Mazatlán F.C. as the newest member of the league.

On 9 December 2025, Mexican Football Federation president, Mikel Arriola, confirmed that Atlante F.C. and Mazatlan had entered into an agreement in which Atlante would be acquiring Mazatlan's Liga MX franchise rights through, with the deal expected to closed in the first half of 2026. On 23 April 2026, Atlante announced that the deal had closed, therefore officializing the desintegration of the entire Mazatlán organization and allowing Atlantle to join Liga MX beginning with the 2026–27 season. As per Liga MX regulations, Atlante Femenil made its debut in Liga Femenil during the 2026–27 season.

=== Sponsorships ===
Prior to the third season, BBVA México announced that it would sponsor Liga MX Femenil in addition to Liga MX and Ascenso MX. With the sponsorship, which is slated for at least three years, the league's name was changed to Liga BBVA MX Femenil in June 2019. Each club also have their own sponsors.

On 29 March 2023, Liga MX Femenil announced that Nike would become an official sponsor of the league. Unlike other sponsorships the league has, this one is exclusively for Liga MX Femenil. With this sponsorship, the official match ball of the league will be provided by Nike. Nike will also be providing equípment to all league players including players of the league's youth division, product innovation, and investment in development programs. The sponsorship went into full effect beginning with the 2023–24 season and is set to last for three years.

=== Lower and youth divisions ===
==== Lower divisions ====
In addition to the Liga Mexicana de Fútbol Femenil, Mexico is also home to the Liga Mayor Femenil. Many players in Liga MX Femenil previously played in either of these existing leagues, as well as in various Mexican or US college teams and the WPSL.

On 25 September 2024, Liga TDP Femenil was announced to the public with the support of the Mexican Football Federation, Liga TDP, and Liga Premier clubs with the goal of developing players that can be integrated into Liga MX Femenil clubs. Although the league is not professional, it is considered to be by the Mexican Football Federation as the third division of women's football in Mexico. The league first season officially began on 8 October 2024.

==== Youth division ====
Since 2022, Liga Femenil has had a youth division to develop talent in which all clubs are required to participate. This division began as a U-17 division, but it gradually incremented the allowed age of the players that could participate in it after each season until it became a U-19 division during 2023–24 season. There are future plans for the league to expand this division by including unique categories for ages 15–20.

=== Rebranding ===
On 23 July 2026, the league announced that it was rebranding itself as "Liga Femenil" as part of the league objective of separating itself from Liga MX. A new competition format different from the format used in Liga MX was also announced. This new format, which reduces the number of games played during the regular phase of each tournament to 14 (three games less compared to the previous format), is expected to assist clubs in reducing operating costs, help reduced player injuries, and allow teams to have a better weekly preparation.

== Competition format ==
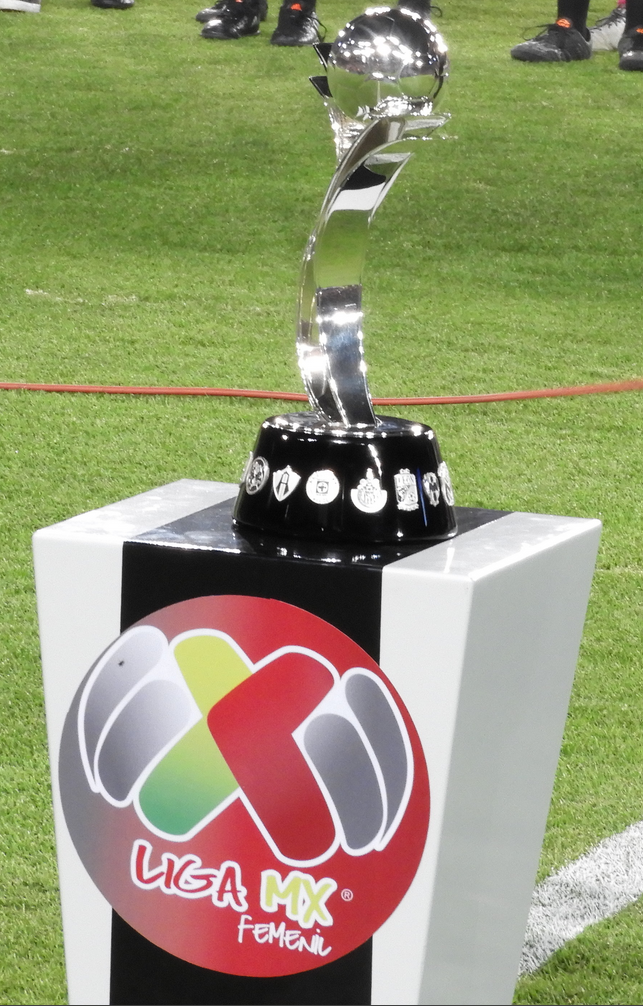
Liga Femenil trophy.

Each Liga Femenil season is divided into two tournaments: an Apertura (opening) tournament, which usually takes place from July to December, and a Clausura (closing) tournament, which usually takes place from January to May, with each tournament crowning a champion. Each tournament consist of a regular phase, and a Liguilla (Liga MX Femenil version of the playoffs) phase. The league does not have a promotion and relegation system.

Depending on their performance during the season, teams can qualify to the annual CONCACAF W Champions Cup.

=== Regular phase ===
For the inaugural 2017–18 season, the regular phase competition format consisted of 16 teams divided into two groups of eight from which the top two teams from each group at the end of the regular phase qualified to the semi-finals of the Liguilla. For the 2018–19 season, the regular phase format was changed along with the addition of two more teams to the league. With the new format, 18 teams were divided into two groups of nine, from which the top four teams from each group at the end of the regular phase of the tournament qualified to the quarter-finals of the Liguilla. For the 2019–20 season, the format was changed once more to introduce a single table of 18 teams, in which each team played against the other 17 teams. After 17 matchdays, The top eight teams advanced to the quarter-finals of the liguilla.

For the 2026–27 season, the competition format was changed once more to introduced the current format, with the league bringing back the group format previously used during the 2018–19 season, although with new additions. With this format, 18 teams are divided into two groups of nine based on each team's performance during regular phase of previous seasons and geographic location – The groups are the same for both Apertura and Clausura tournament. Each group is further divided into three blocks (block 1, 2, and 3), with each block consisting of three teams. Each team plays a single match against each of the other eights teams in its group, and an additional six matches against teams from the opposite group for a total of 14 matches. The six inter-group matches are drawn from the three blocks of each group (two matches per block). Furthermore, the three teams from each block that did not played against a specific team from the opposite group, will play an inter-group match against that team during the Clausura tournament, with this each team in the league will face against each other at least once during the full season. With this format, the top four teams of each group qualify to the final phase.

=== Final phase (liguilla) ===
The liguilla (Spanish for play-off) is the final phase of the tournament. This phase begins with the quarter-finals, for which the top four teams from each group at the end of the regular phase qualify. Each knockout stage of the Liguilla is play as a two-game series (home-and-away basis), in which the team that finished higher in their group during the regular phase always plays the second match at home. In case of a draw in the aggregate score of a series after 180 minutes in the quarter-finals or semi-finals stages, the team that finished higher in their respective groups during the regular phase of the tournament advances to the next stage. In case of draw in the aggregate score of the final after 180 minutes, the teams go directly to penalties to decide the champion.

=== CONCACAF W Champions Cup qualification ===
On 12 March 2024, CONCACAF announced the CONCACAF W Champions Cup, its annual continental women's football club competition. Liga MX Femenil is allocated three spots into the group stage of the competition. Teams qualify to this tournament based on the following criteria:

- Champion of the Apertura tournament
- Champion of the Clausura tournament
- Best runner-up of the season based on total accumulated points across the regular phase of both Apertura and Clausura tournaments

== Participating clubs ==
Due to Liga MX regulations, every club that wants to participate in the men's first division must field a respective women's side in Liga Femenil. Temporary exceptions to this rule were granted in the initial years of the league to financially unstable clubs, nevertheless, as of the 2026–27 season every Liga MX side has a respective women's side.

The 2026–27 Liga Femenil season will have the following 18 participating teams:

Location of the 2026–27 Liga Femenil teams.
Location of the 2026–27 Liga Femenil teams in Greater Mexico City.

Club	City	Ground	Capacity	First season in Liga Femenil	Ref
América (Note: Club América play some of its home games during the regular phase at an alternative venue located at their training grounds.)	Mexico City	Estadio Azteca	87,523	2017–18	
Atlante	Mexico City	CAR Atlante field 1	TBD	2026–27	
Atlas	Guadalajara	Jalisco	55,020	2017–18	
Atlético San Luis	San Luis Potosí City	Libertad Financiera	25,709	2019–20	
Cruz Azul	Cuernavaca	Centenario	9,670	2017–18	
Guadalajara	Zapopan	Akron	46,232	2017–18	
Juárez	Ciudad Juárez	Olímpico Benito Juárez	19,703	2019–20	
León	León	León	31,297	2017–18	
Monterrey	Guadalupe	BBVA	51,348	2017–18	
Necaxa	Aguascalientes City	Victoria	23,851	2017–18	
Pachuca	Pachuca	Hidalgo	27,512	2017–18	
Puebla	Puebla City	Cuauhtémoc	47,417	2018–19	
Querétaro	Querétaro City	Corregidora	34,130	2017–18	
Santos Laguna	Torreón	Corona	29,237	2017–18	
Tijuana	Tijuana	Caliente	27,333	2017–18	
Toluca	Toluca	Nemesio Díez	31,000	2017–18	
Tigres UANL	San Nicolás de los Garza	Universitario	41,886	2017–18	
Pumas UNAM	Mexico City	Olímpico Universitario	48,297	2017–18	

== Managers ==
The current managers in Liga Femenil are:

Nat.	Name	Club	Appointed	Time as manager
(Spain)	Ángel Villacampa	América	17 June 2022	4 years, 157 days
(Mexico)	Alejandro Corona	León	6 December 2022	3 years, 350 days
(Spain)	Óscar Fernández	Juárez	13 June 2023	3 years, 161 days
(Spain)	Antonio Contreras	Guadalajara	28 November 2024	1 year, 358 days
(Mexico)	Ignacio Quintana	Atlético San Luis	13 December 2024	1 year, 343 days
(Spain)	Pedro Martínez Losa	Tigres UANL	20 December 2024	1 year, 336 days
(Mexico)	Jhonathan Lazcano	Santos Laguna	21 March 2025	1 year, 245 days
(France)	Amandine Miquel	Monterrey	1 December 2025	355 days
(Mexico)	Roberto Medina	Pumas UNAM	2 December 2025	354 days
(Mexico)	Juan Pablo Alfaro	Atlas	2 December 2025	354 days
(Mexico)	Fernando Samayoa	Tijuana	11 December 2025	345 days
(Italy)	Pamela Conti	Querétaro	2 June 2026	172 days
(Mexico)	José Carlos Durón	Puebla	9 June 2026	165 days
(Mexico)	Ileana Dávila	Atlante	23 September 2026	59 days
(Spain)	Montse Tomé	Pachuca	25 September 2026	57 days
(Mexico)	Édgar Dueñas	Toluca	10 October 2026	42 days
(Mexico)	Joaquín Moreno (interim)	Cruz Azul	17 October 2026	35 days
	Vacant	Necaxa		0 days

Source: Liga MX Femenil

== Results ==
Finals
Ed.	Season	Champions	Results	Runners-up
1	Apertura 2017	Guadalajara	0–2; 3–0	Pachuca
2	Clausura 2018	Tigres UANL	2–2; 2–2 (4–2 p)	Monterrey
3	Apertura 2018	América	2–2; 1–1 (3–1 p)	Tigres UANL
4	Clausura 2019	Tigres UANL	1–1; 2–1	Monterrey
5	Apertura 2019	Monterrey	1–1; 1–0	Tigres UANL
–	Clausura 2020	The season was canceled (Note: On 22 May 2020, Liga MX informed that the Clausura tournament in Liga MX and Liga MX Femenil was canceled due to the COVID-19 pandemic, with no title being awarded.)		
6	Guardianes 2020	Tigres UANL	1–0; 0–1 (3–2 p)	Monterrey
7	Guardianes 2021	Tigres UANL	2–1; 5–3	Guadalajara
8	Apertura 2021	Monterrey	2–2; 0–0 (3–1 p)	Tigres UANL
9	Clausura 2022	Guadalajara	4–2; 0–1	Pachuca
10	Apertura 2022	Tigres UANL	1–0; 2–0	América
11	Clausura 2023	América	2–1; 2–1	Pachuca
12	Apertura 2023	Tigres UANL	3–0; 0–0	América
13	Clausura 2024	Monterrey	0–1; 2–1 (4–3 p)	América
14	Apertura 2024	Monterrey	0–1; 3–2 (4–3 p)	Tigres UANL
15	Clausura 2025	Pachuca	3–0; 0–2	América
16	Apertura 2025	Tigres UANL	3–3; 1–0	América
17	Clausura 2026	América	0–1; 3–0	Monterrey

== Performances ==
Performance by club
Club	Titles	Runners-up	Winning editions
Tigres UANL	7	4	Clausura 2018, Clausura 2019, Guardianes 2020, Guardianes 2021, Apertura 2022, Apertura 2023, Apertura 2025
Monterrey	4	4	Apertura 2019, Apertura 2021, Clausura 2024, Apertura 2024
América	3	5	Apertura 2018, Clausura 2023, Clausura 2026
Guadalajara	2	1	Apertura 2017, Clausura 2022
Pachuca	1	3	Clausura 2025

== Player records ==
=== Top scorers by tournament ===
Tournament	Player	Club	Goals
Apertura 2017	(Mexico) Lucero Cuevas	América	15
Clausura 2018	(Mexico) Lucero Cuevas (2)	América	15
Apertura 2018	(Mexico) Desirée Monsiváis	Monterrey	13
Clausura 2019	(Mexico) Fabiola Ibarra	Atlas	7
Clausura 2019	(Mexico) Isela Ojeda	Santos Laguna	7
Apertura 2019	(Mexico) Desirée Monsiváis (2)	Monterrey	17
Apertura 2019	(Mexico) Viridiana Salazar	Pachuca	17
Guardianes 2020	(Mexico) Katty Martínez	Tigres UANL	18
Guardianes 2021	(Mexico) Alison González	Atlas	18
Grita México 2021	(Mexico) Alicia Cervantes	Guadalajara	17
Clausura 2022	(Mexico) Alicia Cervantes (2)	Guadalajara	14
Apertura 2022	(United States) Mia Fishel	Tigres UANL	17
Clausura 2023	(Mexico) Charlyn Corral	Pachuca	20
Apertura 2023	(Mexico) Alicia Cervantes (3)	Guadalajara	15
Apertura 2023	(Mexico) Maricarmen Reyes	Tigres UANL	15
Clausura 2024	(Mexico) Charlyn Corral (2)	Pachuca	19
Apertura 2024	(Mexico) Charlyn Corral (3)	Pachuca	18
Clausura 2025	(Mexico) Charlyn Corral (4)	Pachuca	21
Apertura 2025	(Mexico) Charlyn Corral (5)	Pachuca	22
Clausura 2026	(France) Eugénie Le Sommer	Toluca	18
Clausura 2026	(Mexico) Diana Ordóñez	Tigres UANL	18
Apertura 2026	(Brazil) Geyse	América	21

=== Most appearances ===
Pos	Player	Regular phase appearances	Liguilla appearances	Total appearances	Years	Teams(s)
1	(Mexico) Liliana Mercado	223	67	290	2017–present	FC Juarez (34), Tigres UANL (256)
2	(Mexico) Nancy Antonio	213	71	284	2017–present	Club América (43), Tigres UANL (241)
3	(Mexico) Lizbeth Ovalle	205	72	277	2017–2025	Tigres UANL (277)
4	(Mexico) Rebeca Bernal	212	62	274	2017–2025	C.F. Monterrey (274)
5	(Mexico) Lizbeth Ángeles	238	34	272	2017–present	Cruz Azul (17), Club León (47), C.F. Pachuca (208)
6	(Mexico) Diana García	221	48	269	2017–present	C.F. Monterrey (194), Club León (59), C.F. Pachuca (16)
7	(Mexico) Casandra Cuevas	228	40	268	2017–present	Toluca (13), Club América (237), Club Tijuana (18)
8	(Mexico) Katty Martinez	196	70	266	2017–present	C.F. Monterrey (34), Club América (99), Tigres UANL (133)
9	(Mexico) Karla Nieto	220	45	265	2017–present	C.F. Pachuca (265)
10	(Mexico) Cristina Ferral	198	66	264	2018–2026	Tigres UANL (264)

=== Most goals ===
Pos	Player	Regular phase goals	Liguilla goals	Total goals	Years	Team(s)
1	(Mexico) Charlyn Corral	159	15	176	2021–present	C.F. Pachuca (176)
2	(Mexico) Alicia Cervantes	140	22	162	2017–present	C.D. Guadalajara (141), C.F. Monterrey (12), Atlas (9)
3	(Mexico) Katty Martinez	129	24	153	2017–present	C.F. Monterrey (5), Club América (53), Tigres UANL (95)
4	(Mexico) Desirée Monsiváis	117	17	134	2017–2024	FC Juarez (1), Pumas UNAM (11), C.F. Monterrey (122)
5	(Mexico) Lizbeth Ovalle	101	30	131	2017–2025	Tigres UANL (131)
6	(Mexico) Alison González	101	16	117	2018–present	Tigres UANL (18), Club América (27), Atlas (72)
7	(Mexico) Daniela Espinosa	103	10	113	2017–present	Club América (84), Club Tijuana (29)
8	(Mexico) Stephany Mayor	86	22	108	2020–present	Tigres UANL (108)
9	(Mexico) Christina Burkenroad	85	16	101	2020–present	C.F. Monterrey (101)
10	(Mexico) Viridiana Salazar	84	13	97	2017–present	C.D. Guadalajara (10), C.F. Pachuca (87)

== Broadcasting ==
Each club in the league negotiates their own TV rights contracts with TV networks or streaming platforms. Most clubs have at least one official broadcaster in Mexico, and a number of them also offer their games in the U.S. either through TV broadcast or streaming.

Beginning with the Clausura 2025 tournament, Liga MX Femenil began to produce the TV broadcast of the home games of América, Cruz Azul, Monterrey, Necaxa, Pumas, and Toluca as well as streaming these games through YouTube, Facebook, and TikTok as part of a new initiative called "FutFem Donde Sea (women’s football everywhere)", with the goal of reaching a wider audience and centralizing the TV rights of the league. The league streaming does not affect the broadcasts of the TV network or streaming platform that holds the TV rights of a team; The league broadcast can even be used or leverage by such partners if they wish to do so. The expectation is that the remaining teams will join this initiative at a later date.

Broadcast rights
Team	Mexico Broadcaster	U.S. Broadcaster	Global Broadcaster (Including Mexico & United States)
América	Televisa	TelevisaUnivision	Liga Femenil
Atlas	Fox	–	–
Atlético San Luis	ESPN	–	Liga Femenil
Atlante	–	–	Liga Femenil
Cruz Azul	Televisa	TelevisaUnivision	Liga Femenil
Guadalajara	Fox / Prime Video / Chivas TV	NBCUniversal / Fox Deportes	–
Juárez	Fox	Fox Deportes/ Estrella TV / NBCUniversal	–
León	Fox/ TV4	–	–
Monterrey	Televisa	TelevisaUnivision	Liga Femenil
Necaxa	Fox	–	–
Pachuca	Fox	–	–
Puebla	–	–	Liga Femenil
Querétaro	Fox	TelevisaUnivision	Liga Femenil
Santos Laguna	Fox	–	–
Tijuana	Fox	–	–
Toluca	Televisa	TelevisaUnivision	Liga Femenil
Tigres UANL	Fox	Fox Deportes/ Estrella TV/ NBCUniversal	–
Pumas UNAM	Televisa	TelevisaUnivision	Liga Femenil

- Source: Liga MX Femenil
1. All home matches are streamed on ViX.
2. All home matches are streamed on ViX. Selected matches may air on free-to-air channel El Nueve in Mexico.
3. Matches are streamed on Telemundo streaming platforms (Telemundo App, TelemundoDeportes.com, and Telemundo Deportes Youtube channel). Selected home matches are also televised on pay TV channel Universo.
4. Selected matches are streamed on ESPN+ and may air on ESPN Deportes either live or via tape-delay. Rights sublicensed from Fox Deportes.
5. All home matches are shown on TV Azteca digital platforms and Fox Sports Mexico simultaneously.
6. All home matches are shown on Fox Deportes either live or via tape-delay or on Fox Sports streaming platforms (Fox Sports App and foxsports.com).
7. All home matches are shown on an ESPN-branded linear TV network and streamed via Disney+ in Mexico, Central America and Dominican Republic, and streamed via Disney+ in Spanish-speaking South America effective 26 June 2024 after Star+ was shut down.
8. All home matches are streamed via the TVP account on Facebook.
9. All home matches are streamed on ViX. Selected matches may air on free-to-air channel El Nueve.
10. All home matches are streamed through Caliente TV digital platforms (www.caliente.tv, Facebook, Twitch, X, and Youtube) as well as being broadcast through Caliente TV own television channel.
11. All home matches are streamed through Liga MX Femenil digital platforms (YouTube, Facebook, and TikTok).
12. FOX Corporation's Liga MX Femenil match broadcasts in Mexico are produced by MEDIAPRO Mexico and airs on new pay TV channel Canal FOX, streaming via premium pay TV app Fox One (formerly Caliente TV) and via Free Advertising-supported Streaming Television (FAST) channels FOX en Tubi and FOX en Tubi Xtra on the Tubi app.
13. All home matches are broadcast through TVCuatro TV channels in the state of Guanajuato. Matches are also stream for free on any region in the world through TVCuatro's website.
14. Fox Deportes (linear pay TV channel in the USA and Puerto Rico) has sublicensed live US TV rights to all Chivas Femenil home matches from NBCUniversal Telemundo Enterprises under a cross-licensing arrangement effective July 2025.
15. NBCUniversal Telemundo Enterprises has sublicensed live US TV rights to all Juárez and Tigres men's and women's home matches from Fox Deportes under a cross-licensing arrangement effective July 2025.
16. Estrella TV (USA) has purchased US free-to-air broadcast and free streaming rights for Juárez and Tigres Femenil home matches.

== See also ==
- Category: Liga Femenil players
- Category: Liga Femenil managers
- Category: Liga Femenil seasons
- Sport in Mexico
- Mexican Football Federation
- Women's football in Mexico
- Mexican football league system
- Campeón de Campeonas
- Liga Mexicana de Fútbol Femenil
- Liga MX
