= 2017–18 C.D. Guadalajara (women) season =

Guadalajara
2017–18 season
- Chairman: Jorge Vergara
- Manager: Luis Camacho
- Stadium: Verde Valle; Estadio Akron
- Apertura: Winners (3rd)
- Clausura: 4th
- Top goalscorer: Brenda Viramontes (13 goals)
- Biggest win: Guadalajara 6–0 Santos Laguna (3 September 2017)
- Biggest defeat: Pachuca 2–0 Guadalajara (20 November 2017)
Home colours	Away colours

The 2017–18 season was Guadalajara's first competitive season and first season in the Liga MX Femenil, the top flight of Mexican women's football.

Guadalajara won the inaugural Liga MX Femenil tournament, defeating Pachuca in the Apertura 2017 final.

For the Clausura 2018 tournament, the team finished fourth overall, but failed to qualify for the playoffs.

== Squad ==
=== Apertura ===
No.	Nat.	Name	Date of birth (age)	Since
Goalkeepers
1	(Mexico)	Karen Gómez	10 June 1993 (aged 24)	2017
12	(Mexico)	Blanca Félix	25 March 1996 (aged 21)	2017
21	(Mexico)	Ana Paula Ruvalcaba	24 August 2001 (aged 15)	2017
Defenders
2	(Mexico)	Vanessa Sánchez	14 March 1995 (aged 22)	2017
13	(Mexico)	Daniela Pulido	29 April 2000 (aged 17)	2017
14	(Mexico)	Andrea Sánchez	31 March 1994 (aged 23)	2017
15	(Mexico)	Maya García	17 September 1999 (aged 17)	2017
16	(Mexico)	Priscila Padilla	11 December 1999 (aged 17)	2017
18	(Mexico)	Valeria Meza	8 November 1999 (aged 17)	2017
26	(Mexico)	Paloma Castro	15 September 2000 (aged 16)	2017
Midfielders
3	(Mexico)	Miriam García	14 February 1998 (aged 19)	2017
4	(Mexico)	Arlett Tovar	9 May 1997 (aged 20)	2017
6	(Mexico)	Susan Bejarano	7 August 1995 (aged 21)	2017
8	(Mexico)	Victoria Acevedo	16 January 1999 (aged 18)	2017
10	(Mexico)	Tania Morales (Captain)	22 December 1986 (aged 30)	2017
20	(Mexico)	Andrea Ruiz	17 November 1992 (aged 24)	2017
24	(Mexico)	Zellyka Arce	28 July 1997 (aged 20)	2017
27	(Mexico)	Lía Morán	8 November 2002 (aged 14)	2017
Forwards
7	(Mexico)	Daniela Carrandi	15 February 2000 (aged 17)	2017
9	(Mexico)	Brenda Viramontes	24 April 1995 (aged 22)	2017
11	(Mexico)	Norma Palafox	14 October 1998 (aged 18)	2017
17	(Mexico)	Lía Romero	27 July 2000 (aged 17)	2017
19	(Mexico)	Anette Vázquez	11 March 2002 (aged 15)	2017
23	(Mexico)	Jessica Benites	10 April 1989 (aged 28)	2017

=== Clausura ===
No.	Nat.	Name	Date of birth (age)	Since
Goalkeepers
1	(Mexico)	Karen Gómez	10 June 1993 (aged 24)	2017
12	(Mexico)	Blanca Félix	25 March 1996 (aged 21)	2017
21	(Mexico)	Ana Paula Ruvalcaba	24 August 2001 (aged 16)	2017
Defenders
2	(Mexico)	Vanessa Sánchez	14 March 1995 (aged 22)	2017
5	(Mexico)	Selene Valera	19 October 1994 (aged 23)	2018
13	(Mexico)	Daniela Pulido	29 April 2000 (aged 17)	2017
14	(Mexico)	Andrea Sánchez	31 March 1994 (aged 23)	2017
16	(Mexico)	Priscila Padilla	11 December 1999 (aged 18)	2017
18	(Mexico)	Valeria Meza	8 November 1999 (aged 18)	2017
30	(Mexico)	Alondra González	1 April 1995 (aged 22)	2018
Midfielders
3	(Mexico)	Miriam García	14 February 1998 (aged 19)	2017
4	(Mexico)	Arlett Tovar (Vice-captain)	9 May 1997 (aged 20)	2017
6	(Mexico)	Susan Bejarano	7 August 1995 (aged 22)	2017
10	(Mexico)	Tania Morales (Captain)	22 December 1986 (aged 31)	2017
20	(Mexico)	Catalina Magaña	29 January 1990 (aged 27)	2018
24	(Mexico)	Zellyka Arce	28 July 1997 (aged 20)	2017
28	(Mexico)	Nicole Pérez	30 August 2001 (aged 16)	2018
Forwards
7	(Mexico)	Daniela Carrandi	15 February 2000 (aged 17)	2017
9	(Mexico)	Brenda Viramontes	24 April 1995 (aged 22)	2017
11	(Mexico)	Norma Palafox	14 October 1998 (aged 19)	2017
17	(Mexico)	Lía Romero	27 July 2000 (aged 17)	2017
19	(Mexico)	Anette Vázquez	11 March 2002 (aged 15)	2017
23	(Mexico)	María Velázquez	25 March 1993 (aged 24)	2017
25	(Mexico)	Rubí Soto	14 October 1995 (aged 22)	2018
29	(Mexico)	Yesenia Uriarte	21 September 1994 (aged 23)	2018

== Transfers ==
=== Out ===
Pos.	Player	Moving to	Transfer window	Ref.
DF	(Mexico) Paloma Castro	Atlas	Winter	

== Coaching staff ==
Position	Staff
Manager	(Mexico) Luis Camacho
Assistant manager	(Mexico) Jorge Luis Peredo
Fitness coach	(Mexico) Oscar Morelos
Doctor	(Mexico) Raquel Montes
Medical assistant	(Mexico) Ariel de la Rosa

== Competitions ==
=== Overview ===
Competition	First match	Last match	Starting round	Final position	Record							
Competition	First match	Last match	Starting round	Final position	Pld	W	D	L	GF	GA	GD	Win %
Apertura	29 July 2017	24 November 2017	Matchday 1	Winners	18	13	2	3	42	16	+26	72.22
Clausura	6 January 2018	7 April 2018	Matchday 1	4th	14	9	2	3	30	13	+17	64.29
Total					32	22	4	6	72	29	+43	68.75

Source: Competitions

=== Torneo Apertura ===
==== League table ====
Pos	Team	Pld	W	D	L	GF	GA	GD	Pts	Qualification or relegation
1	América	14	11	2	1	48	11	+37	35	Advance to Liguilla (Note: The two best teams of each group advance to the semifinals of the Liguilla.)
2	UANL	14	11	1	2	51	7	+44	34	Advance to Liguilla
3	Guadalajara (C)	14	11	1	2	33	10	+23	34	Advance to Liguilla
4	Monterrey	14	10	1	3	38	17	+21	31	
5	Pachuca	14	9	3	2	36	16	+20	30	Advance to Liguilla

Source: Liga MX Femenil
Rules for classification: 1) Points; 2) Goal difference; 3) Number of goals scored; 4) Number of away goals scored; 5) Head-to-head results between tied teams; 6) Drawing of lots
(C) Champions

==== Matches ====
29 July 2017 1	Guadalajara	3–0	Atlas	Guadalajara, Jalisco
9:00	Vázquez 7'; Pulido 23', 50'	Report		Stadium: Chivas San Rafael; Referee: Lucila Venegas

5 August 2017 2	UANL	2–0	Guadalajara	San Nicolás de los Garza, Nuevo León
21:15	Solís 2'; Jaramillo 12'	Report		Stadium: Estadio Universitario; Referee: Oscar Eduardo Peña

12 August 2017 3	Guadalajara	1–0	Necaxa	Zapopan, Jalisco
11:00	A. Sánchez 72'	Report		Stadium: Verde Valle; Referee: Eduardo Aldahir Barriga

19 August 2017 4	Querétaro	1–3	Guadalajara	Querétaro City, Querétaro
11:30	Ruiz 76'	Report	Viramontes 3', 7', 60'	Stadium: Estadio Corregidora; Referee: Jonathan Morales

27 August 2017 5	Monterrey	2–1	Guadalajara	Guadalupe, Nuevo León
10:00	R. Bernal 61'; Monsiváis 90+1'	Report	Tovar 53'	Stadium: Estadio BBVA Bancomer; Referee: Fabián Gaspar

3 September 2017 6	Guadalajara	6–0	Santos Laguna	Zapopan, Jalisco
10:00	Tovar 42'; A. Sánchez 52'; Guevara 54' (o.g.); Morales 75'; Palafox 80'; Viramontes 88'	Report		Stadium: Verde Valle; Referee: Gil Emmanuel González

11 September 2017 7	León	1–3	Guadalajara	León, Guanajuato
21:00	Vargas 15'	Report	Vázquez 16'; Viramontes 40'; Tovar 89'	Stadium: Estadio León; Referee: Ricardo Norman

15 September 2017 8	Atlas	1–1	Guadalajara	Zapopan, Jalisco
11:00	Valera 45+1'	Report	Morales 13'	Stadium: Estadio Alfredo "Pistache" Torres; Referee: Abraham de Jesús Quirarte

29 September 2017 10	Necaxa	0–1	Guadalajara	Aguascalientes City, Aguascalientes
16:00		Report	Vázquez 29'	Stadium: Estadio Victoria; Referee: Ricardo Arias

8 October 2017 11	Guadalajara	6–2	Querétaro	Zapopan, Jalisco
12:00	Tovar 3'; Viramontes 12'; Morales 30', 80'; Mi. García 34'; Palafox 67'	Report	López 37'; Moreno 46'	Stadium: Verde Valle; Referee: Luis Roberto Martínez

15 October 2017 12	Guadalajara	1–0	Monterrey	Zapopan, Jalisco
12:00	Palafox 21'	Report		Stadium: Verde Valle; Referee: Oscar Yair Toledo

18 October 2017 9	Guadalajara	1–0	UANL	Zapopan, Jalisco
16:00	Palafox 57'	Report		Stadium: Verde Valle; Referee: Miguel Ángel Anaya

21 October 2017 13	Santos Laguna	1–2	Guadalajara	Torreón, Coahuila
10:00	Arvizu 53'	Report	Palafox 33'; Quiñones 60' (o.g.)	Stadium: Estadio Corona; Referee: Juan Rafael Canales

29 October 2017 14	Guadalajara	4–0	León	Zapopan, Jalisco
12:00	Morales 13'; Tovar 30'; Viramontes 44'; Palafox 90+1'	Report		Stadium: Verde Valle; Referee: Marco Antonio Vega

==== Playoffs ====
===== Semifinals =====
4 November 2017 First leg	Guadalajara	4–2	América	Zapopan, Jalisco
16:30	Morales 36', 80'; Tovar 68'; Carrandi 90+2'	Report	L. Cuevas 28'; Espinosa 31'	Stadium: Estadio Chivas; Referee: Lucila Venegas

11 November 2017 Second leg	América	2–2 (4–6 agg.)	Guadalajara	Tlalpan, Mexico City
16:00	Cázares 57'; C. Cuevas 86'	Report	Viramontes 8'; Palafox 52'	Stadium: Estadio Azteca; Referee: Quetzalli Alvarado

===== Final =====
20 November 2017 First leg	Pachuca	2–0	Guadalajara	Pachuca, Hidalgo
21:06	Ángeles 39'; Ocampo 67'	Report		Stadium: Estadio Hidalgo; Referee: Lucila Venegas

24 November 2017 Second leg	Guadalajara	3–0 (3–2 agg.)	Pachuca	Zapopan, Jalisco
20:06	Tovar 36', 55'; Palafox 68'	Report		Stadium: Estadio Chivas; Referee: Quetzalli Alvarado

=== Torneo Clausura ===
==== League table ====
Pos	Team	Pld	W	D	L	GF	GA	GD	Pts	Qualification or relegation
2	América	14	10	3	1	47	11	+36	33	Advance to Liguilla (Note: The two best teams of each group advance to the semifinals of the Liguilla.)
3	UANL (C)	14	10	1	3	38	16	+22	31	Advance to Liguilla
4	Guadalajara	14	9	2	3	30	13	+17	29	
5	Toluca	14	9	2	3	22	13	+9	29	Advance to Liguilla
6	Pachuca	14	9	1	4	32	13	+19	28	

Source: Liga MX Femenil
Rules for classification: 1) Points; 2) Goal difference; 3) Number of goals scored; 4) Number of away goals scored; 5) Head-to-head results between tied teams; 6) Drawing of lots
(C) Champions

==== Matches ====
6 January 2018 1	Querétaro	1–1	Guadalajara	Querétaro City, Querétaro
16:00	Romero 16'	Report	Morales 20'	Stadium: Estadio Corregidora; Referee: Francia González

13 January 2018 2	Guadalajara	2–0	Monterrey	Zapopan, Jalisco
16:30	Velázquez 39'; Bejarano 40'	Report		Stadium: Estadio Akron; Referee: Louis Adrian Vielmas

19 January 2018 3	Necaxa	1–2	Guadalajara	Aguascalientes City, Aguascalientes
16:00	Ovalle 31'	Report	Carrandi 80'; Morales 86'	Stadium: Estadio Victoria; Referee: Ramón Guerrero

27 January 2018 4	Guadalajara	3–1	Atlas	Zapopan, Jalisco
16:30	Viramontes 1'; Tovar 8'; Morales 26'	Report	Grano 16'	Stadium: Estadio Akron; Referee: Iván de Jesús Velasco

5 February 2018 5	Santos Laguna	1–4	Guadalajara	Torreón, Coahuila
21:00	Félix 20' (o.g.)	Report	Carrandi 22'; Padilla 52'; Tovar 31', 64'	Stadium: Estadio Corona; Referee: José Luis Luna

10 February 2018 6	Guadalajara	1–2	UANL	Zapopan, Jalisco
16:00	Morales 6'	Report	Cruz 11'; Luna 17'	Stadium: Verde Valle; Referee: Erik González

19 February 2018 7	León	0–3	Guadalajara	León, Guanajuato
21:00		Report	Morales 1'; Vázquez 49'; Viramontes 57'	Stadium: Estadio León; Referee: Edgardo Espejo

25 February 2018 8	Guadalajara	2–0	Querétaro	Zapopan, Jalisco
9:00	Palafox 25'; Soto 82'	Report		Stadium: Verde Valle; Referee: Gustavo Padilla

5 March 2018 9	Monterrey	1–1	Guadalajara	Guadalupe, Nuevo León
21:00	R. Bernal 5' (pen.)	Report	Soto 48'	Stadium: Estadio BBVA Bancomer; Referee: Antonio de Jesús Olalde

11 March 2018 10	Guadalajara	1–2	Necaxa	Zapopan, Jalisco
12:30	Velázquez 18'	Report	Huerta 1', 30'	Stadium: Verde Valle; Referee: Alan Enrique Martínez

17 March 2018 11	Atlas	1–3	Guadalajara	Zapopan, Jalisco
11:00	Duarte 14'	Report	Velázquez 15'; Palafox 23'; Viramontes 90+1'	Stadium: Estadio Alfredo "Pistache" Torres; Referee: Francia González

25 March 2018 12	Guadalajara	0–1	Santos Laguna	Zapopan, Jalisco
12:30		Report	Noriega 75'	Stadium: Verde Valle; Referee: Juan José Gutiérrez

2 April 2018 13	UANL	2–5	Guadalajara	San Nicolás de los Garza, Nuevo León
20:00	Jaramillo 22', 86'	Report	Soto 4', 47'; Viramontes 46', 63'; Tovar 62'	Stadium: Estadio Universitario; Referee: Ricardo Norman

7 April 2018 14	Guadalajara	2–0	León	Zapopan, Jalisco
16:00	Padilla 6'; Soto 54'	Report		Stadium: Estadio Akron; Referee: Edgardo Espejo

== Statistics ==
=== Appearances and goals ===
No.	Pos	Nat	Player	Total		Apertura		Clausura	
No.	Pos	Nat	Player	Apps	Goals	Apps	Goals	Apps	Goals
1	GK	(Mexico) MEX	Karen Gómez	3	0	2	0	1	0
2	DF	(Mexico) MEX	Vanessa Sánchez	27	0	15	0	12	0
3	MF	(Mexico) MEX	Miriam García	27	1	17	1	10	0
4	MF	(Mexico) MEX	Arlett Tovar	31	12	18	8	13	4
5	DF	(Mexico) MEX	Selene Valera	1	0	0	0	1	0
6	MF	(Mexico) MEX	Susan Bejarano	26	1	16	0	10	1
7	FW	(Mexico) MEX	Daniela Carrandi	20	3	14	1	6	2
8	MF	(Mexico) MEX	Victoria Acevedo	6	0	6	0	0	0
9	FW	(Mexico) MEX	Brenda Viramontes	31	13	18	8	13	5
10	MF	(Mexico) MEX	Tania Morales	30	12	18	7	12	5
11	FW	(Mexico) MEX	Norma Palafox	28	10	18	8	10	2
12	GK	(Mexico) MEX	Blanca Félix	24	0	12	0	12	0
13	DF	(Mexico) MEX	Daniela Pulido	21	2	13	2	8	0
14	DF	(Mexico) MEX	Andrea Sánchez	30	2	17	2	13	0
16	DF	(Mexico) MEX	Priscila Padilla	24	2	14	0	10	2
17	FW	(Mexico) MEX	Lía Romero	1	0	0	0	1	0
18	DF	(Mexico) MEX	Valeria Meza	17	0	13	0	4	0
19	FW	(Mexico) MEX	Anette Vázquez	27	4	16	3	11	1
20	MF	(Mexico) MEX	Catalina Magaña	3	0	0	0	3	0
21	GK	(Mexico) MEX	Ana Paula Rubalcava	6	0	5	0	1	0
23	FW	(Mexico) MEX	María Velázquez	9	3	0	0	9	3
24	MF	(Mexico) MEX	Zellyka Arce	15	0	9	0	6	0
25	FW	(Mexico) MEX	Rubí Soto	13	5	0	0	13	5
28	MF	(Mexico) MEX	Nicole Pérez	12	0	0	0	12	0
29	FW	(Mexico) MEX	Yesenia Uriarte	1	0	0	0	1	0
30	DF	(Mexico) MEX	Alondra González	4	0	0	0	4	0
Players that left the club during the season
20	MF	(Mexico) MEX	Andrea Ruiz	2	0	2	0	0	0
23	MF	(Mexico) MEX	Jessica Benites	7	0	7	0	0	0
26	DF	(Mexico) MEX	Paloma Castro	2	0	2	0	0	0

=== Goalscorers ===
Rank	Pos.	No.	Player	Apertura	Clausura	Total
1	FW	9	(Mexico) Brenda Viramontes	8	5	13
2	MF	4	(Mexico) Arlett Tovar	8	4	12
2	MF	10	(Mexico) Tania Morales	7	5	12
4	FW	11	(Mexico) Norma Palafox	8	2	10
5	FW	25	(Mexico) Rubí Soto	–	5	5
6	FW	19	(Mexico) Anette Vázquez	3	1	4
7	FW	7	(Mexico) Daniela Carrandi	1	2	3
7	FW	23	(Mexico) María Velázquez	–	3	3
9	DF	13	(Mexico) Daniela Pulido	2	0	2
9	DF	14	(Mexico) Andrea Sánchez	2	0	2
9	DF	16	(Mexico) Priscila Padilla	0	2	2
12	MF	3	(Mexico) Miriam García	1	0	1
12	MF	6	(Mexico) Susan Bejarano	0	1	1
Own goals				2	0	2
Total				42	30	72

=== Hat-tricks ===
Player	Against	Result	Date	Competition	Ref.
(Mexico) Brenda Viramontes	Querétaro	3–1 (A)	19 August 2017	Liga MX Femenil	

=== Own goals ===
Player	Against	Result	Date	Competition	Ref.
(Mexico) Blanca Félix	Santos Laguna	4–1 (A)	5 February 2018	Liga MX Femenil	
