= 2018–19 C.D. Guadalajara (women) season =

Guadalajara
2018–19 season
- Chairman: Jorge Vergara
- Manager: Luis Camacho (until 29 December); Luis Manuel Díaz (from 29 December)
- Stadium: Estadio Akron; Verde Valle
- Apertura: Semifinals (4th)
- Clausura: 8th
- Top goalscorer: Nicole Pérez (8 goals)
- Biggest win: Morelia 1–5 Guadalajara (20 August 2018)
- Biggest defeat: UANL 4–2 Guadalajara (3 December 2018)
Home colours	Away colours

The 2018–19 season was Guadalajara's second competitive season and second season in the Liga MX Femenil, the top flight of Mexican women's football.

Guadalajara finished fourth in the Apertura tournament, qualifying for the playoffs, but were eliminated in semifinals by UANL.

The next tournament, the Clausura 2019, the team finished eight overall, failing to qualify for the playoffs.

For the Clausura tournament, manager Luis Camacho was replaced by Luis Manuel Díaz, who led the team for the rest of the season.

== Squad ==
=== Apertura ===
No.	Nat.	Name	Date of birth (age)	Since
Goalkeepers
1	(Mexico)	Karen Gómez	10 June 1993 (aged 25)	2017
12	(Mexico)	Blanca Félix	25 March 1996 (aged 22)	2017
21	(Mexico)	Ana Paula Ruvalcaba	24 August 2001 (aged 16)	2017
Defenders
2	(Mexico)	Vanessa Sánchez	14 March 1995 (aged 23)	2017
3	(Mexico)	Miriam García	14 February 1998 (aged 20)	2017
4	(Mexico)	Arlett Tovar (Vice-captain)	9 May 1997 (aged 21)	2017
13	(Mexico)	Daniela Pulido	29 April 2000 (aged 18)	2017
14	(Mexico)	Andrea Sánchez	31 March 1994 (aged 24)	2017
16	(Mexico)	Priscila Padilla	11 December 1999 (aged 18)	2017
26	(Mexico)	Araceli Torres	15 September 2000 (aged 17)	2018
27	(Mexico)	Kinberly Guzmán	19 September 2002 (aged 15)	2018
29	(Mexico)	Esmeralda Zamarrón	23 July 2001 (aged 16)	2018
Midfielders
5	(Mexico)	Yazmín Álvarez	7 April 1996 (aged 22)	2017
6	(Mexico)	Susan Bejarano	7 August 1995 (aged 22)	2017
8	(Mexico)	Victoria Acevedo	16 January 1999 (aged 19)	2017
10	(Mexico)	Tania Morales (Captain)	22 December 1986 (aged 31)	2017
15	(Mexico)	Miriam Castillo	1 June 1992 (aged 26)	2018
20	(Mexico)	Gabriela Huerta	12 January 1999 (aged 19)	2018
28	(Mexico)	Nicole Pérez	30 August 2001 (aged 16)	2018
Forwards
9	(Mexico)	Brenda Viramontes	24 April 1995 (aged 23)	2017
11	(Mexico)	Norma Palafox	14 October 1998 (aged 19)	2017
17	(Mexico)	Lía Romero	27 July 2000 (aged 17)	2017
19	(Mexico)	Anette Vázquez	11 March 2002 (aged 16)	2017
23	(Mexico)	María Velázquez	25 March 1993 (aged 25)	2017
25	(Mexico)	Rubí Soto	14 October 1995 (aged 22)	2018

=== Clausura ===
No.	Nat.	Name	Date of birth (age)	Since
Goalkeepers
12	(Mexico)	Blanca Félix	25 March 1996 (aged 22)	2017
21	(Mexico)	Ana Paula Ruvalcaba	24 August 2001 (aged 17)	2017
33	(Mexico)	Celeste Espino	9 August 2003 (aged 15)	2019
Defenders
2	(Mexico)	Vanessa Sánchez	14 March 1995 (aged 23)	2017
4	(Mexico)	Arlett Tovar (Vice-captain)	9 May 1997 (aged 21)	2017
13	(Mexico)	Daniela Pulido	29 April 2000 (aged 18)	2017
14	(Mexico)	Andrea Sánchez	31 March 1994 (aged 24)	2017
16	(Mexico)	Priscila Padilla	11 December 1999 (aged 19)	2017
26	(Mexico)	Araceli Torres	15 September 2000 (aged 18)	2018
27	(Mexico)	Kinberly Guzmán	19 September 2002 (aged 16)	2018
34	(Mexico)	Sonia Cabrera	7 November 1994 (aged 24)	2019
Midfielders
5	(Mexico)	Yazmín Álvarez	7 April 1996 (aged 22)	2017
6	(Mexico)	Susan Bejarano	7 August 1995 (aged 23)	2017
8	(Mexico)	Victoria Acevedo	16 January 1999 (aged 19)	2017
10	(Mexico)	Tania Morales (Captain)	22 December 1986 (aged 32)	2017
15	(Mexico)	Miriam Castillo	1 June 1992 (aged 26)	2018
20	(Mexico)	Gabriela Huerta	12 January 1999 (aged 19)	2018
28	(Mexico)	Nicole Pérez	30 August 2001 (aged 17)	2018
30	(Mexico)	Samara Alcalá	27 February 1998 (aged 20)	2019
32	(Mexico)	Dulce Pizano	5 April 2001 (aged 17)	2019
Forwards
9	(Mexico)	Brenda Viramontes	24 April 1995 (aged 23)	2017
11	(Mexico)	Norma Palafox	14 October 1998 (aged 20)	2017
19	(Mexico)	Anette Vázquez	11 March 2002 (aged 16)	2017
23	(Mexico)	María Velázquez	25 March 1993 (aged 25)	2017
25	(Mexico)	Rubí Soto	14 October 1995 (aged 23)	2018

== Transfers ==
=== In ===
Pos.	Player	Moving from	Transfer window	Ref.
MF	(Mexico) Gabriela Huerta	Necaxa	Summer	
MF	(Mexico) Samara Alcalá	Atlas	Winter	

=== Out ===
Pos.	Player	Moving to	Transfer window	Ref.
MF	(Mexico) Zellyka Arce	Atlas	Summer	
FW	(Mexico) Daniela Carrandi	Atlético San Luis	Summer	
DF	(Mexico) Alondra González	América	Summer	
DF	(Mexico) Valeria Meza	Necaxa	Summer	
DF	(Mexico) Selene Valera	León	Summer	
GK	(Mexico) Karen Gómez	Cruz Azul	Winter	

== Coaching staff ==
=== Apertura ===
Position	Staff
Manager	(Mexico) Luis Camacho
Assistant manager	(Mexico) Jorge Luis Peredo
Fitness coach	(Mexico) Edgar Flores
Doctor	(Mexico) Navid Rodríguez
Medical assistant	(Mexico) Alejandro Ramírez

=== Clausura ===
Position	Staff
Manager	(Mexico) Luis Manuel Díaz
Assistant manager	(Mexico) Gregorio Sánchez
Assistant manager	(Mexico) Felipe Robles
Assistant manager	(Mexico) Oscar Morelos
Fitness coach	(Mexico) Edgar Flores
Doctor	(Mexico) Navid Rodríguez
Medical assistant	(Mexico) Alejandro Ramírez

== Competitions ==
=== Overview ===
Competition	First match	Last match	Starting round	Final position	Record							
Competition	First match	Last match	Starting round	Final position	Pld	W	D	L	GF	GA	GD	Win %
Apertura	16 July 2018	3 December 2018	Matchday 1	Semifinals (4th)	20	9	7	4	34	24	+10	45.00
Clausura	6 January 2019	7 April 2019	Matchday 1	8th	16	7	2	7	17	17	+0	43.75
Total					36	16	9	11	51	41	+10	44.44

Source: Competitions

=== Torneo Apertura ===
==== League table ====
Pos	Team	Pld	W	D	L	GF	GA	GD	Pts	Qualification or relegation
2	Pachuca	16	12	2	2	31	14	+17	38	Advance to Liguilla (Note: The top four teams of each group advance to the quarterfinals of the Liguilla.)
3	América (C)	16	11	2	3	28	12	+16	35	Advance to Liguilla
4	Guadalajara	16	9	4	3	30	16	+14	31	Advance to Liguilla
5	Monterrey	16	8	6	2	38	15	+23	30	Advance to Liguilla
6	Toluca	16	9	3	4	37	17	+20	30	Advance to Liguilla

Source: Liga MX Femenil
Rules for classification: 1) Points; 2) Goal difference; 3) Number of goals scored; 4) Number of away goals scored; 5) Head-to-head results between tied teams; 6) Drawing of lots
(C) Champions

==== Matches ====
16 July 2018 1	Guadalajara	1–0	León	Zapopan, Jalisco
19:00	Huerta 7'	Report		Stadium: Estadio Akron; Referee: Francia González

21 July 2018 2	Atlas	0–2	Guadalajara	Guadalajara, Jalisco
11:00		Report	Soto 18'; Viramontes 61'	Stadium: Estadio Jalisco; Referee: Priscila Pérez

29 July 2018 3	Guadalajara	3–1	Santos Laguna	Zapopan, Jalisco
12:30	Palafox 5', 83'; Pérez 81'	Report	Trasviña 82'	Stadium: Verde Valle; Referee: Iván de Jesús Velasco

6 August 2018 4	Monterrey	0–0	Guadalajara	Guadalupe, Nuevo León
21:00		Report		Stadium: Estadio BBVA Bancomer; Referee: Lizzet García

13 August 2018 5	Guadalajara	1–0	Necaxa	Zapopan, Jalisco
16:30	Viramontes 42'	Report		Stadium: Verde Valle; Referee: Lucila Venegas

20 August 2018 6	Morelia	1–5	Guadalajara	Morelia, Michoacán
16:00	Pasco 80'	Report	Palafox 12', 38'; Vázquez 16'; Morales 44'; Pérez 90'	Stadium: Estadio Morelos; Referee: Alexa Viera

10 September 2018 8	Guadalajara	1–3	UANL	Zapopan, Jalisco
19:00	Palafox 26'	Report	Martínez 1', 7'; Jaramillo 33'	Stadium: Estadio Akron; Referee: Karen Hernández

13 September 2018 9	Querétaro	0–0	Guadalajara	Querétaro City, Querétaro
16:00		Report		Stadium: Estadio Corregidora; Referee: Alexa Viera

17 September 2018 10	León	3–5	Guadalajara	León, Guanajuato
19:00	García 15', 54'; Muñoz 71'	Report	Castillo 23'; Pérez 41'; Tovar 63'; Álvarez 66'; Viramontes 89'	Stadium: Estadio León; Referee: Guadalupe Arellano

24 September 2018 11	Guadalajara	2–0	Atlas	Zapopan, Jalisco
19:00	García 1'; Tovar 73'	Report		Stadium: Estadio Akron; Referee: Priscila Pérez

1 October 2018 12	Santos Laguna	1–3	Guadalajara	Torreón, Coahuila
21:00	Flores 74'	Report	Soto 60', 90+3'; Tovar 90'	Stadium: Estadio Corona; Referee: Diana Pérez

15 October 2018 13	Guadalajara	1–3	Monterrey	Zapopan, Jalisco
19:00	Padilla 4'	Report	Monsiváis 7', 11', 32'	Stadium: Estadio Akron; Referee: Katia García

19 October 2018 14	Necaxa	0–3	Guadalajara	Aguascalientes City, Aguascalientes
16:00		Report	García 51'; A. Sánchez 56'; Muñoz 63' (o.g.)	Stadium: Estadio Victoria; Referee: Ana Cristina Alfaro

24 October 2018 15	Guadalajara	1–1	Morelia	Zapopan, Jalisco
16:00	Palafox 17'	Report	Rodríguez 65'	Stadium: Verde Valle; Referee: Lucila Venegas

5 November 2018 17	UANL	2–1	Guadalajara	San Nicolás de los Garza, Nuevo León
20:00	Ovalle 57'; Cruz 87'	Report	Soto 32'	Stadium: Estadio Universitario; Referee: Katia García

17 November 2018 18	Guadalajara	1–1	Querétaro	Zapopan, Jalisco
10:00	Tovar 90+1' (pen.)	Report	Villuendas 59'	Stadium: Verde Valle; Referee: Guadalupe Arellano

==== Playoffs ====
===== Quarterfinals =====
22 November 2018 First leg	Monterrey	1–1	Guadalajara	Guadalupe, Nuevo León
19:00	Bernal 5'	Report	Monsiváis 46' (o.g.)	Stadium: Estadio BBVA Bancomer; Referee: Guadalupe Arellano

25 November 2018 Second leg	Guadalajara	0–0 (1–1 (a.) agg.)	Monterrey	Zapopan, Jalisco
19:00		Report		Stadium: Estadio Akron; Referee: Priscila Pérez

==== Semifinals ====
30 November 2018 First leg	Guadalajara	1–1	UANL	Zapopan, Jalisco
20:00	Viramontes 16'	Report	Cruz 32'	Stadium: Estadio Akron; Referee: Gustavo Padilla

3 December 2018 Second leg	UANL	4–2 (5–3 agg.)	Guadalajara	San Nicolás de los Garza, Nuevo León
20:00	Mercado 15'; Ovalle 31'; Espinoza 41'; Jaramillo 90+1'	Report	Bejarano 29'; Palafox 39'	Stadium: Estadio Universitario; Referee: Quetzalli Alvarado

=== Torneo Clausura ===
==== League table ====
Pos	Team	Pld	W	D	L	GF	GA	GD	Pts	Qualification or relegation
6	Puebla	16	8	4	4	13	10	+3	28	Advance to Liguilla (Note: The top four teams of each group advance to the quarterfinals of the Liguilla.)
7	León	16	7	3	6	21	23	−2	24	Advance to Liguilla
8	Guadalajara	16	7	2	7	17	17	0	23	
9	UNAM	16	7	1	8	19	16	+3	22	Advance to Liguilla
10	BUAP (Note: The BUAP v Cruz Azul match resulted in a 1–1 draw, but was later ruled a 3–0 victory for BUAP due to Cruz Azul aligning three overage players on the field at the same time. Clubs are allowed to register up to four players older than 24 per match but only two can be on the field at the same time.)	16	6	3	7	20	17	+3	21	

Source: Liga MX Femenil
Rules for classification: 1) Points; 2) Goal difference; 3) Number of goals scored; 4) Number of away goals scored; 5) Head-to-head results between tied teams; 6) Drawing of lots

==== Matches ====
7 January 2019 1	Guadalajara	2–0	León	Zapopan, Jalisco
19:00	Tovar 6'; Soto 19'	Report		Stadium: Estadio Akron; Referee: Lizzet García

12 January 2019 2	Atlas	2–0	Guadalajara	Zapopan, Jalisco
11:00	Pérez 6'; Robles 45+1'	Report		Stadium: Estadio Alfredo "Pistache" Torres; Referee: Katia García

21 January 2019 3	Guadalajara	0–0	Santos Laguna	Zapopan, Jalisco
21:00		Report		Stadium: Estadio Akron; Referee: Priscila Pérez

24 January 2019 4	Monterrey	2–1	Guadalajara	Guadalupe, Nuevo León
21:00	Armenta 22'; Cadena 83'	Report	Pérez 9'	Stadium: Estadio BBVA Bancomer; Referee: Diana Pérez

27 January 2019 5	Guadalajara	1–0	Necaxa	Zapopan, Jalisco
12:30	Castillo 72'	Report		Stadium: Verde Valle; Referee: Lucila Venegas

3 February 2019 6	Morelia	0–1	Guadalajara	Morelia, Michoacán
12:00		Report	Padilla 21'	Stadium: Estadio Morelos; Referee: Karen Hernández

18 February 2019 8	Guadalajara	0–0	UANL	Zapopan, Jalisco
19:00		Report		Stadium: Estadio Akron; Referee: Priscila Pérez

21 February 2019 9	Querétaro	0–1	Guadalajara	Querétaro City, Querétaro
16:00		Report	Soto 22'	Stadium: Estadio Corregidora; Referee: Quetzalli Alvarado

25 February 2019 10	León	1–2	Guadalajara	León, Guanajuato
21:00	Valdez 3'	Report	Pérez 21' (pen.), 66' (pen.)	Stadium: Estadio León; Referee: Karen Hernández

4 March 2019 11	Guadalajara	1–2	Atlas	Zapopan, Jalisco
19:00	Pérez 14'	Report	Rodríguez 19'; A. Sánchez 24' (o.g.)	Stadium: Estadio Akron; Referee: Katia García

11 March 2019 12	Santos Laguna	3–1	Guadalajara	Torreón, Coahuila
21:00	Ramírez 9'; Ojeda 18'; Peraza 42'	Report	Ojeda 26' (o.g.)	Stadium: Estadio Corona; Referee: Diana Pérez

18 March 2019 13	Guadalajara	0–1	Monterrey	Zapopan, Jalisco
19:00		Report	Bernal 9'	Stadium: Estadio Akron; Referee: Quetzalli Alvarado

22 March 2019 14	Necaxa	1–2	Guadalajara	Aguascalientes City, Aguascalientes
16:00	Sánchez 90+1'	Report	Morales 32'; Huerta 89'	Stadium: Estadio Victoria; Referee: Lucila Venegas

31 March 2019 15	Guadalajara	1–2	Morelia	Zapopan, Jalisco
9:00	Huerta 48'	Report	Calderón 62'; Torres 89' (o.g.)	Stadium: Verde Valle; Referee: Karen Hernández

15 April 2019 17	UANL	2–1	Guadalajara	San Nicolás de los Garza, Nuevo León
20:00	Cruz 4'; Padilla 87' (o.g.)	Report	Huerta 7'	Stadium: Estadio Universitario; Referee: Priscila Pérez

21 April 2019 18	Guadalajara	3–1	Querétaro	Zapopan, Jalisco
12:30	Soto 52'; Castillo 56'; Pérez 60' (pen.)	Report	Arredondo 30'	Stadium: Verde Valle; Referee: Harold Rodríguez

== Statistics ==
=== Appearances and goals ===
No.	Pos	Nat	Player	Total		Apertura		Clausura	
No.	Pos	Nat	Player	Apps	Goals	Apps	Goals	Apps	Goals
2	DF	(Mexico) MEX	Vanessa Sánchez	33	0	20	0	13	0
3	MF	(Mexico) MEX	Miriam García	12	2	12	2	0	0
4	DF	(Mexico) MEX	Arlett Tovar	33	5	18	4	15	1
5	DF	(Mexico) MEX	Yazmín Álvarez	21	1	14	1	7	0
6	MF	(Mexico) MEX	Susan Bejarano	24	1	15	1	9	0
8	MF	(Mexico) MEX	Victoria Acevedo	16	0	8	0	8	0
9	FW	(Mexico) MEX	Brenda Viramontes	24	4	17	4	7	0
10	MF	(Mexico) MEX	Tania Morales	33	2	17	1	16	1
11	FW	(Mexico) MEX	Norma Palafox	31	7	20	7	11	0
12	GK	(Mexico) MEX	Blanca Félix	32	0	17	0	15	0
13	DF	(Mexico) MEX	Daniela Pulido	11	0	9	0	2	0
14	DF	(Mexico) MEX	Andrea Sánchez	32	1	18	1	14	0
15	MF	(Mexico) MEX	Miriam Castillo	36	3	20	1	16	2
16	DF	(Mexico) MEX	Priscila Padilla	28	2	14	1	14	1
17	FW	(Mexico) MEX	Lía Romero	2	0	2	0	0	0
19	FW	(Mexico) MEX	Anette Vázquez	17	1	6	1	11	0
20	MF	(Mexico) MEX	Gabriela Huerta	20	4	10	1	10	3
21	GK	(Mexico) MEX	Ana Paula Rubalcava	3	0	2	0	1	0
23	FW	(Mexico) MEX	María Velázquez	12	0	8	0	4	0
25	FW	(Mexico) MEX	Rubí Soto	27	7	15	4	12	3
26	DF	(Mexico) MEX	Araceli Torres	17	0	3	0	14	0
27	DF	(Mexico) MEX	Kinberly Guzmán	2	0	0	0	2	0
28	MF	(Mexico) MEX	Nicole Pérez	25	8	10	3	15	5
29	DF	(Mexico) MEX	Esmeralda Zamarrón	1	0	1	0	0	0
30	MF	(Mexico) MEX	Samara Alcalá	2	0	0	0	2	0
Players that left the club during the season
1	GK	(Mexico) MEX	Karen Gómez	1	0	1	0	0	0

=== Goalscorers ===
Rank	Pos.	No.	Player	Apertura	Clausura	Total
1	MF	28	(Mexico) Nicole Pérez	3	5	8
2	FW	11	(Mexico) Norma Palafox	7	0	7
2	FW	25	(Mexico) Rubí Soto	4	3	7
4	DF	4	(Mexico) Arlett Tovar	4	1	5
5	FW	9	(Mexico) Brenda Viramontes	4	0	4
5	MF	20	(Mexico) Gabriela Huerta	1	3	4
7	MF	15	(Mexico) Miriam Castillo	1	2	3
8	DF	3	(Mexico) Miriam García	2	0	2
8	MF	10	(Mexico) Tania Morales	1	1	2
8	DF	16	(Mexico) Priscila Padilla	1	1	2
11	MF	5	(Mexico) Yazmín Álvarez	1	0	1
11	MF	6	(Mexico) Susan Bejarano	1	0	1
11	DF	14	(Mexico) Andrea Sánchez	1	0	1
11	FW	19	(Mexico) Anette Vázquez	1	0	1
Own goals				2	1	3
Total				34	17	51

=== Own goals ===
Player	Against	Result	Date	Competition
(Mexico) Andrea Sánchez	Atlas	1–2 (H)	4 March 2019	Liga MX Femenil
(Mexico) Araceli Torres	Morelia	1–2 (H)	31 March 2019	Liga MX Femenil
(Mexico) Priscila Padilla	UANL	1–2 (A)	15 April 2019	Liga MX Femenil
