= Rubí Soto =

Mexican footballer (born 1995)

Personal information
- Full name: Kristal Rubí Soto Cruz
- Date of birth: 14 October 1995 (age 31)
- Place of birth: Ahome, Sinaloa, Mexico
- Height: 1.63 m (5 ft 4 in)
- Position: Winger

Team information
- Current team: León
- Number: 15

Senior career*
Years	Team	Apps	(Gls)
2018–2024	Guadalajara	143	(31)
2020–2021	→ Villarreal (loan)	18	(2)
2025–	León	37	(7)
- * Club domestic league appearances and goals as of 9 February 2026

Kristal Rubí Soto Cruz (born 14 October 1995), known as Rubí Soto, is a Mexican professional footballer who plays as a forward for Club León.

== Early life ==
Soto attended the Universidad del Valle del Fuerte where she played for the football team.

== Club career ==
=== 2018–2020: Guadalajara ===
Soto signed for Guadalajara in December 2017 for the Closura tournament of the inaugural season of the Liga MX Femenil. She scored her first goal for the team during a 2–0 win over Querétaro on February 25, 2018. During a match against Tigres UANL, she scored two goals (a brace). During a match against C.F. Monterrey, she scored an equalizer.

=== 2020–2021: Villarreal ===
On 23 June 2020, Soto was signed by Villarreal CF to play in the Spanish Segunda División Pro. She became the first homegrown player from the Liga MX Femenil to receive an offer to play in Europe, without having been previously called up by Mexico at any level.

== Career statistics ==
=== Club ===
As of match played 28 August 2020

Appearances and goals by club, season and competition (Note: includes Liga MX Femenil regular season and playoffs.)
Club	Season	League			Total	
Club	Season	Division	Apps	Goals	Apps	Goals
Guadalajara	2017–18	Liga MX Femenil	13	5	13	5
Guadalajara	2018–19	Liga MX Femenil	27	7	27	7
Guadalajara	2019–20	Liga MX Femenil	27	8	27	8
Guadalajara	Total		67	20	67	20
Career total			67	20	67	20
