= Luis Camacho =

Luis Camacho may refer to:

- Luis Camacho (footballer)
- Luis Camacho (dancer)
