= Heidi González =

Mexican footballer (born 2001)

Personal information
- Full name: Heidi Karina González Vite
- Date of birth: 30 January 2001 (age 25)
- Place of birth: Naucalpan de Juárez, State of Mexico, Mexico
- Height: 1.68 m (5 ft 6 in)
- Position: Goalkeeper

Team information
- Current team: Guadalajara
- Number: 1

Senior career*
Years	Team	Apps	(Gls)
2018–2020	América	9	(0)
2020–2021	Atlético San Luis	7	(0)
2021–2022	Toluca	5	(0)
2022–2026	UNAM	30	(0)
2026–	Guadalajara	0	(0)
- * Club domestic league appearances and goals as of 31 January 2026 ‡ National team caps and goals as of 12 March 2022

Heidi Karina González Vite (born 30 January 2001) is a Mexican professional footballer who plays as a goalkeeper for Liga MX Femenil side Guadalajara.

In 2018, she started her career in América. In 2020, she was transferred to Atlético San Luis. In 2021, she joined Toluca. Since 2022, she is part of UNAM.
