= Antonio Contreras =

Spanish football manager

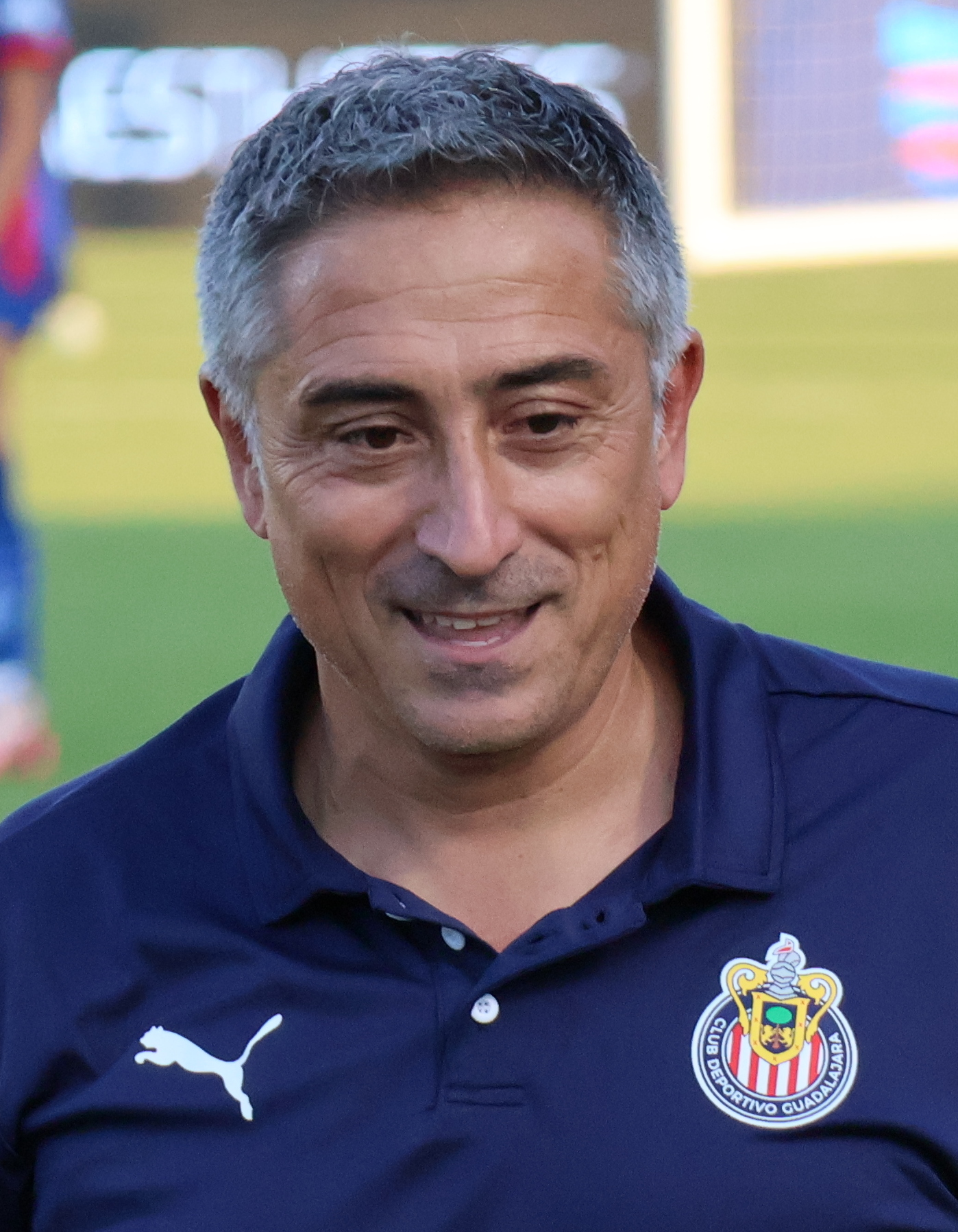
- Contreras with Guadalajara in 2025

Personal information
- Full name: Antonio Contreras Olivera
- Date of birth: 19 July 1977 (age 49)
- Place of birth: Badajoz, Spain
- Height: 1.73 m (5 ft 8 in)

Team information
- Current team: Guadalajara (women) (manager)

Managerial career
- Years: Team
- 2004–2008: CF Puebla
- 2008–2011: Atlético Madrid (women)
- 2011–2015: Levante (women)
- 2016–2017: Arsenal (women) (assistant)
- 2017–2019: Málaga (women)
- 2019–2021: Real Betis (women)
- 2023: Pomigliano CF
- 2025–: Guadalajara (women)

Antonio Contreras Olivera (born 19 July 1977) is a Spanish football manager who has been the manager of Liga MX Femenil club Guadalajara since January 2025.

== Career ==
Contreras was put in charge of the Atlético Madrid ahead of the 2008–09 season. In 2023, Contreras was named the head coach of Pomigliano CF. In 2025, Fernández was appointed as manager of Guadalajara in the Liga MX Femenil.
