= Daniela Pulido =

Mexican football player (born 2000)

Personal information
- Full name: Daniela Pulido Saldaña
- Date of birth: 29 April 2000 (age 26)
- Place of birth: Guadalajara, Jalisco Mexico
- Height: 1.67 m (5 ft 6 in)
- Position: Defender

Senior career*
Years	Team	Apps	(Gls)
2017–2020	Guadalajara	30	(2)
- * Club domestic league appearances and goals

Daniela Pulido Saldaña (born 29 April 2000), known as Daniela Pulido, is a Mexican professional footballer who plays as a defender who played for Guadalajara (Chivas) of the Liga MX Femenil, the first professional women's soccer league in Mexico. In 2017, she helped Chivas win the first professional women's soccer championship in the country at the age of 17 in front of a record-breaking 32,466 spectators.

== Early life ==
Pulido began playing football at the age of five. As a young girl, she endured abusive bullying behavior from other children and parents because she was a girl player, but kept training and playing.

== Playing career ==
=== Guadalajara, 2017– ===
Pulido began playing for Guadalajara during the inaugural season of Liga MX Femenil. In July 2017, she scored two goals to become the first player to record a brace at the Tapatío Women's Classic and lead the team to win.

== Honours ==
=== Club ===
Guadalajara

- Liga MX Femenil: Apertura 2017
