= Tania Morales =

Mexican footballer (born 1986)

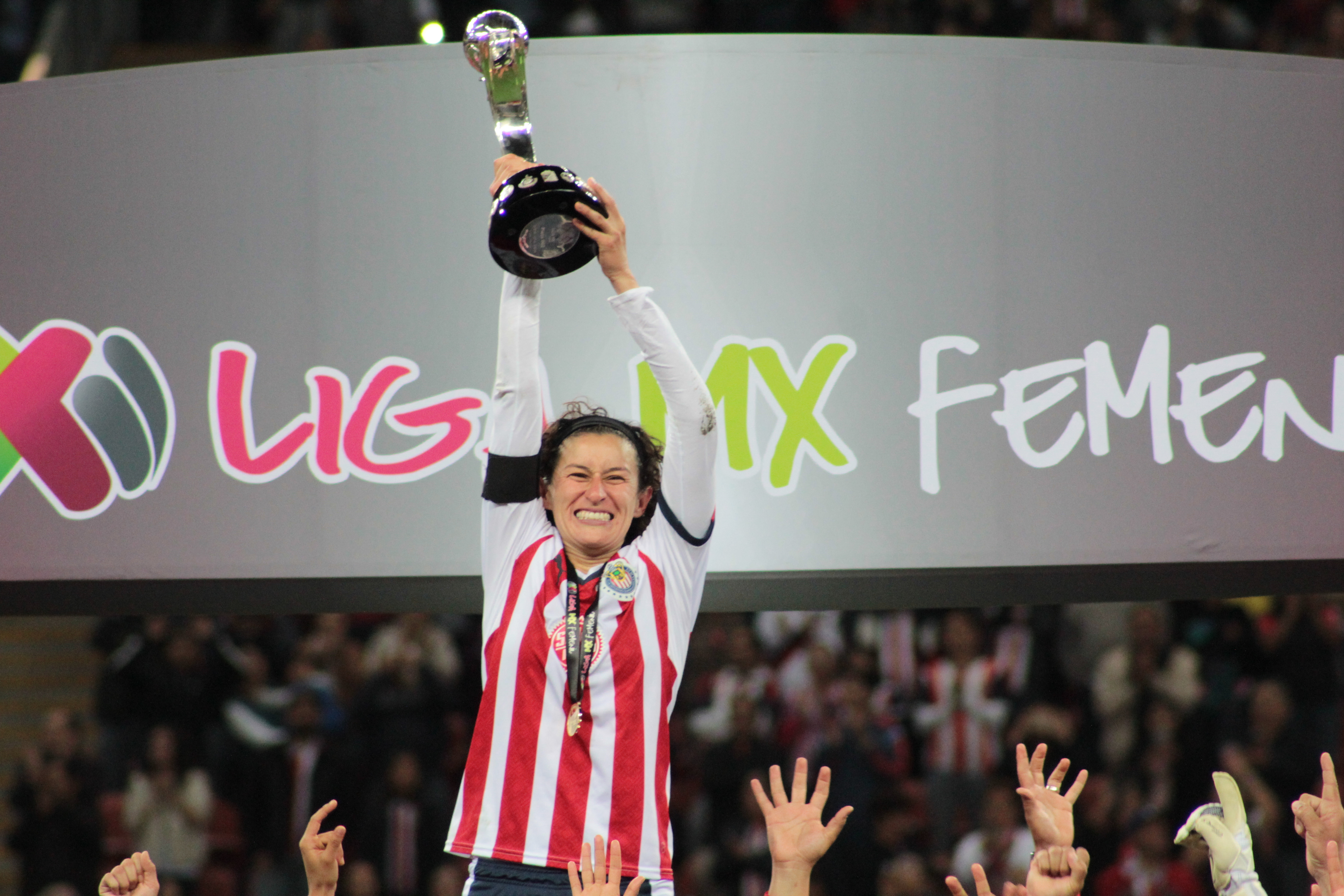
- Morales in 2017 after winning the Liga MX Femenil championship with Guadalajara

Personal information
- Full name: Tania Paola Morales Bazarte
- Date of birth: 22 December 1986 (age 39)
- Place of birth: Guadalajara, Jalisco, Mexico
- Height: 1.67 m (5 ft 6 in)
- Position: Attacking midfielder

Senior career*
Years	Team	Apps	(Gls)
2017–2021	Guadalajara	88	(17)
2022	Cruz Azul	16	(1)
2022–2023	Atlas	26	(2)
2023	Querétaro	14	(2)

International career
2002–2006	Mexico U-20	2	(0)
2005–2018	Mexico	8	(2)
- * Club domestic league appearances and goals as of 1 September 2020

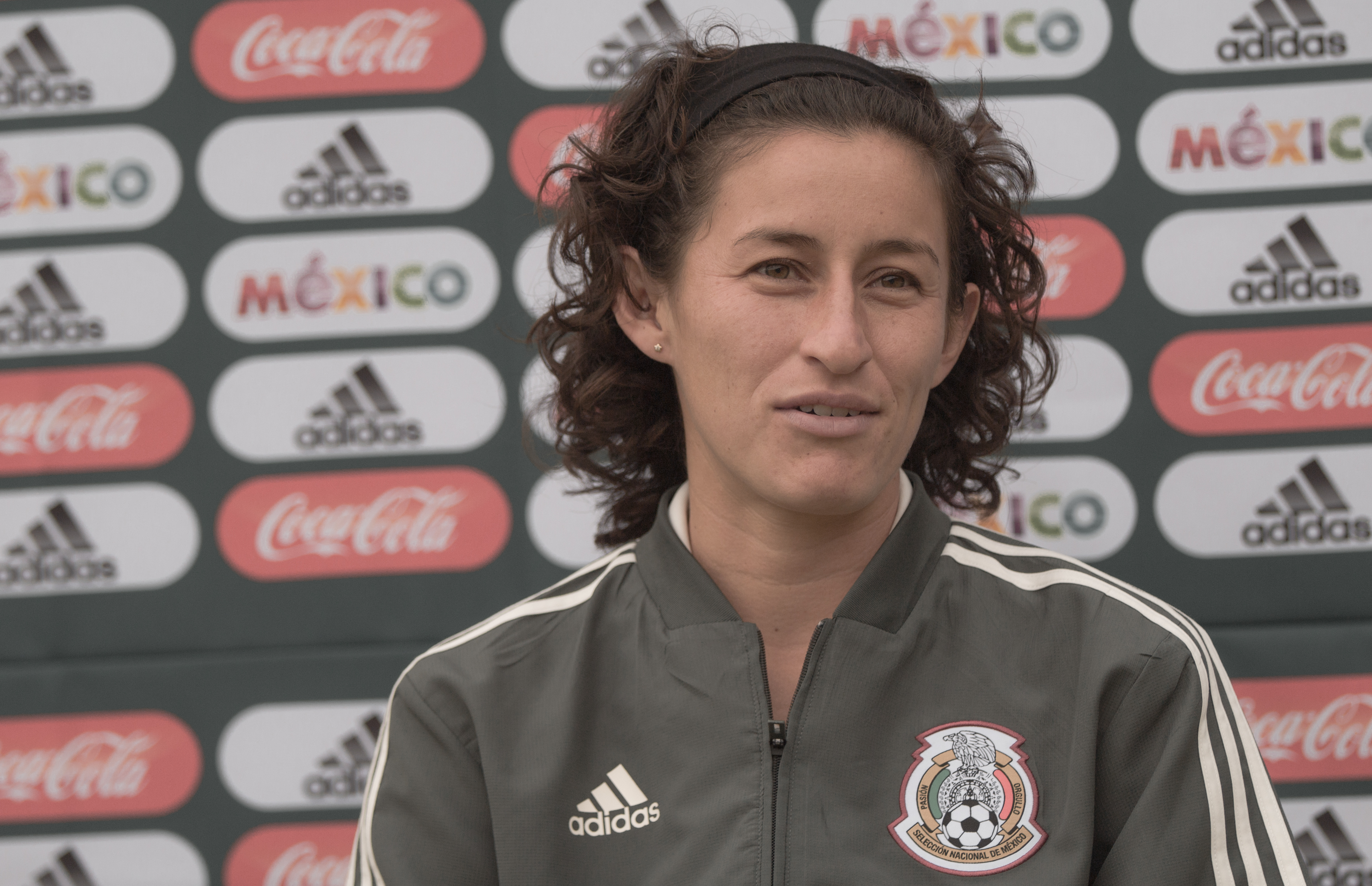
Morales in 2016 at a press conference for the Mexico women's national football team.

Tania Paola Morales Bazarte (born 22 December 1986), known as Tania Morales, is a former Mexican footballer who last played as a midfielder in the Liga MX Femenil and the Mexico national team. Internationally, she has represented Mexico's under-20 and senior teams.

From 2017 to 2021, she was a member of C. D. Guadalajara, nicknamed the Chivas and the Rebaño Sagrado, where she was the team's captain. In 2022 she was traded to Cruz Azul where was also the captain. In 2023 she played with Querétaro. On 2 December 2023, Morales announced her retirement from football.

== Club career ==
Tania Morales was born in Guadalajara, Jalisco on 22 December 1986.

In 2017, Morales joined Guadalajara and was chosen as captain of the team for the inaugural season of the Liga MX Femenil. She scored seven goals and tallied two assists during the Apertura tournament. On 4 November 2017, Morales scored the first and only Olympic goal in the league.

The Chivas won the league championship on 24 November 2017 after defeating Pachuca in the second match of a two-match playoff. Morales had an assist in the victory. The matches drew record-setting crowds of 28,955 and 32,466 spectators.

In the Clausura 2018 tournament Morales scored five goals.

As of September 2020, Morales is the player who has made most appearances in Guadalajara history.

== International career ==
Morales played for Mexico in the 2006 FIFA U-20 Women's World Championship contested in Russia, where the Mexican squad was eliminated at the group stage.

Playing for the Mexican senior team, on 2 April 2008, Morales scored two goals in a match with Jamaica as Mexico competed unsuccessfully to qualify for the 2008 Olympic Games. At the 2010 CONCACAF Women's Gold Cup, Morales played in all five matches as Mexico succeeded in qualifying for the 2011 FIFA Women's World Cup. At the Gold Cup, Morales was a substitute in the match against the United States on 5 November 2010 where Mexico won 2–1. U.S. Soccer called the match a "stunning upset" and the "biggest result in Mexican women's football history. Morales was a starter in a follow-up game with against the United States on 5 June 2011 which Mexico lost 0–1. However, Morales, although a member of the Mexican team, did not play in the 2011 FIFA Women's World Cup.

On 27 November 2017, Morales was selected by the national team to participate in preparations for competing in the Central American and Caribbean Games in 2018. She also played one match with the national team in the 2018 Turkish Women's Cup in March 2018.

== Career statistics ==
=== Club ===
As of match played 27 August 2020

Appearances and goals by club, season and competition
Club	Season	League			Total	
Club	Season	Division	Apps	Goals	Apps	Goals
Guadalajara	2017–18	Liga MX Femenil	30	12	30	12
Guadalajara	2018–19	Liga MX Femenil	33	2	33	2
Guadalajara	2019–20	Liga MX Femenil	25	5	25	5
Guadalajara	2020–21	Liga MX Femenil	1	0	1	0
Guadalajara	Total		89	19	88	19
Career total			89	19	88	19

== Honours ==
=== Club ===
Guadalajara

- Liga MX Femenil: Apertura 2017
