= Zellyka Arce =

Mexican footballer (born 1997)

Personal information
- Full name: Zellyka Guadalupe Arce Balleza
- Date of birth: 28 July 1997 (age 29)
- Place of birth: Lagos de Moreno, Jalisco, Mexico
- Height: 1.63 m (5 ft 4 in)
- Position: Defensive midfielder

Team information
- Current team: Saprissa
- Number: 28

Senior career*
Years	Team	Apps	(Gls)
2017–2018	Guadalajara	14	(0)
2018–2023	Atlas	115	(6)
2023–2024	Atlético San Luis	33	(2)
2024–2025	Monterrey	26	(1)
2026–	Saprissa	0	(0)
- * Club domestic league appearances and goals

Zellyka Guadalupe Arce Balleza (Note: In this Spanish name, the first or paternal surname is Arce and the second or maternal family name is Balleza.) (born 28 July 1997), is a Mexican professional football midfielder who currently plays for Saprissa.

== Playing career ==
Arce played for Guadalajara during the inaugural season of the Mexican Liga MX Femenil, the first professional women's soccer league in Mexico. In 2017, she contributed to Chivas win the first professional women's football championship in the country in front of a record-setting 32,466 spectators.

She played for Atlético San Luis.

== Honours ==
Guadalajara

- Liga MX Femenil: Apertura 2017
