= Miriam Castillo =

Mexican footballer (born 1992)

Personal information
- Full name: Miriam Castillo Zárate
- Date of birth: 1 June 1992 (age 34)
- Place of birth: Acapulco, Guerrero, Mexico
- Height: 1.66 m (5 ft 5 in)
- Position: Defensive midfielder

Team information
- Current team: Juárez
- Number: 4

Senior career*
Years	Team	Apps	(Gls)
2018–2022	Guadalajara	108	(8)
2022–	Juárez	80	(3)
- * Club domestic league appearances and goals as of 4 June 2023 ‡ National team caps and goals as of 12 March 2022

Miriam Castillo Zárate (born 1 June 1992) is a Mexican professional footballer who plays as a Right-back for Liga MX Femenil side UNAM.

== Career ==
In 2018, she started her career in Guadalajara. In 2022, she was transferred to Juárez.
