= Valeria Meza =

Mexican footballer (born 1999)

Personal information
- Full name: Valeria Alejandra Meza Cárdenas
- Date of birth: 8 November 1999 (age 26)
- Place of birth: Zapopan, Jalisco Mexico
- Height: 1.60 m (5 ft 3 in)
- Position: Right-back

Senior career*
Years	Team	Apps	(Gls)
2017–2018	Guadalajara	16	(0)
2018–2021	Necaxa	77	(0)
2021	Juárez	14	(0)

International career
2017	Mexico U-20		
- * Club domestic league appearances and goals

Valeria Alejandra Meza Cárdenas (born 8 November 1999) is a Mexican professional footballer who currently plays as a defender for FC Juárez in Liga MX Femenil.

== Club career ==
=== C.F. Guadalajara ===
Meza began playing for Guadalajara during the inaugural season of Liga MX Femenil. In July 2017, she helped the team win the inaugural Tapatío Women's Classic. Later the same year, she helped Chivas win the Apertura 2017, the first ever Mexican professional women's soccer championship. Chivas won the second leg of the final in front of a record-breaking 32,466 spectators.

== International career ==
In 2017, Meza was called up to Mexico women's national under-20 football team.

== Honours ==
=== Club ===
Guadalajara

- Liga MX Femenil: Apertura 2017
