= Susan Bejarano =

Mexican footballer (born 1995)

Personal information
- Full name: Susan Yanet Bejarano Rodríguez
- Date of birth: 7 August 1995 (age 31)
- Place of birth: Colima, Colima, Mexico
- Height: 1.63 m (5 ft 4 in)
- Position: Defensive midfielder

Senior career*
Years	Team	Apps	(Gls)
2017–2023	Guadalajara	82	(2)
2023–2024	Atlas	14	(0)
- * Club domestic league appearances and goals

Susan Yanet Bejarano Rodríguez (born 7 August 1995), known as Susan Bejarano, is a Mexican professional football midfielder who played for Guadalajara of the Liga MX Femenil.

In December 2017, Bejarano was honored by the governor of Colima, José Ignacio Peralta.

== Honours ==
Guadalajara

- Liga MX Femenil: Apertura 2017
