= Karen Gómez =

Mexican footballer (born 1993)

Personal information
- Full name: Karen Gómez Espinoza
- Date of birth: June 10, 1993 (age 33)
- Place of birth: Guadalajara, Jalisco, Mexico
- Height: 1.68 m (5 ft 6 in)
- Position: Goalkeeper

Senior career*
Years	Team	Apps	(Gls)
2017–2018	Guadalajara	6	(0)
2019	Cruz Azul	5	(0)
2021	Querétaro	0	(0)
2022–2023	Querétaro	0	(0)

International career
2009–2010	Mexico U17		
2010–2011	Mexico U20		

Managerial career
- 2020–2021: Querétaro (Goalkeeping coach)
- 2022: Querétaro (Goalkeeping coach)
- * Club domestic league appearances and goals as of 18 October 2017

Karen Gómez Espinoza (born 10 June 1993) is a former Mexican professional footballer who played as a goalkeeper for Querétaro in the Liga MX Femenil. She has represented Mexico on the under-17 and under-20 national teams.

== Early life and education ==
Gómez attended Universidad Panamerica where she played on the soccer team and majored in industrial engineering.

== Playing career ==
=== Guadalajara, 2017–18 ===
Gómez started the inaugural season of the Liga MX Femenil as Guadalajara's starting goalkeeper, but suffered an injury to her arm in August and lost her starting spot. She returned to the squad in February 2018.

=== Cruz Azul, 2018–19 ===
In December 2018, Gómez signed with Cruz Azul.

== Honors ==
Guadalajara

- Liga MX Femenil: Apertura 2017
