= Victoria Acevedo =

Mexican footballer (born 1999)

Personal information
- Full name: Victoria Lizbeth Acevedo Ponce
- Date of birth: 16 January 1999 (age 27)
- Place of birth: Guadalajara, Jalisco, Mexico
- Height: 1.63 m (5 ft 4 in)
- Position: Defensive midfielder

Team information
- Current team: Atlas
- Number: 6

Senior career*
Years	Team	Apps	(Gls)
2017–2024	Guadalajara	85	(3)
2025–	Atlas	22	(1)
- * Club domestic league appearances and goals as of 6 February 2026

Victoria Lizbeth Acevedo Ponce (born 16 January 1999) is a Mexican professional football midfielder who currently plays for Guadalajara (also known as Chivas) of the Liga MX Femenil, the first professional women's football league in Mexico. In 2017, she helped Chivas advance to the final where they won the first professional women's football championship in the country in front of 32,466 spectators.

== Honours ==
Guadalajara

- Liga MX Femenil: Apertura 2017
