= Priscila Padilla =

Mexican footballer (born 1999)

Personal information
- Full name: Priscila Guadalupe Padilla Rentería
- Date of birth: 11 December 1999 (age 26)
- Place of birth: Tlaquepaque, Jalisco Mexico
- Height: 1.70 m (5 ft 7 in)
- Position: Centre-back

Senior career*
| Years | Team | Apps | (Gls) |
| 2017–2020 | Guadalajara | 51 | (4) |
| 2021–2022 | Tijuana | 18 | (0) |
| 2022–2023 | Santos Laguna | 37 | (0) |
- * Club domestic league appearances and goals

Priscila Guadalupe Padilla Rentería (born 12 December 1999), known as Priscila Padilla, is a Mexican professional footballer who plays as a defender. In 2017, she helped Chivas win the first professional women's football championship in the country in front of 32,466 spectators.

== Early life ==
Padilla began playing football as a child with her brother. While her mother did not want her to play, her father encouraged her passion for the game.

== Playing career ==
=== Guadalajara, 2017–2020 ===
Padilla began playing for Guadalajara during the inaugural season of Liga MX Femenil. After helping lead the team to the final, she noted that at the beginning of the season, few believed in them and now they were the main team of the tournament. The team went on to win the championship final which set a new record for attendance at a women's professional soccer game. In February 2018, she scored a goal during the team's 4–1 win over Santos Laguna.

== Honours ==
Guadalajara

- Liga MX Femenil: Apertura 2017
