= Perla Morones =

Mexican footballer (born 1991)

Personal information
- Full name: Perla Cristina Morones Monjaras
- Date of birth: 4 March 1991 (age 35)
- Place of birth: Manuel Doblado, Guanajuato, Mexico
- Height: 1.70 m (5 ft 7 in)
- Position: Forward

Senior career*
Years	Team	Apps	(Gls)
2017–2019	León	12	(8)
2019	Colo-Colo		(3)
2021	Suchitepéquez		(3)
- * Club domestic league appearances and goals as of 18 October 2017

Perla Cristina Morones Monjaras (born 4 March 1991) is a former Mexican professional footballer who last played for Guatemalan team C.D. Suchitepéquez.

== Career ==
In 2019, Morones joined Chilean club Colo-Colo.
