= Selene Valera =

Mexican footballer (born 1994)

Personal information
- Full name: Selene Itzel Valera Cortez
- Date of birth: 19 October 1994 (age 32)
- Place of birth: Colima City, Colima, Mexico
- Height: 1.66 m (5 ft 5 in)
- Position: Centre-back

Team information
- Current team: Atlante
- Number: 5

Senior career*
Years	Team	Apps	(Gls)
2017–2018	Guadalajara	4	(0)
2018–2019	León	31	(3)
2019–2022	América	49	(2)
2023	Atlas	10	(0)
2023–2024	UNAM	12	(0)
2025–2026	Pachuca	4	(0)
2026–	Atlante	0	(0)
- * Club domestic league appearances and goals as of 4 June 2023 ‡ National team caps and goals as of 12 March 2022

Selene Itzel Valera Cortez (born 19 October 1994) is a Mexican professional footballer who plays as a Right-back for Liga MX Femenil side UNAM.

== Career ==
In 2017, she started her career in Guadalajara. In 2018, she was transferred to León . In 2019, she joined to América. In 2023, she moved to Atlas. One season later, she got transferred to UNAM.
