= Blanca Félix =

Mexican footballer (born 1996)

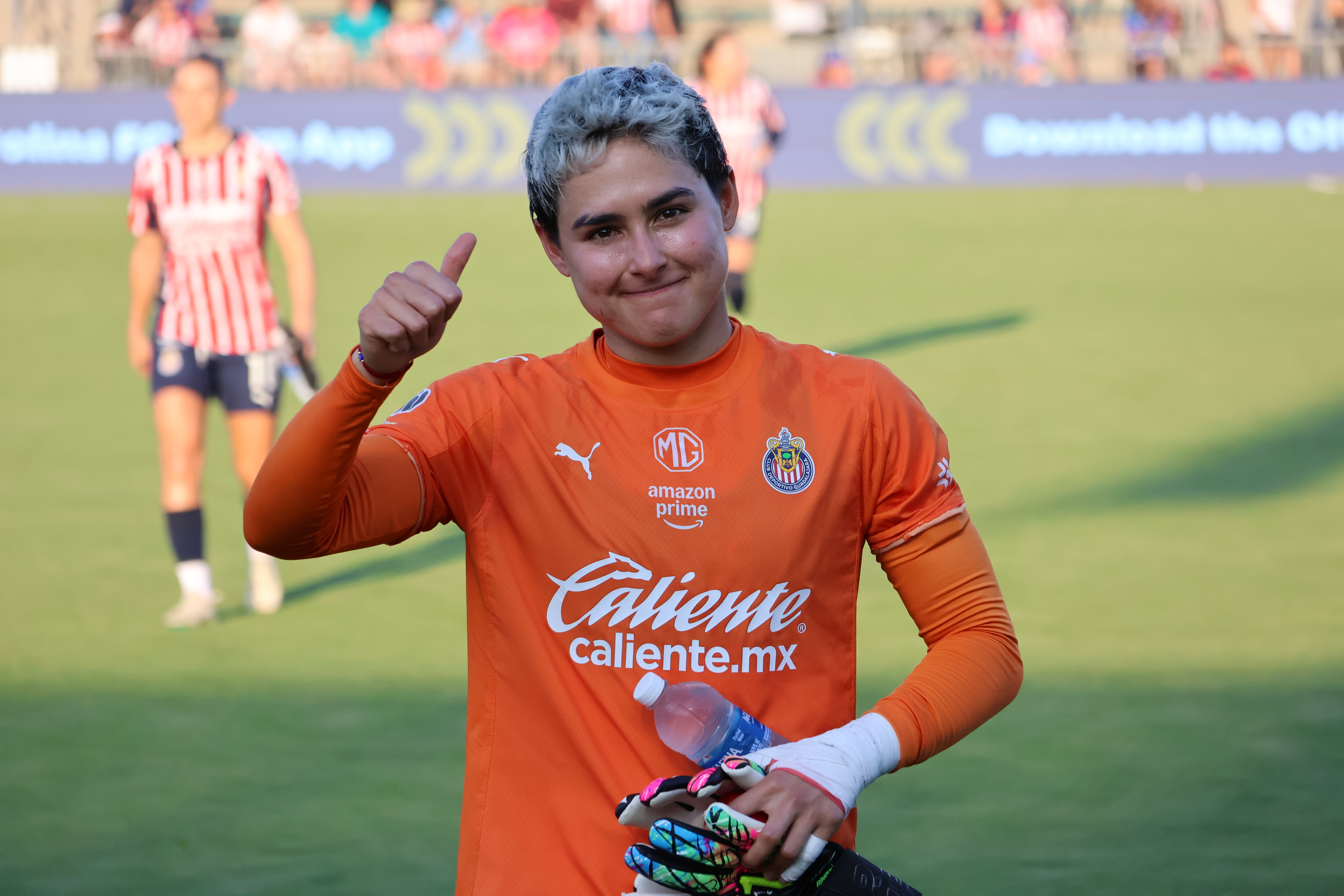
- Félix with Chivas in 2025

Personal information
- Full name: Blanca María Félix Castro
- Date of birth: 25 March 1996 (age 30)
- Place of birth: Angostura, Sinaloa, Mexico
- Height: 1.67 m (5 ft 6 in)
- Position: Goalkeeper

Team information
- Current team: Guadalajara
- Number: 12

Senior career*
Years	Team	Apps	(Gls)
2017–	Guadalajara	241	(0)

International career^{‡}
2024–	Mexico	3	(0)
- * Club domestic league appearances and goals as of 19 October 2025 ‡ National team caps and goals as of 19 October 2025

Blanca María Félix Castro (born 25 March 1996) is a Mexican professional footballer who plays as a goalkeeper for Liga MX Femenil club Guadalajara and the Mexico national team.

== Club career ==
Félix was one of the first three goalkeepers to ever play for Club Deportivo Guadalajara in the first Liga Femenil MX season. She started the tournament as the third goalkeeper following Karen Gómez and Ana Ruvalcaba as the first and second goalkeepers. Karen Gómez was then the starter goalkeeper until the second game when she suffered an injury and had to be replaced by Ana Rubalcaba in the 10' minute. For the next three games Ruvalcaba was Luis Camacho's first option and Blanca Félix was the substitute goalkeeper until September 3, when she made her debut against Club Santos Laguna in the matchday 6. Since then she became Guadalajara's starter goalkeeper and one of the fans favorite players.

After the Apertura 2017, Félix was named the best goalkeeper of the tournament, and was part of the Apertura 2017 Team of The Season.

== International ==
On 28 November 2017, Félix received her first call-up to the Mexico national team.

== Career statistics ==
=== Club ===
As of 19 January 2018.

Club statistics
Club	Season	League (Note: Includes Liguilla)			National Cup		Continental		Total	
Club	Season	Division	Apps	Goals	Apps	Goals	Apps	Goals	Apps	Goals
Guadalajara	2017–18	Liga MX Femenil	15	0	—		—		15	0
Guadalajara	Total		15	0	0	0	0	0	15	0
Career total			15	0	0	0	0	0	15	0

== Honours and achievements ==
Guadalajara

- Liga MX Femenil: Apertura 2017

Individual

- Liga MX Femenil Team of The Season: Apertura 2017
