= Jorge Macías =

Mexican footballer and manager (born 1984)

Personal information
- Full name: Jorge Macías Gurrola
- Date of birth: 5 July 1984 (age 42)
- Place of birth: Gómez Palacio, Durango, Mexico
- Position: Forward

Team information
- Current team: UANL U-15 (Assistant)

Youth career
- Santos Laguna

Senior career*
Years	Team	Apps	(Gls)
2007	Mérida	8	(0)

Managerial career
- 2008: Calor (Assistant)
- 2009–2010: Toros Laguna
- 2010–2011: Aztecas Arandas
- 2011–2015: FC Toros
- 2015–2017: Santos Laguna Reserves and Academy
- 2017–2019: Santos Laguna (women)
- 2020–2023: Santos Laguna Reserves and Academy
- 2026–: Tigres UANL Reserves and Academy
- * Club domestic league appearances and goals

Jorge Macías Gurrola (born July 5, 1984) is a Mexican football manager and former player.
