= Anette Vázquez =

Mexican footballer (born 2002)

Personal information
- Full name: Anette Natalia Vázquez Mendoza
- Date of birth: 11 March 2002 (age 24)
- Place of birth: Guadalajara, Jalisco, Mexico
- Height: 1.61 m (5 ft 3 in)
- Position: Winger

Senior career*
Years	Team	Apps	(Gls)
2017–2025	Guadalajara	91	(9)
2024–2025	→ Atlético San Luis (loan)	34	(1)
2025	Santos Laguna	8	(0)

International career
2017–2018	Mexico U17		
2019–2022	Mexico U20		
- * Club domestic league appearances and goals

Anette Natalia Vázquez Mendoza (born 11 March 2002), known as Anette Vázquez or her nickname, La Rata (the Rat), is a Mexican professional football midfielder. In 2017, she helped elevate Chivas to win the first professional women's football championship in the country in front of a record-setting 32,466 spectators. The team, with Vázquez as an important figure, won a league for a second time in the Torneo Clausura 2022 (Liga MX Femenil). As of 2018 Vázquez also plays for the Mexico women's national under-20 football team and was selected for the 2022 FIFA U-20 Women's World Cup, where she scored the only Mexican goal in the game against New Zealand.

== Playing career ==
=== Guadalajara, 2017–2024 ===
Vazquez began playing for Guadalajara during the inaugural season of Liga MX Femenil. Vasquez scored the first-ever goal for the team. In July 2017, she scored the game-winning goal and helped the team win the inaugural Tapatío Women's Classic 3–0.

== Honours ==
Guadalajara

- Liga MX Femenil: Apertura 2017
- Liga MX Femenil: Clausura 2022
