= Ana Gabriela Huerta =

Mexican footballer (born 1999)

Personal information
- Full name: Ana Gabriela Huerta Aguas
- Date of birth: 12 January 1999 (age 27)
- Place of birth: Zapopan, Jalisco, Mexico
- Height: 1.58 m (5 ft 2 in)
- Position: Winger

Senior career*
Years	Team	Apps	(Gls)
2017–2018	Necaxa	24	(6)
2018–2020	Guadalajara	30	(5)
2021–2023	Cruz Azul	60	(4)
2024–2025	Necaxa	30	(4)
2025–2026	Tijuana	3	(0)
- * Club domestic league appearances and goals as of 9 February 2026 ‡ National team caps and goals as of 12 March 2022

Ana Gabriela Huerta Aguas (born 12 January 1999) is a Mexican professional footballer who plays as a Winger for Liga MX Femenil side Necaxa.

== Career ==
In 2017, she started her career in Necaxa. In 2018, she transferred to Guadalajara. In 2021, she joined Cruz Azul. In 2024, she returned to Necaxa.
