= Luis Manuel Díaz =

Mexican football manager

Personal information
- Full name: Luis Manuel Díaz
- Date of birth: 17 May 1965 (age 61)
- Place of birth: Mexico City, Mexico
- Height: 1.82 m (6 ft 0 in)

Team information
- Current team: Guadalajara Juvenil (assistant)

Youth career
- 1980–1984: Guadalajara (youth)

Senior career*
Years	Team	Apps	(Gls)
1984–1990	Guadalajara	245	(3)

Managerial career
- 2005–2006: Guadalajara Premier
- 2006–2008: Guadalajara (assistant)
- 2008–2009: Chivas USA (assistant)
- 2009: Tapatío (assistant)
- 2010: Tecos (assistant)
- 2011–2014: Morelia Juvenil
- 2014: Atlas Juvenil
- 2018: Oro (assistant)
- 2019: Guadalajara (women)
- 2021–: Guadalajara Juvenil (assistant)
- * Club domestic league appearances and goals

Luis Manuel Díaz (born 17 May 1965) is a Mexican football assistant manager and former player who is the assistant for Guadalajara Juvenil since 2021.

== Youth career ==
In 1975, Díaz debuted with Guadalajara Pequeños.

In 1977, Díaz debuted with Guadalajara Infantil B and Guadalajara Infantil A.

In 1980, Díaz debuted with Guadalajara Juvenil.

== Club career ==
Born in Mexico City, Díaz played for Guadalajara and debuted in a friendly match vs the Mexico national team. Díaz played his first international game for Guadalajara in a game vs Águila in the 1984 CONCACAF Champions' Cup and scored a goal.

On 10 February 1980, Díaz played his last game for Guadalajara vs Puebla. In the final part of the season he was sold to Monterrey eventually he went back with the team but he had a muscle injury.

In 1991, Carlos Miloc suggested Díaz to América and was bought but he didn't have any playing time and he was transferred in March 1992.

== Coaching career ==
In 2005, Díaz became the manager for Guadalajara Premier.

In 2011, Díaz was named the coach for Morelia Juvenil.

In 2014, Díaz was named the head coach for Atlas Juvenil.

In 2019, Díaz as appointed as manager for Guadalajara Femenil.

== Honours ==
=== Player ===
Guadalajara

- Primera División: 1986–87

=== Manager ===
Guadalajara (as assistant manager)

- Liga MX: Apertura 2006
