= Araceli Torres =

Mexican footballer (born 2000)

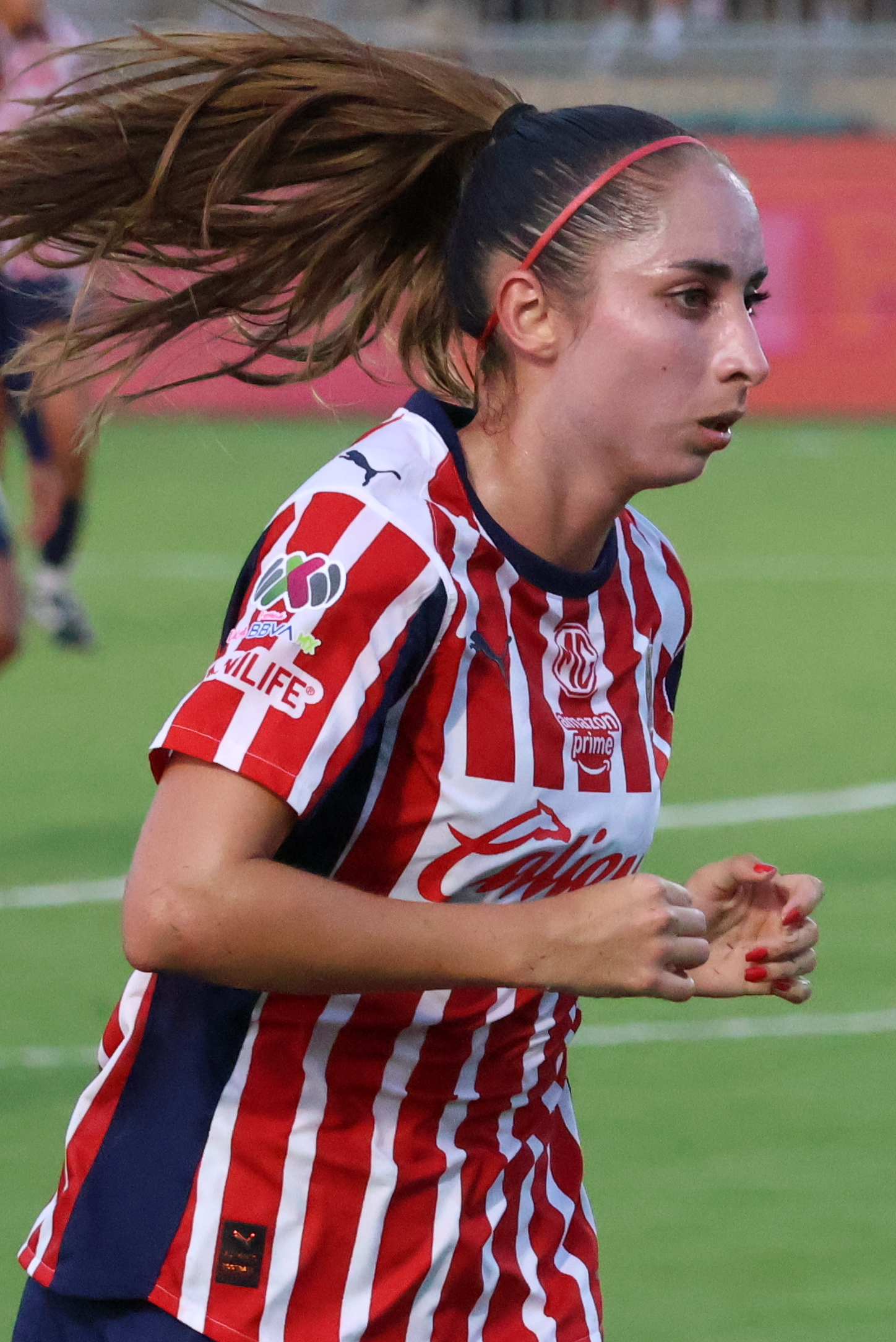
- Torres with Guadalajara in 2025

Personal information
- Full name: Angélica Araceli Torres Muñoz
- Date of birth: 23 December 2000 (age 25)
- Place of birth: Guadalajara, Jalisco, Mexico
- Height: 1.54 m (5 ft 1 in)
- Position: Right back

Team information
- Current team: Cruz Azul (on loan from Guadalajara)
- Number: 26

Senior career*
Years	Team	Apps	(Gls)
2018–	Guadalajara	196	(4)
2026–	→ Cruz Azul (loan)	5	(0)

International career^{‡}
2023–	Mexico	11	(0)
Medal record
Women's football
Representing Mexico
Pan American Games
Gold medal – first place	2023 Santiago	Team
- * Club domestic league appearances and goals as of 1 February 2026 ‡ National team caps and goals as of 20 February 2025

Angélica Araceli Torres Muñoz (born 23 December 2000) is a Mexican professional footballer who plays as a right-back for Liga Femenil club Cruz Azul, on loan from Guadalajara, and the Mexico national team.

== Club career ==
In 2018, Torres started her career in Guadalajara, where she won a championship. Due to her good performances, she was called to the Mexico national team.

== International career ==
Torres made her debut for the Mexico women's national team on 26 September 2023 in a 2024 CONCACAF W Gold Cup qualification game against Trinidad and Tobago.

Torres was selected to represent Mexico at the 2023 Pan American Games held in Santiago, Chile, where the Mexican squad went undefeated to won the gold medal for the first time in their history at the Pan American Games, defeating Chile 1–0.

== Honours ==
Mexico

- Pan American Games: 2023, gold medal

Guadalajara

- Liga MX Femenil: Clausura 2022
