= Andrea Sánchez (footballer) =

Mexican footballer (born 1994)

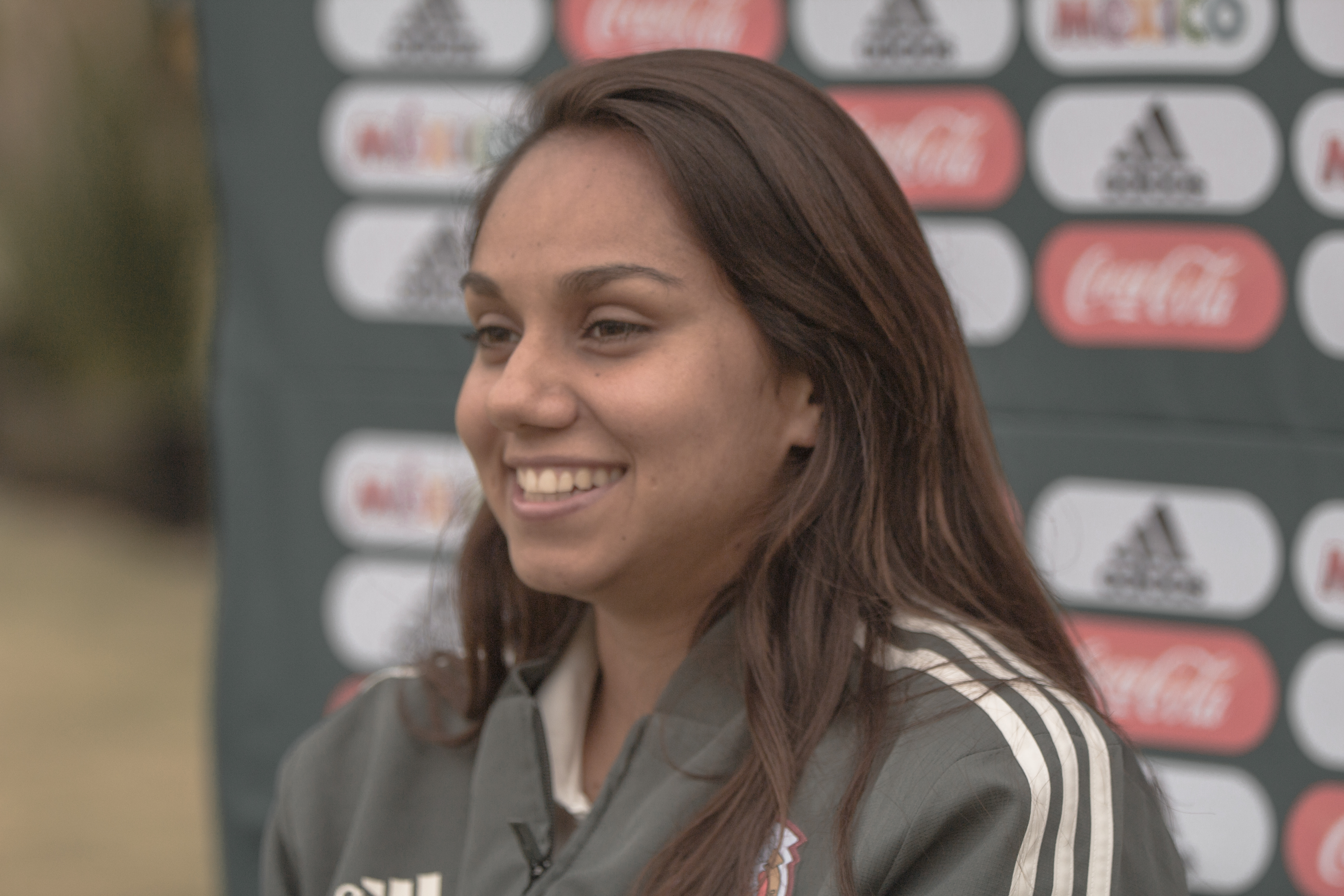

Personal information
- Full name: María Andrea Sánchez Piñón
- Date of birth: 31 March 1994 (age 32)
- Place of birth: Ocotlán, Jalisco, Mexico
- Height: 1.60 m (5 ft 3 in)
- Position: Right back

Senior career*
Years	Team	Apps	(Gls)
2017–2020	Guadalajara	91	(5)
2021–2022	Monterrey	30	(0)
2022	Cruz Azul	15	(2)
2023–2025	Juárez	28	(1)
2025	León	8	(0)

International career
2009–2010	Mexico U17		
2010–2011	Mexico U20		
2020–	Mexico	6	(0)
- * Club domestic league appearances and goals as of 6 August 2020

María Andrea Sánchez Piñón (born 31 March 1994) is a Mexican professional footballer who plays as a defender.

== Honours ==
Guadalajara

- Liga MX Femenil: Apertura 2017
