= Norma Palafox =

Mexican footballer (born 1998)

Personal information
- Full name: Norma Luz Irene Duarte Palafox
- Date of birth: 14 October 1998 (age 28)
- Place of birth: Huatabampo, Sonora, Mexico
- Height: 1.69 m (5 ft 7 in)
- Position: Winger

Team information
- Current team: Juárez
- Number: 7

Senior career*
Years	Team	Apps	(Gls)
2017–2020	Guadalajara	80	(18)
2021–2022	Pachuca	13	(0)
2022	Atlas	17	(2)
2023	Cruz Azul	34	(3)
2024–	Juárez	7	(1)

International career
2017–2018	Mexico U20		
- * Club domestic league appearances and goals as of March 2024

Norma Luz Irene Duarte Palafox (born 14 October 1998), known as Norma Duarte or Norma Palafox, is a Mexican professional footballer who plays as a forward for Liga MX Femenil club Juárez.

== Club career ==
=== Guadalajara ===
On 3 May 2017, Palafox made her debut for Guadalajara in a 6–1 loss to Pachuca in the Copa MX Femenil. On 29 July, she made her first Liga MX Femenil appearance in a 3–0 home victory against Atlas. On 3 September, she scored her first goal in a 6–0 win over Santos Laguna. In the first leg of the 2017 Apertura final on 20 November, Guadalajara were beaten 2–0 by Pachuca, but two goals from Arlett Tovar and one from Palafox helped them win 3–0 the second leg on 24 November, and consequently the first ever Liga MX Femenil title. Palafox finished the 2017 Apertura with 8 goals in 18 total appearances. She left the team shortly to participate in a reality show Upon finishing she returned to the team signing a new contract. In 2021 she left the team to play in Telemundo's Exatlon United States.

=== Pachuca ===
On 20 December 2020, Palafox was transferred to Pachuca.

=== Atlas ===
On 21 June 2022, Palafox was signed by Atlas.

== International career ==
=== Youth national teams ===
On 27 November 2017, Palafox received her first call-up to the under-20 national team. She was part of the team that won the 2018 CONCACAF Women's U-20 Championship. She made one appearance in the tournament in a 2–1 loss to the United States on 23 January 2018.

== Career statistics ==
=== Club ===
As of 6 March 2018.

Club	League	Season	League		Cup		Continental		Total	
Club	League	Season	Apps	Goals	Apps	Goals	Apps	Goals	Apps	Goals
Guadalajara	Liga MX Femenil	2017–18	24	9	3	0	—		27	9
Total			24	9	3	0	0	0	27	9
Career total			24	9	3	0	0	0	27	9

== Honors and awards ==
Guadalajara

- Liga MX Femenil: Apertura 2017

Individual

- Liga MX Femenil Team of The Season: Apertura 2017

Mexico U20

- CONCACAF Women's U-20 Championship: 2018

== Personal life ==
Palafox hails from Huatabampo, Sonora.
