= Vanessa Sánchez =

Mexican footballer (born 1995)

Personal information
- Full name: Guadalupe Vanessa Sánchez López
- Date of birth: 14 March 1995 (age 31)
- Place of birth: Guadalajara, Jalisco, Mexico
- Height: 1.66 m (5 ft 5 in)
- Position: Centre-back

Team information
- Current team: Atlante
- Number: 4

Senior career*
Years	Team	Apps	(Gls)
2017–2019	Guadalajara	56	(0)
2020	León	23	(0)
2021–2022	Tijuana	61	(0)
2023–2024	Pachuca	10	(0)
2025	Atlas	17	(0)
2026	Mazatlán	7	(1)
2026–	Atlante	0	(0)
- * Club domestic league appearances and goals as of 9 February 2026 ‡ National team caps and goals as of 12 March 2022

Guadalupe Vanessa Sánchez López (born 14 March 1995) is a Mexican professional footballer who plays as a Centre-back for Liga MX Femenil side Atlante F.C..

== Career ==
In 2017, she started her career in Guadalajara. In 2020, she was transferred to León . In 2021, she joined to Tijuana. In 2023, she joined to Pachuca.
