= Daniela Carrandi =

Mexican footballer (born 2000)

Personal information
- Full name: Daniela Carrandi Casillas
- Date of birth: 15 February 2000 (age 26)
- Place of birth: Miguel Hidalgo, DF, Mexico
- Height: 1.64 m (5 ft 5 in)
- Position: Winger

Team information
- Current team: Tijuana
- Number: 20

Senior career*
Years	Team	Apps	(Gls)
2017–2018	Guadalajara	21	(2)
2019–2023	Atlético San Luis	82	(14)
2024	Tijuana	23	(0)
2025	Querétaro	33	(2)
2026–	Tijuana	0	(0)
- * Club domestic league appearances and goals as of 25 May 2021

Daniela Carrandi Casillas (Note: In this Spanish name, the first or paternal surname is Carrandi and the second or maternal family name is Casillas.) (born 15 February 2000), known as Daniela Carrandi, is a Mexican professional football forward who currently plays for Liga MX Femenil club Tijuana.

== Playing career ==
=== C.D. Guadalajara ===
In 2017, Carrandi helped Chivas win the first professional women's football championship in the country in front of 32,466 spectators.

Carrandi scored in the 2017 Liguilla – Apertura semifinal round in the 92nd minute.
