= Miriam García =

Mexican footballer (born 1998)

Personal information
- Full name: Miriam Vanessa García Muñoz
- Date of birth: 14 February 1998 (age 28)
- Place of birth: Guadalajara, Jalisco, Mexico
- Height: 1.68 m (5 ft 6 in)
- Position: Centre-back

Senior career*
Years	Team	Apps	(Gls)
2017–2021	Guadalajara	77	(6)
2021–2022	Tigres UANL	11	(0)
2023	Juárez	6	(0)
2024	Pachuca	3	(0)
2024	León	3	(0)
2025–2026	Puebla	21	(1)

International career
2014–2015	Mexico U17		
2015–2018	Mexico U20		
2021–	Mexico	0	(0)
- * Club domestic league appearances and goals as of 2 February 2026

Miriam Vanessa García Muñoz (born 14 February 1998), known as Miriam García, is a Mexican professional football midfielder who currently plays for Pachuca of the Liga MX Femenil, the first professional women's football league in Mexico. In 2017, she helped Chivas win the first professional women's football championship in the country in front of 32,466 spectators.

García represented Mexico on the under-20 national team and helped the team win the 2018 CONCACAF Women's U-20 Championship. She was subsequently named Most Valuable Player (MVP) of the tournament.

== Playing career ==
=== Club ===
==== Guadalajara, 2017–2021 ====
García began playing for Guadalajara during the inaugural season of Liga MX Femenil.

=== International ===
García has represented Mexico on the under-17 and under-20 national teams. In January 2018, she was named the winner of the Golden Ball (best player) award at the CONCACAF Women's U-20 Championship. She played every minute of every match for Mexico's winning team.

== Honors and awards ==
=== Club ===
Guadalajara

- Liga MX Femenil: Apertura 2017

Individual

- Liga MX Femenil Team of The Season: Apertura 2017

=== International ===
Mexico U17

- CONCACAF Women's U-17 Championship: 2013

Mexico U20

- CONCACAF Women's U-20 Championship: 2018
- 2018 CONCACAF Women's U-20 Championship Golden Ball award
