= Nicole Pérez =

Mexican footballer (born 2001)

Personal information
- Full name: Dania Nicole Pérez Jiménez
- Date of birth: 30 August 2001 (age 25)
- Place of birth: Guadalajara, Jalisco, Mexico
- Height: 1.60 m (5 ft 3 in)
- Position: Attacking midfielder

Team information
- Current team: Monterrey
- Number: 10

Senior career*
Years	Team	Apps	(Gls)
2018–2020	Guadalajara	73	(18)
2021–	Monterrey	122	(20)

International career^{‡}
2017–2018	Mexico U17		
2019–2020	Mexico U20		
2021–	Mexico	14	(4)
Medal record
Women's football
Representing Mexico
Central American and Caribbean Games
Gold medal – first place	2026 Santo Domingo	Team
- * Club domestic league appearances and goals as of 1 February 2026 ‡ National team caps and goals as of 20 February 2025

Dania Nicole Pérez Jiménez (born 30 August 2001) is a Mexican professional football midfielder who currently plays for Monterrey of the Liga MX Femenil.

== Career ==
A native of Guadalajara, Pérez trained for gymnastics in her home town as a child. She began playing youth football at her school in Guadalajara, Mexico, and had a spell with RCD Espanyol Femenino youth team in 2017.

Pérez returned to Mexico where she played for Chivas Femenil in Liga MX Femenil, scoring 3 goals in 10 matches during the 2018–19 Apertura tournament. She followed that with five goals in 15 matches during the Clausura tournament. In October 2019, made her 50th Liga MX Femenil appearance for Chivas.

In December 2020, Pérez joined Monterrey.

== International career ==
=== Mexico U-17 women's national football team ===
On 12 June 2018, Mexico U-17 women's national football team finished as Runners-up at the 2018 CONCACAF Women's U-17 Championship.

On 1 December 2018, Mexico U-17 women's national football team finished as Runners-up at the 2018 FIFA U-17 Women's World Cup. Pérez won the Silver Ball as the tournament's second-best player of the competicion.

=== Mexico U-20 women's national football team ===
On 8 March 2020, Mexico U-20 women's national football team finished as Runners-up at the 2020 CONCACAF Women's U-20 Championship.

== International goals ==
No.	Date	Venue	Opponent	Score	Result	Competition
1.	26 October 2024	Estadio Agustín "Coruco" Díaz, Zacatepec, Mexico	Venezuela	2–0	3–0	Friendly
2.	26 October 2024	Estadio Agustín "Coruco" Díaz, Zacatepec, Mexico	Venezuela	3–0	3–0	Friendly
3.	30 November 2024	Estadio Andrés Quintana Roo, Cancún, Mexico	Costa Rica	4–1	4–1	Friendly
4.	3 December 2024	Estadio Carlos Iturralde, Mérida, Mexico	Panama	1–0	1–1	Friendly

== Honours ==
Mexico U-17

- CONCACAF Women's U-17 Championship: Runners-up: 2018
- FIFA U-17 Women's World Cup: Runners-up: 2018

Mexico U-20

- CONCACAF Women's U-20 Championship: Runners-up: 2020

Mexico U23

- Central American and Caribbean Gold Medal: 2026

== Personal ==
Nike, Inc. selected Pérez to be part of its Dream Crazier advertising campaign in 2019.
