= Lizbeth Ángeles =

Mexican footballer (born 1990)

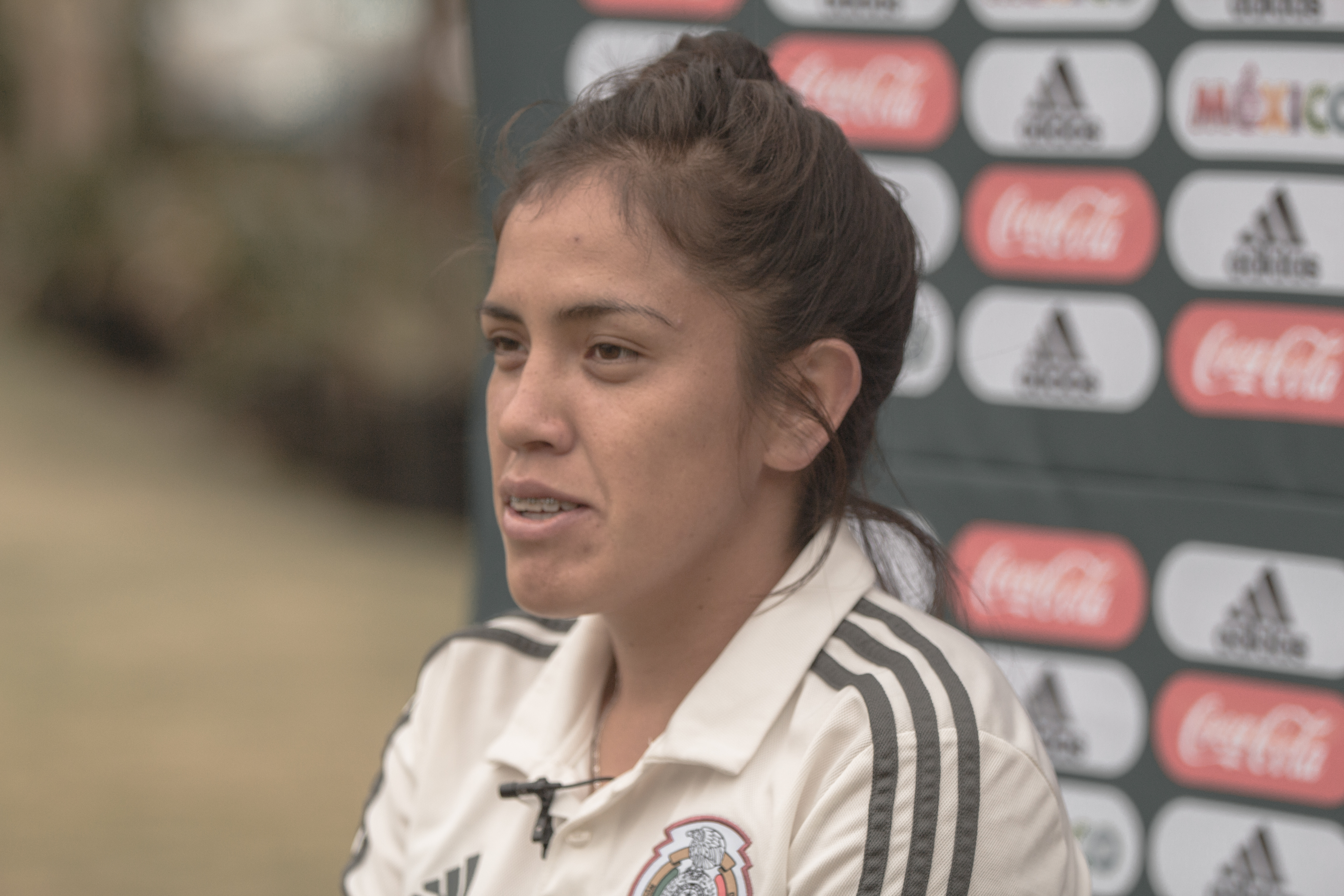

Personal information
- Full name: Lizbeth Ángeles Mercado
- Date of birth: 29 June 1990 (age 36)
- Place of birth: Mexico City, Mexico
- Height: 1.58 m (5 ft 2 in)
- Position: Winger

Team information
- Current team: Cruz Azul
- Number: 7

Senior career*
Years	Team	Apps	(Gls)
2017–2023	Pachuca	209	(50)
2023–2024	León	51	(9)
2025–	Cruz Azul	35	(8)
- * Club domestic league appearances and goals as of 1 February 2026

Lizbeth Ángeles Mercado (born 29 June 1990) is a Mexican professional footballer who plays as a midfielder for Liga Femenil club Cruz Azul.

Prior to turning professional, Ángeles captained Mexico's team at the 2015 edition of the Homeless World Cup. She later worked for the Federal Police before she joined Pachuca in 2017.
