= Brenda Viramontes =

Mexican footballer (born 1995)

Personal information
- Full name: Brenda Noemi Viramontes Ávalos
- Date of birth: 24 April 1995 (age 31)
- Place of birth: Guadalajara, Jalisco, Mexico
- Height: 1.61 m (5 ft 3 in)
- Position: Forward

Senior career*
| Years | Team | Apps | (Gls) |
| 2017–2019 | Guadalajara | 64 | (18) |
| 2020 | UANL | 2 | (0) |
| 2020 | León | 13 | (2) |
| 2021 | Querétaro | 32 | (2) |
- * Club domestic league appearances and goals

Brenda Noemi Viramontes Ávalos (Note: In this Spanish name, the first or paternal surname is Viramontes and the second or maternal family name is Ávalos.) (born 24 April 1995), known as Brenda Viramontes, is a former Mexican professional football midfielder. In 2017, she helped elevate Chivas to win the first professional women's soccer championship in the country in front of a record-setting 32,466 spectators.

== Playing career ==
=== Guadalajara, 2017 ===
Viramontes began playing for Guadalajara during the inaugural season of Liga MX Femenil. She scored 7 goals in 14 games.

== Honours ==
=== Club ===
Guadalajara

- Liga MX Femenil: Apertura 2017
