= Lucila Venegas =

Mexican football referee

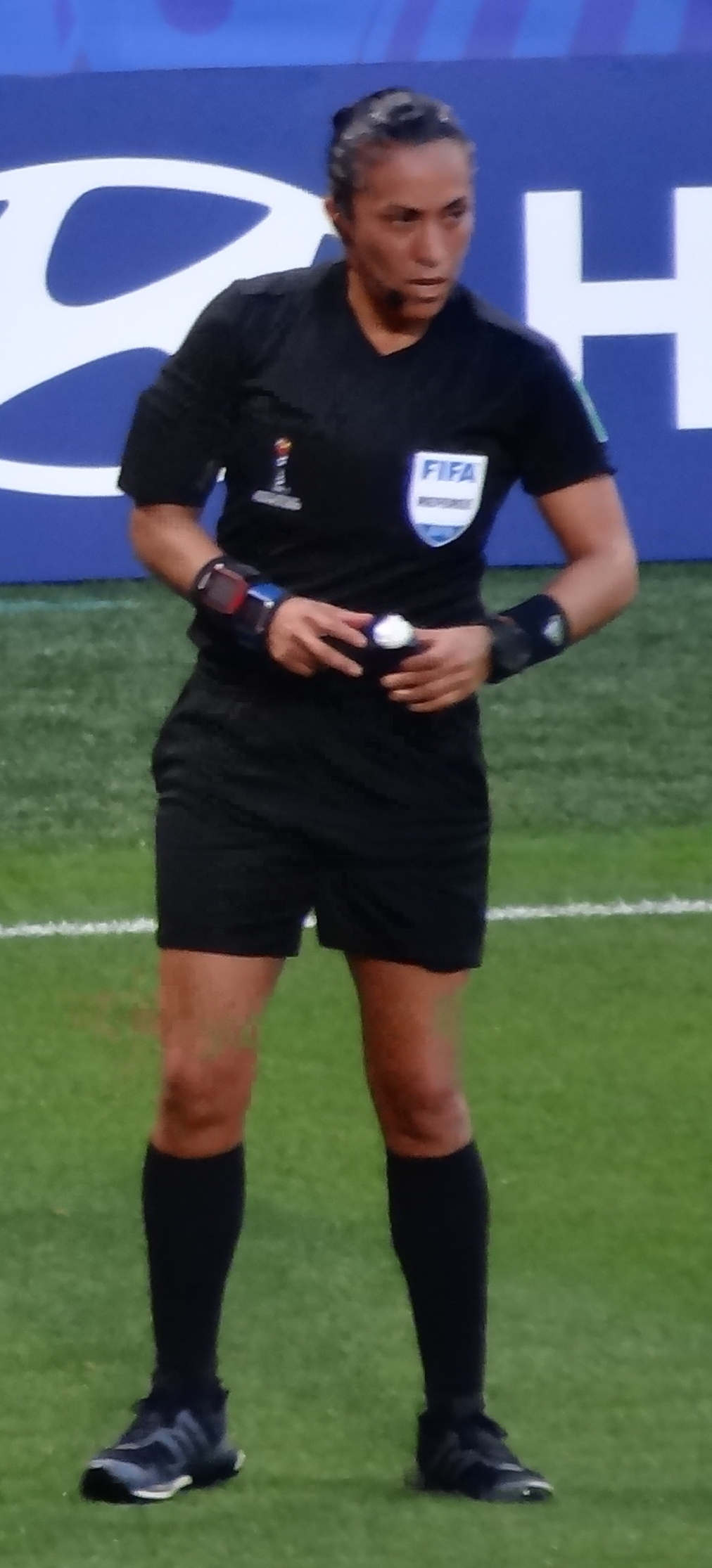
- Full name: Lucila Venegas Montes
- Born: 23 April 1981 (age 45); Guadalajara, Mexico

International
Years	League	Role
2008–	FIFA listed	Referee

Lucila Venegas Montes (born 23 April 1981) is an international football referee from Mexico.

Venegas became a FIFA listed referee in 2008.

She is an official at the 2019 FIFA Women's World Cup in France.

In October 2020, she won the National Sports Award (Premio Nacional de Deportes) in Mexico.
