= Marcela Valera =

Mexican footballer (born 1987)

- Valera in 2021

Personal information
- Full name: Marcela Valera Ceballos
- Date of birth: April 12, 1987 (age 39)
- Place of birth: Guadalajara, Jalisco, Mexico
- Height: 1.75 m (5 ft 9 in)
- Position: Centre back

Team information
- Current team: Alianza

Senior career*
Years	Team	Apps	(Gls)
2017–2018	Atlas	24	(5)
2018–2020	América	37	(1)
2021–2022	Santos Laguna	45	(2)
2022–2023	León	12	(0)
2024–	Alianza		

International career^{‡}
2017	Mexico	1	(0)
- * Club domestic league appearances and goals as of 26 March 2018 ‡ National team caps and goals as of 23 October 2017

Marcela Valera Ceballos (born 12 April 1987) is a Mexican professional footballer who plays as a central defender for the Mexico women's national team.

== Club career ==
Valera played previously for Atlas, where she served as their captain.

== International career ==
Valera made her senior international debut for Mexico on 23 October 2017.
