= Arlett Tovar =

Mexican footballer (born 1997)

- Tovar in 2019

Personal information
- Full name: Arlett Tovar Gómez
- Date of birth: 9 May 1997 (age 29)
- Place of birth: Guadalajara, Jalisco, Mexico
- Height: 1.66 m (5 ft 5 in)
- Position: Centre-back

Senior career*
Years	Team	Apps	(Gls)
2017–2019	Guadalajara	56	(14)
2019–2020	Santos Laguna	25	(6)
2020–2022	Toluca	58	(7)
2022–2023	Atlas	25	(0)
2023–2024	Santos Laguna	28	(0)

International career
2013–2014	Mexico U-17		
2015–2016	Mexico U-20		
- * Club domestic league appearances and goals as of 18 October 2017

Arlett Tovar Gómez (Note: In this Spanish name, the first or paternal surname is Tovar and the second or maternal family name is Gómez.) (born 9 May 1997), known as Arlett Tovar, is a Mexican professional footballer who plays as a defender for Santos Laguna in the Liga MX Femenil, the first professional women's football (soccer) league in Mexico.

In 2017, she scored two goals (a brace) in the final to help Chivas win the first professional women's soccer championship in the country in front of 32,466 spectators. Tovar has represented Mexico on the under-17 and under-20 national teams.

== Club career ==
Tovar scored a header goal in the 36th minute of the final game of the championship final to help Chivas win 3–0 over Pachuca. She and her teammates were honored by the Governor of Jalisco the following month. The President of Mexico congratulated the team via Twitter.

== International career ==
Tovar has represented Mexico on the under-17 national team. She competed at the 2013 CONCACAF Women's U-17 Championship held in Jamaica and helped the team finish in first place after defeating the United States in penalty kicks. Tovar scored one of the penalties. With the win, Mexico secured their placement at the 2014 FIFA U-17 Women's World Cup.

== Honors and achievements ==
Guadalajara

- Liga MX Femenil: Apertura 2017

Individual

- Liga MX Femenil Team of The Season: Apertura 2017
