= Luis Camacho (footballer) =

Mexican footballer and manager (born 1983)

Personal information
- Full name: Luis Fernando Camacho Haro
- Date of birth: 11 January 1983 (age 43)
- Place of birth: Zapopan, Jalisco, Mexico
- Height: 1.66 m (5 ft 5 in)
- Position: Midfielder

Youth career
- Guadalajara

Senior career*
Years	Team	Apps	(Gls)
2003–2004	Tapatío	7	(0)
2004	Chivas La Piedad	10	(0)
2004	Guadalajara	2	(0)
2005	Chivas La Piedad	11	(1)
2005–2006	Delfines de Coatzacoalcos	21	(3)
2006	Guerreros de Tabasco	3	(0)
2007	Tijuana	10	(0)

Managerial career
- 2014: Atotonilco F.C. (Assistant)
- 2015–2017: Real San Cosme
- 2017–2018: Guadalajara (Women)
- 2021: Guadalajara Reserves and Academy
- * Club domestic league appearances and goals

Luis Fernando Camacho Haro (born January 11, 1983), is a Mexican former footballer and current manager.
