= 2017–18 Liga MX Femenil season =

Liga MX Femenil
- Season: 2017–18
- Champions: Apertura: Guadalajara (1st title); Clausura: UANL (1st title)
- Matches: 224
- Goals: 737 (3.29 per match)
- Top goalscorer: Apertura: Lucero Cuevas (15 goals); Clausura: Lucero Cuevas (15 goals)
- Biggest home win: Apertura: UANL 9–0 León (August 19, 2017); Clausura: Monterrey 8–0 Necaxa (January 28, 2018)
- Biggest away win: Apertura: Cruz Azul 1–9 Pachuca (August 19, 2017); Clausura: Morelia 1–12 América (April 2, 2018)
- Highest scoring: Apertura: Cruz Azul 1–9 Pachuca (August 19, 2017); Clausura: Morelia 1–12 América (April 2, 2018)

The 2017–18 Liga MX Femenil season was the inaugural season of the top-flight women's football league in Mexico. The season is contested by sixteen teams, being the counterpart women's teams of the men's league, Liga MX. Of the 18 Liga MX clubs, Puebla and Lobos BUAP were the two teams who do not field a women's team.

== Format ==
The Liga MX Femenil season is split into two championships: the Torneo Apertura (or opening tournament) and the Torneo Clausura (or closing tournament). Each in contested in an identical format and includes the same sixteen teams. The Apertura started on July 29, 2017 and ended in November 2017 while the Clausura (or closing tournament) runs from January 5-May 5, 2018.

== Teams, stadiums, and personnel ==
The following sixteen teams are competing this season. Of the 18 Liga MX clubs, Puebla and Lobos BUAP are the two teams who do not field a women's team.

=== Stadiums and locations ===
América	Atlas	Cruz Azul	Guadalajara
Estadio Azteca	Estadio Jalisco	Estadio Azul	Estadio Akron
Capacity: 81,070	Capacity: 55,110	Capacity: 33,000	Capacity: 46,232
	Barra 51		
León	Monterrey	Morelia	Necaxa
Estadio León	Estadio BBVA Bancomer	Estadio Morelos	Estadio Victoria
Capacity: 31,297	Capacity: 51,348	Capacity: 34,795	Capacity: 23,851
Pachuca	Querétaro	Santos Laguna	Tijuana
Estadio Hidalgo	Estadio Corregidora	Estadio Corona	Estadio Caliente
Capacity: 27,512	Capacity: 33,162	Capacity: 29,237	Capacity: 27,333
			|
Toluca	UANL	UNAM	Veracruz
Estadio Nemesio Díez	Estadio Universitario	La Cantera	Estadio Luis "Pirata" Fuente
Capacity: 31,000	Capacity: 41,886	Capacity: 2,000	Capacity: 28,703

Locations of clubs for the 2016–17 Liga MX season

=== Personnel and kits ===
Team	Chairman	Head coach	Captain	Kit manufacturer	Shirt sponsor(s)
América	Santiago Baños	(Mexico) Leonardo Cuéllar	(Mexico) Cecilia Santiago	Nike	Huawei
Atlas	Gustavo Guzmán	(Mexico) Susana Gutiérrez	(Mexico) Marcela Valera	Adidas	ECOFIN
Cruz Azul	Guillermo Álvarez Cuevas	(Mexico) Alberto Aguilar	(Mexico) Reyna Velázquez	Azul Sport	Cemento Cruz Azul
Guadalajara	Jorge Vergara	(Mexico) Luis Camacho	(Mexico) Tania Morales	Puma	Sello Rojo
León	Jesús Martínez Murguia	(Mexico) José Guadalupe Mota	(Mexico) Leticia Vázquez	Pirma	Cementos Fortaleza
Monterrey	Duilio Davino	(Mexico) Héctor Becerra	(Mexico) Rebeca Bernal	Puma	AT&T
Morelia	Álvaro Dávila	(Mexico) Verónica Hernández	(Mexico) Isamar Toledo	Pirma	Kansas City Southern de México
Necaxa	Ernesto Tinajero Flores	(Mexico) Miguel Acosta	(Mexico) Lucía Muñoz	Charly	Rolcar
Pachuca	Jesús Martínez Patiño	(Mexico) Eva Espejo	(Mexico) Mónica Ocampo	Nike	Cementos Fortaleza
Querétaro	Jaime Ordiales	(Mexico) Marco Zamora	(Mexico) Verónica Pérez	Puma	Banco Multiva
Santos Laguna	Alejandro Irarragorri	(Mexico) Jorge Macías	(Mexico) Diana Sánchez	Puma	Soriana
Tijuana	Jorge Hank Inzunsa	(Mexico) Andrea Rodebaugh	(Mexico) Patricia Gutiérrez	Charly	Caliente
Toluca	Francisco Suinaga	(Mexico) Juan Carlos Mendoza	(Mexico) Dirce Delgado	Under Armour	Banamex
UANL	Alejandro Rodríguez Michelsen	(Argentina) Osvaldo Batocletti	(Mexico) Liliana Mercado	Adidas	Cemex
UNAM	Rodrigo Ares de Parga	(Mexico) Ileana Dávila	(Mexico) Deneva Cagigas	Nike	DHL Express
Veracruz	Fidel Kuri Mustieles	(Mexico) Rodolfo Vega	(Mexico) Zitlalli Gazga	Charly	Winpot

=== Managerial changes ===
Team	Outgoing manager	Manner of departure	Date of vacancy	Replaced by	Date of appointment	Position in table
Apertura changes
Veracruz	(Mexico) Melissa Núñez	Sacked	September 8, 2017	(Mexico) Rodolfo Vega	September 11, 2017	16th
Monterrey	(Mexico) Gustavo Leal	Resigned	October 12, 2017	(Mexico) Eliud Contreras (Interim)	October 12, 2017	3rd
Pre-Clausura changes
Cruz Azul	(Argentina) Pablo Bocco	Sacked	November 10, 2017	(Mexico) Alberto Aguilar	November 10, 2017	Preseason
Santos Laguna	(Mexico) Armando Pedroza	Sacked	November 27, 2017	(Mexico) Jorge Macías	November 27, 2017	Preseason
Monterrey	(Mexico) Eliud Contreras (Interim)	End of tenure as caretaker	December 4, 2017	(Mexico) Héctor Becerra	December 4, 2017	Preseason
Necaxa	(Mexico) Miguel Ramírez	Mutual agreement	December 23, 2017	(Mexico) Miguel Acosta	December 23, 2017	Preseason
Atlas	(Mexico) Jorge Rodríguez	Sacked	January 8, 2018	(Mexico) Susana Gutiérrez	January 8, 2018	Preseason

== Format ==
The teams will be divided into two groups of eight, where the best two of each group will advance to the semifinals of the Liguilla.

== Torneo Apertura ==
=== Regular season ===
==== Standings ====
===== Table =====
Pos	Team	Pld	W	D	L	GF	GA	GD	Pts	Qualification or relegation
1	América	14	11	2	1	48	11	+37	35	Advance to Liguilla (Note: The two best teams of each group advance to the semifinals of the Liguilla.)
2	UANL	14	11	1	2	51	7	+44	34	Advance to Liguilla
3	Guadalajara (C)	14	11	1	2	33	10	+23	34	Advance to Liguilla
4	Monterrey	14	10	1	3	38	17	+21	31	
5	Pachuca	14	9	3	2	36	16	+20	30	Advance to Liguilla
6	Toluca	14	8	2	4	26	16	+10	26	
7	UNAM	14	5	6	3	24	15	+9	21	
8	Atlas	14	6	2	6	24	29	−5	20	
9	Tijuana	14	5	4	5	17	19	−2	19	
10	Querétaro	14	5	2	7	19	29	−10	17	
11	Morelia	14	5	1	8	10	29	−19	16	
12	Necaxa	14	2	4	8	8	22	−14	10	
13	León	14	3	1	10	18	42	−24	10	
14	Cruz Azul	14	2	2	10	9	37	−28	8	
15	Santos Laguna	14	1	2	11	11	46	−35	5	
16	Veracruz	14	0	2	12	8	35	−27	2	

Source: Liga MX Femenil
Rules for classification: 1) Points; 2) Goal difference; 3) Number of goals scored; 4) Number of away goals scored; 5) Head-to-head results between tied teams; 6) Drawing of lots
(C) Champions

===== Group 1 =====
Pos	Team	Pld	W	D	L	GF	GA	GD	Pts	Qualification or relegation
1	América	14	11	2	1	48	11	+37	35	Advance to Liguilla
2	Pachuca	14	9	3	2	36	16	+20	30	Advance to Liguilla
3	Toluca	14	8	2	4	26	16	+10	26	
4	UNAM	14	5	6	3	24	15	+9	21	
5	Tijuana	14	5	4	5	17	19	−2	19	
6	Morelia	14	5	1	8	10	29	−19	16	
7	Cruz Azul	14	2	2	10	9	37	−28	8	
8	Veracruz	14	0	2	12	8	35	−27	2	

Source: Liga MX Femenil
Rules for classification: 1) Points; 2) Goal difference; 3) Number of goals scored; 4) Head-to-head results between tied teams; 5) Drawing of lots

===== Group 2 =====
Pos	Team	Pld	W	D	L	GF	GA	GD	Pts	Qualification or relegation
1	UANL	14	11	1	2	51	7	+44	34	Advance to Liguilla
2	Guadalajara	14	11	1	2	33	10	+23	34	Advance to Liguilla
3	Monterrey	14	10	1	3	38	17	+21	31	
4	Atlas	14	6	2	6	24	29	−5	20	
5	Querétaro	14	5	2	7	19	29	−10	17	
6	Necaxa	14	2	4	8	8	22	−14	10	
7	León	14	3	1	10	18	42	−24	10	
8	Santos Laguna	14	1	2	11	11	46	−35	5	

Source: Liga MX Femenil
Rules for classification: 1) Points; 2) Goal difference; 3) Number of goals scored; 4) Head-to-head results between tied teams; 5) Drawing of lots

==== Positions by round ====
The table lists the positions of teams after each week of matches. In order to preserve chronological evolvements, any postponed matches are not included in the round at which they were originally scheduled, but added to the full round they were played immediately afterwards. For example, if a match is scheduled for matchday 8, but then postponed and played between days 11 and 12, it will be added to the standings for day 12.

Leader and qualification to playoffs
Last place

Team ╲ Round	1	2	3	4	5	6	7	8	9	10	11	12	13	14
América	7	1	2	2	3	2	1	1	1	1	2	1	1	1
UANL	8	4	4	3	1	4	3	2	2	2	1	2	2	2
Guadalajara	3	7	5	5	5	5	5	5	4	4	3	3	3	3
Monterrey	1	2	3	4	4	3	2	3	3	3	4	4	4	4
Pachuca	2	3	1	1	2	1	4	4	5	5	5	5	5	5
Toluca	6	5	7	7	9	6	6	6	6	6	6	6	6	6
UNAM	16	12	8	8	7	8	8	8	8	8	7	7	7	7
Atlas	15	11	6	6	6	7	7	7	7	7	8	8	8	8
Tijuana	13	8	10	9	8	9	9	9	10	9	9	9	9	9
Querétaro	9	6	9	10	10	10	10	12	12	12	11	11	11	10
Morelia	4	10	11	12	11	12	12	11	9	10	10	10	10	11
Necaxa	14	15	14	14	15	14	14	14	14	14	12	12	12	12
León	12	14	15	16	13	11	11	10	11	11	13	13	13	13
Cruz Azul	11	16	12	13	14	13	13	13	13	13	14	14	14	14
Santos Laguna	5	9	13	11	12	15	15	15	15	15	15	15	15	15
Veracruz	10	13	16	15	16	16	16	16	16	16	16	16	16	16

Updated to match(es) played on 1 October 2017. Source: Liga MX

==== Results ====
Home \ Away	AMÉ	ATL	CAZ	GUA	LEÓ	MTY	MOR	NEC	PAC	QUE	SLA	TIJ	TOL	UNL	UNM	VER
América			6–0				5–0		3–4			1–0	3–0		1–0	3–1
Atlas				1–1	2–1	4–2		1–1		4–2	3–2			1–2		
Cruz Azul	0–5						0–2		1–9			0–1	0–1		1–4	3–1
Guadalajara		3–0			4–0	1–0		1–0		6–2	6–0			1–0		
León				1–3		0–2		3–0		2–2	5–2			1–8		
Monterrey		4–1		2–1	4–0			5–2		2–1	7–0			2–1		
Morelia	1–7		0–1						0–4			1–0	0–2		0–0	2–1
Necaxa		1–0		0–1	1–0	2–2				0–1	1–1			0–1		
Pachuca	1–1		1–1										0–2		3–0	2–1
Querétaro		4–2		1–3	0–3	0–2		3–0			1–0			0–0		
Santos Laguna		1–2		1–2	2–1	0–3		0–0		1–2				0–6		
Tijuana	2–2		1–0				2–0		1–2				2–2		3–3	1–0
Toluca	1–2		2–1				0–2		4–0			4–0			1–3	3–0
UANL		4–0		2–0	9–0	4–1		3–0		4–0	7–1					
UNAM	0–1		4–1				3–0		1–1			1–1	1–1			3–0
Veracruz	1–8		0–0				0–1		0–2			0–3	2–3		1–1	

Updated to match(es) played on unknown. Source: Liga MX Femenil
Legend: Blue = home team win; Yellow = draw; Red = away team win.

==== Top goalscorers ====
Players sorted first by goals scored, then by last name.

Rank	Player	Club	Goals
1	Lucero Cuevas	América	15
2	Dayana Cázares	América	10
2	Natalia Mauleón	Toluca	10
2	Desirée Monsiváis	Monterrey	10
5	Alicia Cervantes	Atlas	9
5	Carolina Jaramillo	UANL	9
5	Berenice Muñoz	Pachuca	9
8	Daniela Espinosa	América	8
9	Karime Abud	UNAM	7
9	Belén Cruz	UANL	7
9	Katty Martínez	UANL	7
9	Perla Morones	León	7
9	Luz Ruíz	Querétaro	7
9	Blanca Solís	UANL	7
9	Brenda Viramontes	Guadalajara	7

Source: Liga MX Femenil

==== Hat-tricks ====
Player	For	Against	Result	Date
Lucero Cuevas	América	Cruz Azul	5–0	4 August 2017
Natalia Mauleón	Toluca	Veracruz	3–2	19 August 2017
Berenice Muñoz^{4}	Pachuca	Cruz Azul	9–1	19 August 2017
Mónica Ocampo	Pachuca	Cruz Azul	9–1	19 August 2017
Alicia Cervantes	Atlas	Monterrey	4–2	19 August 2017
Brenda Viramontes	Guadalajara	Querétaro	3–1	19 August 2017
Carolina Jaramillo^{4}	UANL	León	9–0	19 August 2017
Blanca Solís	UANL	León	9–0	19 August 2017
Karime Abud	UNAM	Cruz Azul	4–1	26 August 2017
Belén Cruz	UANL	Atlas	4–0	26 August 2017
Daniela Espinosa	América	Veracruz	8–1	9 September 2017
Perla Morones	León	Santos Laguna	5–2	15 September 2017
Belén Cruz	UANL	León	8–1	6 October 2017
Desirée Monsiváis^{4}	Monterrey	Santos Laguna	7–0	28 October 2017

^{4} Player scored four goals

=== Best XI ===
Position	Name	Club
GK	Blanca Félix	Guadalajara
DF	Miriam García	Guadalajara
DF	Jazmín Enrigue	UANL
DF	Natalia Melgoza	Pachuca
MF	Arlett Tovar	Guadalajara
MF	Karla Nieto	Pachuca
MF	Tania Morales	Guadalajara
MF	Mónica Ocampo	Pachuca
FW	Norma Duarte Palafox	Guadalajara
FW	Lucero Cuevas	América
FW	Dayana Cazares	América

Source: LIGA MX Femenil

=== Liguilla – Apertura ===
==== Bracket ====
Semifinals
América	2	2	4
Guadalajara	4	2	6
UANL	0	3	3
Pachuca	4	0	4

Final
Guadalajara	0	3	3
Pachuca	2	0	2

==== Semifinals ====
First leg

4 November 2017
16:30

Guadalajara	4–2	América
Morales 36', 80'; Tovar 60'; Carrandi 90+2'	Report	Cuevas 28'; Espinosa 31'

Estadio Chivas, Zapopan
Attendance: 2,153
Referee: Lucila Venegas Montes

6 November 2017
21:00

Pachuca	4–0	UANL
Ocampo 63'; Ángeles 71', 90+2'; Nieto 89'	Report

Estadio Hidalgo, Pachuca
Referee: Alan Michelle López

Second leg

11 November 2017
16:00

América	2–2	Guadalajara
Cázares 57'; Cuevas 87'	Report	Viramontes 8'; Palafox 52'

Estadio Azteca, Mexico City
Attendance: 18,827
Referee: Quetzalli Alvarado

Guadalajara won 6–4 on aggregate

11 November 2017
19:00

UANL	3–0	Pachuca
Rangel 29'; Ovalle 55'; Mercado 65'	Report

Estadio Universitario, San Nicolás de los Garza
Attendance: 14,702
Referee: Francia María González

Pachuca won 4–3 on aggregate

==== Final ====
First leg

20 November 2017
21:06

Pachuca	2–0	Guadalajara
Ángeles 38'; Ocampo 68'	Report

Estadio Hidalgo, Pachuca
Attendance: 28,955
Referee: Lucila Venegas Montes

Second leg

24 November 2017
20:06

Guadalajara	3–0	Pachuca
Tovar 37', 56'; Palafox 68'	Report

Estadio Omnilife, Zapopan
Attendance: 32,466
Referee: Quetzalli Alvarado

Guadalajara won 3–2 on aggregate

Apertura 2017 Liga MX Femenil winners:

1st title

== Torneo Clausura ==
The Clausura 2018 is the second championship of the season.

=== Regular season ===
==== Standings ====
===== Table =====
Pos	Team	Pld	W	D	L	GF	GA	GD	Pts	Qualification or relegation
1	Monterrey	14	11	1	2	45	13	+32	34	Advance to Liguilla (Note: The two best teams of each group advance to the semifinals of the Liguilla.)
2	América	14	10	3	1	47	11	+36	33	Advance to Liguilla
3	UANL (C)	14	10	1	3	38	16	+22	31	Advance to Liguilla
4	Guadalajara	14	9	2	3	30	13	+17	29	
5	Toluca	14	9	2	3	22	13	+9	29	Advance to Liguilla
6	Pachuca	14	9	1	4	32	13	+19	28	
7	UNAM	14	7	3	4	18	7	+11	24	
8	Santos Laguna	14	8	0	6	21	19	+2	24	
9	Veracruz	14	5	3	6	10	19	−9	18	
10	Querétaro	14	5	3	6	21	32	−11	18	
11	Cruz Azul	14	3	3	8	9	26	−17	12	
12	Tijuana	14	2	4	8	11	21	−10	10	
13	Necaxa	14	3	1	10	10	34	−24	10	
14	León	14	2	3	9	20	39	−19	9	
15	Atlas	14	2	1	11	15	34	−19	7	
16	Morelia	14	0	3	11	8	47	−39	3	

Source: Liga MX Femenil
Rules for classification: 1) Points; 2) Goal difference; 3) Number of goals scored; 4) Number of away goals scored; 5) Head-to-head results between tied teams; 6) Drawing of lots
(C) Champions

===== Group 1 =====
Pos	Team	Pld	W	D	L	GF	GA	GD	Pts	Qualification or relegation
1	América (A)	14	10	3	1	47	11	+36	33	Advance to Liguilla
2	Toluca (A)	14	9	2	3	22	13	+9	29	Advance to Liguilla
3	Pachuca	14	9	1	4	32	13	+19	28	
4	UNAM	14	7	3	4	18	7	+11	24	
5	Veracruz	14	5	3	6	10	19	−9	18	
6	Cruz Azul	14	3	3	8	9	26	−17	12	
7	Tijuana	14	2	4	8	11	21	−10	10	
8	Morelia	14	0	3	11	8	47	−39	3	

Source: Liga MX Femenil
(A) Advance to a further round

===== Group 2 =====
Pos	Team	Pld	W	D	L	GF	GA	GD	Pts	Qualification or relegation
1	Monterrey (A)	14	11	1	2	45	13	+32	34	Advance to Liguilla
2	UANL (A)	14	10	1	3	38	16	+22	31	Advance to Liguilla
3	Guadalajara	14	9	2	3	30	13	+17	29	
4	Santos Laguna	14	8	0	6	21	19	+2	24	
5	Querétaro	14	5	3	6	21	32	−11	18	
6	Necaxa	14	3	1	10	10	34	−24	10	
7	León	14	2	3	9	20	39	−19	9	
8	Atlas	14	2	1	11	15	34	−19	7	

Source: Liga MX Femenil
(A) Advance to a further round

==== Positions by round ====
The table lists the positions of teams after each week of matches. In order to preserve chronological evolvements, any postponed matches are not included in the round at which they were originally scheduled, but added to the full round they were played immediately afterwards. For example, if a match is scheduled for matchday 13, but then postponed and played between days 16 and 17, it will be added to the standings for day 16.

Leader and qualification to playoffs
Qualification to playoffs
Last place

Team ╲ Round	1	2	3	4	5	6	7	8	9	10	11	12	13	14
Monterrey	1	6	4	3	3	2	1	1	1	1	1	1	1	1
América	11	9	5	4	4	3	2	4	3	4	4	3	2	2
UANL	3	1	1	5	5	4	5	3	2	2	2	2	4	3
Guadalajara	9	3	2	2	1	5	3	2	4	5	5	6	5	4
Toluca	4	4	3	1	2	1	4	5	5	3	3	4	3	5
Pachuca	12	15	9	7	6	8	6	7	9	7	7	7	6	6
UNAM	13	7	7	6	8	6	7	6	6	6	6	5	7	7
Santos Laguna	14	8	11	8	10	11	10	8	7	8	8	8	8	8
Veracruz	5	2	6	9	7	9	9	10	8	9	9	9	9	9
Querétaro	10	13	16	14	9	7	8	9	10	10	10	10	10	10
Cruz Azul	6	5	8	10	11	10	11	11	11	12	12	13	13	11
Tijuana	8	14	15	16	16	16	16	13	13	14	14	14	14	12
Necaxa	15	11	12	13	14	12	12	12	12	11	11	11	11	13
León	16	16	13	12	13	14	15	16	15	13	13	12	12	14
Atlas	2	10	10	11	12	13	13	14	14	15	15	15	15	15
Morelia	7	12	14	15	15	15	14	15	16	16	16	16	16	16

Source: Liga MX

==== Results ====
Home \ Away	AMÉ	ATL	CAZ	GUA	LEÓ	MTY	MOR	NEC	PAC	QUE	SLA	TIJ	TOL	UNL	UNM	VER
América			7–1				6–1		2–1			3–0	1–2		1–0	4–0
Atlas				1–3	0–1	2–4		3–0		1–1	4–2			1–3		
Cruz Azul	0–4						3–0		0–2			1–0	0–1		1–0	0–1
Guadalajara		3–1			2–0	2–0		1–2		2–0	0–1			1–2		
León		4–1		0–3		2–4		1–2		2–2	0–1			2–2		
Monterrey		6–1		1–1	6–1			8–0		2–0	2–1			0–2		
Morelia	1–12		1–1						1–7			0–1	1–3		0–0	0–1
Necaxa		2–0		1–2	2–2	0–2				0–2	0–1			0–2		
Pachuca	2–3		4–0				4–1					1–0	3–1		0–2	0–0
Querétaro		1–0		1–1	4–2	1–7		4–1			1–2			3–2		
Santos Laguna		2–0		1–4	4–2	0–1		2–0		3–1				0–2		
Tijuana	0–1		0–0				2–2		2–4				1–2		0–0	
Toluca	1–1		1–1				3–0		0–3			3–0			0–1	2–0
UANL		2–0		2–5	6–1	0–2		4–0		7–0	2–1					
UNAM	1–1		3–0				2–0		0–1			3–0	1–2			2–1
Veracruz	1–1		2–1				2–0		1–0			0–4	0–1		0–3	

Updated to match(es) played on unknown. Source: Liga MX Femenil
Legend: Blue = home team win; Yellow = draw; Red = away team win.

==== Top goalscorers ====
Players sorted first by goals scored, then by last name.

Rank	Player	Club	Goals
1	Lucero Cuevas	América	15
2	Desirée Monsiváis	Monterrey	10
3	Casandra Cuevas	América	9
4	Lizbeth Ángeles	Pachuca	8
4	Viridiana Salazar	Pachuca	8
4	Leticia Vázquez	León	8
7	Noralí Armenta	Monterrey	7
7	Dayana Cázares	América	7
7	Belén Cruz	UANL	7
7	Natalia Mauleón	Toluca	7
7	Zaira Miranda	Toluca	7
7	Daniela Solís	Monterrey	7

Source: Liga MX Femenil

=== Liguilla – Clausura ===
==== Bracket ====
Semifinals
Monterrey	0	4	4
Toluca	0	1	1
América	0	2	2
UANL	3	1	4

Final
Monterrey	2	2	4 (2)
UANL (p)	2	2	4 (4)

==== Semifinals ====
First leg

15 April 2018
18:00

Toluca	0–0	Monterrey
	Report

Estadio Nemesio Díez, Toluca
Attendance: 14,850
Referee: Francia María González

16 April 2018
20:00

UANL	3–0	América
Solís 18'; Jaramillo 42'; Cruz 47'	Report

Estadio Universitario, San Nicolás de los Garza
Attendance: 14,118
Referee: Priscila Eritzel Pérez

Second leg

22 April 2018
17:00

América	2–1	UANL
Fuentes 11'; Antonio 74' (o.g.)	Report	Ovalle 62'

Estadio Azteca, Mexico City
Attendance: 6,051
Referee: Antonio de Jesús Olalde

UANL won 4–2 on aggregate

23 April 2018
19:00

Monterrey	4–1	Toluca
Evangelista 12', 69'; Monsiváis 53'; Castillo 90+4'	Report	Téllez 21'

Estadio BBVA Bancomer, Guadalupe
Attendance: 10,180
Referee: Mario Terrazas Chávez

Monterrey won 4–1 on aggregate

==== Finals ====
First leg

27 April 2018
21:00

UANL	2–2	Monterrey
Cruz 11'; López 90+4' (o.g.)	Report	Bernal 25' (pen.); Monsiváis 27'

Estadio Universitario, San Nicolás de los Garza
Attendance: 38,230
Referee: Mario Terrazas Chávez

Second leg

4 May 2018
20:30

Monterrey	2–2	UANL
Bernal 50'; Armenta 90+2'	Report	Ovalle 19'; Martínez 79'
Penalties
Bernal (penalty missed); Garza (penalty scored); Castillo (penalty scored); Armenta (penalty missed)	2–4	(penalty scored) Rangel; (penalty scored) Antonio; (penalty scored) Villareal; (penalty scored) Mercado

Estadio BBVA Bancomer, Guadalupe
Attendance: 51,211
Referee: Eduardo Alberto Velázquez

4–4 on aggregate. UANL won on penalty kicks.

Clausura 2018 Liga MX Femenil winners:

1st title
