= C.D. Guadalajara (women) =

Guadalajara Femenil
- Full name: Club Deportivo Guadalajara S.A. de C.V. Femenil
- Nicknames: Las Chivas; Las Rojiblancas
- Founded: 2016; 10 years ago
- Ground: Estadio Akron; Zapopan, Jalisco
- Capacity: 46,232
- Owner: Grupo Omnilife
- Chairman: Amaury Vergara
- Manager: Antonio Contreras
- League: Liga Femenil
- Clausura 2026: Regular phase: 5th Final phase: Quarter-finals
- Website: chivasdecorazon.com.mx/femenil
Home colours	Away colours

C.D. Guadalajara Femenil, also simply known as Chivas Femenil, is a Mexican professional women's football club based in Zapopan, Jalisco that competes in the Liga Femenil. The club has been the women's section of Guadalajara since 2017. Nicknames for the team are Chivas and the Rebaño Sagrado, the same as the men's team. The team play its home matches at the Estadio Akron.

C.D. Guadalajara Femenil is one of only five clubs that have been able to win the Liga Femenil title, winning the league title on two occasions.

== History ==
=== Professional era, the beginning ===
C.D. Guadalajara Femenil was founded on December 5, 2016, the same day that the Liga MX Femenil was announced by the Federación Mexicana de Fútbol (FMF). Luis Camacho was appointed as the first manager of Chivas femenil on 3 January 2017. Previous to the first season of the Liga MX Femenil, Chivas participated in their first official tournament, the 2017 Copa MX Femenil, a tournament that was created to prepare all the Liga MX Femenil teams for the first season of the league.

Chivas femenil played its first league match in history against city rivals Atlas on July 29, 2017 in front of a crowd of around 1,000 persons. The match was the first instance of the Clásico Tapatío in the Liga MX Femenil, and ended in a 3–0 victory in favor of Chivas, with Anette Vázquez scoring Chivas first league goal in history.

=== First league title ===
It didn't take long for Chivas Femenil to win its first league title as the team was able to win the first league tournament, the Apertura 2017. In this Apertura 2017 tournament, Chivas ended the regular phase of the tournament on the second place of its group behind Tigres with 34 pts and fourth in the general standings. In the Liguilla, Chivas faced Club América, in the first instance of the Clásico Nacional in the Liga MX Femenil. Chivas ended up winning the semifinal against America with a resounding 6–4 aggregate score. In the final, Chivas faced Pachuca who were the winners of the 2017 Copa MX Femenil. On the first leg of the Final at the Estadio Hidalgo in Pachuca, Hidalgo, Pachuca came out victorius with a favorable 2–0 scoreline. Nonetheless, Chivas would endup crowning themselves league champions by defeating Pachuca 3–0 on the second leg at the Estadio Chivas (now Estadio Akron), in front of a 32,466 persons.

=== 2018 to present ===
Although Chivas Femenil ended in fourth place in the general standings of the Clausura 2018 tournament with 29 points, they were unable to qualify to the playoffs due to ending the regular phase in the third place of its respective group. Due to the performance of the team during the Clausura 2018, the club decided to dismiss manager Luis Camacho on December 29, 2018. On the same day, the club also appointed Luis Manuel Díaz as the new manager of Chivas Femenil.

== Players ==
=== Current squad ===
As of 14 September 2026

Note: Flags indicate national team as defined under FIFA eligibility rules; some limited exceptions apply. Players may hold more than one non-FIFA nationality.

No.	Pos.	Nation	Player
1	GK	MEX	Heidi González
2	DF	MEX	Jaqueline Rodríguez
3	DF	MEX	Damaris Godínez
4	DF	MEX	Natalia Colin (on loan from Tigres UANL)
5	DF	MEX	Cristina Ferral (on loan from Tigres UANL)
8	MF	MEX	Carolina Jaramillo
9	FW	MEX	Gabriela Valenzuela
10	FW	MEX	Adriana Iturbide
12	GK	MEX	Blanca Félix
13	MF	MEX	Mayra Pelayo-Bernal

No.	Pos.	Nation	Player
14	MF	MEX	Natalia Mauleón
16	MF	MEX	Eva González
17	DF	MEX	Natalia Villarreal
19	MF	MEX	Valeria Alvarado
21	DF	GUA	Samantha López
22	MF	MEX	Denise Castro
23	FW	MEX	Jasmine Casarez
24	FW	MEX	Alicia Cervantes (captain)
25	MF	MEX	Joseline Montoya
30	FW	MEX	Viridiana Salazar

=== Out on loan ===
No.	Pos.	Nation	Player
—	DF	MEX	Ana Lorena Torres (at Atlante)
—	DF	MEX	Araceli Torres (at Cruz Azul)
—	MF	MEX	Daniela Delgado (at Atlético San Luis)
—	MF	MEX	Ivonne González (at Santos Laguna)

No.	Pos.	Nation	Player
—	MF	MEX	Vanessa González (at Atlante)
—	MF	MEX	Amalia López (at Querétaro)
—	MF	MEX	Dana Sandoval (at Tijuana)

== Personnel ==
=== Club administration ===
Position	Staff
Chairman	(Mexico) Amaury Vergara
Sporting director	(Mexico) Nelly Simón

=== Coaching staff ===
Position	Staff
Manager	(Spain) Antonio Contreras
Assistant managers	(Mexico) José Fernández (Mexico) Alejandro Flores
Fitness coach	(Mexico) Mario Domínguez
Team doctor	(Mexico) Fernando Díaz
Team doctor assistant	(Mexico) José Carrillo

== Managerial history ==
Manager	Years	Notes
(Mexico) Luis Camacho	2017–2018	
(Mexico) Luis Manuel Díaz	2019	
(Mexico) Ramón Villa Zevallos	2019–2020	
(Mexico) Édgar Mejía	2020–2021	
(Mexico) Juan Pablo Alfaro	2022–2023	
(Argentina) Antonio Spinelli	2023–2024	
(Mexico) Joaquín Moreno	2024	Interim manager
(Spain) Antonio Contreras	2025–	

== Seasons ==
Season	Tournament	League record									Playoffs record								Top goalscorer	
Season	Tournament	P	W	D	L	GF	GA	GD	Pts	Rank	P	W	D	L	GF	GA	GD	Result	Player	Goals
2017–18	Apertura 2017	14	11	1	2	33	10	+23	34	3rd	4	2	1	1	9	6	+3	W	(Mexico) Brenda Viramontes	8
2017–18	Clausura 2018	14	9	2	3	30	13	+17	29	4th	Did not qualify								(Mexico) Brenda Viramontes	5
2018–19	Apertura 2018	16	9	4	3	30	16	+14	31	4th	4	0	3	1	4	6	–2	SF	(Mexico) Norma Palafox	7
2018–19	Clausura 2019	16	7	2	7	17	17	0	23	8th	Did not qualify								(Mexico) Nicole Pérez	5
2019–20	Apertura 2019	18	9	4	5	30	23	+7	31	5th	2	0	0	2	0	3	–3	QF	(Mexico) Rubí Soto	5
2019–20	Clausura 2020	10	5	3	2	16	10	+6	18	3rd (Note: On 22 May 2020, the Clausura tournament was canceled due to the COVID-19 pandemic; in that moment Guadalajara was ranked third.)	Tournament canceled								(Mexico) Yashira Barrientos	5

== Records ==
=== Most goals ===
#	Player	Goals (Note: includes Liga MX Femenil regular season and playoffs.)
1	(Mexico) Rubí Soto	20
2	(Mexico) Tania Morales	19
3	(Mexico) Brenda Viramontes	18
4	(Mexico) Norma Palafox	17
4	(Mexico) Arlett Tovar	17

=== Most appearances ===
#	Player	Apps (Note: includes Liga MX Femenil regular season and playoffs.)	Career
1	(Mexico) Tania Morales	88	2017–
2	(Mexico) Blanca Félix	85	2017–
2	(Mexico) Andrea Sánchez	85	2017–
4	(Mexico) Brenda Viramontes	70	2017–2019
5	(Mexico) Norma Palafox	69	2017–2020

== Honors ==
=== National ===
- Liga MX Femenil
  - Champions (2): Apertura 2017, Clausura 2022
  - Runners-up (1): Guardianes 2021
- Campeón de Campeonas
  - Champions (1): 2022
