= 2017–18 C.F. Monterrey (women) season =

Monterrey
2017–18 season
- Chairman: José González Ornelas
- Manager: Gustavo Leal (until 13 October); Eliud Contreras (13 October to 5 December); Héctor Becerra (from 5 December)
- Stadium: Estadio BBVA Bancomer
- Apertura: 4th
- Clausura: Runners-up (1st)
- Top goalscorer: Desirée Monsiváis (22 goals)
- Biggest win: Monterrey 8–0 Necaxa (28 January 2018)
- Biggest defeat: UANL 4–1 Monterrey (21 October 2017)
Home colours	Away colours

The 2017–18 season was Monterrey's first competitive season and first season in the Liga MX Femenil, the top flight of Mexican women's football.

On the Apertura 2017 tournament, Monterrey finished fourth and failed to qualified for the playoffs. For the next tournament, the Rayadas finished first during the regular season and managed to get to the championship final, where they lost against rivals UANL in penalties, in the women's version of the Clásico Regiomontano.

== Squad ==
=== Apertura ===
No.	Nat.	Name	Date of birth (age)	Since
Goalkeepers
1	(Mexico)	Claudia Lozoya	7 June 1995 (aged 22)	2017
12	(Mexico)	Sandra Estrada	25 April 1996 (aged 21)	2017
24	(Mexico)	Karla Ramírez	21 January 2000 (aged 17)	2017
Defenders
2	(Mexico)	Alexia Frías	27 November 1994 (aged 22)	2017
3	(Mexico)	Katia Estrada	26 August 1999 (aged 17)	2017
4	(Mexico)	Rebeca Bernal (Captain)	31 August 1997 (aged 19)	2017
5	(Mexico)	Sarahí Leyva	30 January 1997 (aged 20)	2017
6	(Mexico)	Flor Mejía	25 February 1995 (aged 22)	2017
7	(Mexico)	Hilary García	19 September 1997 (aged 19)	2017
16	(Mexico)	Selena Castillo	14 April 1995 (aged 22)	2017
17	(Mexico)	Dafne Garibay	14 July 1997 (aged 20)	2017
19	(Mexico)	Mariana Cadena	13 February 1995 (aged 22)	2017
22	(Mexico)	Alejandra Sorchini	30 April 1994 (aged 23)	2017
Midfielders
13	(Mexico)	Sofía Ochoa	17 November 1995 (aged 21)	2017
15	(Mexico)	Lourdes de León	4 March 2002 (aged 15)	2017
18	(Mexico)	Gelymar Melo	10 August 2000 (aged 16)	2017
20	(Mexico)	Daniela Solís	19 April 1993 (aged 24)	2017
21	(Mexico)	Montserrat Bernal	27 December 1995 (aged 21)	2017
23	(Mexico)	Ángela Carreón	7 January 2001 (aged 16)	2017
Forwards
8	(Mexico)	Diana Evangelista	5 November 1994 (aged 22)	2017
9	(Mexico)	Desirée Monsiváis (Vice-captain)	19 January 1988 (aged 29)	2017
10	(Mexico)	Dinora Garza	24 January 1988 (aged 29)	2017
11	(Mexico)	Pamela Verdirame	20 February 1997 (aged 20)	2017

=== Clausura ===
No.	Nat.	Name	Date of birth (age)	Since
Goalkeepers
1	(Mexico)	Claudia Lozoya	7 June 1995 (aged 22)	2017
24	(Mexico)	Karla Ramírez	21 January 2000 (aged 17)	2017
29	(Mexico)	Wendy Toledo	13 September 2000 (aged 17)	2018
Defenders
2	(Mexico)	Alexia Frías	27 November 1994 (aged 23)	2017
3	(Mexico)	Katia Estrada	26 August 1999 (aged 18)	2017
4	(Mexico)	Rebeca Bernal (Captain)	31 August 1997 (aged 20)	2017
5	(Mexico)	Sarahí Leyva	30 January 1997 (aged 20)	2017
7	(Mexico)	Hilary García	19 September 1997 (aged 20)	2017
16	(Mexico)	Selena Castillo	14 April 1995 (aged 22)	2017
19	(Mexico)	Mariana Cadena	13 February 1995 (aged 22)	2017
22	(Mexico)	Alejandra Sorchini	30 April 1994 (aged 23)	2017
26	(Mexico)	Valeria Valdez	29 January 1994 (aged 23)	2018
27	(Mexico)	Victoria López	12 April 2001 (aged 16)	2018
28	(Mexico)	Vanessa López	26 September 1998 (aged 19)	2018
Midfielders
13	(Mexico)	Sofía Ochoa	17 November 1995 (aged 22)	2017
14	(Mexico)	Mariana Partida	4 May 2002 (aged 15)	2018
15	(Mexico)	Lourdes de León	4 March 2002 (aged 15)	2017
18	(Mexico)	Gelymar Melo	10 August 2000 (aged 17)	2017
20	(Mexico)	Daniela Solís	19 April 1993 (aged 24)	2017
21	(Mexico)	Montserrat Bernal	27 December 1995 (aged 22)	2017
23	(Mexico)	Ángela Carreón	7 January 2001 (aged 17)	2017
25	(Mexico)	Norali Armenta	28 August 1995 (aged 22)	2018
Forwards
8	(Mexico)	Diana Evangelista	5 November 1994 (aged 23)	2017
9	(Mexico)	Desirée Monsiváis	19 January 1988 (aged 29)	2017
10	(Mexico)	Dinora Garza	24 January 1988 (aged 29)	2017
11	(Mexico)	Pamela Verdirame	20 February 1997 (aged 20)	2017

== Coaching staff ==
Position	Staff
Manager	(Mexico) Héctor Becerra
Assistant manager	(Mexico) Eliud Contreras
Doctor	(Mexico) Isis Guerrero
Fitness coach	(Mexico) Javier Flores

== Competitions ==
=== Overview ===
Competition	First match	Last match	Starting round	Final position	Record							
Competition	First match	Last match	Starting round	Final position	Pld	W	D	L	GF	GA	GD	Win %
Apertura	30 July 2017	28 October 2017	Matchday 1	4th	14	10	1	3	38	17	+21	71.43
Clausura	7 January 2018	4 May 2018	Matchday 1	Runner-ups	18	12	4	2	53	18	+35	66.67
Total					32	22	5	5	91	35	+56	68.75

Source: Competitions

=== Torneo Apertura ===
==== League table ====
Pos	Team	Pld	W	D	L	GF	GA	GD	Pts	Qualification or relegation
2	UANL	14	11	1	2	51	7	+44	34	Advance to Liguilla (Note: The two best teams of each group advance to the semifinals of the Liguilla.)
3	Guadalajara (C)	14	11	1	2	33	10	+23	34	Advance to Liguilla
4	Monterrey	14	10	1	3	38	17	+21	31	
5	Pachuca	14	9	3	2	36	16	+20	30	Advance to Liguilla
6	Toluca	14	8	2	4	26	16	+10	26	

Source: Liga MX Femenil
Rules for classification: 1) Points; 2) Goal difference; 3) Number of goals scored; 4) Number of away goals scored; 5) Head-to-head results between tied teams; 6) Drawing of lots
(C) Champions

==== Matches ====
30 July 2017 1	Monterrey	5–2	Necaxa	Santiago, Nuevo León
10:30	Ochoa 3'; Verdirame 18'; Frías 31'; Mejía 41'; Melo 78'	Report	Villalobos 30'; Huerta 53'	Stadium: El Barrial; Referee: Carolina Briones

4 August 2017 2	León	0–2	Monterrey	León, Guanajuato
10:00		Report	Verdirame 48'; Garza 74'	Stadium: Estadio León; Referee: Priscila Pérez

12 August 2017 3	Monterrey	2–1	Querétaro	Guadalupe, Nuevo León
21:15	Verdirame 22'; Frías 37'	Report	Vázquez 40'	Stadium: Estadio BBVA Bancomer; Referee: Oscar Rosales

19 August 2017 4	Atlas	4–2	Monterrey	Zapopan, Jalisco
11:00	Cervantes 10', 52', 90+2' (pen.); Zavala 85'	Report	Verdirame 73', 78'	Stadium: Estadio Alfredo "Pistache" Torres; Referee: Harold Rodríguez

27 August 2017 5	Monterrey	2–1	Guadalajara	Guadalupe, Nuevo León
10:00	R. Bernal 61'; Monsiváis 90+1'	Report	Tovar 53'	Stadium: Estadio BBVA Bancomer; Referee: Fabián Gaspar

2 September 2017 6	Monterrey	2–1	UANL	Guadalupe, Nuevo León
19:15	R. Bernal 6'; Solís 80'	Report	Solís 42'	Stadium: Estadio BBVA Bancomer; Referee: Edgar de Lira

9 September 2017 7	Santos Laguna	0–3	Monterrey	Torreón, Coahuila
9:00		Report	Solís 58'; Garza 84'; Frías 89'	Stadium: Estadio Corona; Referee: Erick Iván García

15 September 2017 8	Necaxa	2–2	Monterrey	Aguascalientes City, Aguascalientes
16:00	Huerta 31', 37'	Report	Solís 12'; R. Bernal 45'	Stadium: Estadio Victoria; Referee: Steffy Molina

30 September 2017 10	Querétaro	0–2	Monterrey	Querétaro City, Querétaro
11:00		Report	Monsiváis 25', 54'	Stadium: Estadio Corregidora; Referee: Ricardo Chávez

7 October 2017 11	Monterrey	4–1	Atlas	Guadalupe, Nuevo León
17:00	Monsiváis 7'; Solís 11', 44'; M. Bernal 51'	Report	Curiel 67'	Stadium: Estadio BBVA Bancomer; Referee: Fabián Gaspar

15 October 2017 12	Guadalajara	1–0	Monterrey	Zapopan, Jalisco
12:00	Palafox 21'	Report		Stadium: Verde Valle; Referee: Oscar Yair Toledo

18 October 2017 9	Monterrey	4–0	León	Santiago, Nuevo León
17:00	Monsiváis 1', 11'; Evangelista 41'; Frías 57'	Report		Stadium: El Barrial; Referee: Erick Juárez

21 October 2017 13	UANL	4–1	Monterrey	San Nicolás de los Garza, Nuevo León
21:05	Jaramillo 9'; Martínez 12', 45'; Rangel 25'	Report	Evangelista 62'	Stadium: Estadio Universitario; Referee: Aldo Ballesteros

28 October 2017 14	Monterrey	7–0	Santos Laguna	Santiago, Nuevo León
11:00	Monsiváis 1', 24', 71', 75'; Garza 30', 46'; Verdirame 78'	Report		Stadium: El Barrial; Referee: Carlos Alberto Rojas

=== Torneo Clausura ===
==== League table ====
Pos	Team	Pld	W	D	L	GF	GA	GD	Pts	Qualification or relegation
1	Monterrey	14	11	1	2	45	13	+32	34	Advance to Liguilla (Note: The two best teams of each group advance to the semifinals of the Liguilla.)
2	América	14	10	3	1	47	11	+36	33	Advance to Liguilla
3	UANL (C)	14	10	1	3	38	16	+22	31	Advance to Liguilla
4	Guadalajara	14	9	2	3	30	13	+17	29	
5	Toluca	14	9	2	3	22	13	+9	29	Advance to Liguilla

Source: Liga MX Femenil
Rules for classification: 1) Points; 2) Goal difference; 3) Number of goals scored; 4) Number of away goals scored; 5) Head-to-head results between tied teams; 6) Drawing of lots
(C) Champions

==== Matches ====
7 January 2018 1	Monterrey	6–1	León	Santiago, Nuevo León
10:30	R. Bernal 11'; Monsiváis 18'; Armenta 31'; Evangelista 58', 81'; Garza 65'	Report	Vázquez 4'	Stadium: El Barrial; Referee: Erick Juárez

13 January 2018 2	Guadalajara	2–0	Monterrey	Zapopan, Jalisco
16:30	Velázquez 39'; Bejarano 40'	Report		Stadium: Estadio Akron; Referee: Louis Adrian Vielmas

21 January 2018 3	Monterrey	2–0	Querétaro	Santiago, Nuevo León
10:30	Monsiváis 49'; López 72'	Report		Stadium: El Barrial; Referee: Juan Francisco Sánchez

28 January 2018 4	Monterrey	8–0	Necaxa	Santiago, Nuevo León
10:30	Evangelista 9'; Solís 13', 51'; Cadena 29'; R. Bernal 34'; Armenta 39', 59'; Sánchez 74' (o.g.)	Report		Stadium: El Barrial; Referee: Kevin Contreras

3 February 2018 5	Atlas	2–4	Monterrey	Zapopan, Jalisco
11:00	García 37'; Santana 55' (pen.)	Report	Armenta 6', 19'; Solís 44'; R. Bernal 81' (pen.)	Stadium: Estadio Alfredo "Pistache" Torres; Referee: Alan Martínez

11 February 2018 6	Monterrey	2–1	Santos Laguna	Santiago, Nuevo León
10:30	Armenta 13'; Monsiváis 28'	Report	Noriega 56'	Stadium: El Barrial; Referee: Karen Hernández

19 February 2018 7	UANL	0–2	Monterrey	San Nicolás de los Garza, Nuevo León
20:00		Report	Solís 9'; Valdez 40'	Stadium: Estadio Universitario; Referee: Eduardo Vázquez

26 February 2018 8	León	2–4	Monterrey	León, Guanajuato
21:00	Cuéllar 44'; Vázquez 46'	Report	Monsiváis 33' (pen.), 52', 73'; Garza 50'	Stadium: Estadio León; Referee: Francia González

5 March 2018 9	Monterrey	1–1	Guadalajara	Guadalupe, Nuevo León
21:00	R. Bernal 5' (pen.)	Report	Soto 48'	Stadium: Estadio BBVA Bancomer; Referee: Antonio de Jesús Olalde

10 March 2018 10	Querétaro	1–7	Monterrey	Querétaro City, Querétaro
11:00	Arredondo 49'	Report	Monsiváis 16' (pen.), 85'; Garza 22', 74', 80'; Armenta 72'; R. Bernal 76'	Stadium: Estadio Corregidora; Referee: Edgardo Espejo

16 March 2018 11	Necaxa	0–2	Monterrey	Aguascalientes City, Aguascalientes
16:00		Report	Monsiváis 27'; Castillo 49'	Stadium: Estadio Victoria; Referee: Iván de Jesús Velasco

26 March 2018 12	Monterrey	6–1	Atlas	Guadalupe, Nuevo León
21:00	Solís 1', 21', 31'; Evangelista 4'; R. Bernal 38' (pen.); Castillo 44'	Report	García 78'	Stadium: Estadio BBVA Bancomer; Referee: Juan Rafael Canales

2 April 2018 13	Santos Laguna	0–1	Monterrey	Torreón, Coahuila
21:00		Report	Monsiváis 60'	Stadium: Estadio Corona; Referee: Héctor Pineda

8 April 2018 14	Monterrey	0–2	UANL	Santiago, Nuevo León
10:30		Report	Cruz 40'; Ovalle 53'	Stadium: El Barrial; Referee: Antonio Olalde

==== Playoffs ====
===== Semifinals =====
15 April 2018 First leg	Toluca	0–0	Monterrey	Toluca, State of Mexico
18:00		Report		Stadium: Estadio Nemesio Díez; Referee: Francia González

23 April 2018 Second leg	Monterrey	4–1 (4–1 agg.)	Toluca	Guadalupe, Nuevo León
19:00	Evangelista 11', 68'; Monsiváis 52'; Castillo 90+3'	Report	Téllez 20'	Stadium: Estadio BBVA Bancomer; Referee: Mario Terrazas

===== Final =====
27 April 2018 First leg	UANL	2–2	Monterrey	San Nicolás de los Garza, Nuevo León
21:00	Cruz 10'; López 90+4' (o.g.)	Report	R. Bernal 24' (pen.); Monsiváis 26'	Stadium: Estadio Universitario; Referee: Mario Terrazas

4 May 2018 Second leg	Monterrey	2–2 (a.e.t.) (4–4 agg.) (2–4 p)	UANL	Guadalupe, Nuevo León
20:30	Bernal 49' (pen.); Armenta 90+2'	Report	Ovalle 18'; Martínez 78'	Stadium: Estadio BBVA Bancomer; Referee: Eduardo Alberto Vázquez
	Penalties
	Bernal (penalty missed); Garza (penalty scored); Castillo (penalty scored); Armenta (penalty missed)		(penalty scored) Rangel; (penalty scored) Antonio; (penalty scored) Villarreal; (penalty scored) Mercado

== Statistics ==
=== Appearances and goals ===
No.	Pos	Nat	Player	Total		Apertura		Clausura	
No.	Pos	Nat	Player	Apps	Goals	Apps	Goals	Apps	Goals
1	GK	(Mexico) MEX	Claudia Lozoya	26	0	13	0	13	0
2	DF	(Mexico) MEX	Alexia Frías	25	4	13	4	12	0
3	DF	(Mexico) MEX	Katia Estrada	18	0	12	0	6	0
4	DF	(Mexico) MEX	Rebeca Bernal	28	11	10	3	18	8
5	DF	(Mexico) MEX	Sarahí Leyva	4	0	3	0	1	0
6	DF	(Mexico) MEX	Flor Mejía	8	0	8	0	0	0
7	DF	(Mexico) MEX	Hilary García	28	0	14	0	14	0
8	FW	(Mexico) MEX	Diana Evangelista	24	8	6	2	18	6
9	FW	(Mexico) MEX	Desirée Monsiváis	22	22	8	10	14	12
10	FW	(Mexico) MEX	Dinora Garza	20	9	7	4	13	5
11	FW	(Mexico) MEX	Pamela Verdirame	22	6	13	6	9	0
13	MF	(Mexico) MEX	Sofía Ochoa	16	1	11	1	5	0
14	MF	(Mexico) MEX	Mariana Partida	3	0	0	0	3	0
15	MF	(Mexico) MEX	Lourdes de León	6	0	5	0	1	0
16	DF	(Mexico) MEX	Selena Castillo	31	3	13	0	18	3
17	DF	(Mexico) MEX	Dafne Garibay	2	0	2	0	0	0
18	MF	(Mexico) MEX	Gelymar Melo	12	1	9	1	3	0
19	DF	(Mexico) MEX	Mariana Cadena	27	1	9	0	18	1
20	MF	(Mexico) MEX	Daniela Solís	15	12	6	5	9	7
21	MF	(Mexico) MEX	Montserrat Bernal	17	1	13	1	4	0
22	DF	(Mexico) MEX	Alejandra Sorchini	24	0	9	0	15	0
23	MF	(Mexico) MEX	Ángela Carreón	8	0	7	0	1	0
24	GK	(Mexico) MEX	Karla Ramírez	3	0	2	0	1	0
25	MF	(Mexico) MEX	Norali Armenta	18	8	0	0	18	8
26	DF	(Mexico) MEX	Valeria Valdez	18	1	0	0	18	1
27	DF	(Mexico) MEX	Victoria López	6	1	0	0	6	1
28	DF	(Mexico) MEX	Vanessa López	8	0	0	0	8	0
29	GK	(Mexico) MEX	Wendy Toledo	5	0	0	0	5	0

=== Goalscorers ===
Rank	Pos.	No.	Player	Apertura	Clausura	Total
1	FW	9	(Mexico) Desirée Monsiváis	10	12	22
2	MF	20	(Mexico) Daniela Solís	5	7	12
3	DF	4	(Mexico) Rebeca Bernal	3	8	11
4	FW	10	(Mexico) Dinora Garza	4	5	9
5	FW	8	(Mexico) Diana Evangelista	2	6	8
5	MF	25	(Mexico) Norali Armenta	0	8	8
7	FW	11	(Mexico) Pamela Verdirame	6	0	6
8	DF	2	(Mexico) Alexia Frías	4	0	4
9	DF	16	(Mexico) Selena Castillo	0	3	3
10	DF	6	(Mexico) Flor Mejía	1	0	1
10	MF	13	(Mexico) Sofía Ochoa	1	0	1
10	MF	18	(Mexico) Gelymar Melo	1	0	1
10	DF	19	(Mexico) Mariana Cadena	0	1	1
10	MF	21	(Mexico) Montserrat Bernal	1	0	1
10	DF	26	(Mexico) Valeria Valdez	0	1	1
10	DF	27	(Mexico) Victoria López	0	1	1
Own goals				0	1	1
Total				38	53	91

=== Hat-tricks ===
Player	Against	Result	Date	Competition	Ref.
(Mexico) Desirée Monsiváis	Santos Laguna	7–0 (H)	28 October 2017	Liga MX Femenil	
(Mexico) Desirée Monsiváis	León	4–2 (A)	26 February 2018	Liga MX Femenil	
(Mexico) Dinora Garza	Querétaro	7–1 (A)	10 March 2018	Liga MX Femenil	
(Mexico) Daniela Solís	Atlas	6–1 (H)	26 March 2018	Liga MX Femenil	

=== Own goals ===
Player	Against	Result	Date	Competition	Ref.
(Mexico) Vanessa López	UANL	2–2 (A)	27 April 2018	Liga MX Femenil	
