= 2020–21 C.D. Guadalajara (women) season =

Guadalajara
2020–21 season
- Chairman: Amaury Vergara
- Manager: Édgar Mejía
- Stadium: Estadio Akron; Verde Valle
- Apertura: Quarterfinals (4th)
- Clausura: Runners-up (2nd)
- Top goalscorer: Alicia Cervantes (31 goals)
- Biggest win: Guadalajara 5–0 Mazatlán (7 September 2020)
- Biggest defeat: Guadalajara 0–3 Atlas (11 October 2020)
Home colours	Away colours

The 2020–21 season is Guadalajara's fourth competitive season and fourth season in the Liga MX Femenil, the top flight of Mexican women's football.

Due to the COVID-19 pandemic, Liga MX Femenil's start was delayed for August 2020.

On 23 July 2020, manager Ramón Villa Zevallos was fired due to differences between him and the club's management, regarding the "players' development". He was replaced by Édgar Mejía, who previously played for Guadalajara and achieved a league championship in 2006.

== Squad ==
=== Apertura ===
No.	Nat.	Name	Date of birth (age)	Since
Goalkeepers
1	(Mexico)	Celeste Espino	9 August 2003 (aged 17)	2019
12	(Mexico)	Blanca Félix	25 March 1996 (aged 24)	2017
25	(Mexico)	María Fernanda Ayala	13 April 1997 (aged 23)	2020
Defenders
2	(Mexico)	Jaqueline Rodríguez	7 September 1996 (aged 23)	2019
3	(Mexico)	Miriam García	14 February 1998 (aged 22)	2017
4	(Mexico)	Janelly Farías	12 February 1990 (aged 30)	2019
13	(Mexico)	Daniela Pulido	29 April 2000 (aged 20)	2017
14	(Mexico)	Andrea Sánchez	31 March 1994 (aged 26)	2017
16	(Mexico)	Priscila Padilla	11 December 1999 (aged 20)	2017
20	(Mexico)	Dayana Madrigal	23 April 2003 (aged 17)	2020
26	(Mexico)	Araceli Torres	15 September 2000 (aged 19)	2018
27	(Mexico)	Kinberly Guzmán	19 September 2002 (aged 17)	2018
35	(Mexico)	Damaris Godínez	22 July 1999 (aged 21)	2018
Midfielders
6	(Mexico)	Miriam Castillo	1 June 1992 (aged 28)	2018
7	(Mexico)	María Sánchez	20 February 1996 (aged 24)	2020
8	(Mexico)	Nicole Pérez	30 August 2001 (aged 18)	2018
10	(Mexico)	Tania Morales (Captain)	22 December 1986 (aged 33)	2017
15	(Mexico)	Carolina Jaramillo	19 March 1994 (aged 26)	2020
18	(Mexico)	Susan Bejarano	7 August 1995 (aged 25)	2017
22	(Mexico)	Isabella Gutiérrez	9 March 2004 (aged 16)	2020
28	(Mexico)	Michelle González	20 July 1995 (aged 25)	2017
30	(Mexico)	Samara Alcalá	27 February 1998 (aged 22)	2019
34	(Mexico)	Victoria Acevedo	16 January 1999 (aged 21)	2017
Forwards
9	(Mexico)	Evelyn González	5 December 1996 (aged 23)	2020
11	(Mexico)	Norma Palafox	14 October 1998 (aged 21)	2017
17	(Mexico)	Joseline Montoya	3 July 2000 (aged 20)	2019
19	(Mexico)	Anette Vázquez	11 March 2002 (aged 18)	2017
23	(Mexico)	Guadalupe Velázquez	25 March 1993 (aged 27)	2017
24	(Mexico)	Alicia Cervantes	24 January 1994 (aged 26)	2020
29	(Mexico)	Gabriela Huerta	12 January 1999 (aged 21)	2018
31	(Mexico)	Lía Romero	27 July 2000 (aged 20)	2017
33	(Mexico)	Yashira Barrientos	29 November 1994 (aged 25)	2019

- Last updated: 13 August 2020
- Source: Liga MX Femenil

== Transfers ==
=== In ===
Pos.	Player	Moving from	Transfer window	Ref.
FW	(Mexico) Alicia Cervantes	Monterrey	Summer	
GK	(Mexico) María Fernanda Ayala	Morelia	Summer	
MF	(Mexico) Carolina Jaramillo	UANL	Summer	

=== Out ===
Pos.	Player	Moving to	Transfer window	Ref.
FW	(Mexico) Rubí Soto	(Spain) Villarreal	Summer	
FW	(Mexico) Norma Palafox	Pachuca	Winter	
MF	(Mexico) Nicole Pérez	Monterrey	Winter	
MF	(Mexico) María Sánchez	UANL	Winter	

== Coaching staff ==
Position	Staff
Manager	(Mexico) Édgar Mejía
Assistant managers	(Mexico) Alejandro González
Assistant managers	(Mexico) Gregorio Sánchez
Fitness coach	(Mexico) Mario Domínguez
Physiotherapist	(Mexico) Miriam López
Team doctors	(Mexico) Karina Martínez
Team doctors	(Mexico) Alejandro Ramírez

== Competitions ==
=== Overview ===
Competition	First match	Last match	Starting round	Final position	Record							
Competition	First match	Last match	Starting round	Final position	Pld	W	D	L	GF	GA	GD	Win %
Apertura	13 August 2020	30 November 2020	Matchday 1	Quarterfinals	19	12	3	4	44	20	+24	63.16
Clausura	11 January 2021	31 May 2021	Final	Runner-ups	23	14	4	5	57	24	+33	60.87
Total					42	26	7	9	101	44	+57	61.90

Source: Competitions

=== Torneo Apertura ===
==== League table ====
Pos	Team	Pld	W	D	L	GF	GA	GD	Pts	Qualification or relegation
2	Atlas	17	13	2	2	45	18	+27	41	Advance to Liguilla (Note: The first 8 places in the table qualify for the Liguilla. The last ranked team in the relegation table can qualify for the liguilla in the Apertura tournament.)
3	Monterrey	17	13	2	2	41	19	+22	41	Advance to Liguilla
4	Guadalajara	17	12	2	3	42	17	+25	38	Advance to Liguilla
5	América	17	11	4	2	35	12	+23	37	Advance to Liguilla
6	UNAM	17	8	3	6	25	15	+10	27	Advance to Liguilla

Updated to match(es) played on 20 November 2020. Source: Liga MX Femenil
Rules for classification: 1) Points; 2) Goal difference; 3) Number of goals scored; 4) Head-to-head results between tied teams; 5) Number of goals scored away; 6) Highest relegation coefficient; 7) Fair Play points

==== Matches ====
13 August 2020 1	Juárez	0–4	Guadalajara	Ciudad Juárez, Chihuahua
17:00 (UTC−6)		Report	Sosa 15' (o.g.); M. González 19'; Cervantes 34', 49'	Stadium: Estadio Olímpico Benito Juárez; Referee: Yonatan Peinado

23 August 2020 2	Guadalajara	2–0	Necaxa	Zapopan, Jalisco
10:00	Cervantes 12'; Pérez 20'	Report		Stadium: Verde Valle; Referee: Francia González

27 August 2020 3	Toluca	1–4	Guadalajara	Metepec, State of Mexico
16:00	Román 40'	Report	Cervantes 17'; Montoya 56'; Pérez 68'; M. Sánchez 88'	Stadium: Instalaciones Metepec; Referee: Lucila Venegas

7 September 2020 4	Guadalajara	5–0	Mazatlán	Zapopan, Jalisco
19:00	Cervantes 9' (pen.), 24', 45+3'; Palafox 22'; Jaramillo 62'	Report		Stadium: Estadio Akron; Referee: Salvador Pérez

14 September 2020 5	Santos Laguna	0–0	Guadalajara	Torreón, Coahuila
19:00		Report		Stadium: Estadio Corona; Referee: Juan Francisco Sánchez

17 September 2020 6	Guadalajara	2–0	Cruz Azul	Zapopan, Jalisco
19:00	Jaramillo 36'; Palafox 74'	Report		Stadium: Estadio Akron; Referee: Karen Hernández

20 September 2020 7	UNAM	1–2	Guadalajara	Coyoacán, Mexico City
9:30	García 41'	Report	Cervantes 3'; Pérez 59' (pen.)	Stadium: La Cantera; Referee: Lucila Venegas

28 September 2020 8	Guadalajara	3–1	Querétaro	Zapopan, Jalisco
17:00	Barrientos 37'; M. Sánchez 65', 69'	Report	Miranda 78'	Stadium: Estadio Akron; Referee: Katia García

5 October 2020 9	Monterrey	2–4	Guadalajara	Guadalupe, Nuevo León
21:00	Solís 20'; Avilez 90+2'	Report	Cervantes 25', 47'; M. Sánchez 37'; Palafox 63'	Stadium: Estadio BBVA Bancomer; Referee: Diana Pérez

11 October 2020 10	Guadalajara	0–3	Atlas	Zapopan, Jalisco
21:00		Report	García 19'; González 51' (pen.); Robles 55'	Stadium: Estadio Akron; Referee: Priscila Pérez

14 October 2020 11	León	0–2	Guadalajara	León, Guanajuato
16:00		Report	Jaramillo 54' (pen.); Palafox 74'	Stadium: Casa Club León; Referee: Lucila Venegas

18 October 2020 12	San Luis	2–2	Guadalajara	San Luis Potosí City, San Luis Potosí
17:00	Kasis 11'; Montoya 87'	Report	García 15'; Jaramillo 60'	Stadium: Estadio Alfonso Lastras; Referee: Lizzet García

2 November 2020 13	Guadalajara	2–1	Pachuca	Zapopan, Jalisco
17:00	Montoya 8'; Jaramillo 12'	Report	Nieto 16'	Stadium: Estadio Akron; Referee: Diana Pérez

5 November 2020 14	Guadalajara	3–0	Tijuana	Zapopan, Jalisco
10:30	Cervantes 52', 65'; Palafox 88'	Report		Stadium: Estadio Akron; Referee: Lucila Venegas

8 November 2020 15	Puebla	0–5	Guadalajara	Puebla City, Puebla
12:00		Report	Pérez 13', 43'; Jaramillo 32'; Vázquez 64'; M. Sánchez 90' (pen.)	Stadium: Estadio Cuauhtémoc; Referee: Katia García

16 November 2020 16	Guadalajara	1–2	América	Zapopan, Jalisco
19:00	M. Sánchez 78'	Report	Espinosa 26' (pen.), 28'	Stadium: Estadio Akron; Referee: Karen Hernández

20 November 2020 17	UANL	4–1	Guadalajara	San Nicolás de los Garza, Nuevo León
18:00	Mayor 13'; Cruz 66'; Martínez 88', 90+3'	Report	Pérez 79' (pen.)	Stadium: Estadio Universitario; Referee: Priscila Pérez

==== Playoffs ====
===== Quarterfinals =====
27 November 2020 First leg	América	1–0	Guadalajara	Coyoacán, Mexico City
12:00	Cuevas 78'	Report		Stadium: Club América; Referee: Francia González

30 November 2020 Second leg	Guadalajara	2–2 (2–3 agg.)	América	Zapopan, Jalisco
17:00	Cervantes 74'; Gutiérrez 84'	Report	Campa 59'; González 66'	Stadium: Estadio Akron; Referee: Katia García

=== Torneo Clausura ===
==== League table ====
Pos	Team	Pld	W	D	L	GF	GA	GD	Pts	Qualification or relegation
1	UANL	17	12	4	1	39	12	+27	40	Advance to Liguilla (Note: The first 8 places in the table qualify for the Liguilla. The last ranked team in the relegation table can qualify for the liguilla in the Apertura tournament.)
2	Guadalajara	17	11	3	3	44	19	+25	36	Advance to Liguilla
3	Atlas	17	10	4	3	30	23	+7	34	Advance to Liguilla
4	Monterrey	17	10	3	4	40	22	+18	33	Advance to Liguilla
5	UNAM	17	9	5	3	24	17	+7	32	Advance to Liguilla

Updated to match(es) played on 3 May 2021. Source: Liga MX Femenil
Rules for classification: 1) Points; 2) Goal difference; 3) Number of goals scored; 4) Head-to-head results between tied teams; 5) Number of goals scored away; 6) Highest relegation coefficient; 7) Fair Play points

==== Matches ====
11 January 2021 1	Guadalajara	2–0	Juárez	Zapopan, Jalisco
19:00	Montoya 83'	Report	Sosa 40' (o.g.)	Stadium: Estadio Akron; Attendance: 0 Referee: Lucila Venegas

16 January 2021 2	Mazatlán	1–2	Guadalajara	Mazatlán, Sinaloa
9:00 (UTC−7)	Montero 20'	Report	Cervantes 40'; Jaramillo 67' (pen.)	Stadium: Estadio de Mazatlán; Attendance: 0 Referee: Karen Hernández

25 January 2021 3	Guadalajara	2–0	Santos Laguna	Zapopan, Jalisco
17:00	Montoya 31'; Vázquez 67'	Report		Stadium: Estadio Akron; Attendance: 0 Referee: Katia García

1 February 2021 4	Pachuca	1–0	Guadalajara	Pachuca, Hidalgo
17:00	Ocampo 88'	Report		Stadium: Estadio Hidalgo; Attendance: 0 Referee: Diana Pérez

5 February 2021 5	Querétaro	3–3	Guadalajara	Querétaro City, Querétaro
17:00	Servín 36'; Santana 46'; Rodríguez 70' (pen.)	Report	Montoya 4'; Cervantes 22'; Gutiérrez 23'	Stadium: Estadio Corregidora; Attendance: 0 Referee: Priscila Pérez

8 February 2021 6	Guadalajara	3–0	Atlético San Luis	Zapopan, Jalisco
17:00	Castillo 35'; Cervantes 57'; Vázquez 62'	Report		Stadium: Estadio Akron; Attendance: 0 Referee: Martín Juárez

12 February 2021 7	Necaxa	0–2	Guadalajara	Aguascalientes City, Aguascalientes
16:00		Report	Cervantes 30'; Gutiérrez 63'	Stadium: Estadio Victoria; Attendance: 0 Referee: Felipe Moreno

28 February 2021 8	Guadalajara	5–1	León	Zapopan, Jalisco
11:15	Cervantes 10', 40' (pen.), 71'; Gutiérrez 42'; Vázquez 73'	Report	Calderón 80'	Stadium: Verde Valle; Referee: Salvador Pérez

8 March 2021 9	Tijuana	2–1	Guadalajara	Tijuana, Baja California
17:00 (UTC−7)	Cuéllar 44'; Aguiar 56'	Report	Hernández 46' (o.g.)	Stadium: Estadio Caliente; Attendance: 0 Referee: Katia García

11 March 2021 10	Guadalajara	1–1	Toluca	Zapopan, Jalisco
21:00	Cervantes 90+1'	Report	Tovar 65'	Stadium: Estadio Akron; Attendance: 0 Referee: Martín Juárez

14 March 2021 11	Atlas	3–3	Guadalajara	Las Pintitas, Jalisco
10:00	P. García 16', 58'; A. García 52'	Report	Jaramillo 41'; Cervantes 47', 55'	Stadium: Centro de Capacitación de Fútbol; Referee: Francia González

21 March 2021 12	Guadalajara	3–0	Puebla	Zapopan, Jalisco
10:00	Cervantes 36', 38', 83'	Report		Stadium: Verde Valle; Referee: Lucila Venegas

27 March 2021 13	América	2–4	Guadalajara	Tlalpan, Mexico City
20:05	Farías 42'; Gutiérrez 90'	Report	Jaramillo 10'; Cervantes 33', 61'; Castillo 83'	Stadium: Estadio Azteca; Attendance: 0 Referee: Lizzet García

3 April 2021 14	Guadalajara	4–1	UNAM	Zapopan, Jalisco
10:00	Cervantes 52'; Montoya 65'; Rodríguez 76'; Villeda 84' (o.g.)	Report	Campa 67'	Stadium: Verde Valle; Referee: Diana Pérez

16 April 2021 15	Cruz Azul	0–1	Guadalajara	Xochimilco, Mexico City
16:00		Report	Jaramillo 87' (pen.)	Stadium: La Noria; Referee: Priscila Pérez

26 April 2021 16	Guadalajara	5–0	Monterrey	Zapopan, Jalisco
17:00	Gutiérrez 51'; Jaramillo 52'; Montoya 60' (pen.), 67', 90+1'	Report		Stadium: Estadio Akron; Attendance: 0 Referee: Francia González

==== Playoffs ====
===== Quarterfinals =====
7 May 2021 First leg	Toluca	0–1	Guadalajara	Metepec, State of Mexico
16:00		Report	Vázquez 45+1'	Stadium: Instalaciones Metepec; Referee: Katia García

10 May 2021 Second leg	Guadalajara	3–0 (4–0 agg.)	Toluca	Zapopan, Jalisco
18:00	Cervantes 50', 81'; Valenzuela 86'	Report		Stadium: Estadio Akron; Attendance: 0 Referee: Karen Hernández

===== Semifinals =====
14 May 2021 First leg	Atlas	0–0	Guadalajara	Guadalajara, Jalisco
17:00		Report		Stadium: Estadio Jalisco; Referee: Lucila Venegas

17 May 2021 Second leg	Guadalajara	2–1 (2–1 agg.)	Atlas	Zapopan, Jalisco
21:00	Castillo 45+1'; García 71' (o.g.)	Report	González 90+4' (pen.)	Stadium: Estadio Akron; Referee: Lizzet García

===== Final =====
24 May 2021 First leg	Guadalajara	1–2	UANL	Zapopan, Jalisco
21:00	Vázquez 50'	Report	Mayor 13'	Stadium: Estadio Akron; Referee: Lizzet García

31 May 2021 Second leg	UANL	5–3 (7–4 agg.)	Guadalajara	San Nicolás de los Garza, Nuevo León
19:00	Ovalle 7', 12'; Mayor 14', 90'; Solís 89'	Report	García 40'; Jaramillo 57'; Valenzuela 90+4'	Stadium: Estadio Universitario; Referee: Karen Hernández

== Statistics ==
=== Goalscorers ===
Rank	Pos.	No.	Player	Apertura	Clausura	Total
1	FW	28	(Mexico) Alicia Cervantes	13	18	31
2	MF	15	(Mexico) Carolina Jaramillo	6	5	11
3	FW	17	(Mexico) Joseline Montoya	2	7	9
4	MF	7	(Mexico) María Sánchez	6	–	6
4	MF	8	(Mexico) Nicole Pérez	6	–	6
6	FW	19	(Mexico) Anette Vázquez	1	4	5
6	MF	22	(Mexico) Isabella Gutiérrez	1	4	5
8	FW	11	(Mexico) Norma Palafox	4	–	4
9	MF	6	(Mexico) Miriam Castillo	0	3	3
10	DF	2	(Mexico) Jaqueline Rodríguez	0	1	1
10	DF	3	(Mexico) Miriam García	1	0	1
10	DF	23	(Mexico) Gabriela Valenzuela	0	1	1
10	FW	24	(Mexico) Michelle González	1	0	1
10	FW	33	(Mexico) Yashira Barrientos	1	0	1
10	MF	34	(Mexico) Victoria Acevedo	1	0	1
Own goals				1	4	5
Total				44	47	91

=== Hat-tricks ===
Player	Against	Result	Date	Competition	Ref.
(Mexico) Alicia Cervantes	León	5–1 (H)	28 February 2021	Liga MX Femenil	
(Mexico) Alicia Cervantes	Puebla	3–0 (H)	21 March 2021	Liga MX Femenil	
(Mexico) Joseline Montoya	Monterrey	5–0 (H)	26 April 2021	Liga MX Femenil	
