= 2019–20 C.D. Guadalajara (women) season =

Guadalajara
2019–20 season
- Chairman: Amaury Vergara
- Manager: Ramón Villa Zevallos
- Stadium: Estadio Akron; Verde Valle
- Apertura: Quarterfinals (5th)
- Clausura: 3rd (canceled)
- Top goalscorer: Yashira Barrientos (9 goals)
- Biggest win: Tijuana 1–4 Guadalajara (17 February 2020)
- Biggest defeat: Monterrey 3–1 Guadalajara (28 October 2019)
Home colours	Away colours

The 2019–20 season was Guadalajara's third competitive season and third season in the Liga MX Femenil, the top flight of Mexican women's football.

The season started under a new manager, Ramón Villa Zevallos, who won the Clausura 2019 tournament with Tigres UANL.

Guadalajara finished fifth on the Apertura tournament, qualifying for the playoffs; but were eliminated right away on quarterfinals by rivals América.

Guadalajara started the new tournament with a positive balance. Nevertheless, on 22 May 2020, the Clausura tournament was canceled due to the COVID-19 pandemic; in that moment Guadalajara was ranked third.

== Squad ==
=== Apertura ===
No.	Nat.	Name	Date of birth (age)	Since
Goalkeepers
1	(Mexico)	Celeste Espino	9 August 2003 (aged 15)	2019
12	(Mexico)	Blanca Félix (Vice-captain)	25 March 1996 (aged 23)	2017
21	(Mexico)	Ana Paula Ruvalcaba	24 August 2001 (aged 17)	2017
Defenders
2	(Mexico)	Jaqueline Rodríguez	7 September 1996 (aged 22)	2019
3	(Mexico)	Miriam García	14 February 1998 (aged 21)	2017
4	(Mexico)	Janelly Farías	12 February 1990 (aged 29)	2019
5	(Mexico)	Melissa Sosa	21 January 1993 (aged 26)	2019
13	(Mexico)	Daniela Pulido	29 April 2000 (aged 19)	2017
14	(Mexico)	Andrea Sánchez	31 March 1994 (aged 25)	2017
16	(Mexico)	Priscila Padilla	11 December 1999 (aged 19)	2017
20	(Mexico)	Vanessa Sánchez	14 March 1995 (aged 24)	2017
26	(Mexico)	Araceli Torres	15 September 2000 (aged 18)	2018
27	(Mexico)	Kinberly Guzmán	19 September 2002 (aged 16)	2018
32	(Mexico)	Esmeralda Zamarrón	23 July 2001 (aged 17)	2018
35	(Mexico)	Damaris Godínez	22 July 1999 (aged 19)	2018
Midfielders
6	(Mexico)	Miriam Castillo	1 June 1992 (aged 27)	2018
8	(Mexico)	Nicole Pérez	30 August 2001 (aged 17)	2018
10	(Mexico)	Tania Morales (Captain)	22 December 1986 (aged 32)	2017
18	(Mexico)	Susan Bejarano	7 August 1995 (aged 23)	2017
25	(Mexico)	Yazmín Álvarez	7 April 1996 (aged 23)	2017
30	(Mexico)	Samara Alcalá	27 February 1998 (aged 21)	2019
34	(Mexico)	Victoria Acevedo	16 January 1999 (aged 20)	2017
Forwards
15	(Mexico)	Rubí Soto	14 October 1995 (aged 23)	2018
17	(Mexico)	Joseline Montoya	3 July 2000 (aged 19)	2019
19	(Mexico)	Anette Vázquez	11 March 2002 (aged 17)	2017
22	(Mexico)	Brenda Viramontes	24 April 1995 (aged 24)	2017
23	(Mexico)	María Velázquez	25 March 1993 (aged 26)	2017
24	(Mexico)	Itzia Tenahua	6 June 1999 (aged 20)	2019
29	(Mexico)	Gabriela Huerta	12 January 1999 (aged 20)	2018
31	(Mexico)	Lía Romero	27 July 2000 (aged 18)	2017
33	(Mexico)	Yashira Barrientos	29 November 1994 (aged 24)	2019

=== Clausura ===
No.	Nat.	Name	Date of birth (age)	Since
Goalkeepers
1	(Mexico)	Celeste Espino	9 August 2003 (aged 16)	2019
12	(Mexico)	Blanca Félix (Vice-captain)	25 March 1996 (aged 23)	2017
21	(Mexico)	Ana Paula Ruvalcaba	24 August 2001 (aged 18)	2017
Defenders
2	(Mexico)	Jaqueline Rodríguez	7 September 1996 (aged 23)	2019
3	(Mexico)	Miriam García	14 February 1998 (aged 21)	2017
4	(Mexico)	Janelly Farías	12 February 1990 (aged 29)	2019
13	(Mexico)	Daniela Pulido	29 April 2000 (aged 19)	2017
14	(Mexico)	Andrea Sánchez	31 March 1994 (aged 25)	2017
16	(Mexico)	Priscila Padilla	11 December 1999 (aged 20)	2017
26	(Mexico)	Araceli Torres	15 September 2000 (aged 19)	2018
27	(Mexico)	Kinberly Guzmán	19 September 2002 (aged 17)	2018
35	(Mexico)	Damaris Godínez	22 July 1999 (aged 20)	2018
Midfielders
6	(Mexico)	Miriam Castillo	1 June 1992 (aged 27)	2018
7	(Mexico)	María Sánchez	20 February 1996 (aged 23)	2020
8	(Mexico)	Nicole Pérez	30 August 2001 (aged 18)	2018
10	(Mexico)	Tania Morales (Captain)	22 December 1986 (aged 33)	2017
18	(Mexico)	Susan Bejarano	7 August 1995 (aged 24)	2017
22	(Mexico)	Isabella Gutiérrez	9 March 2004 (aged 15)	2020
30	(Mexico)	Samara Alcalá	27 February 1998 (aged 21)	2019
34	(Mexico)	Victoria Acevedo	16 January 1999 (aged 20)	2017
Forwards
9	(Mexico)	Evelyn González	5 December 1996 (aged 23)	2020
11	(Mexico)	Norma Palafox	14 October 1998 (aged 21)	2017
15	(Mexico)	Rubí Soto	14 October 1995 (aged 24)	2018
17	(Mexico)	Joseline Montoya	3 July 2000 (aged 19)	2019
23	(Mexico)	María Velázquez	25 March 1993 (aged 26)	2017
31	(Mexico)	Lía Romero	27 July 2000 (aged 19)	2017
33	(Mexico)	Yashira Barrientos	29 November 1994 (aged 25)	2019

== Transfers ==
=== In ===
Pos.	Player	Moving from	Transfer window	Ref.
DF	(Mexico) Melissa Sosa	Santos Laguna	Summer	
FW	(Mexico) Itzia Tenahua	BUAP	Summer	
DF	(Mexico) Janelly Farías	(United States) LA Galaxy OC	Summer	
DF	(Mexico) Damaris Godínez	Puebla	Summer	
DF	(Mexico) Jaqueline Rodríguez	Aztecas UDLAP	Summer	
MF	(Mexico) María Sánchez	(United States) Chicago Red Stars	Winter	
FW	(Mexico) Evelyn González	UANL	Winter	

=== Out ===
Pos.	Player	Moving to	Transfer window	Ref.
DF	(Mexico) Arlett Tovar	Santos Laguna	Summer	
DF	(Mexico) Melissa Sosa	Juárez	Winter	
FW	(Mexico) Brenda Viramontes	UANL	Winter	
DF	(Mexico) Esmeralda Zamarrón	Santos Laguna	Winter	
MF	(Mexico) Yazmín Álvarez	León	Winter	
FW	(Mexico) Itzia Tenahua	León	Winter	
DF	(Mexico) Vanessa Sánchez	León	Winter	

== Coaching staff ==
Position	Staff
Manager	(Mexico) Ramón Villa Zevallos
Assistant manager	(Mexico) Alejandro González
Assistant manager	(Mexico) Gregorio Sánchez
Fitness coach	(Mexico) Mario Domínguez
Doctor	(Mexico) Karina Martínez
Medical assistant	(Mexico) Miriam López

== Competitions ==
=== Overview ===
Competition	First match	Last match	Starting round	Final position	Record							
Competition	First match	Last match	Starting round	Final position	Pld	W	D	L	GF	GA	GD	Win %
Apertura	15 July 2019	18 November 2019	Matchday 1	Quarterfinals (5th)	20	9	4	7	30	26	+4	45.00
Clausura	6 January 2020	15 March 2020	Matchday 1	3rd	10	5	3	2	16	10	+6	50.00
Total					30	14	7	9	46	36	+10	46.67

Source: Competitions

=== Torneo Apertura ===
==== League table ====
Pos	Team	Pld	W	D	L	GF	GA	GD	Pts	Qualification or relegation
3	Pachuca	18	11	3	4	42	24	+18	36	Advance to Liguilla (Note: The first 8 places in the table qualify for the Liguilla. The last ranked team in the relegation table can qualify for the liguilla in the Apertura tournament.)
4	América	18	9	5	4	29	17	+12	32	Advance to Liguilla
5	Guadalajara	18	9	4	5	30	23	+7	31	Advance to Liguilla
6	Toluca	18	9	4	5	24	20	+4	31	Advance to Liguilla
7	Tijuana	18	8	5	5	27	21	+6	29	Advance to Liguilla

Updated to match(es) played on 11 November 2019. Source: Liga MX Femenil
Rules for classification: 1) Points; 2) Goal difference; 3) Number of goals scored; 4) Head-to-head results between tied teams; 5) Number of goals scored away; 6) Highest relegation coefficient; 7) Fair Play points

==== Matches ====
15 July 2019 1	UANL	2–1	Guadalajara	San Nicolás de los Garza, Nuevo León
20:00	Martínez 21'; Cruz 33'	Report	Castillo 90'	Stadium: Estadio Universitario; Referee: Oscar Eduardo Peña

22 July 2019 2	Guadalajara	2–1	Atlético San Luis	Zapopan, Jalisco
19:00	Pérez 33'; Morales 72'	Report	Izaguirre 27'	Stadium: Estadio Akron; Referee: Karen Hernández

26 July 2019 3	Necaxa	0–3	Guadalajara	Aguascalientes City, Aguascalientes
16:00		Report	Montoya 39'; Viramontes 56'; Soto 59'	Stadium: Estadio Victoria; Referee: Quetzalli Alvarado

4 August 2019 4	Guadalajara	1–0	Puebla	Zapopan, Jalisco
12:00	Farías 42'	Report		Stadium: Verde Valle; Referee: Francia González

12 August 2019 5	León	2–1	Guadalajara	León, Guanajuato
19:00	Muñoz 43', 75'	Report	Soto 36'	Stadium: Estadio León; Referee: Katia García

19 August 2019 6	Guadalajara	0–1	Tijuana	Zapopan, Jalisco
19:00		Report	Orejel 28'	Stadium: Estadio Akron; Referee: Diana Pérez

26 August 2019 8	Guadalajara	1–0	Juárez	Zapopan, Jalisco
21:00	Guzmán 57'	Report		Stadium: Estadio Akron; Referee: Lizzet García

6 September 2019 9	Cruz Azul	3–3	Guadalajara	Ciudad Cooperativa, Hidalgo
16:00	León 72', 87'; Enciso 82'	Report	Soto 37'; Pérez 40'; Morales 55'	Stadium: Estadio 10 de Diciembre; Referee: Karen Hernández

16 September 2019 10	Guadalajara	4–2	América	Zapopan, Jalisco
19:00	Rodríguez 36'; Morales 42'; Castillo 47'; Montoya 54'	Report	Espinosa 63', 64'	Stadium: Estadio Akron; Referee: Katia García

19 September 2019 11	Guadalajara	2–1	Querétaro	Zapopan, Jalisco
21:00	Barrientos 30'; Farías 62'	Report	Vázquez 40'	Stadium: Estadio Akron; Referee: Diana Pérez

23 September 2019 12	Toluca	1–2	Guadalajara	Toluca, State of Mexico
18:00	Saavedra 23'	Report	Barrientos 17'; Rodríguez 54'	Stadium: Estadio Nemesio Díez; Referee: Francia González

30 September 2019 13	Veracruz	1–1	Guadalajara	Boca del Río, Veracruz
17:00	Montero 48'	Report	Montoya 45+1'	Stadium: Estadio Luis "Pirata" Fuente; Referee: José Ángel Rodríguez

13 October 2019 14	Guadalajara	2–3	Santos Laguna	Zapopan, Jalisco
12:00	Pérez 41'; Velázquez 82'	Report	Gómez 1', 14', 43'	Stadium: Verde Valle; Referee: Erick García

19 October 2019 15	Atlas	1–1	Guadalajara	Zapopan, Jalisco
11:00	Iturbide 56'	Report	Pérez 1'	Stadium: Estadio Alfredo "Pistache" Torres; Referee: Diana Pérez

24 October 2019 16	Guadalajara	2–0	Morelia	Zapopan, Jalisco
21:00	Barrientos 1', 46'	Report		Stadium: Estadio Akron; Referee: Francia González

28 October 2019 17	Monterrey	3–1	Guadalajara	Guadalupe, Nuevo León
21:00	Solís 11', 18'; Monsiváis 64'	Report	Huerta 44'	Stadium: Estadio BBVA Bancomer; Referee: Karla García

3 November 2019 18	Guadalajara	1–1	UNAM	Zapopan, Jalisco
10:00	Soto 72'	Report	Herrera 6'	Stadium: Verde Valle; Referee: Priscila Pérez

11 November 2019 19	Pachuca	1–2	Guadalajara	Pachuca, Hidalgo
19:00	Rodríguez 90+3' (pen.)	Report	Soto 56'; Sánchez 73'	Stadium: Estadio Hidalgo; Referee: Ismael López

==== Playoffs ====
===== Quarterfinals =====
15 November 2019 First leg	Guadalajara	0–2	América	Zapopan, Jalisco
21:06		Report	Espinosa 1'; Muñoz 26'	Stadium: Estadio Akron; Referee: Priscila Pérez

18 November 2019 Second leg	América	1–0 (3–0 agg.)	Guadalajara	Coyoacán, Mexico City
15:45	Espinosa 39'	Report		Stadium: Club América; Referee: Karla García

=== Torneo Clausura ===
==== League table ====
Pos	Team	Pld	W	D	L	GF	GA	GD	Pts
1	UANL	8	7	1	0	22	5	+17	22
2	Atlas	9	7	1	1	18	7	+11	22
3	Guadalajara	10	5	3	2	16	10	+6	18
4	Monterrey	8	5	2	1	15	9	+6	17
5	América	9	5	2	2	16	11	+5	17

Updated to match(es) played on 15 March 2020. Source: Liga MX Femenil
Rules for classification: 1) Points; 2) Goal difference; 3) Number of goals scored; 4) Head-to-head results between tied teams; 5) Number of goals scored away; 6) Highest relegation coefficient; 7) Fair Play points

==== Matches ====
6 January 2020 1	Guadalajara	2–2	Cruz Azul	Zapopan, Jalisco
21:00	Morales 33'; González 46'	Report	Jiménez 7'; Curiel 47'	Stadium: Estadio Akron; Referee: Jaime Montes

10 January 2020 2	Juárez	0–0	Guadalajara	Ciudad Juárez, Chihuahua
20:00		Report		Stadium: Estadio Olímpico Benito Juárez; Referee: Mauricio López

20 January 2020 3	Guadalajara	4–3	León	Zapopan, Jalisco
19:00	Barrientos 17', 55'; García 76'; Soto 89'	Report	García 54'; Cid 65'; de la Rosa 87'	Stadium: Estadio Akron; Referee: Diana Pérez

27 January 2020 4	Atlético San Luis	0–2	Guadalajara	San Luis Potosí City, San Luis Potosí
20:00		Report	Barrientos 49'; Velázquez 90+2'	Stadium: Estadio Alfonso Lastras; Referee: Lizzet García

3 February 2020 5	Guadalajara	0–1	Pachuca	Zapopan, Jalisco
19:00		Report	Salazar 52'	Stadium: Estadio Akron; Referee: Priscila Pérez

10 February 2020 6	Santos Laguna	1–1	Guadalajara	Torreón, Coahuila
21:00	Zamarrón 36'	Report	Soto 24'	Stadium: Estadio Corona; Referee: Karen Hernández

17 February 2020 7	Tijuana	1–4	Guadalajara	Tijuana, Baja California
19:00	Cuevas 7'	Report	Farías 8'; González 11'; Barrientos 31'; Morales 60'	Stadium: Estadio Caliente; Referee: José Roberto González

24 February 2020 8	Guadalajara	0–2	Atlas	Zapopan, Jalisco
19:00		Report	García 73'; Iturbide 75'	Stadium: Estadio Akron; Referee: Francia González

1 March 2020 9	Puebla	0–1	Guadalajara	Puebla City, Puebla
12:00		Report	García 63'	Stadium: Estadio Cuauhtémoc; Referee: Hugo Alberto González

15 March 2020 10	Guadalajara	2–0	Toluca	Zapopan, Jalisco
12:00	Soto 31'; Barrientos 79'	Report		Stadium: Verde Valle; Referee: Lucila Venegas

11	Morelia	Canceled	Guadalajara	Morelia, Michoacán
				Stadium: Estadio Morelos
Note: On 22 May 2020, the Clausura tournament was canceled due to the COVID-19 pandemic.

12	Guadalajara	Canceled	Necaxa	Zapopan, Jalisco
				Stadium: Verde Valle
Note: On 22 May 2020, the Clausura tournament was canceled due to the COVID-19 pandemic.

13	América	Canceled	Guadalajara	Tlalpan, Mexico City
				Stadium: Estadio Azteca
Note: On 22 May 2020, the Clausura tournament was canceled due to the COVID-19 pandemic.

14	Guadalajara	Canceled	UANL	Zapopan, Jalisco
				Stadium: Estadio Akron
Note: On 22 May 2020, the Clausura tournament was canceled due to the COVID-19 pandemic.

15	UNAM	Canceled	Guadalajara	Coyoacán, Mexico City
				Stadium: La Cantera
Note: On 22 May 2020, the Clausura tournament was canceled due to the COVID-19 pandemic.

16	Querétaro	Canceled	Guadalajara	Querétaro City, Querétaro
				Stadium: Estadio Corregidora
Note: On 22 May 2020, the Clausura tournament was canceled due to the COVID-19 pandemic.

17	Guadalajara	Canceled	Monterrey	Zapopan, Jalisco
				Stadium: Estadio Akron
Note: On 22 May 2020, the Clausura tournament was canceled due to the COVID-19 pandemic.

== Statistics ==
=== Appearances and goals ===
No.	Pos	Nat	Player	Total		Apertura		Clausura	
No.	Pos	Nat	Player	Apps	Goals	Apps	Goals	Apps	Goals
2	DF	(Mexico) MEX	Jaqueline Rodríguez	23	2	19	2	4	0
3	DF	(Mexico) MEX	Miriam García	12	2	4	0	8	2
4	DF	(Mexico) MEX	Janelly Farías	21	3	18	2	3	1
6	MF	(Mexico) MEX	Miriam Castillo	29	2	20	2	9	0
7	MF	(Mexico) MEX	María Sánchez	4	0	0	0	4	0
8	MF	(Mexico) MEX	Nicole Pérez	24	4	20	4	4	0
9	FW	(Mexico) MEX	Evelyn González	10	2	0	0	10	2
10	MF	(Mexico) MEX	Tania Morales	25	5	18	3	7	2
11	FW	(Mexico) MEX	Norma Palafox	10	0	0	0	10	0
12	GK	(Mexico) MEX	Blanca Félix	29	0	19	0	10	0
13	DF	(Mexico) MEX	Daniela Pulido	5	0	3	0	2	0
14	DF	(Mexico) MEX	Andrea Sánchez	23	1	13	1	10	0
15	FW	(Mexico) MEX	Rubí Soto	27	8	17	5	10	3
16	MF	(Mexico) MEX	Priscila Padilla	6	0	1	0	5	0
17	FW	(Mexico) MEX	Joseline Montoya	24	3	20	3	4	0
18	MF	(Mexico) MEX	Susan Bejarano	11	0	5	0	6	0
21	MF	(Mexico) MEX	Ana Paula Rubalcava	1	0	1	0	0	0
22	MF	(Mexico) MEX	Isabella Gutiérrez	3	0	0	0	3	0
23	FW	(Mexico) MEX	María Velázquez	11	2	6	1	5	1
26	DF	(Mexico) MEX	Araceli Torres	10	0	10	0	0	0
27	DF	(Mexico) MEX	Kinberly Guzmán	15	1	11	1	4	0
29	FW	(Mexico) MEX	Gabriela Huerta	11	1	11	1	0	0
30	MF	(Mexico) MEX	Samara Alcalá	6	0	5	0	1	0
31	FW	(Mexico) MEX	Lía Romero	4	0	2	0	2	0
33	FW	(Mexico) MEX	Yashira Barrientos	25	9	16	4	9	5
34	MF	(Mexico) MEX	Victoria Acevedo	4	0	2	0	2	0
35	DF	(Mexico) MEX	Damaris Godínez	9	0	4	0	5	0
Players that left the club during the season
5	DF	(Mexico) MEX	Melissa Sosa	10	0	10	0	0	0
20	DF	(Mexico) MEX	Vanessa Sánchez	1	0	1	0	0	0
22	FW	(Mexico) MEX	Brenda Viramontes	15	1	15	1	0	0
24	FW	(Mexico) MEX	Itzia Tenahua	1	0	1	0	0	0
25	MF	(Mexico) MEX	Yazmín Álvarez	1	0	1	0	0	0
32	DF	(Mexico) MEX	Esmeralda Zamarrón	1	0	1	0	0	0

=== Goalscorers ===
Rank	Pos.	No.	Player	Apertura	Clausura	Total
1	FW	33	(Mexico) Yashira Barrientos	4	5	9
2	FW	15	(Mexico) Rubí Soto	5	3	8
3	MF	10	(Mexico) Tania Morales	3	2	5
4	MF	8	(Mexico) Nicole Pérez	4	0	4
5	DF	4	(Mexico) Janelly Farías	2	1	3
5	FW	17	(Mexico) Joseline Montoya	3	0	3
7	DF	2	(Mexico) Jaqueline Rodríguez	2	0	2
7	DF	3	(Mexico) Miriam García	0	2	2
7	MF	6	(Mexico) Miriam Castillo	2	0	2
7	FW	9	(Mexico) Evelyn González	0	2	2
7	FW	23	(Mexico) María Velázquez	1	1	2
11	DF	14	(Mexico) Andrea Sánchez	1	0	1
11	FW	22	(Mexico) Brenda Viramontes	1	0	1
11	DF	27	(Mexico) Kinberly Guzmán	1	0	1
11	FW	29	(Mexico) Gabriela Huerta	1	0	1
Total				30	16	46
