= Michelle González =

Michelle González may refer to:

- Michelle González (basketball), Puerto Rican basketball player
- Michelle González (footballer), Mexican footballer
