= Victoria López =

Victoria López may refer to:

- Vicky López (Victoria López Serrano Felix, born 2006), Spanish footballer
- Victoria López (Mexican footballer) (Victoria López Quiñonez, born 2001), Mexican footballer
