= Football at the 2013 Summer Universiade – Women's tournament =

Women's football at the XXVII Summer Universiade
- Venue: various
- Dates: 5–16 July

Medalists
1st place, gold medalist(s)		Great Britain (GBR)
2nd place, silver medalist(s)		Mexico (MEX)
3rd place, bronze medalist(s)		Brazil (BRA)

The women's tournament of football at the 2013 Summer Universiade was held from 5 to 16 July in Kazan, Russia.

== Preliminary round ==
=== Group A ===
Team	Pld	W	D	L	GF	GA	GD	Pts
Chinese Taipei	3	2	0	1	5	4	+1	6
South Korea	3	1	1	1	6	5	+1	4
South Africa	3	1	1	1	5	5	0	4
Russia	3	1	0	2	2	4	−2	3

Source: Kazan 2013
5 July 2013
17:00

Russia	1–0	South Africa
Sinyutina 10'	Report

Rubin Stadium
Referee: Francia González (Mexico)
5 July 2013
17:00

South Korea	1–2	Chinese Taipei
Jang Sel-gi 36'	Report	Lin Ya-hui 46'; Yang Ya-han 69'

Trudovye Rezervy Stadium
Referee: Michelle O'Neill (Ireland)

7 July 2013
20:00

Russia	0–1	Chinese Taipei
	Report	Lee Hsiu-chin 36'

Rubin Stadium
Referee: Rikako Kuwahara (Japan)
7 July 2013
20:00

South Korea	2–2	South Africa
Jang Sel-gi 33'; Moon Mi-ra 86' (pen.)	Report	Seoposenwe 54'; Smeda 90'

Trudovye Rezervy Stadium
Referee: Ana Alves (Brazil)

9 July 2013
20:00

Russia	1–3	South Korea
Cholovyaga 30'	Report	Jang Sel-gi 25'; Lee Geum-min 52', 84'

Rubin Stadium
Referee: Francia González (Mexico)
9 July 2013
20:00

Chinese Taipei	2–3	South Africa
Liu Chien-yun 62', 78'	Report	Matlou 58' (pen.); Smeda 69'; Mollo 86'

Trudovye Rezervy Stadium
Referee: Sheena Marie Law (Canada)

=== Group B ===
Team	Pld	W	D	L	GF	GA	GD	Pts
Mexico	3	3	0	0	13	6	+7	9
Republic of Ireland	3	1	1	1	3	4	−1	4
Canada	3	1	0	2	6	4	+2	3
China	3	0	1	2	2	10	−8	1

Source: Kazan 2013
5 July 2013
11:00

China	0–0	Republic of Ireland
	Report

Rubin Stadium
Referee: Ana Alves (Brazil)
5 July 2013
11:00

Canada	2–3	Mexico
Boyd 57' (pen.); Tessier 65'	Report	Corral 47', 83' (pen.); Mayor 55'

Trudovye Rezervy Stadium
Referee: Marina Mamaeva (Russia)

7 July 2013
17:00

China	2–6	Mexico
Wang Ting 22', 90+3' (pen.)	Report	Corral 12' (pen.), 73'; Monsiváis 45'; Mercado 60' (pen.); Mayor 79', 90+1'

Rubin Stadium
Referee: Irina Tereshchenko (Russia)
7 July 2013
17:00

Canada	0–1	Republic of Ireland
	Report	Lawlor 7'

Trudovye Rezervy Stadium
Referee: Park Ji-Yeong (Korea Republic)

9 July 2013
17:00

China	0–4	Canada
	Report	Tessier 2'; Lund 22' (pen.), 82' (pen.); Li Lingyi 78' (o.g.)

Rubin Stadium
Referee: Elvira Nurmustafina (Kazakhstan)
9 July 2013
17:00

Mexico	4–2	Republic of Ireland
M. Solís 18'; Corral 37'; Gallegos 45'; D. Solís 45+2'	Report	Lawlor 16'; Doherty 61'

Trudovye Rezervy Stadium
Referee: Qin Liang (China)

=== Group C ===
Team	Pld	W	D	L	GF	GA	GD	Pts
Japan	3	2	0	1	9	2	+7	6
Great Britain	3	2	0	1	8	3	+5	6
Brazil	3	2	0	1	6	2	+4	6
Estonia	3	0	0	3	1	17	−16	0

Source: Kazan 2013
5 July 2013
17:00

Japan	7–0	Estonia
Takahashi 4', 34', 78', 90+4'; Takeyama 15'; Nishikawa 42'; Nakamura 45+1'	Report

Olymp Stadium
Referee: Sheena Marie Law (Canada)
5 July 2013
17:00

Brazil	0–2	Great Britain
	Report	Kirby 62'; Whelan 81'

Raketa Stadium
Referee: Irina Tereshchenko (Russia)

7 July 2013
17:00

Japan	2–1	Great Britain
Sugita 3', 53'	Report	Lipka 50'

Raketa Stadium
Referee: Marina Mamaeva (Russia)
7 July 2013
20:00

Brazil	5–0	Estonia
Pires 32'; Viegas 40'; Crilevari 55'; Demoner 67' (pen.); Sochor 77'	Report

Raketa Stadium
Referee: Sheena Marie Law (Canada)

9 July 2013
20:00

Japan	0–1	Brazil
	Report	Demoner 21'

Olymp Stadium
Referee: Michelle O'Neill (Ireland)
9 July 2013
20:00

Great Britain	5–1	Estonia
Stanley 28'; Sweetman-Kirk 40', 70'; Hinnigan 89'; Kirby 90+2'	Report	Bannikova 1'

Raketa Stadium
Referee: Irina Tereshchenko (Russia)

== Classification rounds ==
=== 9th–12th place ===
Team	Pld	W	D	L	GF	GA	GD	Pts
Russia	3	3	0	0	8	1	+7	9
Canada	3	2	0	1	6	3	+3	6
China	3	0	1	2	2	7	−5	1
Estonia	3	0	1	2	1	6	−5	1

11 July 2013
17:00

China	1–2	Canada
Liu Bingyun 45'	Report	Lund 40', 63'

Raketa Stadium
Referee: Ana Alves (Brazil)
11 July 2013
20:00

Estonia	0–2	Russia
	Report	Chub 9'; Sinyutina 17'

Raketa Stadium
Referee: Park Ji-Yeong (Korea Republic)

13 July 2013
17:00

China	0–4	Russia
	Report	Cholovyaga 10', 62'; Pantukhina 66'; Kemryugova 87'

Raketa Stadium
Referee: Sheena Marie Law (Canada)
13 July 2013
20:00

Estonia	0–3	Canada
	Report	Emmott 68'; Tessier 84'; Lund 86'

Raketa Stadium
Referee: Francia González (Mexico)

15 July 2013
14:00

Russia	2–1	Canada
Sinyutina 23', 72'	Report	Sawicki 59'

Olymp Stadium
Referee: Qin Liang (China)
15 July 2013
14:00

China	1–1	Estonia
Zhang Yue 79'	Report	Emajõe 90+5'

Raketa Stadium
Referee: Elvira Nurmustafina (Kazakhstan)

=== Semifinal round ===
==== 5th–8th place ====
13 July 2013
17:00

Japan	2–1	South Korea
Sayama 37', 77'	Report	Lee So-dam 10'

Trudovye Rezervy Stadium
Referee: Qin Liang (China)
13 July 2013
20:00

Chinese Taipei	0–1	Republic of Ireland
	Report	Perry 16'

Trudovye Rezervy Stadium
Referee: Ana Alves (Brazil)

==== 7th-place game ====
15 July 2013
11:00

Chinese Taipei	0–6	South Korea
	Report	Seo Hyun-sook 15'; Jang Sel-gi 17', 57'; Lee Geum-min 35'; Hsieh I-ling 63' (o.g.); Moon Mi-ra 85'

Trudovye Rezervy Stadium
Referee: Michelle O'Neill (Ireland)

==== 5th-place game ====
15 July 2013
14:00

Republic of Ireland	0–4	Japan
	Report	Seguchi 43', 57'; Takahashi 67'; Saito 85'

Trudovye Rezervy Stadium
Referee: Irina Tereshchenko (Russia)

== Final round ==
Quarterfinals
A1	Chinese Taipei	1
C3	Brazil	3
B2	Republic of Ireland	0
C2	Great Britain	8
C1	Japan	3 (4)
A3	South Africa	3 (5)
A2	South Korea	0
B1	Mexico	3

Semifinals
C3	Brazil	0
C2	Great Britain	1
A3	South Africa	1
B1	Mexico	4

Gold-medal match
C2	Great Britain	6
B1	Mexico	2
Bronze-medal match
C3	Brazil	2
A3	South Africa	1

=== Quarterfinals ===
11 July 2013
17:00

Chinese Taipei	1–3	Brazil
Yu Hsiu-chin 56'	Report	Demoner 37', 64'; Crilevari 87'

Rubin Stadium
Referee: Marina Mamaeva (Russia)
11 July 2013
17:00

Republic of Ireland	0–8	Great Britain
	Report	Sweetman-Kirk 1', 51', 52'; Hinnigan 32' (pen.); Kirby 37', 61'; Carter-Loblack 49', 87'

Trudovye Rezervy Stadium
Referee: Rikako Kuwahara (Japan)
11 July 2013
20:00

Japan	3–3	South Africa
Sakaramoto 12'; Takahashi 32'; Nishikawa 78'	Report	Seoposenwe 38'; Dlamini 44'; Smeda 52'
Penalties
Sakaramoto (penalty scored); Sugita (penalty scored); Takeyama (penalty scored); Nishikawa (penalty scored); Nakamura (penalty missed)	4–5	(penalty scored) Matlou; (penalty scored) Smeda; (penalty scored) Dlamini; (penalty scored) Seoposenwe; (penalty scored) Swart

Rubin Stadium
Referee: Elvira Nurmustafina (Kazakhstan)
11 July 2013
20:00

South Korea	0–3	Mexico
	Report	M. Solís 29'; Corral 60', 84'

Trudovye Rezervy Stadium
Referee: Michelle O'Neill (Ireland)

=== Semifinals ===
13 July 2013
17:00

South Africa	1–4	Mexico
Smeda 8'	Report	Mayor 6'; Corral 29' (pen.), 88'; Monsiváis 63'

Rubin Stadium
Referee: Elvira Nurmustafina (Kazakhstan)
13 July 2013
20:00

Brazil	0–1	Great Britain
	Report	Carter-Loblack 65'

Rubin Stadium
Referee: Park Ji-Yeong (Korea Republic)

=== Bronze-medal match ===
15 July 2013
16:00

Brazil	2–1	South Africa
Travalão 67', 69'	Report	Seoposenwe 34'

Rubin Stadium
Referee: Marina Mamaeva (Russia)

=== Gold-medal match ===
15 July 2013
20:00

Great Britain	6–2	Mexico
Cole 18'; Christiansen 36'; Kirby 82', 88'; Whelan 87'; Carter-Loblack 90+1'	Report	Monsiváis 10'; Corral 26'

Rubin Stadium
Referee: Rikako Kuwahara (Japan)

== Final standings ==
Place	Team	Score
1st place, gold medalist(s)	Great Britain	5–0–1
2nd place, silver medalist(s)	Mexico	5–0–1
3rd place, bronze medalist(s)	Brazil	4–0–2
4	South Africa	2–1–3
5	Japan	4–0–2
6	Republic of Ireland	2–1–3
7	South Korea	2–1–3
8	Chinese Taipei	2–0–4
9	Russia	4–0–2
10	Canada	3–0–3
11	China	0–2–4
12	Estonia	0–1–5
