= Liliana Sánchez =

Mexican footballer (born 1997)

Personal information
- Full name: Liliana Sánchez Magaña
- Date of birth: 16 November 1997 (age 28)
- Place of birth: Venustiano Carranza, Mexico City, Mexico
- Height: 1.59 m (5 ft 3 in)
- Position: Centre-back

Senior career*
| Years | Team | Apps | (Gls) |
| 2017–2019 | Necaxa | 60 | (2) |
| 2019–2022 | León | 97 | (5) |
| 2023–2025 | Puebla | 84 | (0) |
- * Club domestic league appearances and goals as of 4 June 2023

Liliana Sánchez Magaña (born 16 November 1997) is a Mexican professional footballer who played as a centre-back for Liga MX Femenil side Puebla.

== Club career ==
In 2017, she started her career in Necaxa. In 2019, she was transferred to León. In 2023, she signed with Puebla.
