= Yashira Barrientos =

Mexican football player (born 1994)

Personal information
- Full name: Yashira Yuleth Barrientos González
- Date of birth: 29 November 1994 (age 31)
- Place of birth: Nuevo Laredo, Tamaulipas, Mexico
- Height: 1.60 m (5 ft 3 in)
- Position: Forward

Team information
- Current team: León
- Number: 33

Senior career*
Years	Team	Apps	(Gls)
2019–2022	Guadalajara	40	(10)
2022–	León	87	(31)
- * Club domestic league appearances and goals as of 9 February 2026

Yashira Yuleth Barrientos González (born 29 November 1994) is a Mexican football forward who plays for León in the Liga MX Femenil.

== Career ==
Yashira Barrientos was born on 29 November 1994 in Nuevo Laredo, Tamaulipas.

She played football since school and she was offered a scholarship to play and study at the Autonomous University of Nuevo León. During this time, she was part of the squad that represented Mexico at the 2019 Summer Universiade football tournament in Naples.

On 12 July 2019, Barrientos was signed to Guadalajara and she finished the 2019–20 season as the team's top scorer with nine goals.

== Career statistics ==
=== Club ===
As of match played 13 August 2020

Appearances and goals by club, season and competition
Club	Season	League			Total	
Club	Season	Division	Apps	Goals	Apps	Goals
Guadalajara	2019–20	Liga MX Femenil	23	9	23	9
Guadalajara	2020–21	Liga MX Femenil	1	0	1	0
Guadalajara	Total		24	9	24	9
Career total			24	9	24	9
