= Alondra Camargo =

Mexican footballer (born 1995)

Personal information
- Full name: Alondra Karime Camargo Aguilar
- Date of birth: 9 January 1995 (age 31)
- Place of birth: Navolato, Sinaloa, Mexico
- Height: 1.65 m (5 ft 5 in)
- Position: Centre-back

Team information
- Current team: León
- Number: 14

Senior career*
Years	Team	Apps	(Gls)
2018–2020	Tijuana	50	(4)
2020–2024	Querétaro	115	(7)
2025–	León	35	(1)
- * Club domestic league appearances and goals as of 9 February 2026 ‡ National team caps and goals as of 12 March 2022

Alondra Karime Camargo Aguilar (born 9 January 1995) is a Mexican professional footballer who plays as a Centre-back for Liga MX Femenil side León.

In 2018, she started her career in Tijuana. In 2020, she was transferred to Querétaro . In 2025, she joined to León .
