= Luciana Riefkohl =

Mexican footballer (born 1999)

Personal information
- Full name: Luciana Nicolé García Riefkohl
- Date of birth: 12 July 1999 (age 27)
- Place of birth: Acapulco, Guerrero, Mexico
- Height: 1.64 m (5 ft 5 in)
- Position: Forward

Team information
- Current team: León
- Number: 20

College career
Years	Team	Apps	(Gls)
2018–2021	Charleston Cougars	6	(0)

Senior career*
Years	Team	Apps	(Gls)
2021–2022	Necaxa	31	(9)
2022–2023	Juárez	13	(0)
2023–2024	Tijuana	9	(1)
2024–2025	Atlético San Luis	30	(7)
2025–	León	18	(5)
- * Club domestic league appearances and goals as of 9 February 2026 ‡ National team caps and goals as of 12 March 2022

Luciana Nicolé García Riefkohl (born 12 July 1999) is a Mexican professional footballer who plays as a Forward for Liga MX Femenil side Atlético San Luis.

== Club career ==
In 2021, she started her career in Necaxa. In 2022, she was transferred to Juárez. In 2023, she signed with Tijuana. Since 2024, she is part of Atlético San Luis.
