= Dinora Garza =

Mexican footballer (born 1988)

Personal information
- Full name: Dinora Lizeth Garza Rodriguez
- Date of birth: 24 January 1988 (age 38)
- Place of birth: Reynosa, Tamaulipas, Mexico
- Height: 1.67 m (5 ft 6 in)
- Position: Attacking midfielder

Senior career*
| Years | Team | Apps | (Gls) |
| 2013 | Chicago Red Stars | 2 | (0) |
| 2017–2020 | Monterrey | 83 | (22) |
| 2021–2023 | UNAM | 98 | (7) |
| 2024 | León | 16 | (2) |
| 2025 | Atlético San Luis | 14 | (0) |

International career
| 2008 | Mexico U-20 | | |
| 2011–2014 | Mexico | 30 | (5) |
- * Club domestic league appearances and goals as of 22 August 2013

Dinora Lizeth Garza Rodríguez (born 24 January 1988) is a former Mexican footballer who last played as a striker for Liga MX Femenil club Atlético San Luis.

== Playing career ==
=== Club ===
==== Chicago Red Stars ====
In January 2013, Garza was included in a list of 55 players from the U.S., Canada, and Mexico national teams that were allocated to the eight teams in the new National Women's Soccer League. She was allocated to the Chicago Red Stars. In 2014, Garza was reallocated to the Boston Breakers but declined to participate in the league any further.
