= Marlyn Campa =

Mexican footballer (born 1994)

Personal information
- Full name: Marlyn Margoth Campa Ávalos
- Date of birth: 4 March 1994 (age 32)
- Place of birth: Los Angeles, California, United States
- Height: 1.60 m (5 ft 3 in)
- Position: Winger

College career
Years	Team	Apps	(Gls)
2012–2016	Texas Southern Tigers		

Senior career*
Years	Team	Apps	(Gls)
2020	América	22	(7)
2021–2022	UNAM	43	(8)
2022–2023	Pachuca	23	(1)
2023–2024	León	29	(0)
2024–2025	Toluca	18	(0)
2026	Puebla	9	(1)
- * Club domestic league appearances and goals as of 29 February 2024 ‡ National team caps and goals as of 29 February 2024

Marlyn Margoth Campa Ávalos (born 4 March 1994) is a professional footballer who plays as a Winger for Liga MX Femenil side Puebla.

== Career ==
In 2020, she started her career in América. In 2021, she was transferred to UNAM. In 2023, she joined León. In 2026, she signed with Puebla.
