= Cindy Arteaga =

Mexican footballer (born 2001)

Personal information
- Full name: Sindia Anahi Arteaga García
- Date of birth: 28 June 2001 (age 25)
- Place of birth: Santa Rosa, California, United States
- Height: 1.64 m (5 ft 5 in)
- Position: Forward

Team information
- Current team: León
- Number: 11

College career
Years	Team	Apps	(Gls)
2019–2022	Cal State Northridge	60	(12)

Senior career*
Years	Team	Apps	(Gls)
2023–2024	UNAM	20	(4)
2025–	León	21	(5)

International career
2025–	Mexico U23		
- * Club domestic league appearances and goals as of 9 February 2026

Sindia Anahi Arteaga García (born 28 June 2001), known as Cindy Arteaga, is a professional footballer who plays as a Forward for Liga MX Femenil side León. Born and raised in the United States, she represents Mexico internationally.

== Career ==
Arteaga started her career in 2023 with UNAM. Afterwards, she signed for León in 2025.

== International career ==
Since 2025, Arteaga has been part of the Mexico U-23 team.
