= Nicole Buenfil =

Mexican footballer (born 1999)

- Buenfil in 2021

Personal information
- Full name: Nicole Buenfil Renoult
- Date of birth: 11 February 1999 (age 27)
- Place of birth: Zapopan, Jalisco, Mexico
- Height: 1.72 m (5 ft 8 in)
- Position: Goalkeeper

Team information
- Current team: León
- Number: 1

Senior career*
Years	Team	Apps	(Gls)
2018–2021	Atlas	7	(0)
2021–2022	Santos Laguna	17	(0)
2022–2024	Atlético San Luis	77	(0)
2025–	León	26	(0)
- * Club domestic league appearances and goals as of 9 February 2026 ‡ National team caps and goals as of 12 March 2022

Nicole Buenfil Renoult (born 11 February 1999) is a Mexican professional footballer who plays as a goalkeeper for Liga MX Femenil side León.

In 2018, she started her career in Atlas. In 2021, she was transferred to Santos Laguna. In 2022, she joined to Atlético San Luis. In 2025, she joined to León .
