= Isabela Esquivias =

Mexican footballer (born 2004)

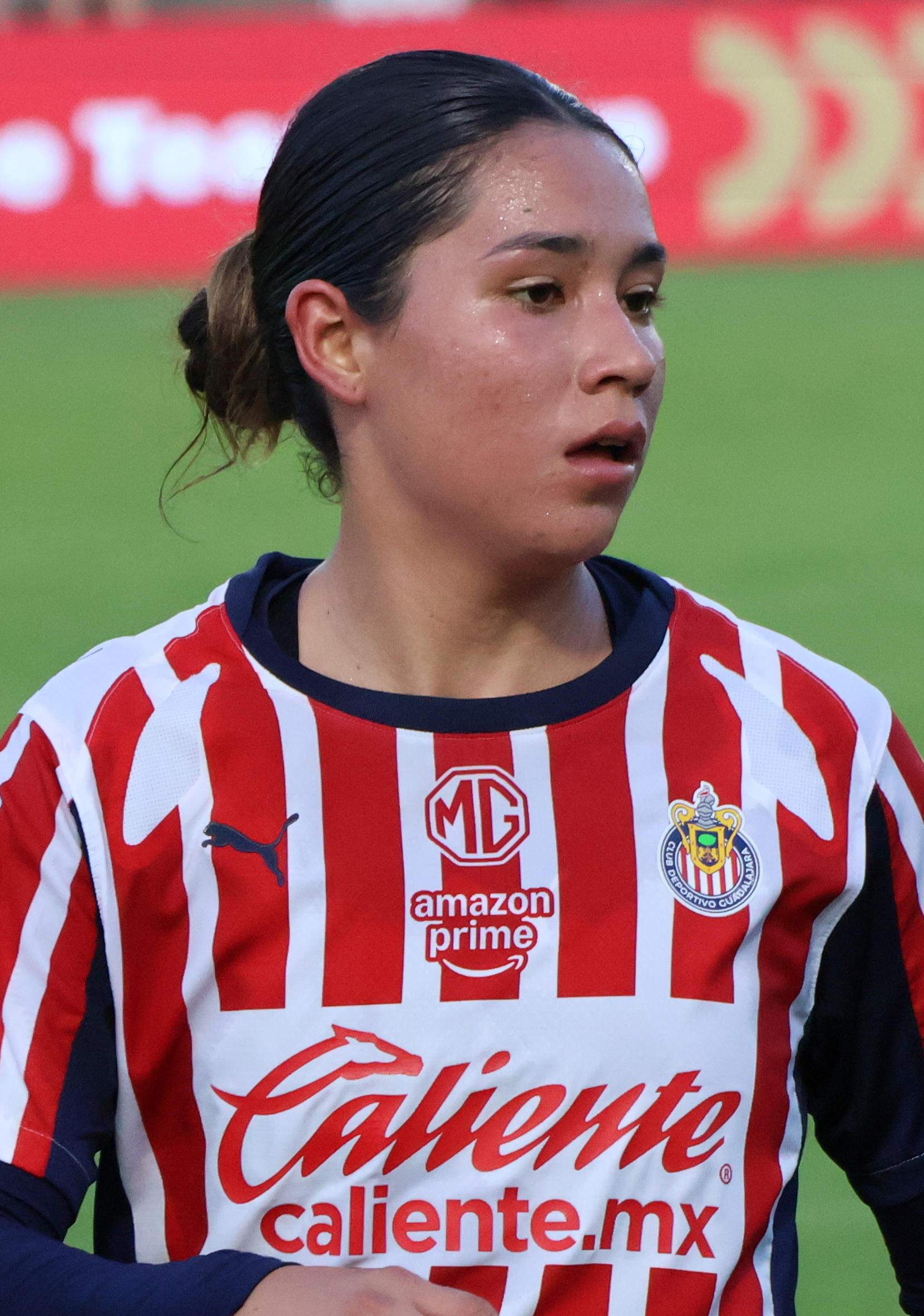
- Esquivias with Guadalajara in 2025

Personal information
- Full name: Isabela Esquivias Liceaga
- Date of birth: 14 February 2004 (age 22)
- Place of birth: León, Guanajuato, Mexico
- Height: 1.64 m (5 ft 5 in)
- Position: Left-back

Team information
- Current team: León
- Number: 30

Senior career*
| Years | Team | Apps | (Gls) |
| 2018–2022 | Pachuca | 25 | (0) |
| 2023–2024 | León | 55 | (2) |
| 2025–2026 | Guadalajara | 17 | (0) |
| 2026– | León | 0 | (0) |

International career^{‡}
| 2023–2024 | Mexico U20 | | |
- * Club domestic league appearances and goals as of 31 January 2026 ‡ National team caps and goals as of 12 March 2022

Isabela Esquivias Liceaga (born 14 February 2004) is a Mexican professional footballer who plays as a left-back for Liga MX Femenil club León.

== Career ==
In 2018, she started her career in Pachuca. In 2023, she was transferred to León. Since 2025, she is part of Guadalajara.

== International career ==
Since 2023, Esquivias has been part of the Mexico U-20 team.
