= Valeria Razo =

Mexican footballer (born 2002)

Personal information
- Full name: Valeria Razo Correa
- Date of birth: 18 September 2002 (age 24)
- Place of birth: Guadalajara, Jalisco, Mexico
- Height: 1.65 m (5 ft 5 in)
- Position: Left-back

Team information
- Current team: León
- Number: 6

Senior career*
Years	Team	Apps	(Gls)
2020–2024	Atlas	89	(6)
2026–	León	10	(0)
- * Club domestic league appearances and goals as of 9 February 2026 ‡ National team caps and goals as of 12 March 2022

Valeria Razo Correa (born 18 September 2002) is a Mexican professional footballer who plays as a Left-back for Liga MX Femenil side León.

In 2020, she started her career in Atlas. In 2026, she joined to León.
