= Claudia Lozoya =

Mexican footballer (born 1995)

Personal information
- Full name: Claudia Ivette Lozoya Lechuga
- Date of birth: 7 June 1995 (age 31)
- Place of birth: Chihuahua City, Chihuahua, Mexico
- Height: 1.70 m (5 ft 7 in)
- Position: Goalkeeper

Team information
- Current team: Toluca
- Number: 1

Senior career*
Years	Team	Apps	(Gls)
2017–2023	Monterrey	108	(0)
2023–2024	Mazatlán	20	(0)
2024–2026	Querétaro	44	(0)
2026–	Toluca	0	(0)
- * Club domestic league appearances and goals as of 5 February 2026 ‡ National team caps and goals as of 12 March 2022

Claudia Ivette Lozoya Lechuga (born 7 June 1995) is a Mexican professional footballer who plays as a goalkeeper for Liga MX Femenil side Toluca.

== Career ==
In 2017, she started her career in Monterrey. In 2023, she was transferred to Mazatlán . In 2024, she joined to Querétaro .
