= Joselyn de la Rosa =

Mexican footballer (born 1996)

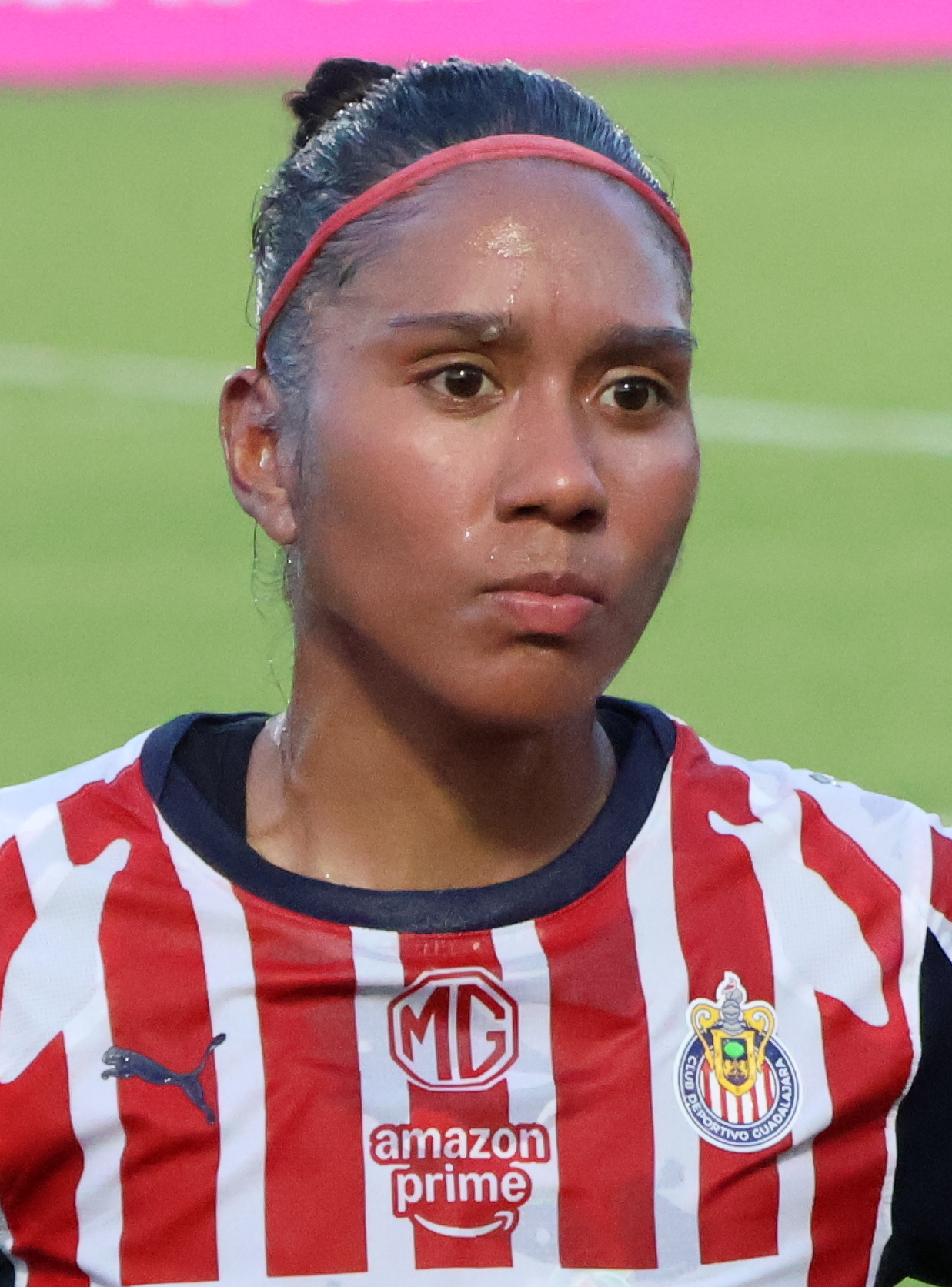
- De la Rosa with Guadalajara in 2025

Personal information
- Full name: Joselyn de la Rosa Cruz
- Date of birth: 22 July 1999 (age 27)
- Place of birth: Acapulco, Guerrero, Mexico
- Height: 1.60 m (5 ft 3 in)
- Position: Defensive midfielder

Team information
- Current team: León
- Number: 7

Senior career*
Years	Team	Apps	(Gls)
2017	Pachuca	11	(0)
2018–2021	León	99	(6)
2021–2024	Tijuana	98	(4)
2024–2026	Guadalajara	35	(3)
2026–	León	0	(0)
- * Club domestic league appearances and goals as of 1 February 2026

Joselyn de la Rosa Cruz (born 22 July 1999) is a Mexican professional footballer who plays as a defensive midfielder for Liga MX Femenil club León.

== Career ==
In 2017, de la Rosa started her career in Pachuca. In 2018, she was transferred to León. In 2021 she signed with Tijuana. Since 2024, she is part of Guadalajara.
