= Valeria Valdez =

Mexican footballer (born 1994)

Personal information
- Full name: Valeria Valdez Varela
- Date of birth: 29 January 1994 (age 32)
- Place of birth: Tijuana, Baja California, Mexico
- Height: 1.63 m (5 ft 4 in)
- Position: Defensive midfielder

Team information
- Current team: Cruz Azul
- Number: 19

Senior career*
Years	Team	Apps	(Gls)
2017–2024	Monterrey	162	(7)
2024–	Cruz Azul	55	(7)
- * Club domestic league appearances and goals as of 1 February 2026 ‡ National team caps and goals as of 12 March 2022

Valeria Valdez Varela (born 10 July 1986) is a Mexican professional footballer who plays as a Defensive midfielder for Liga MX Femenil club Cruz Azul, whom she captains.

== Career ==
In 2017, she started her career in Monterrey.
