= Alejandra Sorchini =

Mexican footballer (born 1994)

Personal information
- Full name: Andrea Alejandra Balderas Sorchini
- Date of birth: 30 April 1994 (age 32)
- Place of birth: Parras, Coahuila, Mexico
- Height: 1.61 m (5 ft 3 in)
- Position: Right-back

Senior career*
| Years | Team | Apps | (Gls) |
| 2017–2018 | Monterrey | 21 | (0) |
| 2018 | América | 0 | (0) |
| 2019 | Atlas | 2 | (0) |
| 2020 | Juárez | 2 | (0) |
| 2020–2023 | Necaxa | 48 | (1) |
| 2023–2024 | Mazatlán | 36 | (0) |
- * Club domestic league appearances and goals as of 4 June 2023 ‡ National team caps and goals as of 12 March 2022

Andrea Alejandra Balderas Sorchini (born 30 April 1994) is a Mexican former professional footballer who last played as a Right-back for Liga MX Femenil side Mazatlán.

== Career ==
In 2017, she started her career in Monterrey. In 2018, she was transferred to América. In 2019, she joined to Atlas. In 2020, she moved to Juárez. In 2020, she was transferred to Necaxa. Since 2023, she is part of Mazatlán.
