= Brenda León =

Mexican footballer (born 1993)

Personal information
- Full name: Brenda León Romano
- Date of birth: 8 September 1993 (age 33)
- Place of birth: Tlaxcala, Tlaxcala, Mexico
- Height: 1.57 m (5 ft 2 in)
- Position: Defensive midfielder

Team information
- Current team: Puebla U-19 (women) (Manager)

Senior career*
Years	Team	Apps	(Gls)
2018–2019	Lobos BUAP	29	(3)
2019–2021	Cruz Azul	72	(8)
2022	Necaxa	15	(1)
2022–2023	Santos Laguna	38	(3)
2024	Cruz Azul	0	(0)

International career^{‡}
2020	Mexico	1	(0)

Managerial career
- 2026: Puebla U-19 (women) (Assistant)
- 2026–: Puebla U-19 (women)
- * Club domestic league appearances and goals as of 24 February 2020 ‡ National team caps and goals as of 11 March 2020

Brenda León Romano (born 8 September 1993) is a Mexican former footballer who played as a defensive midfielder. She played for the Mexico women's national team.

== International career ==
León made her senior debut for Mexico on 11 March 2020 in a 0–0 friendly draw against the Czech Republic.
