= Diana Evangelista =

Mexican football player (born 1994)

Personal information
- Full name: Diana Laura Evangelista Chávez
- Date of birth: 5 November 1994 (age 31)
- Place of birth: Colima City, Colima, Mexico
- Height: 1.56 m (5 ft 1 1/2 in)
- Position: Winger

Team information
- Current team: Monterrey U-19 (women) (Assistant)

Senior career*
Years	Team	Apps	(Gls)
2017–2026	Monterrey	117	(41)

International career^{‡}
2019–2020	Mexico	5	(0)

Managerial career
- 2026–: Monterrey U-19 (women) (Assistant)
- * Club domestic league appearances and goals as of 11:26, 4 January 2020 (UTC) ‡ National team caps and goals as of 11:26, 4 January 2020 (UTC)

Diana Laura Evangelista Chávez (born 5 November 1994) is a former Mexican footballer who last played as a winger for Liga MX Femenil club Monterrey and the Mexico women's national team.

== International career ==
In 2015 Evangelista represented Mexico at the Summer Universiade in Gwangju, South Korea. She made her debut for the senior Mexico women's national team on 12 December 2019, in a 6–0 friendly defeat by Brazil at Arena Corinthians in São Paulo.
