= Alicia Cervantes =

Mexican footballer (born 1994)

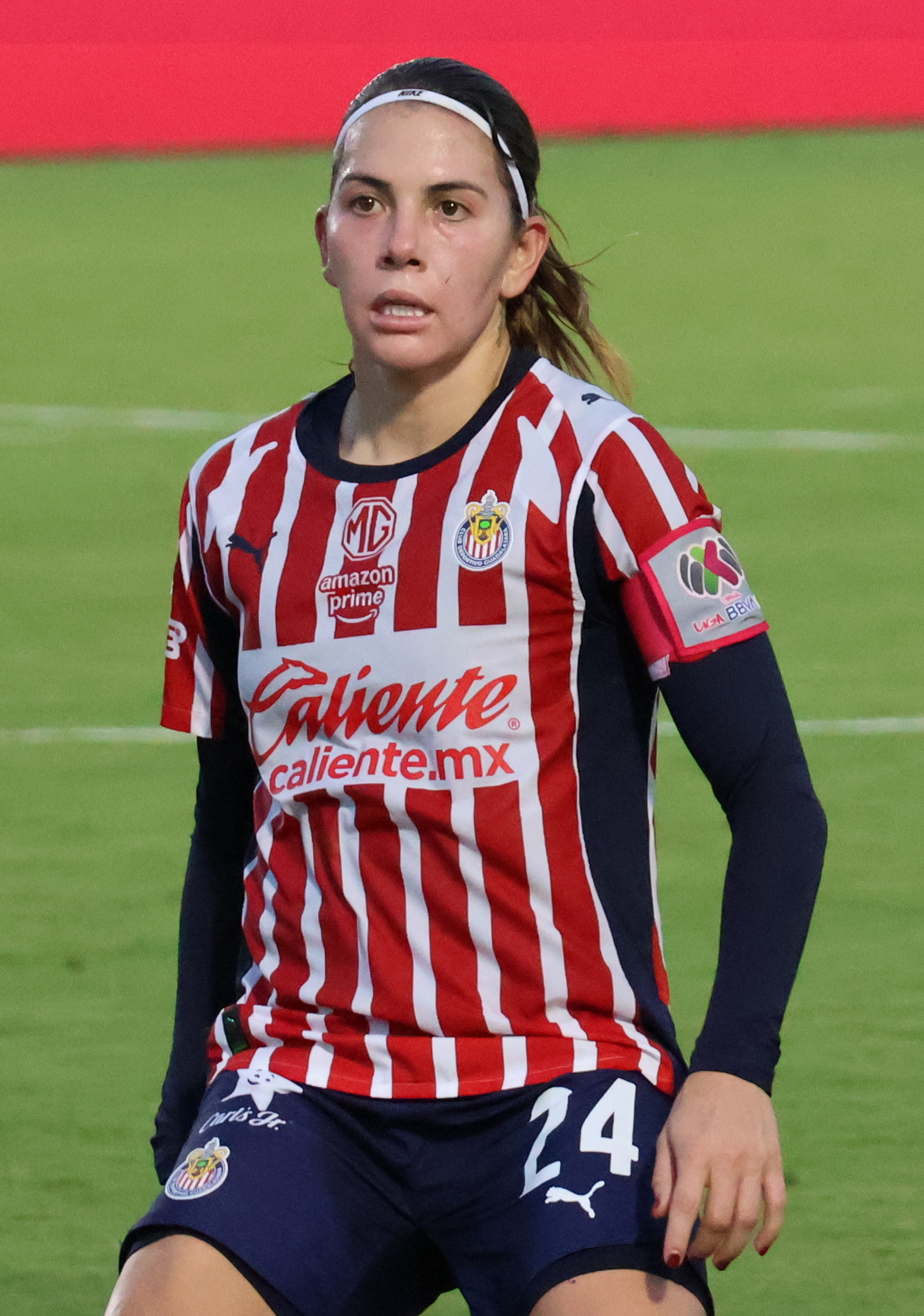
- Cervantes with Guadalajara in 2025

Personal information
- Full name: Alicia Cervantes Herrera
- Date of birth: 24 January 1994 (age 32)
- Place of birth: Arandas, Jalisco, Mexico
- Height: 1.67 m (5 ft 6 in)
- Position: Forward

Team information
- Current team: Guadalajara
- Number: 24

Senior career*
Years	Team	Apps	(Gls)
2017	Atlas	13	(9)
2018–2020	Monterrey	58	(12)
2020–	Guadalajara	163	(161)

International career
2021–	Mexico	10	(9)
Medal record
Women's football
Representing Mexico
Pan American Games
Gold medal – first place	2023 Santiago	Team
- * Club domestic league appearances and goals as of 16 February 2025

Alicia "Licha" Cervantes Herrera (born 24 January 1994) is a Mexican professional footballer who plays as a forward for Liga MX Femenil side Guadalajara and the Mexico national team.

A prolific goal scorer, Cervantes is Chivas historic top goal scorer and one of the top goal scorers in Liga MX Femenil, with more than 150 league goals.

== Early life ==
Alicia Cervantes was born on 24 January 1994 in Arandas, Jalisco.

== Club career ==
She made her professional debut playing for Atlas on 29 July 2017 in a match against Guadalajara. Cervantes left Atlas at the end of the tournament because the club management refused to raise her $1500 MXN monthly wage (approximately $60 USD).

In 2019 she moved to Monterrey where she played for two seasons, winning the Apertura 2019 championship with the Rayadas.

In June 2020, Cervantes was transferred to Guadalajara.

In January 2022, IFFHS recognized Cervantes as the top first-division scorer in the world in 2021, alongside Lucie Martínková.

== International career ==
Cervantes was selected to represent Mexico at the 2023 Pan American Games held in Santiago, Chile, where the Mexican squad went undefeated to won the gold medal for the first time in their history at the Pan American Games, defeating Chile 1–0.

== Personal life ==
Despite making her professional debut with Guadalajara's rivals Atlas, Cervantes stated that she has always been a Guadalajara supporter, thus being able to play for her favorite team in 2020 when she was transferred to the Chivas.

== Career statistics ==
=== Club ===
As of match played 19 October 2023

Appearances and goals by club, season and competition
Club	Season	League			Total	
Club	Season	Division	Apps	Goals	Apps	Goals
Atlas	2017–18	Liga MX Femenil	13	9	13	9
Atlas	Total		13	9	13	9
Monterrey	2018–19	Liga MX Femenil	27	9	27	9
Monterrey	2019–20	Liga MX Femenil	18	2	18	2
Monterrey	Total		45	11	45	11
Guadalajara	2020–21	Liga MX Femenil	37	32	37	32
Guadalajara	2021–22	Liga MX Femenil	39	37	39	37
Guadalajara	2022–23	Liga MX Femenil	24	19	24	19
Guadalajara	2023–24	Liga MX Femenil	16	15	16	15
Guadalajara	Total		116	103	116	103
Career total			174	123	174	123

=== International goals ===
Scores and results list Mexico's goal tally first.

No.	Date	Venue	Opponent	Score	Result	Competition
1.	27 November 2021	Centro de Alto Rendimiento, Mexico City, Mexico	Canada	2–0	2–1	Friendly
2.	17 February 2022	Estadio Universitario, San Nicolas de los Garza, Mexico	Suriname	9–0	9–0	2022 CONCACAF W Championship qualification
3.	20 February 2022	Félix Sánchez Olympic Stadium, Santo Domingo, Dominican Republic	Antigua and Barbuda	4–0	8–0	2022 CONCACAF W Championship qualification
4.	9 April 2022	Raymond E. Guishard Technical Centre, The Valley, Anguilla	Anguilla	1–0	11–0	2022 CONCACAF W Championship qualification
5.	9 April 2022	Raymond E. Guishard Technical Centre, The Valley, Anguilla	Anguilla	2–0	11–0	2022 CONCACAF W Championship qualification
6.	9 April 2022	Raymond E. Guishard Technical Centre, The Valley, Anguilla	Anguilla	6–0	11–0	2022 CONCACAF W Championship qualification
7.	26 September 2023	Estadio Hidalgo, Pachuca, Mexico	Trinidad and Tobago	3–0	6–0	2024 CONCACAF W Gold Cup qualification
8.	26 September 2023	Estadio Hidalgo, Pachuca, Mexico	Trinidad and Tobago	6–0	6–0	2024 CONCACAF W Gold Cup qualification
9.	22 October 2023	Estadio Elías Figueroa Brander, Valparaíso, Chile	Jamaica	5–0	7–0	2023 Pan American Games

== Honours ==
Monterrey

- Liga MX Femenil: Apertura 2019

Guadalajara

- Liga MX Femenil: Apertura 2021, Clausura 2022

Mexico

- Pan American Games: 2023, gold medal
