= Gabriela Valenzuela =

Mexican footballer (born 1999)

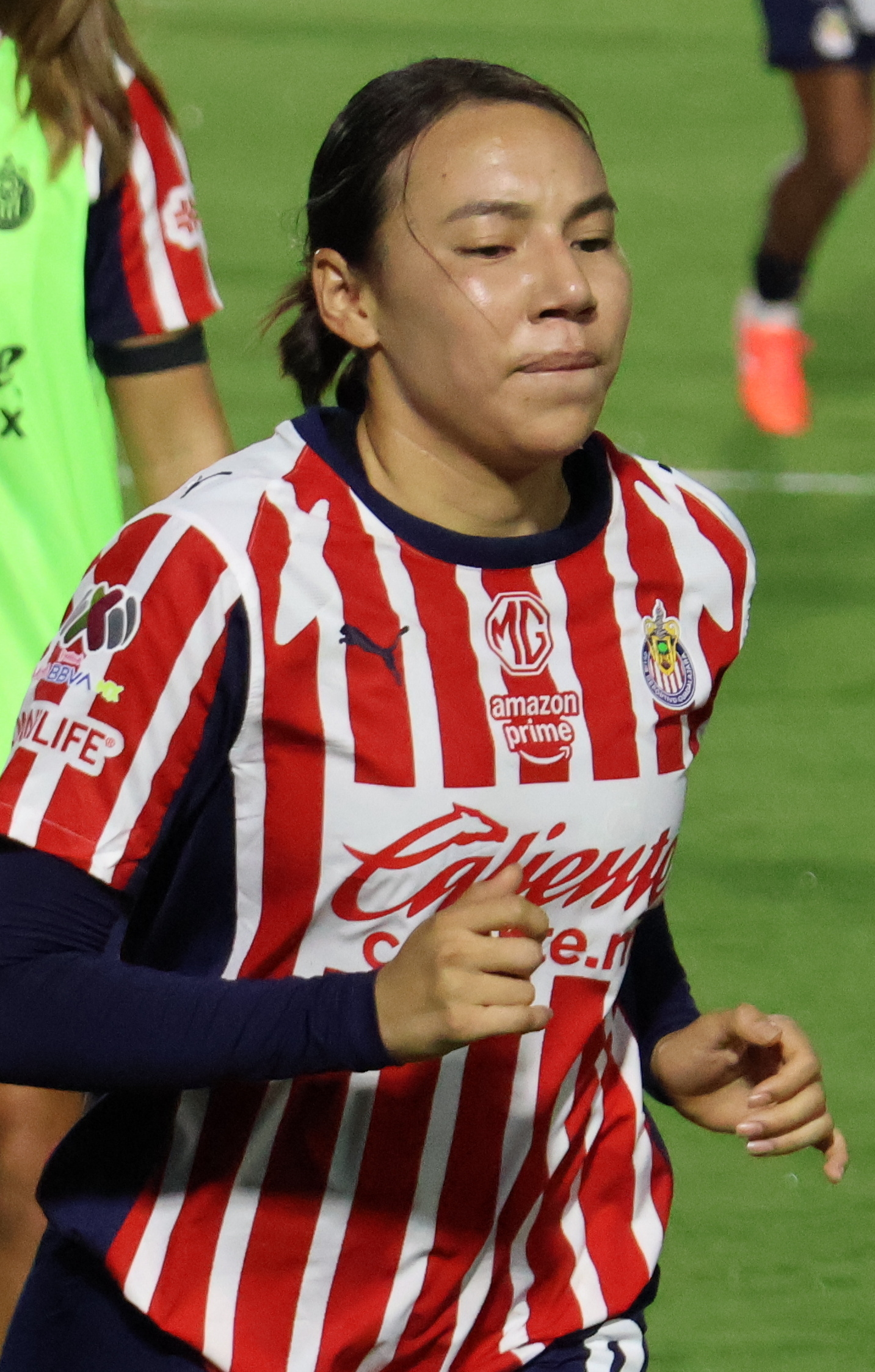
- Valenzuela with Guadalajara in 2025

Personal information
- Full name: Gabriela Valenzuela Chaparro
- Date of birth: 7 April 1999 (age 27)
- Place of birth: Ahome, Sinaloa, Mexico
- Height: 1.59 m (5 ft 3 in)
- Position: Winger

Team information
- Current team: Guadalajara
- Number: 9

Senior career*
Years	Team	Apps	(Gls)
2021–	Guadalajara	141	(21)

International career^{‡}
2022–	Mexico	2	(0)
- * Club domestic league appearances and goals as of 1 February 2026 ‡ National team caps and goals as of March 2024

Gabriela Valenzuela Chaparro (born 7 April 1999) is a Mexican professional footballer who plays as a winger for Liga MX Femenil club Guadalajara and the Mexico national team.

== Career ==
In 2021, she started her career in Guadalajara, where she won a championship. Due to her good performances, she was called to the Mexican national team.

== International career ==
Valenzuela was part of the Mexico team that played the Mexico Women's Tour 2023. She played in the two matches.

== Honours ==
Guadalajara

- Liga MX Femenil: Clausura 2022

== Career statistics ==
=== Club ===
As of match played 4 June 2023

Appearances and goals by club, season and competition
Club	Season	League			Total	
Club	Season	Division	Apps	Goals	Apps	Goals
Guadalajara	2020–21	Liga MX Femenil	7	0	7	0
Guadalajara	2021–22	Liga MX Femenil	20	1	20	1
Guadalajara	2022–23	Liga MX Femenil	32	9	32	9
Guadalajara	2023–24	Liga MX Femenil	7	2	7	2
Guadalajara	Total		66	12	66	12
Career total			66	12	66	12
