= Damaris Godínez =

Mexican footballer (born 1999)

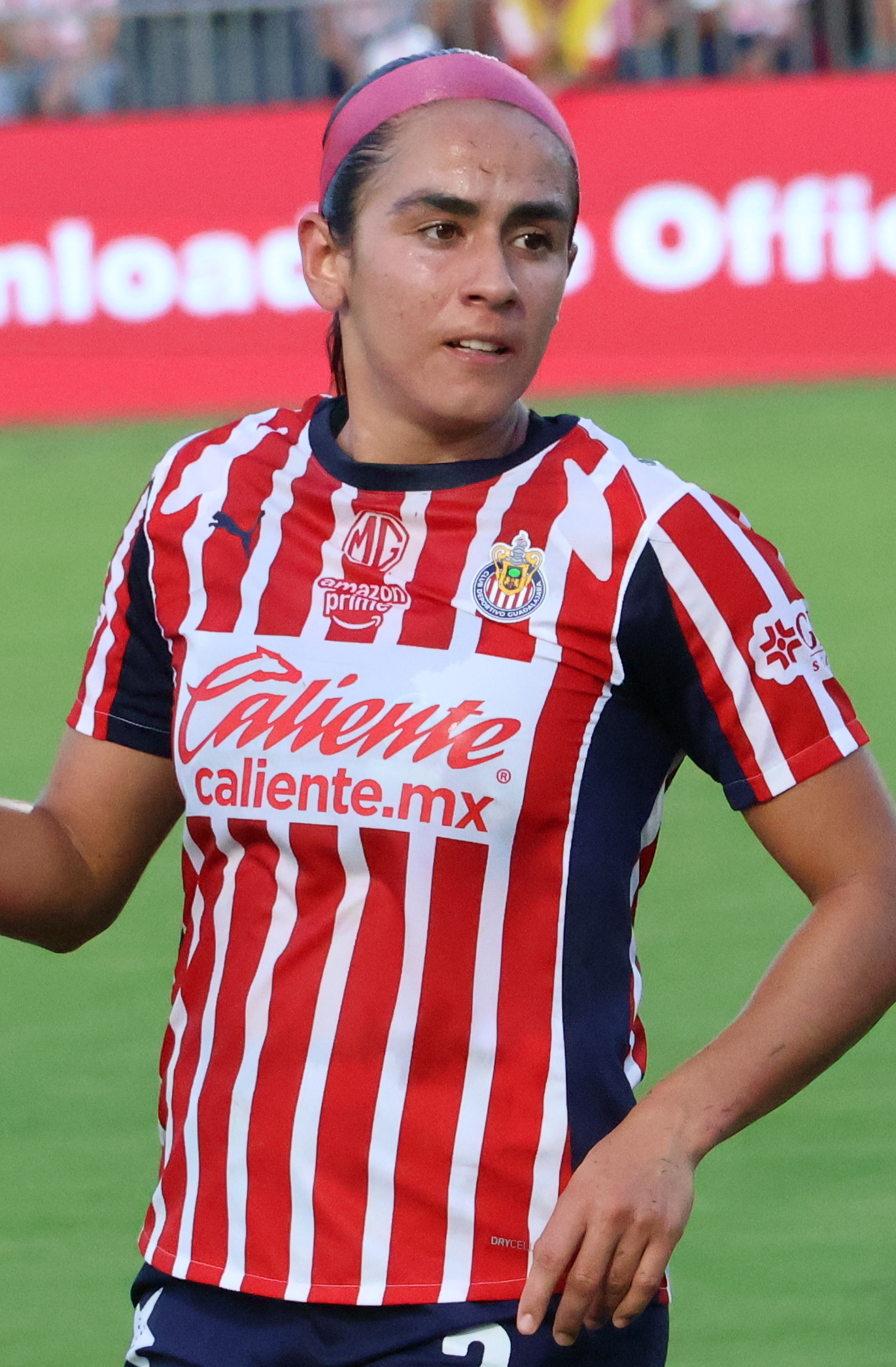
- Godínez with Guadalajara in 2025

Personal information
- Full name: Damaris Michel Godínez García
- Date of birth: 22 July 1999 (age 27)
- Place of birth: Zapopan, Jalisco, Mexico
- Height: 1.59 m (5 ft 3 in)
- Position: Left-back

Team information
- Current team: Guadalajara
- Number: 3

Senior career*
Years	Team	Apps	(Gls)
2018	León	27	(1)
2019	Puebla	16	(3)
2019–	Guadalajara	176	(9)
- * Club domestic league appearances and goals as of 31 January 2026 ‡ National team caps and goals as of 12 March 2022

Damaris Michel Godínez García (born 22 July 1999) is a Mexican professional footballer who plays as a left-back for Liga MX Femenil side Guadalajara. She is the sister of the fellow footballer Alexandra Godínez.

== Career ==
In 2018, she started her career in León. In 2019, she was transferred to Puebla. Since 2019, she is part of Guadalajara.
