= Michelle González (footballer) =

Mexican footballer (born 1995)

Personal information
- Full name: Michelle González Mercado
- Date of birth: 20 July 1995 (age 31)
- Place of birth: Iztacalco, Mexico City, Mexico
- Height: 1.69 m (5 ft 7 in)
- Position: Centre-back

Senior career*
| Years | Team | Apps | (Gls) |
| 2017–2018 | Pachuca | 20 | (0) |
| 2018–2019 | León | 32 | (4) |
| 2020–2023 | Guadalajara | 88 | (8) |
| 2024 | Toluca | 28 | (2) |
| 2025 | Santos Laguna | 15 | (2) |

International career
| 2011–2012 | Mexico U17 | | |
- * Club domestic league appearances and goals as of 4 June 2023

Michelle González Mercado (born 20 July 1995) is a Mexican professional footballer who plays as a Centre-back.

== Career ==
In 2017, she started her career in Pachuca. In 2018, she was transferred to León. In 2020, she joined to Guadalajara. Since 2024, she is part of Toluca.

== International career ==
Mercado represented Mexico at the 2012 FIFA U-17 Women's World Cup.
