= Mariana Cadena =

Mexican footballer (born 1995)

Personal information
- Full name: Mariana Cadena Calvillo
- Date of birth: 13 February 1995 (age 31)
- Place of birth: Monterrey, Nuevo León, Mexico
- Height: 1.68 m (5 ft 6 in)
- Position: Centre back

Team information
- Current team: Juárez
- Number: 21

Senior career*
Years	Team	Apps	(Gls)
2017–2023	Monterrey	221	(4)
2024	América	15	(0)
2025	Pachuca	0	(0)
2026–	Juárez	0	(0)

International career
2013–2014	Mexico U17		
2014–2015	Mexico U20		
2017–	Mexico	3	(0)
- * Club domestic league appearances and goals as of 31 May 2024

Mariana Cadena Calvillo (born 13 February 1995) is a Mexican professional footballer who plays as a centre back for Liga MX Femenil side Juárez. She is also a member of the Mexico women's national team.

== International career ==
Cadena debuted for the Mexico national team in a 2017 friendly against Venezuela.
