= Jaqueline Rodríguez =

Mexican footballer (born 1996)

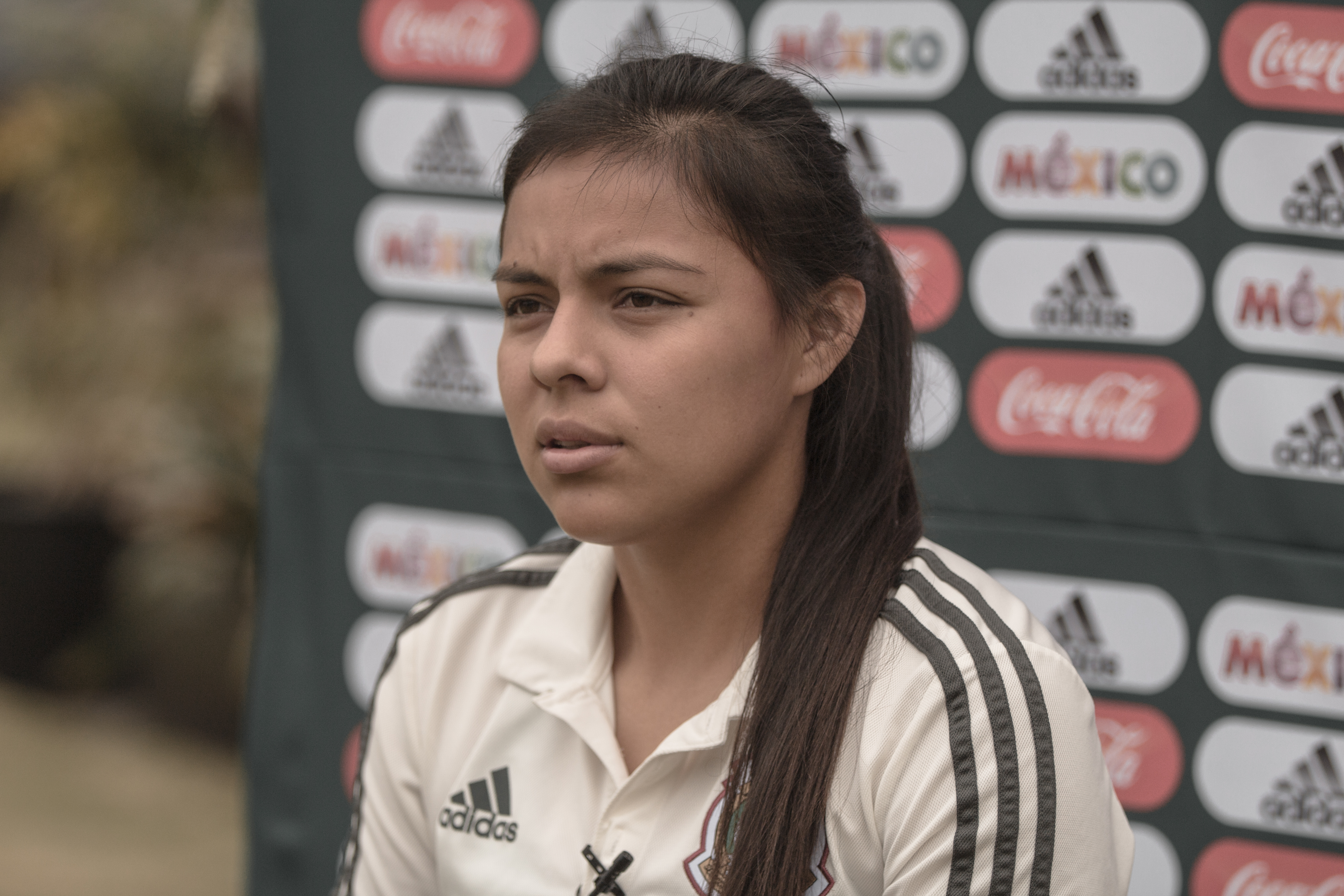

Personal information
- Full name: Diana Jaqueline Rodríguez Carrillo
- Date of birth: 7 September 1996 (age 30)
- Place of birth: Tequixquiac, State of Mexico, Mexico
- Height: 1.73 m (5 ft 8 in)
- Position: Right-back

Team information
- Current team: Guadalajara
- Number: 2

Senior career*
Years	Team	Apps	(Gls)
2019–	Guadalajara	136	(4)

International career^{‡}
2011–2012	Mexico U17		
2013–2014	Mexico U20		
- * Club domestic league appearances and goals as of 4 June 2023 ‡ National team caps and goals as of 12 March 2022

Diana Jaqueline Rodríguez Carrillo (born in Santiago Tequixquiac, 7 September 1996) is a Mexican professional footballer who plays as a defender for Liga MX Femenil side Guadalajara.

== Career ==
In 2019, she started her career in Guadalajara. The team, with Rodríguez as an important figure, won a league for a second time in the 2021–22 Liga MX Femenil season.

== International career ==
Rodríguez represented Mexico at the 2012 FIFA U-17 Women's World Cup and in the 2014 FIFA U-20 Women's World Cup.

== Honours ==
Guadalajara

- Liga MX Femenil: Clausura 2022
