= Kinberly Guzmán =

Mexican footballer (born 2002)

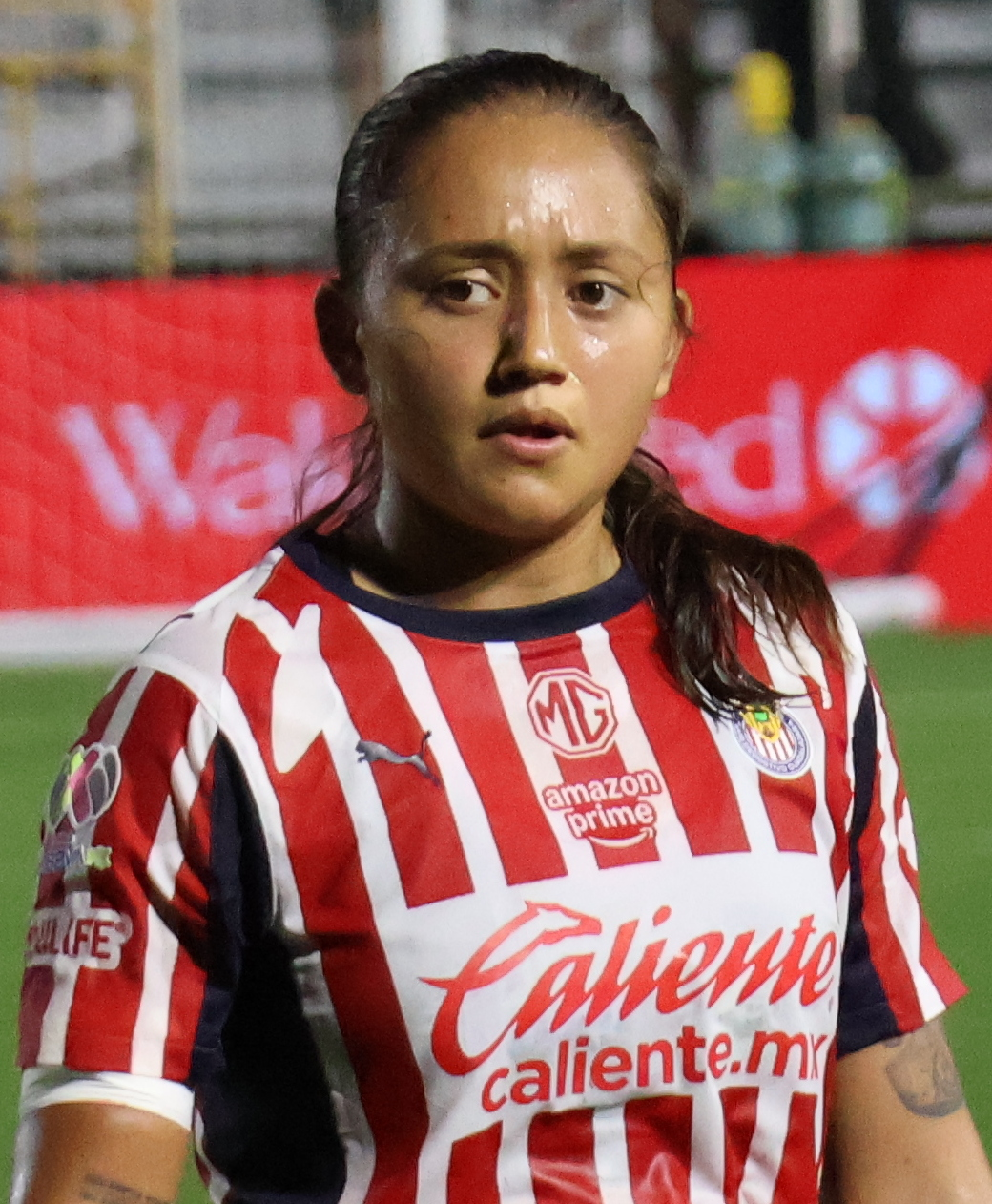
- Guzmán with Guadalajara in 2025

Personal information
- Full name: Kinberly Paloma Guzmán Prado
- Date of birth: 19 September 2002 (age 24)
- Place of birth: Villa Corona, Jalisco, Mexico
- Height: 1.68 m (5 ft 6 in)
- Position: Centre-back

Team information
- Current team: León
- Number: 24

Senior career*
| Years | Team | Apps | (Gls) |
| 2018–2026 | Guadalajara | 107 | (8) |
| 2026– | León | 0 | (0) |

International career^{‡}
| 2022 | Mexico U-20 | | |
- * Club domestic league appearances and goals as of March 2024 ‡ National team caps and goals as of 31 January 2026

Kinberly Paloma Guzmán Prado (born 19 September 2002) is a Mexican professional footballer who plays as a centre-back for Liga MX Femenil club León.

== Career ==
Guzmán was born in Villa Corona, Jalisco on 19 September 2002.

Guzmán started her career in 2018 with Guadalajara. The team, with Guzmán as an important figure, won the league for a second time in the 2021–22 Liga MX Femenil season.

== International career ==
Guzmán was also part of the team that participated in the 2022 FIFA U-20 Women's World Cup in Costa Rica.

== Honours ==
Guadalajara

- Liga MX Femenil: Clausura 2022
