= Victoria López (Mexican footballer) =

Mexican footballer (born 2001)

Personal information
- Full name: Victoria López Quiñonez
- Date of birth: 12 April 2001 (age 25)
- Place of birth: Ensenada, Baja California, Mexico
- Height: 1.61 m (5 ft 3 in)
- Position: Left-back

Team information
- Current team: Toluca
- Number: 13

Senior career*
Years	Team	Apps	(Gls)
2018–2020	Monterrey	33	(1)
2020–2025	Tijuana	87	(1)
2025–	Toluca	23	(2)
- * Club domestic league appearances and goals as of 31 January 2026 ‡ National team caps and goals as of 12 March 2022

Victoria López Quiñonez (born 12 April 2001) is a Mexican professional footballer who plays as an Left-back for Liga MX Femenil side Toluca.

== Career ==
In 2018, she started her career in Monterrey. In 2020, she was transferred to Tijuana. In 2025, she signed with Toluca.
