= Janelly Farías =

Mexican footballer (born 1990)

Personal information
- Full name: Janelly Farías Rodríguez
- Date of birth: 12 February 1990 (age 36)
- Place of birth: Santa Ana, California, U.S.
- Height: 1.72 m (5 ft 8 in)
- Position: Centre-back

Youth career
- 2006: Inland United SC

College career
Years	Team	Apps	(Gls)
2008	New Mexico Lobos		
2011	UC Irvine Anteaters	13	(2)

Senior career*
Years	Team	Apps	(Gls)
2016–2017	San Diego SeaLions	9	(2)
2017	Apollon Ladies		
2019	LA Galaxy OC	1	(0)
2019–2020	Guadalajara	21	(3)
2021–2022	América	66	(9)
2023	Pachuca	26	(2)
2024–2025	Juárez	33	(8)

International career^{‡}
2006	Mexico U-20	3	(0)
2007–2021	Mexico	13	(0)
- * Club domestic league appearances and goals as of 15 July 2019 ‡ National team caps and goals as of 10 April 2021

Janelly Farías Rodríguez (born 12 February 1990) is a former professional footballer who last played as centre-back for Liga MX Femenil club Juárez. She participated in Exatlón Estados Unidos season 1 and was a commentator/analyst for the 2019 FIFA Women's World Cup for Telemundo. She uses her platform to promote inclusivity and advocate for LGBT+ persons. Born in the United States, she represented Mexico at international level.

== Club career ==
After publicly coming out as lesbian while playing college soccer, the rejection she suffered from her family originally led her to quit football. After a few years, however, during which her family gradually reconnected with her and in which she was inspired by the 2015 FIFA Women's World Cup, she made the decision to return to the sport.

On 28 June 2019, Farías joined Liga MX Femenil side CD Guadalajara.

== International career ==
Farías represented Mexico at the 2006 FIFA U-20 Women's World Championship. She made her senior debut on 1 April 2007. She is currently on the full women's Mexico national team and looking to participate in the 2020 Olympic qualifying CONCACAF TOURNAMENT.

== Personal life ==
Farias is openly lesbian. She actively advocates for equality and uses her platform to promote visibility and empowerment for the LGBT+ community. In October 2020, she led a talk for Harvard University titled "Navigating the Borders of Gender, Culture, Language, and Sexuality in Sports and Beyond."
