= Mayra Santana =

Mexican footballer (born 1996)

Personal information
- Full name: Mayra Alejandra Santana Estrada
- Date of birth: 21 December 1996 (age 29)
- Place of birth: Guadalajara, Jalisco, Mexico
- Height: 1.65 m (5 ft 5 in)
- Position: Striker

Senior career*
Years	Team	Apps	(Gls)
2017–2020	Atlas	55	(8)
2020–2022	Querétaro	52	(5)
2023–2024	Atlético San Luis	47	(2)
2024–2026	Santos Laguna	51	(3)
- * Club domestic league appearances and goals as of 5 February 2026 ‡ National team caps and goals as of 12 March 2022

Mayra Santana (born 21 Decemnber 1996) is a Mexican professional footballer who plays as a Striker for Liga MX Femenil side Santos Laguna.

== Career ==
In 2017, she started her career in Atlas. In 2020, she signed with Querétaro. In 2023, she was transferred to Atlético San Luis. In 2024, she joined Santos Laguna.
