= Joseline Montoya =

Mexican football player (born 2000)

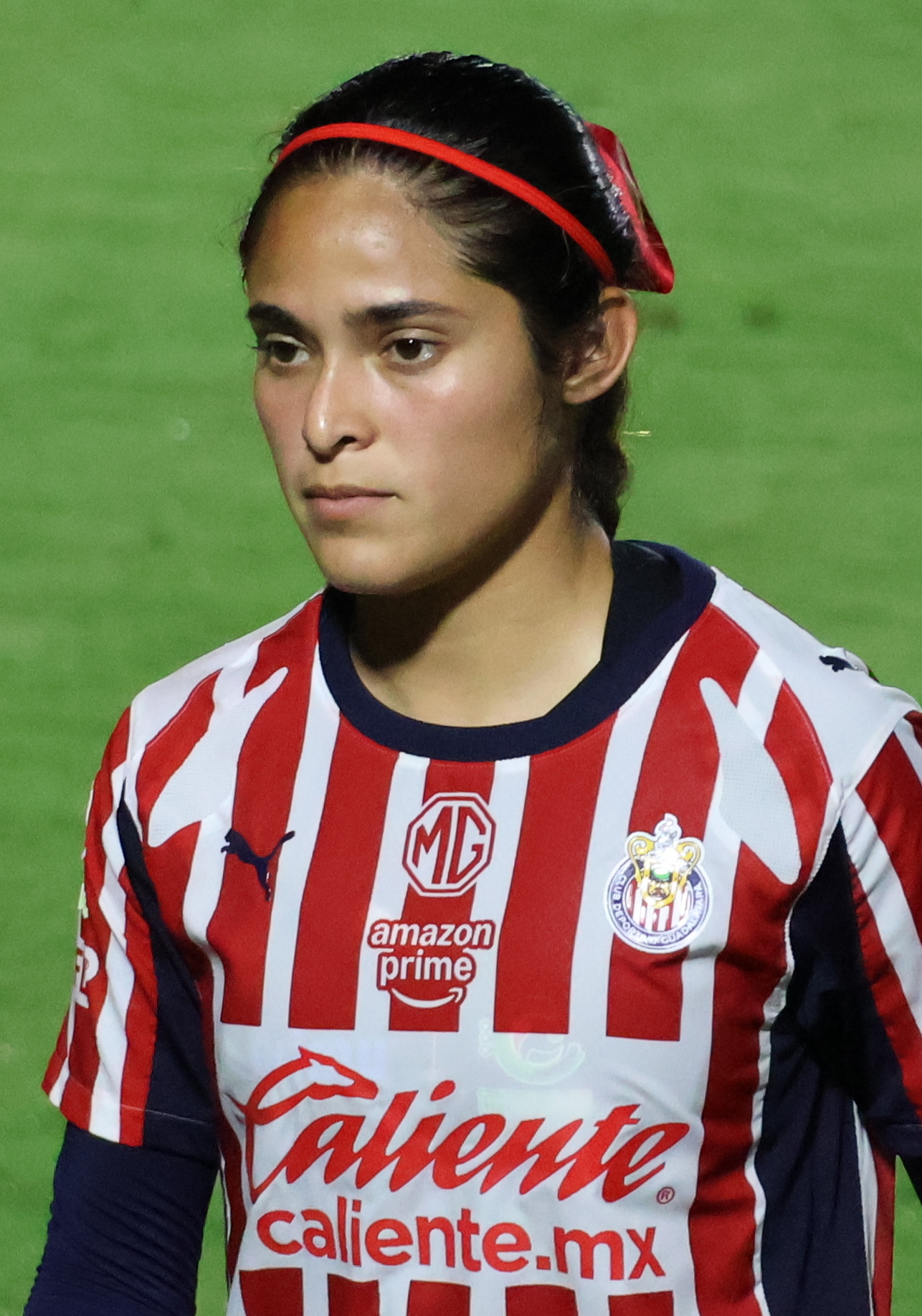
- Montoya with Guadalajara in 2025

Personal information
- Full name: Joseline Montoya Rodríguez
- Date of birth: 3 July 2000 (age 26)
- Place of birth: Guadalajara, Jalisco, Mexico
- Height: 1.58 m (5 ft 2 in)
- Position: Winger

Team information
- Current team: Guadalajara
- Number: 25

Senior career*
Years	Team	Apps	(Gls)
2018–2023	Guadalajara	80	(19)
2023–2025	UANL	39	(1)
2025–	Guadalajara	20	(2)

International career^{‡}
2021–	Mexico	6	(1)
- * Club domestic league appearances and goals as of 1 February 2026 ‡ National team caps and goals as of 25 June 2021

Joseline Montoya Rodríguez (born 3 July 2000) is a Mexican professional footballer who plays as a winger for Liga MX Femenil club Guadalajara.

== Club career ==
In May 2018, Montoya signed with C.D. Guadalajara. In the run-up to the 2018 Apertura, she tore a cruciate ligament in her left knee. This injury sidelined her for nine months. Montoya belatedly made her Liga MX Femenil debut in July 2019.

== International career ==
On 13 June 2021, Montoya made her international debut for Mexico in a 5–1 friendly loss to Japan as an 84th-minute substitute.
