= Daniela Solís =

American-raised Mexican footballer (born 1993)

Personal information
- Full name: Daniela Lizbeth Solís Contreras
- Date of birth: 19 April 1993 (age 33)
- Place of birth: Guadalajara, Jalisco, Mexico
- Height: 1.69 m (5 ft 6 1/2 in)
- Position: Winger

Youth career
- Sherwood High School

College career
| Years | Team | Apps | (Gls) |
| 2011–2012 | Portland State Vikings | 31 | (5) |

Senior career*
| Years | Team | Apps | (Gls) |
| 2017–2024 | Monterrey | 114 | (8) |

International career^{‡}
| 2010 | Mexico U17 | 3 | (1) |
| 2012 | Mexico U20 | 7 | (2) |
| 2013–2017 | Mexico | 5 | (1) |
- * Club domestic league appearances and goals ‡ National team caps and goals as of 13 July 2013

Daniela Lizbeth Solís Contreras (born 19 April 1993) is an American-raised Mexican former footballer who played as a forward for Liga MX Femenil club CF Monterrey. She has been a member of the Mexico women's national team. She now plays for the finished club Las Aliens in the Queens League, sister competition to the Kings League.

== International career ==
Solís represented Mexico at the 2010 FIFA U-17 Women's World Cup, the 2012 CONCACAF Women's U-20 Championship and the 2012 FIFA U-20 Women's World Cup. At senior level, she played the 2013 Summer Universiade.

=== International goals ===
Scores and results list Mexico's goal tally first

| No. | Date | Venue | Opponent | Score | Result | Competition | Ref. |
|---|---|---|---|---|---|---|---|
| 1 | 9 July 2013 | Trudovye Rezervy Stadium, Kazan, Russia | Republic of Ireland | 4–1 | 4–2 | 2013 Summer Universiade | |
