= Ana García (footballer) =

Mexican footballer (born 1994)

Personal information
- Full name: Ana Rosa García López
- Date of birth: 6 May 1994 (age 32)
- Place of birth: Tepic, Nayarit, Mexico
- Height: 1.63 m (5 ft 4 in)
- Position: Attacking midfielder

Team information
- Current team: Cruz Azul
- Number: 28

Senior career*
Years	Team	Apps	(Gls)
2018–2022	Atlas	119	(18)
2022–	Cruz Azul	100	(9)
- * Club domestic league appearances and goals as of 4 June 2023 ‡ National team caps and goals as of 12 March 2022

Ana Rosa García López (born 6 May 1994) is a Mexican professional footballer who plays as a defensive midfielder for Liga Femenil club Cruz Azul.

== Career ==
In 2018, she started her career in Atlas. In 2022, she signed with Cruz Azul.
