= Desirée Monsiváis =

Mexican footballer (born 1988)

Personal information
- Full name: Mónica Desirée Monsiváis Salayandia
- Date of birth: 19 January 1988 (age 38)
- Place of birth: Gómez Palacio, Durango, Mexico
- Height: 1.67 m (5 ft 5 1/2 in)
- Position: Forward

Senior career*
Years	Team	Apps	(Gls)
2014	Toronto Lady Lynx		
2015	BIIK Kazygurt	24	(17)
2017–2023	Monterrey	178	(122)
2022	→ Glasgow City (loan)	4	(0)
2023–2024	UNAM	23	(11)
2024	Juárez	10	(1)

International career
2013–2015	Mexico	5	(3)
- * Club domestic league appearances and goals as of 2 April 2018

Mónica Desirée Monsiváis Salayandia (born 19 January 1988) is a Mexican former professional footballer who last played as a forward for Liga MX Femenil club Juárez.

== Club career ==
In 2014, she played with the Toronto Lady Lynx.

In 2015, Monsiváis played for Kazakhstani side BIIK Kazygurt, where she made 24 appearances and scored 17 goals.

In September 2021, Monsiváis became the first player to have scored 100 goals in Liga MX Femenil.

After playing for C.F. Monterrey since the inception of Liga MX Femenil in 2017, Monsiváis joined Scottish side Glasgow City in July 2022. She made her league debut for Glasgow City as a substitute in a 1–0 victory over Motherwell on 14 August 2022. Monsiváis left Glasgow City by mutual consent after five months with the club.

On 17 December 2024, she announced her retirement.

== International career ==
Monsiváis represented Mexico at the 2016 CONCACAF Women's Olympic Qualifying Championship.

=== International goals ===
Scores and results list Mexico's goal tally first

No.	Date	Venue	Opponent	Score	Result	Competition
1	16 December 2015	Arena das Dunas, Natal, Rio Grande do Norte, Brazil	Trinidad and Tobago	3–0	3–0	2015 International Women's Football Tournament of Natal
2	20 December 2015	Arena das Dunas, Natal, Rio Grande do Norte, Brazil	Trinidad and Tobago	1–0	2–1	2015 International Women's Football Tournament of Natal
