= Club León (women) =

Mexican football club

León Femenil
- Full name: Club León Femenil
- Nicknames: Las Panzas Verdes (The Green Bellies); La Fiera (The Wild Beast); Las Esmeraldas (The Emeralds); Las Verdiblancas (The Green and Whites)
- Founded: 2016; 10 years ago
- Ground: Estadio León; León, Guanajuato
- Capacity: 31,297
- Owner: Grupo Pachuca
- Chairman: Jesús Martínez Murguia
- Manager: Alejandro Corona
- League: Liga Femenil
- Clausura 2026: Regular phase: 13th Final phase: Did not qualify
Home colours	Away colours

Club León Femenil is a Mexican professional women's football club based in León, Guanajuato that competes in the Liga Femenil. The club has been the women's section of Club León since 2017.

== Personnel ==
=== Club administration ===
Position	Staff
Chairman	(Mexico) Jesús Martínez Murguia
Sporting director	(Mexico) Rodrigo Fernández

=== Coaching staff ===
Position	Staff
Manager	(Mexico) Alejandro Corona
Assistant manager	(Mexico) Edwin Santibáñez
Fitness coach	(Mexico) César Andrade
Goalkeeper coach	(Mexico) José Aldo Díaz
Team doctor	(Mexico) María Rabadan
Team doctor assistant	(Mexico) Sonia Torres

== Players ==
=== Current squad ===
As of 31 July 2026

Note: Flags indicate national team as defined under FIFA eligibility rules; some limited exceptions apply. Players may hold more than one non-FIFA nationality.

No.	Pos.	Nation	Player
1	GK	MEX	Nicole Buenfil
2	MF	USA	Marissa García
3	DF	COL	Daniela Arias
4	DF	MEX	Ana Lozada
5	MF	SLV	Danya Gutiérrez
6	DF	MEX	Valeria Razo
7	MF	MEX	Joselyn de la Rosa
9	FW	ECU	Nayely Bolaños
10	MF	URU	Solange Lemos
11	FW	MEX	Cindy Arteaga
12	MF	USA	Chelsea Le
13	GK	CRC	Noelia Bermúdez
14	DF	MEX	Alondra Camargo
15	FW	MEX	Rubí Soto

No.	Pos.	Nation	Player
16	FW	MEX	Mayalu Rausch
17	DF	CHI	Fernanda Pinilla
20	FW	MEX	Luciana Riefkohl
21	DF	MEX	Alexa Hernández
22	DF	MEX	Selene Cortés
23	GK	MEX	Natalia Acuña
24	DF	MEX	Kinberly Guzmán
27	FW	MEX	Itzell Alemán
29	MF	MEX	Karen Jasso
30	DF	MEX	Isabela Esquivias
33	FW	MEX	Yashira Barrientos
34	MF	USA	Vianney Alemán
35	GK	MEX	Alexandra Mendoza
