= 2022 FIFA U-20 Women's World Cup squads =

Football tournament squads

Each country's final squad has to comprise 21 players. The final squads were confirmed by FIFA on 3 August 2022.

== Group A ==
=== Australia ===
A preliminary squad was called up on 18 July 2022 for a pre-tournament camp in Mexico. The final squad was announced on 1 August 2022.

Head coach: Leah Blayney

No.	Pos.	Player	Date of birth (age)	Caps	Goals	Club
1	GK	Sally James	18 October 2002 (aged 19)	2	0	(Football Australia) Melbourne City
2	FW	Charlize Rule	16 February 2003 (aged 19)	1	0	(Football Australia) Sydney FC
3	DF	Naomi Chinnama	13 May 2004 (aged 18)	4	0	(Football Australia) Melbourne City
4	DF	Ella Tonkin	14 December 2002 (aged 19)	4	0	(Football Australia) Adelaide United
5	DF	Jamilla Rankin	9 May 2003 (aged 19)	3	0	(Football Australia) Brisbane Roar
6	MF	Sarah Hunter	7 October 2003 (aged 18)	4	4	(Football Australia) Sydney FC
7	FW	Bryleeh Henry	5 May 2003 (aged 19)	2	0	(Football Australia) Western Sydney Wanderers
8	MF	Hana Lowry	23 April 2003 (aged 19)	3	0	(Football Australia) Perth Glory
9	FW	Cushla Rue	9 July 2003 (aged 19)	2	0	(New Zealand Football) Wellington Phoenix
10	MF	Daniela Galic	17 June 2006 (aged 16)	4	2	(Football Australia) FNSW Institute
11	FW	Kahli Johnson	18 February 2004 (aged 18)	3	2	(Football Australia) Sydney FC
12	GK	Miranda Templeman	3 February 2003 (aged 19)	0	0	(Football Australia) Adelaide United
13	FW	Jynaya Dos Santos	22 September 2005 (aged 16)	3	1	(Football Australia) FNSW Institute
14	MF	Paige Zois	11 October 2003 (aged 18)	2	0	(Football Australia) Melbourne Victory
15	DF	Alexia Apostolakis	16 May 2006 (aged 16)	2	0	(Football Australia) Western Sydney Wanderers
16	DF	Jessika Nash	5 October 2004 (aged 17)	0	0	(Football Australia) Sydney FC
17	FW	Sheridan Gallagher (captain)	2 January 2002 (aged 20)	4	1	(Football Australia) Western Sydney Wanderers
18	GK	Chloe Lincoln	4 January 2005 (aged 17)	2	0	(Football Australia) Canberra United
19	DF	Greta Kraszula	16 May 2002 (aged 20)	1	0	(United States Soccer Federation) Indiana Eleven
20	DF	Kirsty Fenton	6 September 2004 (aged 17)	1	0	(Football Australia) Newcastle Jets
21	FW	Abbey Lemon	14 August 2002 (aged 19)	2	0	(Football Australia) Blacktown Spartans FC

=== Brazil ===
The squad was announced on 27 July 2022. On 1 August 2022, Giovana Queiroz withdrew and was replaced by Mileninha.

Head coach: Jonas Urias

No.	Pos.	Player	Date of birth (age)	Club
1	GK	Gabi Barbieri	7 March 2003 (aged 19)	(Brazilian Football Confederation) Internacional
2	DF	Bruninha	16 June 2002 (aged 20)	(Brazilian Football Confederation) Santos
3	DF	Tarciane	27 May 2003 (aged 19)	(Brazilian Football Confederation) Corinthians
4	DF	Lauren	13 September 2002 (aged 19)	(Royal Spanish Football Federation) Madrid CFF
5	MF	Cris	14 January 2002 (aged 20)	(Brazilian Football Confederation) Flamengo
6	DF	Ana Clara	31 July 2003 (aged 19)	(Brazilian Football Confederation) São Paulo
7	MF	Luany	3 February 2003 (aged 19)	(Brazilian Football Confederation) Grêmio
8	MF	Yaya	23 January 2002 (aged 20)	(Brazilian Football Confederation) São Paulo
9	FW	Priscila	22 August 2004 (aged 17)	(Brazilian Football Confederation) Internacional
10	MF	Analuyza	14 April 2004 (aged 18)	(Brazilian Football Confederation) Santos
11	FW	Aline	7 July 2005 (aged 17)	(Brazilian Football Confederation) Ferroviária
12	GK	Amanda	7 January 2003 (aged 19)	(Brazilian Football Confederation) Atlético Mineiro
13	DF	Pati_Maldaner	8 February 2003 (aged 19)	(Brazilian Football Confederation) Grêmio
14	DF	Sassá	11 February 2003 (aged 19)	(Brazilian Football Confederation) Santos
15	MF	Kaylane Vieira	11 June 2004 (aged 18)	(Brazilian Football Confederation) Flamengo
16	DF	Ravena	30 January 2004 (aged 18)	(Brazilian Football Confederation) São Paulo
17	MF	Gi Fernandes	23 December 2004 (aged 17)	(Brazilian Football Confederation) Santos
18	MF	Rafa_Levis	26 November 2002 (aged 19)	(Brazilian Football Confederation) Grêmio
19	FW	Mileninha	18 March 2003 (aged 19)	(Brazilian Football Confederation) Internacional
20	FW	Dudinha	8 July 2003 (aged 19)	(Brazilian Football Confederation) São Paulo
21	GK	Yanne	7 January 2003 (aged 19)	(Brazilian Football Confederation) Ferroviária

=== Costa Rica ===
A 24-player preliminary squad was announced on 26 July 2022. The final 21-player squad was announced in August 2022. On 6 August 2022, Yirlany Hernández withdrew due to injury.

Head coach: (Venezuela) José Catoya

No.	Pos.	Player	Date of birth (age)	Club
1	GK	Génesis Pérez	4 May 2005 (aged 17)	(Costa Rican Football Federation) Herediano
2	DF	Abigail Sancho	9 January 2003 (aged 19)	(Costa Rican Football Federation) Sporting San José
3	DF	María Paula Porras	18 March 2002 (aged 20)	(Costa Rican Football Federation) Deportivo Saprissa
4	DF	Keilyn Gómez	13 January 2003 (aged 19)	(Costa Rican Football Federation) Herediano
5	MF	Priscilla Rodríguez	26 May 2005 (aged 17)	(Costa Rican Football Federation) Deportivo Saprissa
6	MF	Sianif Agüero	27 January 2004 (aged 18)	(Costa Rican Football Federation) Alajuelense
7	MF	María Paula Arce	9 March 2004 (aged 18)	(Costa Rican Football Federation) Alajuelense
8	MF	Alexandra Pinell	18 October 2002 (aged 19)	(Costa Rican Football Federation) Alajuelense
9	FW	María Paula Salas	12 July 2002 (aged 20)	Free agent
11	FW	Yerling Ovares	17 January 2002 (aged 20)	(Costa Rican Football Federation) Sporting San José
12	DF	Fiama Hidalgo	21 September 2003 (aged 18)	(United States Soccer Federation) Charleston Southern Buccaneers
13	GK	Dayana Pérez	20 March 2003 (aged 19)	(Costa Rican Football Federation) Municipal Pococí
14	MF	Luciana González	14 February 2005 (aged 17)	(Costa Rican Football Federation) Herediano
15	DF	Celeste Jiménez	30 July 2003 (aged 19)	(Costa Rican Football Federation) Herediano
16	DF	Chloe Markey	4 May 2003 (aged 19)	(United States Soccer Federation) Bellarmine Knights
17	MF	Sheika Scott	22 October 2006 (aged 15)	(Costa Rican Football Federation) Municipal Pococí
18	GK	Carolina Méndez	19 July 2004 (aged 18)	(Costa Rican Football Federation) Deportivo Saprissa
19	MF	Mónica Matarrita	7 November 2005 (aged 16)	(Costa Rican Football Federation) Deportivo Saprissa
20	FW	Ángela Mesén	27 May 2003 (aged 19)	(Costa Rican Football Federation) Cariari Pococí
21	MF	Alexa Herrera	16 November 2004 (aged 17)	(Costa Rican Football Federation) Herediano

=== Spain ===
The final squad was announced on 13 July 2022. On 31 July 2022, Elene Lete withdrew due to injury and was replaced by Jana Xin.

Head coach: Pedro López

No.	Pos.	Player	Date of birth (age)	Caps	Goals	Club
1	GK	Adriana Nanclares	9 May 2002 (aged 20)			(Royal Spanish Football Federation) Real Sociedad
2	FW	Carmen Álvarez	24 February 2003 (aged 19)			(Royal Spanish Football Federation) Atlético Madrid
3	DF	Ana Tejada	2 June 2002 (aged 20)			(Royal Spanish Football Federation) Real Sociedad
4	DF	Sonia García Majarín	6 December 2002 (aged 19)			(Royal Spanish Football Federation) Atlético Madrid
5	DF	Andrea Medina	11 May 2004 (aged 18)			(Royal Spanish Football Federation) Atlético Madrid
6	MF	Ariadna Mingueza	22 March 2003 (aged 19)			(Royal Spanish Football Federation) Barcelona
7	FW	Ornella María Vignola	30 September 2004 (aged 17)			(Royal Spanish Football Federation) Barcelona
8	MF	Silvia Lloris	15 May 2004 (aged 18)			(Royal Spanish Football Federation) Levante
9	MF	Inma Gabarro	5 November 2002 (aged 19)			(Royal Spanish Football Federation) Sevilla
10	MF	Júlia Bartel	18 May 2004 (aged 18)			(Royal Spanish Football Federation) Barcelona
11	FW	Salma Paralluelo	13 November 2003 (aged 18)			(Royal Spanish Football Federation) Barcelona
12	DF	Esther Laborde	20 April 2004 (aged 18)			(Royal Spanish Football Federation) Barcelona
13	GK	Meritxell Font	10 December 2004 (aged 17)			(Royal Spanish Football Federation) Barcelona
14	FW	Fiamma Benítez	19 June 2004 (aged 18)			(Royal Spanish Football Federation) Levante
15	MF	Clara Pinedo	9 September 2003 (aged 18)			(Royal Spanish Football Federation) Athletic Bilbao
16	MF	Maite Zubieta	28 May 2004 (aged 18)			(Royal Spanish Football Federation) Athletic Bilbao
17	FW	Mirari Uria	1 January 2003 (aged 19)			(Royal Spanish Football Federation) Real Sociedad
18	DF	Izarne Sarasola	12 February 2002 (aged 20)			(Royal Spanish Football Federation) Real Sociedad
19	DF	Ane Elexpuru	2 May 2003 (aged 19)			(Royal Spanish Football Federation) Athletic Bilbao
20	FW	Asun Martínez	20 February 2002 (aged 20)			(Royal Spanish Football Federation) Valencia
21	GK	Jana Xin	29 September 2003 (aged 18)			(Royal Spanish Football Federation) Alavés

== Group B ==
=== Colombia ===
The final 21-player squad was announced on 2 August 2022.

Head coach: Carlos Paniagua

No.	Pos.	Player	Date of birth (age)	Club
1	GK	Natalia Giraldo	19 May 2003 (aged 19)	(Colombian Football Federation) América de Cali
2	DF	Mary Espitaleta	22 August 2005 (aged 16)	(Colombian Football Federation) Independiente Medellín
3	DF	Ángela Barón	18 September 2003 (aged 18)	(United States Soccer Federation) D'Feeters Kicks
4	DF	Yunaira López	4 December 2004 (aged 17)	(Colombian Football Federation) Independiente Medellín
5	DF	Stefania Perlaza	25 September 2005 (aged 16)	(Colombian Football Federation) Deportivo Cali
6	MF	Ilana Izquierdo	14 June 2002 (aged 20)	(United States Soccer Federation) Pensacola FC
7	FW	Gisela Robledo	13 May 2003 (aged 19)	(Royal Spanish Football Federation) UDG Tenerife
8	MF	María Camila Reyes	11 May 2002 (aged 20)	(Colombian Football Federation) Independiente Santa Fe
9	MF	Gabriela Rodríguez	10 May 2005 (aged 17)	(Colombian Football Federation) América de Cali
10	MF	Liced Serna	1 February 2002 (aged 20)	(Colombian Football Federation) Independiente Medellín
11	FW	Linda Caicedo	22 February 2005 (aged 17)	(Colombian Football Federation) Deportivo Cali
12	GK	Valentina González	7 February 2002 (aged 20)	(Colombian Football Federation) La Equidad
13	DF	Ana María Guzmán	11 June 2005 (aged 17)	(Colombian Football Federation) Deportivo Pereira
14	MF	Mariana Muñoz	2 January 2003 (aged 19)	(Colombian Football Federation) Atlético Nacional
15	FW	Karla Torres	11 October 2006 (aged 15)	(Colombian Football Federation) Independiente Santa Fe
16	MF	Juana Ortegón	6 August 2006 (aged 16)	(Colombian Football Federation) Deportivo Cali
17	DF	Kelly Caicedo	26 November 2002 (aged 19)	(Colombian Football Federation) Deportivo Cali
18	FW	Ingrid Guerra	2 April 2003 (aged 19)	(Colombian Football Federation) Deportivo Cali
19	FW	Yirleidys Minota	10 November 2002 (aged 19)	(Colombian Football Federation) Independiente Medellín
20	FW	Wendy Bonilla	8 July 2002 (aged 20)	(Colombian Football Federation) América de Cali
21	GK	Valery Restrepo	10 September 2004 (aged 17)	(Colombian Football Federation) Independiente Medellín

=== Germany ===
A 23-player preliminary squad was announced on 14 July 2022. The final 21-player squad was announced on 1 August 2022.

Head coach: Kathrin Peter

No.	Pos.	Player	Date of birth (age)	Caps	Goals	Club
1	GK	Julia Kassen	17 May 2002 (aged 20)	3	0	(German Football Association) VfL Wolfsburg
2	DF	Jenny Beyer	22 April 2002 (aged 20)	1	0	(United States Soccer Federation) Colorado Buffaloes
3	DF	Miriam Hils	11 March 2004 (aged 18)	3	0	(German Football Association) SGS Essen
4	DF	Madeleine Steck	31 January 2002 (aged 20)	4	0	(German Football Association) Eintracht Frankfurt
5	DF	Vanessa Diehm	22 March 2004 (aged 18)	3	0	(German Football Association) 1899 Hoffenheim
6	MF	Lisanne Gräwe	11 February 2003 (aged 19)	4	0	(German Football Association) Bayer Leverkusen
7	FW	Maja Sternad	28 December 2003 (aged 18)	4	1	(German Football Association) Werder Bremen
8	MF	Pauline Machtens	28 June 2002 (aged 20)	4	1	(United States Soccer Federation) Syracuse Orange
9	FW	Sophie Weidauer	10 February 2002 (aged 20)	3	1	(German Football Association) Turbine Potsdam
10	MF	Gia Corley	20 May 2002 (aged 20)	3	0	(German Football Association) 1899 Hoffenheim
11	FW	Carlotta Wamser	1 November 2003 (aged 18)	3	0	(German Football Association) Eintracht Frankfurt
12	GK	Pauline Nelles	21 January 2002 (aged 20)	1	0	(United States Soccer Federation) Arizona State Sun Devils
13	DF	Nina Zimmer	16 July 2003 (aged 19)	3	0	(United States Soccer Federation) NC State Wolfpack
14	DF	Clara Fröhlich	15 March 2004 (aged 18)	1	0	(German Football Association) Bayer Leverkusen
15	MF	Selina Vobian	27 September 2002 (aged 19)	3	1	(German Football Association) SC Freiburg
16	FW	Sarah Mattner-Trembleau	11 May 2003 (aged 19)	0	0	(Austrian Football Association) First Vienna
17	FW	Cora Zicai	29 November 2004 (aged 17)	3	0	(German Football Association) SC Freiburg
18	FW	Tuana Keles	3 March 2003 (aged 19)	1	0	(German Football Association) Werder Bremen
19	DF	Beke Sterner	22 February 2003 (aged 19)	3	0	(German Football Association) SGS Essen
20	FW	Laureta Elmazi	26 June 2003 (aged 19)	0	0	(German Football Association) SGS Essen
21	GK	Ena Mahmutovic	23 December 2003 (aged 18)	0	0	(German Football Association) MSV Duisburg

=== Mexico ===
The final squad was announced on 2 August 2022.

Head coach: Ana Galindo

No.	Pos.	Player	Date of birth (age)	Club
1	GK	Celeste Espino	9 August 2003 (aged 19)	(Mexican Football Federation) Guadalajara
2	DF	Daniela Monroy	21 September 2002 (aged 19)	(Mexican Football Federation) Cruz Azul
3	DF	Carol Cázares	14 June 2003 (aged 19)	Free agent
4	DF	Kinberly Guzmán (captain)	19 September 2002 (aged 19)	(Mexican Football Federation) Guadalajara
5	DF	Alexxandra Ramírez	23 May 2002 (aged 20)	(Mexican Football Federation) Santos Laguna
6	DF	Jana Gutiérrez	25 October 2003 (aged 18)	(Mexican Football Federation) Tigres UANL
7	MF	Natalia Mauleón	4 February 2002 (aged 20)	(Mexican Football Federation) América
8	MF	Daniela Delgado	27 September 2002 (aged 19)	(Mexican Football Federation) Santos Laguna
9	FW	Alexia Villanueva	22 February 2003 (aged 19)	(Mexican Football Federation) Santos Laguna
10	MF	Anette Vázquez	11 March 2002 (aged 20)	(Mexican Football Federation) Guadalajara
11	MF	Bridgette Marín	10 May 2004 (aged 18)	(United States Soccer Federation) PSV Union
12	GK	Paola Manrique	28 April 2002 (aged 20)	(Mexican Football Federation) Pachuca
13	DF	Samantha López	16 April 2003 (aged 19)	(Mexican Football Federation) Pumas UNAM
14	DF	Fernanda Canseco	7 April 2004 (aged 18)	(Mexican Football Federation) Pachuca
15	MF	Alice Soto	26 March 2006 (aged 16)	(Mexican Football Federation) Pachuca
16	MF	Isabella Gutiérrez	9 March 2004 (aged 18)	(United States Soccer Federation) East Carolina Pirates
17	MF	Maritza Maldonado	26 May 2002 (aged 20)	(Mexican Football Federation) Querétaro
18	MF	Blanky Serrano	29 October 2004 (aged 17)	(Mexican Football Federation) Pachuca
19	FW	América Frías	19 January 2004 (aged 18)	(United States Soccer Federation) FC Bay Area Surf
20	MF	Paola Chavero	16 May 2002 (aged 20)	(Mexican Football Federation) Pumas UNAM
21	GK	Natalia Acuña	3 July 2002 (aged 20)	(Mexican Football Federation) Tijuana

=== New Zealand ===
The squad was announced on 26 July 2022. Kate Duncan withdrew due to injury.

Head coach: (Wales) Gemma Lewis

No.	Pos.	Player	Date of birth (age)	Club
1	GK	Brianna Edwards	27 January 2003 (age 23)	(Football Australia) Bankstown City Lions
2	DF	Zoe McMeeken	11 March 2004 (age 22)	Free agent
3	DF	Kate Taylor (captain)	21 October 2003 (age 23)	Free agent
4	DF	Te Reremoana Walker	6 November 2003 (age 23)	Free agent
5	DF	Marisa van der Meer	27 March 2002 (age 24)	Free agent
6	MF	Aniela Jensen	22 January 2002 (age 24)	(United States Soccer Federation) Pacific Tigers
7	FW	Tupelo Dugan	20 October 2002 (age 24)	Free agent
8	MF	Grace Wisnewski	28 June 2002 (age 24)	Free agent
9	FW	Ava Pritchard	21 March 2003 (age 23)	Free agent
10	MF	Alyssa Whinham	26 October 2003 (age 23)	Free agent
11	DF	Charlotte Lancaster	8 November 2003 (age 23)	Free agent
12	FW	Ava Collins	18 April 2002 (age 24)	(United States Soccer Federation) St. John's Red Storm
13	MF	Emma Pijnenburg	13 September 2004 (age 22)	(New Zealand Football) Western Springs
14	FW	Milly Clegg	1 November 2005 (age 21)	(New Zealand Football) Auckland United
15	MF	Charlotte Wilford-Carroll	23 May 2002 (age 24)	(New Zealand Football) Eastern Suburbs
16	FW	Ruby Nathan	11 October 2005 (age 21)	(New Zealand Football) Auckland United
17	MF	Ella Findlay	3 February 2004 (age 22)	(New Zealand Football) Eastern Suburbs
18	GK	Murphy Sheaff	12 September 2003 (age 23)	(United States Soccer Federation) Jacksonville Dolphins
19	MF	Macey Fraser	11 July 2002 (age 24)	(New Zealand Football) Wellington Phoenix Academy
20	DF	Jana Niedermayr	16 February 2003 (age 23)	(New Zealand Football) Eastern Suburbs
21	GK	Rylee Godbold	27 June 2003 (age 23)	Free agent

== Group C ==
=== Canada ===
The squad was announced on 22 July 2022.

Head coach: Cindy Tye

No.	Pos.	Player	Date of birth (age)	Club
1	GK	Anna Karpenko	10 April 2002 (aged 20)	(United States Soccer Federation) Harvard Crimson
2	DF	Zoe Burns	5 January 2002 (aged 20)	(United States Soccer Federation) USC Trojans
3	DF	Mia Pante	25 March 2003 (aged 19)	(United States Soccer Federation) Texas A&M Aggies
4	DF	Jade Rose	12 February 2003 (aged 19)	(United States Soccer Federation) Harvard Crimson
5	DF	Annika Leslie	22 April 2003 (aged 19)	(United States Soccer Federation) West Virginia Mountaineers
6	MF	Maya Ladhani	6 September 2002 (aged 19)	(Norwegian Football Federation) Avaldsnes
7	FW	Florianne Jourde	5 November 2004 (aged 17)	(Canadian Soccer Association) NDC-CDN Québec
8	MF	Sonia Walk	12 August 2002 (aged 19)	(United States Soccer Federation) Boston College Eagles
9	FW	Miya Grant-Clavijo	17 June 2003 (aged 19)	(United States Soccer Federation) Brown Bears
10	MF	Nikayla Small	24 March 2003 (aged 19)	(United States Soccer Federation) Wake Forest Demon Deacons
11	FW	Kaila Novak	24 March 2002 (aged 20)	(United States Soccer Federation) UCLA Bruins
12	DF	Vivianne Bessette	23 June 2002 (aged 20)	(United States Soccer Federation) South Florida Bulls
13	MF	Simi Awujo	23 September 2003 (aged 18)	(United States Soccer Federation) USC Trojans
14	DF	Brooklyn Courtnall	28 December 2002 (aged 19)	(United States Soccer Federation) USC Trojans
15	DF	Élisabeth Tsé	7 December 2002 (aged 19)	(United States Soccer Federation) SMU Mustangs
16	MF	Keera Melenhorst	2 May 2003 (aged 19)	(United States Soccer Federation) Pittsburgh Panthers
17	MF	Holly Ward	25 October 2003 (aged 18)	(United States Soccer Federation) Texas Longhorns
18	MF	Olivia Smith	5 August 2004 (aged 18)	(United States Soccer Federation) Florida State Seminoles
19	FW	Serita Thurton	16 January 2002 (aged 20)	(United States Soccer Federation) South Florida Bulls
20	GK	Sierra Giorgio	9 October 2003 (aged 18)	(United States Soccer Federation) Syracuse Orange
21	GK	Coralie Lallier	26 May 2005 (aged 17)	(Canadian Soccer Association) NDC-CDN Québec

=== France ===
The squad was announced on 18 July 2022.

Head coach: Sonia Haziraj

No.	Pos.	Player	Date of birth (age)	Caps	Goals	Club
1	GK	Marie-Morgane Sieber	15 July 2002 (aged 20)	3	0	(French Football Federation) Rodez
2	DF	Célina Ould Hocine	3 February 2002 (aged 20)	4	1	(French Football Federation) Paris FC
3	DF	Lou Bogaert	25 June 2004 (aged 18)	3	0	(French Football Federation) Paris FC
4	DF	Alice Sombath	16 October 2003 (aged 18)	6	0	(French Football Federation) Lyon
5	DF	Kysha Sylla	4 February 2004 (aged 18)	3	0	(French Football Federation) Lyon
6	MF	Cyrielle Blanc	23 January 2003 (aged 19)	6	0	(French Football Federation) Montpellier
7	FW	Esther Mbakem-Niaro	7 January 2002 (aged 20)	10	2	(French Football Federation) Montpellier
8	MF	Laurina Fazer (captain)	13 October 2003 (aged 18)	3	0	(French Football Federation) Paris Saint-Germain
9	FW	Hawa Sangaré	20 July 2002 (aged 20)	2	0	(French Football Federation) Paris Saint-Germain
10	MF	Magnaba Folquet	3 November 2003 (aged 18)	4	0	(French Football Federation) Paris Saint-Germain
11	FW	Vicki Becho	3 October 2003 (aged 18)	7	1	(French Football Federation) Lyon
12	FW	Jade Nassi	26 April 2003 (aged 19)	4	1	(French Football Federation) Nantes
13	FW	Yrma Mze Issa	26 October 2003 (aged 18)	4	2	(French Football Federation) Marseille
14	DF	Annaëlle Tchakounté	25 August 2003 (aged 18)	7	0	(French Football Federation) Paris FC
15	DF	Thiniba Samoura	11 February 2004 (aged 18)	2	0	(French Football Federation) Paris FC
16	GK	Marie Petiteau	12 June 2002 (aged 20)	7	0	(French Football Federation) Saint-Malo
17	MF	Océane Hurtré	17 February 2004 (aged 18)	3	0	(French Football Federation) Paris Saint-Germain
18	DF	Jade Le Guilly	18 June 2002 (aged 20)	7	0	(French Football Federation) Paris Saint-Germain
19	FW	Manssita Traoré	9 September 2003 (aged 18)	6	0	(French Football Federation) Paris Saint-Germain
20	MF	Mégane Hoeltzel	21 April 2003 (aged 19)	4	1	(French Football Federation) Strasbourg
21	GK	Océane Toussaint	20 February 2004 (aged 18)	0	0	(French Football Federation) Paris Saint-Germain

=== Nigeria ===
A 30-player preliminary squad was announced on 25 June 2022. The final squad was announced in August 2022.

Head coach: Christopher Danjuma

No.	Pos.	Player	Date of birth (age)	Club
1	GK	Monle Oyono	30 November 2002 (aged 19)	(Nigeria Football Federation) Bayelsa Queens
2	DF	Chidinma Ogbuchi	28 December 2003 (aged 18)	(Nigeria Football Federation) Robo Queens
3	MF	Adoo Yina	30 December 2004 (aged 17)	(Nigeria Football Federation) Nasarawa Amazons
4	MF	Deborah Abiodun	2 November 2003 (aged 18)	(Nigeria Football Federation) Rivers Angels
5	DF	Oluwatosin Demehin (captain)	13 March 2002 (aged 20)	(Nigeria Football Federation) Rivers Angels
6	DF	Omowunmi Oshobukola	10 December 2002 (aged 19)	(Nigeria Football Federation) Edo Queens
7	FW	Chiamaka Okwuchukwu	7 August 2005 (aged 17)	(Nigeria Football Federation) Rivers Angels
8	MF	Esther Onyenezide	30 June 2003 (aged 19)	(Nigeria Football Federation) Robo Queens
9	FW	Flourish Sabastine	20 October 2004 (aged 17)	Free agent
10	FW	Blessing Okpe	1 October 2003 (aged 18)	(Nigeria Football Federation) Rivers Angels
11	MF	Bashirat Amoo	6 June 2002 (aged 20)	(Nigeria Football Federation) Nasarawa Amazons
12	DF	Oluchi Ohaegbulem	18 October 2006 (aged 15)	(Nigeria Football Federation) Confluence Queens
13	FW	Mercy Idoko	29 December 2002 (aged 19)	(Nigeria Football Federation) Nasarawa Amazons
14	DF	Rofiat Imuran	17 June 2004 (aged 18)	(Nigeria Football Federation) Rivers Angels
15	FW	Chioma Olise	16 March 2005 (aged 17)	(Nigeria Football Federation) Edo Queens
16	GK	Nelly Ekeh	6 January 2003 (aged 19)	(Nigeria Football Federation) Sunshine Queens
17	DF	Jumoke Alani	17 July 2005 (aged 17)	(Nigeria Football Federation) Edo Queens
18	MF	Motunrayo Ezekiel	30 May 2003 (aged 19)	(Nigeria Football Federation) Naija Ratels
19	MF	Chinyere Kalu	23 October 2005 (aged 16)	(Nigeria Football Federation) Nasarawa Amazons
20	FW	Joy Jerry	25 November 2002 (aged 19)	(Nigeria Football Federation) Bayelsa Queens
21	GK	Peace Obidinma	11 November 2002 (aged 19)	(Nigeria Football Federation) Edo Queens

=== South Korea ===
The final squad was announced on 14 July 2022.

Head coach: Hwang In-sun

No.	Pos.	Player	Date of birth (age)	Club
1	GK	Do Yoon-ji	10 March 2002 (aged 20)	(Korea Football Association) Dankook University
2	DF	Been Hyeon-jin	12 January 2002 (aged 20)	(Korea Football Association) Uiduk University
3	DF	Lee Jung-yeon	9 May 2002 (aged 20)	(Korea Football Association) Uiduk University
4	DF	Kim Min-ji	21 August 2003 (aged 18)	(Korea Football Association) Daeduk College
5	DF	Lee Su-in	30 April 2002 (aged 20)	(Korea Football Association) Korea University Sejong
6	DF	Lee Da-yeon	8 February 2002 (aged 20)	(Korea Football Association) Daeduk College
7	MF	Kim Myeong-jin	20 December 2002 (aged 19)	(Korea Football Association) Korea University Sejong
8	MF	Kim Eun-ju	19 March 2002 (aged 20)	(Korea Football Association) Ulsan College
9	FW	Go Yu-na	16 November 2002 (aged 19)	(Korea Football Association) Ulsan College
10	FW	Chun Ga-ram	13 April 2002 (aged 20)	(Korea Football Association) Tongwon University
11	FW	Lee Eun-young	31 March 2002 (aged 20)	(Korea Football Association) Korea University Sejong
12	MF	Lee Se-ran	13 April 2002 (aged 20)	(Korea Football Association) Korea University Sejong
13	FW	Ko Da-yeong	24 July 2002 (aged 20)	(Korea Football Association) Daeduk College
14	MF	Bae Ye-bin	7 December 2004 (aged 17)	(Korea Football Association) Gyeongbuk Pohang High School
15	FW	Seo Hyeon-min	20 May 2002 (aged 20)	(Korea Football Association) Korea University Sejong
16	DF	Han Da-in	9 February 2002 (aged 20)	(Korea Football Association) Korea University Sejong
17	FW	Jeon Yu-gyeong	20 January 2004 (aged 18)	(Korea Football Association) Gyeongbuk Pohang High School
18	GK	Kim Kyeong-hee	17 March 2003 (aged 19)	(Korea Football Association) Changnyeong WFC
19	MF	Won Chae-eun	16 June 2005 (aged 17)	(Korea Football Association) Hyundai High School
20	DF	Mun Ha-yeon	27 May 2002 (aged 20)	(Korea Football Association) Gangwon State University
21	GK	Woo Seo-bin	13 April 2004 (aged 18)	(Korea Football Association) Gyeongbuk Pohang High School

== Group D ==
=== Ghana ===
A 23-player preliminary squad was announced on 26 July 2022. The final 21-player squad was announced in August 2022.

Head coach: Ben Fokuo

No.	Pos.	Player	Date of birth (age)	Club
1	GK	Cynthia Konlan	29 November 2002 (aged 19)	(Ghana Football Association) Pearl Pia Ladies
2	DF	Abena Opoku	10 January 2004 (aged 18)	(Ghana Football Association) Ampem Darkoa Ladies
3	DF	Ayisha Yakubu	5 September 2003 (aged 18)	(Ghana Football Association) Pearl Pia Ladies
4	DF	Rebecca Atinga	6 May 2002 (aged 20)	(Ghana Football Association) Prison Ladies
5	DF	Susan Duah	3 February 2002 (aged 20)	(Norwegian Football Federation) Avaldsnes
6	MF	Jacqueline Owusu	12 June 2002 (aged 20)	(Israel Football Association) Maccabi Emek Hefer
7	MF	Suzzy Teye	6 November 2002 (aged 19)	(Ghana Football Association) Lady Strikers
8	FW	Mukarama Abdulai	10 October 2002 (aged 19)	(Royal Spanish Football Federation) Alavés
9	FW	Doris Boaduwaa	24 December 2002 (aged 19)	(Ghana Football Association) Hasaacas Ladies
10	MF	Evelyn Badu (captain)	11 September 2002 (aged 19)	(Norwegian Football Federation) Avaldsnes
11	MF	Rahama Jafaru	17 March 2002 (aged 20)	(Ghana Football Association) Northern Ladies
12	DF	Anasthesia Achiaa	20 December 2003 (aged 18)	(Ghana Football Association) Ampem Darkoa Ladies
13	FW	Salamatu Abdulai	27 November 2004 (aged 17)	(Ghana Football Association) Northern Ladies
14	MF	Azumah Bugre	15 December 2002 (aged 19)	(Swedish Football Association) Norrköping
15	FW	Ophelia Amponsah	10 October 2003 (aged 18)	(Ghana Football Association) Ampem Darkoa Ladies
16	GK	Grace Buoadu	15 January 2002 (aged 20)	(Ghana Football Association) Hasaacas Ladies
17	FW	Sharon Sampson	14 October 2002 (aged 19)	(United States Soccer Federation) Oakland Golden Grizzlies
18	MF	Mafia Nyame	7 October 2004 (aged 17)	(Ghana Football Association) Faith Ladies
19	DF	Louisa Aniwaa	4 April 2003 (aged 19)	(Ghana Football Association) Police Ladies
20	MF	Cecilia Nyama	15 August 2003 (aged 18)	(Ghana Football Association) Ridge City Women
21	GK	Farahana Ziblim	24 May 2003 (aged 19)	(Ghana Football Association) Prison Ladies

=== Japan ===
A preliminary squad was announced on 4 July 2022. The final squad was announced on 12 July 2022. On 27 July 2022, Akari Takeshige withdrew due to injury and was replaced by Manaka Hayashi.

Head coach: Futoshi Ikeda

No.	Pos.	Player	Date of birth (age)	Club
1	GK	Shiori Fukuda	13 June 2002 (aged 20)	(Japan Football Association) Urawa Red Diamonds
2	DF	Akane Nishino	4 February 2002 (aged 20)	(Japan Football Association) MyNavi Sendai
3	DF	Ibuki Nagae	3 March 2002 (aged 20)	(Japan Football Association) AC Nagano Parceiro
4	DF	Rion Ishikawa	4 July 2003 (aged 19)	(Japan Football Association) Urawa Red Diamonds
5	DF	Manaka Hayashi	16 August 2004 (aged 17)	(Japan Football Association) JFA Academy Fukushima
6	MF	Aemu Oyama	19 August 2004 (aged 17)	(Japan Football Association) Tokyo Verdy Menina
7	DF	Mihoshi Sugisawa	17 August 2002 (aged 19)	(Japan Football Association) Omiya Ardija Ventus
8	MF	Kokona Iwasaki	8 October 2002 (aged 19)	(Japan Football Association) Tokyo Verdy Beleza
9	FW	Yuzuki Yamamoto	1 September 2002 (aged 19)	(Japan Football Association) Tokyo Verdy Beleza
10	FW	Aoba Fujino	27 January 2004 (aged 18)	(Japan Football Association) Tokyo Verdy Beleza
11	FW	Maika Hamano	9 May 2004 (aged 18)	(Japan Football Association) INAC Kobe Leonessa
12	DF	Haruna Tabata	27 May 2002 (aged 20)	(Japan Football Association) Cerezo Osaka Sakai
13	FW	Mei Shimada	8 May 2002 (aged 20)	(Japan Football Association) Urawa Red Diamonds
14	MF	Manaka Matsukubo	28 July 2004 (aged 18)	(Japan Football Association) JFA Academy Fukushima
15	MF	Suzu Amano	18 February 2004 (aged 18)	(Japan Football Association) INAC Kobe Leonessa
16	DF	Shinomi Koyama	3 March 2002 (aged 20)	(Japan Football Association) Cerezo Osaka Sakai
17	FW	Maya Hijikata	13 April 2004 (aged 18)	(Japan Football Association) Tokyo Verdy Menina
18	GK	Shu Oba	11 July 2002 (aged 20)	(United States Soccer Federation) East Tennessee State Buccaneers
19	MF	Riko Yoshida	18 June 2002 (aged 20)	(Japan Football Association) Nittaidai SMG Yokohama
20	MF	Urara Watanabe	8 April 2002 (aged 20)	(Japan Football Association) Nittaidai SMG Yokohama
21	GK	Nina Noda	5 September 2003 (aged 18)	(Japan Football Association) Tokyo Verdy Beleza

=== Netherlands ===
The final squad was announced on 22 July 2022.

Head coach: Jessica Torny

No.	Pos.	Player	Date of birth (age)	Club
1	GK	Claire Dinkla	22 June 2002 (aged 20)	(Royal Dutch Football Association) Fortuna Sittard
2	DF	Kim Everaerts	6 January 2002 (aged 20)	(Royal Dutch Football Association) FC Twente
3	DF	Marit Auée	11 January 2002 (aged 20)	(Royal Dutch Football Association) FC Twente
4	DF	Samantha van Diemen	28 January 2002 (aged 20)	(Royal Dutch Football Association) Fortuna Sittard
5	DF	Nina Nijstad	5 March 2003 (aged 19)	(Royal Dutch Football Association) SC Heerenveen
6	MF	Dana Foederer	27 July 2002 (aged 20)	(Royal Dutch Football Association) Fortuna Sittard
7	FW	Liz Rijsbergen	14 February 2002 (aged 20)	(Royal Dutch Football Association) ADO Den Haag
8	MF	Ella Peddemors	6 August 2002 (aged 20)	(Royal Dutch Football Association) FC Twente
9	FW	Sanne Koopman	15 November 2002 (aged 19)	(Royal Dutch Football Association) Feyenoord
10	MF	Danique Noordman	21 February 2004 (aged 18)	(Royal Dutch Football Association) PEC Zwolle
11	FW	Ziva Henry	31 May 2004 (aged 18)	(Royal Dutch Football Association) AFC Ajax
12	MF	Tess van Bentem	3 March 2003 (aged 19)	(Royal Dutch Football Association) PEC Zwolle
13	DF	Fenna Meijer	7 February 2003 (aged 19)	(Royal Dutch Football Association) SC Heerenveen
14	DF	Senna Koeleman	14 July 2003 (aged 19)	(Royal Dutch Football Association) PSV Eindhoven
15	DF	Jeva Walk	18 January 2004 (aged 18)	(Royal Dutch Football Association) PEC Zwolle
16	GK	Lisan Alkemade	23 July 2002 (aged 20)	(Royal Dutch Football Association) PSV Eindhoven
17	FW	Zera Hulswit	29 April 2003 (aged 19)	(Royal Dutch Football Association) PSV Eindhoven
18	FW	Shi-jona Martina	14 November 2004 (aged 17)	(Royal Dutch Football Association) PSV Eindhoven
19	FW	Charlotte Hulst	22 April 2003 (aged 19)	(Royal Dutch Football Association) Fortuna Sittard
20	MF	Rosa van Gool	9 February 2002 (aged 20)	(Royal Dutch Football Association) AFC Ajax
21	GK	Femke Liefting	2 January 2005 (aged 17)	(Royal Dutch Football Association) VV Alkmaar

=== United States ===
The squad was announced on 25 July 2022. On August 11, 2022, Sally Menti withdrew due to injury and was replaced by Annie Karich.

Head coach: (England) Tracey Kevins

No.	Pos.	Player	Date of birth (age)	Caps	Goals	Club
1	GK	Mia Justus	3 September 2002 (aged 19)	6	0	(United States Soccer Federation) Florida State Seminoles
2	DF	Laney Rouse	31 August 2002 (aged 19)	7	0	(United States Soccer Federation) Virginia Cavaliers
3	DF	Ayo Oke	5 April 2003 (aged 19)	9	0	(United States Soccer Federation) California Golden Bears
4	DF	Emily Mason	23 October 2002 (aged 19)	15	3	(United States Soccer Federation) Rutgers Scarlet Knights
5	DF	Lilly Reale	12 August 2003 (aged 18)	7	1	(United States Soccer Federation) UCLA Bruins
6	MF	Talia DellaPeruta	19 April 2002 (aged 20)	19	5	(United States Soccer Federation) North Carolina Tar Heels
7	FW	Alyssa Thompson	7 November 2004 (aged 17)	5	3	(United States Soccer Federation) Total Futbol Academy
8	FW	Andrea Kitahata	1 January 2003 (aged 19)	6	7	(United States Soccer Federation) Stanford Cardinal
9	FW	Michelle Cooper	4 December 2002 (aged 19)	7	8	(United States Soccer Federation) Duke Blue Devils
10	FW	Jaedyn Shaw	20 November 2004 (aged 17)	4	3	(United States Soccer Federation) San Diego Wave
11	FW	Simone Jackson	28 January 2003 (aged 19)	9	7	(United States Soccer Federation) USC Trojans
12	GK	Neeku Purcell	7 October 2003 (aged 18)	6	0	(United States Soccer Federation) UCLA Bruins
13	MF	Olivia Moultrie	17 September 2005 (aged 16)	7	2	(United States Soccer Federation) Portland Thorns
14	MF	Carina Lageyre	1 November 2003 (aged 18)	4	0	(United States Soccer Federation) Duke Blue Devils
15	FW	Trinity Byars	29 January 2003 (aged 19)	9	3	(United States Soccer Federation) Texas Longhorns
16	DF	Lauren Flynn	22 May 2002 (aged 20)	8	0	(United States Soccer Federation) Florida State Seminoles
17	MF	Annie Karich	26 October 2003 (aged 18)			(United States Soccer Federation) Santa Clara Broncos
18	DF	Samar Guidry	18 January 2002 (aged 20)	10	0	(United States Soccer Federation) Virginia Cavaliers
19	MF	Korbin Albert	13 October 2003 (aged 18)	4	1	(United States Soccer Federation) Notre Dame Fighting Irish
20	FW	Ally Sentnor	18 February 2004 (aged 18)	2	0	(United States Soccer Federation) North Carolina Tar Heels
21	GK	Teagan Wy	30 July 2004 (aged 18)	2	0	(United States Soccer Federation) California Golden Bears
