= 2017 Copa MX Femenil =

Tournament details
- Host country: Mexico
- City: Toluca
- Dates: 3–6 May 2017
- Teams: 16

Final positions
- Champions: Pachuca (1st title)
- Runners-up: Tijuana

Tournament statistics
- Matches played: 19
- Goals scored: 83 (4.37 per match)
- Top scorer(s): Mónica Ocampo (8 goals)

The 2017 Copa MX Femenil was a women's association football tournament in Mexico. The tournament consists of 12 of the 16 Liga MX Femenil teams. The tournament was held between 3 May and 6 May at the Mexican Football Federation headquarters in Toluca, Mexico. The tournament was used by teams as a test to prepare for the Liga MX Femenil which launched in the second half of 2017.

Pachuca won the final 9–1 against Club Tijuana.

== Participants ==
The tournament was originally scheduled to feature all 16 of the Liga MX Femenil teams. It was later announced by Liga MX CEO Enrique Bonilla that only 12 teams would participate because four teams were not ready. (Atlas, León, Querétaro, Veracruz)

== Format ==
- The tournament featured 12 teams divided into 3 groups
- The group stage results were reflected in the classification table
- The two best teams in the classification table advanced to the final
- Each match was 70 minutes long, divided into two halves of 35 minutes with a cooling break at the 25th and 60th minute

== Tiebreakers ==
If two or more clubs were equal on points on completion of the group matches, the following criteria were applied to determine the rankings:

1. superior goal difference;
2. higher number of goals scored;
3. scores of the group matches played among the clubs in question;
4. fair play ranking;
5. drawing of lots

== Group stage ==
=== Classification table ===
Pos	Team	Pld	W	D	L	GF	GA	GD	Pts	Qualification or relegation
1	Pachuca (A)	3	3	0	0	18	4	+14	9	Advance to Final
2	Tijuana (A)	3	3	0	0	6	0	+6	9	Advance to Final
3	América	3	2	1	0	11	1	+10	7	
4	Necaxa	3	2	0	1	3	2	+1	6	
5	Toluca	3	2	0	1	6	7	−1	6	
6	Tigres UANL	3	1	1	1	5	7	−2	4	
7	Santos Laguna	3	1	0	2	3	4	−1	3	
8	Pumas UNAM	3	1	0	2	7	10	−3	3	
9	Monterrey	3	1	0	2	7	12	−5	3	
10	Guadalajara	3	1	0	2	3	10	−7	3	
11	Morelia	3	0	0	3	4	10	−6	0	
12	Cruz Azul	3	0	0	3	0	7	−7	0	

Updated to match(es) played on 4 May 2017. Source: Liga MX Femenil
Rules for classification: 1) Points; 2) Goal difference; 3) Number of goals scored; 4) Head-to-head results between tied teams; 5) Drawing of lots
(A) Advance to a further round

=== Group 1 ===
Pos	Team	Pld	W	D	L	GF	GA	GD	Pts
1	Pachuca	3	3	0	0	18	4	+14	9
2	Toluca	3	2	0	1	6	7	−1	6
3	Guadalajara	3	1	0	2	3	10	−7	3
4	Morelia	3	0	0	3	4	9	−5	0

Source: Liga MX Femenil
Rules for classification: Tiebreakers
3 May 2017
10:00

Toluca	2–1	Morelia
Téllez 41'; López 44'	Report	Calderón 43'

FMF Cancha 2, Toluca
Referee: Karen Janett Díaz

3 May 2017
12:15

Pachuca	6–1	Guadalajara
Muñoz 2', 6', 27'; Ocampo 34'; Franco 46', 69'	Report	Viramontes 67'

FMF Cancha 2, Toluca
Referee: Mayte Chávez

4 May 2017
10:00

Morelia	2–6	Pachuca
Calderón 8'; Ayala 72' (pen.)	Report	Ocampo 3', 39'; Franco 5', 35'; Arellano 7', 9'

FMF Cancha 1, Toluca
Referee: Blanca Elizabeth de Lira

4 May 2017
12:15

Toluca	3–0	Guadalajara
Hernández 9'; Chávez 9'; González 30'	Report

FMF Cancha 1, Toluca
Referee: Sandra Elizabeth Ramírez

5 May 2017
10:00

Morelia	1–2	Guadalajara
Molina 66'	Report	Viramontes 7'; Bejarano 29'

FMF Cancha 3, Toluca
Referee: Enedilla Caudillo Gómez

5 May 2017
12:15

Pachuca	6–1	Toluca
Ocampo 8', 19', 41'; Muñoz 33'; Nieto 60'; Arellano 65'	Report	López 40'

FMF Cancha 3, Toluca
Referee: Francia María González Martínez

=== Group 2 ===
Pos	Team	Pld	W	D	L	GF	GA	GD	Pts
1	América	3	2	1	0	11	1	+10	7
2	Tigres UANL	3	1	1	1	5	7	−2	4
3	Pumas UNAM	3	1	0	2	7	10	−3	3
4	Monterrey	3	1	0	2	7	12	−5	3

Source: Liga MX Femenil
Rules for classification: Tiebreakers
3 May 2017
10:00

Monterrey	0–6	América
	Report	Espinoza 19'; L. Cuevas 23'; Cázares 29', 41'; C. Cuevas 50', 67'

FMF Cancha 3, Toluca
Referee: Enedina Caudillo

3 May 2017
12:15

Pumas UNAM	4–1	Tigres UANL
Abud 6', 21', 33'; Jardón 23'	Report	Cruz 56'

FMF Cancha 3, Toluca
Referee: Blanca de Lira

4 May 2017
10:00

América	5–1	Pumas UNAM
Cázares 2', 44'; Espinoza 5'; Santamaría 51'; C. Cuevas 69'	Report	Abud 16'

FMF Cancha 2, Toluca
Referee: Mayra Mora

3 May 2017
12:15

Monterrey	3–4	Tigres UANL
Martínez 3'; Evangelista 36', 45'	Report	Silva 1', 34'; De La Cruz 14' (o.g.); Solís 19'

FMF Cancha 2, Toluca
Referee: Francia González

5 May 2017
10:00

América	0–0	Tigres UANL
	Report

FMF Cancha 1, Toluca
Referee: Karen Janett Díaz Medina

5 May 2017
12:15

Pumas UNAM	2–4	Monterrey
López 9'; Gómez 25'	Report	Evangelista 24', 45'; Verdirame 56', 64'

FMF Cancha 1, Toluca
Referee: Diana Stephanía Pérez Borja

=== Group 3 ===
Pos	Team	Pld	W	D	L	GF	GA	GD	Pts
1	Tijuana	3	3	0	0	6	0	+6	9
2	Necaxa	3	2	0	1	3	2	+1	6
3	Santos Laguna	3	1	0	2	3	4	−1	3
4	Cruz Azul	3	0	0	3	0	6	−6	0

Source: Liga MX Femenil
Rules for classification: Tiebreakers
3 May 2017
10:00

Tijuana	2–0	Cruz Azul
Ibarra 25'; Jaramillo 41'	Report

FMF Cancha 1, Toluca
Referee: Francia María González Martínez

3 May 2017
12:15

Santos Laguna	0–2	Necaxa
	Report	García 4'; Pérez 38'

FMF Cancha 1, Toluca
Referee: Mayra Alejandra Mora Cerero

4 May 2017
10:00

Cruz Azul	0–3	Santos Laguna
	Report	Adriano 11'; Gutiérrez 35' (o.g.); Polina 49'

FMF Cancha 3, Toluca
Referee: Priscila Eritzel Pérez Borja

4 May 2017
12:15

Necaxa	0–2	Tijuana
	Report	Jaramillo 30', 54'

FMF Cancha 3, Toluca
Referee: Diana Stephania Pérez Borja

5 May 2017
10:00

Cruz Azul	0–1	Necaxa
	Report	Sánchez 24'

FMF Cancha 2, Toluca
Referee: Mayte Chávez

4 May 2017
12:15

Santos Laguna	0–2	Tijuana
	Report	Ibarra 7', 25'

FMF Cancha 2, Toluca
Referee: Ana Cristina Alfaro

== Final ==
6 May 2017
12:05

Pachuca	9–1	Tijuana
Muñoz 20', 22', 50'; Franco 6', 43'; D. García 17'; Ocampo 36', 41'; Ángeles 65'	Report	Hernández 34'

Estadio FMF, Toluca
Referee: Quetzalli Alvarado

== Top goalscorers ==
Players sorted first by goals scored, then by last name

Rank	Player	Club	Goals
1	(Mexico) Mónica Ocampo	Pachuca	8
2	(Mexico) Berenice Muñoz	Pachuca	7
3	(Mexico) Yamile Franco	Pachuca	6
4	(Mexico) Karime Abud	Pumas UNAM	4
4	(Mexico) Dayana Cázares	América	4
4	(Mexico) Diana Evangelista	Monterrey	4
7	(Mexico) Fátima Arellano	Pachuca	3
7	(Mexico) Casandra Cuevas	América	3
7	(Mexico) Fabiola Ibarra	Tijuana	3
7	(Mexico) Carolina Jaramillo	Tijuana	3

Source: Liga MX Femenil
