= Descanso =

Descanso may refer to:

- Descanso (roadside memorial)
- Descanso (spider), a genus of jumping spider
- Descanso, California, an unincorporated community in the United States
- Descanso, Santa Catarina, a town and municipality in Brazil
- Descanso Gardens, a botanical garden in La Cañada Flintridge, California
