= Clásico Regiomontano (women's football) =

Mexican women's football derby

Clásico Regiomontano Femenil
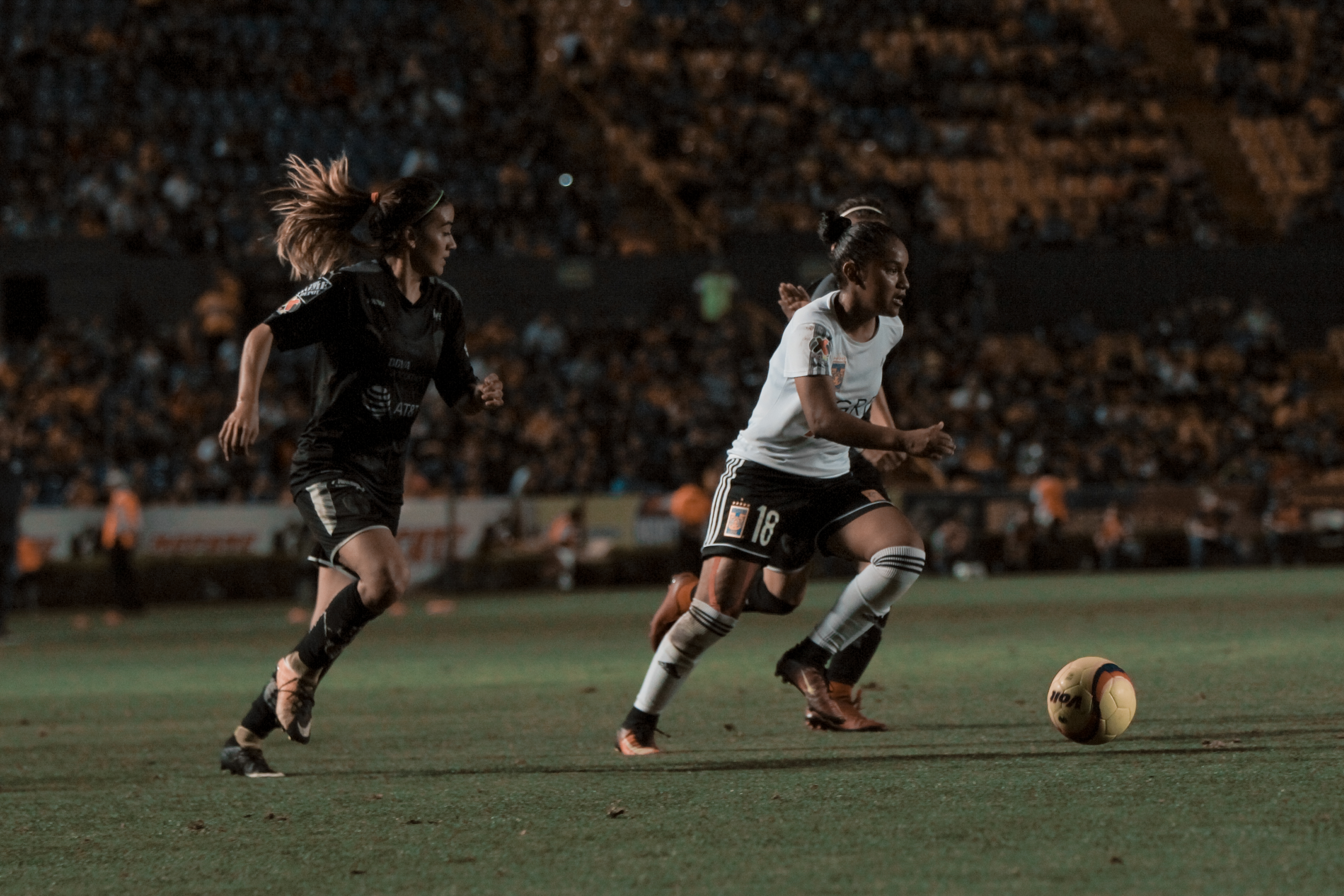
- Native name: Clásico Regiomontano Femenil (Spanish)
- Location: Mexico
- Teams: Club de Fútbol Monterrey; Tigres UANL
- First meeting: 4 May 2017; Copa MX Femenil; Monterrey 3–4 UANL
- Latest meeting: 28 April 2025; Torneo Clausura; Monterrey 1–1 UANL
- Stadiums: BBVA (Monterrey); Universitario (UANL)

Statistics
- Total meetings: 39 (official)
- Most wins: UANL (13)
- All-time series: UANL: 13; Monterrey: 7 Draws: 19
- Largest victory: Monterrey 1–5 UANL; Torneo Clausura (14 February 2025)

Clásico Regiomontano Femenil is the match between the women's teams of Club de Fútbol Monterrey and Tigres UANL of the Liga MX Femenil. Both teams, like their men's counterparts, represent the state of Nuevo León.

Both Tigres and Monterrey are the most successful teams in the Liga MX Femenil, with six and four titles, respectively; they are also the only clubs to have won the championship twice. Both have also played against each other in the Liga MX final on six occasions, and at least one of the two has appeared in twelve of the 16 finals in the tournament's history.

== History ==
The first women's Clásico Regio took place on May 4, 2017, during the second round of the Copa MX Femenil. The victory went to Las Amazonas, who defeated their rivals 4-3; Lanny Silva scored the first goal in the Clásico's nascent history just as the match had begun.

== Team summaries ==
=== Major competitions ===
Competition	Matches	Wins		Draws	Goals	
Competition	Matches	MTY	UANL	Draws	MTY	UANL
Liga MX Femenil	35	7	10	18	44	50
Copa MX Femenil	1	0	1	0	3	4
Campeón de Campeonas	2	0	1	1	2	3
CONCACAF W Champions Cup	1	0	1	0	0	4
Total matches	39	7	13	19	50	61

== See also ==
- Women's football in Mexico
- Clásico Regiomontano (men's)
