= Mónica Ocampo =

Mexican footballer (born 1987)

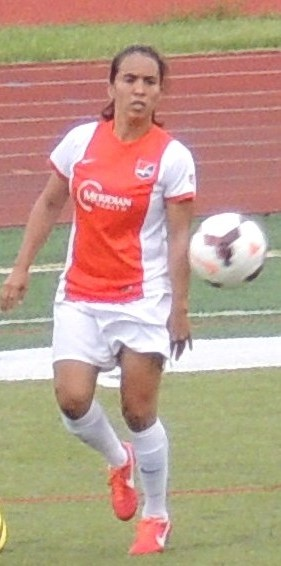
- Ocampo with Sky Blue FC in 2014

Personal information
- Full name: Mónica Ocampo Medina
- Date of birth: 4 January 1987 (age 39)
- Place of birth: Jojutla, Morelos, Mexico
- Height: 1.56 m (5 ft 1 in)
- Position: Attacking midfielder

Senior career*
Years	Team	Apps	(Gls)
2006–2009	Indiana	48	(27)
2010	Atlanta Beat	17	(3)
2013–2015	Sky Blue	35	(11)
2017–2025	Pachuca	96	(46)

International career^{‡}
2004	Mexico U19		
2005–2006	Mexico U-20		
2006–2018	Mexico	77	(14)
- * Club domestic league appearances and goals as of 20 November 2017 ‡ National team caps and goals as of 18 June 2015

Mónica Ocampo Medina (born 4 January 1987) is a former Mexican professional footballer who last played as a forward for CF Pachuca and the Mexico women's national team. She has also been a member of Mexico's U19 and U-20 teams.

== Club career ==
=== Indiana and Atlanta Beat ===
From 2006 to 2009, Ocampo played with W-League club FC Indiana.

In 2010, she signed with Atlanta Beat in the WPS. She made 17 appearances for the club and scored three goals.

=== Sky Blue ===
On 11 January 2013 she joined Sky Blue FC in the new National Women's Soccer League (NWSL). On 26 June 2013, Ocampo scored goals in the 85th and 92nd minute to lead Sky Blue to a 2–2 tie with FC Kansas City. On 10 August, Ocampo scored two goals in a 3–3 tie between Sky Blue and the Chicago Red Stars.

Ocampo was voted player of the week in the NWSL on 19 June 2013 and player of the month for August 2013. Although she only started nine out of the 22 matches that Sky Blue played in the regular season, she scored a higher percentage of goals per minute of playing time than any other player in the league. She was awarded the Golden Boot as Sky Blue's most prolific scorer.

=== Pachuca ===
In 2017, Ocampo began playing for Pachuca in the Liga MX Femenil. She competed in the Copa MX Femenil where her team went undefeated in the and emerged as the champions by defeating Tijuana in the final with a 9–1 score, with Ocampo herself scoring two goals. Pachuca thus became the first women's football team in Mexico to win an official tournament. She also won the league title in the Clausura 2025 season.

Ocampo retired from playing after the Apertura 2025 season.

== International career ==
Ocampo represented Mexico at the 2004 CONCACAF U-19 Women's Qualifying Tournament. At senior level, she scored a long–range equalizer against England in Mexico's first group match of the 2011 FIFA Women's World Cup. In 2019, that goal was voted by FIFA the best goal all-time in the Women's World Cup.

== International goals ==
No.	Date	Venue	Opponent	Score	Result	Competition
1.	25 May 2006	Melbourne Cricket Ground, Melbourne, Australia	Australia	1–0	1–2	Friendly
2.	13 September 2006	PAETEC Park, Rochester, United States	United States	1–1	1–3	Friendly
3.	26 November 2006	The Home Depot Center, Carson, United States	Jamaica	1–0	3–0	2006 CONCACAF Women's Gold Cup
4.	26 November 2006	The Home Depot Center, Carson, United States	Jamaica	3–0	3–0	2006 CONCACAF Women's Gold Cup
5.	14 July 2007	Estádio Olímpico João Havelange, Rio de Janeiro, Brazil	Paraguay	2–0	5–0	2007 Pan American Games
6.	14 July 2007	Estádio Olímpico João Havelange, Rio de Janeiro, Brazil	Paraguay	4–0	5–0	2007 Pan American Games
7.	20 October 2007	University Stadium, Albuquerque, United States	United States	1–0	1–1	Friendly
8.	2 April 2008	Estadio Olímpico Benito Juárez, Ciudad Juárez, Mexico	Jamaica	8–1	8–1	2008 CONCACAF Women's Olympic Qualifying Tournament
9.	13 December 2009	Estádio do Pacaembu, São Paulo, Brazil	Brazil	1–2	3–2	2009 Torneio Internacional
10.	20 June 2011	Jahnstadion, Göttingen, Germany	Australia	1–0	2–3	Friendly
11.	27 June 2011	Volkswagen Arena, Wolfsburg, Germany	England	1–1	1–1	2011 FIFA Women's World Cup
12.	18 October 2014	Toyota Park, Bridgeview, United States	Martinique	8–0	10–0	2014 CONCACAF Women's Championship
13.	18 October 2014	Toyota Park, Bridgeview, United States	Martinique	9–0	10–0	2014 CONCACAF Women's Championship
14.	26 October 2014	PPL Park, Chester, United States	Trinidad and Tobago	2–2	2–4 (a.e.t.)	2014 CONCACAF Women's Championship
15.	18 July 2015	Hamilton Pan Am Soccer Stadium, Hamilton, Canada	Trinidad and Tobago	3–1	3–1	2015 Pan American Games
16.	16 December 2015	Arena das Dunas, Natal, Brazil	Trinidad and Tobago	2–0	3–0	2015 Torneio Internacional
17.	8 April 2018	BBVA Stadium, Houston, United States	United States	1–1	2–6	Friendly
18.	20 July 2018	Estadio Moderno Julio Torres, Barranquilla, Colombia	Trinidad and Tobago	1–0	5–1	2018 Central American and Caribbean Games
19.	20 July 2018	Estadio Moderno Julio Torres, Barranquilla, Colombia	Trinidad and Tobago	2–0	5–1	2018 Central American and Caribbean Games
20.	27 July 2018	Estadio Moderno Julio Torres, Barranquilla, Colombia	Venezuela	1–0	3–1	2018 Central American and Caribbean Games

== Personal life ==
Ocampo has two children.

== Honours and achievements ==
Pachuca

- Liga MX Femenil: Clausura 2025
- Copa MX Femenil: 2017
- Campeón de Campeonas: 2025

Individual

- Liga MX Femenil Team of The Season: Apertura 2017

== See also ==
- List of Mexican Fútbol (soccer) athletes
- List of people from Morelos
