= Brenda García =

Mexican footballer (born 1996)

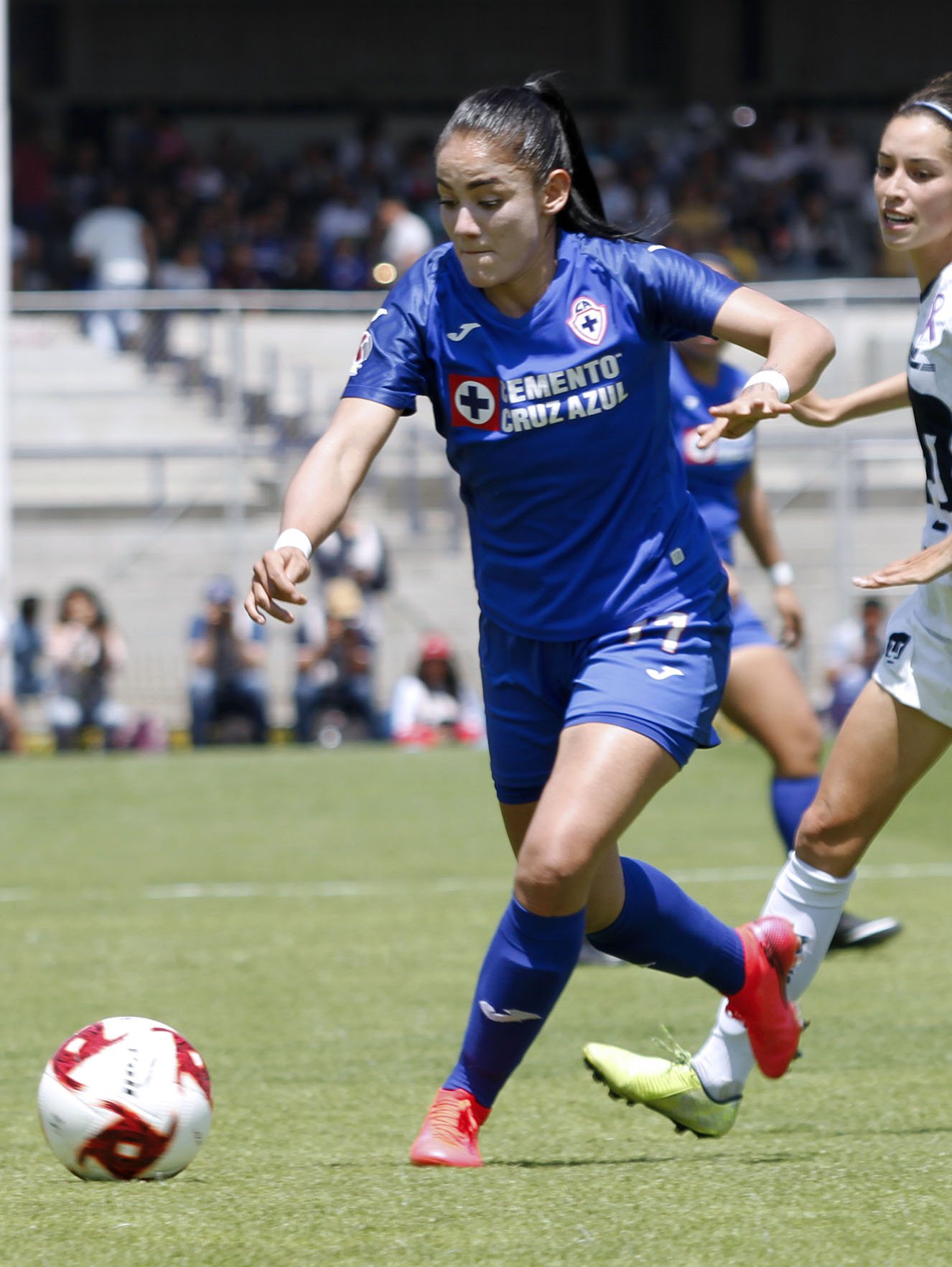
- García in 2020

Personal information
- Full name: Brenda Judith García Valadez
- Date of birth: 12 February 1996 (age 30)
- Place of birth: Aguascalientes City, Mexico
- Height: 1.61 m (5 ft 3 1/2 in)
- Position: Right-back

Senior career*
Years	Team	Apps	(Gls)
2017–2019	Necaxa	35	(2)
2019–2020	Cruz Azul	39	(0)
2021–2022	Atlético San Luis	41	(0)
2022	Tijuana	2	(0)
2023	Puebla	27	(3)
2024–2025	Mazatlán	46	(2)
- * Club domestic league appearances and goals as of March 2024

Brenda Judith García Valadez (born 12 February 1996) is a Mexican footballer who plays as a defender. She most recently played for Liga MX Femenil club Mazatlán.

== Club career ==
Brenda García was born on 12 February 1996 in Aguascalientes City.

She made her professional debut for Necaxa on 3 May 2017 in a game against Santos Laguna, where she scored Necaxa's first goal ever four minutes into the match. García scored her second goal with Necaxa in the Apertura 2017 tournament in a 1–1 draw with Atlas.

For the 2019–20 season, García was transferred to Cruz Azul, where she has become a fundamental player for the team.

On 10 April 2025, the Mexican Football Federation (FMF) launched an investigation for match fixing involving Mazatlán players in which García took part. On 30 April, she was banned by the FMF for six years for match fixing and released by Mazatlán on 9 May.

== Career statistics ==
=== Club ===
As of match played 14 March 2020

Appearances and goals by club, season and competition
Club	Season	League			Total	
Club	Season	Division	Apps	Goals	Apps	Goals
Necaxa	2017	Liga MX Femenil	3	1	3	1
Necaxa	2017–18	Liga MX Femenil	12	1	12	1
Necaxa	2018–19	Liga MX Femenil	20	0	20	0
Necaxa	Total		35	2	35	2
Cruz Azul	2019–20	Liga MX Femenil	28	0	28	0
Cruz Azul	Total		28	0	28	0
Career total			63	2	63	2
