= Samantha Simental =

Mexican footballer (born 2002)

Personal information
- Full name: Samantha Abigail Simental Leyva
- Date of birth: 15 August 2002 (age 24)
- Place of birth: Durango City, Durango, Mexico
- Height: 1.58 m (5 ft 2 in)
- Position: Left back

Team information
- Current team: Monterrey
- Number: 15

Senior career*
Years	Team	Apps	(Gls)
2019–	Monterrey	104	(1)
- * Club domestic league appearances and goals as of 4 June 2023

Samantha Abigail Simental Leyva (born 15 August 2002) is a Mexican professional footballer who plays as a Left back for Liga MX Femenil side Monterrey.

== Club career ==
In 2019, she started her career in Monterrey.
