= Emily Burns (soccer) =

Canadian soccer player (born 1997)

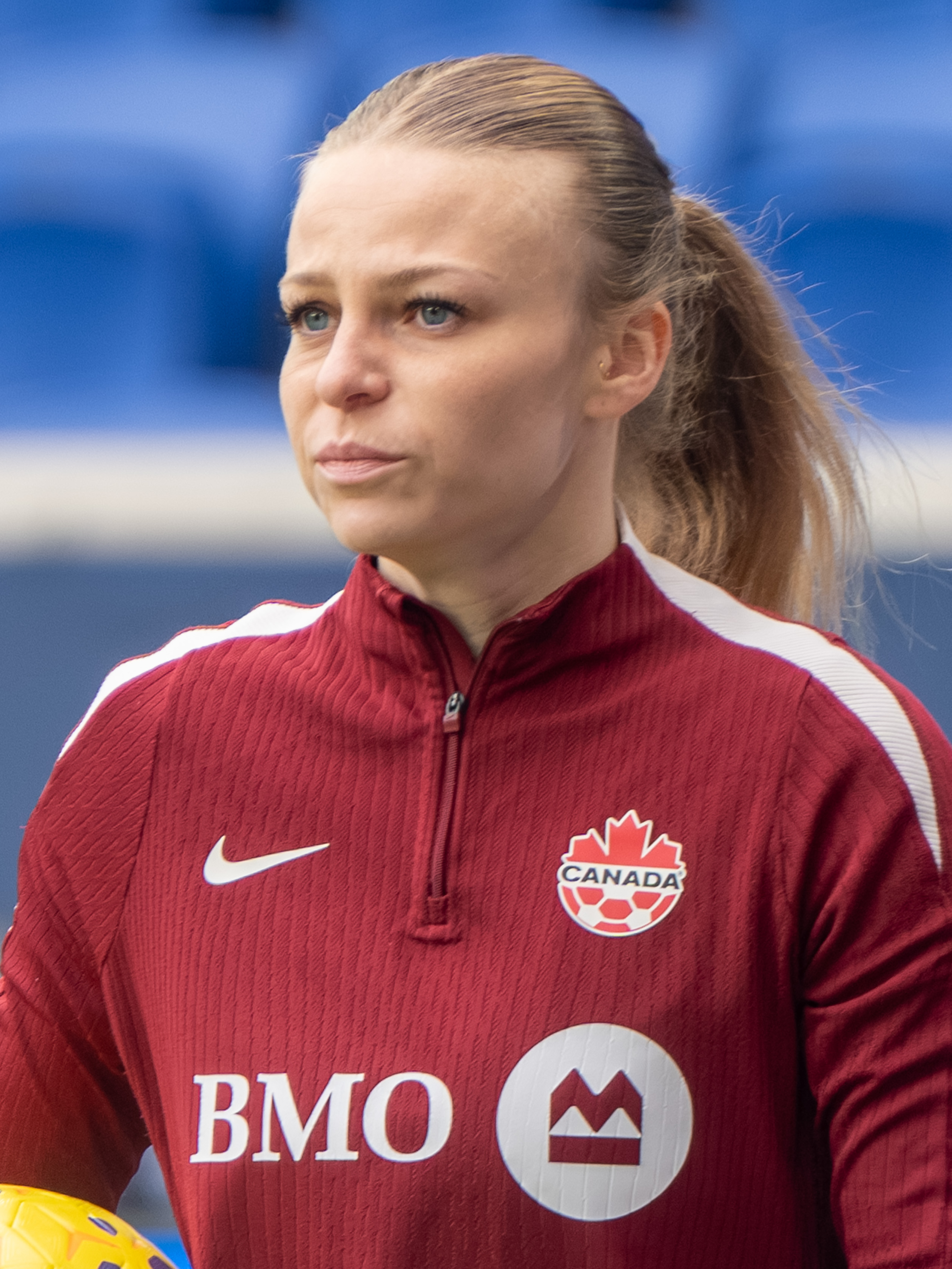
- Burns with Canada in 2026

Personal information
- Full name: Emily Raechel Burns
- Date of birth: July 24, 1997 (age 29)
- Place of birth: Edmonton, Alberta, Canada
- Height: 5 ft 9 in (1.75 m)
- Position: Goalkeeper

Team information
- Current team: Les Marseillaises
- Number: 1

College career
Years	Team	Apps	(Gls)
2015–2019	MacEwan Griffins	64	(0)

Senior career*
Years	Team	Apps	(Gls)
2017–2019	Calgary Foothills WFC	16	(0)
2020–2021	Racing Santander	20	(0)
2021–2022	Saint-Étienne	10	(0)
2022–2023	Dijon	1	(0)
2023–2026	Nantes	60	(0)
2026–	Marseille	0	(0)

International career
2016–2018	Canada (University) (futsal)		
- * Club domestic league appearances and goals as of March 10, 2026

Emily Raechel Burns (born July 24, 1997) is a Canadian professional soccer player who plays as a goalkeeper for Première Ligue club Marseille.

== Early life ==
Born in Edmonton, Burns grew up in nearby Sherwood Park, Alberta. She attended Strathcona Christian Academy, where she played soccer, volleyball, and basketball. She then attended MacEwan University, where she played for the Griffins soccer team. She was named a U Sports second-team all-star in 2019.

== Club career ==
During college, Burns also played for Calgary Foothills WFC in United Women's Soccer. At one point, she was joined in the goalkeeping pool by Canada starter Stephanie Labbé, who had been denied to play for Calgary's men's team. In 2020, she signed her first professional contract with Racing Santander in Spain's Segunda División Pro.

After one season, Burns moved to France with Division 1 Féminine club Saint-Étienne. She made her debut with Les Vertes at the first opportunity on August 28, 2021, starting in a 1–1 draw with Bordeaux on the opening matchday. During the season, she appeared in 10 of the 22 league games, alternating as the starter with Maryne Gignoux-Soulier, but without managing to avoid relegation.

In the summer of 2022, Burns joined fellow league club Dijon, but with Lisa Lichtfus as the first-choice keeper, she made only three appearances during the entire season, one in the league and two in the Coupe de France Féminine. She then moved to Nantes, playing in the Division 2 Féminine. She made her debut in a 5–3 win over Albi on the opening matchday on September 17, 2023. She went on to play every minute of the league season, contributing to Nantes' first promotion to the Première Ligue, thanks to a second-place finish. Having kept 10 clean sheets in 22 league games, she won the award for Best Goalkeeper in Division 2.

The following season, Burns was one of thirteen players retained in the squad for the first season in the top flight. She kept a clean sheet in Nantes' league debut, a 1–0 win over Le Havre on the opening matchday on September 21, 2024. She went on to spend three total seasons at Nantes before departing from the club in June 2026.

On 15 July 2026, Burns was announced to have joined Les Marseillaises.

== International career ==
Burns represented Canada at the World University Futsal Championships in 2016 and 2018.

In October 2025, Canada head coach Casey Stoney gave Burns her first call-up to the national team.

== Honors and awards ==
Individual

- Division 2 Féminine Best Goalkeeper: 2023–24
