= Leonardo Álvarez =

Mexican footballer and manager (born 1978)

Personal information
- Full name: Leonardo Álvarez Alanís
- Date of birth: 24 September 1978 (age 48)
- Place of birth: Monterrey, Nuevo León, Mexico
- Height: 1.81 m (5 ft 11 1/2 in)
- Position: Defender

Team information
- Current team: Monterrey U-19 (women) (Manager)

Senior career*
| Years | Team | Apps | (Gls) |
| 2003 | Alacranes de Durango | 5 | (0) |
| 2004 | Jaguares de Tapachula | 1 | (0) |

Managerial career
- 2018–2019: Necaxa Reserves and Academy
- 2020–2021: Necaxa (women) (Assistant)
- 2021: Necaxa (women) (Interim)
- 2021–2022: Querétaro Reserves and Academy
- 2022: Querétaro (women) (Assistant)
- 2023: Querétaro (women)
- 2023–2026: Monterrey Reserves and Academy
- 2025: Monterrey (women) (Interim)
- 2026–: Monterrey U-19 (women)
- * Club domestic league appearances and goals

Leonardo Álvarez Alanís (born 24 September 1978) is a Mexican football manager and former player who is currently the manager of Liga MX Femenil club Monterrey.
