= Carmen López =

Mexican footballer (born 2005)

Carmen Lopez
Personal information
- Full name: Carmen Sarahi Lopez Manzano
- Date of birth: 17 March 2005 (age 21)
- Place of birth: Dallas, Texas, United States
- Height: 1.73 m (5 ft 8 in)
- Position: Goalkeeper

Team information
- Current team: Pachuca
- Number: 22

College career
Years	Team	Apps	(Gls)
2023	Dallas Baptist Patriots	16	(0)

Senior career*
Years	Team	Apps	(Gls)
2024–	Pachuca	2	(0)

International career^{‡}
2023–	Mexico U-20		
- * Club domestic league appearances and goals as of 4 June 2023 ‡ National team caps and goals as of 12 March 2022

Carmen Sarahi Lopez Manzano (born 17 March 2005) is an American-born Mexican professional footballer who plays as a goalkeeper for Liga MX Femenil side Pachuca.

== Career ==
In 2024, she started her career in Pachuca.

== International career ==
Since 2023, Lopez has been part of the Mexico U-20 team.
