= Sofía Martínez =

Mexican footballer (born 2004)

Personal information
- Full name: Lourdes Sofía Martínez Barajas
- Date of birth: 19 July 2004 (age 22)
- Place of birth: Culiacán, Sinaloa, Mexico
- Height: 1.67 m (5 ft 6 in)
- Position: Winger

Team information
- Current team: Monterrey
- Number: 6

Senior career*
Years	Team	Apps	(Gls)
2020–2023	Pachuca	47	(2)
2023	Real Oviedo		
2024–	Monterrey	6	(1)
2025	→ Puebla (loan)	6	(0)

International career
2019	Mexico U-17		
- * Club domestic league appearances and goals as of 4 June 2023

Lourdes Sofía Martínez Barajas (born 19 July 2004) is a Mexican professional footballer who plays as a Winger for Liga MX Femenil side Monterrey.

== Club career ==
In 2021, she started her career in Pachuca. In 2023, she was transferred to Real Oviedo. In 2024, she signed with Monterrey. Since 2025, she is part of Puebla.
