= Aline Gomes =

Brazilian footballer (born 2005)

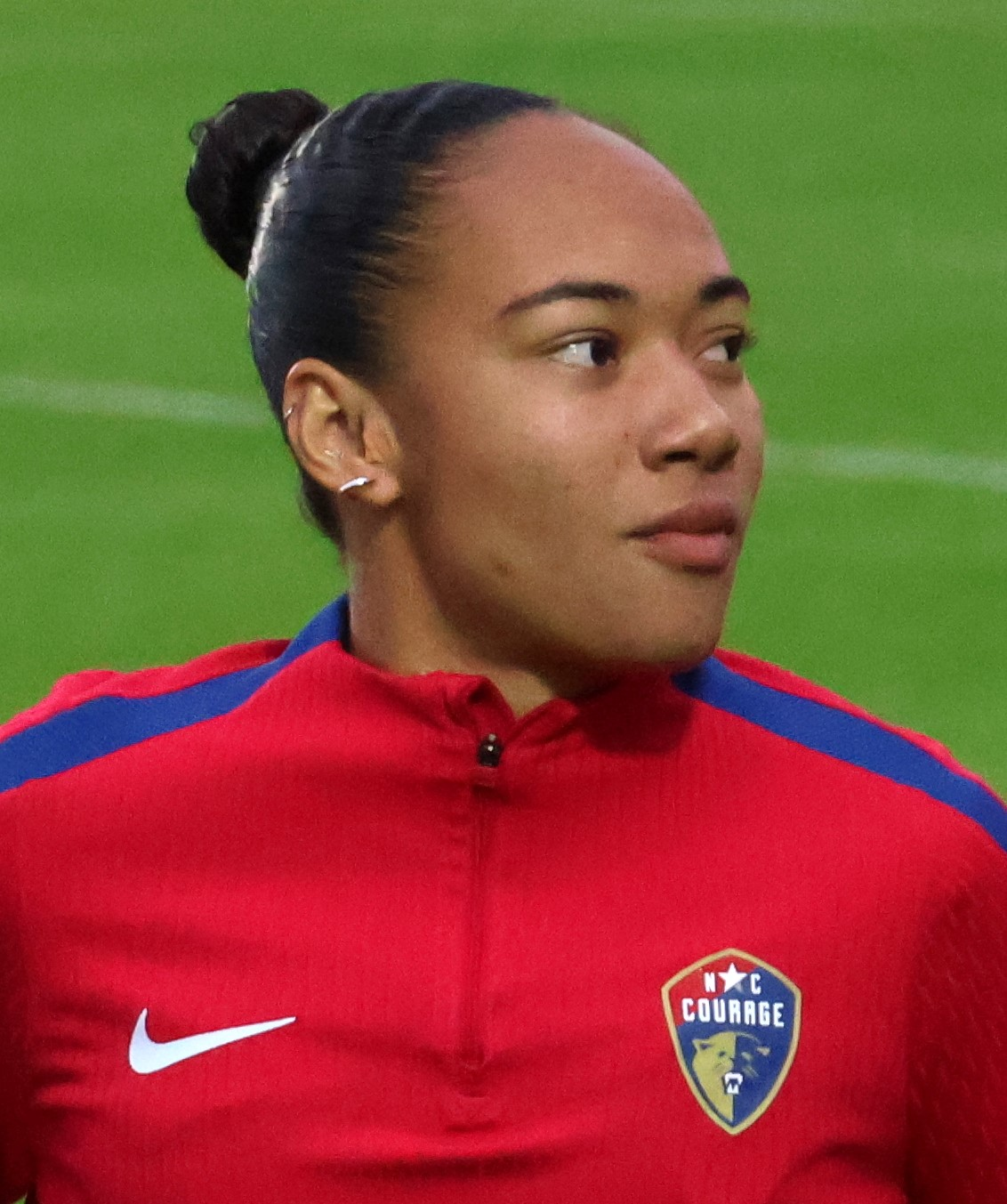
- Aline Gomes with the North Carolina Courage in 2025

Personal information
- Full name: Aline Gomes Amaro
- Date of birth: 7 July 2005 (age 21)
- Place of birth: Tabatinga, Brazil
- Height: 1.67 m (5 ft 6 in)
- Position: Forward

Team information
- Current team: Pachuca
- Number: 25

Youth career
- 2020–2022: Ferroviária

Senior career*
Years	Team	Apps	(Gls)
2021–2024	Ferroviária	42	(12)
2024–2025	North Carolina Courage	21	(2)
2026–	Pachuca	0	(0)

International career^{‡}
2022	Brazil U17	4	(2)
2022–	Brazil U20	6	(2)
2023–	Brazil	4	(0)
- * Club domestic league appearances and goals as of November 1, 2025 ‡ National team caps and goals as of 13:55, 1 August 2024 (UTC)

Aline Gomes Amaro (born 7 July 2005), known as Aline Gomes or just Aline, is a Brazilian professional footballer who plays as a forward for Liga MX Femenil club Pachuca and the Brazil national team.

== Club career ==
=== Ferroviária ===
Born in Tabatinga, São Paulo, Aline Gomes joined Ferroviária's youth setup in 2020, aged 15. She made her first team debut on 24 June 2021, coming on as a second-half substitute for Aline Milene in a 2–1 Campeonato Brasileiro Série A1 home win over Flamengo.

Aline Gomes scored her first senior goal on 15 August 2021, netting the winner in a 3–2 home success over Santos; at the age of 16 years, one month and eight days, she became the youngest player to score for AFE in the competition. She subsequently started to feature more regularly in the 2022 season, being named the Breakthrough Player of the year's Brasileirão.

=== North Carolina Courage ===
On 30 July 2024, it was announced that Aline Gomes was acquired by National Women's Soccer League (NWSL) club North Carolina Courage for a rumoured fee of around R$ 1 million, signing a two-and-a-half year contract. She debuted two days later against the Kansas City Current as an 80th-minute substitute for Haley Hopkins. On 5 October, she scored her first NWSL goal to open the scoring in a playoff-clinching 2–1 win over the San Diego Wave. She scored 2 goals in 21 regular-season games over one-and-a-half seasons with the Courage.

=== Pachuca ===
In January 2026, Aline Gomes joined Liga MX Femenil club Pachuca for an undisclosed fee.

== International career ==
After representing Brazil at under-17 and under-20 levels, Aline Gomes received her first call up to the full side by manager Pia Sundhage on 20 March 2023, for the 2023 Women's Finalissima against England.

Aline Gomes was crowned champion of the CONMEBOL Women's Under-19 Evolution League 2023 on Sunday, September 24, by defeating the Paraguayan national team 2-0, and she scored the second goal that sealed the match's result.

Gomes was called up for the 2026 FIFA Series hosted in Brazil, where she scored in a 1–0 win against Canada in the final, as Brazil won the tournament on 18 April 2026.

=== International goals ===
No.	Date	Venue	Opponent	Score	Result	Competition
1.	18 April 2026	Arena Pantanal, Cuiabá, Brazil	Canada	1–0	1–0	2026 FIFA Series
