= Amanda Coimbra =

Brazilian footballer

Personal information
- Full name: Amanda Coimbra Peres
- Date of birth: 15 June 2002 (age 24)
- Place of birth: Limeira, Brazil
- Height: 1.76 m (5 ft 9 in)
- Position: Goalkeeper

Team information
- Current team: Fluminense
- Number: 12

Youth career
- 2017: Corinthians
- 2018: Inter de Limeira
- 2019–2022: Atlético Mineiro

Senior career*
| Years | Team | Apps | (Gls) |
| 2020–2022 | Atlético Mineiro | 1 | (0) |
| 2023– | Fluminense | 13 | (0) |

International career^{‡}
| 2022 | Brazil U20 | 1 | (0) |
- * Club domestic league appearances and goals as of 16:18, 14 February 2024 (UTC) ‡ National team caps and goals as of 16:18, 14 February 2024 (UTC)

Amanda Coimbra Peres (born 15 June 2002), known as Amanda Coimbra, is a Brazilian professional footballer who plays as a goalkeeper for Fluminense.

== Club career ==
Born in Limeira, São Paulo, Amanda Coimbra represented the youth sides of Corinthians and Inter de Limeira before joining Atlético Mineiro's youth setup in 2019. On 28 September 2020, she was promoted to the latter's first team.

Amanda Coimbra was mainly a backup option during her spell at Galo, and moved to Fluminense on 22 January 2023. On 28 November, after being a first-choice and helping in the club's promotion to the Campeonato Brasileiro Série A1, she renewed her contract with the club for a further season.

== International career ==
Amanda Coimbra represented Brazil at under-20 level in the 2022 FIFA U-20 Women's World Cup, but was mainly a backup to Gabi Barbieri. On 1 February 2024, she was called up to the full side by head coach Arthur Elias for the 2024 CONCACAF W Gold Cup; she became the first player of the club to appear with the national side.

== Honours ==
Atlético Mineiro

- Campeonato Mineiro de Futebol Feminino: 2020, 2021, 2022
