= Jocelyn Orejel =

Mexican footballer (born 1996)

Personal information
- Full name: Jocelyn Marie Orejel Tavares
- Date of birth: 14 November 1996 (age 29)
- Place of birth: Fountain Valley, California, U.S.
- Height: 1.83 m (6 ft 0 in)
- Positions: Centre-back; defensive midfielder

Team information
- Current team: Pachuca
- Number: 7

College career
Years	Team	Apps	(Gls)
2014–2017	Colorado Buffaloes	69	(2)

Senior career*
Years	Team	Apps	(Gls)
2018	LA Galaxy OC	0	(0)
2018–2019	CSFA Ambilly	19	(0)
2019–2020	Tijuana	19	(2)
2020–2025	América	163	(8)
2025–	Pachuca		

International career^{‡}
2012	Mexico U17	3	(0)
2015	Mexico U20		
2018–	Mexico	22	(0)
- * Club domestic league appearances and goals as of 30 May 2024 ‡ National team caps and goals as of 10 April 2021

Jocelyn Marie "Joss" Orejel Tavares (born 14 November 1996) is a professional footballer who plays as defender or midfielder for Liga MX Femenil side Pachuca. Born in the United States, she represents Mexico at the international level.

== International career ==
Orejel represented Mexico at the 2012 FIFA U-17 Women's World Cup. She made her senior debut on 20 July 2018 in a friendly match against Trinidad and Tobago.

== Honours ==
Club América

- Liga MX Femenil: Clausura 2023
