= Blanky Serrano =

Mexican footballer (born 2004)

Personal information
- Full name: Blanky Denisse Serrano Mendiola
- Date of birth: 29 October 2004 (age 22)
- Place of birth: Uruapan, Michoacán, Mexico
- Height: 1.61 m (5 ft 3 in)
- Position: Attacking midfielder

Senior career*
Years	Team	Apps	(Gls)
2019–2024	Pachuca	48	(8)

International career^{‡}
2022	Mexico U-20		
- * Club domestic league appearances and goals as of March 2024 ‡ National team caps and goals as of 14 July 2023

Blanky Denisse Serrano Mendiola (born 29 October 2004) is a Mexican professional footballer who plays as an attacking midfielder for Liga MX Femenil side Pachuca.

== Career ==
Serrano started her career in 2019 with Pachuca.

== International career ==
Serrano was also part of the team that participated in the 2022 FIFA U-20 Women's World Cup in Costa Rica.
