= Berenice Muñoz =

Mexican footballer (born 2000)

Personal information
- Full name: Berenice Muñoz Gerardo
- Date of birth: 11 March 2000 (age 26)
- Place of birth: Tulancingo, Hidalgo, Mexico
- Height: 1.66 m (5 ft 5 1/2 in)
- Positions: Winger; forward

Senior career*
Years	Team	Apps	(Gls)
2017–2021	Pachuca	40	(16)
2021	León	9	(0)
2022	Querétaro	8	(0)

International career
2018	Mexico U20		
- * Club domestic league appearances and goals as of 20 November 2017

Berenice Muñoz Gerardo (born 11 March 2000), is a Mexican football striker.
