= Paola Manrique =

Mexican footballer (born 2002)

Personal information
- Full name: Paola Naomi Manrique Mendoza
- Date of birth: 28 April 2002 (age 24)
- Place of birth: Cuernavaca, Morelos, Mexico
- Height: 1.71 m (5 ft 7 in)
- Position: Goalkeeper

Team information
- Current team: Monterrey
- Number: 28

Senior career*
Years	Team	Apps	(Gls)
2018–2019	BUAP	14	(0)
2019–2023	Pachuca	15	(0)
2024	Puebla	3	(0)
2024–	Monterrey	17	(0)

International career^{‡}
2022	Mexico U-20		
- * Club domestic league appearances and goals as of 1 February 2026 ‡ National team caps and goals as of 14 July 2023

Paola Naomi Manrique Mendoza (born 28 April 2002) is a Mexican professional footballer who plays as a goalkeeper for Liga MX Femenil side Monterrey.

== Career ==
Manrique started her career in 2018 with BUAP. In 2019 she joined Pachuca. In 2024 she was transferred to Puebla. After one season she moved to Monterrey.

== International career ==
Manrique was also part of the team that participated in the 2022 FIFA U-20 Women's World Cup in Costa Rica.
