= Gabi Barbieri =

Brazilian footballer (born 2003)

Personal information
- Full name: Gabriela Kasper Barbieri
- Date of birth: 7 March 2003 (age 23)
- Place of birth: Descanso, Brazil
- Height: 1.68 m (5 ft 6 in)
- Position: Goalkeeper

Team information
- Current team: Internacional
- Number: 1

Youth career
- 2017–2019: Chapecoense
- 2020–2021: Internacional

Senior career*
Years	Team	Apps	(Gls)
2019	Chapecoense		
2021–2023	Internacional	23	(0)
2024–2025	Flamengo	0	(0)
2026–	Internacional		

International career^{‡}
2022	Brazil U20	11	(0)
- * Club domestic league appearances and goals as of 02:26, 13 November 2023 (UTC) ‡ National team caps and goals as of 21:26, 26 January 2023 (UTC)

Gabriela "Gabi" Kasper Barbieri (born 7 March 2003) is a Brazilian professional footballer who plays as a goalkeeper for Internacional.

== Club career ==
Barbieri was born in Descanso, Santa Catarina, and began her career with Chapecoense in 2017. In 2019, she moved to Internacional, being initially assigned to the under-18 team.

Promoted to the first team in 2021, Barbieri was initially a third-choice behind Vivi Holzel and Mayara, before becoming a backup option in the 2022 season. On 10 November 2022, she renewed with Inter for a further year.

On 2 January 2024, Barbieri was announced at Flamengo.

On 26 December 2025, Barbieri’s return to Internacional was announced.

== International career ==
Barbieri represented Brazil at under-20 level in the 2022 South American Under-20 Women's Football Championship and the 2022 FIFA U-20 Women's World Cup, winning the former. On 19 June of that year, prior to the U-20 World Cup, she was called up to the full side by manager Pia Sundhage for friendlies against Denmark and Sweden; she was an unused substitute in both matches.

== Honours ==
=== Club ===
Internacional

- Campeonato Gaúcho de Futebol Feminino: 2021

=== International ===
Brazil U20

- South American Under-20 Women's Football Championship: 2022
