= Karime Abud =

Mexican footballer (born 1993)

Personal information
- Full name: Karime Abud Lira
- Date of birth: 24 January 1993 (age 33)
- Place of birth: Álvaro Obregón, Mexico City, Mexico
- Height: 1.68 m (5 ft 6 in)
- Position: Winger

Team information
- Current team: Juárez
- Number: 20

Senior career*
Years	Team	Apps	(Gls)
2017–2018	UNAM	25	(16)
2019–2020	Toluca	24	(3)
2020–2023	Cruz Azul	92	(10)
2023–	Juárez	47	(3)
- * Club domestic league appearances and goals as of 4 June 2023 ‡ National team caps and goals as of 12 March 2022

Karime Abud Lira (born 1 June 1992) is a Mexican professional footballer who plays as a Winger for Liga MX Femenil side Juárez.

In 2018, she started her career in UNAM. In 2019, she was transferred to Toluca. In 2020, she joined to Cruz Azul. Since 2023, she is part of Juárez.
