= Marie-Morgane Sieber =

French footballer (born 2002)

Personal information
- Full name: Marie-Morgane Jacqueline Sieber
- Date of birth: 15 July 2002 (age 24)
- Place of birth: Colmar, France
- Height: 1.80 m (5 ft 11 in)
- Position: Goalkeeper

Team information
- Current team: Marseille
- Number: 1

Youth career
- 2010–2014: AS Ribeauvillé
- 2014–2015: Racing HW 96
- 2015–2019: SC Freiburg
- 2019–2020: Vendenheim

Senior career*
Years	Team	Apps	(Gls)
2019–2020	Vendenheim	4	(0)
2020–2021	Strasbourg	4	(0)
2021–2023	Rodez	40	(0)
2023–2026	Guingamp	41	(0)
2026–	Marseille	0	(0)

International career^{‡}
2018	France U16	3	(0)
2018–2019	France U17	8	(0)
2020	France U19	2	(0)
2019–2022	France U20	6	(0)
2022–2025	France U23	8	(0)
- * Club domestic league appearances and goals as of 6 May 2026 ‡ National team caps and goals as of 3 April 2025

Marie-Morgane Jacqueline Sieber (born 15 July 2002) is a French professional footballer who plays as a goalkeeper for Première Ligue club Marseille.

== International career ==
Sieber has represented France at various youth levels. In October 2024, she received her first call-up to the France national team.

== Honours ==
Rodez

- Seconde Ligue: 2021–22
