= C.F. Monterrey (women) =

Mexican professional women's football club

Monterrey Femenil
- Full name: Club de Fútbol Monterrey Femenil
- Nickname: Las Rayadas
- Founded: 2016; 10 years ago
- Ground: Estadio BBVA; Guadalupe, Nuevo León
- Capacity: 53,500
- Owner: FEMSA
- Chairman: Dennis te Kloese
- Manager: Amandine Miquel
- League: Liga Femenil
- Clausura 2026: Regular phase: 2nd Final phase: runners-up
Home colours	Away colours	Third colours

Club de Fútbol Monterrey Femenil, also known as Rayadas de Monterrey or simply Rayadas, is a Mexican professional women's football club based in Guadalupe, Nuevo León that competes in the Liga Femenil. The club has been the women's section of Monterrey, based in Monterrey, Nuevo León since 2016. The team plays its home matches at the Estadio BBVA.

Monterrey Femenil is one of only five clubs that have been able to win the Liga Femenil title, obtaining the league title in four occasions.

The club plays a local derby known as the Clásico Regiomontano femenil against city rivals Tigres UANL.

== History ==
=== Founding and first league tournament ===
Club de Fútbol Monterrey Femenil was founded on December 5, 2016, the same day that Liga MX Femenil was announced. Gustavo Leal was appointed as the first manager of the team ahead of the first tournament of the league (Apertura 2017). Monterrey Femenil's first league match in history was a 5–2 victory at home against Necaxa on July 30, 2017.

Despite good results, Leal and the club decided to part ways on October 12, 2017. Assistant manager Eliud Contreras was appointed as interim manager for the rest of the Apertura 2017 tournament. Monterrey Femenil ended the Apertura 2017 on the fourth place in the general standings, but didn't qualify to the playoffs due to finishing in the third place of its group with 31 points.

=== Multiple league finals and first title ===
After not qualifying for the playoffs in the Apertura 2017 tournament, the club decided to appoint former Monterrey player and long-time assistant manager of the men's first team, Héctor Becerra, as the new manager of the team on December 5, 2017.

Under Becerra's management, Monterrey reached its first league final in the Clausura 2018 against city rivals Tigres. This final represented the first of many Clásico Regiomontano finals to come in the Liga MX Femenil. Tigres ended up defeating Monterrey on penalties (2–4) after a 4–4 draw on aggregate. The second leg of this final at the Estadio BBVA was at the time the highest attended club match in women's football history.

Monterrey once again reached the league final in the Clausura 2019. The rival on turn was once again Tigres. Similar to the Clausura 2018, Tigres ended up winning the final again with an aggregate scoreline of 3–2.

In the Apertura 2019, Monterrey reached the final once again and for the third time, the rival was once again Tigres. Unlike the previous two finals, Monterrey was able to win this final after defeating Tigres 2–1 on aggregate. This was the first title in history for the club.

Although the Clausura 2020 tournament was canceled by the league due to the COVID-19 pandemic, Monterrey's successful run of consecutive league finals continued in the Guard1anes 2020 tournament. Like the previous three finals that Monterrey had played, the rival in turn was once again Tigres. Unlike the previous final between these two clubs (Apertura 2019), Tigres was able to crown themselves champions after beating Monterrey on penalties (3–2) after a 1–1 draw on aggregate.

=== 2021 to 2026 ===
After Monterrey was eliminated in the semi-finals of the Guard1anes 2021 tournament playoffs by Tigres, thus ending a run of three consecutive league finals, the club announced that Héctor Becerra was being relieved of his duties as manager on June 8, 2021, after more than three years as manager of the team. During Becerra's tenure as manager, the team won its first title in history and reach four league finals (won one and lost three). Former Pachuca manager, Eva Espejo, was appointed as the new manager of the team on June 13, 2021.

With Eva Espejo as manager, the club was able to obtain its second league title by winning the Apertura 2021 tournament after defeating Tigres on penalties (1–3) after a 2–2 draw on aggregate. As a result of Monterrey winning the Apertura 2021 league title, Espejo also became the first woman manager in history to win the Liga MX Femenil title.

On the Clausura 2022, Monterrey ended the regular phase of the tournament in 1st place with 43 points, but it was eliminated in the semi-finals of the playoffs by Pachuca.

As the winner of the Apertura 2021 tournament, Monterrey qualified to play the 2022 Campeón de Campeones final against the Clausura 2022 champions Guadalajara. Monterrey lost the final on penalties (1–3) after a 1–1 draw on aggregate.

In August 2022, Monterrey played its first international tournament when it participated on the 2022 Women's International Champions Cup. Monterrey reached the final of this tournament by beating Portland Thorns on penalties (3–2) after a 1–1 draw on regular time in the semi-finals. In the final, Monterrey was defeated by Lyon 4–0.

== Grounds ==
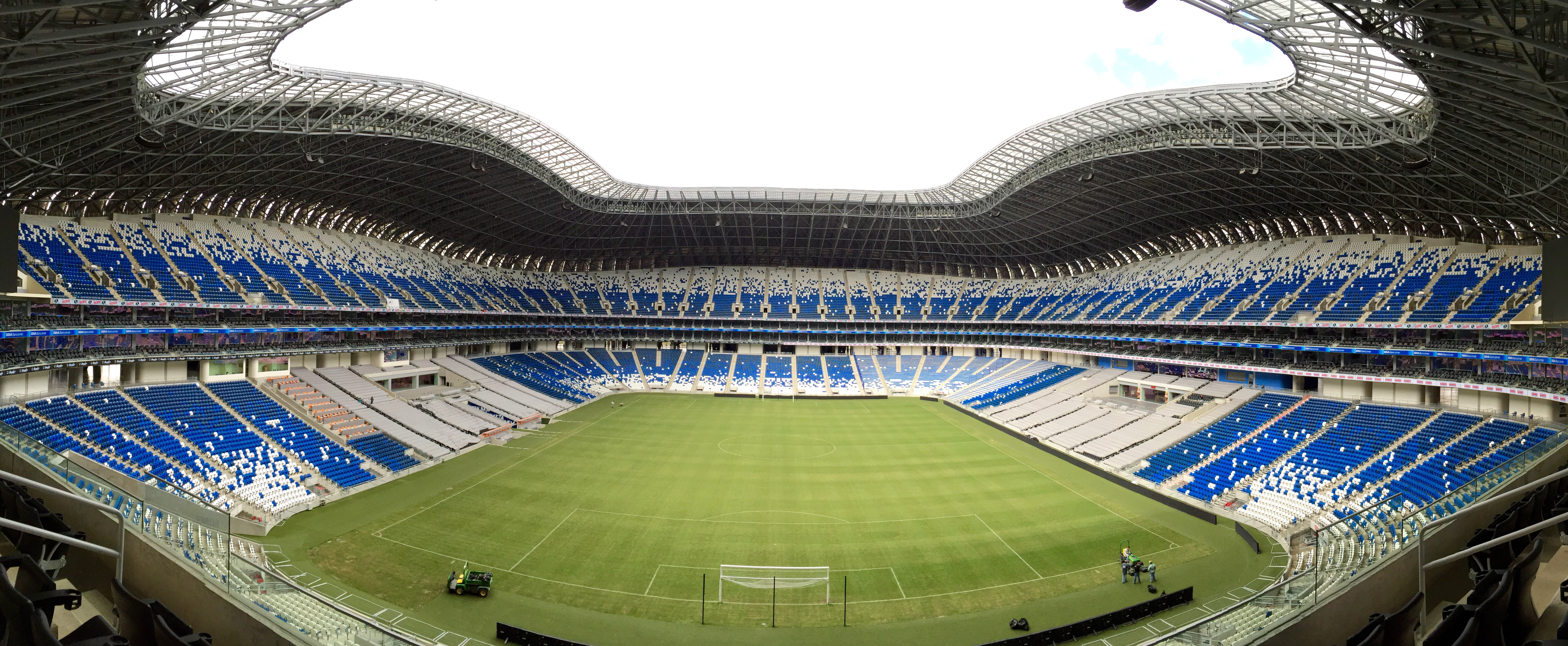
Interior view of Estadio BBVA

Monterrey Femenil play its home matches at the 53,500 seats Estadio BBVA. Colloquially known as "El Gigante de Acero" (Spanish for "The Steel Giant"), the stadium is located in the adjacent city of Guadalupe, Nuevo León, part of the Greater Monterrey area.

== Personnel ==
=== Club administration ===
Position	Staff
Sporting Chairman	(Netherlands) Dennis te Kloese
Corporate Chairman	(Mexico) Manuel Filizola
Director of football	(Mexico) David Patiño
Coordinator of football	(Mexico) Daniela Solís

Source: C.F Monterrey

=== Management staff ===
Position	Staff
Manager	(France) Amandine Miquel
Assistant manager	(France) Amaury Messuwe
Fitness trainer	(Mexico) María García
Team doctor	(Mexico) Tania Torres
Team doctor assistants	(Mexico) Rolando Valero
Team doctor assistants	(Mexico) René Arellano

Source: Liga MX Femenil

== Managerial history ==
Name	Years	Notes
(Mexico) Gustavo Leal	2017	
(Mexico) Eliud Contreras	2017	Interim manager
(Mexico) Héctor Becerra	2017–2021	
(Mexico) Eva Espejo	2021–2023	
(Costa Rica) Amelia Valverde	2024–2025	
(Mexico) Leonardo Álvarez	2025	Interim manager
(France) Amandine Miquel	2025–	

== Players ==
=== Current squad ===
As of 31 July 2026

Note: Flags indicate national team as defined under FIFA eligibility rules; some limited exceptions apply. Players may hold more than one non-FIFA nationality.

No.	Pos.	Nation	Player
2	DF	MEX	Daniela Monroy
3	DF	BRA	Daiane Limeira
5	DF	MEX	Alexandra Godínez
6	MF	MEX	Sofía Martínez
9	MF	MEX	Lourdes Bosch
10	MF	MEX	Nicole Pérez
11	MF	MEX	Valerie Vargas
12	FW	RSA	Jermaine Seoposenwe
13	GK	MEX	Alejandría Godínez
14	DF	MEX	Alejandra Lua
15	DF	MEX	Samantha Simental
17	FW	ESP	Lucía García

No.	Pos.	Nation	Player
19	FW	FRA	Lindsey Thomas
21	DF	MEX	Ashlyn Fernandez
22	MF	MEX	Diana García
23	DF	CRC	Valeria del Campo
24	MF	COL	Marcela Restrepo
25	MF	USA	Aerial Chavarin
26	FW	MEX	Katty Martínez
27	MF	MEX	Fátima Servín
28	GK	MEX	Paola Manrique
30	MF	MEX	Alice Soto
31	FW	MEX	Sara Ortiz
33	DF	MEX	Carol Cázares

== Honors ==
=== National ===
- Liga MX Femenil
  - Champions (4): Apertura 2019, Apertura 2021, Clausura 2024, Apertura 2024
  - Runners-up (3): Clausura 2018, Clausura 2019, Guardianes 2020
- Campeón de Campeonas
  - Runners-up (3): 2022, 2024, 2025
