= Tongwon University =

Coordinates: 37°19′43″N 127°24′11″E

- Type: Private
- Established: 1993
- Dean: Dr. Yonggu Yoon
- Undergraduates: 3600
- Location: Gwangju, Gyeonggi, Gyeonggi-do, South Korea
- Website: http://www.tw.ac.kr

Tongwon University (Korean: 동원대학교) is a South Korean higher institution located in Gwangju, Gyeonggi. It has 17 departments and over 3600 students. It was founded in 1993 by Dr. Tong-Won Lee.

== History ==
Founder: Dr. Tong-Won Lee

- 1993 - Tongwon College of Technology
- 1998 - Tongwon College

== Departments ==
- Digital Information and Electronics
- Computer and Information Technology
- Information and Communication
- Architecture
- Fire Safety Management
- Interior Architecture
- e-Business
- Computer Animation
- Mobile Contents and Internet
- Publishing and Media
- Industrial Design
- Secretary and Administration
- Library and Education Service
- Tourism
- Accounting and Tax Information
- Hotel and Food Service
- Real Estate Consulting
- Management
- Child Welfare
- Hairdressing and Aesthetics
- Health and Medical Information
- Media and Creative Writing
- Leisure Sports
