= Descanso (spider) =

Descanso Temporal range: Neogene– Present

Scientific classification
- Kingdom: Animalia
- Phylum: Arthropoda
- Subphylum: Chelicerata
- Class: Arachnida
- Order: Araneae
- Infraorder: Araneomorphae
- Family: Salticidae
- Subfamily: Salticinae
- Genus: Descanso; Peckham & Peckham, 1892

Type species
- D. vagus Peckham & Peckham, 1892

Species
- 10, see text

Genus of spiders

Descanso is a genus of jumping spiders that was first described by George and Elizabeth Peckham in 1892. The name is derived from Spanish descanso, meaning "resting place (of a dead person)", from the verb descansar "to (have a) rest."

== Species ==
As of June 2019 it contains ten species, found in Colombia, Peru, Brazil, Panama, and on Hispaniola:

- Descanso chapoda Peckham & Peckham, 1892 – Brazil
- Descanso discicollis (Taczanowski, 1878) – Peru
- Descanso formosus Bryant, 1943 – Hispaniola
- Descanso insolitus Chickering, 1946 – Panama
- Descanso magnus Bryant, 1943 – Hispaniola
- Descanso montanus Bryant, 1943 – Hispaniola
- Descanso peregrinus Chickering, 1946 – Panama, Colombia
- Descanso sobrius Galiano, 1986 – Brazil
- Descanso vagus Peckham & Peckham, 1892 (type) – Brazil
- Descanso ventrosus Galiano, 1986 – Brazil
