= Jana Xin =

Spanish footballer (born 2003)

Personal information
- Full name: Jana Xin Henseler Gallego
- Date of birth: 29 September 2003 (age 23)
- Place of birth: China
- Position: Goalkeeper

Team information
- Current team: Alavés
- Number: 25

Youth career
- 2017–2019: Atlético Madrid

Senior career*
Years	Team	Apps	(Gls)
2019–2021	Atlético Madrid	0	(0)
2019–2021	Atlético Madrid B	17	(0)
2021–	Alavés	5	(0)

International career^{‡}
2021–	Spain U19	2	(0)
Medal record
Women's football
Representing Spain
FIFA U-20 Women's World Cup
Winner	2022 Costa Rica
UEFA Women's Under-19 Championship
Winner	2022 Czech Republic
- * Club domestic league appearances and goals as of 18 April 2022 ‡ National team caps and goals as of 21:49, 1 November 2021 (UTC)

Jana Xin Henseler Gallego (born 29 September 2003) is a professional footballer who plays as a goalkeeper for Primera División club Deportivo Alavés. Born in China, she represents Spain internationally.

== Early life ==
Jana Xin was adopted by a German father and a Spanish Asturian mother. Her sister is also adopted from China.

== Club career ==
Jana Xin started her career at Atlético Madrid. On 18 July 2021, she transferred to newly promoted Alavés, signing a two-year contract, having impressed the Basque club with her performance against them while playing for Atlético's B-team in the second division.

== Personal life ==
Jana Xin is of Chinese origin and has Spanish nationality.

== Honours ==
Spain U19

- UEFA Women's Under-19 Championship: 2022

Spain U20

- FIFA U-20 Women's World Cup: 2022
