= Fernanda Canseco =

Mexican footballer (born 2004)

Personal information
- Full name: María Fernanda Canseco Bracamontes
- Date of birth: 7 April 2004 (age 22)
- Place of birth: Acapulco, Guerrero, Mexico
- Height: 1.68 m (5 ft 6 in)
- Position: Centre-back

Team information
- Current team: Pachuca
- Number: 34

Senior career*
Years	Team	Apps	(Gls)
2018–	Pachuca	73	(3)
2025–2026	→ Mazatlán (loan)	11	(0)

International career^{‡}
2022	Mexico U-20		
- * Club domestic league appearances and goals as of 9 February 2026 ‡ National team caps and goals as of 14 July 2023

María Fernanda Canseco Bracamontes (born 7 April 2004) is a Mexican professional footballer who plays as a centre-back for Liga MX Femenil side Pachuca.

== Career ==
Canseco started her professional football career in 2018 with Pachuca.

== International career ==
Canseco was also part of the team that participated in the 2022 FIFA U-20 Women's World Cup in Costa Rica.
