= Daeduk College =

Coordinates: 36.3906°N 127.3655°E

- Established: 1980
- Location: 48, Jang-dong, Yuseong-gu, Daejeon, 300-715 Daejeon, Korea, Daejeon, Daejeon, South Korea
- Campus: Urban(Daejeon Campus)
- Website: www.ddc.ac.kr

- Daeduk College
- Hangul: 대덕대학
- Hanja: 大德大學
- RR: Daedeok daehak
- MR: Taedŏk taehak

Daeduk College is a private technical college in the Yuseong-gu district of Daejeon, a major city of South Korea. The current president is Han Sung-dong (한숭동). The college employs about 100 instructors.

== Academics ==
Academic offerings are divided among divisions of

- Engineering
- Humanities
- Social science
- Arts

== History ==
The school opened in 1980 as Chungnam-Gyeongsang Technical College (충남경상전문대학).

== See also ==
- Education in South Korea
- List of universities and colleges in South Korea
