= Alejandra Lua =

Mexican footballer (born 1991)

Personal information
- Full name: Alejandra Calderón Lua
- Date of birth: 8 January 1991 (age 35)
- Place of birth: Michoacán, Mexico
- Height: 1.70 m (5 ft 7 in)
- Position: Right back

Team information
- Current team: Monterrey
- Number: 14

Senior career*
Years	Team	Apps	(Gls)
2016–2020	Morelia	37	(9)
2020–2021	Querétaro	28	(0)
2021–	Monterrey	106	(2)
- * Club domestic league appearances and goals as of 4 June 2023 ‡ National team caps and goals as of 12 March 2022

Alejandra Calderón Lua (born 8 January 1991) is a Mexican professional footballer who plays as a Right back for Liga MX Femenil side Monterrey.

== Career ==
In 2016, she started her career in Morelia. In 2020, she was transferred to Querétaro. In 2021, she joined to Monterrey.
