= Descanso, Santa Catarina =

Coordinates: 26°49′33″S 53°30′07″W

- Municipality
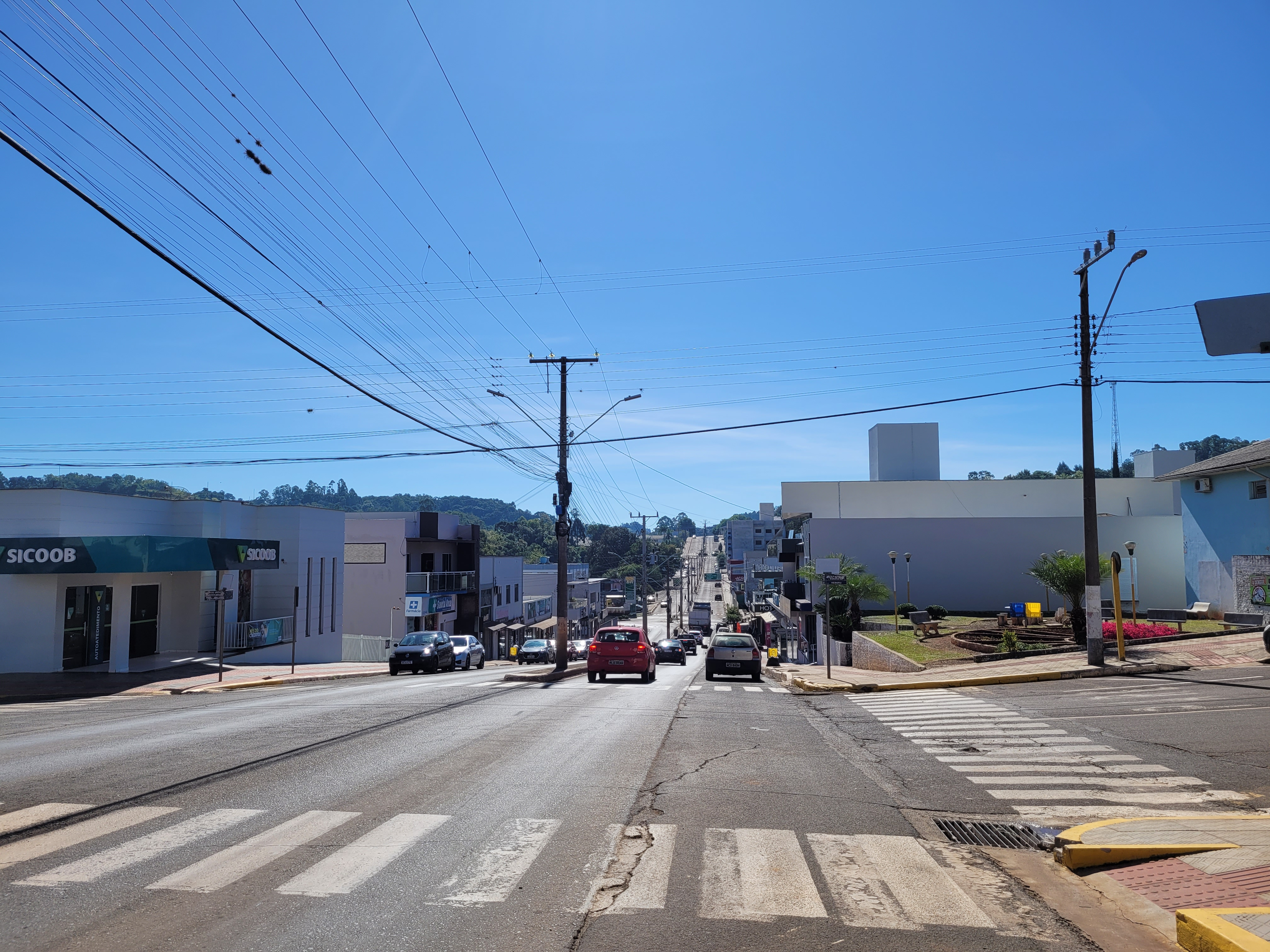
- Martin Piaseski Ave., Descanso

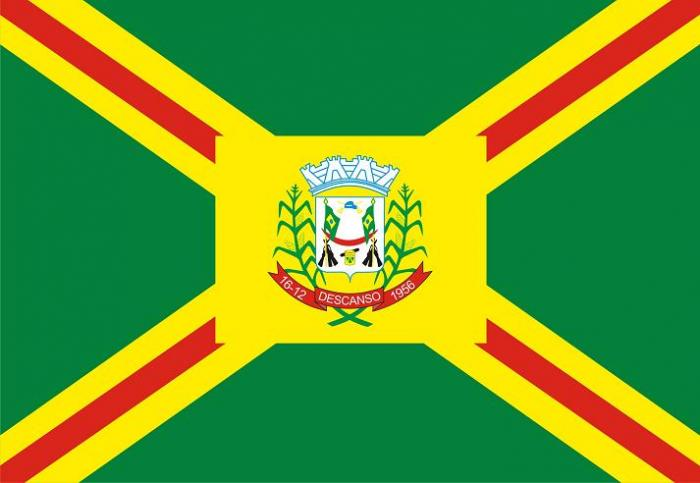
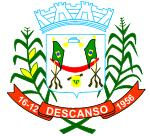
- Flag Coat of arms
- Interactive map of Descanso, Santa Catarina
- Country: Brazil
- Region: South
- State: Santa Catarina
- Mesoregion: Oeste Catarinense

Population (2020)
  - Total: 8,192
- Time zone: UTC -3

Descanso, Santa Catarina is a municipality in the state of Santa Catarina in the South region of Brazil.

== See also ==
- List of municipalities in Santa Catarina
