= C.F. Pachuca (women) =

Mexican professional women's football club

Pachuca Femenil
- Full name: Club de Fútbol Pachuca Femenil
- Nicknames: Tuzas (Gophers); Las Diosas del Viento (The Goddesses of The Wind)
- Founded: 5 December 2016; 9 years ago
- Ground: Estadio Hidalgo; Pachuca, Hidalgo
- Capacity: 25,922
- Owner: Grupo Pachuca
- Chairman: Armando Martínez Patiño
- Manager: Montse Tomé
- League: Liga Femenil
- Clausura 2026: Regular phase: 4th Final phase: Semi-finals
- Website: https://tuzos.com.mx/webtuzos/2022/
Home colours	Away colours

Club de Fútbol Pachuca Femenil, simply known as Pachuca Femenil or Pachuca, is a Mexican professional women's football club based in Pachuca, Hidalgo, that competes in Liga Femenil, the top women's division of Mexican football. It has been the women's section of Pachuca since 2016. The Estadio Hidalgo serves as the venue for the team home matches.

Pachuca Femenil is one of the most competitive teams in Liga MX Femenil, having reached the league final in four occasions, and winning one of them, being one of the five clubs that have clinched the league title since its creation in 2016. Pachuca Femenil is also the only women's football team to have won every official women’s football competition in Mexico by winning the league, the Copa MX Femenil and the Campeón de Campeonas.

== History ==
=== Founding and first title ===
Club de Fútbol Pachuca Femenil was founded on December 5, 2016, the same day that Liga MX Femenil was announced to the public. Eva Espejo was appointed by the club as the first manager of the team in history in early 2017.

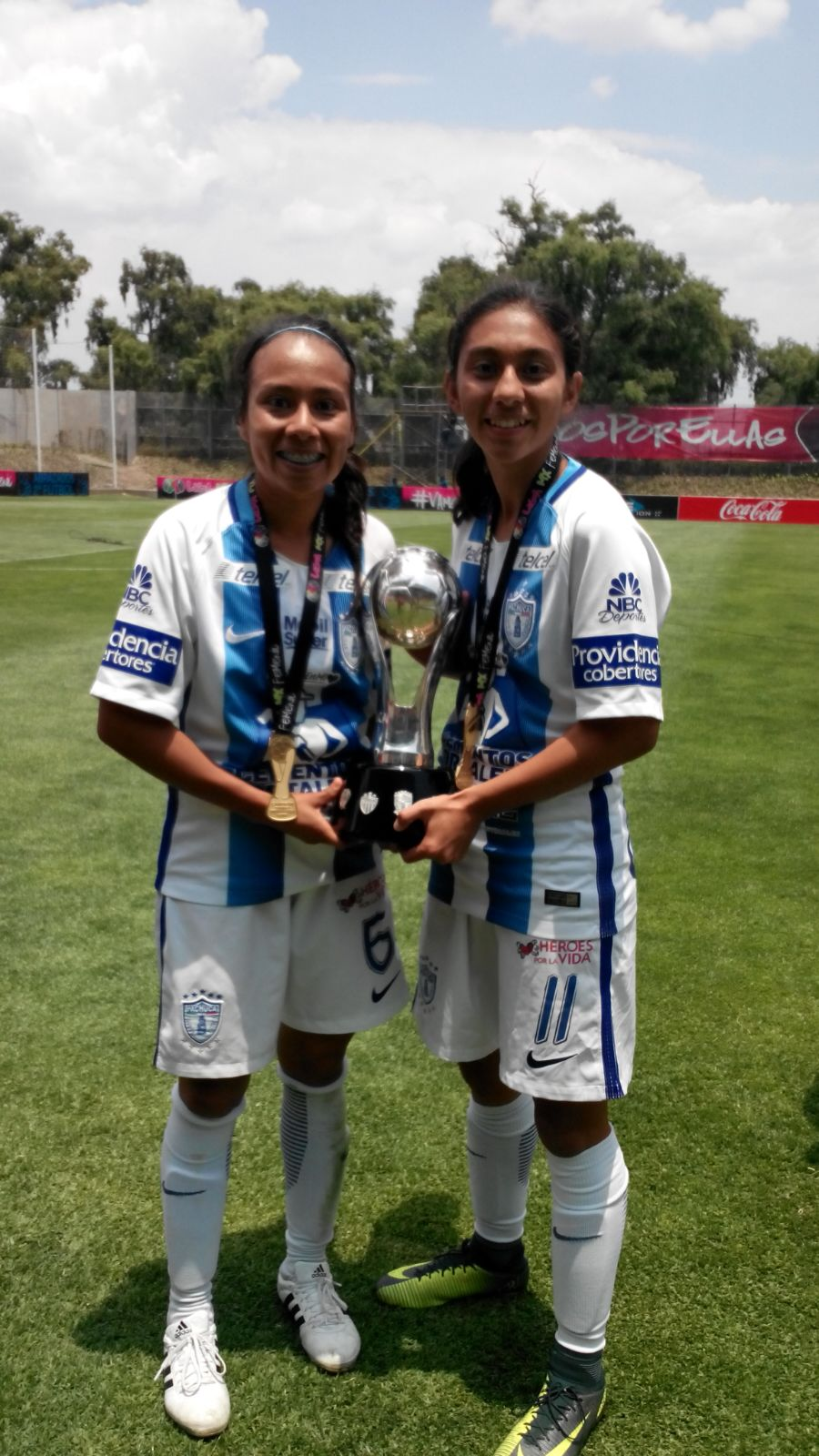
Pachuca Femenil players Karla Nieto and Fátima Arellano holding the 2017 Copa MX Femenil trophy.

Prior to the inaugural season of the Liga MX Femenil in the second half of 2017, Pachuca and 11 other teams participated in a preparation tournament organized by the Federación Mexicana de Fútbol (FMF) called the Copa MX Femenil. during this competition, Pachuca went undefeated and emerged as the champions by defeating Tijuana in the final with a 9–1 score. By winning this tournament, Pachuca became the first women's football team in Mexico to win an official tournament.

=== First league tournament ===
Pachuca Femenil inaugurated the Liga MX Femenil by playing the league's first match in history on July 28, 2017 against Pumas at the Estadio Hidalgo as part of the Apertura 2017 tournament. The match ended in a 3–0 victory in favor of Pachuca.

Pachuca Femenil would end up having a successful Apertura 2017 tournament by finishing the regular phase of the tournament in 5th place in the general standings, classifying to the liguilla semi-finals. In the semi-finals, Pachuca defeated favorites Tigres with a 4–3 aggregate score to reach the final against Guadalajara. Pachuca ultimately lost the final to Guadalajara with a 2–3 aggregate score.

=== 2020–2023 ===
After more than three years at the helm, Eva Espejo decided to step down as manager to take the position of sporting director of the club in late 2020. During her tenure as manager, Espejo led Pachuca to its first title and league final. As sporting director, Espejo appointed Spanish manager Toña Is as her successor.

In April 2022, Juan Carlos Cacho was appointed as manager of the team near the end of the regular phase of the Clausura 2022 tournament after the previous manager, Octavio Valdez, was dismissed by the club due to indiscipline. Cachos's appointment as manager was the fourth time the club had appointed a manager since Eva Espejo step down as manager in December 2020. Under Cacho, the team had rough patch in the final games of the regular phase of the Clausura 2022, but it was able to recover to have a successful run to the final in the liguilla phase, eliminating favorites América and Monterrey in the quarter-finals and semi-finals respectively. Pachuca once again lost the final against Guadalajara with a 4–3 aggregate score.

Ahead of the Apertura 2022 tournament, Pachuca made the surprising signing of Spanish international player, Jenni Hermoso, who was previously at Barcelona. Hermoso signing with Pachuca was considered by commentators to be a sign of the growth of the Liga MX Femenil and women's football in Mexico in a relatively short period of time, as foreign players were allowed to play in the league for the first time a year prior to Hermoso's arrival to Pachuca.

With Hermoso and Charlyn Corral, Pachuca Femenil returned to a league final once more during the Clausura 2023 tournament. During this tournament, Pachuca broke the league's record of goals scored during the regular season of a tournament by scoring 53 goals, with 38 of the 53 goals being scored by Hermoso (18) and Corral (20). Pachuca finished the regular phase of the tournament in 5th place, three points away from the top of the table. In the liguilla, Pachuca defeated Guadalajara and Monterrey in the quarter-finals and semi-finals to play the final against Club América. Pachuca once again ended up falling short in the final, losing to América by a 4–2 aggregate score.

After a disappointing Apertura 2023 tournament, in which the team barely qualified to the playoffs, just to be eventually eliminated by América in the quarter-finals with a shocking 9–2 aggregate score, the club decided to sacked Juan Carlos Cacho as their manager. On November 30, 2023, the club announced that Cachos’ assistant, Oscar Torres, was being appointed as the new manager of the team.

=== First league title ===
Pachuca Femenil returned to a league final during the Clausura 2024 tournament after having a successful regular phase campaign in which the team ended in second place of the standings. In the final, Pachuca faced América once again, but unlike the final both teams played two years prior, Pachuca this time was able to take advantage of their home ground by defeating América 3–0 in the first-leg of the final, which was a result América was unable to overcome in the second-leg, with the final aggregate score being 3–2 in favor of Pachuca and therefore giving Pachuca their first league title in history.

== Stadium ==
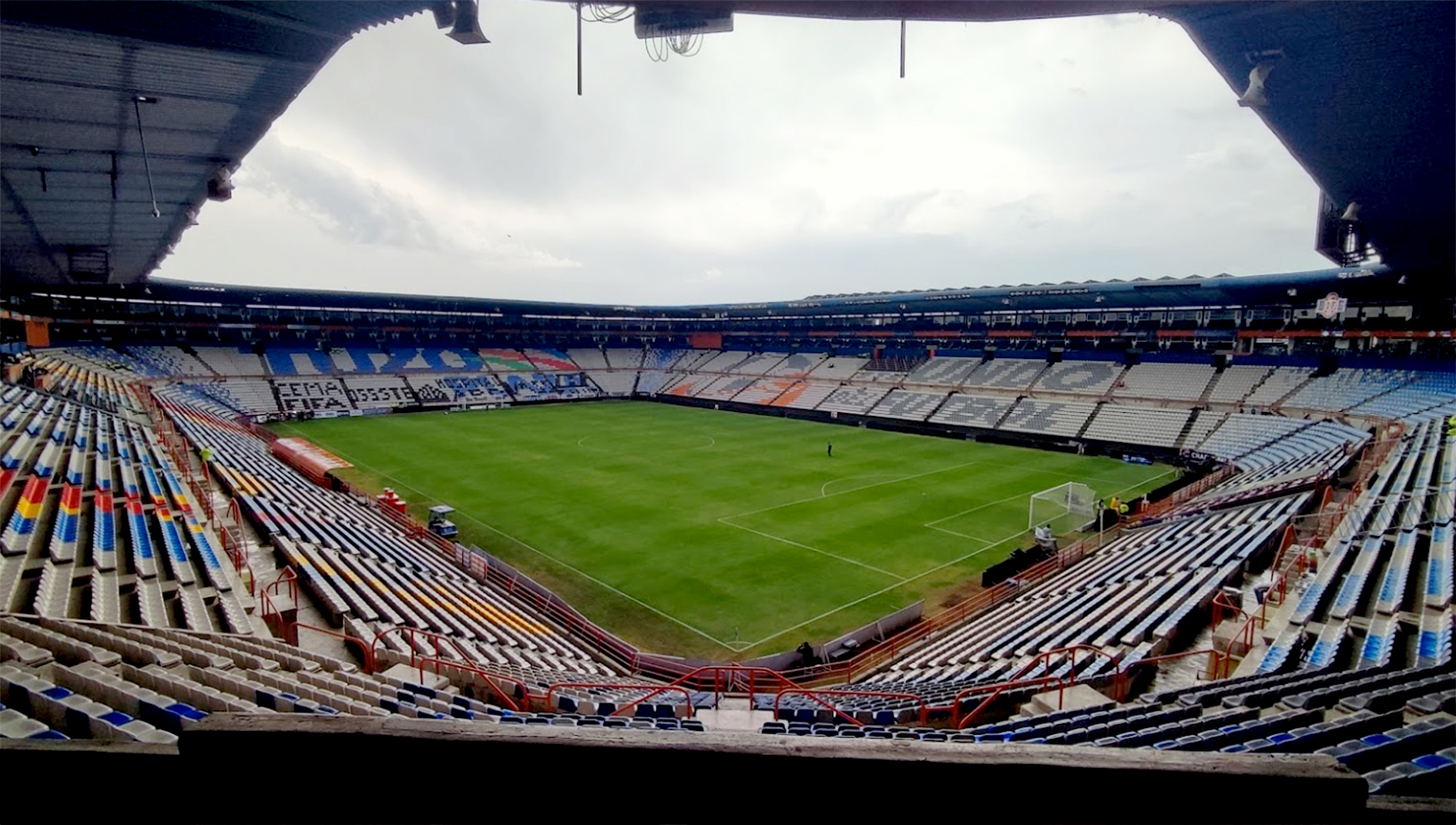
Interior view of Estadio Hidalgo.

The Estadio Hidalgo serves as the home venus of Pachuca Femenil. The first match played by Pachuca at this stadium was the Liga MX Femenil inaugural match against Pumas during the Apertura 2017 tournament.

Additionally, Pachuca Femenil also has an exclusive training facility, which is located within the larger Pachuca training complex. This facility, named the Malena Patiño Pavilion in honor of the mother of Grupo Pachuca's president, Jesús Martínez, was inaugurated in 2018 and it was the first training facility in Mexico built exclusively for a women's football team.

== Personnel ==
=== Club administration ===
Position	Staff
Chairman	(Mexico) Armando Martínez Patiño
Sporting director	(Mexico) Mónica Ocampo

=== Coaching staff ===
Position	Staff
Manager	(Spain) Montse Tomé
Assistant manager	(Spain) David Bellver
Fitness coach	(Mexico) Gabriel Montoya
Team doctor	(Mexico) Elizabeth Martínez
Team doctor assistant	(Mexico) Mariana Fuentes

=== Managerial history ===
Name	Years
(Mexico) Eva Espejo	2017–2020
(Spain) Toña Is	2021
(Mexico) Jaime Correa	2021
(Mexico) Octavio Valdez	2022
(Mexico) Juan Carlos Cacho	2022–2023
(Mexico) Oscar Fernando Torres	2024–2026
(Spain) Montse Tomé	2026–

== Players ==
=== Current squad ===
As of 31 July 2026

Note: Flags indicate national team as defined under FIFA eligibility rules; some limited exceptions apply. Players may hold more than one non-FIFA nationality.

No.	Pos.	Nation	Player
1	GK	MEX	Esthefanny Barreras
2	DF	MEX	Kenti Robles
5	DF	MEX	Berenice Ibarra
6	MF	MEX	Karla Nieto
7	DF	MEX	Jocelyn Orejel
8	DF	COL	Yirleidys Minota
9	FW	MEX	Charlyn Corral
10	MF	MEX	Nina Nicosia
11	FW	MEX	Allison Veloz
12	MF	MEX	Sydney Becerra
13	FW	BRA	Eudimilla
16	MF	MEX	Ella Sanchez
17	DF	COL	Kelly Caicedo

No.	Pos.	Nation	Player
18	MF	USA	Michelle González
19	MF	MEX	Abril Fragoso
21	MF	USA	Mackenzee Vance
22	GK	MEX	Carmen López
23	DF	USA	Daniela Flores
25	FW	BRA	Aline Gomes
26	FW	MEX	Paola García
28	MF	MEX	Julia Valadez
30	FW	NGR	Chinwendu Ihezuo
32	DF	MEX	Alexa Martínez
33	FW	MEX	Andrea Flores
34	DF	MEX	María Canseco
35	MF	MEX	Janeth Valdez

== Honours ==
=== National ===
- Liga MX Femenil
  - Champions (1): Clausura 2025
  - Runners-up (3): Apertura 2017, Clausura 2022, Clausura 2023
- Copa MX Femenil
  - Champions (1): 2017
- Campeón de Campeonas
  - Champions (1): 2025
