= 2022–23 Liga MX Femenil season =

Mexican women's football league season

Liga MX Femenil
- Season: 2022–23
- Champions: Apertura: UANL (5th title); Clausura: América (2nd title)
- Matches: 306
- Goals: 976 (3.19 per match)
- Top goalscorer: Apertura: Mia Fishel (17 goals); Clausura: Charlyn Corral (20 goals)
- Biggest home win: Apertura: Guadalajara 7–0 Mazatlán (28 August 2022); Clausura: Pachuca 10–2 Toluca (16 January 2023)
- Biggest away win: Apertura: Mazatlán 0–8 UANL (15 August 2022); Clausura: Necaxa 0–6 América (30 January 2023); Mazatlán 0–6 Guadalajara (27 February 2023); Mazatlán 0–6 UNAM (24 April 2023)
- Highest scoring: Apertura: Puebla 6–2 Atlético San Luis (28 July 2022); Mazatlán 0–8 UANL (15 August 2022); Clausura: Pachuca 10–2 Toluca (16 January 2023)
- Longest winning run: Apertura: 8 matches Guadalajara; Clausura: 9 matches Monterrey
- Longest unbeaten run: Apertura: 8 matches Guadalajara; Clausura: 12 matches Monterrey
- Longest winless run: Apertura: 9 matches Necaxa; Clausura: 8 matches Necaxa
- Longest losing run: Apertura: 8 matches Santos Laguna; Clausura: 8 matches Necaxa
- Highest attendance: Apertura: 31,537; UANL 2–2 Monterrey (30 September 2022); Clausura: 30,877; Monterrey 1–1 UANL (25 March 2023)
- Lowest attendance: Apertura: 129; Atlas 0–2 Tijuana (24 August 2022); Clausura: 148; Guadalajara 2–1 Puebla (10 February 2023)
- Total attendance: Apertura: 282,720; Clausura: 367,442
- Average attendance: Apertura: 2,005; Clausura: 2,483
- Stats are from the regular phase only Source: Liga MX Femenil

The 2022–23 Liga MX Femenil season was the sixth season of the premier women's football league in Mexico. The season began on 8 July 2022 and finished on 10 July 2023.

== Stadiums and locations ==
América	Atlas	Atlético San Luis	Cruz Azul	Guadalajara
Estadio Azteca	Estadio Jalisco	Estadio Alfonso Lastras	Estadio Azteca	Estadio Akron
Capacity: 81,070	Capacity: 55,110	Capacity: 25,111	Capacity: 81,070	Capacity: 46,232
Juárez	León	Mazatlán	Monterrey	Necaxa
Estadio Olímpico Benito Juárez	Estadio León	Estadio de Mazatlán	Estadio BBVA	Estadio Victoria
Capacity: 19,703	Capacity: 31,297	Capacity: 25,000	Capacity: 51,348	Capacity: 23,851
Pachuca	Puebla	Querétaro	Santos Laguna	Tijuana
Estadio Hidalgo	Estadio Cuauhtémoc	Estadio Corregidora	Estadio Corona	Estadio Caliente
Capacity: 27,512	Capacity: 51,726	Capacity: 33,162	Capacity: 29,237	Capacity: 27,333
Toluca	UANL	UNAM		
Estadio Nemesio Díez	Estadio Universitario	Estadio Olímpico Universitario		
Capacity: 31,000	Capacity: 41,886	Capacity: 48,297		

== Alternate venues ==
- América – Cancha Centenario No. 5 (Capacity: 1,000)
- Atlas – Estadio Colomos Alfredo 'Pistache' Torres (Capacity: 3,000)
- Atlas – CECAF (Capacity: 1,000)
- Cruz Azul – Instalaciones La Noria (Capacity: 2,000)
- Guadalajara – Verde Valle (Capacity: 800)
- León – La Esmeralda Cancha Sintética (Capacity: 1,000)
- Mazatlán – Centro Deportivo Benito Juárez (Capacity: 1,000)
- Monterrey – El Barrial (Capacity: 570)
- Querétaro - Estadio Olímpico Alameda (Capacity: 4,600)
- Toluca – Instalaciones Metepec (Capacity: 1,000)
- UANL – Instalaciones Zuazua (Capacity: 800)
- UNAM – La Cantera (Capacity: 2,000)
Location of the 2022–23 Liga MX Femenil teams
Location of the 2022–23 Liga MX Femenil teams in Greater Mexico City

== Personnel and kits ==
Team	Chairman	Head coach	Kit manufacturer	Shirt sponsor(s)
América	Santiago Baños	(Spain) Ángel Villacampa	Nike	AT&T
Atlas	José Riestra	(Mexico) Fabiola Vargas	Charly	Caliente
Atlético San Luis	Alberto Marrero	(Mexico) Fernando Samayoa	Sporelli	Canel's
Cruz Azul	Víctor Velázquez	(Mexico) Cecilia Cabrera (Interim)	Joma	Cemento Cruz Azul
Guadalajara	Amaury Vergara	(Mexico) Juan Pablo Alfaro	Puma	Sello Rojo
Juárez	Miguel Ángel Garza	(Spain) Mila Martínez	Sporelli	
León	Jesús Martínez Murguia	(Mexico) Alejandro Corona	Charly	Cementos Fortaleza
Mazatlán	Mauricio Lanz González	(Mexico) José Alonso Madrigal (Interim)	Pirma	Banco Azteca
Monterrey	José Antonio Noriega	(Mexico) Eva Espejo	Puma	BBVA
Necaxa	Ernesto Tinajero Flores	(Mexico) Jorge Gómez	Pirma	Rolcar
Pachuca	Armando Martínez Patiño	(Mexico) Juan Carlos Cacho	Charly	Cementos Fortaleza
Puebla	Manuel Jiménez García	(Mexico) Pablo Luna	Pirma	Banco Azteca
Querétaro	Vacant	(Mexico) Leonardo Álvarez	Charly	Pedigree Petfoods
Santos Laguna	Dante Elizalde	(Mexico) Jorge Campos	Charly	Soriana
Tijuana	Jorge Hank Inzunsa	(Mexico) Juan Manuel Romo	Charly	Caliente
Toluca	Francisco Suinaga	(Mexico) Gabriel Velasco	Under Armour	arabela
UANL	Mauricio Culebro	(Canada) Carmelina Moscato	Adidas	Cemex
UNAM	Leopoldo Silva Gutiérrez	(Mexico) Jhonathan Lazcano	Nike	DHL Express

== Format ==
- The Liga MX Femenil season is split into two championships: the Torneo Apertura 2022 (opening tournament) and the Torneo Clausura 2023 (closing tournament). Each is contested in an identical format and includes the same eighteen teams.
- Since 2019–20 season the teams compete in a single group, the best eight of the general table qualify to the championship playoffs.

== Torneo Apertura ==
The Torneo Apertura 2022 is the first tournament of the season. The tournament began on 8 July 2022.

=== Regular season ===
==== Standings ====
Pos	Team	Pld	W	D	L	GF	GA	GD	Pts	Qualification or relegation
1	Guadalajara	17	14	1	2	36	10	+26	43	Advance to Liguilla (Note: The first 8 places in the table qualify for the Liguilla.)
2	Monterrey	17	13	3	1	46	16	+30	42	Advance to Liguilla
3	UANL (C)	17	12	2	3	48	13	+35	38	Advance to Liguilla
4	América	17	11	3	3	37	16	+21	36	Advance to Liguilla
5	Tijuana	17	8	5	4	34	25	+9	29	Advance to Liguilla
6	Toluca	17	8	2	7	27	29	−2	26	Advance to Liguilla
7	Pachuca	17	8	1	8	35	25	+10	25	Advance to Liguilla
8	Cruz Azul	17	7	4	6	16	16	0	25	Advance to Liguilla
9	UNAM	17	7	3	7	30	36	−6	24	
10	Atlas	17	6	5	6	25	25	0	23	
11	Juárez	17	7	1	9	24	28	−4	22	
12	León	17	6	3	8	22	26	−4	21	
13	Atlético San Luis	17	7	0	10	23	36	−13	21	
14	Santos Laguna	17	6	1	10	24	36	−12	19	
15	Querétaro	17	3	3	11	16	31	−15	12	
16	Puebla	17	3	2	12	20	38	−18	11	
17	Mazatlán	17	3	2	12	15	49	−34	11	
18	Necaxa	17	1	5	11	12	35	−23	8	

Updated to match(es) played on 24 October 2022. Source: Liga MX Femenil
Rules for classification: 1) Points; 2) Goal difference; 3) Number of goals scored; 4) Head-to-head results between tied teams; 5) Number of goals scored away; 6) Highest relegation coefficient; 7) Fair Play points
(C) Champions

==== Positions by Round ====
Qualification to quarter-finals
Last place in table

Team ╲ Round	1	2	3	4	5	6	7	8	9	10	11	12	13	14	15	16	17
Guadalajara	7	2	1	1	1	1	1	1	1	1	1	1	1	1	1	1	1
Monterrey	4	9	5	7	7	4	4	3	3	4	3	2	2	2	2	2	2
UANL	15	14	10	6	3	3	2	2	2	2	2	3	3	3	3	3	3
América	8	3	2	2	4	5	5	5	4	3	4	4	4	4	4	4	4
Tijuana	12	8	6	8	6	6	7	6	6	5	5	5	5	5	5	5	5
Toluca	13	11	7	4	5	8	6	7	8	7	8	7	7	7	8	9	6
Pachuca	1	7	12	9	11	12	8	10	7	11	7	6	6	6	6	6	7
Cruz Azul	6	5	3	5	8	10	11	8	10	8	9	8	8	8	7	7	8
UNAM	2	1	4	3	2	2	3	4	5	6	6	9	9	9	9	10	9
Atlas	9	6	9	10	9	7	9	9	9	9	11	11	11	10	10	8	10
Juárez	14	12	13	14	13	14	16	14	12	12	13	12	12	11	12	11	11
León	3	4	11	12	10	11	12	13	11	10	10	10	10	12	14	13	12
Atlético San Luis	11	15	17	18	17	17	14	12	14	14	16	14	14	13	11	14	13
Santos Laguna	5	13	8	11	12	9	10	11	13	13	14	16	16	14	13	12	14
Querétaro	10	10	14	15	16	15	17	16	16	16	15	13	13	15	15	15	15
Puebla	18	17	18	13	15	16	13	15	15	15	12	15	15	16	16	16	16
Mazatlán	17	16	15	16	14	13	15	17	17	18	17	17	17	17	17	18	17
Necaxa	16	18	16	17	18	18	18	18	18	17	18	18	18	18	18	17	18

Updated to match(es) played on 24 October 2022. Source: Liga MX Femenil

==== Results ====
Each team plays once all other teams in 17 rounds regardless of it being a home or away match.

Home \ Away	AME	ATL	ASL	CAZ	GUA	JUA	LEO	MAZ	MON	NEC	PAC	PUE	QUE	SAN	TIJ	TOL	UNL	UNM
América	—	—	—	3–0	—	2–0	—	—	1–2	3–1	2–1	—	—	2–0	—	2–1	0–1	6–1
Atlas	2–2	—	2–3	—	1–3	—	—	5–0	—	—	—	2–0	—	2–1	0–2	2–2	1–0	—
Atlético San Luis	1–3	—	—	2–1	0–1	2–0	—	—	3–4	—	2–4	—	1–0	0–2	—	—	1–5	—
Cruz Azul	—	0–0	—	—	—	—	—	1–0	—	3–0	1–0	2–0	—	0–1	1–1	—	0–0	—
Guadalajara	2–2	—	—	3–0	—	—	—	7–0	—	3–0	—	—	2–0	3–1	2–1	2–0	1–0	—
Juárez	—	0–2	—	1–2	1–0	—	2–4	—	—	3–0	—	—	2–1	4–1	0–1	—	—	1–4
León	2–2	1–1	0–1	0–2	0–1	—	—	3–1	—	—	—	—	0–1	—	—	1–2	2–0	—
Mazatlán	0–3	—	1–3	—	—	1–2	—	—	0–1	—	3–1	1–0	—	—	0–5	3–1	0–8	—
Monterrey	—	4–1	—	1–0	1–0	1–1	3–0	—	—	—	—	3–1	—	—	—	5–2	—	6–0
Necaxa	—	0–2	0–2	—	—	—	0–2	1–1	0–4	—	0–1	3–3	—	1–1	—	—	—	2–2
Pachuca	—	4–0	—	—	0–1	3–2	3–0	—	0–1	—	—	3–0	4–1	—	—	—	—	3–0
Puebla	1–0	—	6–2	—	2–3	0–3	0–3	—	—	—	—	—	—	1–3	3–2	—	—	1–2
Querétaro	0–1	0–0	—	0–1	—	—	—	2–2	3–2	0–2	—	1–0	—	—	1–2	2–3	—	—
Santos Laguna	—	—	—	—	—	—	1–2	3–2	0–4	—	3–2	—	4–3	—	1–2	—	1–4	1–2
Tijuana	1–3	—	2–0	—	—	—	2–2	—	2–2	1–1	3–3	—	—	—	—	1–0	—	4–1
Toluca	—	—	2–0	2–0	—	1–2	—	—	—	2–1	3–2	1–1	—	2–0	—	—	1–4	—
UANL	—	—	—	—	—	3–0	—	—	2–2	2–0	3–1	4–1	4–0	—	5–2	—	—	3–0
UNAM	—	3–2	3–0	2–2	1–2	—	4–0	3–0	—	—	—	—	1–1	—	—	1–2	—	—

Updated to match(es) played on 24 October 2022. Source: Liga MX Femenil
Legend: Blue = home team win; Yellow = draw; Red = away team win.

=== Regular season statistics ===
==== Top goalscorers ====
Players sorted first by goals scored, then by last name.

Rank	Player	Club	Goals
1	(United States) Mia Fishel	UANL	17
2	(Mexico) Christina Burkenroad	Monterrey	16
3	(Mexico) Kiana Palacios	América	13
4	(Mexico) Charlyn Corral	Pachuca	12
5	(Mexico) Aylín Avilez	Monterrey	11
5	(Mexico) Renae Cuéllar	Tijuana	11
5	(United States) Angelina Hix	Tijuana	11
8	(Spain) Bea Parra	Atlético San Luis	10
9	(Mexico) Alison González	América	9
9	(Mexico) Stephany Mayor	UANL	9

Source:Liga MX Femenil

==== Hat-tricks ====
Player	For	Against	Result	Date	Round	Ref
(Mexico) Stephany Mayor	UANL	Puebla	4 – 1 (H)	5 August 2022	6	
(Mexico) Charlyn Corral	Pachuca	Tijuana	3 – 3 (A)	8 August 2022	6	
(Mexico) Katty Martínez	América	UNAM	6 – 1 (H)	17 October 2022	16	

(H) – Home; (A) – Away

=== Attendance ===
==== Per team ====
Pos	Team	Total	High	Low	Average	Change
1	UANL	69,960	31,537	4,637	8,745	+55.6%
2	Guadalajara	55,035	18,488	2,621	6,115	+1,356.0%
3	Monterrey	23,135	3,843	1,595	3,305	−49.2%^{1}
4	Pachuca	16,003	4,295	1,087	2,000	+2.1%
5	Tijuana	14,564	3,533	733	1,821	+45.1%
6	UNAM	14,168	5,838	935	1,771	+12.6%
7	América	15,223	5,332	616	1,691	−34.7%
8	Toluca	11,380	2,022	749	1,423	−10.4%
9	Atlético San Luis	11,211	2,199	511	1,246	+19.9%
10	Puebla	9,436	4,685	224	1,180	+32.7%
11	León	9,881	3,535	20	1,098	+24.5%
12	Mazatlán	6,721	2,038	433	960	+18.4%^{3}
13	Atlas	7,969	4,512	129	885	+150.0%
14	Juárez	7,925	2,251	181	881	+1.7%
15	Necaxa	6,010	863	549	668	−0.3%
16	Santos Laguna	3,272	748	211	409	−19.6%
17	Cruz Azul	1,304	186	136	163	+34.7%
18	Querétaro	0	0	0	0	−100.0%^{2}
	League total	282,720	31,537	20	2,005	+22.3%

Source: Liga MX
Notes:
Only regular season listed
1: Monterrey played its match against Toluca behind closed doors due to the weather conditions presented in Monterrey area.
2: As a result of the riot on 5 March 2022, Querétaro will play all matches behind closed doors for one year. The ban began on 7 March 2022.
3: Mazatlán played the match against Atlético San Luis behind closed doors due to the Hurricane Orlene, and the match against Pachuca due to logistical reasons.

Source: Liga MX Femenil

==== Highest and lowest ====
Highest attended					Lowest attended			
Week	Home	Score	Away	Attendance	Home	Score	Away	Attendance
1	Guadalajara	2–1	Tijuana	2,621	Juárez	1–2	Cruz Azul	181
2	América	2–0	Santos Laguna	3,411	Cruz Azul	1–1	UANL	173
3	UANL	4–0	Querétaro	5,547	Santos Laguna	3–2	Pachuca	433
4	UANL	2–0	Necaxa	4,637	Cruz Azul	0–0	Necaxa	164
5	América	0–1	UANL	5,332	Atlas	2–2	Toluca	247
6	Guadalajara	2–0	Toluca	5,540	Cruz Azul	0–1	Santos Laguna	136
7	Atlas	1–3	Guadalajara	4,512	Santos Laguna	1–2	UNAM	438
8	UANL	3–1	Pachuca	7,437	Cruz Azul	3–0	Necaxa	186
9	Juárez	1–0	Guadalajara	2,251	Atlas	0–2	Tijuana	129
10	Guadalajara	7–0	Mazatlán	6,894	Cruz Azul	2–0	Puebla	168
11	Puebla	2–3	Guadalajara	4,685	Santos Laguna	1–2	Tijuana	225
12	Guadalajara	1–0	UANL	6,544	Cruz Azul	1–0	Mazatlán	175
13	UNAM	1–2	Guadalajara	5,838	Mazatlán	0–5	Tijuana	539
14	León	0–1	Guadalajara	2,702	Atlas	2–0	Puebla	139
15	UANL	2–2	Monterrey	31,537	Puebla	1–3	Santos Laguna	487
16	Monterrey	1–0	Guadalajara	5,394	León	2–0	UANL	20
17	Guadalajara	3–0	Cruz Azul	5,196	León	1–2	Toluca	130

Source: Liga MX

1. Does not include matches played behind closed doors.

=== Liguilla ===
The eight best teams play two games against each other on a home-and-away basis. The higher seeded teams play on their home field during the second leg. The winner of each match up is determined by aggregate score. In the quarterfinals and semifinals, if the two teams are tied on aggregate, the higher seeded team advances. In the final, if the two teams are tied after both legs, the match goes to a penalty shoot-out.

Quarter-finals
2	Monterrey	1	4	5
7	Pachuca	2	0	2
3	UANL	4	5	9
6	Toluca	0	0	0
1	Guadalajara	1	1	2
8	Cruz Azul	0	1	1
4	América	1	2	3
5	Tijuana	0	0	0

Semi-finals
2	Monterrey	1	2	3
3	UANL	2	2	4
1	Guadalajara	1	3	4
4	América	3	3	6

Final
3	UANL	1	2	3
4	América	0	0	0

==== Quarter-finals ====
The first legs were played on 27 and 28 October, and the second legs were played on 30 and 31 October 2022.

Team 1	Agg.	Team 2	1st leg	2nd leg
Guadalajara	2–1	Cruz Azul	1–0	1–1
Monterrey	5–2	Pachuca	1–2	4–0
UANL	9–0	Toluca	4–0	5–0
América	3–0	Tijuana	1–0	2–0

First leg

27 October 2022	Cruz Azul	0–1	Guadalajara	Coyoacán, Mexico City
16:00 CDT (UTC−5)		Report	Cervantes 88'	Stadium: Estadio Azteca; Attendance: 6,409; Referee: Karen Hernández Andrade (Aguascalientes)

28 October 2022	Pachuca	2–1	Monterrey	Pachuca, Hidalgo
17:05 CDT (UTC−5)	Alvarado 75'; Hermoso 90'	Report	Evangelista 66'	Stadium: Estadio Hidalgo; Attendance: 1,593; Referee: Priscila Eritzel Pérez Borja (Guanajuato)

28 October 2022	Toluca	0–4	UANL	Toluca, State of Mexico
19:00 CDT (UTC−5)		Report	Mercado 3'; Ovalle 33'; Fishel 36'; Mayor 66'	Stadium: Estadio Nemesio Díez; Attendance: 2,457; Referee: Diana Stephanía Pérez Borja (Guanajuato)

28 October 2022	Tijuana	0–1	América	Tijuana, Baja California
19:06 PDT (UTC−7); 21:06 CDT (UTC−5)		Report	Palacios 15'	Stadium: Estadio Caliente; Attendance: 4,733; Referee: Lizzet Amairany García Olvera (Michoacán)

Second leg

30 October 2022	Guadalajara	1–1 (2–1 agg.)	Cruz Azul	Zapopan, Jalisco
16:40 CST (UTC−6)	Jaramillo 33'	Report	Becerra 90'	Stadium: Estadio Akron; Attendance: 10,709; Referee: Miguel Ángel Anaya Suárez (Michoacán)

31 October 2022	América	2–0 (3–0 agg.)	Tijuana	Coyoacán, Mexico City
17:00 CST (UTC−6)	Camberos 3'; González 54'	Report		Stadium: Estadio Azteca; Attendance: 5,998; Referee: Francia María González Martínez (Guanajuato)

31 October 2022	UANL	5–0 (9–0 agg.)	Toluca	San Nicolás de los Garza, Nuevo León
19:00 CST (UTC−6)	Fishel 25'; Mercado 30'; Cruz 47'; Mayor 66'; Ovalle 77'	Report		Stadium: Estadio Universitario; Attendance: 4,479; Referee: Martín Molina Astorga (Nuevo León)

31 October 2022	Monterrey	4–0 (5–2 agg.)	Pachuca	Guadalupe, Nuevo León
21:00 CST (UTC−6)	Burkenroad 45'; Bernal 54'; Avilez 56'; Franco 68'	Report		Stadium: Estadio BBVA; Attendance: 4,533; Referee: Edgar Ulises Rangel Araujo (Mexico City)

==== Semi-finals ====
The first legs were played on 4 November, and the second legs were played on 7 November 2022.

Team 1	Agg.	Team 2	1st leg	2nd leg
Guadalajara	4–6	América	1–3	3–3
Monterrey	3–4	UANL	1–2	2–2

First leg

4 November 2022	América	3–1	Guadalajara	Coyoacán, Mexico City
18:00 CST (UTC−6)	Cuevas 33'; Camberos 58'; N. Hernández 67'	Report	J. Rodríguez 90+1'	Stadium: Estadio Azteca; Attendance: 30,274; Referee: Francia María González Martínez (Guanajuato)

4 November 2022	UANL	2–1	Monterrey	San Nicolás de los Garza, Nuevo León
20:06 CST (UTC−6)	Mayor 4', 42'	Report	Bernal 68'	Stadium: Estadio Universitario; Attendance: 36,509; Referee: Karen Hernández Andrade (Aguascalientes)

Second leg

7 November 2022	Guadalajara	3-3 (4–6 agg.)	América	Zapopan, Jalisco
19:00 CST (UTC−6)	Iturbide 67'; Valenzuela 81'; Cervantes 85'	Report	Pereira 4'; González 62'; Palacios 90'	Stadium: Estadio Akron; Attendance: 25,899; Referee: Diana Stephanía Pérez Borja (Guanajuato)

7 November 2022	Monterrey	2–2 (3–4 agg.)	UANL	Guadalupe, Nuevo León
21:06 CST (UTC−6)	Bernal 4'; Salas 80'	Report	Fishel 37'; Ovalle 77'	Stadium: Estadio BBVA; Attendance: 42,315; Referee: Katia Itzel García Mendoza (Mexico City)

==== Final ====
The first leg was played on 11 November, and the second leg was played on 14 November 2022.

Team 1	Agg.	Team 2	1st leg	2nd leg
UANL	3–0	América	1–0	2–0

First leg

11 November 2022	América	0–1	UANL	Coyoacán, Mexico City
20:00 CST (UTC−6)		Report	Ovalle 47'	Stadium: Estadio Azteca; Attendance: 52,654; Referee: Francia María González Martínez (Guanajuato)

Second leg

14 November 2022	UANL	2–0 (3–0 agg.)	América	San Nicolás de los Garza, Nuevo León
20:00 CST (UTC−6)	Ovalle 21'; Cruz 49'	Report		Stadium: Estadio Universitario; Attendance: 41,615; Referee: Katia Itzel García Mendoza (Mexico City)

Apertura 2022 winners

5th title

== Torneo Clausura ==
The Torneo Clausura 2023 is the second tournament of the season. The tournament began on 6 January 2023.

=== Regular season ===
==== Standings ====
Pos	Team	Pld	W	D	L	GF	GA	GD	Pts	Qualification or relegation
1	Monterrey	17	12	3	2	46	15	+31	39	Advance to Liguilla (Note: The first 8 places in the table qualify for the Liguilla.)
2	UANL	17	12	2	3	48	13	+35	38	Advance to Liguilla
3	América (C)	17	11	4	2	51	14	+37	37	Advance to Liguilla
4	Guadalajara	17	11	4	2	40	15	+25	37	Advance to Liguilla
5	Pachuca	17	11	3	3	54	24	+30	36	Advance to Liguilla
6	Juárez	17	8	4	5	30	19	+11	28	Advance to Liguilla
7	Atlas	17	8	4	5	28	33	−5	28	Advance to Liguilla
8	Tijuana	17	7	5	5	23	29	−6	26	Advance to Liguilla
9	UNAM	17	6	7	4	28	20	+8	25	
10	Toluca	17	7	4	6	23	26	−3	25	
11	León	17	5	4	8	20	30	−10	19	
12	Querétaro	17	4	6	7	11	16	−5	18	
13	Atlético San Luis	17	5	2	10	22	35	−13	17	
14	Santos Laguna	17	4	5	8	19	36	−17	17	
15	Cruz Azul	17	2	7	8	14	23	−9	13	
16	Puebla	17	3	3	11	14	34	−20	12	
17	Necaxa	17	2	0	15	9	44	−35	6	
18	Mazatlán	17	1	1	15	6	60	−54	4	

Updated to match(es) played on 15 May 2023. Source: Liga MX Femenil
Rules for classification: 1) Points; 2) Goal difference; 3) Number of goals scored; 4) Head-to-head results between tied teams; 5) Number of goals scored away; 6) Highest relegation coefficient; 7) Fair Play points
(C) Champions

==== Positions by Round ====
Qualification to quarter-finals
Last place in table

Team ╲ Round	1	2	3	4	5	6	7	8	9	10	11	12	13	14	15	16	17
Monterrey	4	5	1	1	2	1	1	1	1	1	1	1	2	2	2	2	1
UANL	2	2	2	2	1	4	6	5	5	5	5	5	5	4	4	3	2
América	9	6	5	4	3	6	4	3	3	3	2	3	3	3	5	4	3
Guadalajara	3	4	4	3	4	2	2	2	2	2	3	2	1	1	1	1	4
Pachuca	8	1	6	6	5	3	3	4	4	4	4	4	4	5	3	5	5
Juárez	1	3	3	5	6	5	5	6	6	6	6	6	7	6	8	7	6
Atlas	17	11	7	10	10	10	7	8	8	8	8	8	8	8	6	6	7
Tijuana	7	7	9	8	8	7	8	7	7	7	7	7	6	7	7	9	8
UNAM	16	15	12	13	12	13	12	12	11	11	12	13	13	11	10	10	9
Toluca	12	16	16	15	17	17	15	15	16	14	11	9	9	9	9	8	10
León	6	9	13	14	14	14	14	16	14	15	14	11	12	12	13	11	11
Querétaro	11	13	11	12	11	11	11	11	12	12	13	14	10	13	12	14	12
Atlético San Luis	13	10	14	9	9	8	10	10	9	10	9	10	11	10	11	13	13
Santos Laguna	5	8	10	11	13	12	13	13	13	13	15	15	15	14	14	12	14
Cruz Azul	10	12	8	7	7	9	9	9	10	9	10	12	14	15	15	15	15
Puebla	15	17	17	17	15	15	16	14	15	16	16	16	16	16	16	16	16
Necaxa	14	14	15	16	18	18	18	18	18	18	18	18	18	18	17	17	17
Mazatlán	18	18	18	18	16	16	17	17	17	17	17	17	17	17	18	18	18

Updated to match(es) played on 15 May 2023. Source: Liga MX Femenil

==== Results ====
Each team plays once all other teams in 17 rounds regardless of it being a home or away match.

Home \ Away	AME	ATL	ASL	CAZ	GUA	JUA	LEO	MAZ	MON	NEC	PAC	PUE	QUE	SAN	TIJ	TOL	UNL	UNM
América	—	5–0	3–0	—	2–0	—	2–0	6–1	—	—	—	7–0	2–1	—	5–0	—	—	—
Atlas	—	—	—	1–0	—	1–2	2–2	—	3–2	4–1	1–1	—	1–0	—	—	—	—	1–1
Atlético San Luis	—	5–1	—	—	—	—	3–1	4–1	—	1–0	—	2–1	—	—	0–0	1–1	—	1–3
Cruz Azul	1–1	—	3–0	—	0–2	1–1	2–2	—	0–3	—	—	—	1–1	—	—	0–1	—	1–1
Guadalajara	—	2–1	4–0	—	—	2–1	3–0	—	2–2	—	4–4	2–1	—	—	—	—	—	5–1
Juárez	3–3	—	3–2	—	—	—	—	7–0	0–2	—	2–0	2–0	—	—	—	1–1	3–1	—
León	—	—	—	—	—	1–0	—	—	0–1	2–0	0–3	3–1	—	1–1	2–1	—	—	0–3
Mazatlán	—	0–2	—	1–3	0–6	—	0–3	—	—	0–1	—	—	0–2	1–1	—	—	—	0–6
Monterrey	2–0	—	4–2	—	—	—	—	9–0	—	3–0	5–0	—	1–0	2–1	5–2	—	1–1	—
Necaxa	0–6	—	—	1–0	1–4	0–1	—	—	—	—	—	—	0–1	—	2–3	1–4	1–4	—
Pachuca	2–3	—	4–0	3–0	—	—	—	2–0	—	5–1	—	—	—	6–0	7–2	10–2	2–1	—
Puebla	—	1–3	—	2–0	—	—	—	1–0	0–2	2–0	1–1	—	1–1	—	—	0–2	0–2	—
Querétaro	—	—	1–0	—	0–1	0–1	2–2	—	—	—	0–1	—	—	0–0	—	—	0–4	0–0
Santos Laguna	1–1	1–2	2–0	1–1	1–2	3–2	—	—	—	3–0	—	2–1	—	—	—	0–2	—	—
Tijuana	—	1–1	—	1–1	1–0	1–1	—	0–1	—	—	—	4–1	1–1	2–1	—	—	2–0	—
Toluca	1–4	3–4	—	—	0–0	—	2–0	2–1	2–0	—	—	—	0–1	—	0–1	—	—	0–0
UANL	1–0	6–0	3–1	1–0	1–1	—	4–1	5–0	—	—	—	—	—	9–0	—	2–0	—	—
UNAM	1–1	—	—	—	—	1–0	—	—	2–2	1–0	2–3	1–1	—	4–1	0–1	—	1–3	—

Updated to match(es) played on 15 May 2023. Source: Liga MX Femenil
Legend: Blue = home team win; Yellow = draw; Red = away team win.

=== Regular season statistics ===
==== Top goalscorers ====
Players sorted first by goals scored, then by last name.

Rank	Player	Club	Goals
1	(Mexico) Charlyn Corral	Pachuca	20
2	(Spain) Jennifer Hermoso	Pachuca	18
3	(Mexico) Christina Burkenroad	Monterrey	15
4	(United States) Mia Fishel	UANL	13
4	(Mexico) Kiana Palacios	América	13
6	(Mexico) Alicia Cervantes	Guadalajara	10
7	(Mexico) Natalia Mauleón	América	9
7	(Mexico) Lizbeth Ovalle	UANL	9
9	(Mexico) Renae Cuéllar	Tijuana	8
10	(Mexico) Jasmine Casarez	Juárez	7
10	(Mexico) Daniela Espinosa	Tijuana	7
10	(Mexico) Kimberli Gómez	UNAM	7
10	(Mexico) Carolina Jaramillo	Guadalajara	7
10	(Mexico) Stephany Mayor	UANL	7
10	(Mexico) Alexia Villanueva	Santos Laguna	7

Source: Liga MX Femenil

==== Hat-tricks ====
Player	For	Against	Result	Date	Round	Ref
(Mexico) Alicia Cervantes	Guadalajara	UNAM	5 – 1 (H)	6 January 2023	1	
(Nigeria) Uchenna Kanu	UANL	Atlas	6 – 0 (H)	9 January 2023	1	
(Mexico) Charlyn Corral	Pachuca	Toluca	10 – 2 (H)	16 January 2022	2	
(Mexico) Christina Burkenroad	Monterrey	Mazatlán	9 – 0 (H)	23 January 2023	3	
(Mexico) Renae Cuéllar	Tijuana	Puebla	4 – 1 (H)	29 January 2023	4	
(Mexico) Kiana Palacios	América	Necaxa	0 – 6 (A)	30 January 2023	4	
(Mexico) Charlyn Corral	Pachuca	Santos Laguna	6 – 0 (H)	6 February 2023	5	
(Mexico) Katty Martínez	América	Atlas	5 – 0 (H)	13 March 2023	9	
(Mexico) Christina Burkenroad	Monterrey	Pachuca	5 – 0 (H)	13 March 2023	9	
(Mexico) Charlyn Corral	Pachuca	Tijuana	7 – 2 (H)	25 March 2023	11	
(Mexico) Charlyn Corral	Pachuca	Necaxa	5 – 1 (H)	17 April 2023	13	
(Mexico) Kimberli Gómez	UNAM	Mazatlán	0 – 6 (A)	24 April 2023	14	
(Mexico) Christina Burkenroad	Monterrey	Tijuana	5 – 2 (H)	24 April 2023	14	
(Mexico) Stephany Mayor	UANL	Santos Laguna	9 – 0 (H)	12 May 2023	17	

(H) – Home; (A) – Away

=== Attendance ===
==== Per team ====
Pos	Team	Total	High	Low	Average	Change
1	Monterrey	66,637	30,877	1,256	7,404	+124.0%
2	Guadalajara	54,025	22,000	148	6,759	+10.5%
3	UANL	60,464	13,469	2,846	6,718	−23.2%
4	América	32,205	18,900	516	4,026	+138.1%
5	Pachuca	26,246	5,690	1,451	2,916	+45.8%
6	Juárez	23,103	5,154	1,302	2,888	+227.8%
7	Toluca	19,740	5,401	873	2,193	+54.1%
8	Tijuana	14,697	4,333	833	1,633	−10.3%
9	UNAM	13,551	3,129	607	1,506	−15.0%
10	Necaxa	11,808	3,182	571	1,476	+121.0%
11	Querétaro	5,854	2,496	833	1,464	n/a^{1}
12	Atlético San Luis	9,282	1,341	744	1,160	−6.9%
13	Santos Laguna	9,560	2,160	325	1,062	+159.7%
14	Puebla	6,915	2,142	288	768	−34.9%
15	León	4,480	996	295	560	−49.0%
16	Atlas	4,277	898	313	535	−39.5%
17	Mazatlán	2,729	1,141	200	390	−59.4%^{2}
18	Cruz Azul	1,746	275	145	194	+19.0%
	League total	367,442	30,877	145	2,483	+23.8%

Source: Liga MX
Notes:
Only regular season listed
1: As a result of the riot on 5 March 2022, Querétaro played four matches behind closed doors. The ban finished on 5 March 2023.
2: Mazatlán played its match against Atlas behind closed doors.

==== Highest and lowest ====
Highest attended					Lowest attended			
Week	Home	Score	Away	Attendance	Home	Score	Away	Attendance
1	UANL	6–0	Atlas	6,815	Cruz Azul	1–1	América	206
2	Monterrey	2–1	Santos Laguna	3,955	Tijuana	1–1	Cruz Azul	833
3	América	5–0	Tijuana	3,589	Cruz Azul	3–0	Atlético San Luis	179
4	UANL	2–0	Toluca	4,395	Mazatlán	1–3	Cruz Azul	200
5	UANL	3–1	Atlético San Luis	13,469	Cruz Azul	1–1	UNAM	275
6	Juárez	3–1	UANL	4,002	Guadalajara	2–1	Puebla	148
7	Pachuca	2–1	UANL	4,535	América	3–0	Atlético San Luis	516
8	Guadalajara	2–1	Atlas	22,000	Cruz Azul	1–1	Querétaro	170
9	Monterrey	5–0	Pachuca	4,054	Mazatlán	1–1	Santos Laguna	286
10	UANL	1–0	América	9,805	Cruz Azul	2–2	León	148
11	Monterrey	1–1	UANL	30,877	Cruz Azul	1–1	Juárez	201
12	Juárez	3–3	América	5,154	Mazatlán	0–3	León	305
13	UANL	5–0	Mazatlán	4,488	Tijuana	3–2	Juárez	668
14	América	2–1	Querétaro	2,809	Mazatlán	0–6	UNAM	227
15	Monterrey	2–0	América	12,254	Mazatlán	0–1	Necaxa	282
16	Guadalajara	4–4	Pachuca	7,955	Cruz Azul	0–1	Toluca	145
17	Toluca	1–4	América	4,641	Mazatlán	0–2	Querétaro	288

Source: Liga MX

1. Does not include matches played behind closed doors.

=== Liguilla ===
The eight best teams play two games against each other on a home-and-away basis. The higher seeded teams play on their home field during the second leg. The winner of each match up is determined by aggregate score. In the quarterfinals and semifinals, if the two teams are tied on aggregate, the higher seeded team advances. In the final, if the two teams are tied after both legs, the match goes to a penalty shoot-out.

Quarter-finals
2	UANL	5	2	7
7	Atlas	0	0	0
3	América	3	5	8
6	Juárez	1	1	2
1	Monterrey	0	6	6
8	Tijuana	2	1	3
4	Guadalajara	3	1	4
5	Pachuca	3	3	6

Semi-finals
2	UANL	0	0	0
3	América	1	1	2
1	Monterrey	0	0	0
5	Pachuca	0	1	1

Final
3	América	2	2	4
5	Pachuca	1	1	2

==== Quarter-finals ====
The first legs were played on 18 and 19 May, and the second legs were played on 21 and 22 May 2023.

Team 1	Agg.	Team 2	1st leg	2nd leg
Monterrey	6–3	Tijuana	0–2	6–1
UANL	7–0	Atlas	5–0	2–0
América	8–2	Juárez	3–1	5–1
Guadalajara	4–6	Pachuca	3–3	1–3

First leg

18 May 2023	Pachuca	3–3	Guadalajara	Pachuca, Hidalgo
18:00 CST (UTC−6)	Soto 19'; Hermoso 42' (pen.); Hermoso 90'	Report	Godínez 1'; Valenzuela 5'; Jaramillo 90+2'	Stadium: Estadio Hidalgo; Attendance: 7,558; Referee: Katia Itzel García Mendoza (Mexico City)

19 May 2023	Atlas	0–5	UANL	Guadalajara, Jalisco
18:00 CST (UTC−6)		Report	Cruz 2'; Ovalle 16', 38', 56'; Reyes 89'	Stadium: Estadio Jalisco; Attendance: 1,078; Referee: Lizzet Amairany García Olvera (Michoacán)

19 May 2023	Juárez	1–3	América	Ciudad Juárez, Chihuahua
20:00 CST (UTC−6)	Hernández 70'	Report	González 8'; Palacios 39'; Orejel 90'	Stadium: Estadio Olímpico Benito Juárez; Attendance: 11,628; Referee: Priscila Eritzel Pérez Borja (Guanajuato)

19 May 2023	Tijuana	2–0	Monterrey	Tijuana, Baja California
21:00 PDT (UTC−7); 22:00 CST (UTC−6)	Hix 25'; Willett 43'	Report		Stadium: Estadio Caliente; Attendance: 4,133; Referee: Martín Molina Astorga (Nuevo León)

Second leg

21 May 2023	Guadalajara	1–3 (4–6 agg.)	Pachuca	Guadalajara, Jalisco
17:00 CST (UTC−6)	Montoya 49'	Report	Rodríguez 42' (own); Hermoso 57'; Salazar 59'	Stadium: Estadio Jalisco; Attendance: 8,449; Referee: Diana Stephanía Pérez Borja (Guanajuato)

22 May 2023	América	5–1 (8–2 agg.)	Juárez	Coyoacán, Mexico City
17:00 CST (UTC−6)	Palacios 31'; González 35', 69'; Pereira 88'; Falcón 90+3'	Report	Casarez 49'	Stadium: Estadio Azteca; Attendance: 2,205; Referee: Salvador Pérez Villalobos (Mexico City)

22 May 2023	UANL	2–0 (7–0 agg.)	Atlas	San Nicolás de los Garza, Nuevo León
19:00 CST (UTC−6)	Mercado 83'; Mayor 87'	Report		Stadium: Estadio Universitario; Attendance: 6,221; Referee: Yonatan Peinado Aguirre (Chihuahua)

22 May 2023	Monterrey	6–1 (6–3 agg.)	Tijuana	Guadalupe, Nuevo León
21:00 CST (UTC−6)	Solís 45+4', 90'; Bernal 69' (pen.); Monsiváis 80', 85'; Avilez 90+2'	Report	Alvarado 32'	Stadium: Estadio BBVA; Attendance: 5,039; Referee: Karen Hernández Andrade (Aguascalientes)

==== Semi-finals ====
The first legs were played on 26 May, and the second legs were played on 29 May 2023.

Team 1	Agg.	Team 2	1st leg	2nd leg
Monterrey	0–1	Pachuca	0–0	0–1
UANL	0–2	América	0–1	0–1

First leg

26 May 2023	América	1–0	UANL	Coyoacán, Mexico City
19:00 CST (UTC−6)	González 32'	Report		Stadium: Estadio Azteca; Attendance: 10,659; Referee: Diana Stephanía Pérez Borja (Guanajuato)

26 May 2023	Pachuca	0–0	Monterrey	Pachuca, Hidalgo
21:00 CST (UTC−6)		Report		Stadium: Estadio Hidalgo; Attendance: 11,759; Referee: Priscila Eritzel Pérez Borja (Guanajuato)

Second leg

29 May 2023	UANL	0–1 (0–2 agg.)	América	San Nicolás de los Garza, Nuevo León
19:00 CST (UTC−6)		Report	Cuevas 71'	Stadium: Estadio Universitario; Attendance: 16,464; Referee: Martín Molina Astorga (Nuevo León)

29 May 2023	Monterrey	0–1 (0–1 agg.)	Pachuca	Guadalupe, Nuevo León
21:00 CST (UTC−6)		Report	Salazar 82'	Stadium: Estadio BBVA; Attendance: 13,280; Referee: Salvador Pérez Villalobos (Mexico City)

==== Final ====
The first leg will be played on 2 June, and the second leg will be played on 5 June 2023.

Team 1	Agg.	Team 2	1st leg	2nd leg
América	4–2	Pachuca	2–1	2–1

First leg

2 June 2023	Pachuca	1–2	América	Pachuca, Hidalgo
20:00 CST (UTC−6)	Corral 18'	Report	Pereira 67' (pen.); Martínez 71'	Stadium: Estadio Hidalgo; Attendance: 20,832; Referee: Katia Itzel García Mendoza (Mexico City)

Second leg

5 June 2023	América	2–1 (4–2 agg.)	Pachuca	Coyoacán, Mexico City
20:00 CST (UTC−6)	Martínez 7'; Kaci 57'	Report	Soto 85'	Stadium: Estadio Azteca; Attendance: 58,156; Referee: Diana Stephanía Pérez Borja (Guanajuato)

Clausura 2023 winners

2nd title

== Aggregate table ==
The aggregate table (the sum of points of both the Apertura 2022 and Clausura 2023 tournaments) will be used to determine seeds in the Campeón de Campeones.

Pos	Team	Pld	W	D	L	GF	GA	GD	Pts	Qualification or relegation
1	Monterrey	34	25	6	3	92	31	+61	81	
2	Guadalajara	34	25	5	4	76	26	+50	80	
3	UANL (C, A)	34	24	4	6	96	26	+70	76	Campeón de Campeones (Note: As Apertura 2022 champions)
4	América (X)	34	22	7	5	88	30	+58	73	Campeón de Campeones (Note: As Clausura 2023 champions)
5	Pachuca	34	19	4	11	89	49	+40	61	
6	Tijuana	34	15	10	9	57	53	+4	55	
7	Atlas	34	14	9	11	53	58	−5	51	
8	Toluca	34	15	6	13	50	55	−5	51	
9	Juárez	34	15	5	14	54	47	+7	50	
10	UNAM	34	13	10	11	58	56	+2	49	
11	León	34	11	7	16	42	56	−14	40	
12	Cruz Azul	34	9	11	14	30	39	−9	38	
13	Atlético San Luis	34	12	2	20	45	71	−26	38	
14	Santos Laguna	34	10	6	18	43	72	−29	36	
15	Querétaro	34	7	9	18	27	47	−20	30	
16	Puebla	34	6	5	23	34	72	−38	23	
17	Mazatlán	34	4	3	27	21	109	−88	15	
18	Necaxa	34	3	5	26	21	79	−58	14	

Updated to match(es) played on 15 May 2023. Source: Liga MX Femenil
Rules for classification: 1) Points; 2) Goal difference; 3) Number of goals scored; 4) Head-to-head results between tied teams; 5) Number of goals scored away; 6) Highest relegation coefficient; 7) Fair Play points
(A) Apertura champion; (C) Champions; (X) Clausura champion

== Campeón de Campeonas ==
On May 24, 2021, the Liga MX Owners Assembly made official the creation of the Campeón de Campeonas ("Champion of Women's Champions"), a tournament between the two winning teams of the season's tournaments made with the goal of premiering the best team in all the annual cycle of Mexican women's football.

The first leg was played on 7 July 2023 and the second leg was played on 10 July 2023.

Team 1	Agg.	Team 2	1st leg	2nd leg
UANL	3–0	América	2–0	1–0

First leg

7 July 2023	América	0–2	UANL	Coyoacán, Mexico City
20:00 CST (UTC−6)		Report	Fishel 69', 89'	Stadium: Estadio Azteca; Attendance: 7,557; Referee: Karen Hernández Andrade (Aguascalientes)

Second leg

10 July 2023	UANL	1–0 (3–0 agg.)	América	San Nicolás de los Garza, Nuevo León
20:00 CST (UTC−6)	Ovalle 24'	Report		Stadium: Estadio Universitario; Attendance: 17,858; Referee: Priscila Eritzel Pérez Borja (Guanajuato)

2022–23 winners

2nd title
