= 2024–25 Liga MX Femenil season =

Mexican women's football league season

Liga MX Femenil
- Season: 2024–25
- Champions: Apertura: Monterrey (4th title); Clausura: Pachuca (1st title)
- Matches: 306
- Goals: 970 (3.17 per match)
- Top goalscorer: Apertura: Charlyn Corral (18 goals); Clausura: Charlyn Corral (21 goals)
- Biggest home win: Apertura: Pachuca 7–0 Mazatlán (1 September 2024); América 7–0 Guadalajara (15 September 2024); Clausura: América 7–0 Querétaro (10 January 2025); América 7–0 Puebla (12 March 2025); UANL 7–0 Mazatlán (17 March 2025)
- Biggest away win: Apertura: Mazatlán 1–8 América (8 September 2024); Clausura: Mazatlán 0–8 Guadalajara (2 February 2025)
- Highest scoring: Apertura: Mazatlán 1–8 América (8 September 2024); Clausura: Querétaro 1–7 Pachuca (6 January 2025); Mazatlán 0–8 Guadalajara (2 February 2025)
- Longest winning run: Apertura: 9 matches UANL; Clausura: 7 matches Pachuca
- Longest unbeaten run: Apertura: 14 matches Pachuca; Clausura: 14 matches Pachuca
- Longest winless run: Apertura: 10 matches Santos Laguna; Clausura: 15 matches Santos Laguna
- Longest losing run: Apertura: 8 matches Santos Laguna; Clausura: 15 matches Santos Laguna
- Highest attendance: Apertura: 14,978; Monterrey vs. Cruz Azul (8 September 2024); Clausura: 21,748; Monterrey vs. UANL (14 February 2025)
- Lowest attendance: Apertura: 86; Puebla vs. Querétaro (30 September 2024); Clausura: 106; Mazatlán vs. Puebla (2 March 2025)
- Total attendance: Apertura: 283,141; Clausura: 316,205
- Average attendance: Apertura: 1,875; Clausura: 2,067
- Stats are from the regular phase only. Source: Liga MX Femenil

The 2024–25 Liga MX Femenil season was the eighth season of the premier women's football league in Mexico. The season began on 4 July 2024 and finished on 12 May 2025.

== Stadiums and locations ==
América	Atlas	Atlético San Luis	Cruz Azul	Guadalajara
Estadio Ciudad de los Deportes	Estadio Jalisco	Estadio Alfonso Lastras	Instalaciones La Noria	Estadio Akron
Capacity: 33,000	Capacity: 55,110	Capacity: 25,111	Capacity: 2,000	Capacity: 46,232
Juárez	León	Mazatlán	Monterrey	Necaxa
Estadio Olímpico Benito Juárez	Estadio León	Estadio El Encanto	Estadio BBVA	Estadio Victoria
Capacity: 19,703	Capacity: 31,297	Capacity: 25,000	Capacity: 51,348	Capacity: 23,851
Pachuca	Puebla	Querétaro	Santos Laguna	Tijuana
Estadio Hidalgo	Estadio Cuauhtémoc	Estadio Corregidora	Estadio Corona	Estadio Caliente
Capacity: 27,512	Capacity: 51,726	Capacity: 33,162	Capacity: 29,237	Capacity: 27,333
Toluca	UANL	UNAM		
Estadio Nemesio Díez	Estadio Universitario	Estadio Olímpico Universitario		
Capacity: 31,000	Capacity: 41,886	Capacity: 48,297		

== Alternate venues ==
- América – Cancha Centenario No. 5 (Capacity: 1,000)
- Atlas – CECAF (Capacity: 1,000)
- Guadalajara – Verde Valle (Capacity: 800)
- León – La Esmeralda Cancha Sintética (Capacity: 1,000)
- Mazatlán – Centro Deportivo Benito Juárez (Capacity: 1,000)
- Monterrey – El Barrial (Capacity: 570)
- Necaxa – Instalaciones Club Necaxa (Capacity: 1,000)
- Querétaro - Estadio Olímpico Alameda (Capacity: 4,600)
- Toluca – Instalaciones Metepec (Capacity: 1,000)
- UANL – Instalaciones Zuazua (Capacity: 800)
- UNAM – La Cantera (Capacity: 2,000)
Location of the 2024–25 Liga MX Femenil teams
Location of the 2024–25 Liga MX Femenil teams in Greater Mexico City

== Personnel and kits ==
Team	Chairman	Head coach	Kit manufacturer	Shirt sponsor(s)
América	Santiago Baños	(Spain) Ángel Villacampa	Nike	Caliente
Atlas	José Riestra	(Mexico) Roberto Medina	Charly	Caliente
Atlético San Luis	Jacobo Payán Espinosa	(Mexico) Ignacio Quintana	Sporelli	Canel's
Cruz Azul	Víctor Velázquez	(Uruguay) Diego Testas	Pirma	Cemento Cruz Azul
Guadalajara	Amaury Vergara	(Spain) Antonio Contreras	Puma	Sello Rojo
Juárez	Andrés Fassi	(Spain) Óscar Fernández	Sporelli	
León	Jesús Martínez Murguia	(Mexico) Alejandro Corona	Charly	Cementos Fortaleza, Telcel
Mazatlán	Mauricio Lanz González	(Mexico) Roberto Pérez	Pirma	Banco Azteca
Monterrey	José Antonio Noriega	(Costa Rica) Amelia Valverde	Puma	BBVA, Kotex, Tim Hortons
Necaxa	Ernesto Tinajero Flores	(Mexico) Lupita Worbis	Pirma	Rolcar, Playdoit, JR Romo
Pachuca	Armando Martínez Patiño	(Mexico) Oscar Fernando Torres	Charly	Cementos Fortaleza, Saba, JAC Motors, Telcel
Puebla	Manuel Jiménez García	(Mexico) Carlos Adrián Morales	Pirma	Banco Azteca
Querétaro	Juan Olvera	(Mexico) Fernando Samayoa	Keuka	Pedigree Petfoods
Santos Laguna	Aleco Irarragorri Kalb	(Mexico) Jhonathan Lazcano	Charly	Peñoles, Soriana
Tijuana	Jorge Hank Inzunsa	(Mexico) Juan Manuel Romo	Charly	Caliente
Toluca	Arturo Pérez Arredondo	(Mexico) César Arzate (Interim)	New Balance	Arabela
UANL	Mauricio Culebro	(Spain) Pedro Martínez Losa	Adidas	Cemex
UNAM	Luis Raúl González	(Brazil) Marcello Frigério	Nike	DHL Express, Mifel

== Format ==
- The Liga MX Femenil season is split into two championships: the Torneo Apertura 2024 (opening tournament) and the Torneo Clausura 2025 (closing tournament). Each is contested in an identical format and includes the same eighteen teams.
- Since 2019–20 season the teams compete in a single group, the best eight of the general table qualify to the championship playoffs.

== Torneo Apertura ==
The Torneo Apertura 2024 is the first tournament of the season. The tournament began on 4 July 2024.

=== Regular season ===
==== Standings ====
Pos	Team	Pld	W	D	L	GF	GA	GD	Pts	Qualification or relegation
1	Monterrey (C)	17	13	3	1	41	11	+30	42	Advance to Liguilla (Note: The first 8 places in the table qualify for the Liguilla.)
2	UANL	17	13	2	2	41	12	+29	41	Advance to Liguilla
3	América	17	12	4	1	55	11	+44	40	Advance to Liguilla
4	Pachuca	17	11	4	2	42	16	+26	37	Advance to Liguilla
5	Juárez	17	10	2	5	32	14	+18	32	Advance to Liguilla
6	Guadalajara	17	9	3	5	34	25	+9	30	Advance to Liguilla
7	UNAM	17	9	2	6	33	31	+2	29	Advance to Liguilla
8	Toluca	17	8	2	7	31	30	+1	26	Advance to Liguilla
9	Tijuana	17	8	1	8	36	31	+5	25	
10	Querétaro	17	7	4	6	20	23	−3	25	
11	Atlas	17	7	4	6	23	27	−4	25	
12	Cruz Azul	17	6	2	9	25	27	−2	20	
13	León	17	5	4	8	14	23	−9	19	
14	Atlético San Luis	17	2	4	11	15	41	−26	10	
15	Mazatlán	17	3	1	13	14	55	−41	10	
16	Puebla	17	2	3	12	13	29	−16	9	
17	Santos Laguna	17	2	2	13	11	38	−27	8	
18	Necaxa	17	2	1	14	8	44	−36	7	

Updated to match(es) played on 3 November 2024. Source: Liga MX Femenil
Rules for classification: 1) Points; 2) Goal difference; 3) Number of goals scored; 4) Head-to-head results between tied teams; 5) Number of goals scored away; 6) Highest relegation coefficient; 7) Fair Play points
(C) Champions

==== Positions by round ====
Qualification to quarter-finals
Last place in table

Team ╲ Round	1	2	3	4	5	6	7	8	9	10	11	12	13	14	15	16	17
Monterrey	7	2	4	3	2	2	2	3	3	3	3	3	3	3	3	1	1
UANL	2	4	5	5	4	3	4	2	1	2	1	1	2	2	1	2	2
América	10	13	13	10	7	8	7	8	6	4	4	4	4	4	4	3	3
Pachuca	1	1	3	2	1	1	1	1	2	1	2	2	1	1	2	4	4
Juárez	14	14	17	13	10	12	11	11	10	10	10	7	6	5	6	5	5
Guadalajara	6	9	11	7	8	5	3	4	4	5	6	8	8	7	5	7	6
UNAM	4	5	1	1	3	4	5	5	5	6	5	5	5	6	7	6	7
Toluca	3	8	7	11	14	14	14	13	13	13	12	11	11	12	11	11	8
Tijuana	11	7	10	6	5	7	6	6	7	7	7	9	10	10	8	8	9
Querétaro	9	10	8	12	13	11	8	10	8	8	8	10	9	9	10	10	10
Atlas	15	17	16	15	12	10	9	7	9	9	9	6	7	8	9	9	11
Cruz Azul	5	3	2	4	9	6	10	9	11	11	11	12	13	11	12	12	12
León	16	11	9	9	6	9	12	12	12	12	13	13	12	13	13	13	13
Atlético San Luis	8	6	6	8	11	13	13	14	14	15	14	14	14	14	14	14	14
Mazatlán	12	16	18	18	18	15	15	17	17	17	16	16	16	15	15	15	15
Puebla	13	15	15	17	16	17	17	16	16	14	15	15	15	16	16	16	16
Santos Laguna	17	12	14	16	17	18	18	18	18	18	17	17	17	17	17	17	17
Necaxa	18	18	12	14	15	16	16	15	15	16	18	18	18	18	18	18	18

Updated to match(es) played on 3 November 2024. Source: Liga MX Femenil

==== Results ====
Each team plays once all other teams in 17 rounds regardless of it being a home or away match.

Home \ Away	AME	ATL	ASL	CAZ	GUA	JUA	LEO	MAZ	MON	NEC	PAC	PUE	QUE	SAN	TIJ	TOL	UNL	UNM
América	—	4–1	—	—	7–0	0–0	—	—	—	4–0	5–0	—	—	2–0	—	2–2	—	2–2
Atlas	—	—	3–0	—	1–5	1–0	0–0	—	—	—	—	3–0	—	—	3–1	1–1	1–3	—
Atlético San Luis	0–6	—	—	—	0–3	2–3	2–2	1–0	—	2–1	2–3	—	—	—	—	—	1–2	1–2
Cruz Azul	2–1	0–0	2–0	—	—	—	—	—	—	1–1	0–4	3–0	—	4–1	—	—	—	4–5
Guadalajara	—	—	—	2–0	—	—	2–1	1–2	—	3–1	3–3	—	0–0	6–0	3–1	—	1–1	—
Juárez	—	—	—	1–0	0–1	—	—	—	0–1	—	0–0	—	—	3–1	4–0	2–1	3–1	—
León	0–1	—	—	1–0	—	1–0	—	2–1	1–1	1–0	—	0–0	—	—	4–3	—	—	—
Mazatlán	1–8	0–2	—	1–5	—	0–6	—	—	—	—	—	—	0–2	—	1–3	2–5	0–2	2–1
Monterrey	2–4	5–0	1–0	1–0	3–2	—	—	6–1	—	—	—	—	—	4–1	—	5–0	—	—
Necaxa	—	0–1	—	—	—	0–2	—	1–2	0–4	—	0–5	—	0–3	1–0	—	1–4	—	—
Pachuca	—	3–0	—	—	—	—	1–0	7–0	0–0	—	—	2–0	3–1	3–0	2–2	—	—	—
Puebla	0–0	—	2–2	—	0–1	2–4	—	3–1	0–1	2–0	—	—	0–1	—	—	—	—	—
Querétaro	0–4	1–1	1–1	1–3	—	0–2	2–1	—	1–3	—	—	—	—	—	1–0	1–0	—	—
Santos Laguna	—	0–3	0–0	—	—	—	5–0	0–0	—	—	—	2–1	0–2	—	—	0–2	0–3	1–3
Tijuana	1–4	—	6–1	3–0	—	—	—	—	0–2	3–0	—	3–2	—	1–0	—	—	0–1	5–1
Toluca	—	—	4–0	3–1	2–0	—	2–0	—	—	—	1–3	1–0	—	—	2–4	—	0–6	1–2
UANL	0–1	—	—	2–0	—	—	1–0	—	0–0	6–0	2–1	3–0	5–3	—	—	—	—	3–1
UNAM	—	4–2	—	—	3–1	3–2	2–0	—	1–2	1–2	0–2	2–1	0–0	—	—	—	—	—

Updated to match(es) played on 3 November 2024. Source: Liga MX Femenil
Legend: Blue = home team win; Yellow = draw; Red = away team win.

=== Regular season statistics ===
==== Top goalscorers ====
Players sorted first by goals scored, then by last name.

Rank	Player	Club	Goals
1	(Mexico) Charlyn Corral	Pachuca	18
2	(Guatemala) Aisha Solórzano	Tijuana	16
3	(Mexico) Lizbeth Ovalle	UANL	15
4	(Mexico) Kiana Palacios	América	13
5	(Mexico) Alicia Cervantes	Guadalajara	11
5	(Portugal) Stephanie Ribeiro	UNAM	11
7	(United States) Sarah Luebbert	América	10
8	(Mexico) Christina Burkenroad	Monterrey	9
8	(Nigeria) Chinwendu Ihezuo	Pachuca	9
8	(Costa Rica) María Paula Salas	Atlas	9

Source:Liga MX Femenil

==== Hat-tricks ====
Player	For	Against	Result	Date	Round	Ref
(Mexico) Lizbeth Ovalle	UANL	Toluca	6 – 0 (A)	12 August 2024	5	
(Mexico) Lizbeth Ovalle	UANL	Necaxa	6 – 0 (A)	29 August 2024	3	
(Portugal) Stephanie Ribeiro	UNAM	Atlas	4 – 2 (H)	7 September 2024	9	
(Mexico) Kiana Palacios	América	Guadalajara	7 – 0 (H)	15 September 2024	10	
(Guatemala) Aisha Solórzano	Tijuana	UNAM	5 – 1 (H)	15 September 2024	10	
(Mexico) Alicia Cervantes	Guadalajara	Atlas	1 – 5 (A)	11 October 2024	15	
(Guatemala) Aisha Solórzano	Tijuana	Atlético San Luis	6 – 1 (H)	13 October 2024	15	
(Portugal) Stephanie Ribeiro	UNAM	Cruz Azul	4 – 5 (A)	19 October 2024	16	
(Mexico) Mariel Román	Toluca	Atlético San Luis	4 – 0 (H)	1 November 2024	17	
(Mexico) Alicia Cervantes	Guadalajara	Santos Laguna	6 – 0 (H)	3 November 2024	17	

(H) – Home; (A) – Away

- First goal of the season:
  (Nigeria) Chinwendu Ihezuo for Pachuca against Necaxa (4 July 2024)
- Last goal of the season:
  (Mexico) Christina Burkenroad for Monterrey against Tijuana (3 November 2024)

=== Discipline ===
==== Team ====
- Most yellow cards: 39
  - Pachuca
- Most red cards: 3
  - 3 teams
- Fewest yellow cards: 18
  - América
  - Cruz Azul
- Fewest red cards: 0
  - Atlético San Luis
  - Guadalajara

Source Liga MX Femenil

=== Attendance ===
==== Per team ====
Pos	Team	Total	High	Low	Average	Change
1	Monterrey	58,963	14,978	3,716	7,370	+8.2%
2	UANL	51,085	13,710	1,926	5,643	−15.0%
3	Guadalajara	25,809	4,927	132	2,868	−68.2%
4	Toluca	22,467	4,526	130	2,496	−9.9%
5	Juárez	17,348	4,054	1,242	2,169	−17.2%
6	América	16,481	5,708	358	2,060	+69.7%^{1}
7	UNAM	18,249	3,183	1,259	2,028	−25.9%
8	Tijuana	14,597	3,833	333	1,622	+18.3%
9	Atlético San Luis	12,447	3,635	495	1,386	+48.1%
10	Pachuca	9,948	1,726	809	1,244	−64.4%
11	Puebla	5,869	2,156	86	838	−15.9%
12	Atlas	5,797	3,498	200	725	+42.7%
13	Querétaro	6,500	2,651	248	722	−21.4%
14	Necaxa	3,861	806	328	618	−33.8%
15	León	4,613	1,870	269	577	−61.6%
16	Mazatlán	3,951	1,286	202	439	+0.5%
17	Santos Laguna	3,003	1,154	170	375	−28.3%
18	Cruz Azul	1,619	251	107	202	−3.8%
	League total	283,141	14,978	86	1,875	−23.7%

Source: Liga MX
Notes:
Only regular season listed
1: América was relocated from Estadio Azteca to Estadio Ciudad de los Deportes due to renovation works at the Estadio Azteca.

Source: Liga MX Femenil

==== Highest and lowest ====
Highest attended					Lowest attended			
Week	Home	Score	Away	Attendance	Home	Score	Away	Attendance
1	Juárez	0–1	Guadalajara	2,971	Cruz Azul	2–1	América	237
2	Monterrey	5–0	Atlas	6,422	Santos Laguna	0–0	Atlético San Luis	384
3	UANL	6–0	Necaxa	4,117	León	0–0	Puebla	616
4	Toluca	2–4	Tijuana	1,838	Cruz Azul	0–4	Pachuca	224
5	Monterrey	1–0	Atlético San Luis	5,564	León	1–0	Cruz Azul	334
6	UANL	3–1	UNAM	5,624	Cruz Azul	4–1	Santos Laguna	197
7	Monterrey	5–0	Toluca	4,522	Mazatlán	0–2	Querétaro	202
8	Toluca	2–0	Guadalajara	4,526	Cruz Azul	1–1	Necaxa	107
9	Monterrey	1–0	Cruz Azul	14,978	Guadalajara	3–1	Necaxa	132
10	UANL	0–0	Monterrey	13,710	Cruz Azul	2–0	Atlético San Luis	161
11	Monterrey	2–4	América	8,992	Santos Laguna	2–1	Puebla	227
12	UANL	2–0	Cruz Azul	3,798	Atlas	3–0	Atlético San Luis	200
13	Monterrey	6–1	Mazatlán	8,992	Puebla	0–1	Querétaro	86
14	UANL	0–1	América	9,701	Cruz Azul	3–0	Puebla	217
15	América	5–0	Pachuca	5,708	Toluca	3–1	Cruz Azul	130
16	Monterrey	3–2	Guadalajara	5,777	Santos Laguna	5–0	León	170
17	UANL	2–1	Pachuca	5,243	León	2–1	Mazatlán	269

Source: Liga MX

1. Does not include matches played behind closed doors and matches without attendance data.

=== Liguilla ===
The eight best teams play two games against each other on a home-and-away basis. The higher seeded teams play on their home field during the second leg. The winner of each match up is determined by aggregate score. In the quarterfinals and semifinals, if the two teams are tied on aggregate, the higher seeded team advances. In the final, if the two teams are tied after both legs, the match goes to a penalty shoot-out.

Quarter-finals
1	Monterrey (s)	0	1	1
8	Toluca	1	0	1
4	Pachuca (s)	0	2	2
5	Juárez	1	1	2
2	UANL	0	7	7
7	UNAM	0	1	1
3	América	4	3	7
6	Guadalajara	1	2	3

Semi-finals
1	Monterrey	3	4	7
4	Pachuca	0	1	1
2	UANL (s)	1	2	3
3	América	1	2	3

Final
1	Monterrey (p)	0	3	3 (4)
2	UANL	1	2	3 (3)

==== Quarter-finals ====
The first legs were played on 7 and 8 November, and the second legs were played on 10 and 11 November 2024.

Team 1	Agg.	Team 2	1st leg	2nd leg
Monterrey (s)	1–1	Toluca	0–1	1–0
UANL	7–1	UNAM	0–0	7–1
América	7–3	Guadalajara	4–1	3–2
Pachuca (s)	2–2	Juárez	0–1	2–1

Matches

8 November 2024
18:00 CST (UTC−6)

Toluca	1–0	Monterrey
Peraza 44'	Report

Estadio Nemesio Díez, Toluca
Attendance: 4,541
Referee: Itzel Hernández Fuentes (Oaxaca)
11 November 2024
19:00 CST (UTC−6)

Monterrey	1–0	Toluca
García 85'	Report

Estadio BBVA, Guadalupe
Referee: Diana Stephanía Pérez (Guanajuato)

1–1 on aggregate. Monterrey advanced due to being the higher seeded team.

8 November 2024
20:10 CST (UTC−6)

UNAM	0–0	UANL
	Report

Estadio Olímpico Universitario, Mexico City
Referee: Priscila Eritzel Pérez (Guanajuato)
11 November 2024
21:06 CST (UTC−6)

UANL	7–1	UNAM
Reyes 12', 14', 42'; Ovalle 65'; Kgatlana 67'; Mayor 78'; Montoya 90'	Report	Ribeiro 85'

Estadio Universitario, San Nicolás de los Garza
Referee: Katia Itzel García (Mexico City)

UANL won 7–1 on aggregate.

8 November 2024
17:15 CST (UTC−6)

Guadalajara	1–4	América
Salazar 21'	Report	Luebbert 13'; Guerrero 43' (pen.); Camberos 62'; Saldívar 79'

Estadio Akron, Zapopan
Attendance: 2,095
Referee: Karen Hernández Andrade (Aguascalientes)
11 November 2024
17:00 CST (UTC−6)

América	3–2	Guadalajara
Priscila 20'; Cervantes 39' (own); Luna 79'	Report	Jaramillo 49', 53'

Estadio Ciudad de los Deportes, Mexico City
Referee: Figo Rodolfo López (Sinaloa)

América won 7–3 on aggregate.

7 November 2024
21:06 CST (UTC−6)

Juárez	1–0	Pachuca
Chilufya 11'	Report

Estadio Olímpico Benito Juárez, Ciudad Juárez
Attendance: 8,010
Referee: Erika Monserrat González (Durango)
10 November 2024
19:06 CST (UTC−6)

Pachuca	2–1	Juárez
Pereira 40'; Corral 58'	Report	Martín 78'

Estadio Hidalgo, Pachuca
Attendance: 3,171
Referee: Francia María González (Guanajuato)

2–2 on aggregate. Pachuca advanced due to being the higher seeded team.

==== Semi-finals ====
The first legs were played on 14 and 15 November, and the second legs were played on 17 and 18 November 2024.

Team 1	Agg.	Team 2	1st leg	2nd leg
Monterrey	7–1	Pachuca	3–0	4–1
UANL (s)	3–3	América	1–1	2–2

Matches

15 November 2024
18:06 CST (UTC−6)

Pachuca	0–3	Monterrey
	Report	García 8', 77'; Bernal 58'

Estadio Hidalgo, Pachuca
Referee: Katia Itzel García (Mexico City)
18 November 2024
20:00 CST (UTC−6)

Monterrey	4–1	Pachuca
Burkenroad 4'; García 59'; Seoposenwe 62'; Bernal 90+3' (pen.)	Report	Corral 45'

Estadio BBVA, Guadalupe
Referee: Figo Rodolfo López (Sinaloa)

Monterrey won 7–1 on aggregate.

14 November 2024
21:00 CST (UTC−6)

América	1–1	UANL
Priscila 83'	Report	Kgatlana 16'

Estadio Ciudad de los Deportes, Mexico City
Referee: Francia María González (Guanajuato)
17 November 2024
19:06 CST (UTC−6)

UANL	2–2	América
Kgatlana 37'; Ovalle 59'	Report	Saldívar 73'; Luebbert 81'

Estadio Universitario, San Nicolás de los Garza
Referee: Diana Stephanía Pérez (Guanajuato)

3–3 on aggregate. UANL advanced due to being the higher seeded team.

==== Final ====
The first leg was played on 22 November, and the second leg was played on 25 November 2024.

Team 1	Agg.	Team 2	1st leg	2nd leg
Monterrey (p)	3–3 (4–3)	UANL	0–1	3–2

Matches

22 November 2024
20:06 CST (UTC−6)

UANL	1–0	Monterrey
Espinoza 79'	Report

Estadio Universitario, San Nicolás de los Garza
Attendance: 32,534
Referee: Diana Stephanía Pérez (Guanajuato)
25 November 2024
20:00 CST (UTC−6)

Monterrey	3–2	UANL
Sánchez 52'; García 54'; Martínez 90+7'	Report	Ovalle 41'; Dias 44'
Penalties
Martínez (penalty scored); Bernal (penalty scored); Delgadillo (penalty missed); Tajonar (penalty missed); García (penalty scored) van Dongen (penalty scored)	4–3	Ovalle (penalty scored); López (penalty missed); Villarreal (penalty missed); Mayor (penalty scored); Rodríguez (penalty scored); Seiça (penalty missed)

Estadio BBVA, Guadalupe
Attendance: 50,008
Referee: Katia Itzel García (Mexico City)

3–3 on aggregate. Monterrey won 4-3 on penalty shoot–out.

Apertura 2024 winners

4th title

== Torneo Clausura ==
The Torneo Clausura 2025 is the second tournament of the season. The tournament began on 3 January 2025.

=== Regular season ===
==== Standings ====
Pos	Team	Pld	W	D	L	GF	GA	GD	Pts	Qualification or relegation
1	América	17	13	2	2	60	14	+46	41	Advance to Liguilla (Note: The first 8 places in the table qualify for the Liguilla.)
2	Pachuca (C)	17	11	5	1	40	14	+26	38	Advance to Liguilla
3	UNAM	17	11	4	2	36	13	+23	37	Advance to Liguilla
4	Monterrey	17	10	3	4	41	23	+18	33	Advance to Liguilla
5	UANL	17	9	4	4	41	14	+27	31	Advance to Liguilla
6	Guadalajara	17	8	6	3	28	10	+18	30	Advance to Liguilla
7	Atlas	17	9	1	7	30	22	+8	28	Advance to Liguilla
8	Juárez	17	7	5	5	21	23	−2	26	Advance to Liguilla
9	Querétaro	17	6	6	5	18	26	−8	24	
10	Cruz Azul	17	6	5	6	32	19	+13	23	
11	Toluca	17	7	2	8	29	30	−1	23	
12	León	17	6	3	8	23	33	−10	21	
13	Tijuana	17	4	7	6	22	24	−2	19	
14	Atlético San Luis	17	6	1	10	13	32	−19	19	
15	Necaxa	17	4	1	12	13	39	−26	13	
16	Mazatlán	17	3	2	12	12	57	−45	11	
17	Santos Laguna	17	2	0	15	15	45	−30	6	
18	Puebla	17	1	3	13	8	44	−36	6	

Updated to match(es) played on 18 April 2025. Source: Liga MX Femenil
Rules for classification: 1) Points; 2) Goal difference; 3) Number of goals scored; 4) Head-to-head results between tied teams; 5) Number of goals scored away; 6) Highest relegation coefficient; 7) Fair Play points
(C) Champions

==== Positions by round ====
Qualification to quarter-finals
Last place in table

Team ╲ Round	1	2	3	4	5	6	7	8	9	10	11	12	13	14	15	16	17
América	8	2	1	1	1	2	2	2	2	2	2	1	2	2	1	1	1
Pachuca	2	3	2	2	2	1	1	1	1	1	1	2	1	1	2	2	2
UNAM	6	10	7	7	5	4	5	3	3	3	3	4	4	3	3	3	3
Monterrey	1	1	6	3	3	5	4	5	7	5	5	7	6	6	6	5	4
UANL	12	8	11	12	9	9	8	7	5	4	4	3	3	4	4	4	5
Guadalajara	3	4	3	5	8	7	6	6	4	6	7	6	5	5	5	6	6
Atlas	13	14	12	15	12	12	10	8	10	11	13	11	9	11	8	8	7
Juárez	4	5	4	6	4	3	3	4	6	7	6	5	7	7	7	7	8
Querétaro	17	18	14	9	7	8	11	11	9	8	8	8	10	8	9	10	9
Cruz Azul	11	12	15	13	11	11	12	13	13	14	12	10	8	9	10	11	10
Toluca	9	6	9	11	14	14	14	14	14	12	14	14	14	13	13	12	11
León	10	13	10	10	13	13	13	12	12	10	10	13	13	12	12	9	12
Tijuana	7	7	5	8	10	10	9	9	8	9	9	9	11	10	11	13	13
Atlético San Luis	14	11	8	4	6	6	7	10	11	13	11	12	12	14	14	14	14
Necaxa	16	15	17	16	16	15	15	15	15	16	16	15	15	15	16	15	15
Mazatlán	18	17	18	18	18	18	18	18	17	15	15	16	16	16	15	16	16
Santos Laguna	5	9	13	14	15	16	16	16	16	17	17	17	17	18	18	18	17
Puebla	15	16	16	17	17	17	17	17	18	18	18	18	18	17	17	17	18

Updated to match(es) played on 18 April 2025. Source: Liga MX Femenil

==== Results ====
Each team plays once all other teams in 17 rounds regardless of it being a home or away match.

Home \ Away	AME	ATL	ASL	CAZ	GUA	JUA	LEO	MAZ	MON	NEC	PAC	PUE	QUE	SAN	TIJ	TOL	UNL	UNM
América	—	—	4–0	2–1	—	—	5–0	6–0	3–2	—	—	7–0	7–0	—	4–1	—	2–1	—
Atlas	0–3	—	—	1–1	—	—	—	4–1	2–1	4–1	2–3	—	1–0	1–3	—	—	—	0–1
Atlético San Luis	—	0–4	—	1–5	—	—	—	—	1–0	—	—	1–0	1–2	3–0	2–0	1–0	—	—
Cruz Azul	—	—	—	—	1–1	5–0	1–2	4–0	2–3	—	—	—	0–0	—	1–1	2–1	1–2	—
Guadalajara	1–1	2–0	3–1	—	—	0–0	—	—	0–1	—	—	3–0	—	—	—	1–0	—	0–0
Juárez	1–1	1–0	2–0	—	—	—	4–1	0–1	—	1–0	—	3–0	1–0	—	—	—	—	1–1
León	—	4–3	0–1	—	1–3	—	—	—	—	—	0–2	—	0–0	3–1	—	1–1	2–2	2–3
Mazatlán	—	—	0–0	—	0–8	—	1–2	—	0–7	3–1	0–2	3–0	—	1–2	—	—	—	—
Monterrey	—	—	—	—	—	2–1	2–0	—	—	4–0	2–2	5–1	3–1	—	1–1	—	1–5	2–1
Necaxa	0–5	—	3–0	1–0	0–3	—	1–0	—	—	—	—	1–1	—	—	1–3	—	0–4	1–4
Pachuca	2–1	—	5–0	2–2	1–0	6–1	—	—	—	1–0	—	—	—	—	—	2–3	0–0	1–1
Puebla	—	0–3	—	0–5	—	—	1–2	—	—	—	0–1	—	—	2–1	2–2	1–3	0–3	0–1
Querétaro	—	—	—	—	1–1	—	—	3–1	—	1–0	1–7	0–0	—	3–0	—	—	1–1	2–2
Santos Laguna	0–3	—	—	0–1	0–1	1–2	—	—	1–3	2–3	1–3	—	—	—	1–3	—	—	—
Tijuana	—	0–1	—	—	1–1	2–2	2–3	1–1	—	—	0–0	—	0–1	—	—	3–1	—	—
Toluca	4–3	0–2	—	—	—	3–1	—	5–0	2–2	3–0	—	—	1–2	2–1	—	—	—	—
UANL	—	1–2	2–1	—	2–0	0–0	—	7–0	—	—	—	—	—	5–0	1–2	5–0	—	—
UNAM	1–3	—	2–0	2–0	—	—	—	5–0	—	—	—	—	—	6–1	1–0	3–0	2–0	—

Updated to match(es) played on 18 April 2025. Source: Liga MX Femenil
Legend: Blue = home team win; Yellow = draw; Red = away team win.

=== Regular season statistics ===
==== Top goalscorers ====
Players sorted first by goals scored, then by last name.

Rank	Player	Club	Goals
1	(Mexico) Charlyn Corral	Pachuca	21
2	(United States) Aerial Chavarin	Cruz Azul	16
3	(Portugal) Stephanie Ribeiro	UNAM	13
4	(Mexico) Lizbeth Ovalle	UANL	11
5	(Costa Rica) María Paula Salas	Atlas	10
6	(Mexico) Daniela Espinosa	América	9
7	(Mexico) Christina Burkenroad	Monterrey	8
7	(Mexico) Paola García	Atlas	8
7	(Brazil) Priscila	América	8
7	(Mexico) Montserrat Saldívar	América	8

Source:Liga MX Femenil

==== Hat-tricks ====
Player	For	Against	Result	Date	Round	Ref
(Mexico) Charlyn Corral	Pachuca	Querétaro	1 – 7 (A)	6 January 2025	1	
(Brazil) Priscila	América	Querétaro	7 – 0 (H)	10 January 2025	2	
(Portugal) Stephanie Ribeiro	UNAM	Santos Laguna	6 – 1 (H)	14 January 2025	3	
(Spain) Lucía García	Monterrey	Puebla	5 – 1 (H)	19 January 2025	4	
(Mexico) Charlyn Corral	Pachuca	Atlético San Luis	5 – 0 (H)	26 January 2025	5	
(Mexico) Daniela Espinosa	América	Mazatlán	6 – 0 (H)	6 February 2025	7	
(Mexico) Charlyn Corral	Pachuca	Juárez	6 – 1 (H)	10 February 2025	8	
(Costa Rica) María Paula Salas^{4}	Atlas	Atlético San Luis	0 – 4 (A)	30 March 2025	15	
(Netherlands) Shanice van de Sanden	Toluca	Puebla	1 – 3 (A)	13 April 2025	16	
(Costa Rica) María Paula Salas	Atlas	Mazatlán	4 – 1 (H)	13 April 2025	16	

^{4} Player scored four goals
(H) – Home; (A) – Away

- First goal of the season: (Uganda) Sandra Nabweteme for Santos Laguna against Atlas (3 January 2025)
- Last goal of the season: (Mexico) Christina Burkenroad for Monterrey against León (18 April 2025)

=== Discipline ===
==== Team ====
- Most yellow cards: 41
  - Atlético San Luis
- Most red cards: 4
  - Querétaro
- Fewest yellow cards: 14
  - Monterrey
- Fewest red cards: 0
  - 5 teams

Source Liga MX Femenil

=== Attendance ===
==== Per team ====
Pos	Team	Total	High	Low	Average	Change
1	Monterrey	69,469	21,748	1,265	7,719	+4.7%
2	Guadalajara	32,104	10,371	159	4,586	+59.9%^{1}
3	UANL	33,614	5,293	2,645	4,202	−25.5%
4	UNAM	29,901	9,864	1,245	3,738	+84.3%
5	Toluca	26,483	8,281	1,906	3,310	+32.6%
6	Pachuca	29,353	8,412	959	3,261	+162.1%
7	América	29,097	7,700	575	3,233	+56.9%
8	Juárez	15,295	3,979	927	1,699	−21.7%
9	León	10,562	3,040	402	1,174	+103.5%
10	Tijuana	7,264	1,633	233	908	−44.0%
11	Necaxa	7,188	2,061	264	899	+45.5%
12	Atlético San Luis	6,320	1,191	525	790	−43.0%
13	Querétaro	4,663	1,810	286	666	−7.8%^{2}
14	Atlas	5,603	2,789	284	633	−12.7%
15	Santos Laguna	4,223	1,876	164	528	+40.8%
16	Puebla	3,971	1,148	222	441	−47.4%
17	Mazatlán	2,290	537	106	286	−34.9%
18	Cruz Azul	2,045	265	194	227	+12.4%
	League total	316,205	21,748	106	2,067	+10.2%

Source: Liga MX
Notes:
Only regular season listed
1: Guadalajara played the match against América at Estadio Jalisco and they played the match against Atlas at Instalaciones Verde Valle.
2:Querétaro played tha match against UNAM behind closed doors.

Source: Liga MX Femenil

==== Highest and lowest ====
Highest attended					Lowest attended			
Week	Home	Score	Away	Attendance	Home	Score	Away	Attendance
1	UANL	1–2	Tijuana	4,219	Mazatlán	0–7	Monterrey	332
2	Toluca	5–0	Mazatlán	1,989	Cruz Azul	1–1	Tijuana	194
3	UANL	1–2	Atlas	2,896	Puebla	1–2	León	222
4	Monterrey	5–1	Puebla	3,079	Santos Laguna	2–3	Necaxa	164
5	Guadalajara	0–1	Monterrey	5,420	Cruz Azul	4–0	Mazatlán	209
6	Monterrey	1–1	Tijuana	9,443	Atlas	1–1	Cruz Azul	361
7	Monterrey	4–0	Necaxa	2,746	Cruz Azul	1–2	UANL	265
8	América	3–2	Monterrey	3,974	Mazatlán	1–2	León	185
9	Monterrey	1–5	UANL	21,748	Santos Laguna	1–3	Pachuca	252
10	UANL	2–0	Guadalajara	5,293	Mazatlán	3–0	Puebla	106
11	Guadalajara	1–1	América	10,371	Puebla	2–2	Tijuana	331
12	UANL	5–0	Santos Laguna	4,563	Mazatlán	0–0	Atlético San Luis	159
13	UANL	7–0	Mazatlán	5,191	Puebla	0–1	Pachuca	327
14	América	2–1	UANL	7,700	Guadalajara	2–0	Atlas	159
15	UANL	0–0	Juárez	4,631	Cruz Azul	0–0	Querétaro	197
16	Monterrey	3–1	Querétaro	9,107	Atlas	4–1	Mazatlán	383
17	Monterrey	2–0	León	9,851	Cruz Azul	5–0	Juárez	231

Source: Liga MX

1. Does not include matches played behind closed doors and matches without attendance data.

=== Liguilla ===
The eight best teams play two games against each other on a home-and-away basis. The higher seeded teams play on their home field during the second leg. The winner of each match up is determined by aggregate score. In the quarterfinals and semifinals, if the two teams are tied on aggregate, the higher seeded team advances. In the final, if the two teams are tied after both legs, the match goes to a penalty shoot-out.

Quarter-finals
1	América	2	5	7
8	Juárez	2	0	2
3	UNAM	0	0	0
6	Guadalajara	2	1	3
2	Pachuca	1	4	5
7	Atlas	1	1	2
4	Monterrey (s)	1	1	2
5	UANL	1	1	2

Semi-finals
1	América	2	2	4
6	Guadalajara	2	0	2
2	Pachuca	0	4	4
4	Monterrey	1	1	2

Final
1	América	0	2	2
2	Pachuca	3	0	3

==== Quarter-finals ====
The first legs were played on 23, 24 and 25 April, and the second legs were played on 26, 27 and 28 April 2025.

Team 1	Agg.	Team 2	1st leg	2nd leg
América	7–2	Juárez	2–2	5–0
Pachuca	5–2	Atlas	1–1	4–1
UNAM	0–3	Guadalajara	0–2	0–1
Monterrey (s)	2–2	UANL	1–1	1–1

Matches

23 April 2025
21:00 CST (UTC−6)

Juárez	2–2	América
Casarez 69'; Mercado 88' (pen.)	Report	Camberos 55'; Mauleón 58'

Estadio Olímpico Benito Juárez, Ciudad Juárez
Referee: José Maximiliano Negrete (Guanajuato)
26 April 2025
19:00 CST (UTC−6)

América	5–0	Juárez
Okeke 24', 45+3'; Hernández 28'; Saldívar 40', 57'	Report

Estadio Ciudad de los Deportes, Mexico City
Attendance: 8,423
Referee: Diana Stephanía Pérez (Guanajuato)

América won 7–2 on aggregate.

23 April 2025
19:00 CST (UTC−6)

Atlas	1–1	Pachuca
Salas 44'	Report	Corral 63'

Estadio Jalisco, Guadalajara
Attendance: 1,285
Referee: Ana Paola Hernández (Aguascalientes)
26 April 2025
21:00 CST (UTC−6)

Pachuca	4–1	Atlas
Oke 12'; Corral 59', 71'; Flores 83'	Report	Salas 68'

Estadio Hidalgo, Pachuca
Referee: Priscila Eritzel Pérez (Guanajuato)

Pachuca won 5–2 on aggregate.

24 April 2025
19:00 CST (UTC−6)

Guadalajara	2–0	UNAM
Salazar 59'; Cervantes 78'	Report

Estadio Akron, Zapopan
Referee: Carlos Iván Trejo (State of Mexico)
27 April 2025
12:00 CST (UTC−6)

UNAM	0–1	Guadalajara
	Report	Cervantes 69'

Estadio Olímpico Universitario, Mexico City
Referee: Ximena Márquez Ruíz (Mexico City)

Guadalajara won 0–3 on aggregate.

25 April 2025
20:00 CST (UTC−6)

UANL	1–1	Monterrey
Ovalle 14'	Report	Burkenroad 90+2'

Estadio Universitario, San Nicolás de los Garza
Referee: Figo Rodolfo López (Sinaloa)
28 April 2025
20:00 CST (UTC−6)

Monterrey	1–1	UANL
Seoposenwe 90+2'	Report	Jheniffer 36'

Estadio BBVA, Guadalupe
Referee: Francia María González (Guanajuato)

2–2 on aggregate. Monterrey advanced due to being the higher seeded team.

==== Semi-finals ====
The first legs were played on 1 and 2 May, and the second legs will be played on 4 and 5 May 2025.

Team 1	Agg.	Team 2	1st leg	2nd leg
América	4–2	Guadalajara	2–2	2–0
Pachuca	4–2	Monterrey	0–1	4–1

1 May 2025
19:05 CST (UTC−6)

Guadalajara	2–2	América
Cervantes 52', 73'	Report	Saldívar 40'; Antonio 90'

Estadio Akron, Zapopan
Referee: Ana Paola Hernández Ortíz (Aguascalientes)
4 May 2025
17:00 CST (UTC−6)

América	2–0	Guadalajara
Palacios 45'; Saldívar 47'	Report

Estadio Ciudad de los Deportes, Mexico City
Referee: Priscila Eritzel Pérez (Guanajuato)

América won 4–2 on aggregate.

2 May 2025
20:00 CST (UTC−6)

Monterrey	1–0	Pachuca
Van Dongen 45'	Report

Estadio BBVA, Guadalupe
Referee: Ximena Márquez Ruíz (Mexico City)
5 May 2025
19:00 CST (UTC−6)

Pachuca	4–1	Monterrey
Ihezuo 30', 61', 69'; Robles 43'	Report

Estadio Hidalgo, Pachuca
Referee: Diana Stephanía Pérez (Guanajuato)

Pachuca won 4–2 on aggregate.

==== Final ====
The first leg was played on 9 May, and the second leg was played on 12 May 2025.

Team 1	Agg.	Team 2	1st leg	2nd leg
América	2–3	Pachuca	0–3	2–0

9 May 2025
20:00 CST (UTC−6)

Pachuca	3–0	América
Corral 3', 13'; Nicosia 54'	Report

Estadio Hidalgo, Pachuca
Referee: Priscila Eritzel Pérez (Guanajuato)
12 May 2025
19:00 CST (UTC−6)

América	2–0	Pachuca
Guerrero 35'; Camberos 54'	Report

Estadio Ciudad de los Deportes, Mexico City
Referee: Diana Stephanía Pérez (Guanajuato)

Pachuca won 2–3 on aggregate.

Clausura 2025 winners

1st title

== Aggregate table 2024–25 ==
The aggregate table (the sum of points of both the Apertura 2024 and Clausura 2025 tournaments) will be used to determine seeds in the Campeón de Campeones and the place of best runner–up for the 2025–26 CONCACAF W Champions Cup.

Pos	Team	Pld	W	D	L	GF	GA	GD	Pts	Qualification
1	América (Y)	34	25	6	3	115	25	+90	81	Qualification for the 2025–26 CONCACAF W Champions Cup
2	Pachuca (X)	34	22	9	3	82	30	+52	75	Qualification for the 2025–26 CONCACAF W Champions Cup
3	Monterrey (A)	34	23	6	5	82	34	+48	75	Qualification for the 2025–26 CONCACAF W Champions Cup
4	UANL	34	22	6	6	82	26	+56	72	
5	UNAM	34	20	6	8	69	44	+25	66	
6	Guadalajara	34	17	9	8	62	35	+27	60	
7	Juárez	34	17	7	10	53	37	+16	58	
8	Atlas	34	16	5	13	53	49	+4	53	
9	Toluca	34	15	4	15	61	60	+1	49	
10	Querétaro	34	13	10	11	40	51	−11	49	
11	Tijuana	34	12	8	14	58	55	+3	44	
12	Cruz Azul	34	12	7	15	57	46	+11	43	
13	León	34	11	7	16	37	56	−19	40	
14	Atlético San Luis	34	8	5	21	28	73	−45	29	
15	Mazatlán	34	6	3	25	26	112	−86	21	
16	Necaxa	34	6	2	26	21	84	−63	20	
17	Puebla	34	3	6	25	21	73	−52	15	
18	Santos Laguna	34	4	2	28	26	83	−57	14	

Updated to match(es) played on 18 April 2025. Source: Liga MX Femenil
Rules for classification: 1) Points; 2) Goal difference; 3) Number of goals scored; 4) Head-to-head results between tied teams; 5) Number of goals scored away; 6) Highest relegation coefficient; 7) Fair Play points
(A) Apertura champion; (X) Clausura champion; (Y) Best season runner–up

== Aggregate table 2024 ==
The aggregate table (the sum of points of both the Clausura 2024 and Apertura 2024 tournaments) would be used for to determine the six Liga MX Femenil teams that should have participated in the NWSL x Liga MX Femenil Summer Cup 2025. However, the 2025 Summer Cup was canceled due to scheduling issues.

Pos	Team	Pld	W	D	L	GF	GA	GD	Pts
1	UANL	34	27	4	3	92	22	+70	85
2	Monterrey	34	25	5	4	87	23	+64	80
3	Pachuca	34	24	7	3	92	31	+61	79
4	América	34	23	6	5	102	30	+72	75
5	Guadalajara	34	18	8	8	69	41	+28	62
6	Juárez	34	17	8	9	64	34	+30	59
7	UNAM	34	17	6	11	77	65	+12	57
8	Toluca	34	15	8	11	65	54	+11	53
9	León	34	13	8	13	45	47	−2	47
10	Querétaro	34	13	8	13	42	55	−13	47
11	Tijuana	34	14	4	16	68	62	+6	46
12	Atlas	34	11	10	13	40	51	−11	43
13	Cruz Azul	34	8	4	22	43	75	−32	28
14	Puebla	34	6	9	19	34	58	−24	27
15	Mazatlán	34	7	2	25	34	109	−75	23
16	Necaxa	34	5	4	25	24	88	−64	19
17	Atlético San Luis	34	3	7	24	31	87	−56	16
18	Santos Laguna	34	4	4	26	26	103	−77	16

Updated to match(es) played on 3 November 2024. Source: Liga MX Femenil
Rules for classification: 1) Points; 2) Goal difference; 3) Number of goals scored; 4) Head-to-head results between tied teams; 5) Number of goals scored away; 6) Highest relegation coefficient; 7) Fair Play points

== Campeón de Campeonas ==
On May 24, 2021, the Liga MX Owners Assembly made official the creation of the Campeón de Campeonas ("Champion of Women's Champions"), a tournament between the two winning teams of the season's tournaments made with the goal of premiering the best team in all the annual cycle of Mexican women's football. Starting this season, Liga MX has decided to hold a single match at a neutral venue to determine the winner of the trophy.

16 July 2025
20:00 CDT (UTC−5)

Pachuca	1–0	Monterrey
	Report	Nicosia 53'

Toyota Field, San Antonio

2024–25 winners

1st title
