= Ayo Oke (soccer) =

American soccer player (born 2003)

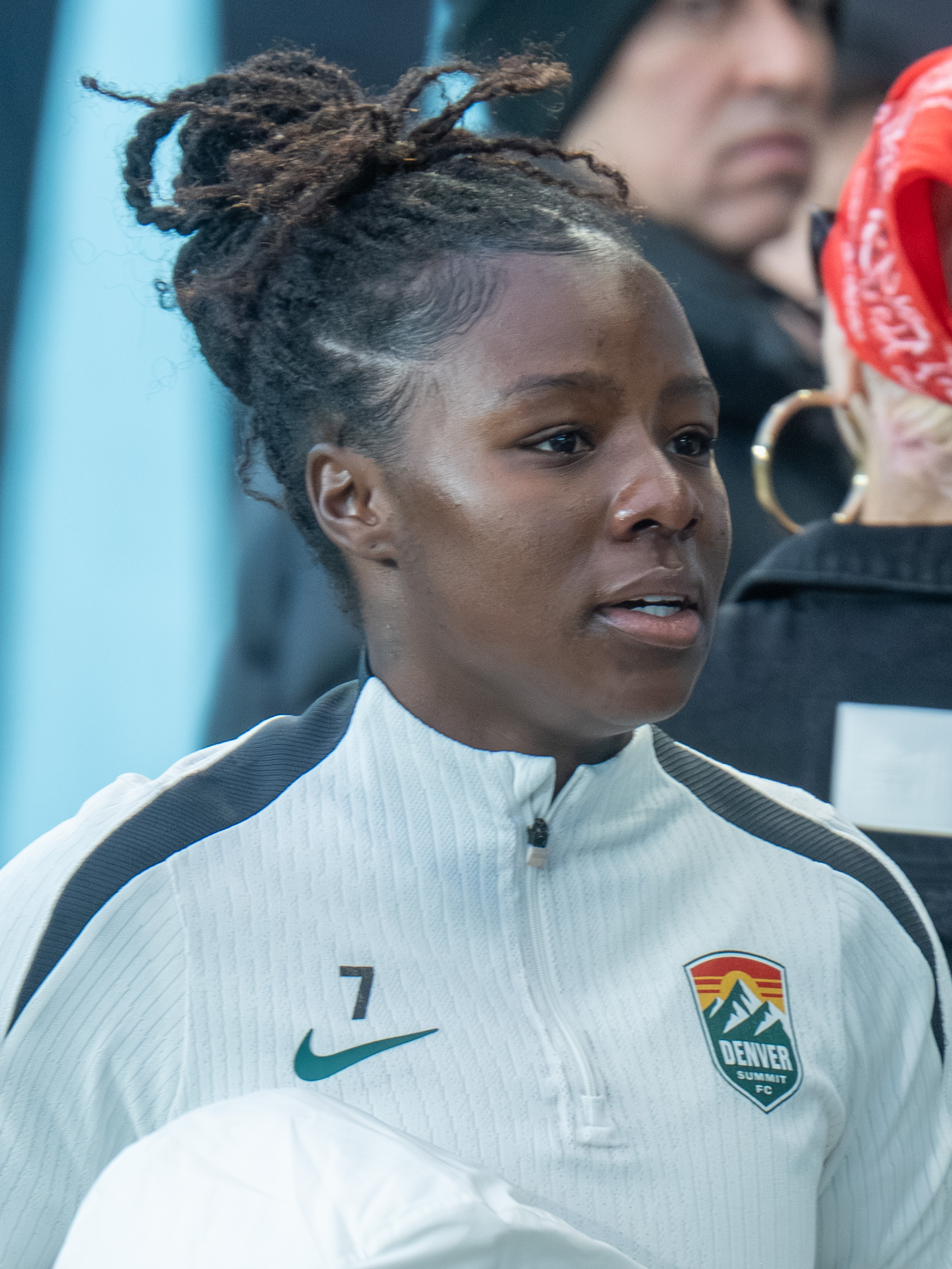
- Oke with the Denver Summit in 2026

Personal information
- Full name: Ayooluwa Naomi Oke
- Date of birth: April 5, 2003 (age 23)
- Place of birth: Lawrenceville, Georgia, U.S.
- Height: 5 ft 3 in (1.60 m)
- Positions: Right back; winger

Team information
- Current team: Denver Summit
- Number: 7

College career
Years	Team	Apps	(Gls)
2021–2022	California Golden Bears	33	(2)
2023–2024	UCLA Bruins	32	(3)

Senior career*
Years	Team	Apps	(Gls)
2025	Pachuca	31	(1)
2026–	Denver Summit	29	(0)

International career^{‡}
2018	United States U-15		
2018	United States U-16		
2019	United States U-17	4	(0)
2019	United States U-18	4	(0)
2022	United States U-20	11	(0)
2025–	United States U-23	3	(0)
2026–	United States	1	(0)
- * Club domestic league appearances and goals as of 06:39, November 8, 2026 (UTC) ‡ National team caps and goals as of 14:08, March 8, 2026 (UTC)

Ayooluwa Naomi Oke (born April 5, 2003) is an American professional soccer player who plays as a right back and right midfielder for Denver Summit FC of the National Women's Soccer League (NWSL) and the United States national team. Oke played college soccer for the California Golden Bears and the UCLA Bruins. She began her professional career with Pachuca in 2025, helping the club win their first Liga MX Femenil title.

Oke represented the United States at the youth international level, appearing at the 2022 FIFA U-20 Women's World Cup, before making her senior debut in 2026.

== Early life ==
Oke was born in Lawrenceville, Georgia, the daughter of Nigerian parents Kolade and Ronke Oke, and has an older brother. She began playing soccer with the Gwinnett Soccer Association in Lilburn, Georgia. She then joined DA clubs Concorde Fire and NASA Tophat, being named United Soccer Coaches All-American. She committed to play college soccer for the California Golden Bears as a sophomore at Brookwood High School. TopDrawerSoccer ranked her as the 25th-best recruit in the 2021 class, part of Cal's top-ranked recruiting class.

== College career ==
Oke played in 13 games, making 11 starts, and scored 1 goal for the California Golden Bears as a freshman in 2021, being named to the Pac-12 Conference all-freshman team. She started in 20 games, scored 1 goal, and jointly led the Pac-12 with 9 assists as a sophomore in 2022, earning second-team All-Pac-12 honors.

Oke then transferred to the reigning national champion UCLA Bruins, starting all 19 games and scoring 1 goal with 4 assists in 2023. She contributed to 11 clean sheets and was again named to the All-Pac-12 second team. UCLA won the Pac-12 Conference and earned a one seed in the NCAA tournament, but was upset in the first round. She dealt with injury during her senior season in 2024, making 5 starts and scoring 2 goals with 1 assist in 15 games. She had two goal contributions in the Big Ten Tournament as the Bruins won the tournament in their first year in the conference, then scored again in their loss in the NCAA tournament second round.

== Club career ==
=== Pachuca ===
Liga MX Femenil club Pachuca announced on January 14, 2025, that they had signed Oke to her first professional contract. She made her professional debut one day later as a substitute in 2–2 draw with Cruz Azul. In the playoffs, she scored her first professional goal in a 4–1 victory over Atlas in the quarterfinals second leg. She started both legs of the semifinals against Monterrey, helping the Tuzas to their fourth league final though she injured her ankle in the return leg. Due to the injury, she played limited minutes in the Clausura 2025 final as Pachuca defeated América to win their first Liga MX Femenil championship. On July 16, she played the entire match in a 1–0 win over Monterrey to win the Campeón de Campeonas trophy. Oke then helped Pachuca finish second in the Apertura 2025 regular season, but lost in the playoff quarterfinals. She also helped secure the club's passage to the CONCACAF W Champions Cup semifinals.

=== Denver Summit ===
On January 6, 2026, NWSL expansion team Denver Summit FC announced that they had acquired Oke and signed her to a three-year contract. ESPN reported that the transfer fee was close to US$450,000, the most expensive transfer for an American coming into the NWSL. She made her NWSL debut in the Summit's inaugural game, playing the entire match in a 2–1 loss to Bay FC on March 14.

== International career ==
Oke began training with the United States under-15 team in 2017. In 2018, she helped the under-16 team win the UEFA Under-16 Development Tournament. She continued playing friendlies with the under-18 and under-19 teams the following year. Following the COVID-19 pandemic, she helped the under-20 team win the 2022 CONCACAF Women's U-20 Championship, playing in six games with two starts. She played in two games at the 2022 FIFA U-20 Women's World Cup, starting in their 3–0 loss to the Netherlands, as the United States failed to make it out of the group stage. She played for the under-23 team against NWSL competition in the 2023 preseason.

Emma Hayes called up Oke to the senior national team for the first time in January 2026, replacing Avery Patterson who was out with an illness. She made her senior international debut on January 27, starting and assisting the opening goal by Croix Bethune in a 5–0 friendly win over Chile.

== Career statistics ==
=== International ===
As of match played January 27, 2026

Appearances and goals by national team and year
National team	Year	Apps	Goals
United States	2026	1	0
Total		1	0

== Honors ==
UCLA Bruins

- Pac-12 Conference: 2023
- Big Ten women's soccer tournament: 2024

Pachuca

- Liga MX Femenil: Clausura 2025
- Campeón de Campeonas: 2025

United States U-20

- CONCACAF Women's U-20 Championship: 2022

Individual

- Second-team All-Pac-12: 2022, 2023
- Pac-12 all-freshman team: 2021
