= Nina Nicosia =

Mexican footballer (born 2003)

Personal information
- Full name: Nina Dominique Nicosia
- Date of birth: 2 February 2003 (age 23)
- Place of birth: La Grange, Illinois, U.S.
- Height: 1.73 m (5 ft 8 in)
- Position: Winger

Team information
- Current team: Pachuca
- Number: 10

College career
Years	Team	Apps	(Gls)
2021	Louisville Cardinals	16	(3)

Senior career*
Years	Team	Apps	(Gls)
2022–2023	Chicago Mustangs		
2023–	Pachuca	82	(19)

International career^{‡}
2020	Argentina U17		
2022	Argentina U20		
2025	Argentina	1	(0)
- * Club domestic league appearances and goals as of 8 November 2025 ‡ National team caps and goals as of 20 April 2024

Nina Dominique Nicosia (born 2 February 2003) is a professional footballer who plays as a midfielder for Pachuca of Liga MX Femenil. Born in the United States and a former Argentina international, she was called up to the Mexico national team.

== Early life ==
Nicosia was born on 2 February 2003 in La Grange, Illinois, United States to American parents – her father being the son of Argentinians and her mother being of Mexican descent.

== Youth and college career ==
Nicosia played for the Chicago Magic, Chicago Inferno, and Eclipse Select SC. In 2021, she played for the Louisville Cardinals, where she played the second half of the year, totaling 16 games with 3 goals and 4 assists.

== Club career ==
Nicosia was transferred to the Chicago Mustangs in the 2022 spring transfer market. In August 2022, she was awarded the Central Conference's "Offensive Player of the Year" after a season in which she became one of the most outstanding attacking forces.

On 6 July 2023, Nicosia signed with Pachuca of Liga MX Femenil. In the Clausura 2025 final, Pachuca had beaten América 3–0 in the first-leg of the final with Nicosia herself scoring the third goal, while América was unable to overcome this despite winning the second-leg, with the final aggregate score being 3–2 in favor of Pachuca and therefore giving Pachuca their first league title in history. In the 2025 Campeón de Campeonas, Nicosia scored Pachuca's only goal in the 53rd minute, resulting in a 1–0 win over Monterrey.

== International career ==
Nicosia was eligible to represent the United States, Argentina and Mexico at the international level.

=== Argentina ===
On 7 March 2020, Nicosia was called up to the U-17 women's national team. In April 2022, she was called up to play for the U-20 national team for the South American Championship in Chile.

Nicosia was named to the senior national team for the CONCACAF W Gold Cup on 9 February 2024. She made her debut and only appearance with the senior team on 8 April 2025, in Argentina's 1–0 victory against Canada.

=== Mexico ===
In March 2026, Nicosia disclosed her intention to play for the Mexico national team. Two months later, she was called up for the first time.

== Personal life ==
Nicosia's favorite soccer players are Lionel Messi and Alex Morgan. Her father, Gustavo Nicosia, born in Chicago to Argentinian parents, played professionally for clubs in Argentina, Italy, and Chicago, and is the one who accompanies and supports her in her journey as a soccer player. Nicosia spent a week at the Olympique Lyonnais facilities as part of the Generation Adidas program.

== Honours ==
Pachuca

- Liga MX Femenil: Clausura 2025
- Campeón de Campeonas: 2025
