= Mónica Alvarado =

Mexican footballer (born 1991)

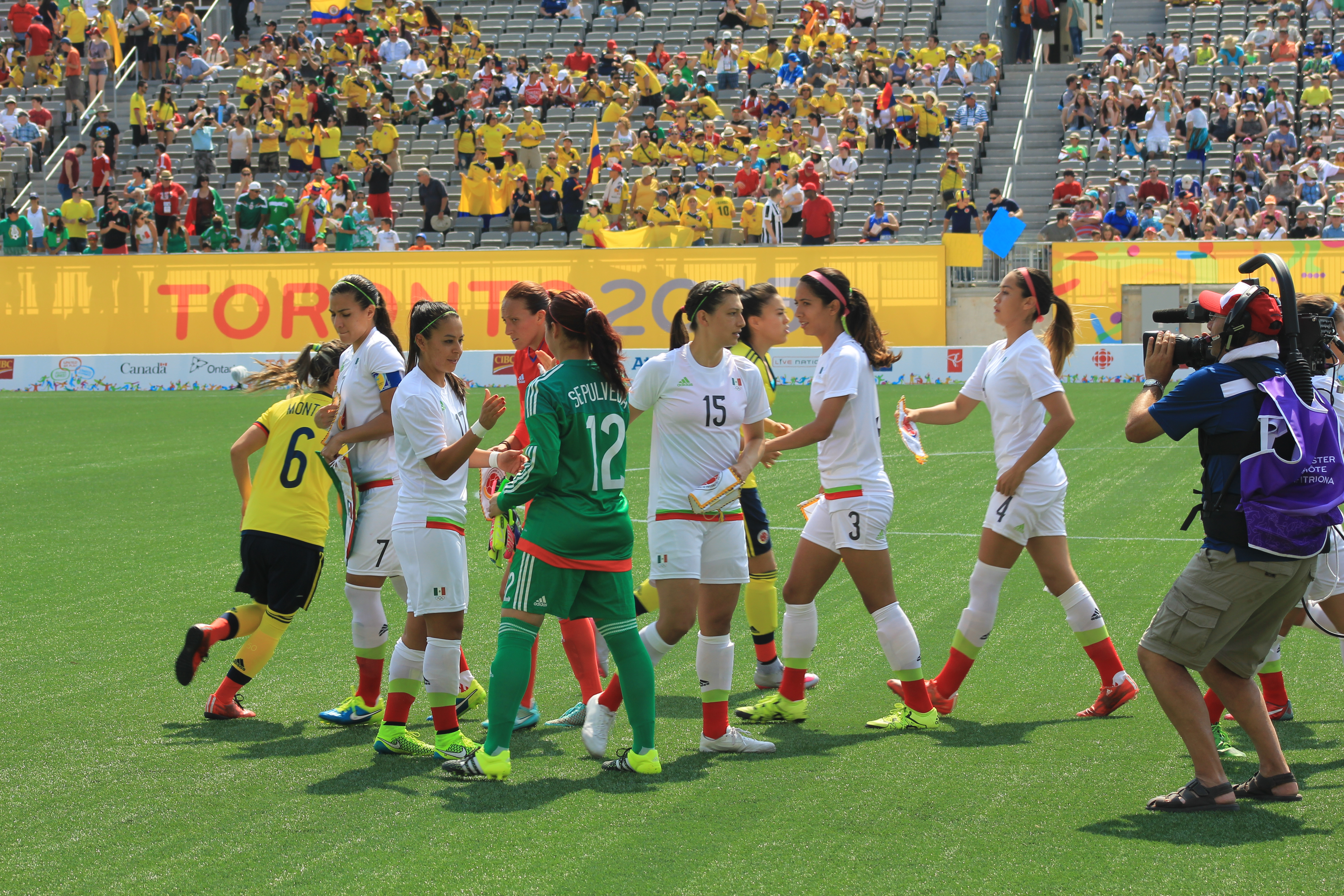
- Alvarado #15, in 2015

Personal information
- Full name: Mónica Rose Alvarado Rodríguez
- Birth name: Monica Rose Alvarado
- Date of birth: 11 January 1991 (age 35)
- Place of birth: Santa Monica, California, U.S.
- Height: 1.65 m (5 ft 5 in)
- Position: Centre-back

College career
Years	Team	Apps	(Gls)
2009–2010	Mississippi State	34	(2)
2011–2012	TCU		

Senior career*
Years	Team	Apps	(Gls)
2016–2017	FC Dallas	4	(0)
2018	Texas Spurs FC		(0)
2020–2022	Pachuca	76	(7)
2023–2024	Tijuana	57	(9)
2025–2026	UNAM	32	(0)

International career^{‡}
2009–2015	Mexico	21	(0)
- * Club domestic league appearances and goals as of 31 January 2026 ‡ National team caps and goals as of 10:34, 18 June 2015 (UTC)

Mónica Rose Alvarado Rodríguez (born 11 January 1991) is a professional footballer who plays as a center-back. Born in the United States, she represented Mexico at international level. Mainly a centre-back, she can also operate as a midfielder.

She was a member of the Mexico national team for the FIFA Women's World Cup squads in 2011 and 2015. She also played the 2010 U-20 World Cup.
