= Stephanie Ribeiro =

American-born Portuguese footballer (born 1994)

Personal information
- Full name: Stephanie Mariana Ribeiro
- Date of birth: 10 June 1994 (age 32)
- Place of birth: Pawtucket, Rhode Island, U.S.
- Height: 1.70 m (5 ft 7 in)
- Position: Striker

Team information
- Current team: UNAM
- Number: 7

College career
Years	Team	Apps	(Gls)
2012–2016	UConn Huskies	85	(38)

Senior career*
Years	Team	Apps	(Gls)
2018	IK Grand Bodø	10	(4)
2019	Avaldsnes IL	0	(0)
2020	Þróttur	15	(10)
2021	HB Køge	12	(5)
2021	América	11	(1)
2022–	UNAM	102	(71)

International career^{‡}
2024–	Portugal	3	(1)
- * Club domestic league appearances and goals as of 31 January 2026 ‡ National team caps and goals as of 18 June 2025

Stephanie Mariana Ribeiro (born 10 June 1994) is a professional footballer who plays as a forward for Liga MX Femenil club UNAM. Born in the United States, she represents Portugal at the international level.

== Early life ==
Ribeiro was born in Pawtucket, Rhode Island in the United States to a Brazilian father and a Portuguese mother. She started playing soccer at the age of four.

Ribeiro attended Cumberland High School in Cumberland, Rhode Island, where she was a girls' soccer team member and considered one of their best players. She scored more than 100 goals during her time in high school and received multiple accolades

== College career ==
Ribeiro played college soccer with the UConn Huskies women's soccer team from 2012 to 2016, making 85 appearances and scoring 38 goals.

== Club career ==
Ribeiro has played football professionally in Iceland, Denmark, Norway and Mexico. Previous to her professional career, she worked as a youth soccer coach.

=== Club América (2021) ===
Ribeiro signed with Liga MX Femenil side Club América on 18 July 2021, becoming the first foreign player to play for the club. Her stay with América was short, as she exited the club after making 11 appearances and scoring one goal in a single tournament.

=== UNAM (2022–present) ===
Ribeiro signed with UNAM on 31 December 2021.

== Style of play ==
Ribeiro mainly operates as a striker and has described herself as "My core competencies are clearly scoring goals. At the same time, I will always try to set my teammates up for opportunities, while I also don't mind working defensively and running a lot of meters".

== International career ==
Ribeiro was called for the first time to the Portugal women's national football team on 20 May 2024 for two UEFA Women's Euro 2025 qualifying matches against Northern Ireland, but did not play in either of those games. She was called once again for Portugal’s final two UEFA Women's Euro 2025 qualifying games against Bosnia and Herzegovina and Malta. Ribeiro made her international debut on 16 July 2024 as part of Portugal’s starting lineup for the match against Malta. She also scored her first goal with Portugal during the match against Malta.

== Career statistics ==
=== International goals ===
No.	Date	Venue	Opponent	Score	Result	Competition
1.	16 July 2024	Estádio Dr. Magalhães Pessoa	Malta	2–0	3–1	UEFA Women's Euro 2025 qualifying

== Personal life ==
Ribeiro is of Brazilian and Portuguese descent and speaks Portuguese.

== Honours ==
HB Köge

- Elitedivisionen: 2020–21
