= Kimberli Gómez =

Mexican footballer (born 2004)

Personal information
- Full name: Kimberli Anahí Gómez Castillo
- Date of birth: 13 April 2004 (age 22)
- Place of birth: Colima City, Colima, Mexico
- Height: 1.57 m (5 ft 2 in)
- Position: Defensive midfielder

Team information
- Current team: Santos Laguna
- Number: 13

Senior career*
Years	Team	Apps	(Gls)
2020–2024	UNAM	57	(10)
2024–	Santos Laguna	64	(5)
- * Club domestic league appearances and goals as of 6 February 2026 ‡ National team caps and goals as of 12 March 2022

Kimberli Anahí Gómez Castillo (born 13 April 2004) is a Mexican professional footballer who plays as a Defensive midfielder for Liga MX Femenil side Santos Laguna.

== Career ==
In 2020, she started her career in UNAM. In 2024, she was transferred to Santos Laguna.
