= Juan Manuel Romo =

Mexican football manager

Personal information
- Full name: Juan Manuel Romo Gómez
- Date of birth: 29 July 1979 (age 47)
- Place of birth: Guadalajara, Jalisco, Mexico
- Height: 1.82 m (6 ft 0 in)

Managerial career
- Years: Team
- 2008: Agaveros del Arenal
- 2008: Héroes de Caborca
- 2009–2010: Deportivo Guamúchil
- 2010–2011: Héroes de Caborca
- 2012: Nuevos Valores de Occidente
- 2013: Selección Tercera División
- 2013–2014: Chiapas Reserves and Academy
- 2015: Selección Tercera División
- 2015–2016: Atlético San Luis Premier
- 2016–2022: Tijuana Reserves and Academy
- 2022–2025: Tijuana (women)

Juan Manuel Romo Gómez (born 29 July 1979) is a Mexican manager who has been the manager for Tijuana (women) since 2022.

== Coaching career ==
Romo started his coaching career managing several teams of the Liga TDP, from 2008 to 2013. In 2013, Romo joined the Chiapas Reserves and Academy. In 2015, Romo was named the coach for Atlético San Luis Premier. In 2016, he joined the Tijuana Reserves and Academy. In 2022, Romo was appointed as manager of Tijuana in the Liga MX Femenil.
