= Campeón de Campeonas =

- Organiser(s): Mexican Football Federation
- Founded: 2021; 5 years ago
- Region: Mexico
- Teams: 2
- Current champions: América (1st title)
- Most championships: Tigres UANL (3 titles)

Campeón de Campeonas is an association football competition in Mexico and the domestic super cup between the Liga Femenil champions of the Apertura and Clausura tournaments. Founded in 2021, it is the women’s version of the Campeón de Campeones.

The current champion is Club América who defeated Tigres UANL on penalties 4–3 on 26 July 2026 to win its first title.

== History ==
On 24 May 2021, the Liga MX Owners Assembly made official the creation of the Campeón de Campeonas ("Champion of Women's Champions"), a tournament between the two winning teams of the season's tournaments made with the goal of premiering the best team in all the annual cycle of Mexican women's football.

The first edition of this trophy, 2020-21, did not have a match to celebrate because Tigres UANL was crowned champion of both the 2020 Torneo Guard1anes and the 2021 Torneo Clausura, so the Campeón de Campeonas was automatically awarded to them. The edition that played the trophy of the 2021-22 season, having had different champions, was the first to be played on the field for this title, with the Guadalajara team defeating Monterrey in the penalty shootout.

This trophy was initially held in a series with home and away matches. However, for the 2024-25 edition of this trophy, it was decided that the format would be changed to a single match at a neutral field in the United States, this being Toyota Field, in San Antonio, Texas.

Similarly to the Campeón de Campeones, if a team wins both the Apertura and Clausura seasons, the team is automatically awarded the Campeón de Campeonas trophy. To date this has occurred once, Tigres in 2021 for winning the Apertura 2020 and Clausura 2021.

== Results ==
Finals
Ed.	Year	League champions (Apertura)	Results	League champions (Clausura)
1	2021	Tigres UANL - Trophy awarded automatically for winning both tournaments		
2	2022	Monterrey	1–1; 0–0 (0–3 p)	Guadalajara
3	2023	Tigres UANL	2–0; 1–0	América
4	2024	Tigres UANL	0–0; 3–2	Monterrey
5	2025	Pachuca	1–0	Monterrey
6	2026	América	1–1 (4–3 p)	Tigres UANL

== Performances ==
Performance by club
Club	Titles	Runners-up	Winning editions
Tigres UANL	3	0	2021, 2023, 2024
América	1	1	2026
Pachuca	1	0	2025
Guadalajara	1	0	2022
Monterrey	0	3	–

== See also ==
- Football in Mexico
- Mexican Football Federation
- Liga MX
- Liga MX Femenil
- Copa MX
- Supercopa MX
- Campeones Cup
- Campeón de Campeones
