= 2025 in Japanese football =

Football in Japan
- Season: 2025

Men's football
- J1 League: Kashima Antlers
- J2 League: Mito HollyHock
- J3 League: Tochigi City FC
- JFL: Honda FC
- Emperor's Cup: Machida Zelvia
- JL Cup: Sanfrecce Hiroshima
- Super Cup: Sanfrecce Hiroshima

Women's football
- Nadeshiko Division 1: NGU Loveledge Nagoya
- Nadeshiko Division 2: Vonds Ichihara

This article summarizes Japanese football in the 2025 season.

== National teams ==
=== Men's ===
==== Senior ====
| 20 March FIFA World Cup qualification 3R | Japan | 2–0 | Bahrain | Saitama, Japan |
| 19:35 UTC+9 | Kamada 66'; Kubo 87' | Report | | Stadium: Saitama Stadium 2002; Attendance: 58,137; Referee: Abdulrahman Al-Jassim (Qatar) |

| 25 March FIFA World Cup qualification 3R | Japan | 0–0 | Saudi Arabia | Saitama, Japan |
| 19:35 UTC+9 | | Report | | Stadium: Saitama Stadium 2002; Attendance: 58,003; Referee: Ahmed Al-Ali (Kuwait) |

| 5 June FIFA World Cup qualification 3R | Australia | 1–0 | Japan | Perth, Australia |
| 19:10 UTC+8 | Behich 90' | Report | | Stadium: Perth Stadium; Attendance: 57,226; Referee: Qasim Al-Hatmi (Oman) |

| 10 June FIFA World Cup qualification 3R | Japan | 6–0 | Indonesia | Suita, Japan |
| 19:35 UTC+9 | Kamada 15', 45+6'; Kubo 19'; Morishita 55'; Machino 58'; Hosoya 80' | Report | | Stadium: Suita City Football Stadium; Attendance: 33,661; Referee: Kim Jong-hyeok (South Korea) |

| 8 July EAFF E-1 Championship | Japan | 6–1 | Hong Kong | Yongin, South Korea |
| 19:24 UTC+9 | Germain 4', 10', 22', 26'; Inagaki 20'; Nakamura 90+4' | Report | Orr 59' | Stadium: Yongin Mireu Stadium; Attendance: 687; Referee: Thoriq Alkatiri (Indonesia) |

| 12 July EAFF E-1 Championship | Japan | 2–0 | China | Yongin, South Korea |
| 19:24 UTC+9 | Hosoya 11'; Mochizuki 63' | Report | | Stadium: Yongin Mireu Stadium; Attendance: 1,661; Referee: Sivakorn Pu-udom (Thailand) |

| 15 July EAFF E-1 Championship | South Korea | 0–1 | Japan | Yongin, South Korea |
| 19:24 UTC+9 | | Report | Germain 8' | Stadium: Yongin Mireu Stadium; Attendance: 18,418; Referee: Tuan Yaasin (Malaysia) |

| 6 September Friendly | Mexico | 0–0 | Japan | Oakland, United States |
| 19:00 UTC−7 | Montes (red card) 90+2' | Report | | Stadium: Oakland Coliseum; Attendance: 45,278; Referee: Rubiel Vazquéz (United States) |

| 9 September Friendly | United States | 2–0 | Japan | Columbus, United States |
| 19:30 UTC−4 | Zendejas 30'; Balogun 64' | Report | | Stadium: Lower.com Field; Attendance: 20,192; Referee: Bryan Lopez (Guatemala) |

| 10 October Kirin Challenge Cup | Japan | 2–2 | Paraguay | Suita, Japan |
| 19:20 UTC+9 | Ogawa 26'; Ueda 90+4' | Report | Almirón 20'; D. Gómez 64' | Stadium: Suita City Football Stadium; Attendance: 34,169; Referee: Ko Hyung-jin (South Korea) |

| 14 October Kirin Challenge Cup | Japan | 3–2 | Brazil | Chōfu, Japan |
| 19:30 UTC+9 | Minamino 52'; Nakamura 62'; Ueda 71' | Report | Paulo Henrique 26'; Martinelli 32' | Stadium: Ajinomoto Stadium; Attendance: 44,920; Referee: Kim Jong-hyeok (South Korea) |

| 14 November Kirin Challenge Cup | Japan | 2–0 | Ghana | Toyota, Japan |
| 19:20 UTC+9 | Minamino 16'; Dōan 60' | Report | | Stadium: Toyota Stadium; Attendance: 40,030; Referee: Ben Abraham (Australia) |

| 18 November Kirin Challenge Cup | Japan | 3–0 | Bolivia | Tokyo, Japan |
| 19:15 UTC+9 | Kamada 4'; Machino 72'; Nakamura 78' | Report | | Stadium: Japan National Stadium; Attendance: 53,508; Referee: Fu Ming (China) |

- Fixtures and Results (2025) – JFA.jp

==== U-22 ====
| 25 July Mirabror Usmanov Memorial Cup | Saudi Arabia | 1–5 | Japan | Tashkent, Uzbekistan |
| 20:00 UTC+5 | Khadhari 28' | Report | Nwadike 6'; Yada 45+3'; Inoue 56'; Shinkawa 90+1'; Yasuno 90+5' | Stadium: JAR Stadium |

| 28 July Mirabror Usmanov Memorial Cup | Uzbekistan | 0–2 | Japan | Tashkent, Uzbekistan |
| 20:00 UTC+5 | | Report | Shimamoto 61'; Inoue 88' | Stadium: JAR Stadium |

==== U-23 ====
| 3 September 2026 AFC U-23 Asian Cup qual. | Japan | 3–0 | Afghanistan | Yangon, Myanmar |
| 19:00 UTC+6:30 | Shinkawa 8'; Nawata 42'; Goto 90+4' | | | Stadium: Thuwunna Stadium; Attendance: 340; Referee: Tuan Yaasin (Malaysia) |

| 6 September 2026 AFC U-23 Asian Cup qual. | Myanmar | 1–2 | Japan | Thuwunna Stadium, Yangon |
| 16:00 UTC+6:30 | Swan Htet 80' | | Okabe 52'; Nawata 90+2' (pen.) | Attendance: 7,300; Referee: Veronika Bernatskaia (Kyrgyzstan) |

| 9 September 2026 AFC U-23 Asian Cup qual. | Japan | 6–1 | Kuwait | Thuwunna Stadium, Yangon |
| 19:00 UTC+6:30 | Kawai 19', 40', 56'; Nwadike 32' (pen.); Yada 42'; Goto 90+4' | | Boodai 10' | Attendance: 85; Referee: Tuan Yaasin (Malaysia) |

- Fixtures & Results (2025)

==== U-20 ====
| 7 February Friendly | Japan | 2–1 | Australia | Chiba |
| 18:50 UTC+9 | Sato 11', 18' | | Jovanovic 39' | Stadium: JFA YUME Field |

| 14 February 2025 AFC U-20 Asian Cup GS | Japan | 3–0 | Thailand | Shenzhen, China |
| 17:15 UTC+8 | Ishii 14'; Ichihara 33' (pen.); Sato 69' | Report | | Stadium: Shenzhen Youth Football Training Base Pitch No.1; Attendance: 184; Referee: Abdulhadi Al-Rowaily (Qatar) |

| 17 February 2025 AFC U-20 Asian Cup GS | Syria | 2–2 | Japan | Shenzhen, China |
| 15:00 UTC+8 | Al-Mustafa 10'; Soufi 33' | Report | Ozeki 24'; Takaoka 85' | Stadium: Longhua Cultural and Sports Center; Attendance: 468; Referee: Ahmed Eisa Darwish (United Arab Emirates) |

| 20 February 2025 AFC U-20 Asian Cup GS | Japan | 1–1 | South Korea | Shenzhen, China |
| 15:00 UTC+8 | Kanda 28' | Report | Kim Tae-won 90+1' | Stadium: Shenzhen Youth Football Training Base Pitch No.1; Attendance: 277; Referee: Thoriq Alkatiri (Indonesia) |

| 23 February 2025 AFC U-20 Asian Cup QF | Iran | 1–1 (a.e.t.) (3–4 p) | Japan | Shenzhen, China |
| 19:30 UTC+8 | Ghandipour 5' | Report | Ogura 30' | Stadium: Shenzhen Youth Football Training Base Pitch No.1; Attendance: 1,826; Referee: Abdullah Jamali (Kuwait) |
| | Penalties |
| | Aali (penalty missed); Shahrabadi (penalty missed); Shakouri (penalty scored); Hassani (penalty scored); Andarz (penalty scored) | | (penalty scored) Nakajima; (penalty scored) Takaoka; (penalty missed) Takahashi; (penalty scored) Sato; (penalty scored) Ichihara |

| 26 February 2025 AFC U-20 Asian Cup SF | Australia | 2–0 | Japan | Shenzhen, China |
| 19:30 UTC+8 | Toure 49'; Pearman 67' | Report | | Stadium: Shenzhen Youth Football Training Base Pitch No.1; Attendance: 1,363; Referee: Abdulhadi Al-Rowaily (Qatar) |

| 20 March Friendly | France | 1–3 | Japan | Benidorm, Spain |
| 16:00 UTC+1 | Kroupi 13' | Report | Goto 24', 56'; Ishii 35' | Stadium: Estadio Municipal Guillermo Amor |

| 24 March Friendly | Japan | 1–1 | United States | Benidorm, Spain |
| 17:00 UTC+1 | Ozeki 23' | Report | Tsakiris 55' | Stadium: Estadio Municipal Guillermo Amor |

| 4 June Maurice Revello Tournament GS | Congo | 0–2 | Japan | Fos-sur-Mer, France |
| 14:00 UTC+2 | | Report | Kanda 56', 58' | Stadium: Stade Parsemain; Referee: Khaled Al-Ahmari (Saudi Arabia) |

| 7 June Maurice Revello Tournament GS | Japan | 1–1 (3–4 p) | Mexico | Avignon, France |
| 14:00 UTC+2 | Nishihara 32' | Report | Camberos 71' | Stadium: Parc des Sports; Referee: Alexandra Collin (France) |
| | Penalties |
| | Michiwaki (penalty missed); Ozeki (penalty scored); Hiraga (penalty missed); Ishiwatari (penalty scored); Ichihara (penalty scored) | | (penalty scored) Padilla; (penalty scored) Jurado; (penalty missed) Virgen; (penalty scored) Jiménez; (penalty scored) Camberos |

| 10 June Maurice Revello Tournament GS | Denmark | 3–0 | Japan | Aubagne, France |
| 14:00 UTC+2 | Obi 5'; Nakamura 78' (o.g.); Simmelhack 85' | Report | | Stadium: Stade de Lattre-de-Tassigny; Referee: Alexandra Collin (France) |

| 14 June Maurice Revello Tournament 5th p.p. | Mali | 3–2 | Japan | Noves, France |
| 17:00 UTC+2 | Sidibé 11'; Thiero 31'; Makalou 60' | | Mori 51'; Ishii 86' | Stadium: Stade du Moulin; Referee: Khaled Al-Ahmari (Saudi Arabia) |

| 27 September FIFA U-20 World Cup | Japan | v | Egypt | Santiago, Chile |
| 17:00 UTC−3 | | Report | | Stadium: Estadio Nacional Julio Martínez Prádanos |

| 30 September FIFA U-20 World Cup | Chile | v | Japan | Santiago, Chile |
| 20:00 UTC−3 | | Report | | Stadium: Estadio Nacional Julio Martínez Prádanos |

| 3 October FIFA U-20 World Cup | New Zealand | v | Japan | Valparaíso, Chile |
| 20:00 UTC−3 | | Report | | Stadium: Estadio Elías Figueroa Brander |

- Fixtures & Results (U-20 2025), JFA.jp

==== U-18 ====
| 1 June UEFA Friendship Cup GS | Portugal | 1–1 (3–4 p) | Japan | Nyon, Switzerland |
| 16:00 UTC+2 | Flávio Gonçalves 34' (pen.) | | Nakayama 64' | Stadium: Colovray Sports Centre; Referee: Maxime Odiet (Switzerland) |

| 4 June UEFA Friendship Cup GS | Japan | 3–3 (1–3 p) | Senegal | Nyon, Switzerland |
| 16:00 UTC+2 | Onishi 8'; Tanaka 15'; Nakatsumi 28' | | Kandé 27'; Cissé 55'; Sy 63' | Stadium: Colovray Sports Centre; Referee: Jonathan Jaussi (Switzerland) |

| 7 June UEFA Friendship Cup GS | Japan | 4–1 | Uruguay | Nyon, Switzerland |
| 10:30 UTC+2 | ? 18' (o.g.); Wada 70'; Onishi 80'; Nakayama 83' | Report | Domínguez 86' | Stadium: Colovray Sports Centre |

| 10 June UEFA Friendship Cup 3rd place match | France | 3–0 | Japan | Nyon, Switzerland |
| 14:00 UTC+2 | Coulibaly 21'; Bakola 69'; Vaz 82' | Report | | Stadium: Colovray Sports Centre |

- Fixtures & Results (U-18 2025), JFA.jp

==== U-17 ====
| 17 February Friendly | Cerro Porteño (Paraguay) | 0–1 | Japan | Ypané, Paraguay |
| 07:30 UTC−3 | | Report | Minato Yoshida 47' | Stadium: Parque Azulgrana |

| 19 February Friendly | Paraguay | 2–3 | Japan | Ypané, Paraguay |
| 18:15 UTC−3 | Pedro Villalba 26', 37' | Report | Yuito Kamo 6'; Hiroto Asada 68', 90+5' | Stadium: CARFEM |

| 21 February Friendly | Paraguay | 0–3 | Japan | Ypané, Paraguay |
| 18:00 UTC−3 | | Report | Mibuki Kasai 51', 63'; Yuzuki Kobayashi 88' | Stadium: CARFEM |

| 4 April 2025 AFC U-17 Asian Cup GS | Japan | 4–1 | United Arab Emirates | Taif, Saudi Arabia |
| 20:15 UTC+3 | Minato Yoshida 3', 15'; Yuito Kamo 34'; Hiroto Asada 83' | Report | Faysal Mohammed 71' | Stadium: King Fahd Sports City; Referee: Faisal Al-Balawi (Saudi Arabia) |

| 7 April 2025 AFC U-17 Asian Cup GS | Vietnam | 1–1 | Japan | Taif, Saudi Arabia |
| 18:00 UTC+3 | Trần Gia Bảo 90+6' (pen.) | Report | Minato Yoshida 13' | Stadium: Okadh Sport Club Stadium; Referee: Morteza Mansourian (Iran) |

| 10 April 2025 AFC U-17 Asian Cup GS | Japan | 2–3 | Australia | Taif, Saudi Arabia |
| 18:00 UTC+3 | Asuto Fujita 7'; Daichi Tani 86' | Report | Miles Miliner 51'; Max Anastasio 71'; Alexander Garbowski 74' | Stadium: Okadh Sport Club Stadium; Referee: Dong Fangyu (China) |

| 13 April 2025 AFC U-17 Asian Cup QF | Japan | 2–2 (2–3 p) | Saudi Arabia | Taif, Saudi Arabia |
| 17:00 UTC+3 | Taiga Seguchi 9' (pen.); Hiroto Asada 72' | Report | Abu Baker Saeed 17' (pen.); Sabri Dahal 37' | Stadium: Okadh Sport Club Stadium; Referee: Daniel Elder (Australia) |
| | Penalties |
| | Hiroto Asada (penalty scored); Minato Yoshida (penalty scored); Yuito Kamo (penalty missed); Shota Fujii (penalty missed); Ryota Hariu (penalty missed) | | (penalty scored) Nasser Al-Fihani; (penalty scored) Yazeed Al-Dosari; (penalty missed) Thari Saeed; (penalty scored) Maher Tawashi |

| 5 June Friendly | Canada | 1–4 | Japan | Valencia, Spain |
| 12:30 UTC+2 | ? 54' | Report | Minato Yoshida 14', 68'; Maki Kitahara 21'; Ryota Seo 89' | Stadium: Oliva Nova Sports Center |

| 6 June Friendly | Morocco | 0–2 | Japan | La Nucia, Spain |
| 12:30 UTC+2 | | Report | Hiroto Asada 7'; Ryota Seo 50' | Stadium: Estadi Olímpic Camilo Cano |

| 8 June Friendly | Sweden | 1–0 | Japan | Valencia, Spain |
| 11:00 UTC+2 | Ahmed Saeed 16' | Report | | Stadium: Oliva Nova Sports Center |

| 10 June Friendly | United States | 3–0 | Japan | Valencia, Spain |
| 12:00 UTC+2 | ? 9', 43', 59' | Report | | Stadium: Oliva Nova Sports Center |

| 3 September Tournoi de Limoges | Japan | 1–0 | Portugal | Limoges, France |
| 15:00 UTC+2 | Ryota Seo 9' | Report | | Stadium: Stade de Beaublanc |

| 5 September Tournoi de Limoges | Saudi Arabia | 1–3 | Japan | Limoges, France |
| 15:00 UTC+2 | Goal 35' | Report | Hiroto Asada 20'; Daichi Tani 57'; Simon Yu Mendy 72' | Stadium: Stade de Beaublanc |

| 7 September Tournoi de Limoges | France | 1–1 (5–4 p) | Japan | Limoges, France |
| 18:00 UTC+2 | Goal 13' | Report | Minato Yoshida 50' | Stadium: Stade de Beaublanc |

| 11 September IYS in Niigata | Japan | 0–1 | Wales | Shibata |
| 15:00 UTC+9 | | Report | Goal 67' | Stadium: Green Stadium Shibata |

| 13 September IYS in Niigata | Niigata U-17 Selection (Japan) | 2–1 | Japan | Shibata |
| 15:00 UTC+9 | Goal 15'; Goal 82' | Report | Kakeru Saito 89' | Stadium: Green Stadium Shibata |

| 15 September IYS in Niigata | Japan | 4–0 | Australia | Niigata |
| 15:00 UTC+9 | Kento Nishioka 52'; Kakeru Saito 55'; Ryoma Tsuneyoshi 62'; Koki Kurahashi 90' | Report | | Stadium: Denka Big Swan Stadium |

| 3 November FIFA U-17 World Cup | Japan | 2–0 | Morocco | Al-Rayyan, Qatar |
| 16:30 | Taiga Seguchi 57'; Daigo Hirashima 90+8' | Report | | Stadium: Aspire Zone; Referee: Andrea Colombo (Italy) |

| 6 November FIFA U-17 World Cup | Japan | 0–0 | New Caledonia | Al-Rayyan, Qatar |
| 16:00 | | Report | | Stadium: Aspire Zone; Referee: Kwinsi Williams (Trinidad and Tobago) |

| 9 November FIFA U-17 World Cup | Portugal | 1–2 | Japan | Al-Rayyan, Qatar |
| 16:30 | Zeega 80' | Report | Takeshi Wada 35'; Taiga Seguchi 45' | Stadium: Aspire Zone; Referee: Fernando Véjar (Chile) |

| 15 November FIFA U-17 World Cup | Japan | 3–0 | South Africa | Al-Rayyan, Qatar |
| 16:30 | Hiroto Asada 48'; Minato Yoshida 59'; Shota Fujii 72' | Report | | Stadium: Aspire Zone; Referee: Steven Madrigal (Costa Rica) |

| 18 November FIFA U-17 World Cup | North Korea | 1–1 (4–5 p) | Japan | Al-Rayyan, Qatar |
| 18:15 | Ri Hyok-gwang 67' | Report | McGhee 6' | Stadium: Aspire Zone; Referee: Hamza El Fariq (Morocco) |
| | Penalties |
| | Ri Hyok-gwang (penalty scored); Han Il-bok (penalty missed); Choe Chung-hyok (penalty scored); Ri Kang-rim (penalty scored); Kim Yu-jin (penalty scored) | | (penalty scored) Yoshida; (penalty scored) Motosuna; (penalty scored) Seguchi; (penalty scored) Hirashima; (penalty scored) Asada |

| 21 November FIFA U-17 World Cup | Austria | 1–0 | Japan | Al-Rayyan, Qatar |
| 15:30 | Moser 49' | Report | | Stadium: Aspire Zone; Referee: Paulo Zanovelli (Brazil) |

- Fixtures & Results (U-17 2025), JFA.jp

==== U-16 ====
| 13 February Algarve Cup | Germany | 0–0 | Japan | Vila Real de Santo António, Portugal |
| 15:00 UTC+3 | | Report | | Stadium: Estádio Municipal de Vila Real de Santo António |

| 15 February Algarve Cup | Portugal | 1–1 | Japan | Vila Real de Santo António, Portugal |
| 12:00 UTC+3 | Sevastian Belov 78' | Report | Kyoya Tatsuno 86' | Stadium: Estádio Municipal de Vila Real de Santo António |

| 18 February Algarve Cup | Netherlands | 1–3 | Japan | Vila Real de Santo António, Portugal |
| 12:00 UTC+3 | Jeshurun Simeon 85' | Report | Kyoya Tatsuno 6'; Masaki Koyama 65'; Eito Takaki 74' | Stadium: Estádio Municipal de Vila Real de Santo António |

| 15 April Montaigu Tournament GS | Japan | 2–3 | England | Les Herbiers, France |
| 18:30 UTC+2 | Eito Takaki 40'; Tafuku Satomi 45' | Report | Mahdi Nicoll-Jazuli 35', 52'; Ryan Kavuma-McQueen 69' | Stadium: Stade de la Salmondiere |

| 17 April Montaigu Tournament GS | Japan | 1–3 | Portugal | Les Herbiers, France |
| 18:30 UTC+2 | Kyoya Tatsuno 17' | Report | Diogo Coelho 60'; Filipe Silva 66'; Afonso Ferreirinha 76' | Stadium: Stade de la Salmondiere |

| 19 April Montaigu Tournament GS | Mexico | 0–1 | Japan | Les Herbiers, France |
| 18:00 UTC+2 | | Report | Sora Iwatsuchi 14' | Stadium: Stade de la Salmondiere |

| 21 April Montaigu Tournament 5th/6th Plac. | Cameroon | 1–1 (3–5 p) | Japan | La Châtaigneraie, France |
| 10:30 UTC+2 | Abeng Togolo 80+4' | Report | Kyoya Tatsuno 31' | Stadium: Stade Claude Betard |

| 4 June U-16 International Dream Cup | Japan | 1–0 | Colombia | Hirono |
| 15:00 UTC+9 | Tafuku Satomi 56' | Report | | Stadium: J-Village Stadium; Attendance: 249; Referee: Ryu Mashio |

| 6 June U-16 International Dream Cup | Japan | 5–1 | Ivory Coast | Hirono |
| 15:00 UTC+9 | Chimezie Kai Ezemokwe 24'; ? 31' (o.g.); Shin Miidera 34'; Ayumu Noda 41'; Riku Hashimoto 68' | Report | Hubert Yao 55' | Stadium: J-Village Stadium; Attendance: 240; Referee: Mutsuki Takahashi |

| 8 June U-16 International Dream Cup | Japan | 2–0 | France | Hirono |
| 14:00 UTC+9 | Shin Miidera 20'; Eito Takaki 37' | Report | | Stadium: J-Village Stadium; Attendance: 1,483; Referee: Kentaro Kobayashi |

| 4 July CFA Peace Cup | China | 1–1 | Japan | Shenyang, China |
| 19:35 UTC+9 | Liang Shiyu 47' | Report | Takeshi Wada 20' | Stadium: Shenyang Urban Stadium; Attendance: 6,900; Referee: Ai Kun (China) |

| 6 July CFA Peace Cup | South Korea | 2–1 | Japan | Shenyang, China |
| 15:00 UTC+9 | Kim Ji-woo 55'; An Joo-wan 68' | Report | Eito Takaki 70' | Stadium: Shenyang Urban Stadium |

| 8 July CFA Peace Cup | Uzbekistan | 1–3 | Japan | Shenyang, China |
| 15:00 UTC+9 | Amirkhon Erkinov 23' | Report | Eito Takaki 38', 74'; Hiro Ogasawara 48' | Stadium: Shenyang Urban Stadium |

| 12 October Friendly | Uzbekistan | 1–3 | Japan | Tashkent, Uzbekistan |
| 15:00 UTC+5 | Goal 47' | Report | Nagasoe Koki 29'; Ezemuokwe Chimezie Kai 73'; Tatsuno Kyoya 90' | Stadium: Qibray Stadium |

| 14 October Friendly | Saudi Arabia | 1–1 (7–8 p) | Japan | Tashkent, Uzbekistan |
| 15:00 UTC+5 | Goal 83' | Report | Inouchi Ryotaro 15' | Stadium: Qibray Stadium |

| 16 October Friendly | Uzbekistan | 2–1 | Japan | Tashkent, Uzbekistan |
| 13:00 UTC+5 | | Report | | Stadium: Qibray Stadium |

| 14 December Friendly | Egypt | 0–0 (4–3 p) | Japan | Giza, Egypt |
| 14:00 UTC+2 | | Report | | Stadium: Egyptian National Teams Center |

| 17 December Friendly | Egypt | 1–1 (3–1 p) | Japan | Giza, Egypt |
| 14:00 UTC+2 | Goal 84' | Report | Rikuto Soma 72' | Stadium: Egyptian National Teams Center |

- Fixtures & Results (U-16 2025), JFA.jp

==== U-15 ====
| 13 May Vlatko Markovic Int. Tournament GS | Portugal | 4–1 | Japan | Sveti Martin na Muri, Croatia |
| 12:15 UTC+1 | Rafael Cabral 19', 22', 49'; Henrique Amen 73' | Report | Toa Fujisawa 80+2' | Stadium: NK Polet Sveti Martin na Muri; Referee: Jasmin Horvat (Croatia) |

| 14 May Vlatko Markovic Int. Tournament GS | England | 3–1 | Japan | Čakovec, Croatia |
| 14:45 UTC+1 | Heaven Kilwa 13'; Reggie Watson 17'; Heze Grimwade 68' | Report | Daichi Komatsu 35' | Stadium: Stadion SRC Mladost |

| 16 May Vlatko Markovic Int. Tournament GS | Japan | 6–3 | Greece | Sveti Martin na Muri, Croatia |
| 12:15 UTC+1 | Kuga Doi 13'; Haru Tsushima 23'; Kaioh Otsukoro 26'; Shin Miidera 53', 64', 80' | Report | Panagiotis Douralis 15'; Stefanos Tsantilas 23' (pen.); Athanasios Grammozis 45' | Stadium: NK Polet Sveti Martin na Muri |

| 18 May Vlatko Markovic Int. Tournament 5th-6th place | Romania | 2–0 | Japan | Ludbreg, Croatia |
| 11:15 UTC+1 | Matei Pădure 35'; Mihai Grosu 60' | Report | | Stadium: Stadion NK Podravina |

| 26 August The Gary Speed Tournament | Wales | 2–2 (7–8 p) | Japan | Colwyn Bay, Wales |
| 18:00 UTC+1 | Goal 53'; Goal 71' | Report | Yua Endo 13'; Rento Kajiyama 23' |

| 28 August The Gary Speed Tournament | Northern Ireland | 1–0 | Japan | Ruthin, Wales |
| 11:00 UTC+1 | Goal 53' | Report |

| 31 August The Gary Speed Tournament | Gibraltar | 0–6 | Japan | Ruthin, Wales |
| 11:00 UTC+1 | | Report | Shuto Jo 33'; Hayato Yairo 47', 86'; Rento Kajiyama 56'; Eita Sawaguchi 60'; Kitto Nawa 84' |

| 28 October Val-de-Marne Tournament | Netherlands | 0–3 | Japan | Paris, France |
| 14:00 UTC+1 | | Report | Haru Tsushima 19'; Kuga Doi 43'; Hayato Yairo 71' |

| 30 October Val-de-Marne Tournament | Belgium | 1–3 | Japan | Paris, France |
| 14:00 UTC+1 | | Report |

| 1 November Val-de-Marne Tournament | France | 2–0 | Japan | Paris, France |
| 16:00 UTC+1 | Goal 14'; Goal 32' | Report |

| 18 December 2025 EAFF U-15 Championship | China | 0–3 | Japan | Zhangzhou, China |
| 15:00 UTC+8 | | Report | Eita Sawaguchi 34'; Soma Iida 50'; Ren Isobe 55' | Stadium: Hooray International Football Training Base Stadium; Referee: Bai Qitao (China) |

| 20 December 2025 EAFF U-15 Championship | Hong Kong | 0–2 | Japan | Zhangzhou, China |
| 10:10 UTC+8 | | Report | Yu Nanakubo 39'; Ren Isobe 70+1' | Stadium: Hooray International Football Training Base Pitch 5 Referee: Shi Liangyi (China) |

| 22 December 2025 EAFF U-15 Championship | Japan | 0–3 | South Korea | Zhangzhou, China |
| 10:00 UTC+8 | | Report | Seongjun Myoung 20'; Woojin Jung 47', 55' | Stadium: Hooray International Football Training Base Pitch 5 |

- Fixtures & Results (U-15 2025), JFA.jp

=== Women's ===
| 20 February SheBelieves Cup | Japan | 4–0 | Australia | Houston, United States |
| 16:00 UTC−6 | Tanaka 6', 32'; Hamano 52'; Minami 75' | Report | | Stadium: Shell Energy Stadium; Attendance: 5,243 |

| 23 February SheBelieves Cup | Colombia | 1–4 | Japan | Glendale, United States |
| 13:00 UTC−7 | Caicedo 45+4' | Report (USS); Report (JFA) | Tanikawa 1'; Tanaka 8', 80' (pen.); Hamano 57' | Stadium: State Farm Stadium; Attendance: 12,624; Referee: Alex Billeter (USA) |

| 26 February SheBelieves Cup | United States | 1–2 | Japan | San Diego, United States |
| 19:30 UTC−8 | Sentnor 14' | Report | Momiki 2'; Koga 50' | Stadium: Snapdragon Stadium; Attendance: 17,188 |

| 6 April Friendly | Japan | 1–1 | Colombia | Osaka, Japan |
| 14:00 UTC+9 | Takahashi 90+4' (pen.) | Report | Torres 35' | Stadium: Yodoko Sakura Stadium; Attendance: 8,381; Referee: Oh Hyeon-jeong (South Korea) |

| 8 April Unofficial Friendly | Japan | 6–1 | Colombia | Sakai, Japan |
| | Ueki 45+3' (pen.); Matsukubo 46'; Momiki 50'; Endo 57'; Takahashi 60'; Miharu Shinjo 90' | Report | Caracas 73' | Attendance: 500 |

| 30 May Friendly | Brazil | 3–1 | Japan | São Paulo, Brazil |
| 21:30 UTC−3 | Dudinha 27', 41'; Kerolin 55' | Report | Seike 88' | Stadium: Arena Corinthians |

| 2 June Friendly | Brazil | 2–1 | Japan | São Paulo, Brazil |
| 20:00 UTC−3 | Ishikawa 54' (o.g.); Jhonson 78' | Report | Seike 46' | Stadium: Estádio Cícero de Souza Marques |

| 27 June Friendly | Spain | 3–1 | Japan | Leganés, Spain |
| 21:00 UTC+2 | Pina 44'; López 66'; Del Castillo 88' | Report | Tanaka 30' | Stadium: Butarque; Attendance: 9,458; Referee: Milica Milovanović (Serbia) |

| 9 July EAFF E-1 Football Championship | Japan | 4–0 | Chinese Taipei | Suwon, South Korea |
| 16:30 UTC+9 | Yakata 22'; Takikawa 25'; Takahashi 48'; Chen Ying-hui 70' (o.g.) | Report (EAFF); Report (JFA) | | Stadium: Suwon World Cup Stadium; Attendance: 193; Referee: Pansa Chaisanit (Thailand) |

| 13 July EAFF E-1 Football Championship | Japan | 1–1 | South Korea | Hwaseong, South Korea |
| 20:00 UTC+9 | Narumiya 37' | Report (EAFF); Report (JFA) | Jeong Da-bin 86' | Stadium: Hwaseong Sports Complex; Attendance: 1,641; Referee: Tam Ping Wun (Hong Kong) |

| 16 July EAFF E-1 Football Championship | Japan | 0–0 | China | Suwon, South Korea |
| 16:00 UTC+9 | | Report (EAFF); Report (JFA) | | Stadium: Suwon World Cup Stadium; Attendance: 323; Referee: Pansa Chaisanit (Thailand) |

| 25 October Friendly | Italy | 1–1 | Japan | Como, Italy |
| 18:15 UTC+2 | Greggi 52' | Source (JFA) | Hasegawa 64' | Stadium: Stadio Giuseppe Sinigaglia |

| 28 October Friendly | Norway | 2–0 | Japan | La Línea, Spain |
| 18:00 UTC+1 | Gaupset 28', 52' | Report | | Stadium: Estadio Municipal de La Línea; Attendance: 30; Referee: Teresa Oliveira (Portugal) |

| 29 November MS&AD Cup | Japan | 3–0 | Canada | Nagasaki, Japan |
| 15:30 UTC+9 | Tanikawa 43'; Tanaka 51'; Fujino 68' | Report | | Stadium: Peace Stadium |

| 2 December Friendly | Japan | 1–0 | Canada | Isahaya, Japan |
| | Tanaka 45' | Report | | Stadium: Transcosmos Stadium Nagasaki |

- Fixtures and Results (2025) – JFA.jp

== Club competitions ==
=== League (men) ===
==== Promotion and relegation ====
| League | Promoted to league | Relegated from league |
|---|---|---|
| J1 League | Shimizu S-Pulse ▲; Yokohama FC ▲; Fagiano Okayama ▲ | Júbilo Iwata ▼; Hokkaido Consadole Sapporo ▼; Sagan Tosu ▼ |
| J2 League | RB Omiya Ardija ▲; FC Imabari ▲; Kataller Toyama ▲ | Tochigi SC ▼; Kagoshima United ▼; Thespa Gunma ▼ |
| J3 League | Tochigi City ▲; Kochi United ▲ | YSCC Yokohama ▼; Iwate Grulla Morioka ▼ |
| Japan Football League | Asuka FC ▲ | Sony Sendai ▼ (disbanded) |

==== J.League ====
===== J1 League =====
| Pos | Team | Pld | W | D | L | GF | GA | GD | Pts | Qualification or relegation |
|---|---|---|---|---|---|---|---|---|---|---|
| 1 | Kashima Antlers (C) | 38 | 23 | 7 | 8 | 58 | 31 | +27 | 76 | Qualification for the AFC Champions League Elite league stage |
| 2 | Kashiwa Reysol | 38 | 21 | 12 | 5 | 60 | 34 | +26 | 75 | Qualification for the AFC Champions League Elite league stage |
| 3 | Kyoto Sanga | 38 | 19 | 11 | 8 | 62 | 40 | +22 | 68 | Qualification for the AFC Champions League Elite league stage |
| 4 | Sanfrecce Hiroshima | 38 | 20 | 8 | 10 | 46 | 28 | +18 | 68 | |
| 5 | Vissel Kobe | 38 | 18 | 10 | 10 | 46 | 33 | +13 | 64 | Qualification for the AFC Champions League Elite league stage (Note: Qualified as the finalists of the J1 100 Year Vision League.) |
| 6 | Machida Zelvia | 38 | 17 | 9 | 12 | 52 | 38 | +14 | 60 | Qualification for the AFC Champions League Two group stage (Note: Qualified as the 2025 Emperor's Cup winners.) |
| 7 | Urawa Red Diamonds | 38 | 16 | 11 | 11 | 45 | 39 | +6 | 59 | |
| 8 | Kawasaki Frontale | 38 | 15 | 12 | 11 | 66 | 56 | +10 | 57 | |
| 9 | Gamba Osaka | 38 | 17 | 6 | 15 | 53 | 55 | −2 | 57 | Qualification for the AFC Champions League Elite playoff round (Note: Qualified as 2025–26 AFC Champions League Two winners.) |
| 10 | Cerezo Osaka | 38 | 14 | 10 | 14 | 60 | 57 | +3 | 52 | |
| 11 | FC Tokyo | 38 | 13 | 11 | 14 | 41 | 48 | −7 | 50 | |
| 12 | Avispa Fukuoka | 38 | 12 | 12 | 14 | 34 | 38 | −4 | 48 | |
| 13 | Fagiano Okayama | 38 | 12 | 9 | 17 | 33 | 42 | −9 | 45 | |
| 14 | Shimizu S-Pulse | 38 | 11 | 11 | 16 | 41 | 51 | −10 | 44 | |
| 15 | Yokohama F. Marinos | 38 | 12 | 7 | 19 | 46 | 47 | −1 | 43 | |
| 16 | Nagoya Grampus | 38 | 11 | 10 | 17 | 44 | 56 | −12 | 43 | |
| 17 | Tokyo Verdy | 38 | 11 | 10 | 17 | 23 | 41 | −18 | 43 | |
| 18 | Yokohama FC (R) | 38 | 9 | 8 | 21 | 27 | 45 | −18 | 35 | Relegation to the J2 League |
| 19 | Shonan Bellmare (R) | 38 | 8 | 8 | 22 | 36 | 63 | −27 | 32 | Relegation to the J2 League |
| 20 | Albirex Niigata (R) | 38 | 4 | 12 | 22 | 36 | 67 | −31 | 24 | Relegation to the J2 League |

Source: JLeague.co, JLeague.jp, J.League Data Site
Rules for classification: 1) Points; 2) Goal difference; 3) Goals scored; 4) Head-to-head points; 5) Head-to-head goal difference; 6) Head-to-head goals scored; 7) Fewer disciplinary points.
(C) Champions; (R) Relegated

===== J2 League =====
| Pos | Team | Pld | W | D | L | GF | GA | GD | Pts | Promotion or relegation |
|---|---|---|---|---|---|---|---|---|---|---|
| 1 | Mito HollyHock (C, P) | 38 | 20 | 10 | 8 | 55 | 34 | +21 | 70 | Promotion to the J1 League |
| 2 | V-Varen Nagasaki (P) | 38 | 19 | 13 | 6 | 63 | 44 | +19 | 70 | Promotion to the J1 League |
| 3 | JEF United Chiba (O, P) | 38 | 20 | 9 | 9 | 56 | 34 | +22 | 69 | Qualification for the promotion play-offs |
| 4 | Tokushima Vortis | 38 | 18 | 11 | 9 | 45 | 24 | +21 | 65 | Qualification for the promotion play-offs |
| 5 | Júbilo Iwata | 38 | 19 | 7 | 12 | 59 | 51 | +8 | 64 | Qualification for the promotion play-offs |
| 6 | RB Omiya Ardija | 38 | 18 | 9 | 11 | 60 | 39 | +21 | 63 | Qualification for the promotion play-offs |
| 7 | Vegalta Sendai | 38 | 16 | 14 | 8 | 47 | 36 | +11 | 62 | |
| 8 | Sagan Tosu | 38 | 16 | 10 | 12 | 46 | 43 | +3 | 58 | |
| 9 | Iwaki FC | 38 | 15 | 11 | 12 | 55 | 44 | +11 | 56 | |
| 10 | Montedio Yamagata | 38 | 15 | 8 | 15 | 58 | 54 | +4 | 53 | |
| 11 | FC Imabari | 38 | 13 | 14 | 11 | 46 | 46 | 0 | 53 | |
| 12 | Hokkaido Consadole Sapporo | 38 | 16 | 5 | 17 | 50 | 63 | −13 | 53 | |
| 13 | Ventforet Kofu | 38 | 11 | 11 | 16 | 37 | 45 | −8 | 44 | |
| 14 | Blaublitz Akita | 38 | 11 | 10 | 17 | 43 | 59 | −16 | 43 | |
| 15 | Fujieda MYFC | 38 | 9 | 12 | 17 | 41 | 50 | −9 | 39 | |
| 16 | Oita Trinita | 38 | 8 | 14 | 16 | 27 | 44 | −17 | 38 | |
| 17 | Kataller Toyama | 38 | 9 | 10 | 19 | 34 | 49 | −15 | 37 | |
| 18 | Roasso Kumamoto (R) | 38 | 9 | 10 | 19 | 41 | 57 | −16 | 37 | Relegation to the J3 League |
| 19 | Renofa Yamaguchi (R) | 38 | 7 | 15 | 16 | 36 | 47 | −11 | 36 | Relegation to the J3 League |
| 20 | Ehime FC (R) | 38 | 3 | 13 | 22 | 35 | 71 | −36 | 22 | Relegation to the J3 League |

Source: Meiji Yasuda J2 League, J.League Data Site
Rules for classification: 1) Points; 2) Goal difference; 3) Goals scored; 4) Head-to-head points; 5) Head-to-head goal difference; 6) Head-to-head goal scored; 7) Fair-play points.
(C) Champions; (O) Play-off winners; (P) Promoted; (R) Relegated

===== J3 League =====
| Pos | Team | Pld | W | D | L | GF | GA | GD | Pts | Promotion or relegation |
|---|---|---|---|---|---|---|---|---|---|---|
| 1 | Tochigi City FC (C, P) | 38 | 23 | 8 | 7 | 69 | 37 | +32 | 77 | Promotion to the J2 League |
| 2 | Vanraure Hachinohe (P) | 38 | 21 | 9 | 8 | 46 | 23 | +23 | 72 | Promotion to the J2 League |
| 3 | FC Osaka | 38 | 21 | 8 | 9 | 55 | 33 | +22 | 71 | Qualification for the promotion play-offs |
| 4 | Tegevajaro Miyazaki (O, P) | 38 | 19 | 10 | 9 | 61 | 45 | +16 | 67 | Qualification for the promotion play-offs |
| 5 | Kagoshima United | 38 | 18 | 12 | 8 | 69 | 44 | +25 | 66 | Qualification for the promotion play-offs |
| 6 | Zweigen Kanazawa | 38 | 18 | 5 | 15 | 53 | 45 | +8 | 59 | Qualification for the promotion play-offs |
| 7 | Tochigi SC | 38 | 17 | 7 | 14 | 42 | 36 | +6 | 58 | |
| 8 | Giravanz Kitakyushu | 38 | 17 | 5 | 16 | 46 | 41 | +5 | 56 | |
| 9 | Nara Club | 38 | 15 | 11 | 12 | 50 | 46 | +4 | 56 | |
| 10 | Fukushima United | 38 | 16 | 8 | 14 | 60 | 67 | −7 | 56 | |
| 11 | Gainare Tottori | 38 | 15 | 6 | 17 | 44 | 49 | −5 | 51 | |
| 12 | SC Sagamihara | 38 | 13 | 11 | 14 | 38 | 50 | −12 | 50 | |
| 13 | FC Gifu | 38 | 13 | 8 | 17 | 52 | 60 | −8 | 47 | |
| 14 | Thespa Gunma | 38 | 12 | 10 | 16 | 56 | 59 | −3 | 46 | |
| 15 | Matsumoto Yamaga | 38 | 11 | 10 | 17 | 41 | 50 | −9 | 43 | |
| 16 | Ryukyu Okinawa | 38 | 10 | 10 | 18 | 41 | 57 | −16 | 40 | |
| 17 | Kamatamare Sanuki | 38 | 10 | 8 | 20 | 41 | 57 | −16 | 38 | |
| 18 | Kochi United | 38 | 10 | 8 | 20 | 40 | 60 | −20 | 38 | |
| 19 | Nagano Parceiro | 38 | 9 | 8 | 21 | 29 | 57 | −28 | 35 | |
| 20 | Azul Claro Numazu (R) | 38 | 6 | 10 | 22 | 40 | 57 | −17 | 28 | Qualification for the relegation/promotion play-offs |

Source: Meiji Yasuda J3 League, J.League Data Site
Rules for classification: 1) Points; 2) Goal difference; 3) Goals scored; 4) Head-to-head points; 5) Head-to-head goal difference; 6) Head-to-head goal scored; 7) Fair-play points.
(C) Champions; (O) Play-off winners; (P) Promoted; (R) Relegated

==== Japan Football League (JFL) ====
| Pos | Team | Pld | W | D | L | GF | GA | GD | Pts | Promotion, qualification or relegation |
|---|---|---|---|---|---|---|---|---|---|---|
| 1 | Honda FC (C) | 30 | 17 | 9 | 4 | 51 | 28 | +23 | 60 | |
| 2 | Reilac Shiga (O, P) | 30 | 16 | 8 | 6 | 47 | 35 | +12 | 56 | Qualification for promotion playoffs |
| 3 | Briobecca Urayasu Ichikawa | 30 | 14 | 10 | 6 | 35 | 25 | +10 | 52 | |
| 4 | Tiamo Hirakata | 30 | 15 | 5 | 10 | 58 | 42 | +16 | 50 | |
| 5 | ReinMeer Aomori | 30 | 14 | 8 | 8 | 40 | 33 | +7 | 50 | |
| 6 | Verspah Oita | 30 | 14 | 7 | 9 | 41 | 33 | +8 | 49 | |
| 7 | Veertien Mie | 30 | 11 | 12 | 7 | 38 | 25 | +13 | 45 | |
| 8 | Okinawa SV | 30 | 12 | 7 | 11 | 39 | 41 | −2 | 43 | |
| 9 | Iwate Grulla Morioka | 30 | 11 | 6 | 13 | 45 | 49 | −4 | 39 | |
| 10 | Minebea Mitsumi | 30 | 9 | 7 | 14 | 40 | 41 | −1 | 34 | |
| 11 | Maruyasu Okazaki | 30 | 9 | 7 | 14 | 29 | 38 | −9 | 34 | |
| 12 | Criacao Shinjuku | 30 | 8 | 9 | 13 | 29 | 34 | −5 | 33 | |
| 13 | YSCC Yokohama | 30 | 8 | 6 | 16 | 35 | 56 | −21 | 30 | |
| 14 | Yokogawa Musashino | 30 | 7 | 8 | 15 | 17 | 37 | −20 | 29 | |
| 15 | Atletico Suzuka (R) | 30 | 7 | 7 | 16 | 30 | 46 | −16 | 28 | Qualified for relegation playoffs |
| 16 | Asuka FC (R) | 30 | 4 | 12 | 14 | 22 | 33 | −11 | 24 | Relegation to 2026–27 Japanese Regional Leagues |

Source: Japan Football League
Rules for classification: 1) Points; 2) Goal difference; 3) Goals scored; 4) Head-to-head points; 5) Head-to-head goal difference; 6) Head-to-head goal scored; 7) Fair-play points.
(C) Champions; (O) Play-off winners; (P) Promoted; (R) Relegated

==== Regional Champions League, Final Group ====
| Pos | Team | Pld | W | D | L | GF | GA | GD | Pts | Promotion |
|---|---|---|---|---|---|---|---|---|---|---|
| 1 | J-Lease (C, P) | 3 | 2 | 1 | 0 | 2 | 0 | +2 | 7 | Promoted to the JFL |
| 2 | Vonds Ichihara (O, P) | 3 | 2 | 0 | 1 | 2 | 1 | +1 | 6 | Qualification for JFL promotion/relegation play-off |
| 3 | Veroskronos Tsuno (E) | 3 | 1 | 1 | 1 | 2 | 2 | 0 | 4 | |
| 4 | Tokyo United (E) | 3 | 0 | 0 | 3 | 1 | 4 | −3 | 0 | |

Updated to match(es) played on 24 November 2025. Source: https://www.jfa.jp/match/regional_league_2025/schedule_result/
(C) Champions; (E) Eliminated; (O) Play-off winners; (P) Promoted

=== Cup competitions (men) ===
==== Fujifilm Super Cup ====
8 February 2025
13:36 JST

| Vissel Kobe | 0–2 | Sanfrecce Hiroshima |
|---|---|---|
| | Report | Arslan 12'; Araki 70' |

Japan National Stadium, Tokyo
Attendance: 53,343
Referee: Takafumi Mikuriya

== Attendances ==
Japanese football clubs with an average home league attendance of at least 10,000 in 2025 are listed.

| No. | Club | Average attendance | League |
|---|---|---|---|
| 1 | Urawa Red Diamonds | 36,765 | J1 |
| 2 | Nagoya Grampus | 32,113 | J1 |
| 3 | FC Tokyo | 31,328 | J1 |
| 4 | Gamba Osaka | 29,718 | J1 |
| 5 | Kashima Antlers | 29,302 | J1 |
| 6 | Yokohama F. Marinos | 26,578 | J1 |
| 7 | Sanfrecce Hiroshima | 25,541 | J1 |
| 8 | Albirex Niigata | 22,601 | J1 |
| 9 | Kawasaki Frontale | 22,050 | J1 |
| 10 | Tokyo Verdy | 21,116 | J1 |
| 11 | Vissel Kobe | 21,099 | J1 |
| 12 | Shimizu S-Pulse | 17,838 | J1 |
| 13 | Cerezo Osaka | 17,651 | J1 |
| 14 | Kyoto Sanga | 15,481 | J1 |
| 15 | V-Varen Nagasaki | 15,877 | J1 |
| 16 | JEF United Chiba | 15,549 | J1 |
| 17 | Fagiano Okayama | 14,587 | J1 |
| 18 | FC Machida Zelvia | 14,018 | J1 |
| 19 | Hokkaido Consadole Sapporo | 14,470 | J2 |
| 20 | Vegalta Sendai | 13,799 | J2 |
| 21 | Júbilo Iwata | 12,326 | J2 |
| 22 | Kashiwa Reysol | 12,276 | J1 |
| 23 | Shonan Bellmare | 11,431 | J1 |
| 24 | RB Omiya Ardija | 11,316 | J2 |
| 25 | Yokohama FC | 11,149 | J1 |
| 26 | Montedio Yamagata | 11,068 | J2 |
| 27 | Oita Trinita | 10,403 | J2 |
| 28 | Avispa Fukuoka | 10,031 | J1 |

== See also ==
- Japan Football Association (JFA)
