= 2024 U-16 International Dream Cup =

Japanese: U-16インターナショナルドリームカップ2024 JAPAN

Tournament details
- Host country: Japan
- City: Hirono and Naraha
- Dates: 19–23 June 2024
- Teams: 4 (from 4 confederations)
- Venue(s): 1 (in 2 host cities)

Final positions
- Champions: Japan (6th title)
- Runners-up: Venezuela
- Third place: Senegal
- Fourth place: Ukraine

Tournament statistics
- Matches played: 6
- Goals scored: 24 (4 per match)
- Top scorer(s): (Venezuela) Yerwin Sulbaran (4 goals)

The 2024 U-16 International Dream Cup (officially in Japanese: U-16インターナショナルドリームカップ2024 JAPAN), is the 8th edition of the U-16 International Dream Cup, an annual international age-restricted football tournament organized by the Japan Football Association (JFA). It is held at the J-Village Stadium in Fukushima, Japan from 19 to 23 June 2024.

== Format ==
The four invited teams played in a round-robin tournament. A penalty-shootout are played when the match resulted in a draw. Points awarded in the group stage followed the formula of three points for a win, two points for a penalty-shootout win, one point for a penalty-shootout loss, and zero points for a loss. In the event, if two teams were tied in points, tie-breakers would be applied in the order of goal difference, goals scored, head-to-head result, and a fair play score based on the number of yellow and red cards.

== Venue ==
2024 U-16 International Dream Cup is located in Japan	Hirono and Naraha
2024 U-16 International Dream Cup is located in Japan	J-Village Stadium
2024 U-16 International Dream Cup is located in Japan	Capacity: 5,000

== Participating teams ==
Team	Confederation
Japan (host)	AFC
Senegal	CAF
Venezuela	CONMEBOL
Ukraine	UEFA

== Results ==
=== Standings ===
Pos	Team	Pld	W	D	L	GF	GA	GD	Pts
1	Japan (H)	3	3	0	0	13	2	+11	9
2	Venezuela	3	2	0	1	6	6	0	6
3	Senegal	3	1	0	2	4	5	−1	3
4	Ukraine	3	0	0	3	1	11	−10	0

Updated to match(es) played on 23 June 2024. Source: JFA
Rules for classification: 1) points; 2) goal difference; 3) goals scored; 4) head-to-head result; 5) fair play ranking.
(H) Hosts

=== Matches ===
19 June 2024
12:00

Senegal	1–2	Venezuela
Wagne 62'	Report (JFA)	Lopez 29', 78'

J-Village Stadium, Hirono and Naraha
Attendance: 70
Referee: Masaki Adachi (Japan)
19 June 2024
15:00

Japan	6–0	Ukraine
Kasai 9'; Kanda 47'; Yoshida 69'; Okuda 83'; Fujii 88'; Asada 90'	Report (JFA)

J-Village Stadium, Hirono and Naraha
Attendance: 152
Referee: Masaaki Hiratsuka (Japan)

21 June 2024
12:00

Ukraine	0–1	Senegal
	Report (JFA)	Sow 45+1'

J-Village Stadium, Hirono and Naraha
Attendance: 70
Referee: Toshiki Tomomasa (Japan)
21 June 2024
15:00

Japan	4–0	Venezuela
Asada 10', 16'; Kasai 65'; Yoshida 90+5'	Report (JFA)

J-Village Stadium, Hirono and Naraha
Attendance: 161
Referee: Kazuyoshi Karashima (Japan)

23 June 2024
12:00

Venezuela	4–1	Ukraine
López 19', 68'; Garcia 32'; Muños 58'	Report (JFA)	Solomon 50'

J-Village Stadium, Hirono and Naraha
Attendance: 80
Referee: Yoshito Nakagawa (Japan)
23 June 2024
15:00

Japan	3–2	Senegal
Yoshida 54'; Yokoi 70'; Kasai 80'	Report (JFA)	Sow 45+1'; Wagne 50'

J-Village Stadium, Hirono, and Naraha
Attendance: 447
Referee: Daichi Shiino (Japan)

== Tournament statistics ==
=== Goalscorers ===
There were 10 goals scored in 6 matches, for an average of 1.67 goals per match.

4 goals

- (Venezuela) Yerwin Antonio Sulbaran Lopez

1 goal

- (Japan) Mibuki Kasai
- (Japan) Taito Kanda
- (Japan) Minato Yoshida
- (Japan) Yuma Okuda
- (Japan) Shota Fujii
- (Japan) Hiroto Asada
- (Senegal) Mouhamed Wagne
- (Senegal) Ibrahima Sory Sow

Source: JFA

== Media coverage ==
Broadcasters
Country	Broadcasting network	Television	Live streaming
Japan	J Sports	J Sports On Demand (all matches)	J Sports
Rest of world	—	—	JFATV (only matches not involving Japan)

== See also ==
- Japan Football Association (JFA)
- 2024 in Japanese football
