= 2023 U-16 International Dream Cup =

Japanese: U-16 インターナショナル ドリーム カップ 2023 JAPAN

Tournament details
- Host country: Japan
- City: Hirono and Naraha
- Dates: 31 May – 4 June 2023
- Teams: 4 (from 3 confederations)
- Venue(s): 1 (in 2 host cities)

Final positions
- Champions: Japan (5th title)
- Runners-up: Netherlands
- Third place: United States
- Fourth place: Nigeria

Tournament statistics
- Matches played: 6
- Goals scored: 23 (3.83 per match)
- Attendance: 1,375 (229 per match)
- Top scorer(s): (Japan) Keito Kumashiro (3 goals)

The 2023 U-16 International Dream Cup (officially in Japanese: U-16 インターナショナルドリームカップ2023 JAPAN presented by JFA), was the 7th edition of the U-16 International Dream Cup, an annual international age-restricted football tournament organized by the Japan Football Association (JFA). It was held at the J-Village Stadium from 31 May to 4 June 2023. Japan were crowned champions for the 5th time.

== Format ==
The four invited teams played in a round-robin tournament. A penalty-shootout are played when the match resulted in a draw. Points awarded in the group stage followed the formula of three points for a win, two points for a penalty-shootout win, one point for a penalty-shootout loss, and zero points for a loss. In the event, if two teams were tied in points, tie-breakers would be applied in the order of goal difference, goals scored, head-to-head result, and a fair play score based on the number of yellow and red cards.

== Venue ==
Hirono and Naraha
J-Village Stadium
Capacity: 5,000
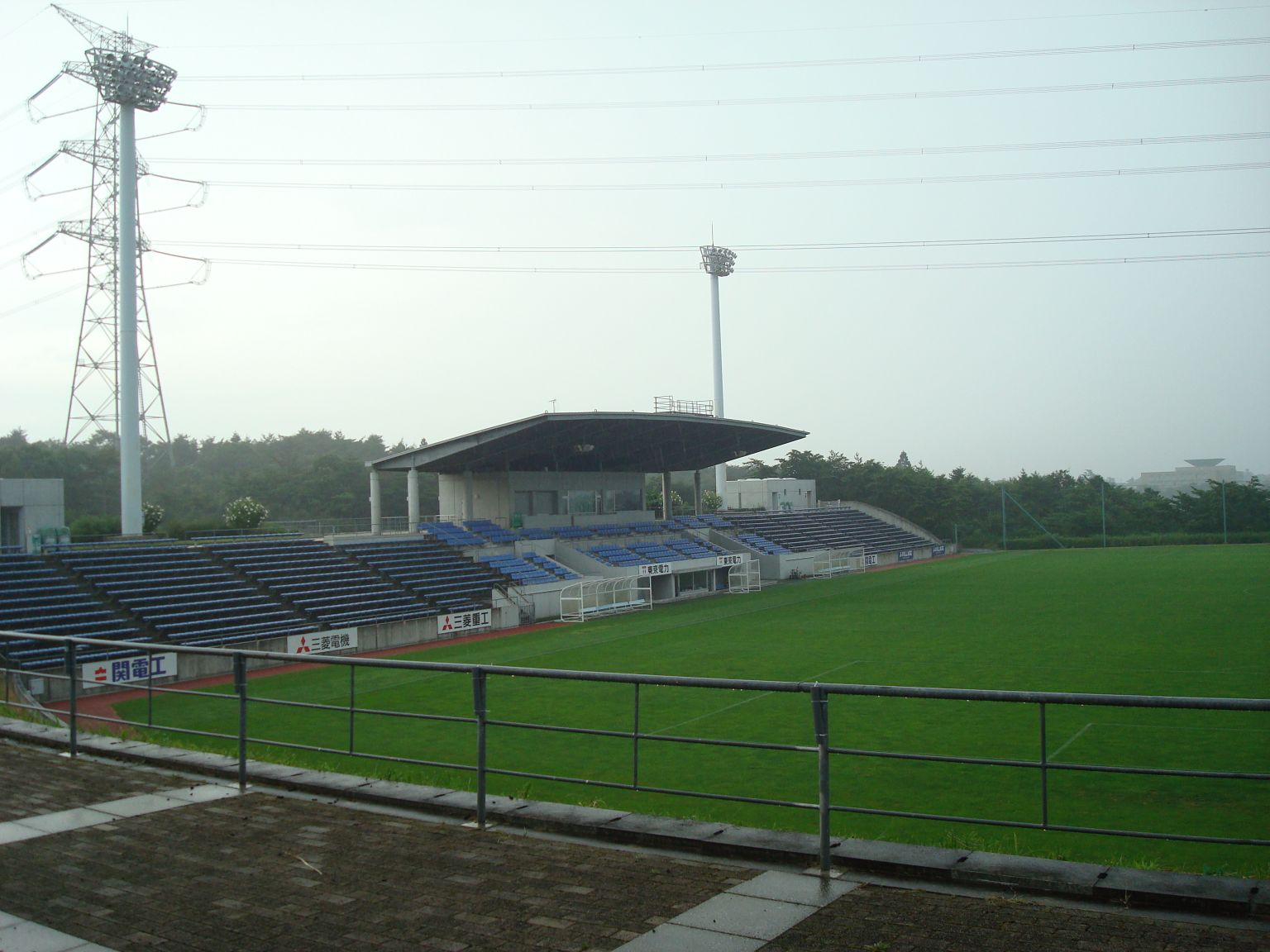

== Teams ==
Team	Confederation
Japan	AFC
Nigeria	CAF
United States	CONCACAF
Netherlands	UEFA

== Standings ==
Pos	Team	Pld	W	DW	DL	L	GF	GA	GD	Pts
1st place, gold medalist(s)	Japan (H)	3	2	0	0	1	11	5	+6	6
2nd place, silver medalist(s)	Netherlands	3	2	0	0	1	6	4	+2	6
3rd place, bronze medalist(s)	United States	3	2	0	0	1	4	5	−1	6
4	Nigeria	3	0	0	0	3	2	9	−7	0

Source: JFA
Rules for classification: 1) points; 2) goal difference; 3) goals scored; 4) head-to-head result; 5) fair play ranking.
(H) Host

== Results ==
31 May 2023
12:00

Netherlands	1–0	Nigeria
Jim Koller 12'	Report

J-Village Stadium, Hirono and Naraha
Attendance: 100
Referee: Masaki Adachi (Japan)
31 May 2023
15:00

Japan	1–2	United States
Keito Kumashiro 90+4'	Report	Santiago Morales 60'; Sean Petrie 83'

J-Village Stadium, Hirono and Naraha
Attendance: 175
Referee: Yoshikazu Matsuzawa (Japan)

2 June 2023
11:00

United States	0–3	Netherlands
	Report	Jesaja Riga Mustapha 21'; Haniel Pereira da Gama 42'; Benjamin Khaderi 82'

J-Village Stadium, Hirono and Naraha
Attendance: 100
Referee: Koji Takasaki (Japan)
2 June 2023
14:00

Japan	6–1	Nigeria
Shuto Oishi 2'; Keito Kumashiro 17', 32'; Kento Hamasaki 66'; Kota Sekiguchi 78'; Yusei Shima 90'	Report	Azuka Alatan 50'

J-Village Stadium, Hirono and Naraha
Attendance: 135
Referee: Ryo Munakata (Japan)

4 June 2023
12:00

Nigeria	1–2	United States
Solomon Udoh 85'	Report	Noah Santos 25'; Santiago Morales 64'

J-Village Stadium, Hirono and Naraha
Attendance: 165
Referee: Daichi Shiino (Japan)
4 June 2023
15:00

Japan	4–2	Netherlands
Yusei Shima 4'; Yuta Sugawara 10'; Kento Hamasaki 48'; Shuto Oishi 50'	Report	Lyfe Oldenstam 3'; Gino Verhulst 51'

J-Village Stadium, Hirono, and Naraha
Attendance: 700
Referee: Takahito Seta (Japan)

== Statistics ==
=== Goalscorers ===
There were 23 goals scored in 6 matches, for an average of 3.83 goals per match.

3 goals

- (Japan) Keito Kumashiro

2 goals

- (Japan) Kento Hamasaki
- (Japan) Shuto Oishi
- (Japan) Yusei Shima
- (United States) Santiago Morales

1 goal

- (Japan) Kota Sekiguchi
- (Japan) Yuta Sugawara
- (Netherlands) Benjamin Khaderi
- (Netherlands) Jim Koller
- (Netherlands) Jesaja Riga Mustapha
- (Netherlands) Lyfe Oldenstam
- (Netherlands) Haniel Pereira da Gama
- (Netherlands) Gine Verhulst
- (Nigeria) Azuka Alatan
- (Nigeria) Solomon Udoh
- (United States) Noah Santos
- (United States) Sean Petrie

== Media coverage ==
Broadcasters
Country	Broadcasting network	Television	Live streaming
Japan	J Sports	J Sports On Demand (all matches)	—
Rest of world	—	—	JFATV (match 1, 3, 5 only)

== See also ==
- Japan Football Association
- 2023 in Japanese football
