= 2023 U-16 International Dream Cup squads =

List of squads for men's international team for FIFA World Cup 2022

The 2023 U-16 International Dream Cup is an international youth football tournament held in Japan from 31 May to 4 June 2023.

== Squad ==
=== Japan ===
Japan announced the squad on 25 May 2023.

Coach: Nozomi Hiroyama

No.	Pos.	Player	Date of birth (age)	Club
1	GK	Rui Araki	14 October 2007 (age 17)	(Japan Football Association) Gamba Osaka
12	GK	Hikaru Ogawa	24 June 2007 (age 18)	(Japan Football Association) Sanfrecce Hiroshima
2	DF	Reon Tanaka	1 February 2007 (age 18)	(Japan Football Association) Tokyo Jitsugyo HS
3	DF	Sota Tsukuda	28 August 2007 (age 18)	(Japan Football Association) Yokohama FC
4	DF	Yusei Shima	31 May 2007 (age 18)	(Japan Football Association) Vissel Kobe
5	DF	Yugo Okawa	14 July 2007 (age 18)	(Japan Football Association) Kashima Antlers
15	DF	Shunya Sakai	28 May 2007 (age 18)	(Japan Football Association) Omiya Ardija
16	DF	Yuta Sugawara	7 September 2007 (age 18)	(Japan Football Association) FC Tokyo
18	DF	Soichiro Mori	29 June 2007 (age 18)	(Japan Football Association) Nagoya Grampus
6	MF	Katsuma Fuse	11 March 2007 (age 18)	(Japan Football Association) Nihon Fujisawa HS
7	MF	Kento Hamasaki	16 June 2007 (age 18)	(Japan Football Association) Vissel Kobe
8	MF	Towa Osada	12 March 2007 (age 18)	(Japan Football Association) Gamba Osaka
11	MF	Kazuki Fukushima	27 April 2007 (age 18)	(Japan Football Association) Kamimura Gakuen HS
14	MF	Kanta Kawasaki	4 April 2007 (age 18)	(Japan Football Association) Consadole Sapporo
17	MF	Ryuki Osa	13 October 2007 (age 17)	(Japan Football Association) Shohei HS
20	MF	Gota Yamaguchi	24 April 2007 (age 18)	(Japan Football Association) Shohei HS
9	FW	Keito Kumashiro	25 October 2007 (age 17)	(Japan Football Association) Roasso Kumamoto
10	FW	Shion Nakayama	16 October 2007 (age 17)	(Japan Football Association) Tokyo Verdy
13	FW	Shuto Oishi	11 December 2007 (age 17)	(Japan Football Association) Kagoshima Josei HS
19	FW	Kota Sekiguchi	13 November 2007 (age 17)	(Japan Football Association) Shimizu S-Pulse

=== Netherlands ===
Netherlands announced the squad on 29 May 2023.

Coach: Alexander Palland

No.	Pos.	Player	Date of birth (age)	Club
16	GK	Valentijn Van Der Velde		(Royal Dutch Football Association) Ajax
1	GK	Joep Geneste		(Royal Dutch Football Association) NEC Nijmegen
23	GK	Aymean El Hani		(Royal Dutch Football Association) Ajax
13	DF	Frederick Reuter		(Royal Dutch Football Association) Utrecht
14	DF	Geronimo Londar		(Royal Dutch Football Association) Vitesse
3	DF	Mylo Van der Lans		(Royal Dutch Football Association) Ajax
2	DF	Dinay Bierstekers		(Royal Dutch Football Association) Vitesse
5	DF	Lucas Jetten		(Royal Dutch Football Association) Ajax
15	DF	Rivas Manuhutu		(Royal Dutch Football Association) PSV
4	DF	Aaron Bouwman		(Royal Dutch Football Association) Ajax
12	DF	Luuk Beekman		(Royal Dutch Football Association) Ajax
20	MF	Jaden de Guzmán		(Royal Dutch Football Association) PSV
8	MF	Joel Van den Berg		(Royal Dutch Football Association) Vitesse
10	MF	Jim Koller		(Royal Dutch Football Association) Vitesse
6	MF	Thijs Kraaijeveld		(Royal Dutch Football Association) Feyenoord
17	MF	Gino Verhulst		(Royal Dutch Football Association) PSV
18	MF	Benjamin Khaderi		(Royal Dutch Football Association) PSV
22	MF	Benjamin Nagel		(Royal Dutch Football Association) Twente
7	FW	Lyfe Oldenstam		(Royal Dutch Football Association) Ajax
19	FW	Jesaja Riga Mustapha		(Royal Dutch Football Association) Ajax
11	FW	Shane Kluivert		(Royal Spanish Football Federation) Barcelona
21	FW	Haniel Pereira da Gama		(Royal Dutch Football Association) Ajax
9	FW	Sami Bouhoudane		(Royal Dutch Football Association) PSV

=== Nigeria ===
Nigeria announced the squad on 29 May 2023.

Coach: Haruna Usman

No.	Pos.	Player	Date of birth (age)	Club
1	GK	Tomiwa Oladokun		(Nigeria Football Federation) Mee Palace Jos
16	GK	Caleb Henry		(Nigeria Football Federation) Olympics Hybrid Abuja
2	DF	Taiye Isiaka		(Nigeria Football Federation) Dikalo Babes Ilorin
3	DF	Solomon Udoh		(Nigeria Football Federation) N Youth
4	DF	Solomon Adabo		(Nigeria Football Federation) Mee Palace Jos
5	DF	Muhammad Abdullahi		(Nigeria Football Federation) Beyond Limit Football Academy Remo
6	DF	Azuka Alatan		(Nigeria Football Federation) Hybebuzz Football Academy
7	DF	Taiwo Sogelola		(Nigeria Football Federation) M/N FC Ibadan
14	DF	Buhari Usman		(Nigeria Football Federation) Kings Sport FC
11	MF	Destiny Samuel		(Nigeria Football Federation) Successful Pillars Football Academy PH
12	MF	Edward Ochigbo		(Nigeria Football Federation) Government Secondary School Gboko
13	MF	Adnan Kabir		(Nigeria Football Federation) Beyond Limit Football Academy Remo
17	MF	Sulaiman Lawali		(Nigeria Football Federation) Zamfara Football Academy Gusau
8	FW	Promise Meliga		(Nigeria Football Federation) Beyond Limit Football Academy Remo
9	FW	Sunday Ogbonnaya		(Nigeria Football Federation) Beyond Limit Football Academy Remo
10	FW	Idris Khamis		(Nigeria Football Federation) FC Heart Kano
15	FW	John Alex		(Nigeria Football Federation) 36 Lion Football Academy Lagos
18	FW	Ebrima Manneh		(Nigeria Football Federation) Hybebuzz Football Academy

=== United States ===
United States announced the squad on 23 May 2023.

Coach: Michael Nsien

No.	Pos.	Player	Date of birth (age)	Club
	GK	Zackory Campagnolo		(United States Soccer Federation) Orlando City
	GK	Patrick Los		(United States Soccer Federation) Chicago Fire
	DF	Davi Alexandre		(United States Soccer Federation) New York Red Bulls
	DF	Nicholas Almeida		(United States Soccer Federation) Inter Miami
	DF	Andrew Baiera		(United States Soccer Federation) New York City
	DF	Christian McFarlane		(United States Soccer Federation) New York City
	DF	Neil Pierre		(United States Soccer Federation) Philadelphia Union
	DF	Joshua Santiago		(United States Soccer Federation) Los Angeles
	DF	Jeremiah White IV		(United States Soccer Federation) Philadelphia Union
	MF	Maximo Carrizo		(United States Soccer Federation) New York City
	MF	Stiven Jimenez		(United States Soccer Federation) Cincinnati
	MF	Santiago Morales		(United States Soccer Federation) Inter Miami
	MF	Axel Perez		(French Football Federation) Olympique Lyonnais
	MF	Jonathan Shore		(United States Soccer Federation) New York City
	MF	Ervin Torres Jr.		(United States Soccer Federation) Austin
	MF	Adyn Torres		(United States Soccer Federation) Atlanta United
	FW	Nimfasha Berchimas		(United States Soccer Federation) Charlotte
	FW	Caden Glover		(United States Soccer Federation) St. Louis City
	FW	Bryce Outman		(United States Soccer Federation) Dallas
	FW	Noah Santos		(United States Soccer Federation) Portland Timbers

== Statistics ==
=== Player representation by club ===
Clubs with fewer than 10 players:
Players	Clubs

=== Player representation by club confederation ===
Confederation	Players	Percentage
