= Japan national under-17 football team =

Japan Under-17
- Nickname(s): サムライ・ブルー (Samurai Blue)
- Association: JFA
- Confederation: AFC
- Sub-confederation: EAFF
- Head coach: Nozomi Hiroyama
- Most caps: Hikaru Naruoka (44)
- Top scorer: Koki Saito (16)
- FIFA code: JPN
First colours	Second colours

First international
- Japan 4–0 Singapore (Bangkok, Thailand; 22 August 1984)

Biggest win
- Guam 0–26 Japan (Qingdao, China; 1 September 2023)

Biggest defeat
- England 5–0 Japan (Benidorm, Spain; 4 December 2019)

FIFA U-17 World Cup
- Appearances: 11 (first in 1993)
- Best result: Quarterfinals (1993, 2011, 2025)

AFC U-17 Asian Cup
- Appearances: 16 (first in 1985)
- Best result: Champions (1994, 2006, 2018, 2023, 2026)

The Japan national under-17 football team (Japanese: U-17サッカー日本代表, Hepburn: U-17 sakkā Nihon daihyō) is a national association football youth team of Japan and is controlled by the Japan Football Association. The team were champions in the 1994 and 2006 AFC U-17 Championships, as well as the 2012 AFF U-16 Youth Championship. The year before the FIFA U-17 World Cup, the national team is renamed the Japan national under-16 football team, and the year before that, the national team is renamed the Japan national under-15 football team.

== Results and fixtures ==
Legend

Win Draw Lose Void or Postponed Fixture

=== 2026 ===
==== U-17 ====
20 February Balcom BMW Cup	Japan	1–0	Tajikistan	Hiroshima, Japan
13:30 UTC+9		Report		Stadium: Sanfrecce Village Hiroshima No. 1 Ball Game Stadium

22 February Balcom BMW Cup	Hiroshima U-17 HS Selection (Japan)	0–3	Japan	Hiroshima, Japan
11:00 UTC+9		Report		Stadium: Sanfrecce Village Hiroshima No. 1 Ball Game Stadium

23 February Balcom BMW Cup	Sanfrecce Hiroshima (Japan)	0–4	Japan	Hiroshima, Japan
11:00 UTC+9		Report		Stadium: Sanfrecce Village Hiroshima No. 1 Ball Game Stadium

16 March Friendly	Chile	2–1	Japan	Ezeiza, Argentina
16:00 UTC−3		Report		Stadium: Lionel Andrés Messi Training Center

20 March Friendly	Argentina	2–1	Japan	Ezeiza, Argentina
10:00 UTC−3		Report		Stadium: Lionel Andrés Messi Training Center

5 May 2026 AFC U-17 Asian Cup GS	Japan	3–1	Qatar	Jeddah, Saudi Arabia
19:00 UTC+3	Saito 51'; Kitahara 70', 76'	Wiwat Jumpao-on (Thailand)	Tokode 25'	Stadium: King Abdullah Sports City Training Stadium (Pitch C); Referee: https://www.the-afc.com/en/matches/afc-u17-asian-cup/2026/2626773

9 May 2026 AFC U-17 Asian Cup GS	China	1–2	Japan	Jeddah, Saudi Arabia
19:00 UTC+3	Zhao Songyuan 48'	Sultan Al-Hammadi (United Arab Emirates)	Motosuna 37'; Kitahara 60'	Stadium: King Abdullah Sports City Training Stadium (Pitch C); Referee: https://www.the-afc.com/en/matches/afc-u17-asian-cup/2026/2626775

12 May 2026 AFC U-17 Asian Cup GS	Japan	3–1	Indonesia	Jeddah, Saudi Arabia
19:00 UTC+3	Tsuneyoshi 28'; Wada 59'; Okamoto 71'	Harish Kundu (India)	Peres 70'	Stadium: King Abdullah Sports City Training Stadium (Pitch A); Referee: https://www.the-afc.com/en/matches/afc-u17-asian-cup/2026/2626777

15 May 2026 AFC U-17 Asian Cup QF	Japan	5–0	Tajikistan	Jeddah, Saudi Arabia
19:00 UTC+3	Kitahara 42', 60'; Saito 69'; Satomi 79'; Khodzhiev 90' (o.g.)	Abdullah Al-Shehri (Saudi Arabia)		Stadium: King Abdullah Sports City Training Stadium (Pitch C); Referee: https://www.the-afc.com/en/matches/afc-u17-asian-cup/2026/2626791

19 May 2026 AFC U-17 Asian Cup SF	Japan	1–1 (3–2 p)	Uzbekistan	Jeddah, Saudi Arabia
18:00 UTC+3	Ezemuokwe 90+7'	Report	Aliev 28' (pen.)	Stadium: King Abdullah Sports City Hall Stadium; Attendance: 80; Referee: Harish Kundu (India)

22 May 2026 AFC U-17 Asian Cup F	China	2–3	Japan	Jeddah, Saudi Arabia
20:00 UTC+3	Wan Xiang 48'; Zhao Songyuan 79' (pen.)	Report	Satomi 31'; Saito 42'; Kitahara 45+2'	Stadium: King Abdullah Sports City Hall Stadium; Attendance: 495; Referee: Sultan Al-Hammadi (United Arab Emirates)

17 September IYS in Niigata	Japan	4–2	Myanmar	Niigata, Argentina
15:00 UTC+9		Report		Stadium: Niigata Athletic Stadium

19 September IYS in Niigata	Japan	2–0	(Japan) Niigata U-17 Selection	Niigata, Argentina
12:00 UTC+9		Report		Stadium: Niigata Athletic Stadium

21 September IYS in Niigata	Japan	4–0	New Zealand	Niigata, Argentina
17:30 UTC+9		Report		Stadium: Denka Big Swan Stadium

23 September Limoges International Tournament	Japan	2–1	Ukraine	Limoges, France
15:00 UTC+2		Report		Stadium: Stade de Beaublanc

25 September Limoges International Tournament	Japan	1–2	Australia	Limoges, France
15:00 UTC+2		Report		Stadium: Stade de Beaublanc

27 September Limoges International Tournament	France	v	Japan	Limoges, France
18:00 UTC+2		Report		Stadium: Stade de Beaublanc

21 November 2026 FIFA U-17 World Cup	Japan	v	Colombia	Al-Rayyan, Qatar
15:30 UTC+3				Stadium: Aspire Zone

24 November 2026 FIFA U-17 World Cup	Japan	v	Serbia	Al-Rayyan, Qatar
16:00 UTC+3				Stadium: Aspire Zone

27 November 2026 FIFA U-17 World Cup	Honduras	v	Japan	Al-Rayyan, Qatar
16:00 UTC+3				Stadium: Aspire Zone

==== U-16 ====
12 February 4 Nations Tournament	Portugal	3–0	Japan	Vila Real de Santo António, Portugal
13:00 UTC+0		Report		Stadium: Complexo Desportivo de VRSA

14 February 4 Nations Tournament	Germany	8–1	Japan	Vila Real de Santo António, Portugal
13:00 UTC+0		Report		Stadium: Complexo Desportivo de VRSA

17 February 4 Nations Tournament	Netherlands	0–2	Japan	Vila Real de Santo António, Portugal
12:00 UTC+0		Report		Stadium: Complexo Desportivo de VRSA

31 March 2026 Montaigu Tournament	Peru	0–0	Japan	Pouzauges, France
18:30 UTC+2		Report		Stadium: Stade Jacques-Chartier

1 April 2026 UEFA Under-16 Development Tournament	Albania	1–2	Japan	Tirana, Albania
14:30 UTC+2				Stadium: Arena Kombëtare

2 April 2026 Montaigu Tournament	Japan	0–1	Portugal	Pouzauges, France
18:30 UTC+2		Report		Stadium: Stade Jacques-Chartier

3 April 2026 UEFA Under-16 Development Tournament	Sweden	1–1 (4–2 p)	Japan	Tirana, Albania
11:30 UTC+2				Stadium: Arena Kombëtare

4 April 2026 Montaigu Tournament	Mexico	3–3	Japan	Fontenay-le-Comte, France
18:00 UTC+2		Report		Stadium: Stade Emmanuel-Murzeau

6 April 2026 UEFA Under-16 Development Tournament	Sweden	3–1	Japan	Tirana, Albania
14:00 UTC+2		Report		Stadium: Arena Kombëtare

6 April 2026 Montaigu Tournament	France	1–1 (5–4 p)	Japan	Pouzauges, France
18:30 UTC+2		Report		Stadium: Stade Jacques-Chartier

3 June 2026 U-16 International Dream Cup	Japan	3–2	Ivory Coast	Hirono and Naraha
16:00 UTC+9		Report		Stadium: J-Village Stadium

5 June 2026 U-16 International Dream Cup	Japan	3–1	France	Hirono and Naraha
15:00 UTC+9		Report		Stadium: J-Village Stadium

7 June 2026 U-16 International Dream Cup	Japan	4–1	Argentina	Hirono and Naraha
14:00 UTC+9		Report		Stadium: J-Village Stadium

==== U-15 ====
19 May Vlatko Marković International Tournament	England	3–1	Japan	Kotoriba, Croatia
16:30 UTC+2				Stadium: Sportski Park Kotoriba

20 May Vlatko Marković International Tournament	Croatia	1–4	Japan	Čakovec, Croatia
17:00 UTC+2				Stadium: Stadion SRC Mladost

22 May Vlatko Marković International Tournament	Brazil	2–0	Japan	Nedelišće, Croatia
11:00 UTC+2				Stadium: Stadion Nedelišće

24 May Vlatko Marković International Tournament	Japan	2–2 (1–3 p)	United States	Nedelišće, Croatia
12:00 UTC+2				Stadium: Stadion Nedelišće

=== 2025 ===
==== U-17 ====
21 November FIFA U-17 World Cup QF	Austria	1–0	Japan	Al-Rayyan, Qatar
15:30	Moser 49'	Report		Stadium: Aspire Zone; Referee: Paulo Zanovelli (Brazil)

- Fixtures & Results (U-17 2025), JFA.jp

==== U-16 ====
14 December Friendly	Egypt	0–0 (4–3 p)	Japan	Giza, Egypt
14:00 UTC+2		Report		Stadium: Egyptian National Teams Center

17 December Friendly	Egypt	1–1 (3–1 p)	Japan	Giza, Egypt
14:00 UTC+2	Goal 84'	Report	Rikuto Soma 72'	Stadium: Egyptian National Teams Center

- Fixtures & Results (U-16 2025), JFA.jp

==== U-15 ====
18 December 2025 EAFF U-15 Championship	China	0–3	Japan	Zhangzhou, China
15:00 UTC+8		Report	Eita Sawaguchi 34'; Soma Iida 50'; Ren Isobe 55'	Stadium: Hooray International Football Training Base Stadium; Referee: Bai Qitao (China)

20 December 2025 EAFF U-15 Championship	Hong Kong	0–2	Japan	Zhangzhou, China
10:10 UTC+8		Report	Yu Nanakubo 39'; Ren Isobe 70+1'	Stadium: Hooray International Football Training Base Pitch 5 Referee: Shi Liangyi (China)

22 December 2025 EAFF U-15 Championship	Japan	0–3	South Korea	Zhangzhou, China
10:00 UTC+8		Report	Seongjun Myoung 20'; Woojin Jung 47', 55'	Stadium: Hooray International Football Training Base Pitch 5

- Fixtures & Results (U-15 2025), JFA.jp

== Coaching staff ==
=== Current staff ===
As of 14 September 2026.

Role	Name
Head coach	(Japan) Shingi Ono
Assistant coach	(Japan) Takashi Yamahashi
Goalkeeping coach	(Japan) Daishi Ide
Physical coach	(Japan) Tadayuki Komine
Technical staff	(Japan) Mahiro Hikida

== Players ==
=== Current U-17 squad ===
The following players were called up on 14 September 2026 for the Limoges International Tournament, held in September 2026. Kakeru Saito and Shun Tatemi were replaced by Masaki Koyama and Taiki Akimoto.

No.	Pos.	Player	Date of birth (age)	Caps	Goals	Club
	GK	Kosei Oshita	7 August 2009 (age 17)	7	0	(Japan Football Association) Kashima Antlers
	GK	Zakariah Takagi	18 February 2009 (age 17)	0	0	(The Football Association) Cambridge United
	DF	Chimezie Kai Ezemuokwe	2 April 2009 (age 17)	6	1	(Japan Football Association) Cerezo Osaka
	DF	Koki Kurahashi	5 July 2009 (age 17)	5	1	(Japan Football Association) Kashima Antlers
	DF	Yuzo Takeuchi	27 May 2010 (age 16)	5	0	(Japan Football Association) Nagoya Grampus
	DF	Riku Hashimoto	14 December 2009 (age 16)	0	0	(Japan Football Association) FC Tokyo
	DF	Ken Kawahara	12 June 2009 (age 17)	0	0	(United States Soccer Federation) San Jose Earthquakes
	DF	Hinata Nishino	26 July 2009 (age 17)	0	0	(Japan Football Association) Júbilo Iwata
	MF	Takeshi Wada	5 June 2009 (age 17)	14	2	(Japan Football Association) Urawa Red Diamonds
	MF	Kazato Kimura	16 September 2009 (age 17)	7	0	(Japan Football Association) Kawasaki Frontale
	MF	Sosuke Hoshi	3 March 2009 (age 17)	6	0	(Japan Football Association) Shoshi High School
	MF	Yoshiki Fujimoto	2 April 2009 (age 17)	5	0	(Japan Football Association) Gamba Osaka
	MF	Rekuto Shiraogawa	11 January 2009 (age 17)	3	0	(Japan Football Association) Nagoya Grampus
	MF	Ryo Igarashi	19 December 2009 (age 16)	0	0	(Japan Football Association) Kashiwa Reysol
	MF	Ryotaro Inouchi	3 May 2009 (age 17)	0	0	(Japan Football Association) Vissel Kobe
	MF	Rento Kajiyama	3 February 2010 (age 16)	0	0	(Japan Football Association) FC Tokyo
	MF	Haruma Kinoshita	15 February 2009 (age 17)	0	0	(Japan Football Association) Tokyo Verdy
	MF	Taiki Akimoto	29 January 2010 (age 16)	0	0	(Japan Football Association) Funabashi Municipal High School
	MF	Ryowa Sakoda	25 October 2010 (age 16)	0	0	(Japan Football Association) RB Omiya Ardija
	FW	Kyoya Tatsuno	24 April 2009 (age 17)	0	0	(Japan Football Association) Shohei High School
	FW	Masaki Koyama	17 January 2010 (age 16)			(Japan Football Association) Teikyo Nagaoka High School

=== Current U-16 squad ===
The following U-16 players were called up on 26 May 2026 for the 2026 U-16 International Dream Cup.

No.	Pos.	Player	Date of birth (age)	Club
1	GK	Kento Schultz	17 April 2010 (age 16)	(Japan Football Association) Kashima Antlers
12	GK	Sosuke Obata	9 July 2010 (age 16)	(Japan Football Association) Gamba Osaka
2	DF	Haru Tsushima	16 June 2010 (age 16)	(Japan Football Association) Kawasaki Frontale
3	DF	Teppei Ogaki	19 November 2010 (age 16)	(Japan Football Association) Shimizu S-Pulse
4	DF	Yuga Fujita	6 June 2010 (age 16)	(Japan Football Association) JEF United Chiba
5	DF	Koshiro Ueno	28 April 2011 (age 15)	(Japan Football Association) Kawasaki Frontale Ikuta
15	DF	Shuto Nakayama	27 June 2010 (age 16)	(Japan Football Association) Yokohama F. Marinos
18	DF	Naohiro Watanabe	29 October 2010 (age 16)	(Japan Football Association) Tokyo Verdy
6	MF	Yohan Hanamoto	1 November 2010 (age 16)	(Japan Football Association) Vissel Kobe
7	MF	Sakuto Fukaya	10 May 2010 (age 16)	(Japan Football Association) Nagoya Grampus
10	MF	Rento Kajiyama	3 February 2010 (age 16)	(Japan Football Association) FC Tokyo
13	MF	Arata Shindo	26 April 2010 (age 16)	(Japan Football Association) Kashiwa Reysol
14	MF	Yujin Sega	30 April 2010 (age 16)	(Japan Football Association) FC Tokyo
16	MF	Atsuki Sameshima	2 November 2010 (age 16)	(Japan Football Association) Nagoya Grampus
17	MF	Ko Ito	4 October 2010 (age 16)	(Japan Football Association) FC Tokyo
8	FW	Shin Miidera	2 April 2010 (age 16)	(Japan Football Association) Yokohama F. Marinos
9	FW	Kenshin Takada	11 November 2010 (age 16)	(Japan Football Association) Teikyo University Kani High School
11	FW	Hayato Yairo	18 March 2010 (age 16)	(Japan Football Association) Nagoya Grampus
19	FW	Ryowa Sakoda	25 October 2010 (age 16)	(Japan Football Association) RB Omiya Ardija
20	FW	Kaio Otsukoro	7 January 2011 (age 15)	(Japan Football Association) Shohei High School

=== Current U-15 squad ===
The following players were called-up on 11 May 2026 for the Vlatko Marković International Tournament. Takeru Kizushi and Kaito Asano were replaced by Jin Maruoka and Yuito Nakajima, sidelined due to injury.

No.	Pos.	Player	Date of birth (age)	Club
1	GK	Kaoru Aoki	4 February 2011 (age 15)	(Japan Football Association) Kawasaki Frontale
12	GK	Rikito Ueda	19 June 2011 (age 15)	(Japan Football Association) Kyoto Sanga
2	DF	Jin Maruoka	29 July 2011 (age 15)	(Japan Football Association) Cerezo Osaka
3	DF	Atsuto Oishi	9 May 2011 (age 15)	(Japan Football Association) Taiyo SC
4	DF	Koshi Mizuguchi	5 April 2011 (age 15)	(Japan Football Association) Vissel Kobe
5	DF	Haruki Tsukimisato	19 July 2011 (age 15)	(Japan Football Association) Kawasaki Frontale Ikuta
6	DF	Kuon Ichinose	7 January 2011 (age 15)	(Japan Football Association) Consadole Sapporo
15	DF	Shuji Takada	26 June 2011 (age 15)	(Japan Football Association) Progresso Sano
16	DF	Masaya Nakamura	8 August 2011 (age 15)	(Japan Football Association) Kyoto Sanga
21	DF	Aoto Sumikawa	7 October 2011 (age 15)	(Japan Football Association) Gamba Osaka
7	MF	Minato Yamada	10 May 2011 (age 15)	(Japan Football Association) Yokohama F. Marinos
8	MF	Ichito Noguchi	1 November 2011 (age 15)	(Japan Football Association) Sorriso Kumamoto
11	MF	Junzaburo Katayama	2 April 2011 (age 15)	(Japan Football Association) Sanfrecce Hiroshima
13	MF	Ko Igawa	6 April 2011 (age 15)	(Japan Football Association) Júbilo Iwata
14	MF	Ryo Suzuki	25 April 2011 (age 15)	(Japan Football Association) Yokohama F. Marinos
17	MF	Ryuga Tamura	5 April 2011 (age 15)	(Japan Football Association) JFA Academy Fukushima
18	MF	Tsubasa Sano	12 April 2011 (age 15)	(Japan Football Association) Yokohama F. Marinos
19	MF	Genta Yagihashi	18 June 2011 (age 15)	(Japan Football Association) Kashiwa Reysol
9	FW	Ippei Adachi	14 April 2011 (age 15)	(Japan Football Association) FC Tokyo Fukagawa
10	FW	Rintaro Tanaka	6 April 2011 (age 15)	(Japan Football Association) FC Alonza
20	FW	Yuito Nakajima	28 June 2011 (age 15)	(Japan Football Association) FC Tokyo Musashi
22	FW	Ryui Aoki	11 September 2011 (age 15)	(Japan Football Association) Ehime FC

=== Previous squads ===
FIFA U-17 World Cup

- 1993 FIFA U-17 World Championship
- 1995 FIFA U-17 World Championship
- 2001 FIFA U-17 World Championship
- 2007 FIFA U-17 World Cup
- 2009 FIFA U-17 World Cup
- 2011 FIFA U-17 World Cup
- 2013 FIFA U-17 World Cup
- 2017 FIFA U-17 World Cup
- 2019 FIFA U-17 World Cup

AFC U-17 Asian Cup

- 2010 AFC U-16 Championship
- 2012 AFC U-16 Championship
- 2014 AFC U-16 Championship
- 2016 AFC U-16 Championship
- 2018 AFC U-16 Championship

== Records ==
As of 23 June 2024

=== Most capped player ===
#	Name	Caps	Goals	Pos	Career
1	Hikaru Naruoka	44	5	MF	2017–2019
2	Kaito Suzuki	38	1	DF	2017–2019
3	Shinya Nakano	36	1	DF	2017–2019
4	Koshiro Sumi	34	4	MF	2017–2019
4	Tochi Suzuki	34	6	MF	2015–2017
4	Kosei Tani	34	0	GK	2015–2017
7	Takefusa Kubo	28	15	MF	2015–2017
7	Yutaka Michiwaki	28	15	FW	2022–2023
9	Gaku Nawata	22	13	FW	2022–2023
10	Homare Tokuda	20	12	FW	2022–2023

=== Top goalscorer ===
#	Name	Goals	Caps	Ratio	Career
1	Koki Saito	16	15	1.07	2017–2018
2	Takefusa Kubo	15	28	0.54	2015–2017
2	Yutaka Michiwaki	15	28	0.54	2022–2023
4	Keita Nakano	13	18	0.72	2017–2019
4	Gaku Nawata	13	22	0.59	2022–2023
6	Homare Tokuda	12	20	0.6	2022–2023
7	Takashi Usami	10	16	0.63	2007–2009
7	Minato Yoshida	10	12	0.83	2023–
9	Rento Takaoka	9	19	0.47	2022–2023
9	Keito Nakamura	9	16	0.56	2015–2017

== Honours ==
=== Continental ===
- AFC U-17/U-16 Asian Cup

Champions (4): 1994, 2006, 2018, 2023

- AFF U-16 Youth Championship

Champions (1): 2012

=== Unofficial ===
- Tournament de Montaigu

Champions (1): 2004

- International Dream Cup

Champions (6): 2015, 2017, 2019, 2022, 2023, 2024

== Competitive record ==
=== FIFA U-17 World Cup ===
Year	Result	Pld	W	D	L	GF	GA
(China) 1985	Did not qualify						
(Canada) 1987	Did not qualify						
(Scotland) 1989	Did not qualify						
(Italy) 1991	Did not enter						
(Japan) 1993	Quarter-finals	4	1	1	2	3	4
(Ecuador) 1995	Group stage	3	1	1	1	2	2
(Egypt) 1997	Did not qualify						
(New Zealand) 1999	Did not qualify						
(Trinidad and Tobago) 2001	Group stage	3	1	0	2	2	9
(Finland) 2003	Did not qualify						
(Peru) 2005	Did not qualify						
(South Korea) 2007	Group stage	3	1	0	2	4	6
(Nigeria) 2009	Group stage	3	0	0	3	5	9
(Mexico) 2011	Quarter-finals	5	3	1	1	13	5
(United Arab Emirates) 2013	Round of 16	4	3	0	1	7	4
(Chile) 2015	Did not qualify						
(India) 2017	Round of 16	4	1	2	1	8	4
(Brazil) 2019	Round of 16	4	2	1	1	4	2
(Indonesia) 2023	Round of 16	4	2	0	2	5	5
(Qatar) 2025	Quarter-finals	6	3	2	1	8	3
(Qatar) 2026	In progress	1	0	0	1	1	2
(Qatar) 2027	To be determined						
(Qatar) 2028	To be determined						
(Qatar) 2029	To be determined						
Total:12/24	Quarter-finals	44	18	8	18	62	55

FIFA U-17 World Cup history
Year	Round	Score	Result
1993	Group stage	Japan 0–1 Ghana	Loss
1993	Group stage	Japan 0–0 Italy	Draw
1993	Group stage	Japan 2–1 Mexico	Win
1993	Quarter-finals	Japan 1–2 Nigeria	Loss
1995	Group stage	Japan 0–1 Ghana	Loss
1995	Group stage	Japan 2–1 United States	Win
1995	Group stage	Japan 0–0 Ecuador	Draw
2001	Group stage	Japan 1–0 United States	Win
2001	Group stage	Japan 0–4 Nigeria	Loss
2001	Group stage	Japan 1–5 France	Loss
2007	Group stage	Japan 3–1 Haiti	Win
2007	Group stage	Japan 0–3 Nigeria	Loss
2007	Group stage	Japan 1–2 France	Loss
2009	Group stage	Japan 2–3 Brazil	Loss
2009	Group stage	Japan 3–4 Switzerland	Loss
2009	Group stage	Japan 0–2 Mexico	Loss
2011	Group stage	Japan 1–0 Jamaica	Win
2011	Group stage	Japan 1–1 France	Draw
2011	Group stage	Japan 3–1 Argentina	Win
2011	Round of 16	Japan 6–0 New Zealand	Win
2011	Quarter-finals	Japan 2–3 Brazil	Loss
2013	Group stage	Japan 1–0 Russia	Win
2013	Group stage	Japan 3–1 Venezuela	Win
2013	Group stage	Japan 2–1 Tunisia	Win
2013	Round of 16	Japan 1–2 Sweden	Loss
2017	Group stage	Japan 6–1 Honduras	Win
2017	Group stage	Japan 1–2 France	Loss
2017	Group stage	Japan 1–1 New Caledonia	Draw
2017	Round of 16	Japan 0–0 England	Draw
2019	Group stage	Japan 3–0 Netherlands	Win
2019	Group stage	Japan 0–0 United States	Draw
2019	Group stage	Japan 1–0 Senegal	Win
2019	Round of 16	Japan 0–2 Mexico	Loss
2023	Group stage	Japan 1–0 Poland	Win
2023	Group stage	Japan 1–3 Argentina	Loss
2023	Group stage	Japan 2–0 Senegal	Win
2023	Round of 16	Japan 1–2 Spain	Loss
2025	Group stage	Japan 2–0 Morocco	Win
2025	Group stage	Japan 0–0 New Caledonia	Draw
2025	Group stage	Japan 2–1 Portugal	Win
2025	Round of 32	Japan 3–0 South Africa	Win
2025	Round of 16	Japan 1–1 North Korea (Win 5–4 on penalties)	Draw (Win)
2025	Quarter-finals	Japan 0–1 Austria	Loss
2026	Group stage	Japan 1–2 Colombia	Loss
2026	Group stage	Japan – Serbia	
2026	Group stage	Japan – Honduras	

=== AFC U-17 Asian Cup ===
Year	Result	Pld	W	D	L	GF	GA
(Qatar) 1985	Group stage	1	0	0	1	0	3
(Qatar) 1986	Did not qualify						
(Thailand) 1988	Group stage	4	1	1	2	4	8
(United Arab Emirates) 1990	Did not enter						
(Saudi Arabia) 1992	Did not qualify						
(Qatar) 1994	Champions	6	4	0	2	13	9
(Thailand) 1996	Fourth place	6	3	2	1	13	7
(Qatar) 1998	Group stage	4	2	1	1	8	6
(Vietnam) 2000	Third place	6	5	0	1	20	6
(United Arab Emirates) 2002	Group stage	3	1	0	2	3	5
(Japan) 2004	Group stage	3	1	1	1	4	3
(Singapore) 2006	Champions	6	4	2	0	17	6
(Uzbekistan) 2008	Semi-finals	5	4	0	1	16	3
(Uzbekistan) 2010	Semi-finals	5	3	1	1	11	3
(Iran) 2012	Runners-up	6	4	1	1	14	6
(Thailand) 2014	Quarter-finals	4	2	0	2	7	6
(India) 2016	Semi-finals	5	4	0	1	24	4
(Malaysia) 2018	Champions	6	5	1	0	13	4
(Thailand) 2023	Champions	6	5	1	0	22	6
(Saudi Arabia) 2025	Quarter-finals	4	1	2	1	9	7
(Saudi Arabia) 2026	Champions	6	5	1	0	17	6
(Uzbekistan) 2027	Qualified						
(Saudi Arabia) 2028	To be determined						
(Saudi Arabia) 2029	To be determined						
Total:19/24	5 titles	86	54	14	18	215	98

AFC U-17 Asian Cup history
Year	Round	Score	Result
1985	Group stage	Japan 0–3 Saudi Arabia	Loss
1988	Group stage	Japan 0–2 China	Loss
1988	Group stage	Japan 0–0 Iraq	Draw
1988	Group stage	Japan 3–2 North Korea	Win
1988	Group stage	Japan 1–4 Qatar	Loss
1994	Group stage	Japan 2–5 United Arab Emirates	Loss
1994	Group stage	Japan 0–1 Iraq	Loss
1994	Group stage	Japan 3–0 South Korea	Win
1994	Group stage	Japan 3–0 Bahrain	Win
1994	Semifinals	Japan 4–3 Oman	Win
1994	Final	Japan 1–0 Qatar	Win
1996	Group stage	Japan 2–2 Oman	Draw
1996	Group stage	Japan 3–2 South Korea	Win
1996	Group stage	Japan 5–2 Kuwait	Win
1996	Group stage	Japan 3–0 Uzbekistan	Win
1996	Semifinals	Japan 0–1 Thailand	Loss
1996	Third place	Japan 0–0 Bahrain	Draw
1998	Group stage	Japan 1–2 South Korea	Loss
1998	Group stage	Japan 2–1 Bahrain	Win
1998	Group stage	Japan 3–1 Oman	Win
1998	Group stage	Japan 2–2 Bangladesh	Draw
2000	Group stage	Japan 2–0 Vietnam	Win
2000	Group stage	Japan 2–0 Myanmar	Win
2000	Group stage	Japan 3–0 Nepal	Win
2000	Group stage	Japan 7–1 China	Win
2000	Semifinals	Japan 2–3 Oman	Loss
2000	Third place	Japan 4–2 Vietnam	Win
2002	Group stage	Japan 1–2 Uzbekistan	Loss
2002	Group stage	Japan 1–3 Qatar	Loss
2002	Group stage	Japan 1–0 Syria	Win
2004	Group stage	Japan 0–0 North Korea	Draw
2004	Group stage	Japan 1–2 Thailand	Loss
2004	Group stage	Japan 3–1 China	Win
2006	Group stage	Japan 6–0 Nepal	Win
2006	Group stage	Japan 1–1 Singapore	Draw
2006	Group stage	Japan 3–2 South Korea	Win
2006	Quarterfinals	Japan 1–1 Iran	Draw
2006	Semifinals	Japan 2–0 Syria	Win
2006	Final	Japan 4–2 North Korea	Win
2008	Group stage	Japan 4–0 Malaysia	Win
2008	Group stage	Japan 6–1 United Arab Emirates	Win
2008	Group stage	Japan 3–0 Yemen	Win
2008	Quarterfinals	Japan 2–0 Saudi Arabia	Win
2008	Semifinals	Japan 1–2 South Korea	Loss
2010	Group stage	Japan 6–0 Vietnam	Win
2010	Group stage	Japan 1–0 Timor-Leste	Win
2010	Group stage	Japan 0–0 Australia	Draw
2010	Quarterfinals	Japan 3–1 Iraq	Win
2010	Semifinals	Japan 1–2 North Korea	Loss
2012	Group stage	Japan 2–0 Saudi Arabia	Win
2012	Group stage	Japan 1–3 South Korea	Loss
2012	Group stage	Japan 3–0 North Korea	Win
2012	Quarterfinals	Japan 2–1 Syria	Win
2012	Semifinals	Japan 5–1 Iraq	Win
2012	Final	Japan 1–1 Uzbekistan	Draw
2014	Group stage	Japan 2–0 Hong Kong	Win
2014	Group stage	Japan 3–0 China	Win
2014	Group stage	Japan 2–4 Australia	Loss
2014	Quarterfinals	Japan 0–2 South Korea	Loss
2016	Group stage	Japan 7–0 Vietnam	Win
2016	Group stage	Japan 8–0 Kyrgyzstan	Win
2016	Group stage	Japan 6–0 Australia	Win
2016	Quarterfinals	Japan 1–0 United Arab Emirates	Win
2016	Semifinals	Japan 2–4 Iraq	Loss
2018	Group stage	Japan 5–2 Thailand	Win
2018	Group stage	Japan 0–0 Tajikistan	Draw
2018	Group stage	Japan 2–0 Malaysia	Win
2018	Quarterfinals	Japan 2–1 Oman	Win
2018	Semifinals	Japan 3–1 Australia	Win
2018	Final	Japan 1–0 Tajikistan	Win
2023	Group stage	Japan 1–1 Uzbekistan	Draw
2023	Group stage	Japan 4–0 Vietnam	Win
2023	Group stage	Japan 8–4 India	Win
2023	Quarterfinals	Japan 3–1 Australia	Win
2023	Semifinals	Japan 3–0 Iran	Win
2023	Final	Japan 3–0 South Korea	Win
2025	Group stage	Japan 4–1 United Arab Emirates	Win
2025	Group stage	Japan 1–1 Vietnam	Draw
2025	Group stage	Japan 2–3 Australia	Loss
2025	Quarterfinals	Japan 2–2 Saudi Arabia	Draw
2026	Group stage	Japan 3–1 Qatar	Win
2026	Group stage	Japan 2–1 China	Win
2026	Group stage	Japan 3–1 Indonesia	Win
2026	Quarterfinals	Japan 5–0 Tajikistan	Win
2026	Semifinals	Japan 1–1 Uzbekistan	Draw
2026	Final	Japan 3–2 China	Win
2027	Group stage	Japan –	
2027	Group stage	Japan –	
2027	Group stage	Japan –	

== Head-to-head record ==
The following table shows Japan's head-to-head record in the FIFA U-17 World Cup and AFC U-17 Asian Cup.

=== In FIFA U-17 World Cup ===
Opponent	Pld	W	D	L	GF	GA	GD	Win %
Argentina	2	1	0	1	4	4	+0	50.00
Austria					—			
Brazil	2	0	0	2	4	6	−2	0.00
Ecuador	1	0	1	0	0	0	+0	0.00
England	1	0	1	0	0	0	+0	0.00
France	4	0	1	3	4	10	−6	0.00
Ghana	2	0	0	2	0	2	−2	0.00
Haiti	1	1	0	0	3	1	+2	100.00
Honduras	1	1	0	0	6	1	+5	100.00
Italy	1	0	1	0	0	0	+0	0.00
Jamaica	1	1	0	0	1	0	+1	100.00
Mexico	3	1	0	2	2	5	−3	33.33
Morocco	1	1	0	0	2	0	+2	100.00
Netherlands	1	1	0	0	3	0	+3	100.00
New Caledonia	2	0	2	0	1	1	+0	0.00
New Zealand	1	1	0	0	6	0	+6	100.00
Nigeria	3	0	0	3	1	9	−8	0.00
North Korea	1	0	1	0	1	1	+0	0.00
Poland	1	1	0	0	1	0	+1	100.00
Portugal	1	1	0	0	2	1	+1	100.00
Russia	1	1	0	0	1	0	+1	100.00
Senegal	2	2	0	0	3	0	+3	100.00
South Africa	1	1	0	0	3	0	+3	100.00
Spain	1	0	0	1	1	2	−1	0.00
Sweden	1	0	0	1	1	2	−1	0.00
Switzerland	1	0	0	1	3	4	−1	0.00
Tunisia	1	1	0	0	2	1	+1	100.00
United States	3	2	1	0	3	1	+2	66.67
Venezuela	1	1	0	0	3	1	+2	100.00
Total	42	18	8	16	61	52	+9	42.86

=== In AFC U-17 Asian Cup ===
Opponent	Pld	W	D	L	GF	GA	GD	Win %
Australia	6	3	1	2	16	9	+7	50.00
Bahrain	3	2	1	0	5	1	+4	66.67
Bangladesh	1	0	1	0	2	2	+0	0.00
China	4	3	0	1	13	4	+9	75.00
Hong Kong	1	1	0	0	2	0	+2	100.00
India	1	1	0	0	8	4	+4	100.00
Iran	2	1	1	0	4	1	+3	50.00
Iraq	5	2	1	2	10	7	+3	40.00
Kuwait	1	1	0	0	5	2	+3	100.00
Kyrgyzstan	1	1	0	0	8	0	+8	100.00
Malaysia	2	2	0	0	6	0	+6	100.00
Myanmar	1	1	0	0	2	0	+2	100.00
Nepal	2	2	0	0	9	0	+9	100.00
North Korea	5	3	1	1	11	6	+5	60.00
Oman	5	3	1	1	13	10	+3	60.00
Qatar	3	1	0	2	3	7	−4	33.33
Saudi Arabia	4	2	1	1	6	5	+1	50.00
Singapore	1	0	1	0	1	1	+0	0.00
South Korea	8	4	0	4	15	13	+2	50.00
Syria	3	3	0	0	5	1	+4	100.00
Tajikistan	2	1	1	0	1	0	+1	50.00
Thailand	3	1	0	2	6	5	+1	33.332
Timor-Leste	1	1	0	0	1	0	+1	100.00
United Arab Emirates	4	3	0	1	13	7	+6	75.00
Uzbekistan	4	1	2	1	6	4	+2	25.00
Vietnam	6	5	1	0	24	3	+21	83.33
Yemen	1	1	0	0	3	0	+3	100.00
Total	80	49	13	18	198	92	+106	61.25

== See also ==
Japan
Men's

- International footballers
- National football team (Results (2020–present))
- National under-23 football team
- National under-20 football team
- National futsal team
- National under-20 futsal team
- National beach soccer team

Women's

- International footballers
- National football team (Results)
- National under-20 football team
- National under-17 football team
- National futsal team
