= 2022 U-16 International Dream Cup =

Japanese: U-16 インターナショナルドリームカップ

Tournament details
- Host country: Japan
- City: Sendai
- Dates: 8–12 June 2022
- Teams: 4 (from 3 confederations)
- Venue(s): 1 (in 1 host city)

Final positions
- Champions: Japan (4th title)

Tournament statistics
- Matches played: 6
- Goals scored: 17 (2.83 per match)
- Top scorer(s): (Japan) Gaku Nawata (Japan) Mark Isozaki (2 goals each)

The 2022 U-16 International Dream Cup (officially in Japanese: U-16 インターナショナルドリームカップ2022 JAPAN presented by JFA), was the 6th edition of the U-16 International Dream Cup, an annual, international, age-restricted football tournament organized by the JFA, Japanese football's governing body. It was held in Sendai, Japan from 8 June to 12 June 2022. Japan were crowned champions for the 4th time, in an unbeaten three-win campaign.

== Format ==
The four invited teams played a round-robin tournament. A penalty-shootout were played when the match resulted in a draw. Points awarded in the group stage followed the formula of three points for a win, two points for a penalty-shootout win, one point for a penalty-shootout loss, and zero points for a loss. In the event, if two teams were tied in points, tie-breakers would be applied in the order of goal difference, goals scored, head-to-head result, and a fair play score based on the number of yellow and red cards.

== Venue ==
Sendai
Yurtec Stadium Sendai
Capacity: 19,694
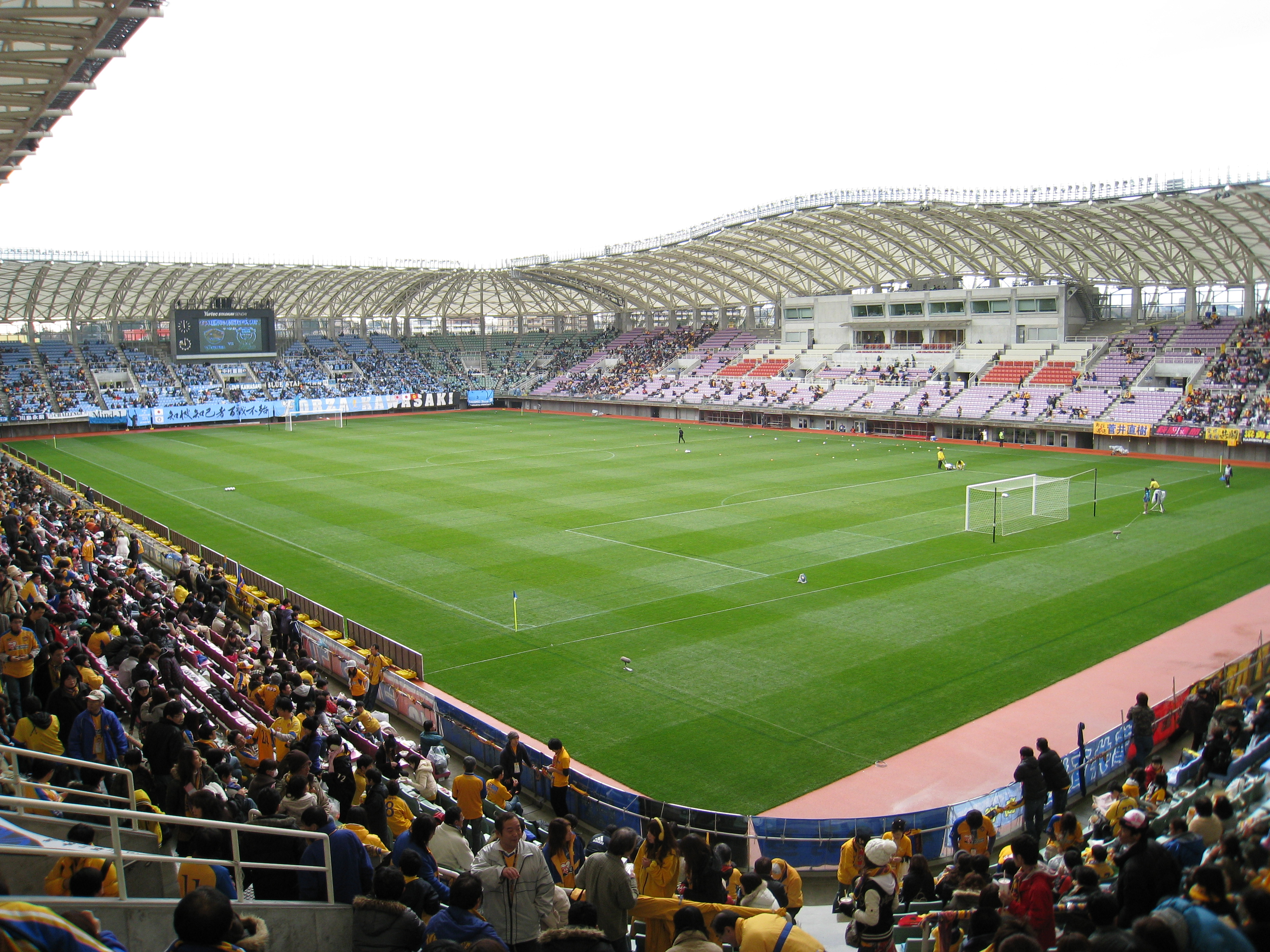

== Teams ==
Team	Confederation
Japan	AFC
South Korea	AFC
Mexico	CONCACAF
Uruguay	CONMEBOL

== Standings ==
Pos	Team	Pld	W	DW	DL	L	GF	GA	GD	Pts
1st place, gold medalist(s)	Japan (H)	3	3	0	0	0	9	0	+9	9
2nd place, silver medalist(s)	Mexico	3	1	1	0	1	5	5	0	5
3rd place, bronze medalist(s)	South Korea	3	0	0	2	1	3	6	−3	2
4	Uruguay	3	0	1	0	2	0	6	−6	2

Updated to match(es) played on 12 June 2022. Source: JFA
Rules for classification: 1) points; 2) goal difference; 3) goals scored; 4) head-to-head result; 5) fair play ranking.
(H) Host

== Results ==
8 June 2022
15:00

Mexico	2–0	Uruguay
Valencia 79'; Garcia 84'	Report (JFA)

Yurtec Stadium Sendai, Sendai
Attendance: 535
Referee: Takeshi Tsukahara (Japan)
8 June 2022
18:00

Japan	3–0	South Korea
Yada 7'; Isozaki 40'; Sugiura 51'	Report (JFA)

Yurtec Stadium Sendai, Sendai
Attendance: 2,328
Referee: Koji Takasaki (Japan)

10 June 2022
15:00

South Korea	3–3	Mexico
Kim Min-sung 47'; Kim Myeong-jun 52'; Yang Min-hyeok 65'	Report (JFA)	Camacho 7'; Carrillo 25'; Barajas 47'
Penalties
Kim Seung-hyun (penalty scored); Kim Min-sung (penalty missed); Park In-woo (penalty missed); Choi On-yoo (penalty missed)	1–3	(penalty missed) Urias; (penalty scored) Flores; (penalty scored) Bolaños; (penalty scored) Azcarate

Yurtec Stadium Sendai, Sendai
Attendance: 403
Referee: Kentaro Uematsu (Japan)
10 June 2022
18:00

Japan	4–0	Uruguay
Nawata 7', 39'; Michiwaki 34'; Nakajima 90'	Report (JFA)

Yurtec Stadium Sendai, Sendai
Attendance: 2,508
Referee: Yuki Tanabe (Japan)

12 June 2022
11:30

Uruguay	0–0	South Korea
	Report (JFA)
Penalties
Peralta (penalty scored); Fuentes (penalty scored); Anso (penalty missed); Dominguez (penalty scored)	3–1	(penalty scored) Kang Min-woo (footballer, born 2006); (penalty missed) Moon Ji-won; (penalty missed) Kim Seung-hyun; (penalty missed) Lee Seo-jun

Yurtec Stadium Sendai, Sendai
Attendance: 1,081
Referee: Takahito Seta (Japan)
12 June 2022
14:30

Japan	2–0	Mexico
Sato 54'; Isozaki 69'	Report (JFA)

Yurtec Stadium Sendai, Sendai
Attendance: 4,056
Referee: Yasuyuki Matsumoto (Japan)

== Statistics ==
=== Goalscorers ===
As of 12 June 2022

There have been 17 goals scored in 6 matches, for an average of 2.83 goals per match.

2 goals

- (Japan) Mark Isozaki
- (Japan) Gaku Nawata

1 goal

- (Japan) Yutaka Michiwaki
- (Japan) Yotaro Nakajima
- (Japan) Ryunosuke Sato
- (Japan) Shungo Sugiura
- (Japan) Ryunosuke Yada
- (Mexico) Junior Barajas
- (Mexico) Gabriel Camacho
- (Mexico) Emmanuel Carrillo
- (Mexico) Emilio Garcia
- (Mexico) Álex Valencia
- (South Korea) Kim Min-sung
- (South Korea) Kim Myeong-jun
- (South Korea) Yang Min-hyeok

== See also ==
- Japan Football Association (JFA)
