= Yutaka Michiwaki =

Japanese footballer (born 2006)

Yutaka Michiwaki 道脇 豊
Personal information
- Full name: Yutaka Michiwaki
- Date of birth: 5 April 2006 (age 20)
- Place of birth: Kumamoto, Japan
- Height: 1.90 m (6 ft 3 in)
- Position: Striker

Team information
- Current team: Iwaki FC (on loan from Avispa Fukuoka)
- Number: 9

Youth career
- Taiyo SC Kumamoto
- –2022: Roasso Kumamoto

Senior career*
Years	Team	Apps	(Gls)
2023–2025	Roasso Kumamoto	27	(1)
2024–2025	→ SK Beveren (loan)	28	(4)
2026–	Avispa Fukuoka	13	(1)
2026–	→ Iwaki FC (loan)	6	(1)

International career^{‡}
2022–2026	Japan U17	24	(15)
2025	Japan U20	8	(0)
2025	Japan U22	1	(0)
2026–	Japan U23	11	(1)
Medal record
Men's football
Representing Japan
AFC U-23 Asian Cup
Gold medal – first place	2026 Saudi Arabia
AFC U-17 Asian Cup
Gold medal – first place	2023 Thailand
U-16 International Dream Cup
Gold medal – first place	2022 Japan
Asian Games
Silver medal – second place	2026 Aichi–Nagoya
- * Club domestic league appearances and goals as of 19:15, 12 September 2026 (UTC) ‡ National team caps and goals as of 3 October 2026

Yutaka Michiwaki (道脇 豊, Michiwaki Yutaka; born 5 April 2006) is a Japanese professional footballer who plays as a striker for J2 League club Iwaki FC, on loan from Avispa Fukuoka.

== Club career ==
In December 2022, Michiwaki became the youngest player to sign a professional contract with J2 League side Roasso Kumamoto, at the age of sixteen. On 19 February of the same year, he made his professional debut for the club, coming on as a substitute for Shohei Aihara in a 1–1 league draw with Tochigi SC.

== International career ==
Michiwaki has represented Japan at under-16 and under-17 levels.

In June 2023, he was included in the Japanese squad for the 2023 AFC U-17 Asian Cup in Thailand; he became one of the Samurai Blue's most notable players throughout the tournament, and scored the last goal in a 3–0 win over South Korea in the final, which allowed Japan to lift their fourth continental title.

== Career statistics ==
=== Club ===
As of 12 September 2026.

Appearances and goals by club, season and competition
Club	Season	League			National cup (Note: Includes Emperors Cup and Belgian Cup)		League cup (Note: Includes J.League Cup)		Total	
Club	Season	Division	Apps	Goals	Apps	Goals	Apps	Goals	Apps	Goals
Roasso Kumamoto	2022	J2 League	0	0	0	0	0	0	0	0
Roasso Kumamoto	2023	J2 League	18	0	3	2	0	0	21	2
Roasso Kumamoto	2024	J2 League	9	1	0	0	1	0	10	1
Roasso Kumamoto	Total		27	1	3	2	1	0	31	3
SK Beveren (loan)	2024–25	Challenger Pro League	21	3	2	1	0	0	23	4
SK Beveren (loan)	2025–26	Challenger Pro League	7	1	1	0	0	0	8	1
SK Beveren (loan)	Total		28	4	3	1	0	0	31	5
Avispa Fukuoka	2026	J1 (100)	13	1	–		–		13	1
Iwaki FC (loan)	2026–27	J2 League	6	1	0	0	0	0	6	1
Career total			74	7	6	3	1	0	81	10

== Honours ==
Japan U17

- AFC U-17 Asian Cup: 2023

Japan U23

- AFC U-23 Asian Cup: 2026
