= U-16 International Dream Cup =

- Organiser(s): JFA
- Founded: 2015; 11 years ago
- Region: Japan
- Teams: 4
- Current champions: Japan (8th title)
- Most championships: Japan (8 titles)
- Broadcaster: J Sports
- Website: Official website
- 2026 U-16 International Dream Cup

The U-16 International Dream Cup (Japanese: U-16インターナショナルドリームカップ) is an international youth football competition hosted by the Japan Football Association (JFA), which was established in 2015.

== Results ==
Edition	Year	Champions	Runners-up	Third place	Fourth place	Location
1	2015 details	Japan	Chile	France	Costa Rica	Sakai, Osaka
2	2016 details	Mali	Japan	Hungary	Mexico	Tottori, Tottori
3	2017 details	Japan	Netherlands	Guinea	United States	Sendai, Miyagi
4	2018 details	Spain	Paraguay	Senegal	Japan	Sendai, Miyagi
5	2019 details	Japan	Romania	Nigeria	Mexico	Sendai, Miyagi
—	2020	Cancelled				
—	2021	Cancelled				
6	2022 details	Japan	Mexico	South Korea	Uruguay	Sendai, Miyagi
7	2023 details	Japan	Netherlands	United States	Nigeria	Hirono, Fukushima; Naraha, Fukushima
8	2024 details	Japan	Venezuela	Ukraine	Senegal	Hirono, Fukushima; Naraha, Fukushima
9	2025 details	Japan	France	Ivory Coast	Colombia	Hirono, Fukushima; Naraha, Fukushima
10	2026 details	Japan	Argentina	France	Ivory Coast	Hirono, Fukushima; Naraha, Fukushima

== See also ==
- Japan Football Association (JFA)
- Japan national football team
- Japan national under-23 football team
- Japan national under-20 football team
- Japan national under-17 football team
