= J-Village Stadium =

Football stadium in Japan

Coordinates: 37°14′20″N 141°0′11.5″E

- Jヴィレッジスタジアム
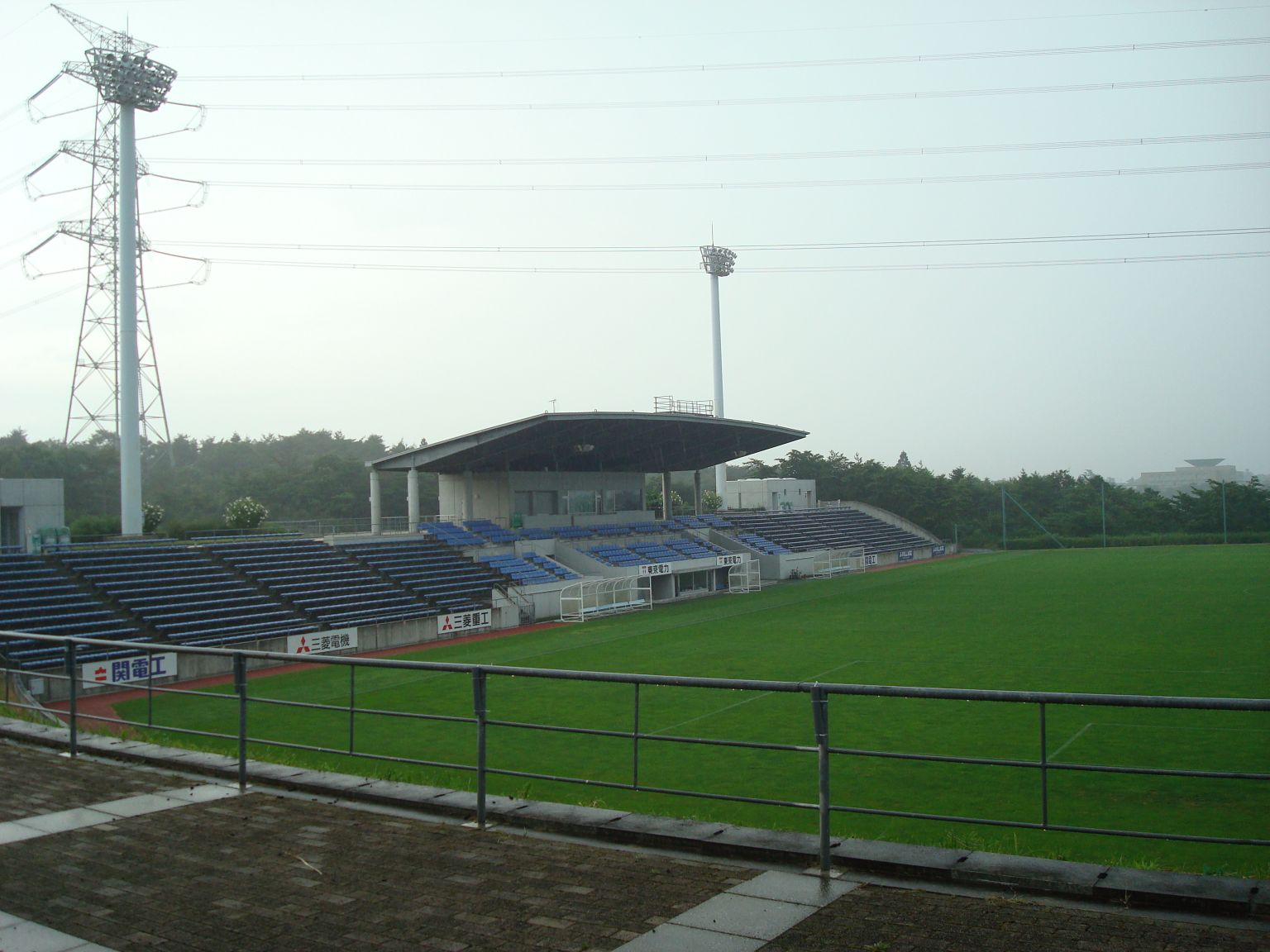
- Interactive map of J-Village Stadium
- Full name: National Training Center J-Village
- Location: Hirono, Fukushima and Naraha, Fukushima, Japan
- Capacity: 5,000

Construction
- Opened: 1993
- Renovated: 2018

Tenants
- Iwaki FC; TEPCO Mareeze (1997–2010); JFA Academy Fukushima

Website
- Official site

J-Village Stadium (Jヴィレッジスタジアム) is a football stadium located in Hirono, Fukushima and Naraha, Fukushima, Japan.

It was one of the home stadium of football club TEPCO Mareeze. It was used J2 League game between Montedio Yamagata and Shonan Bellmare on April 16, 2005.

In 2022, the J. League authorized Iwaki FC to use the stadium as its home ground in preparation for their promotion to J2 League as champions of J3 League.

== See also ==
- J-Village Station
