= Naraha, Fukushima =

Naraha 楢葉町
- Town
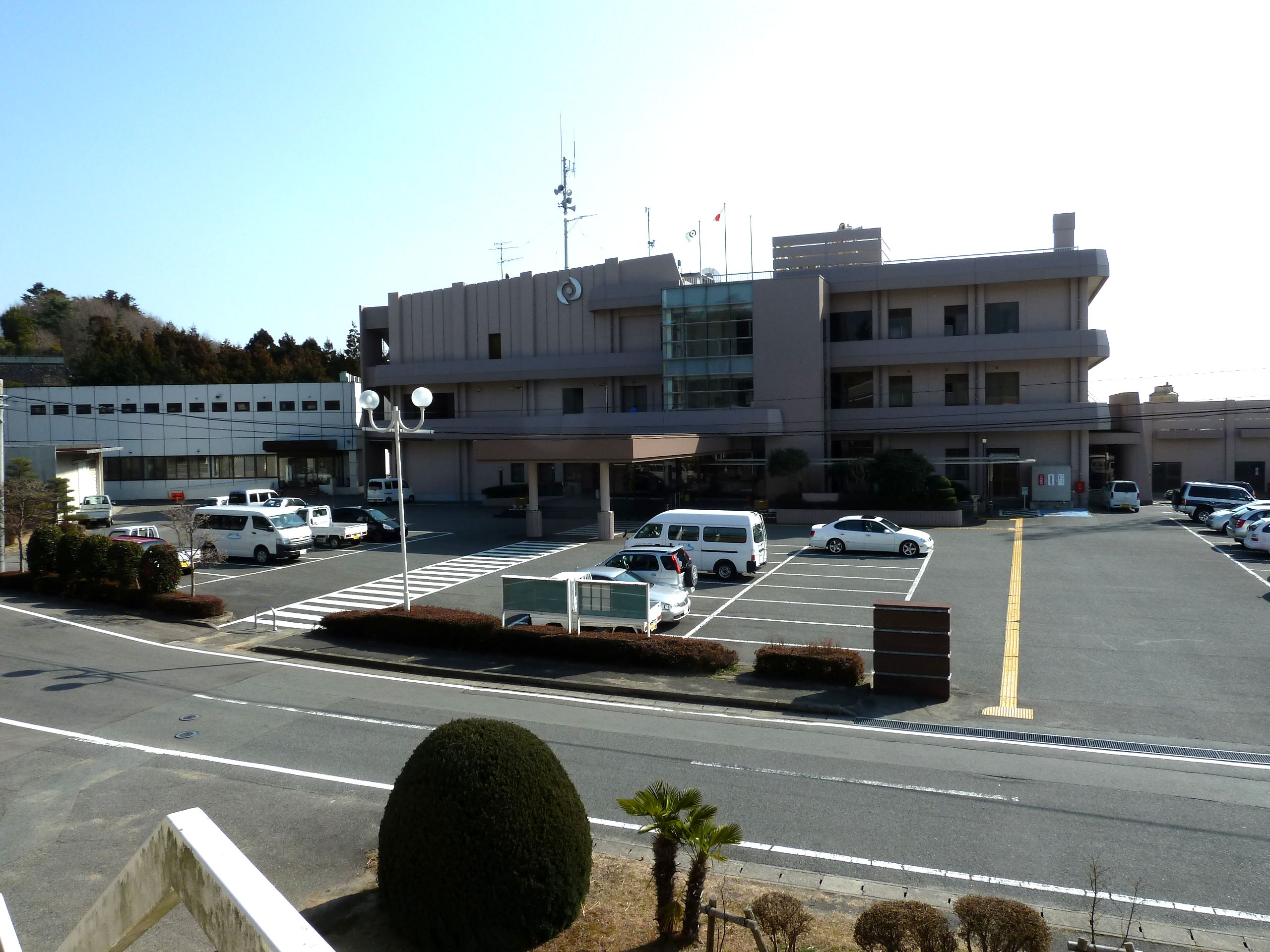
- Naraha Town Hall, February 2011

- Flag Seal

- Location of Naraha in Fukushima Prefecture

- Coordinates: 37°16′57″N 140°59′37″E
- Country: Japan
- Region: Tōhoku
- Prefecture: Fukushima
- District: Futaba

Area
  - Total: 103.64 km^{2} (40.02 sq mi)

Population (March 31, 2020)
  - Total: 6,784
  - Density: 65.46/km^{2} (169.5/sq mi)
- Time zone: UTC+9 (Japan Standard Time)
- Symbols
  - Tree: Cryptomeria
  - Flower: Lilium auratum
  - Bird: Japanese bush-warbler
- Phone number: 0246-25-5561
- Address: Kitada Kanetsukido 5-6, Naraha-machi, Futaba-gun, Fukushima-ken 979-0692
- Website: Official website

Naraha (楢葉町, Naraha-machi) is a town located in Fukushima Prefecture, Japan. As of 1 July 2024, the town had an official registered population of 6,465 in 3,182 households, and a population density of 65 persons per km^{2}, although the current actual resident population is significantly smaller. The total area of the town is 103.64 square kilometres (40.02 sq mi). From 2011 until 2015, the town was evacuated due to fallout from the Fukushima Daiichi nuclear disaster. While the town wasn't severely contaminated by the fallout, restrictions on residency were held until September 2015 when cleanup efforts concluded, allowing people to return. Naraha is the first of several towns and cities near Fukushima Daiichi Nuclear Power Plant to have been reopened to residents. Repair and reconstruction efforts have been underway in Naraha since 2016, and numerous landmarks in the town have been rebuilt and reopened.

== Geography ==
Naraha is located in southern of Fukushima Prefecture, bordering on the Pacific Ocean to the east.

=== Surrounding municipalities ===
- Fukushima Prefecture
  - Iwaki
  - Hirono
  - Kawauchi
  - Tomioka

== Demographics ==
Per Japanese census data, the population of Naraha remained relatively steady for the 40 years prior to the nuclear disaster.

Historical population
| Year | Pop. | ±% |
|---|---|---|
| 1920 | 7,011 | — |
| 1930 | 7,513 | +7.2% |
| 1940 | 7,692 | +2.4% |
| 1950 | 11,695 | +52.0% |
| 1960 | 9,477 | −19.0% |
| 1970 | 8,215 | −13.3% |
| 1980 | 8,366 | +1.8% |
| 1990 | 8,322 | −0.5% |
| 2000 | 8,380 | +0.7% |
| 2010 | 8,188 | −2.3% |
| 2020 | 3,710 | −54.7% |

== Climate ==
Naraha has a humid subtropical climate (Köppen climate classification Cfa). The average annual temperature in Naraha is 11.9 °C (53.4 °F). The average annual rainfall is 1,371 mm (54.0 in) with September as the wettest month. The temperatures are highest on average in August, at around 23.8 °C (74.8 °F), and lowest in January, at around 1.3 °C (34.3 °F).

== History ==
The area of present-day Naraha was part of Mutsu Province, and was included in the tenryō holdings of the Tokugawa shogunate during Edo period Japan. After the Meiji restoration, on April 1, 1889, the villages of Kido and Tatsuta was created within Naraha District, Fukushima with the establishment of the modern municipalities system. Naraha District became Futaba District in 1896. The villages of Kido and Tatsuta merged in 1956 to form the town of Naraha.

=== 2011 earthquake and tsunami ===
Naraha suffered great devastation as a result of the March 11 earthquake and subsequent tsunami. As a result of the Fukushima Daiichi nuclear disaster, as well as problems experienced with its cooling facility of the Fukushima Daini Nuclear Power Plant (see timeline), the town was totally evacuated by order of the town government. The entire area of the town fell within the 20 kilometer exclusion zone around the Fukushima Daiichi Power Plant. On August 1, 2012, the government eased the restriction order by allowing residents to visit their homes during daylight hours, but not permitting overnight stays. In March 2014, Naraha completed decontamination work in its residential areas, although radiation levels remained high in some areas of the town, and many buildings were still in ruins. By April 2015, residents could stay overnight if they applied for permission, and the evacuation order was lifted completely effective September 4, 2015. Reconstruction efforts in the town commenced in 2016.

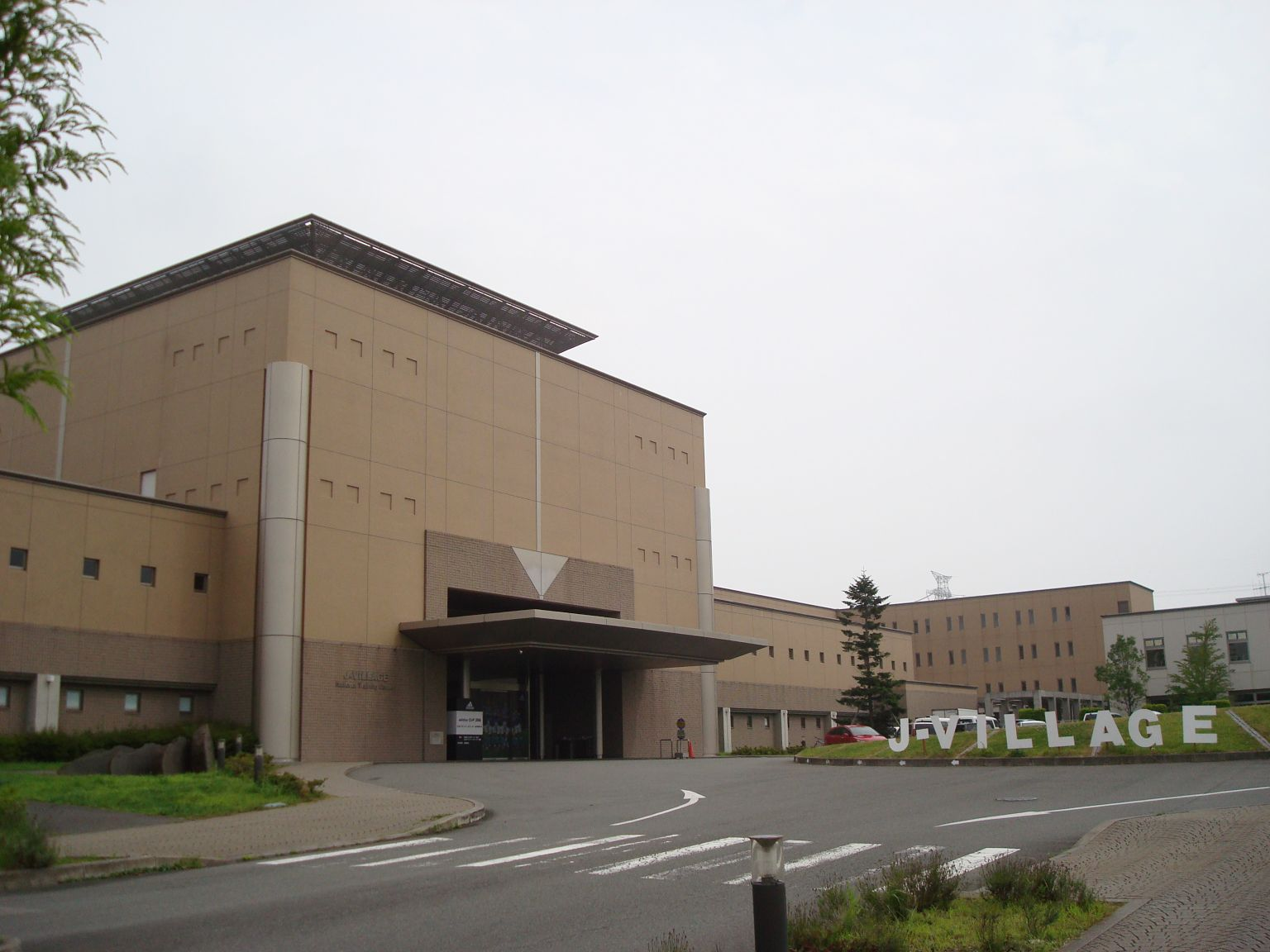
J-Village Center House

Naraha is listed among several neighbouring towns as a 'special zone for reconstruction and revitalisation'; as repair works are underway, several key milestones were met in the years following the evacuation order being lifted. In April 2018, the town's Elementary and Junior High schools were reopened, while in July, J-Village was fully repaired and opened to the public.

== Economy ==
The economy of Naraha was formerly heavily dependent on agriculture. The Fukushima Daini Nuclear Power Plant was also a major employer.

== Education ==
Naraha had two public elementary schools and one public middle school in March 2011.

== Transportation ==
=== Railway ===
JR East – Jōban Line

- J-Village - Kido – Tatsuta

=== Highway ===
- Jōban Expressway – Naraha Parking Area and Smart Interchange
- National Route 6

== Local attractions ==
Among other attractions, Naraha houses J-Village, a state-of-the-art sports training and convention facility that also houses a hotel, restaurant and public bath. The Argentina National Football Team stayed at J-Village for the 2002 World Cup. Naraha also houses one of Japan's fifty-seven cycling terminals and an onsen.

== International relations ==
- Wuchang, China, since 1992
- Euclid, Ohio, United States, since 1993.
