= Hirono, Fukushima =

Hirono 広野町
- Town
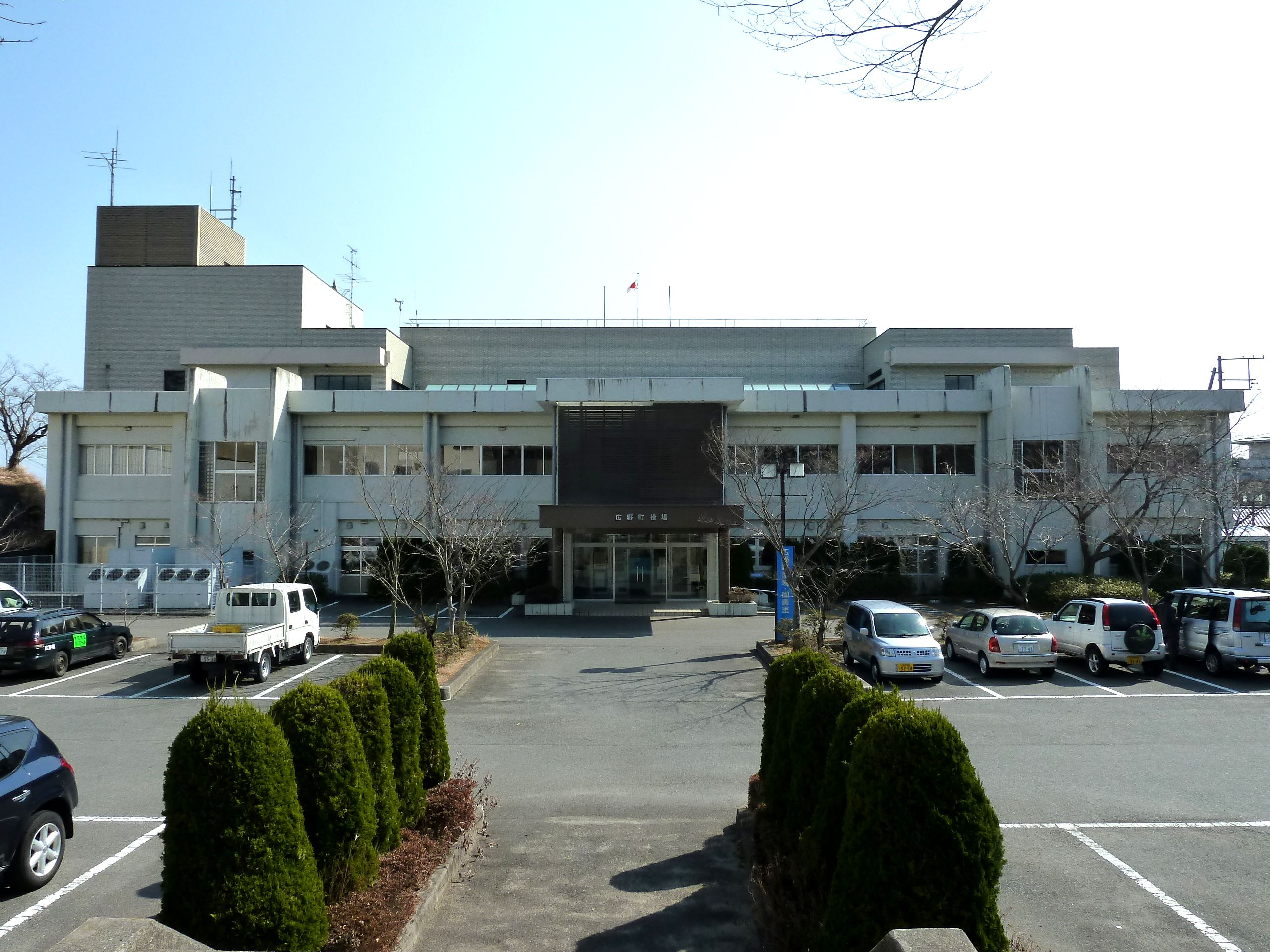
- Hirono Town Hall, February 2011

- Flag Seal

- Location of Hirono in Fukushima Prefecture

- Coordinates: 37°12′52″N 140°59′41″E
- Country: Japan
- Region: Tōhoku
- Prefecture: Fukushima
- District: Futaba

Area
  - Total: 58.69 km^{2} (22.66 sq mi)

Population (March 31, 2020)
  - Total: 4,755
  - Density: 81.02/km^{2} (209.8/sq mi)
- Time zone: UTC+9 (Japan Standard Time)
- Phone number: 0240-27-2111
- Address: Shimokitaba Nawashirogai 35, Hirono-machi, Futaba-gun, Fukushima-ken 979-0402
- Climate: Cfa
- Website: Official website
- Symbols
- Bird: Japanese white-eye
- Flower: Lilium auratum
- Tree: Sakura

Hirono (広野町, Hirono-machi) is a town located in Fukushima Prefecture, Japan. As of 31 March 2020, the town had an official registered population of 4,755 in 2,267 households, and a population density of 81 persons per km^{2}. The total area of the town is 58.69 square kilometres (22.66 sq mi).

== Geography ==
Hirono is located in southern of Fukushima Prefecture, bordering on the Pacific Ocean to the east.

=== Climate ===
Hirono has a Humid subtropical climate (Köppen Cfa) characterized by mild summers and cold winters with heavy snowfall. The average annual temperature in Hirono is 11.4 °C. The average annual rainfall is 1413 mm with September as the wettest month. The temperatures are highest on average in August, at around 23.3 °C, and lowest in January, at around 0.9 °C.

Climate data for Hirono (1991−2020 normals, extremes 1976−present)
Month	Jan	Feb	Mar	Apr	May	Jun	Jul	Aug	Sep	Oct	Nov	Dec	Year
Record high °C (°F)	18.4 (65.1)	22.8 (73.0)	23.9 (75.0)	28.2 (82.8)	31.8 (89.2)	34.9 (94.8)	37.3 (99.1)	37.0 (98.6)	35.2 (95.4)	31.6 (88.9)	25.7 (78.3)	23.0 (73.4)	37.3 (99.1)
Mean daily maximum °C (°F)	7.9 (46.2)	8.2 (46.8)	11.0 (51.8)	15.6 (60.1)	19.6 (67.3)	22.3 (72.1)	26.1 (79.0)	27.7 (81.9)	24.9 (76.8)	20.3 (68.5)	15.6 (60.1)	10.7 (51.3)	17.5 (63.5)
Daily mean °C (°F)	3.3 (37.9)	3.5 (38.3)	6.3 (43.3)	10.9 (51.6)	15.3 (59.5)	18.6 (65.5)	22.4 (72.3)	24.0 (75.2)	21.1 (70.0)	16.0 (60.8)	10.8 (51.4)	5.9 (42.6)	13.2 (55.7)
Mean daily minimum °C (°F)	−1.3 (29.7)	−1.2 (29.8)	1.4 (34.5)	6.1 (43.0)	11.0 (51.8)	15.3 (59.5)	19.5 (67.1)	21.1 (70.0)	17.7 (63.9)	11.9 (53.4)	6.0 (42.8)	1.0 (33.8)	9.0 (48.3)
Record low °C (°F)	−10.5 (13.1)	−10.2 (13.6)	−6.9 (19.6)	−3.8 (25.2)	0.8 (33.4)	5.5 (41.9)	10.4 (50.7)	10.6 (51.1)	7.9 (46.2)	−0.2 (31.6)	−4.2 (24.4)	−7.5 (18.5)	−10.5 (13.1)
Average precipitation mm (inches)	58.3 (2.30)	51.4 (2.02)	109.5 (4.31)	133.8 (5.27)	151.5 (5.96)	165.3 (6.51)	191.3 (7.53)	143.5 (5.65)	222.7 (8.77)	227.1 (8.94)	85.7 (3.37)	52.2 (2.06)	1,600.3 (63.00)
Average precipitation days (≥ 1.0 mm)	4.8	5.1	9.0	9.7	10.5	12.1	13.0	10.6	12.5	10.6	6.8	5.2	109.9
Mean monthly sunshine hours	189.9	183.2	191.0	192.4	194.1	151.6	147.5	175.0	137.5	144.8	160.3	174.7	2,041.7
Source: Japan Meteorological Agency

=== Surrounding municipalities ===
- Fukushima Prefecture
  - Iwaki
  - Naraha

== Demographics ==
Per Japanese census data, the population of Hirono has remained relatively steady for the past 60 years.

Historical population
Year	Pop.	±%
1920	5,202	—
1930	4,672	−10.2%
1940	4,853	+3.9%
1950	6,214	+28.0%
1960	5,934	−4.5%
1970	4,939	−16.8%
1980	5,335	+8.0%
1990	5,591	+4.8%
2000	5,813	+4.0%
2010	5,418	−6.8%
2020	5,412	−0.1%

== History ==
The area of present-day Hirono was part of Mutsu Province, and was included in the holdings of Iwakitaira Domain under the Tokugawa shogunate of Edo period Japan. After the Meiji restoration, on April 1, 1889, the village of Hirono was created within Naraha District, Fukushima with the establishment of the modern municipalities system. Naraha District became Futaba District in 1896. Hirono was elevated to town status on August 1, 1940.

=== 2011 earthquake and tsunami ===
The eastern, coastal portion of Hirono was inundated by devastating tsunami flood waters following the magnitude 9.0 2011 Tōhoku earthquake and tsunami off its coastline on March 11, 2011. Following the Fukushima Daiichi nuclear disaster, the town was included in the emergency evacuation preparation zone, as it was just outside the 20 kilometer exclusion zone; however, the town government recommended that all residents evacuate and all civic services were shut down. Although the central government advised that it was safe to return in September 2011, the town government maintained its evacuation recommendation until April 2012. The town hall reopened on March 1, 2012, in preparation for the return of residents and the radioactive decontamination of schools; however, a ban on agriculture remained in place. Residents were initially hesitant to return, with only 1,352 of the registered 5,005 residents having returned by February 2014. However, by the end of March 2020, the Hirono city government reported that over 88 percent of the former inhabitants had returned.

== Economy ==
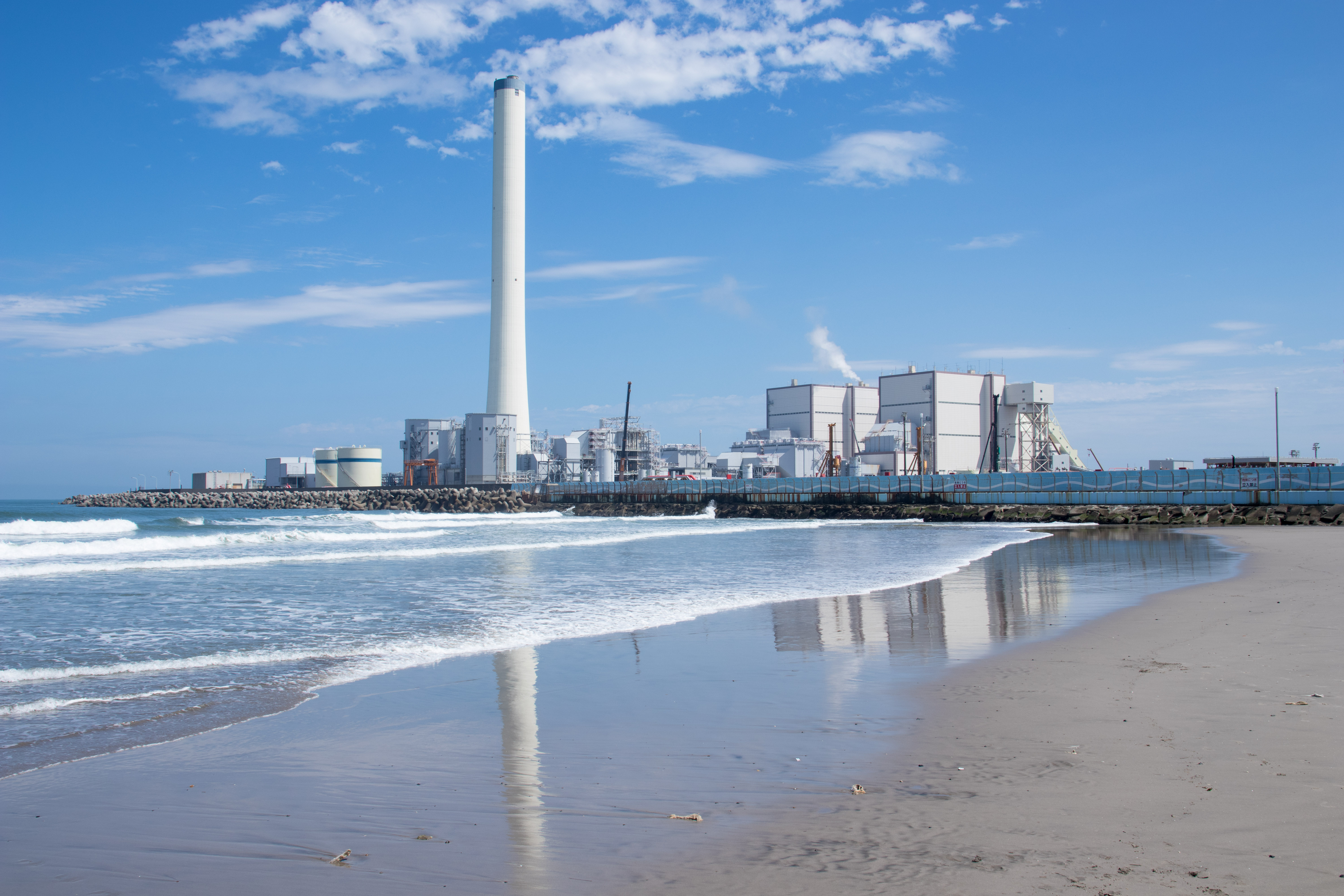
Hirono Thermal Power Station

The economy of Hirono is heavily dependent on agriculture. The fossil-fuel powered Hirono Thermal Power Station located directly at the Pacific Ocean about 3 km north of the town is also a major employer. Although damaged by the 2011 Tōhoku earthquake and tsunami Tepco managed to return the power station to operation four months later.

== Education ==
Hirono has one public elementary school and one public junior high school operated by the town government, and one public high school operated by the Fukushima Board of Education.

== Transportation ==
=== Railway ===
- JR East - Jōban Line
  - Hirono

=== Highway ===
- Jōban Expressway - Hirono Interchange
- National Route 6
