= 2025 Maurice Revello Tournament squads =

International association football tournament

The 2025 Maurice Revello Tournament was an international association football tournament held in Bouches-du-Rhône, France. The eight national teams involved in the tournament were required to register a squad of players; only players in these squads were eligible to take part in the tournament.

== Group A ==
=== France ===
Head coach: (France) Bernard Diomède

No.	Pos.	Player	Date of birth (age)	Club
1	GK	Alexis Mirbach	4 March 2005 (aged 20)	(French Football Federation) Metz
2	DF	Saël Kumbedi	26 March 2005 (aged 20)	(French Football Federation) Lyon
3	DF	Louis Leroux	23 January 2006 (aged 19)	(French Football Federation) Nantes
4	DF	Yoni Gomis	23 September 2005 (aged 19)	(French Football Federation) Strasbourg
5	MF	Aladji Bamba	14 July 2006 (aged 18)	(Monégasque Football Federation) Monaco
6	MF	Mayssam Benama	9 March 2005 (aged 20)	(Monégasque Football Federation) Monaco
7	FW	Lucas Michal	22 June 2005 (aged 19)	(Monégasque Football Federation) Monaco
8	MF	Saïmon Bouabré	1 June 2006 (aged 19)	(Monégasque Football Federation) Monaco
9	FW	Steve Ngoura	22 February 2005 (aged 20)	(Royal Belgian Football Association) Cercle Brugge
10	MF	Dehmaine Tabibou	17 April 2005 (aged 20)	(French Football Federation) Nantes
11	FW	Tidiam Gomis	6 August 2006 (aged 18)	(German Football Association) RB Leipzig
12	DF	Abdoul Koné	22 April 2005 (aged 20)	(French Football Federation) Reims
13	DF	Killian Prouchet	23 January 2005 (aged 20)	(French Football Federation) Reims
14	MF	Rabby Nzingoula	25 November 2005 (aged 19)	(French Football Federation) Montpellier
15	DF	Elyaz Zidane	26 December 2005 (aged 19)	(Royal Spanish Football Federation) Betis Deportivo
16	GK	Justin Bengui	9 July 2005 (aged 19)	(Football Association of Serbia) Jedinstvo Ub
17	FW	Ibrahim Mbaye	24 January 2008 (aged 17)	(French Football Federation) Paris Saint-Germain
18	FW	Mathys Detourbet	29 April 2007 (aged 18)	(French Football Federation) Troyes
19	FW	Simon Kalambayi	20 February 2005 (aged 20)	(German Football Association) Hoffenheim
20	FW	Noah Edjouma	4 October 2005 (aged 19)	(French Football Federation) Toulouse
22	DF	Kemryk Nagera	31 May 2005 (aged 20)	(French Football Federation) Lille
23	DF	Nhoa Sangui	27 February 2006 (aged 19)	(French Football Federation) Reims
24	DF	Steven Baseya	14 January 2005 (aged 20)	(French Football Federation) Villefranche
25	DF	Jaydee Canvot	29 July 2006 (aged 18)	(French Football Federation) Toulouse
26	DF	Emmanuel Biumla	8 May 2005 (aged 20)	(French Football Federation) Angers
27	DF	Mamadou Sarr	29 August 2005 (aged 19)	(French Football Federation) Strasbourg

=== Mali ===
Head coach: (Mali) Fousseni Diawara

No.	Pos.	Player	Date of birth (age)	Club
1	GK	Oumar Pona	21 June 2006 (aged 18)	(French Football Federation) Angers
2	DF	Séga Sanogo	15 July 2005 (aged 19)	(French Football Federation) Troyes
3	MF	Hamidou Makalou	15 July 2006 (aged 18)	(French Football Federation) Brest
4	DF	Fousseny Doumbia	23 February 2005 (aged 20)	(German Football Association) Eintracht Frankfurt
5	DF	Souleymane Sagnan	6 May 2005 (aged 20)	(French Football Federation) Lens
6	MF	Ousmane Thiero	8 April 2006 (aged 19)	(Austrian Football Association) Rapid Wien II
7	FW	Abdoulaye Niakaté	1 October 2004 (aged 20)	(French Football Federation) Caen
8	MF	Sékou Koné	3 February 2006 (aged 19)	(The Football Association) Manchester United
9	FW	Wilson Samaké	30 March 2004 (aged 21)	(French Football Federation) Rennes
10	MF	Ange Martial Tia	20 November 2006 (aged 18)	(French Football Federation) Reims
11	FW	Ibrahim Kanaté	23 October 2006 (aged 18)	(Royal Belgian Football Association) RSCA Futures
13	FW	Aboubakar Sidibé	7 February 2006 (aged 19)	(French Football Federation) Sochaux
15	DF	Eden Gassama	26 July 2005 (aged 19)	(French Football Federation) Guingamp
16	GK	Mayamé Sissoko	26 September 2004 (aged 20)	(French Football Federation) Quevilly-Rouen
17	MF	Ibrahim Diarra	12 December 2006 (aged 18)	(Royal Spanish Football Federation) Barcelona B
18	DF	Cheick Doumbia	18 October 2004 (aged 20)	(French Football Federation) Rodez
19	FW	Mahamoud Barry	11 June 2006 (aged 18)	(Royal Spanish Football Federation) Villarreal
20	FW	Gaoussou Diakité	26 September 2005 (aged 19)	(Austrian Football Association) Liefering
21	DF	Dan Sinaté	9 June 2006 (aged 18)	(French Football Federation) Angers
22	GK	Emile Doucouré	28 September 2007 (aged 17)	(Royal Belgian Football Association) Beerschot
23	DF	Isiaka Soukouna	27 February 2006 (aged 19)	(French Football Federation) Rennes

=== Panama ===
Head coach: (Panama) Jorge Dely Valdés

No.	Pos.	Player	Date of birth (age)	Club
1	GK	Cecilio Burgess	21 October 2005 (aged 19)	(Panamanian Football Federation) UMECIT
2	DF	Aymar Cundumí	7 May 2005 (aged 20)	(Panamanian Football Federation) San Miguelito
3	DF	Kevin Bernal	5 August 2005 (aged 19)	(Panamanian Football Federation) Tauro
4	DF	Aimar Sánchez	27 October 2005 (aged 19)	(Panamanian Football Federation) Plaza Amador
5	MF	Ariel Arroyo	23 January 2005 (aged 20)	(Panamanian Football Federation) Árabe Unido
6	MF	Blas Pérez Jr.	21 October 2005 (aged 19)	(Panamanian Football Federation) Tauro
7	FW	Didier Dawson	10 October 2005 (aged 19)	(Colombian Football Federation) Envigado
8	MF	Anel Ryce	6 July 2006 (aged 18)	(Ukrainian Association of Football) Chornomorets Odesa
9	FW	Gustavo Herrera	18 November 2005 (aged 19)	(Panamanian Football Federation) San Miguelito
10	MF	Giovany Herbert	12 March 2005 (aged 20)	(Brazilian Football Confederation) Athletico Paranaense
11	MF	Oldemar Castillo	5 January 2006 (aged 19)	(Panamanian Football Federation) San Miguelito
12	GK	Ian Flores	20 March 2005 (aged 20)	(Panamanian Football Federation) San Francisco
13	DF	Martín Krug	9 July 2006 (aged 18)	(Royal Spanish Football Federation) Atlético Levante
14	DF	Juan Carlos Hall	9 March 2006 (aged 19)	(Panamanian Football Federation) Herrera
15	DF	Joseph Jones	30 July 2005 (aged 19)	(Panamanian Football Federation) Plaza Amador
16	DF	Abdul Morales	18 June 2005 (aged 19)	(Panamanian Football Federation) Independiente
17	MF	Daivis Murillo	11 December 2005 (aged 19)	(Panamanian Football Federation) Potros del Este
18	MF	Carlos Hernández	7 May 2005 (aged 20)	(Uruguayan Football Association) Racing
19	MF	José Marengo	22 October 2005 (aged 19)	(Panamanian Football Federation) San Miguelito
20	DF	Antony Herbert	12 March 2005 (aged 20)	(Panamanian Football Federation) Árabe Unido
21	FW	Karlo Kuranyi	27 September 2005 (aged 19)	(German Football Association) FC 08 Villingen
22	FW	Raheen Cuello	28 February 2007 (aged 18)	(Costa Rican Football Federation) Alajuelense

=== Saudi Arabia ===
Head coach: (Italy) Luigi Di Biagio

No.	Pos.	Player	Date of birth (age)	Club
1	GK	Turki Baaljawsh	24 November 2003 (aged 21)	(Saudi Arabian Football Federation) Al-Ettifaq
2	DF	Ahmed Al-Julaydan	8 March 2004 (aged 21)	(Saudi Arabian Football Federation) Al Fateh
3	DF	Mohammed Al-Dossari	31 March 2003 (aged 22)	(Saudi Arabian Football Federation) Neom
5	DF	Khalid Asiri	27 November 2004 (aged 20)	(Saudi Arabian Football Federation) Al-Diriyah
6	MF	Abbas Al-Hassan	22 February 2004 (aged 21)	(Saudi Arabian Football Federation) Neom
7	FW	Abdulaziz Al-Aliwa	11 February 2004 (aged 21)	(Saudi Arabian Football Federation) Al-Nassr
8	MF	Rakan Al-Ghamdi	6 September 2005 (aged 19)	(Royal Dutch Football Association) NEC
9	FW	Abdullah Radif	20 January 2003 (aged 22)	(Saudi Arabian Football Federation) Al Taawoun
10	FW	Abdullah Al-Zaid	8 January 2004 (aged 21)	(Saudi Arabian Football Federation) Neom
11	FW	Majed Abdullah	13 February 2006 (aged 19)	(Saudi Arabian Football Federation) Al Shabab
13	DF	Mishal Al-Alaeli	17 June 2004 (aged 20)	(Saudi Arabian Football Federation) Al Wehda
14	MF	Bader Al-Omair	27 September 2004 (aged 20)	(Saudi Arabian Football Federation) Al Batin
15	DF	Abdulmalik Al-Oyayari	10 December 2003 (aged 21)	(Saudi Arabian Football Federation) Neom
16	MF	Abdulmalik Al-Jaber	7 January 2004 (aged 21)	(Football Association of Bosnia and Herzegovina) Željezničar Sarajevo
18	MF	Abdullah Subayt	8 May 2004 (aged 21)	(Saudi Arabian Football Federation) Al Faisaly
19	FW	Abdulaziz Al-Othman	2 January 2004 (aged 21)	(Saudi Arabian Football Federation) Al Qadsiah
20	FW	Faisal Al-Abdulwahed	29 December 2004 (aged 20)	(Saudi Arabian Football Federation) Al Batin
21	GK	Osama Al-Mermesh	6 July 2003 (aged 21)	(Saudi Arabian Football Federation) Al-Ittihad
22	GK	Muhannad Al-Yahya	19 September 2004 (aged 20)	(Saudi Arabian Football Federation) Al Fateh
23	DF	Mohammed Barnawi	7 August 2005 (aged 19)	(Saudi Arabian Football Federation) Al-Hilal
24	MF	Zaid Al-Anazi	30 July 2004 (aged 20)	(Saudi Arabian Football Federation) Al-Ahli
26	DF	Abdulrahman Al-Obaid	2 July 2004 (aged 20)	(Saudi Arabian Football Federation) Al-Najma
28	DF	Hussain Al-Zarie	5 February 2004 (aged 21)	(Saudi Arabian Football Federation) Al Fateh
29	DF	Mohammed Abdulrahman	14 January 2003 (aged 22)	(Saudi Arabian Football Federation) Al-Ettifaq

== Group B ==
=== Congo ===
Head coach: (France) Julien Mette

No.	Pos.	Player	Date of birth (age)	Club
1	GK	Yann Batola	26 January 2004 (aged 21)	(French Football Federation) Granville
2	MF	Lenny Dziki Loussilaho	5 May 2005 (aged 20)	(French Football Federation) Dunkerque
3	DF	Ken Koumous	4 February 2006 (aged 19)	(French Football Federation) Auxerre
4	DF	Jérémy Mounsesse	1 September 2005 (aged 19)	(French Football Federation) Lyon
5	DF	Brad Mantsounga	6 September 2007 (aged 17)	(French Football Federation) Nice
6	MF	Kimi Gandziri	27 February 2006 (aged 19)	(French Football Federation) Metz
7	FW	Alan Bikoumou	12 January 2005 (aged 20)	(French Football Federation) Sochaux
8	MF	Keviriel Massoumou	6 July 2006 (aged 18)	(French Football Federation) Ajaccio
9	FW	Destin Banzouzi	3 February 2004 (aged 21)	(French Football Federation) Orléans
10	FW	Abdallah Mbemba	17 November 2006 (aged 18)	(French Football Federation) Le Havre
11	FW	Noah Le Bret	16 January 2005 (aged 20)	(French Football Federation) Rennes
12	FW	Breyton Fougeu	6 January 2004 (aged 21)	(Turkish Football Federation) Adana Demirspor
13	DF	Aaron Maniongui	20 March 2006 (aged 19)	(Royal Belgian Football Association) Seraing
14	MF	César Obongo	10 July 2006 (aged 18)	(French Football Federation) Dijon
16	GK	Desthy Nkounkou	11 March 2005 (aged 20)	(French Football Federation) Chambly
17	FW	Jason Bemba	31 March 2006 (aged 19)	(French Football Federation) Sochaux
18	MF	Lorick Nana	29 June 2005 (aged 19)	(Italian Football Federation) Ilvamaddalena 1903
19	DF	Steed Tchicamboud	4 January 2007 (aged 18)	(French Football Federation) Le Havre
20	DF	Philippe Ndinga	3 June 2005 (aged 20)	(French Football Federation) Valenciennes
21	DF	Steevy Mazikou	20 March 2006 (aged 19)	(French Football Federation) Bastia
22	FW	Jean Nyindong Tsamouna	6 July 2006 (aged 18)	(French Football Federation) Clermont

=== Denmark ===
Head coach: (Denmark) Mark Strudal

No.	Pos.	Player	Date of birth (age)	Club
1	GK	Andreas Dithmer	1 July 2005 (aged 19)	(Royal Dutch Football Association) Utrecht
2	DF	Gustav Mortensen	19 March 2004 (aged 21)	(Danish Football Association) Vendsyssel
3	DF	Kaare Barslund	23 March 2004 (aged 21)	(Swedish Football Association) Brommapojkarna
4	DF	Jonathan Foss	25 June 2004 (aged 20)	(German Football Association) Borussia Mönchengladbach
5	DF	Villads Nielsen	29 January 2005 (aged 20)	(Norwegian Football Federation) Bodø/Glimt
6	MF	Mads Enggård	20 January 2004 (aged 21)	(Norwegian Football Federation) Molde
7	FW	Gustav Christensen	7 September 2004 (aged 20)	(German Football Association) FC Ingolstadt 04
8	MF	Jakob Vester	1 December 2004 (aged 20)	(Danish Football Association) Viborg FF
9	FW	Alexander Simmelhack	11 November 2005 (aged 19)	(Danish Football Association) Silkeborg IF
10	MF	Oskar Øhlenschlæger	19 April 2004 (aged 21)	(Norwegian Football Federation) Fredrikstad
11	FW	Alexander Lyng	26 November 2004 (aged 20)	(Danish Football Association) Sønderjyske
12	FW	Chido Obi	29 November 2007 (aged 17)	(The Football Association) Manchester United
13	FW	Sami Jalal	8 August 2004 (aged 20)	(Danish Football Association) Kolding
14	MF	Lauge Sandgrav	16 September 2004 (aged 20)	(Danish Football Association) Lyngby
15	DF	Pontus Texel	27 February 2004 (aged 21)	(Portuguese Football Federation) Mafra
16	GK	Silas Bjerre	18 February 2005 (aged 20)	(Portuguese Football Federation) Torreense
17	DF	Benjamin Clemmensen	4 January 2005 (aged 20)	(Danish Football Association) Vendsyssel
18	DF	William Clem	20 June 2004 (aged 20)	(Danish Football Association) Copenhagen
19	FW	Michael Opoku	10 July 2005 (aged 19)	(Danish Football Association) Lyngby
20	MF	Julius Beck	27 April 2005 (aged 20)	(Danish Football Association) Esbjerg fB
21	FW	Emil Rohd	4 November 2004 (aged 20)	(Norwegian Football Federation) Haugesund
22	GK	Kasper Kiilerich	22 November 2005 (aged 19)	(Danish Football Association) Aarhus Fremad
23	DF	Sabil Hansen	4 November 2005 (aged 19)	(Danish Football Association) Randers

=== Japan ===
Head coach: Yuzo Funakoshi

No.	Pos.	Player	Date of birth (age)	Club
1	GK	Keisuke Nakamura	27 April 2005 (aged 20)	(Japan Football Association) Tokyo Verdy
2	DF	Rei Umeki	25 August 2005 (aged 19)	(Japan Football Association) FC Imabari
3	DF	Niko Takahashi	17 August 2005 (aged 19)	(Japan Football Association) Cerezo Osaka
4	DF	Yugo Okawa	14 July 2007 (aged 17)	(Japan Football Association) Kashima Antlers
5	DF	Rion Ichihara	7 July 2005 (aged 19)	(Japan Football Association) Omiya Ardija
6	MF	Kosei Ogura	9 March 2005 (aged 20)	(Japan Football Association) Hosei University
7	FW	Hagumu Nakagawa	7 June 2005 (aged 19)	(Japan Football Association) Ryutsu Keizai University
8	MF	Yudai Shimamoto	26 October 2006 (aged 18)	(Japan Football Association) Shimizu S-Pulse
9	FW	Soma Kanda	29 December 2005 (aged 19)	(Japan Football Association) Kawasaki Frontale
10	MF	Yuto Ozeki	6 February 2005 (aged 20)	(Japan Football Association) Fukushima United
11	FW	Sora Hiraga	2 March 2005 (aged 20)	(Japan Football Association) Kyoto Sanga
12	GK	Alexandre Pisano	10 January 2006 (aged 19)	(Japan Football Association) Nagoya Grampus
13	FW	Hisatsugu Ishii	7 July 2005 (aged 19)	(Japan Football Association) Shonan Bellmare
14	FW	Yutaka Michiwaki	5 April 2006 (aged 19)	(Royal Belgian Football Association) Beveren
15	DF	Harumichi Shiokawa	25 April 2005 (aged 20)	(Japan Football Association) Ryutsu Keizai University
16	DF	Mihiro Sato	26 February 2007 (aged 18)	(Japan Football Association) Kashima Antlers
17	FW	Aren Inoue	19 September 2006 (aged 18)	(Japan Football Association) Sanfrecce Hiroshima
18	MF	Katsuma Fuse	11 March 2007 (aged 18)	(Japan Football Association) University of Tsukuba
19	DF	Kaito Tsuchiya	12 May 2006 (aged 19)	(Japan Football Association) Kawasaki Frontale
20	FW	Rento Takaoka	12 March 2007 (aged 18)	(The Football Association) Southampton
21	MF	Yumeki Yokoyama	23 September 2005 (aged 19)	(Japan Football Association) FC Imabari
22	MF	Nelson Ishiwatari	10 May 2005 (aged 20)	(Japan Football Association) Iwaki FC
23	GK	Rui Araki	14 October 2007 (aged 17)	(Japan Football Association) Gamba Osaka
24	DF	Soichiro Mori	29 June 2007 (aged 17)	(Japan Football Association) Nagoya Grampus
25	MF	Motoki Nishihara	16 December 2006 (aged 18)	(Japan Football Association) Shimizu S-Pulse
26	GK	Masataka Kobayashi	20 September 2005 (aged 19)	(Japan Football Association) FC Tokyo

=== Mexico ===
Head coach: (Mexico) Eduardo Arce

No.	Pos.	Player	Date of birth (age)	Club
1	GK	Emmanuel Ochoa	5 May 2005 (aged 20)	(Mexican Football Federation) Cruz Azul
2	DF	Diego Ochoa	20 April 2005 (aged 20)	(Mexican Football Federation) Guadalajara
3	MF	Jaziel Mendoza	20 May 2005 (aged 20)	(Mexican Football Federation) Cruz Azul
4	DF	Ángel Chávez	19 February 2005 (aged 20)	(Mexican Football Federation) Necaxa
5	MF	Bernardo Parra	6 January 2005 (aged 20)	(Mexican Football Federation) UANL
6	DF	César Bustos	27 August 2005 (aged 19)	(Mexican Football Federation) Monterrey
7	FW	Heriberto Jurado	3 January 2005 (aged 20)	(Royal Belgian Football Association) Cercle Brugge
8	FW	Hugo Camberos	21 January 2007 (aged 18)	(Mexican Football Federation) Guadalajara
9	FW	Stephano Carrillo	7 March 2006 (aged 19)	(Royal Dutch Football Association) Feyenoord
10	FW	Tahiel Jiménez	22 January 2006 (aged 19)	(Mexican Football Federation) Santos Laguna
11	MF	Yael Padilla	19 December 2005 (aged 19)	(Mexican Football Federation) Guadalajara
12	GK	Pablo Lara	29 June 2005 (aged 19)	(Mexican Football Federation) UNAM
13	FW	Oswaldo Virgen	7 April 2005 (aged 20)	(Mexican Football Federation) Toluca
14	MF	Diego Sánchez	12 April 2005 (aged 20)	(Mexican Football Federation) UANL
15	DF	Rodrigo Pachuca	24 July 2005 (aged 19)	(Mexican Football Federation) Puebla
16	MF	César Garza	1 July 2005 (aged 19)	(Scottish Football Association) Dundee
17	MF	Ángel Rico	12 January 2005 (aged 20)	(Mexican Football Federation) UNAM
18	DF	Luis Navarrete	23 March 2006 (aged 19)	(Mexican Football Federation) Toluca
19	MF	Omar Moreno	30 January 2005 (aged 20)	(Mexican Football Federation) Mazatlán
20	MF	Amaury Morales	3 December 2005 (aged 19)	(Mexican Football Federation) Cruz Azul
21	DF	Everardo López	23 March 2005 (aged 20)	(Mexican Football Federation) Toluca
22	MF	Juan Pablo Uribe	27 June 2006 (aged 18)	(Mexican Football Federation) Guadalajara
