= 2024–25 in Danish football =

Football in Denmark
- Season: 2024–25

Men's football
- Danish Superliga: Copenhagen
- Danish 1st Division: OB
- Danish 2nd Division: Aarhus Fremad
- Danish 3rd Division: Brabrand
- Danish Cup: Copenhagen

Women's football
- Danish Women's League: Fortuna Hjørring
- Danish Women's Cup: Fortuna Hjørring

The 2024–25 season was the 132nd competitive association football season in Denmark.

== League competitions (men's) ==
=== Danish Superliga ===
| Pos | Team | Pld | W | D | L | GF | GA | GD | Pts | Qualification |
|---|---|---|---|---|---|---|---|---|---|---|
| 1 | Midtjylland | 22 | 14 | 3 | 5 | 42 | 27 | +15 | 45 | Qualification for the Championship round |
| 2 | Copenhagen | 22 | 11 | 8 | 3 | 38 | 24 | +14 | 41 | Qualification for the Championship round |
| 3 | AGF | 22 | 9 | 9 | 4 | 42 | 23 | +19 | 36 | Qualification for the Championship round |
| 4 | Randers | 22 | 9 | 8 | 5 | 39 | 28 | +11 | 35 | Qualification for the Championship round |
| 5 | Nordsjælland | 22 | 10 | 5 | 7 | 39 | 36 | +3 | 35 | Qualification for the Championship round |
| 6 | Brøndby | 22 | 8 | 9 | 5 | 42 | 32 | +10 | 33 | Qualification for the Championship round |
| 7 | Silkeborg | 22 | 8 | 9 | 5 | 38 | 29 | +9 | 33 | Qualification for the Relegation round |
| 8 | Viborg | 22 | 7 | 7 | 8 | 38 | 39 | −1 | 28 | Qualification for the Relegation round |
| 9 | AaB | 22 | 5 | 6 | 11 | 23 | 41 | −18 | 21 | Qualification for the Relegation round |
| 10 | Lyngby | 22 | 3 | 9 | 10 | 15 | 26 | −11 | 18 | Qualification for the Relegation round |
| 11 | Sønderjyske | 22 | 4 | 5 | 13 | 26 | 51 | −25 | 17 | Qualification for the Relegation round |
| 12 | Vejle | 22 | 3 | 4 | 15 | 24 | 50 | −26 | 13 | Qualification for the Relegation round |

Source: Danish Football Association (in Danish), Soccerway
Rules for classification: 1) Points; 2) Goal difference; 3) Goals scored; 4) Away goals scored; 5) Play-off (played on neutral ground if determining teams for different rounds); 6) Draw.

==== Championship round ====
| Pos | Team | Pld | W | D | L | GF | GA | GD | Pts | |
|---|---|---|---|---|---|---|---|---|---|---|
| 1 | Copenhagen (C) | 32 | 18 | 9 | 5 | 60 | 33 | +27 | 63 | Qualification for the UEFA Champions League second qualifying round |
| 2 | Midtjylland | 32 | 19 | 5 | 8 | 64 | 42 | +22 | 62 | Qualification for the UEFA Europa League second qualifying round |
| 3 | Brøndby | 32 | 13 | 12 | 7 | 58 | 46 | +12 | 51 | Qualification for the UEFA Conference League second qualifying round |
| 4 | Randers | 32 | 13 | 9 | 10 | 57 | 50 | +7 | 48 | Qualification for the European play-off match |
| 5 | Nordsjælland | 32 | 13 | 7 | 12 | 53 | 56 | −3 | 46 | |
| 6 | AGF | 32 | 10 | 10 | 12 | 53 | 46 | +7 | 40 | |

Source: Danish Football Association (in Danish), Soccerway
Rules for classification: 1) Points; 2) Goal difference; 3) Goals scored; 4) Away goals scored; 5) Play-off (played on neutral ground if determining teams for different rounds); 6) Draw.
(C) Champions

==== Relegation round ====
| Pos | Team | Pld | W | D | L | GF | GA | GD | Pts | |
|---|---|---|---|---|---|---|---|---|---|---|
| 1 | Silkeborg (O) | 32 | 13 | 10 | 9 | 56 | 41 | +15 | 49 | Qualification for the European play-off match |
| 2 | Viborg | 32 | 12 | 11 | 9 | 57 | 50 | +7 | 47 | |
| 3 | Sønderjyske | 32 | 10 | 7 | 15 | 47 | 64 | −17 | 37 | |
| 4 | Vejle | 32 | 7 | 7 | 18 | 37 | 64 | −27 | 28 | |
| 5 | Lyngby (R) | 32 | 5 | 12 | 15 | 26 | 43 | −17 | 27 | Relegation to 1st Division |
| 6 | AaB (R) | 32 | 5 | 9 | 18 | 34 | 67 | −33 | 24 | Relegation to 1st Division |

Source: Danish Football Association (in Danish), Soccerway
Rules for classification: 1) Points; 2) Goal difference; 3) Goals scored; 4) Away goals scored; 5) Play-off (played on neutral ground if determining teams for different rounds); 6) Draw.
(O) Play-off winners; (R) Relegated

=== Danish 1st Division ===
| Pos | Team | Pld | W | D | L | GF | GA | GD | Pts | Promotion or Relegation |
|---|---|---|---|---|---|---|---|---|---|---|
| 1 | OB | 22 | 14 | 7 | 1 | 48 | 22 | +26 | 49 | Advances to Promotion Group |
| 2 | FC Fredericia | 22 | 13 | 1 | 8 | 44 | 26 | +18 | 40 | Advances to Promotion Group |
| 3 | AC Horsens | 22 | 12 | 4 | 6 | 38 | 29 | +9 | 40 | Advances to Promotion Group |
| 4 | Hvidovre | 22 | 10 | 6 | 6 | 25 | 19 | +6 | 36 | Advances to Promotion Group |
| 5 | Kolding | 22 | 9 | 7 | 6 | 21 | 13 | +8 | 34 | Advances to Promotion Group |
| 6 | Esbjerg fB | 22 | 11 | 1 | 10 | 40 | 35 | +5 | 34 | Advances to Promotion Group |
| 7 | Hillerød | 22 | 8 | 8 | 6 | 34 | 28 | +6 | 32 | Advances to Relegation Group |
| 8 | Hobro | 22 | 7 | 5 | 10 | 30 | 38 | −8 | 26 | Advances to Relegation Group |
| 9 | B.93 | 22 | 6 | 5 | 11 | 25 | 43 | −18 | 23 | Advances to Relegation Group |
| 10 | HB Køge | 22 | 6 | 4 | 12 | 25 | 41 | −16 | 22 | Advances to Relegation Group |
| 11 | Vendsyssel | 22 | 5 | 5 | 12 | 25 | 37 | −12 | 20 | Advances to Relegation Group |
| 12 | FC Roskilde | 22 | 4 | 1 | 17 | 19 | 43 | −24 | 13 | Advances to Relegation Group |

Source: Danish FA
Rules for classification: 1) points; 2) goal difference; 3) number of goals scored

==== Promotion round ====
| Pos | Team | Pld | W | D | L | GF | GA | GD | Pts | Qualification or relegation | ODE | FRE | ACH | KOL | HVI | EFB |
|---|---|---|---|---|---|---|---|---|---|---|---|---|---|---|---|---|
| 1 | OB (C, P) | 32 | 18 | 11 | 3 | 69 | 35 | +34 | 65 | Promotion to Danish Superliga | — | 1–1 | 1–0 | 4–3 | 1–1 | 4–2 |
| 2 | FC Fredericia (P) | 32 | 20 | 4 | 8 | 65 | 30 | +35 | 64 | Promotion to Danish Superliga | 1–0 | — | 5–1 | 2–0 | 5–1 | 1–1 |
| 3 | AC Horsens | 32 | 15 | 6 | 11 | 49 | 48 | +1 | 51 | | 2–2 | 0–3 | — | 2–3 | 1–0 | 3–2 |
| 4 | Kolding | 32 | 14 | 8 | 10 | 36 | 28 | +8 | 50 | | 1–1 | 0–1 | 2–0 | — | 1–3 | 2–1 |
| 5 | Hvidovre | 32 | 12 | 9 | 11 | 33 | 35 | −2 | 45 | | 2–1 | 0–0 | 1–1 | 0–1 | — | 0–3 |
| 6 | Esbjerg fB | 32 | 13 | 2 | 17 | 52 | 56 | −4 | 41 | | 0–6 | 0–2 | 0–1 | 1–2 | 2–0 | — |

Legend: Blue = home team win; Yellow = draw; Red = away team win.
Rules for classification: 1) Points; 2) Goal difference; 3) Goals scored; 4) Away goals scored; 5) Play-off (played on neutral ground if determining teams for different rounds); 6) Draw.
(C) Champions; (P) Promoted

==== Relegation round ====
| Pos | Team | Pld | W | D | L | GF | GA | GD | Pts | Qualification or relegation | HIL | HOB | B93 | HBK | VEN | ROS |
|---|---|---|---|---|---|---|---|---|---|---|---|---|---|---|---|---|
| 1 | Hillerød | 32 | 14 | 10 | 8 | 56 | 38 | +18 | 52 | | — | 2–0 | 5–2 | 3–0 | 3–1 | 5–2 |
| 2 | Hobro | 32 | 10 | 9 | 13 | 39 | 51 | −12 | 39 | | 0–0 | — | 0–0 | 2–1 | 3–1 | 1–1 |
| 3 | B.93 | 32 | 9 | 8 | 15 | 42 | 61 | −19 | 35 | | 1–0 | 5–0 | — | 2–2 | 2–2 | 0–2 |
| 4 | HB Køge | 32 | 9 | 7 | 16 | 36 | 57 | −21 | 34 | | 0–2 | 0–2 | 2–1 | — | 0–0 | 4–3 |
| 5 | Vendsyssel (R) | 32 | 7 | 9 | 16 | 35 | 49 | −14 | 30 | Relegation to 2nd Division | 0–0 | 2–0 | 3–1 | 0–0 | — | 0–0 |
| 6 | FC Roskilde (R) | 32 | 7 | 5 | 20 | 37 | 61 | −24 | 26 | Relegation to 2nd Division | 4–2 | 1–1 | 2–3 | 1–1 | 2–1 | — |

Legend: Blue = home team win; Yellow = draw; Red = away team win.
Rules for classification: 1) Points; 2) Goal difference; 3) Goals scored; 4) Away goals scored; 5) Play-off (played on neutral ground if determining teams for different rounds); 6) Draw.
(R) Relegated

=== Danish 2nd Division ===
| Pos | Team | Pld | W | D | L | GF | GA | GD | Pts | Promotion or Relegation |
|---|---|---|---|---|---|---|---|---|---|---|
| 1 | Aarhus Fremad | 22 | 14 | 2 | 6 | 38 | 17 | +21 | 44 | Qualification to Promotion Group |
| 2 | Fremad Amager | 22 | 13 | 3 | 6 | 33 | 23 | +10 | 42 | Qualification to Promotion Group |
| 3 | Middelfart BK | 22 | 12 | 4 | 6 | 35 | 23 | +12 | 40 | Qualification to Promotion Group |
| 4 | Skive IK | 22 | 9 | 5 | 8 | 26 | 25 | +1 | 32 | Qualification to Promotion Group |
| 5 | Næstved BK | 22 | 9 | 5 | 8 | 23 | 26 | −3 | 32 | Qualification to Promotion Group |
| 6 | Akademisk Boldklub | 22 | 8 | 7 | 7 | 33 | 28 | +5 | 31 | Qualification to Promotion Group |
| 7 | BK Frem | 22 | 8 | 6 | 8 | 25 | 23 | +2 | 30 | Qualification to Relegation Group |
| 8 | HIK | 22 | 8 | 4 | 10 | 22 | 27 | −5 | 28 | Qualification to Relegation Group |
| 9 | Ishøj IF | 22 | 7 | 6 | 9 | 24 | 29 | −5 | 27 | Qualification to Relegation Group |
| 10 | FC Helsingør | 22 | 6 | 8 | 8 | 27 | 29 | −2 | 26 | Qualification to Relegation Group |
| 11 | Thisted FC | 22 | 5 | 7 | 10 | 19 | 29 | −10 | 22 | Qualification to Relegation Group |
| 12 | Nykøbing FC | 22 | 3 | 3 | 16 | 15 | 41 | −26 | 12 | Qualification to Relegation Group |

Rules for classification: 1) points; 2) goal difference; 3) number of goals scored

==== Promotion round ====
| Pos | Team | Pld | W | D | L | GF | GA | GD | Pts | Qualification or relegation | AAF | MID | FAM | ABG | SKI | NBK |
|---|---|---|---|---|---|---|---|---|---|---|---|---|---|---|---|---|
| 1 | Aarhus Fremad (C, P) | 32 | 18 | 6 | 8 | 55 | 23 | +32 | 60 | Promotion to 1st Division | — | 0–0 | 1–1 | 1–2 | 1–2 | 7–0 |
| 2 | Middelfart BK (P) | 32 | 17 | 8 | 7 | 46 | 30 | +16 | 59 | Promotion to 1st Division | 0–0 | — | 3–1 | 1–0 | 1–0 | 3–0 |
| 3 | Fremad Amager | 32 | 16 | 7 | 9 | 42 | 37 | +5 | 55 | | 0–1 | 1–1 | — | 1–1 | 1–1 | 1–0 |
| 4 | Akademisk Boldklub | 32 | 14 | 9 | 9 | 55 | 36 | +19 | 51 | | 0–2 | 4–0 | 5–0 | — | 5–1 | 1–1 |
| 5 | Skive IK | 32 | 11 | 8 | 13 | 36 | 42 | −6 | 41 | | 1–1 | 1–1 | 0–1 | 1–3 | — | 0–2 |
| 6 | Næstved BK | 32 | 10 | 6 | 16 | 28 | 48 | −20 | 36 | | 0–3 | 0–1 | 1–2 | 0–1 | 1–3 | — |

Legend: Blue = home team win; Yellow = draw; Red = away team win.
Rules for classification: 1) Points; 2) Goal difference; 3) Goals scored; 4) Away goals scored; 5) Play-off (played on neutral ground if determining teams for different rounds); 6) Draw.
(C) Champions; (P) Promoted

==== Relegation round ====
| Pos | Team | Pld | W | D | L | GF | GA | GD | Pts | Qualification or relegation | ISH | THI | HIK | HEL | FRE | NYK |
|---|---|---|---|---|---|---|---|---|---|---|---|---|---|---|---|---|
| 1 | Ishøj IF | 32 | 11 | 10 | 11 | 44 | 45 | −1 | 43 | | — | 3–4 | 1–1 | 3–2 | 3–0 | 2–1 |
| 2 | Thisted FC | 32 | 10 | 11 | 11 | 39 | 43 | −4 | 41 | | 3–3 | — | 1–1 | 1–2 | 1–1 | 1–1 |
| 3 | HIK | 32 | 11 | 7 | 14 | 32 | 44 | −12 | 40 | | 1–0 | 0–2 | — | 0–6 | 4–1 | 1–1 |
| 4 | FC Helsingør | 32 | 9 | 12 | 11 | 49 | 46 | +3 | 39 | | 2–2 | 2–3 | 1–2 | — | 1–0 | 2–2 |
| 5 | BK Frem (R) | 32 | 9 | 10 | 13 | 33 | 38 | −5 | 37 | Relegation to 3rd Division | 1–1 | 0–2 | 3–0 | 1–1 | — | 0–1 |
| 6 | Nykøbing FC (R) | 32 | 5 | 8 | 19 | 28 | 55 | −27 | 23 | Relegation to 3rd Division | 1–2 | 1–2 | 1–0 | 3–3 | 1–1 | — |

Legend: Blue = home team win; Yellow = draw; Red = away team win.
Rules for classification: 1) Points; 2) Goal difference; 3) Goals scored; 4) Away goals scored; 5) Play-off (played on neutral ground if determining teams for different rounds); 6) Draw.
(R) Relegated

=== Danish 3rd Division ===
| Pos | Team | Pld | W | D | L | GF | GA | GD | Pts | Promotion or Relegation |
|---|---|---|---|---|---|---|---|---|---|---|
| 1 | Brabrand | 22 | 12 | 5 | 5 | 35 | 23 | +12 | 41 | Qualification to Promotion Group |
| 2 | VSK Aarhus | 22 | 12 | 4 | 6 | 38 | 28 | +10 | 40 | Qualification to Promotion Group |
| 3 | Brønshøj BK | 22 | 10 | 7 | 5 | 27 | 17 | +10 | 37 | Qualification to Promotion Group |
| 4 | Odder | 22 | 9 | 9 | 4 | 38 | 34 | +4 | 36 | Qualification to Promotion Group |
| 5 | Holbæk B&I | 22 | 10 | 4 | 8 | 29 | 22 | +7 | 34 | Qualification to Promotion Group |
| 6 | Næsby | 22 | 9 | 5 | 8 | 37 | 27 | +10 | 32 | Qualification to Promotion Group |
| 7 | FA 2000 | 22 | 7 | 7 | 8 | 26 | 24 | +2 | 28 | Qualification to Relegation Group |
| 8 | Avarta | 22 | 8 | 2 | 12 | 18 | 32 | −14 | 26 | Qualification to Relegation Group |
| 9 | Sundby BK | 22 | 6 | 7 | 9 | 21 | 30 | −9 | 25 | Qualification to Relegation Group |
| 10 | Young Boys | 22 | 5 | 7 | 10 | 23 | 32 | −9 | 22 | Qualification to Relegation Group |
| 11 | IF Lyseng | 22 | 5 | 7 | 10 | 23 | 33 | −10 | 22 | Qualification to Relegation Group |
| 12 | Holstebro | 22 | 5 | 4 | 13 | 26 | 39 | −13 | 19 | Qualification to Relegation Group |

Rules for classification: 1) points; 2) goal difference; 3) number of goals scored

==== Promotion round ====
| Pos | Team | Pld | W | D | L | GF | GA | GD | Pts | Qualification or relegation | BRA | VSK | HBI | NBK | BBK | ODD |
|---|---|---|---|---|---|---|---|---|---|---|---|---|---|---|---|---|
| 1 | Brabrand (C, P) | 32 | 17 | 8 | 7 | 49 | 36 | +13 | 59 | Promotion to Danish 2nd Division | | 1–1 | 1–0 | 3–2 | 0–0 | 1–1 |
| 2 | VSK Aarhus (P) | 32 | 15 | 9 | 8 | 54 | 41 | +13 | 54 | Promotion to Danish 2nd Division | 0–1 | | 2–5 | 4–0 | 2–0 | 1–1 |
| 3 | Holbæk B&I | 32 | 15 | 8 | 9 | 54 | 36 | +18 | 53 | | 4–0 | 2–2 | | 2–2 | 2–0 | 2–0 |
| 4 | Næsby | 33 | 11 | 8 | 14 | 61 | 50 | +11 | 41 | | 1–2 | 2–3 | 3–3 | | 2–1 | 6–1 |
| 5 | Brønshøj BK | 32 | 10 | 11 | 11 | 33 | 34 | −1 | 41 | | 0–2 | 0–0 | 2–2 | 2–4 | | 0–2 |
| 6 | Odder | 32 | 11 | 14 | 7 | 53 | 54 | −1 | 47 | | 4–3 | 1–1 | 2–3 | 2–2 | 1–1 | |

Legend: Blue = home team win; Yellow = draw; Red = away team win.
Rules for classification: 1) Points; 2) Goal difference; 3) Goals scored; 4) Away goals scored; 5) Play-off (played on neutral ground if determining teams for different rounds); 6) Draw.
(C) Champions; (P) Promoted

==== Relegation round ====
| Pos | Team | Pld | W | D | L | GF | GA | GD | Pts | Qualification or relegation | FA2 | IFL | SBK | HBK | AVA | YBF |
|---|---|---|---|---|---|---|---|---|---|---|---|---|---|---|---|---|
| 1 | FA 2000 | 32 | 12 | 10 | 10 | 42 | 32 | +10 | 46 | | — | 3–1 | 1–1 | 0–2 | 1–1 | 0–0 |
| 2 | IF Lyseng | 32 | 10 | 10 | 12 | 44 | 48 | −4 | 40 | | 2–0 | — | 2–2 | 4–1 | 2–1 | 3–1 |
| 3 | Sundby BK | 32 | 10 | 10 | 12 | 35 | 47 | −12 | 40 | | 0–1 | 2–1 | — | 0–3 | 1–0 | 3–2 |
| 4 | Holstebro (R) | 32 | 11 | 5 | 16 | 52 | 60 | −8 | 38 | Relegation to Denmark Series | 0–6 | 3–3 | 4–1 | — | 6–3 | 1–0 |
| 5 | Avarta (R) | 32 | 10 | 5 | 17 | 30 | 51 | −21 | 35 | Relegation to Denmark Series | 0–1 | 1–1 | 1–1 | 2–5 | — | 2–1 |
| 6 | Young Boys (R) | 32 | 6 | 8 | 18 | 33 | 51 | −18 | 26 | Relegation to Denmark Series | 1–3 | 1–2 | 2–3 | 2–1 | 0–1 | — |

Legend: Blue = home team win; Yellow = draw; Red = away team win.
Rules for classification: 1) Points; 2) Goal difference; 3) Goals scored; 4) Away goals scored; 5) Play-off (played on neutral ground if determining teams for different rounds); 6) Draw.
(R) Relegated

== Cup competitions ==
=== Danish Cup ===
==== Final ====
29 May 2025
17:00
Final

| Copenhagen (1) | 3–0 | Silkeborg (1) |
|---|---|---|
| Larsson 3' (Elyounoussi); Lerager 34' (Larsson); Elyounoussi 38'; Claesson (yellow card) 45+6'; Achouri (yellow card) 57'; Falk (yellow card) 77' | Report |

MCH Arena, Herning
Attendance: 11,048
Referee: Jacob Karlsen

== UEFA competitions ==
=== UEFA Champions League ===
==== Qualifying rounds ====
===== Midtjylland =====
Second qualifying round
| Team 1 | Agg. | Team 2 | 1st leg | 2nd leg |
|---|---|---|---|---|
| UE Santa Coloma (Andorra) | 0–4 | (Denmark) Midtjylland | 0–3 | 0–1 |

Third qualifying round
| Team 1 | Agg. | Team 2 | 1st leg | 2nd leg |
|---|---|---|---|---|
| Midtjylland (Denmark) | 3–1 | (Hungary) Ferencváros | 2–0 | 1–1 |

Play-off round
| Team 1 | Agg. | Team 2 | 1st leg | 2nd leg |
|---|---|---|---|---|
| Midtjylland (Denmark) | 3–4 | (Slovakia) Slovan Bratislava | 1–1 | 2–3 |

=== UEFA Europa League ===
==== League phase ====
| Pos | Team | Pld | W | D | L | GF | GA | GD | Pts | Qualification |
|---|---|---|---|---|---|---|---|---|---|---|
| 18 | (Portuguese Football Federation) Porto | 8 | 3 | 2 | 3 | 13 | 11 | +2 | 11 | Advance to knockout phase play-offs (unseeded) |
| 19 | (Royal Dutch Football Association) AZ | 8 | 3 | 2 | 3 | 13 | 13 | 0 | 11 | Advance to knockout phase play-offs (unseeded) |
| 20 | (Danish Football Association) Midtjylland | 8 | 3 | 2 | 3 | 9 | 9 | 0 | 11 | Advance to knockout phase play-offs (unseeded) |
| 21 | (Royal Belgian Football Association) Union Saint-Gilloise | 8 | 3 | 2 | 3 | 8 | 8 | 0 | 11 | Advance to knockout phase play-offs (unseeded) |
| 22 | (Hellenic Football Federation) PAOK | 8 | 3 | 1 | 4 | 12 | 10 | +2 | 10 | Advance to knockout phase play-offs (unseeded) |

Source: UEFA
Rules for classification: League phase tiebreakers

Knockout phase play-offs
| Team 1 | Agg. | Team 2 | 1st leg | 2nd leg |
|---|---|---|---|---|
| Midtjylland (Denmark) | 3–7 | (Spain) Real Sociedad | 1–2 | 2–5 |

===== Silkeborg =====
Second qualifying round
| Team 1 | Agg. | Team 2 | 1st leg | 2nd leg |
|---|---|---|---|---|
| Molde (Norway) | 5–4 | (Denmark) Silkeborg | 3–1 | 2–3 |

=== UEFA Conference League ===
==== Qualifying rounds ====
===== Silkeborg =====
Third qualifying round
| Team 1 | Agg. | Team 2 | 1st leg | 2nd leg |
|---|---|---|---|---|
| Silkeborg (Denmark) | 4–5 | (Belgium) Gent | 2–2 | 2–3 (a.e.t.) |

===== Brøndby =====
Second qualifying round
| Team 1 | Agg. | Team 2 | 1st leg | 2nd leg |
|---|---|---|---|---|
| Brøndby (Denmark) | 8–2 | (Kosovo) Llapi | 6–0 | 2–2 |

Third qualifying round
| Team 1 | Agg. | Team 2 | 1st leg | 2nd leg |
|---|---|---|---|---|
| Brøndby (Denmark) | 8–2 | (Poland) Legia Warsaw | 2–3 | 1–1 |

===== FC København =====
Second qualifying round
| Team 1 | Agg. | Team 2 | 1st leg | 2nd leg |
|---|---|---|---|---|
| Magpies (Gibraltar) | 1–8 | (Denmark) Copenhagen | 0–3 | 1–5 |

Third qualifying round
| Team 1 | Agg. | Team 2 | 1st leg | 2nd leg |
|---|---|---|---|---|
| Copenhagen (Denmark) | 1–1 (2–1 p) | (Czech Republic) Baník Ostrava | 1–0 | 0–1 (a.e.t.) |

==== League phase ====
| Pos | Team | Pld | W | D | L | GF | GA | GD | Pts | Qualification |
|---|---|---|---|---|---|---|---|---|---|---|
| 16 | (German Football Association) 1. FC Heidenheim | 6 | 3 | 1 | 2 | 7 | 7 | 0 | 10 | Advance to knockout phase play-offs (seeded) |
| 17 | (Royal Belgian Football Association) Gent | 6 | 3 | 0 | 3 | 8 | 8 | 0 | 9 | Advance to knockout phase play-offs (unseeded) |
| 18 | (Danish Football Association) Copenhagen | 6 | 2 | 2 | 2 | 8 | 9 | −1 | 8 | Advance to knockout phase play-offs (unseeded) |
| 19 | (Football Association of Iceland) Víkingur Reykjavík | 6 | 2 | 2 | 2 | 7 | 8 | −1 | 8 | Advance to knockout phase play-offs (unseeded) |
| 20 | (Football Association of Bosnia and Herzegovina) Borac Banja Luka | 6 | 2 | 2 | 2 | 4 | 7 | −3 | 8 | Advance to knockout phase play-offs (unseeded) |

Source: UEFA
Rules for classification: League phase tiebreakers

Knockout phase play-offs
| Team 1 | Agg. | Team 2 | 1st leg | 2nd leg |
|---|---|---|---|---|
| Copenhagen (Denmark) | 4–3 | (West Germany) 1. FC Heidenheim | 1–2 | 3–1 (a.e.t.) |

Knockout phase play-offs
| Team 1 | Agg. | Team 2 | 1st leg | 2nd leg |
|---|---|---|---|---|
| Copenhagen (Denmark) | 1–3 | (England) Chelsea | 1–2 | 0–1 |

== National teams ==
=== Men's senior ===
==== Results and fixtures ====
===== Friendlies =====
| 7 June 2025 | Denmark | 2–1 | Northern Ireland | Copenhagen, Denmark |
| 19:00 CET | Isaksen 45+2'; Eriksen 67' | Report | P. Højbjerg 6' (o.g.) | Stadium: Parken Stadium; Attendance: 22,151; Referee: Antoniou Menelaus (Cyprus) |

| 10 June 2025 | Denmark | 5–0 | Lithuania | Odense, Denmark |
| 19:00 CEST | Biereth 12'; Eriksen 18'; Dolberg 23'; Kristensen 48'; Dreyer 62' | Report | | Stadium: Odense Stadium; Attendance: 13,087; Referee: Rohit Saggi (Norway) |

===== 2024–25 UEFA Nations League =====
====== Group A4 ======
| Pos | Team | Pld | W | D | L | GF | GA | GD | Pts | Qualification or relegation | (Spain) | (Denmark) | (Serbia) | (Switzerland) |
|---|---|---|---|---|---|---|---|---|---|---|---|---|---|---|
| 1 | Spain | 6 | 5 | 1 | 0 | 13 | 4 | +9 | 16 | Advance to quarter-finals | — | 1–0 | 3–0 | 3–2 |
| 2 | Denmark | 6 | 2 | 2 | 2 | 7 | 5 | +2 | 8 | Advance to quarter-finals | 1–2 | — | 2–0 | 2–0 |
| 3 | Serbia (O) | 6 | 1 | 3 | 2 | 3 | 6 | −3 | 6 | Qualification for relegation play-offs | 0–0 | 0–0 | — | 2–0 |
| 4 | Switzerland (R) | 6 | 0 | 2 | 4 | 6 | 14 | −8 | 2 | Relegation to League B | 1–4 | 2–2 | 1–1 | — |

Source: UEFA
Rules for classification: Tiebreakers
(O) Play-off winners; (R) Relegated

| 5 September 2024 1 | Denmark | 2–0 | Switzerland | Copenhagen, Denmark |
| 20:45 CEST | Dorgu 82'; Højbjerg 90+2' | Report | | Stadium: Parken Stadium; Attendance: 26,024; Referee: Daniel Siebert (Germany) |

| 8 September 2024 2 | Denmark | 2–0 | Serbia | Copenhagen, Denmark |
| 18:00 CEST | Grønbæk 36'; Yurary 61' | Report | | Stadium: Parken Stadium; Attendance: 34,902; Referee: Chris Kavanagh (England) |

| 12 October 2024 3 | Spain | 1–0 | Denmark | Murcia, Spain |
| 20:45 CEST | Zubimendi 79' | Report | | Stadium: Estadio Nueva Condomina; Attendance: 29,870; Referee: Ivan Kružliak (Slovakia) |

| 15 October 2024 4 | Switzerland | 2–2 | Denmark | St. Gallen, Switzerland |
| 20:45 CEST | Freuler 26'; Amdouni 45+1' (pen.) | Report | Isaksen 27'; Eriksen 69' | Stadium: Kybunpark; Attendance: 16,182; Referee: Halil Umut Meler (Turkey) |

| 15 November 2024 5 | Denmark | 1–2 | Spain | Copenhagen, Denmark |
| 20:45 CET | Isaksen 84' | Report | Oyarzabal 15'; Pérez 58' | Stadium: Parken Stadium; Attendance: 36,985; Referee: Rade Obrenović (Slovenia) |

| 18 November 2024 6 | Serbia | 0–0 | Denmark | Leskovac, Serbia |
| 20:45 CET | | Report | | Stadium: Dubočica Stadium; Attendance: 7,295; Referee: Felix Zwayer (Germany) |

====== Knockout stage ======
| 20 March 2025 Quarter-finals 1st Leg | Denmark | 1–0 | Portugal | Copenhagen, Denmark |
| 20:45 CET | Højlund 78' | Report | | Stadium: Parken Stadium; Attendance: 36,322; Referee: Irfan Peljto (Bosnia and Herzegovina) |

| 23 March 2025 Quarter-finals 2nd Leg | Portugal | 5–2 (a.e.t.) (5–3 agg.) | Denmark | Lisbon, Portugal |
| 19:45 WET | Andersen 38' (o.g.); Ronaldo 72'; Trincão 86', 91'; Ramos 115' | Report | Kristensen 56'; Eriksen 76' | Stadium: Estádio José Alvalade; Attendance: 47,123; Referee: Slavko Vinčić (Slovenia) |

=== Women's senior ===
==== Results and fixtures ====
===== Friendlies =====
| 25 October 2024 | Denmark | 5–0 | South Africa | Aalborg, Denmark |
| 18:00 UTC+1 | Obaze 51'; Bruun 55', 57'; Vangsgaard 64'; Kühl 75' | | | Stadium: Aalborg Stadium; Attendance: 4,125; Referee: Ifeoma Kulmala (Finland) |

| 29 October 2024 | Denmark | 1–2 | Netherlands | Esbjerg, Denmark |
| 18:00 | Kramer 87' | | Brugts 26'; van de Donk 28' | Stadium: Esbjerg Stadium; Attendance: 5,414; Referee: Lotta Vuorio (Finland) |

| 2 December 2024 | Denmark | 2–0 | Iceland | Murcia, Spain |
| 18:00 UTC+1 | Bruun 16', 40' | Report | | Stadium: Pinatar Arena; Attendance: 105; Referee: Jana Adámková (Czechia) |

===== UEFA Women's Euro 2025 qualifying =====
====== League A2 ======
| Pos | Team | Pld | W | D | L | GF | GA | GD | Pts | Qualification | (Spain) | (Denmark) | (Belgium) | (Czech Republic) |
|---|---|---|---|---|---|---|---|---|---|---|---|---|---|---|
| 1 | Spain | 6 | 5 | 0 | 1 | 18 | 5 | +13 | 15 | Qualify for final tournament | — | 3–2 | 2–0 | 3–1 |
| 2 | Denmark | 6 | 4 | 0 | 2 | 14 | 8 | +6 | 12 | Qualify for final tournament | 0–2 | — | 4–2 | 2–0 |
| 3 | Belgium | 6 | 1 | 1 | 4 | 5 | 18 | −13 | 4 (Note: Head-to-head points: Belgium 4, Czech Republic 1.) | Advance to play-offs (seeded) | 0–7 | 0–3 | — | 1–1 |
| 4 | Czech Republic (R) | 6 | 1 | 1 | 4 | 6 | 12 | −6 | 4 | Advance to play-offs (seeded) and relegation to League B | 2–1 | 1–3 | 1–2 | — |

Source: UEFA
Rules for classification: Tiebreakers
(R) Relegated
Notes:

| 12 July 2024 | Belgium | 0–3 | Denmark | Sint-Truiden, Belgium |
| 20:00 UTC+1 | | Report | Cayman 60' (o.g.); Harder 65'; S. Holmgaard 82' | Stadium: Stayen; Attendance: 0 Referee: Ivana Martinčić (Croatia) |

| 16 July 2024 | Denmark | 2–0 | Czech Republic | Vejle, Denmark |
| 19:00 UTC+1 | Bruun 55'; Thomsen 63' | Report | | Stadium: Vejle Stadium; Attendance: 3,303; Referee: Abigail Byrne (England) |

===== 2025 UEFA Women's Nations League =====
====== League A4 ======
| Pos | Team | Pld | W | D | L | GF | GA | GD | Pts | Qualification or relegation | (Sweden) | (Italy) | (Denmark) | (Wales) |
|---|---|---|---|---|---|---|---|---|---|---|---|---|---|---|
| 1 | Sweden | 6 | 3 | 3 | 0 | 13 | 6 | +7 | 12 | Qualification for Nations League Finals | — | 3–2 | 6–1 | 1–1 |
| 2 | Italy | 6 | 3 | 1 | 2 | 11 | 7 | +4 | 10 | | 0–0 | — | 1–3 | 1–0 |
| 3 | Denmark (O) | 6 | 3 | 0 | 3 | 8 | 13 | −5 | 9 | Qualification for relegation play-offs | 1–2 | 0–3 | — | 1–0 |
| 4 | Wales (R) | 6 | 0 | 2 | 4 | 4 | 10 | −6 | 2 | Relegation to League B | 1–1 | 1–4 | 1–2 | — |

Source: UEFA
Rules for classification: Tiebreakers
(O) Play-off winners; (R) Relegated

| 21 February 2025 1 | Denmark | 1–2 | Sweden | Odense, Denmark |
| 19:15 | Harder 17' (pen.) | Report | Sembrant 6'; Rolfö 54' | Stadium: Odense Stadium; Attendance: 3,202; Referee: Riem Hussein (Germany) |

| 25 February 2025 2 | Italy | 1–3 | Denmark | La Spezia, Italy |
| 18:00 | Cambiaghi 58' | Report | Færge 53'; S. Holmgaard 74'; Thomsen 90+3' | Stadium: Stadio Alberto Picco; Referee: Olatz Rivera Olmedo (Spain) |

| 4 April 2025 3 | Wales | 1–2 | Denmark | Cardiff, Wales |
| 19:15 UTC+1 | Holland 34' | Report | Bruun 7'; Vangsgaard 72' | Stadium: Cardiff City Stadium; Attendance: 6,779; Referee: Michalina Diakow (Poland) |

| 8 April 2025 4 | Denmark | 0–3 | Italy | Herning, Denmark |
| 18:00 UTC+2 | | Report | Caruso 59'; Di Guglielmo 79'; Girelli 86' | Stadium: MCH Arena; Attendance: 5,166; Referee: Ivana Martinčić (Croatia) |

| 30 May 2025 5 | Denmark | 1–0 | Wales | Odense, Denmark |
| | | | | Stadium: Odense Stadium |

| 3 June 2025 6 | Sweden | 6–1 | Denmark | Solna, Sweden |
| | Blackstenius 1' 43' 53'; Rytting Kaneryd 5'; Angeldahl 11'; Hurtig 90+2' | Report | Thomsen 41' | Stadium: Strawberry Arena; Attendance: 12,428; Referee: Jana Adámková (Czechia) |

=== Women's under-23 ===
==== Results and fixtures ====
===== Friendlies =====
| 21 February 2025 | Denmark | 2–1 | Czech Republic | Olot, Spain |
| 13:00 UTC+1 | Walter 12'; Hashemi-Ghermezi 40' | Report | | Attendance: 12 |

| 25 February 2025 | Spain | 3–0 | Denmark | Madrid, Spain |
| 16:00 UTC+1 | | Report | | Stadium: La Ciudad del Fútbol; Attendance: 65 |

| 3 April 2025 | Denmark | 3–1 | Scotland | Murcia, Spain |
| 12:00 UTC+1 | Borbye 1'; Fløe 15', 72' | Report | | Stadium: Pinatar Arena; Attendance: 23 |

| 6 April 2025 | Denmark | 2–3 | France | Murcia, Spain |
| 18:00 UTC+1 | Fløe 27', 50' | Report | 39', 44', 60' | Stadium: Pinatar Arena; Attendance: 55 |

=== Men's under-21 ===
==== Results and fixtures ====
===== Friendlies =====
| 6 September 2024 | Iceland | 4–2 | Denmark | Reykjavík, Iceland |
| 17:00 | Ingason 28'; Sigurpálsson 40'; Ingason 73' (pen.); Ingason 75'; Thorkelsson (yellow card) 83' | Report | Osula 16'; Gaaei (yellow card) 49'; Kvistgaarden 52'; Otoa (red card) 71' | Stadium: Víkingsvöllur; Attendance: 305; Referee: Oleksiy Derevinskyi (Ukraine) |

| 15 November 2024 | Germany | 3–0 | Denmark | Aachen, Germany |
| 18:00 | Tresoldi 5'; Brown 48'; Moukoko 81' | Report | | Stadium: New Tivoli; Attendance: 11,872; Referee: Alex Bos (Netherlands) |

| 19 November 2024 | Spain | 2–1 | Denmark | Albacete, Spain |
| 19:00 | Guerra 13'; Bajcetic (yellow card) 15'; Joseph 26'; Jauregizar (yellow card) 71' | Report | Jensen (yellow card) 29'; Andersen (yellow card) 70'; Chukwuani 90+3' | Stadium: Carlos Belmonte; Attendance: 17,524; Referee: Marc Nagtegaal (Netherlands) |

| 20 March 2025 | Poland | 3–3 | Denmark | Belek, Turkey |
| 14:00 | Kozłowski 15'; Pyrka 56'; Mosór 87' | Report | Jørgensen 65'; Kjerrumgaard 69'; Hansen 86' | Stadium: Calista Field; Attendance: 134; Referee: Halim Kolancı (Turkey) |

| 24 March 2025 | Italy | 1–1 | Denmark | Cittadella, Italy |
| 18:15 | Prati 21' | Report | Sørensen 21' | Stadium: Stadio Pier Cesare Tombolato |

===== 2025 UEFA European Under-21 Championship qualification =====
====== Group I ======
| Pos | Team | Pld | W | D | L | GF | GA | GD | Pts | Qualification | Denmark | Czech Republic | Wales | Iceland | Lithuania |
|---|---|---|---|---|---|---|---|---|---|---|---|---|---|---|---|
| 1 | Denmark | 8 | 5 | 2 | 1 | 18 | 8 | +10 | 17 | Final tournament | — | 5–0 | 2–2 | 2–0 | 3–0 |
| 2 | Czech Republic | 8 | 4 | 2 | 2 | 13 | 11 | +2 | 14 (Note: Head-to-head points: Czech Republic 4, Wales 1) | Play-offs | 0–0 | — | 1–1 | 4–1 | 3–0 |
| 3 | Wales | 8 | 4 | 2 | 2 | 13 | 11 | +2 | 14 | | 1–2 | 1–2 | — | 1–0 | 2–1 |
| 4 | Iceland | 8 | 3 | 0 | 5 | 9 | 14 | −5 | 9 | | 4–2 | 2–1 | 1–2 | — | 0–2 |
| 5 | Lithuania | 8 | 1 | 0 | 7 | 7 | 16 | −9 | 3 | | 1–2 | 1–2 | 2–3 | 0–1 | — |

Source: UEFA
Rules for classification: Tiebreakers
Notes:

| 10 September 2024 | Denmark | 5–0 | Czech Republic | Vejle, Denmark |
| | Bøving 28'; Biereth 48'; Sørensen 54' (pen.); Kristensen 61'; Kvistgaarden 87' | Report | | Stadium: Vejle Stadium; Attendance: 2,595; Referee: Alessandro Dudic (Switzerland) |

| 15 October 2024 | Denmark | 2–0 | Iceland | Vejle, Denmark |
| | Kruse (yellow card) 1'; Chukwuani 32'; Kvistgaarden 59'; Jelert (yellow card) 66'; Harder (yellow card) 89' | Report | Lúðvíksson (yellow card) 49'; Karlsson (yellow card) 83'; Róbertsson (yellow card) 86' | Stadium: Vejle Stadium; Attendance: 3,386; Referee: Snir Levi (Israel) |

===== 2025 UEFA European Under-21 Championship =====
====== Group D ======
| Pos | Team | Pld | W | D | L | GF | GA | GD | Pts | Qualification |
|---|---|---|---|---|---|---|---|---|---|---|
| 1 | Denmark | 3 | 2 | 1 | 0 | 7 | 5 | +2 | 7 | Knockout stage |
| 2 | Netherlands | 3 | 1 | 1 | 1 | 5 | 4 | +1 | 4 | Knockout stage |
| 3 | Ukraine | 3 | 1 | 0 | 2 | 4 | 5 | −1 | 3 | |
| 4 | Finland | 3 | 0 | 2 | 1 | 4 | 6 | −2 | 2 | |

Source: UEFA
Rules for classification: Group stage tiebreakers

| 12 June 2025 | Ukraine | 2–3 | Denmark | Prešov, Slovakia |
| 18:00 | Voloshyn 22'; Roman (yellow card) 33'; Braharu (yellow card) 54'; Braharu 78' | Report | Bak Jensen (yellow card) 54'; Bischoff 54'; Bøving (yellow card) 81'; Osula (yellow card) 85' | Stadium: Futbal Tatran Arena; Attendance: 5458; Referee: Goga Kikacheishvili (Georgia) |

| 15 June 2025 | Netherlands | 1–2 | Denmark | Prešov, Slovakia |
| 21:00 | Provstgaard 19' (o.g.) | Report | Osula 35', 47' | Stadium: Futbal Tatran Arena; Attendance: 5,434; Referee: Simone Sozza (Italy) |

| 18 June 2025 | Denmark | 2–2 | Finland | Košice, Slovakia |
| 18:00 | Harder 10', 68' | Report | Skyttä 73'; Keskinen 82' | Stadium: Košická futbalová aréna Attendance: 6,940; Referee: Damian Sylwestrzak (Poland) |

====== Knockout stage ======
| 22 June 2025 Quarter-finals | Denmark | 2–3 | France | Prešov, Slovakia |
| 18:00 | Bischoff 18'; Sørensen 49' | Report | Cissé 44'; Merlin 84'; Tel 85' | Stadium: Futbal Tatran Arena; Attendance: 5,513; Referee: Sander van der Eijk (Netherlands) |

=== Men's under-20 ===
==== Results and fixtures ====
===== Friendlies =====
| 7 September 2024 | Sweden | 0–1 | Denmark | Hörby, Sweden |
| 14:00 UTC+2 | | Report | Schlichting 1' | Stadium: Hörby IP; Attendance: 838; Referee: Dino Demo (Sweden) |

| 10 September 2024 | Sweden | 1–4 | Denmark | Hässleholm, Sweden |
| 19:00 UTC+2 | Neffati 77' | Report | Meister 3'; Bischoff 63'; Kjerrumgaard 70', 89' | Stadium: Österås IP; Attendance: 0 Referee: Mohamed Rachid (Sweden) |

| 16 November 2024 | France | 1–1 | Denmark | Marbella, Spain |
| 13:00 UTC+1 | Jacquet 45' | Report | Foss 90' | Stadium: Banús Football Center; Attendance: 53 |

| 18 November 2024 | South Korea | 2–4 | Denmark | Marbella, Spain |
| 10:30 UTC+1 | Jeong-woo 12'; Geon-hee 19' | Report | Christensen 41'; Sandgrav 77'; Andersen 81'; Schlichting 90' | Stadium: Banús Football Center; Attendance: 57 |

===== 2025 Maurice Revello Tournament =====
====== Group B ======
| Pos | Team | Pld | W | OTW | OTL | L | GF | GA | GD | Pts | Qualification |
|---|---|---|---|---|---|---|---|---|---|---|---|
| 1 | Denmark | 3 | 2 | 1 | 0 | 0 | 8 | 3 | +5 | 8 | Advance to knockout stage |
| 2 | Mexico | 3 | 0 | 1 | 2 | 0 | 7 | 7 | 0 | 4 | Advance to knockout stage |
| 3 | Japan | 3 | 1 | 0 | 1 | 1 | 3 | 4 | −1 | 4 | Advance to fifth place playoff |
| 4 | Congo | 3 | 0 | 1 | 0 | 2 | 3 | 7 | −4 | 2 | Advance to seventh place playoff |

Source: Maurice Revello Tournament

| 4 June 2025 | Mexico | 3–3 (4–5 p) | Denmark | Fos-sur-Mer, France |
| 16:30 UTC+1 | Virgen 45+2'; Uribe 83'; Jiménez 90+7' | Report | Vester 11'; Rohd 69', 90+4' | Stadium: Stade Parsemain; Referee: Ermis Çelaj (Albania) |
| | Penalties |
| | Jurado (penalty scored); Carrillo (penalty scored); Jiménez (penalty scored); Padilla (penalty scored); Uribe (penalty missed) | | (penalty scored) Enggård; (penalty scored) Nielsen; (penalty scored) Beck; (penalty scored) Opoku; (penalty scored) Rohd |

| 7 June 2025 | Denmark | 2–0 | Congo | Avignon, France |
| 16:30 UTC+1 | Enggård 27' (pen.); Obi 90+5' | Report | | Stadium: Parc des Sports; Referee: Khaled Al-Ahmari (Saudi Arabia) |

| 10 June 2025 | Denmark | 3–0 | Japan | Aubagne, France |
| 13:00 UTC+1 | Obi 5'; Nakamura 78' (o.g.); Simmelhack 85' | Report | | Stadium: Stade de Lattre-de-Tassigny; Referee: Alexandra Collin (France) |

====== Knockout stage ======
| 13 June 2025 Semi-finals | Denmark | 3–4 | Saudi Arabia | Salon-de-Provence, France |
| 13:00 UTC+1 | Christensen 20'; Beck 64'; Lyng 90+3' (pen.) | Report | Al-Jaber 4', 53'; Radif 11'; Al-Alaeli 45' | Stadium: Stade d'Honneur Marcel Roustan, Attendance: 350; Referee: Ermis Çelaj (Albania) |

=== Men's under-19 ===
==== Results and fixtures ====
===== Friendlies =====
| 5 September 2024 | Sweden | 0–4 | Denmark | Askim, Norway |
| 18:00 UTC+2 | | Report | Mikkelsen 63'; Thames 83'; Jensen 86'; Gogorza 90' | Stadium: Askim Stadium; Attendance: 87 |

| 8 September 2024 | Norway | 1–1 | Denmark | Askim, Norway |
| 12:00 UTC+2 | Gonstad 57' | Report | Chiakha 28' | Stadium: Askim Stadium; Attendance: 791 |

| 9 October 2024 | France | 1–1 | Denmark | Marbella, Spain |
| 14:00 UTC+1 | Nouneb 50' | Report | Jensen 84' | Stadium: Banús Football Center 1 Attendance: 211 |

| 12 October 2024 | Portugal | 3–1 | Denmark | Marbella, Spain |
| 12:00 UTC+1 | Mayland 24' (o.g.); Silva 78'; Sousa 88' | Report | Chiakha 79' | Stadium: Banús Football Center 1 Attendance: 157 |

| 15 October 2024 | Belgium | 1–3 | Denmark | Marbella, Spain |
| 13:00 UTC+1 | Bawuah 15' | Report | Chiakha 52'; Thames 65', 71' | Stadium: Banús Football Center 1 Attendance: 89 |

| 14 May 2025 | Denmark | 1–1 | Germany | Horsens, Denmark |
| 12:00 UTC+2 | Thames 45' | Report | Wurm 40' | Stadium: Nordstern Arena; Attendance: 2,300 |

===== 2024 UEFA European Under-19 Championship =====
| Pos | Team | Pld | W | D | L | GF | GA | GD | Pts | Qualification |
|---|---|---|---|---|---|---|---|---|---|---|
| 1 | France | 3 | 2 | 1 | 0 | 8 | 5 | +3 | 7 | Knockout stage and 2025 FIFA U-20 World Cup |
| 2 | Spain | 3 | 1 | 2 | 0 | 5 | 4 | +1 | 5 | Knockout stage and 2025 FIFA U-20 World Cup |
| 3 | Turkey | 3 | 0 | 2 | 1 | 5 | 6 | −1 | 2 | FIFA U-20 World Cup play-off |
| 4 | Denmark | 3 | 0 | 1 | 2 | 6 | 9 | −3 | 1 | |

Source: UEFA
Rules for classification: Group stage tiebreakers

====== Group B ======
| 16 July 2024 | Denmark | 1–2 | Spain | Larne, Northern Ireland |
| 16:30 UTC+2 | Krüger-Johnsen 43' | Report | Andrés 26'; Bravo 79' | Stadium: Inver Park; Attendance: 622; Referee: Sander van der Eijk (Netherlands) |

| 19 July 2024 | Denmark | 2–4 | France | Larne, Northern Ireland |
| 16:30 UTC+2 | Olsson 87'; Simmelhack 90+3' | Report | Bahoya 19'; Aiki 65'; Bouabré 80'; Assoumani 85' | Stadium: Inver Park; Attendance: 672; Referee: Luka Bilbija (Bosnia and Herzegovina) |

| 22 July 2024 | Turkey | 3–3 | Denmark | Belfast, Northern Ireland |
| 20:00 UTC+2 | Bars 27'; Yıldırım 53'; Sarıkaya 70' | Report | Schwartau 18'; Krüger-Johnsen 64'; Simmelhack 76' | Stadium: Seaview; Attendance: 531; Referee: Ishmael Barbara (Malta) |

===== 2025 UEFA European Under-19 Championship qualification =====
====== Qualifying round ======
| Pos | Team | Pld | W | D | L | GF | GA | GD | Pts | Qualification |
|---|---|---|---|---|---|---|---|---|---|---|
| 1 | Denmark | 3 | 3 | 0 | 0 | 8 | 2 | +6 | 9 | Elite round |
| 2 | Israel | 3 | 2 | 0 | 1 | 11 | 4 | +7 | 6 | Elite round |
| 3 | Northern Ireland | 3 | 1 | 0 | 2 | 2 | 7 | −5 | 3 | |
| 4 | Albania (H) | 3 | 0 | 0 | 3 | 0 | 8 | −8 | 0 | |

Source: UEFA
Rules for classification: Tiebreakers
(H) Hosts

| 13 November 2024 | Northern Ireland | 0–4 | Denmark | Durrës, Albania |
| | | Report | Gogorza 18', 26'; Schwartau 21'; Juul-Sandberg 32' | Stadium: Niko Dovana Stadium; Referee: Martin Dohal (Slovakia) |

| 16 November 2024 | Denmark | 1–0 | Albania | Elbasan, Albania |
| | Jensen 37' | Report | | Stadium: Elbasan Arena; Referee: Joonas Jaanovits (Estonia) |

| 19 November 2024 | Denmark | 3–2 | Israel | Tirana, Albania |
| | Themsen 35'; Schwartau 39' (pen.); Gogorza 61' | Report | Abu Farchi 47'; Oli 86' | Stadium: House of Football Natural Pitch; Referee: Oleksii Derevinskyi (Ukraine) |

====== Elite round ======
| Pos | Team | Pld | W | D | L | GF | GA | GD | Pts | Promotion |
|---|---|---|---|---|---|---|---|---|---|---|
| 1 | Denmark | 3 | 3 | 0 | 0 | 5 | 1 | +4 | 9 | Qualified for the final tournament |
| 2 | Austria | 3 | 2 | 0 | 1 | 7 | 4 | +3 | 6 | |
| 3 | Hungary (H) | 3 | 1 | 0 | 2 | 2 | 4 | −2 | 3 | |
| 4 | Iceland | 3 | 0 | 0 | 3 | 1 | 6 | −5 | 0 | |

Source: UEFA
Rules for classification: Qualification tiebreakers
(H) Hosts

| 19 March 2025 | Denmark | 2–0 | Iceland | Hajdúszoboszló, Hungary |
| 15:00 | Schwartau 35'; Símonarson 45+1' (o.g.) | Report | | Stadium: Bocskai Stadion; Referee: Mohammad Usman Aslam (Norway) |

| 22 March 2025 | Denmark | 1–0 | Hungary | Nyíregyháza, Hungary |
| 15:00 | Gogorza 66' | Report | | Stadium: Városi Stadion; Referee: Pavle Ilić (Serbia) |

| 25 March 2025 | Austria | 1–2 | Denmark | Hajdúszoboszló, Hungary |
| 15:00 | Spalt 55' | Report | Larsen 69'; Gogorza 74' | Stadium: Bocskai Stadion; Referee: Mohammad Usman Aslam (Norway) |

===== 2025 UEFA European Under-19 Championship =====
====== Group A ======
| Pos | Team | Pld | W | D | L | GF | GA | GD | Pts | Qualification |
|---|---|---|---|---|---|---|---|---|---|---|
| 1 | Spain | 3 | 3 | 0 | 0 | 9 | 1 | +8 | 9 | Knockout stage |
| 2 | Romania (H) | 3 | 2 | 0 | 1 | 6 | 4 | +2 | 6 | Knockout stage |
| 3 | Denmark | 3 | 1 | 0 | 2 | 5 | 4 | +1 | 3 | |
| 4 | Montenegro | 3 | 0 | 0 | 3 | 1 | 12 | −11 | 0 | |

Source: UEFA
Rules for classification: Group stage tiebreakers
(H) Hosts

| 13 June 2025 | Spain | 1–0 | Denmark | Bucharest, Hungary |
| 17:00 UTC+3 | Merino 45' | Report | | Stadium: Rapid-Giulești Stadium; Attendance: 731; Referee: Lothar D'hondt (Belgium) |

| 16 June 2025 | Denmark | 5–0 | Montenegro | Bucharest, Hungary |
| 17:00 UTC+3 | Berthelsen 9'; Themsen 32', 52'; Agyekum 68', 74' | Report | | Stadium: Rapid-Giulești Stadium; Attendance: 389; Referee: Antoni Bandić (Bosnia and Herzegovina) |

| 19 June 2025 | Denmark | 0–3 | Romania | Bucharest, Hungary |
| 19:00 UTC+3 | | Report | Guțea 34'; Barbu 58'; Vermeșan 77' | Stadium: Arcul de Triumf Stadium; Attendance: 6,133; Referee: Andrea Colombo (Italy) |

=== Women's under-19 ===
==== Results and fixtures ====
===== Friendlies =====
| 23 October 2024 | Portugal | 0–3 | Denmark | Lisbon, Portugal |
| | | Report | Kristensen 24'; Lund 62'; Littrup 90' | Stadium: Cidade do Futebol; Attendance: 114 |

| 26 October 2024 | Czech Republic | 0–2 | Denmark | Mafra, Portugal |
| | | Report | Kristensen 24'; Uhd 72' | Stadium: Campo das Seixas; Attendance: 14 |

| 29 October 2024 | Denmark | 1–3 | Italy | Mafra, Portugal |
| | Kristensen 21' | Report | Fadda 20'; Ferrearsi 64'; Aastrup 68' (o.g.) | Stadium: Complexo Desportivo Eng.o Ministro dos Santos; Attendance: 14 |

| 22 February 2025 | Norway | 2–1 | Denmark | Benidorm, Spain |
| | Fenger 5'; Pettersen 21' | Report | Laursen 54' | Stadium: Melia Villaitana; Attendance: 74 |

| 25 February 2025 | Italy | 2–2 | Denmark | La Nucia, Spain |
| | Holt 54' | Report | Wendicke 75' | Stadium: Estadi Olímpic Camilo Cano; Attendance: 64 |

| 29 February 2025 | Sweden | 0–1 | Denmark | Borgholm, Sweden |
| | | Report | Moesgaard 35' | Stadium: Ekerum Öland; Attendance: 181 |

| 1 June 2025 | Sweden | 2–3 | Denmark | Borgholm, Sweden |
| | Sjöström 39'; Rolfsson 74' | Report | Strauss 36', 60'; Höjer 90' | Stadium: Ekerum Öland; Attendance: 137 |

===== 2025 UEFA Women's Under-19 Championship qualification =====
====== First round ======
| 27 November 2024 1 | Greece | 0–2 | Denmark | Duisburg, Germany |
| | | Report | Aagaard 7'; Vestermark 31' | Stadium: Leichtathletikstadion; Referee: Ainara Acevedo (Spain) |

| 30 November 2024 2 | Denmark | 2–0 | Kosovo | Duisburg, Germany |
| | Hoxha 33' (o.g.); Vestermark 90+1' | Report | | Stadium: Leichtathletikstadion; Referee: Ainara Acevedo (Spain) |

| 3 December 2024 3 | Denmark | 1–5 | Germany | Duisburg, Germany |
| | Valvik 51' | Report | Gonzalez 7', 39'; Scholz 24'; Krüger 32'; Boboy 53' (pen.) | Stadium: Sportschule Wedau; Referee: Michaela Pachtova (Czech Republic) |

====== Second round ======
| 2 April 2025 1 | Greece | 1–2 | Denmark | Assen, Netherlands |
| | Platania 56' | Report | Antvorskov 58'; Aagaard 68' | Stadium: Sportpark Marsdijk; Referee: Miriama Bočková (Slovakia) |

| 5 April 2025 2 | Denmark | 2–0 | Romania | Veendam, Netherlands |
| | Aagaard 22'; Højer 79' | Report | | Stadium: De Langeleegte; Referee: Miriama Bočková (Slovakia) |

| 8 April 2025 3 | Denmark | 0–1 | Netherlands | Veendam, Netherlands |
| | | Report | Weerelts 52' | Stadium: De Langeleegte; Referee: Merima Čelik (Bosnia and Herzegovina) |

=== Men's under-18 ===
==== Results and fixtures ====
===== Friendlies =====
| 7 September 2024 | Norway | 3–5 | Denmark | Örebro, Sweden |
| 16:00 UTC+2 | Lægreid 32'; Røssing-Lelesiit 64', 81' | Report | Martin 31', 85', 87'; Höjer 83'; Obi 87' | Stadium: Trängens IP; Attendance: 197; Referee: Petter Twig (Sweden) |

| 10 September 2024 | Sweden | 1–0 | Denmark | Örebro, Sweden |
| 18:00 UTC+2 | Andersson 84' | Report | | Stadium: Trängens IP; Attendance: 653; Referee: Ahmed Abid (Sweden) |

| 11 October 2024 | Morocco | 1–1 | Denmark | Rabat, Morocco |
| 19:00 UTC+1 | Guelet 4' | Report | Schjøtt 90' | Attendance: 45; Referee: Omar Rahim (Morocco) |

| 14 October 2024 | Morocco | 0–4 | Denmark | Rabat, Morocco |
| 16:00 UTC+1 | | Report | Gøthler 38', 73'; Hyseni 41'; Rasmussen 74' | Attendance: 50; Referee: Abderrahmane Drhourhi (Morocco) |

| 13 November 2024 | Denmark | 2–1 | Finland | Copenhagen, Denmark |
| 17:00 UTC+1 | Hyseni 45', 90' | Report | Nzoko 63' | Stadium: Herlev Stadium; Attendance: 978; Referee: Jonas Hansen (Denmark) |

| 15 November 2024 | Denmark | 1–2 | Finland | Copenhagen, Denmark |
| 13:00 UTC+1 | Obi 37' | Report | Daldum 90'; Nzoko 90' | Stadium: Herlev Stadium; Attendance: 1,007; Referee: Jesper Nielsen (Denmark) |

| 20 March 2025 | Denmark | 0–1 | Netherlands | San Pedro del Pinatar, Spain |
| 19:00 UTC+1 | | Report | Thomas 11' | Stadium: Pinatar Arena; Attendance: 125; Referee: Miguel Garcia (Spain) |

| 23 March 2025 | Denmark | 4–2 | Wales | San Pedro del Pinatar, Spain |
| 12:00 UTC+1 | Gøthler 47'; Møller 50'; Jørgensen 77'; Hyseni 90' | Report | Kasvosve 15'; Jagielka 57' | Stadium: Pinatar Arena; Attendance: 100 |

| 14 May 2025 | Germany | 1–0 | Denmark | Göttingen, Germany |
| 12:00 UTC+1 | Sauck 2' | Report | | Attendance: 1,803; Referee: André Blank (Germany) |

=== Men's under-17 ===
==== Results and fixtures ====
===== Friendlies =====
| 1 August 2024 | Denmark | 3–2 | Finland | Sundsvall, Sweden |
| 18:30 UTC+2 | Mandrup 9', 43', 77' | Report | Lehtomäki 15', 47' | Stadium: Baldershov IP; Attendance: 87; Referee: Fredrik Oppong (Sweden) |

| 3 August 2024 | Denmark | 2–2 | Norway | Sundsvall, Sweden |
| 13:00 UTC+2 | Steffensen 41'; Larsen 45' | Report | Krosa 45+5'; Dahlstrøm 51' | Stadium: Släda IP; Attendance: 183; Referee: Fredrik Oppong (Sweden) |

| 6 August 2024 | Sweden | 2–2 | Denmark | Sundsvall, Sweden |
| 18:30 UTC+2 | Sadarangani 62'; Saeed 90' | Report | Pimpong 55', 74' | Stadium: Baldershov IP; Attendance: 1,312; Referee: Johan Grundt (Norway) |

| 5 September 2024 | Denmark | 2–1 | Republic of Ireland | Murcia, Spain |
| 19:00 UTC+1 | Steffensen 48'; Ambæk 54' | Report | | Stadium: Pinatar Arena; Attendance: 0 |

| 8 September 2024 | Republic of Ireland | 0–2 | Denmark | Murcia, Spain |
| 10:00 UTC+1 | | Report | Pimpong 39'; Larsen 69' | Stadium: Pinatar Arena; Attendance: 0 |

| 14 February 2025 | Germany | 4–0 | Denmark | Algarve, Portugal |
| 15:00 UTC | Gashi 22'; Bekir 33'; Staff 37'; Crete 72' | Report | | Attendance: 0 |

| 16 February 2025 | Portugal | 0–0 | Denmark | Algarve, Portugal |
| 10:00 UTC | | Report | | Attendance: 0 |

| 19 February 2025 | Denmark | 1–3 | Spain | Algarve, Portugal |
| 10:00 UTC | Pimpong 66' | Report | Bonel 1', 29'; Oyono 88' | Attendance: 0 |

===== 2025 UEFA European Under-17 Championship qualification =====
====== First round ======
| 9 October 2024 | Luxembourg | 0–3 | Denmark | Kolding, Denmark |
| 16:00 | | Report | Ambæk 19', 44', 53' | Stadium: Kolding Stadium; Attendance: 1,102; Referee: Danilo Nikolić (Serbia) |

| 15 October 2024 | Denmark | 0–1 | Austria | Haderslev, Denmark |
| 15:00 | | | Moser 58' | Stadium: Haderslev Stadium; Referee: Tom Owen (Wales) |

====== Second round ======
| 19 March 2025 | Denmark | 3–1 | Greece | Dax, France |
| 18:00 | Panduro 10'; Al-Najar 65'; Pimpong 90' | Report | Souvlatzis 71' | Stadium: Plaine des Sports; Referee: Oguzhan Çakir (Türkiye) |

| 22 March 2025 | France | 4–1 | Denmark | Dax, France |
| 15:00 | Azizi 22'; Nguessan 28', 36'; Mbaye 52' | Report | Ambæk 31' | Stadium: Plaine des Sports; Referee: Dalibor Černý (Czechia) |

| 25 March 2025 | Finland | 5–2 | Denmark | Dax, France |
| 16:00 | Okungbowa 50', 88'; Søndenbroe 61' (o.g.); Katz 64', 76' (pen.) | Report | Pimpong 20'; Fuglsang 45+1' | Stadium: Stade André Darrigade; Referee: Dalibor Černý (Czechia) |

=== Women's under-17 ===
==== Results and fixtures ====
===== Friendlies =====
| 21 September 2024 | Denmark | 1–2 | Germany | Kolding, Denmark |
| 14:00 UTC+2 | Strauss 64' | Report | Wrede 62'; Wrigge 76' | Stadium: Mosevej Stadium; Attendance: 532; Referee: Jonas Bøgelund (Denmark) |

| 24 September 2024 | Denmark | 1–2 | Germany | Kolding, Denmark |
| 16:00 UTC+2 | Olander 13' | Report | | Stadium: Kolding Stadium; Attendance: 743; Referee: Julie Thomsen (Denmark) |

| 23 October 2024 | Denmark | 0–2 | Sweden | Nexø, Denmark |
| 14:00 UTC+2 | | Report | | Stadium: Nexø Stadium; Attendance: 258 |

| 26 October 2024 | Denmark | 1–1 | Sweden | Nexø, Denmark |
| 14:00 UTC+2 | Lundberg 14' | Report | Modstander 19' | Stadium: Nexø Stadium; Attendance: 681 |

| 22 January 2025 | Wales | 0–1 | Denmark | Lagos, Portugal |
| 19:00 UTC+1 | | Report | Petersen 40' | Stadium: Estádio Municipal; Attendance: 132 |

| 25 January 2025 | Denmark | 5–3 | Iceland | Lagos, Portugal |
| 11:00 UTC+1 | Domino 43'; Mott 46'; Thierry 50'; Lundberg 70'; Krüger-Johnsen 89' | Report | | Stadium: Estádio Municipal; Attendance: 33 |

| 28 January 2025 | Portugal | 2–1 | Denmark | Lagos, Portugal |
| 12:00 UTC+1 | | Report | Thierry 50' | Stadium: Estádio Municipal; Attendance: 51 |

===== 2025 UEFA Women's Under-17 Championship qualification =====
====== First round ======
| 14 November 2024 | Denmark | 1–1 | Austria | L'Alfàs del Pi, Spain |
| 15:30 | Jørgensen 16' | Report | Lueger 77' | Stadium: Estadio Polideportivo Municipal Pau Gasol; Referee: Anastasiya Romanyuk (Ukraine) |

| 17 November 2024 | Spain | 3–0 | Denmark | L'Alfàs del Pi, Spain |
| 11:00 | Carvajal 34'; Chacón 37', 66' | Report | | Stadium: Estadio Polideportivo Municipal Pau Gasol; Attendance: 112; Referee: Eglantina Pjetrushaj (Albania) |

| 20 November 2024 | Republic of Ireland | 2–3 | Denmark | Alicante, Spain |
| 11:00 | Butler 71'; Kelly 90+3' | Report | Thierry 41', 57'; Domino 79' | Stadium: Campo Municipal Antonio Solana; Attendance: 55; Referee: Laura Mauricio (Switzerland) |

====== Second round ======
| 17 March 2025 | Denmark | 0–4 | Austria | Kelsterbach, Germany |
| 16:00 | | Report | Pamminger 39', 43', 70'; Lueger 46' | Stadium: Sportpark Kelsterbach; Attendance: 128; Referee: Karoline Marie Jensen (Norway) |

| 20 March 2025 | Germany | 0–1 | Denmark | Frankfurt, Germany |
| 12:00 | | Report | Strauss 72' (pen.) | Stadium: DFB-Campus; Attendance: 151; Referee: Ioanna Allayiotou (Cyprus) |

| 23 March 2025 | Kosovo | 0–7 | Denmark | Kelsterbach, Germany |
| 15:00 | | Report | Karstensen 8'; Jørgensen 22'; Mott 49'; Strauss 51', 90+3'; Asllanaj 55' (o.g.); Lundberg 58' (pen.) | Stadium: Sportpark Kelsterbach; Attendance: 278; Referee: Elisabet Calvo Valentín (Spain) |

=== Men's under-16 ===
==== Results and fixtures ====
===== Friendlies =====
| 14 September 2024 | Denmark | 2–1 | Portugal | Kayseri, Turkey |
| 13:00 UTC+3 | Petersen 50'; Jørgensen 90+6' | Report | | Stadium: Erciyes Yüksek İrtifa Camp Center; Attendance: 0 |

| 16 September 2024 | Turkey | 4–2 | Denmark | Kayseri, Turkey |
| 16:00 UTC+3 | Tyrkiet 22', 37', 45', 48' | Report | Mortensen 11'; Khatar 74' | Stadium: Erciyes Yüksek İrtifa Camp Center; Attendance: 0 |

| 18 September 2024 | Denmark | 1–0 | Romania | Kayseri, Turkey |
| 11:00 UTC+3 | Hansen 84' | Report | | Stadium: Erciyes Yüksek İrtifa Camp Center; Attendance: 0 |

| 14 November 2024 | Denmark | 4–0 | Saudi Arabia | Salou, Spain |
| 17:00 UTC+1 | Thomsen 31'; Thieler 49'; Khatar 77'; Hansen 82' | Report | | Stadium: Mediterranean Sports Village; Attendance: 0 |

| 15 November 2024 | Poland | 0–1 | Denmark | Salou, Spain |
| 15:00 UTC+1 | | Report | Khatar 43' | Stadium: Mediterranean Sports Village; Attendance: 0 |

| 18 November 2024 | Denmark | 2–0 | South Korea | Salou, Spain |
| 15:00 UTC+1 | Nicolaisen 39'; Hansen 70' | Report | | Stadium: Mediterranean Sports Village; Attendance: 0 |

| 8 April 2025 | Switzerland | 1–4 | Denmark | Basel, Switzerland |
| 17:00 UTC+1 | | Report | Nicolaisen 11'; Khatar 19', 53'; Bastrup 90+3' | Stadium: Sportanlagen Schützenmatte; Attendance: 2,100 |

| 10 April 2025 | Switzerland | 1–5 | Denmark | Basel, Switzerland |
| 13:00 UTC+1 | | Report | Vestergaard 11'; Svengaard 25'; Mehicic 34'; Khatar 60'; Chukwuani 90+2' | Stadium: Sportanlagen Schützenmatte; Attendance: 1,600 |

===== 2025 UEFA U-16 Development Tournament =====
| 28 February 2025 | Denmark | 2–1 | France | Murcia, Spain |
| 12:00 UTC+1 | Nicolaisen 65'; Khatar 72' | Report | Christ 4' | Stadium: Pinatar Arena |

| 2 March 2025 | England | 7–3 | Denmark | Murcia, Spain |
| 15:00 UTC+1 | 6', 9', 19', 50', 54', 73', 89' | Report | Chukwuani 22'; Thomsen 79'; Khatar 80' | Stadium: Pinatar Arena |

| 5 March 2025 | Denmark | 3–0 | Colombia | Murcia, Spain |
| 19:00 UTC+1 | Khatar 53'; Popalzai 81'; Friis 83' | Report | | Stadium: Pinatar Arena |

=== Women's under-16 ===
==== Results and fixtures ====
===== Friendlies =====
| 1 July 2024 | Denmark | 0–5 | Netherlands | Finland |
| 17:30 UTC+2 | | Report | | Attendance: 72; Referee: Amane Kandas (Sweden) |

| 4 July 2024 | Denmark | 1–0 | Iceland | Finland |
| 17:30 UTC+2 | Mott 59' | Report | | Attendance: 86; Referee: Maren Hat Fat (Norway) |

| 7 July 2024 | Denmark | 4–3 | Sweden | Finland |
| 10:00 UTC+2 | Karstensen 16'; Jørgensen 55'; Lundberg 93', 106' | Report | | Attendance: 61; Referee: Kaur Jasmine (Finland) |

| 17 September 2024 | Denmark | 2–1 | Switzerland | Varde, Denmark |
| 17:00 UTC+2 | Fredsted 5'; Nielsen 42' | Report | Nein 9' | Stadium: Varde Stadium; Attendance: 416 |

| 20 September 2024 | Denmark | 3–2 | Switzerland | Grindsted, Denmark |
| 11:00 UTC+2 | Petersen 27'; Ebbesvik 59'; Bischoff 64' | Report | Leutwyler 43'; Nein 83' | Stadium: Grindsted Stadium; Attendance: 550 |

| 13 November 2024 | Denmark | 3–0 | Sweden | Herning, Denmark |
| 13:00 UTC+2 | Fredsted 8', 21'; Lynnerup 90+3' | Report | | Stadium: Brick Park Stadium |

| 16 November 2024 | Denmark | 3–0 | Sweden | Herning, Denmark |
| 13:00 UTC+2 | Stokholm 44'; Jeppsen 57'; Fredsted 64' | Report | | Stadium: Brick Park Stadium |

| 7 February 2025 | England | 1–0 | Denmark | Staffordshire, England |
| 13:00 UTC | Burton 7' | Report | | Stadium: St George's Park |

| 9 February 2025 | England | 2–1 | Denmark | Staffordshire, England |
| 12:00 UTC | Sielaczek 14'; Burton 45' | Report | Sea 86' | Stadium: St George's Park |

| 4 March 2025 | Finland | 1–0 | Denmark | Tammela, Finland |
| 16:30 UTC+2 | Lamberg 41' | Report | | Stadium: Eerikkilä Arena; Referee: Lehtovaara Vili (Finland) |

| 7 March 2025 | Finland | 2–3 | Denmark | Tammela, Finland |
| 10:30 UTC+2 | Selkäla 70', 90+1' | Report | Bruun 23'; Røge 76'; Jørgensen 84' | Stadium: Eerikkilä Arena; Referee: Lehtovaara Vili (Finland) |

===== 2025 UEFA Women's U-16 Development Tournament =====
| 23 April 2025 | Denmark | 6–1 | Scotland | Port Talbot, Wales |
| 10:00 UTC | Bischoff 18'; Sea 33'; Nielsen 46', 50', 70'; Thygesen 83' | Report | | Stadium: Macron Ynys Park |

| 25 April 2025 | Denmark | 1–1 | Wales | Port Talbot, Wales |
| 14:00 UTC | Bischoff 69' | Report | Clark 86' | Stadium: Macron Ynys Park |

| 28 April 2025 | Norway | 0–3 | Denmark | Port Talbot, Wales |
| 10:00 UTC | | Report | Nielsen 21', 31'; Engsig-Karup 62' | Stadium: Macron Ynys Park |
