= 2025 Maurice Revello Tournament =

51ème Festival International "Espoirs" – Tournoi Maurice Revello (in French)

Tournament details
- Host country: France
- Dates: 3–15 June 2025
- Teams: 8 (from 4 confederations)
- Venue: 6 (in 6 host cities)

Final positions
- Champions: France (14th title)
- Runners-up: Saudi Arabia
- Third place: Denmark
- Fourth place: Mexico

Tournament statistics
- Matches played: 18
- Goals scored: 63 (3.5 per match)
- Top scorer: (France) Steve Ngoura (5 goals)
- Best player: (France) Steve Ngoura
- Best goalkeeper: (Saudi Arabia) Osama Al-Mermesh

The 2025 Maurice Revello Tournament (officially French: 51ème Festival International "Espoirs" – Tournoi Maurice Revello), was the 51st edition of the Maurice Revello Tournament, an annual, international, age-restricted football tournament. The last champions Ukraine would not be invited to the 2025 tournament.

France won their 14th title after defeating Saudi Arabia 3–1 in the final. Saudi Arabia became the third Asian team to be in a final of a Maurice Revello Tournament, with the first being China in the 2007 Toulon Tournament, and the second being Japan in the 2019 Toulon Tournament, where they both finished as runners-up.

== Participants ==
Eight participating teams were announced on 13 May 2025.

AFC

- Saudi Arabia
- Japan

CAF

- Mali
- Congo

CONCACAF

- Mexico
- Panama

UEFA

- France
- Denmark

== Venues ==
A total of six cities hosted the tournament.

2025 Maurice Revello Tournament is located in Provence-Alpes-Côte d'Azur
Arles	Aubagne	Fos-sur-Mer
Stade Fernand-Fournier	Stade de Lattre-de-Tassigny	Stade Parsemain
43.669625°N 4.631786°E	43.2939695°N 5.5623227°E	43.4687854°N 4.9489821°E
Capacity: 2,500	Capacity: 1,000	Capacity: 12,500
Mallemort	Salon-de-Provence	Vitrolles
Stade d'Honneur	Stade d'Honneur Marcel Roustan	Stade Jules-Ladoumègue
43.7241096°N 5.1774767°E	43.6356163°N 5.0928964°E	43.4578485°N 5.2433091°E
Capacity: 720	Capacity: 4,000	Capacity: 1,500

== Match officials ==
The match officials were announced on the tournament's website.

=== Referees ===
AFC

- (Saudi Arabia) Khaled Al-Ahmari
- (Japan) Yusuke Ohashi

UEFA

- (Albania) Emanuela Rusta
- (Albania) Ermis Çelaj
- (Austria) Sara Telek
- (France) Alexandra Collin
- (Malta) Joseph Scerri

== Group stage ==
The eight teams were drawn into two groups of four.

=== Group A ===
Pos	Team	Pld	W	OTW	OTL	L	GF	GA	GD	Pts	Qualification
1	France (H)	3	2	0	1	0	5	3	+2	7	Advance to knockout stage
2	Saudi Arabia	3	1	0	1	1	5	5	0	4	Advance to knockout stage
3	Mali	3	0	2	0	1	4	5	−1	4	Advance to fifth place playoff
4	Panama	3	1	0	0	2	4	5	−1	3	Advance to seventh place playoff

Source: Maurice Revello Tournament
(H) Host

All times are local CEST

3 June 2025
14:00

Mali	1–2	Panama
Samaké 89'	Report	Herrera 21' (pen.); Cuello 46'

Stade Parsemain, Fos-sur-Mer
Referee: Ermis Çelaj (Albania)
3 June 2025
17:30

France	2–1	Saudi Arabia
Ngoura 62' (pen.); Zidane 68'	Report	Radif 22'

Stade Parsemain, Fos-sur-Mer
Referee: Yusuke Ohashi (Japan)

6 June 2025
14:00

Panama	1–2	Saudi Arabia
Castillo 43'	Report	Al-Othman 35'; Radif 58'

Parc des Sports, Avignon
Referee: Emanuela Rusta (Albania)
6 June 2025
17:30

France	1–1	Mali
T. Gomis 38'	Report	Diakité 17'
Penalties
Ngoura (penalty scored); Tabibou (penalty scored); Benama (penalty scored); Bouabré (penalty missed); Baseya (penalty scored); Koné (penalty missed)	4–5	(penalty scored) Sinaté; (penalty scored) Tia; (penalty scored) Niakaté; (penalty scored) Barry; (penalty missed) Koné; (penalty scored) Doucouré

Parc des Sports, Avignon
Referee: Joseph Scerri (Malta)

9 June 2025
14:00

Saudi Arabia	2–2	Mali
Al-Alaeli 15'; Radif 66'	Report	Diakité 45+2'; Samaké 49'
Penalties
Al-Abdulwahed (penalty scored); Abdullah (penalty scored); Al-Ghamdi (penalty scored); Al-Asiri (penalty scored); Al-Omair (penalty scored); Al-Zaid (penalty missed)	5–6	(penalty scored) Sinaté; (penalty scored) F. Doumbia; (penalty scored) Niakaté; (penalty scored) Barry; (penalty scored) Diakité; (penalty scored) Soukouna

Stade de Lattre-de-Tassigny, Aubagne
Referee: Sara Telek (Austria)
9 June 2025
17:30

Panama	1–2	France
Herrera 34'	Report	Ngoura 16'; Michal 36'

Stade de Lattre-de-Tassigny, Aubagne
Referee: Yusuke Ohashi (Japan)

=== Group B ===
Pos	Team	Pld	W	OTW	OTL	L	GF	GA	GD	Pts	Qualification
1	Denmark	3	2	1	0	0	8	3	+5	8	Advance to knockout stage
2	Mexico	3	0	1	2	0	7	7	0	4	Advance to knockout stage
3	Japan	3	1	0	1	1	3	4	−1	4	Advance to fifth place playoff
4	Congo	3	0	1	0	2	3	7	−4	2	Advance to seventh place playoff

Source: Maurice Revello Tournament

All times are local CEST

4 June 2025
14:00

Congo	0–2	Japan
	Report	Kanda 56', 58'

Stade Parsemain, Fos-sur-Mer
Referee: Khaled Al-Ahmari (Saudi Arabia)
4 June 2025
17:30

Mexico	3–3	Denmark
Virgen 45+2'; Uribe 83'; Jiménez 90+7'	Report	Vester 11'; Rohd 69', 90+4'
Penalties
Jurado (penalty scored); Carrillo (penalty scored); Jiménez (penalty scored); Padilla (penalty scored); Uribe (penalty missed)	4–5	(penalty scored) Enggård; (penalty scored) Nielsen; (penalty scored) Beck; (penalty scored) Opoku; (penalty scored) Rohd

Stade Parsemain, Fos-sur-Mer
Referee: Ermis Çelaj (Albania)

7 June 2025
14:00

Japan	1–1	Mexico
Nishihara 32'	Report	Camberos 71'
Penalties
Michiwaki (penalty missed); Ozeki (penalty scored); Hiraga (penalty missed); Ishiwatari (penalty scored); Ichihara (penalty scored)	3–4	(penalty scored) Padilla; (penalty scored) Jurado; (penalty missed) Virgen; (penalty scored) Jiménez; (penalty scored) Camberos

Parc des Sports, Avignon
Referee: Alexandra Collin (France)
7 June 2025
17:30

Denmark	2–0	Congo
Enggård 27' (pen.); Obi 90+5'	Report

Parc des Sports, Avignon
Referee: Khaled Al-Ahmari (Saudi Arabia)

10 June 2025
14:00

Denmark	3–0	Japan
Obi 5'; Nakamura 78' (o.g.); Simmelhack 85'	Report

Stade de Lattre-de-Tassigny, Aubagne
Referee: Alexandra Collin (France)
10 June 2025
17:30

Mexico	3–3	Congo
Virgen 21'; Jiménez 30'; Moreno 61'	Report	Fougeu 25'; Nyindong Tsamouna 89' (pen.); Bemba 90+4'
Penalties
Jiménez (penalty scored); Jurado (penalty scored); D. Ochoa (penalty scored); Rico (penalty missed)	3–5	(penalty scored) Mantsounga; (penalty scored) Mazikou; (penalty scored) Dziki Loussilaho; (penalty scored) Nyindong Tsamouna; (penalty scored) Tchicamboud

Stade de Lattre-de-Tassigny, Aubagne
Referee: Joseph Scerri (Malta)

== Classification matches ==
The teams that failed to reach the knock-out stage will play an additional game to determine their final ranking in the competition.

All times were local CEST

=== Seventh place playoff ===
13 June 2025
12:00

Panama	0–1	Congo
		Le Bret 37' (pen.)

Stade Fernand-Fournier, Arles
Referee: Yusuke Ohashi (Japan)

=== Fifth place playoff ===
14 June 2025
17:00

Mali	3–2	Japan
Sidibé 11'; Thiero 31'; Makalou 60'		Mori 51'; Ishii 86'

Stade du Moulin, Noves
Referee: Khaled Al-Ahmari (Saudi Arabia)

== Knockout stage ==
Semi-finals
13 June – Salon-de-Provence
France	3
Mexico	1
13 June – Salon-de-Provence
Denmark	3
Saudi Arabia	4

Final
15 June – Salon-de-Provence
France	3
Saudi Arabia	1
Third place
15 June – Salon-de-Provence
Denmark	2
Mexico	1

All times are local CEST

=== Semi-finals ===
13 June 2025
14:00

Denmark	3–4	Saudi Arabia
Christensen 20'; Beck 64'; Lyng 90+3' (pen.)	Report	Al-Jaber 4', 53'; Radif 11'; Al-Alaeli 45'

Stade d'Honneur Marcel Roustan, Salon-de-Provence
Referee: Ermis Çelaj (Albania)

13 June 2025
17:30

France	3–1	Mexico
Leroux 14'; Ngoura 67'; Tabibou 89'	Report	Mendoza 48'

Stade d'Honneur Marcel Roustan, Salon-de-Provence
Referee: Sara Telek (Austria)

=== Third place playoff ===
15 June 2025
14:30

Denmark	2–1	Mexico
Lyng 40'; Parra 83' (o.g.)	Report	Sánchez 44'

Stade d'Honneur Marcel Roustan, Salon-de-Provence
Referee: Alexandra Collin (France)

=== Final ===
15 June 2025
18:00

France	3–1	Saudi Arabia
Tabibou 2'; Ngoura 44' (pen.), 58' (pen.)	Report	Abdulrahman 90+2'

Stade d'Honneur Marcel Roustan, Salon-de-Provence
Referee: Emanuela Rusta (Albania)

== Statistics ==
=== Goalscorers ===
There were 63 goals scored in 18 matches, for an average of 3.5 goals per match.

5 goals

- (France) Steve Ngoura

4 goals

- (Saudi Arabia) Abdullah Radif

2 goals

- (Denmark) Alexander Lyng
- (Denmark) Chido Obi
- (Denmark) Emil Rohd
- (France) Dehmaine Tabibou
- (Japan) Soma Kanda
- (Mali) Gaoussou Diakité
- (Mali) Wilson Samaké
- (Mexico) Tahiel Jiménez
- (Mexico) Oswaldo Virgen
- (Panama) Gustavo Herrera
- (Saudi Arabia) Mishal Al-Alaeli
- (Saudi Arabia) Abdulmalik Al-Jaber

1 goal

- (Republic of the Congo) Jason Bemba
- (Republic of the Congo) Breyton Fougeu
- (Republic of the Congo) Noah Le Bret
- (Republic of the Congo) Jean Nyindong Tsamouna
- (Denmark) Julius Beck
- (Denmark) Gustav Christensen
- (Denmark) Mads Enggård
- (Denmark) Alexander Simmelhack
- (Denmark) Jakob Vester
- (France) Tidiam Gomis
- (France) Louis Leroux
- (France) Lucas Michal
- (France) Elyaz Zidane
- (Japan) Hisatsugu Ishii
- (Japan) Soichiro Mori
- (Japan) Motoki Nishihara
- (Mali) Hamidou Makalou
- (Mali) Aboubakar Sidibé
- (Mali) Ousmane Thiero
- (Mexico) Hugo Camberos
- (Mexico) Jaziel Mendoza
- (Mexico) Omar Moreno
- (Mexico) Diego Sánchez
- (Mexico) Juan Pablo Uribe
- (Panama) Oldemar Castillo
- (Panama) Raheen Cuello
- (Saudi Arabia) Mohammed Abdulrahman
- (Saudi Arabia) Abdulaziz Al-Othman

1 own goal

- (Japan) Keisuke Nakamura (against Denmark)
- (Mexico) Bernardo Parra (against Denmark)

== See also ==
- 2025 Sud Ladies Cup
