= Oumar Pona =

Malian footballer (born 2006)

Personal information
- Full name: Oumar Kalifa Pona
- Date of birth: 21 June 2006 (age 20)
- Place of birth: Bondy, France
- Height: 1.89 m (6 ft 2 in)
- Position: Goalkeeper

Team information
- Current team: Angers
- Number: 40

Youth career
- 2017–2018: Croix Blanche Angers
- 2018–2023: Angers

Senior career*
Years	Team	Apps	(Gls)
2023–	Angers II	40	(0)
2025–	Angers	2	(0)

International career^{‡}
2024	France U19	1	(0)
2025	Mali U23	2	(0)
- * Club domestic league appearances and goals as of 20 May 2026 ‡ National team caps and goals as of 13:52, 15 April 2026 (UTC)

Oumar Kalifa Pona (born 21 June 2006) is a professional footballer who plays as a goalkeeper for Ligue 1 club Angers. Born in France, he is a youth international for Mali.

== Club career ==
Pona is a product of the youth academies of the French clubs Croix Blanche Angers and Angers. He first played for Angers' reserves in 2023, and on 7 March 2024 signed his first professional contract with the club unti 2027. He made his senior and professional debut with Angers in a 0–0 (6–5) penalty shootout win in the Coupe de France against Les Herbiers VF on 19 December 2025.

== International career ==
Born in France, Pona is of Malian and Guinean descent and holds dual-citizenship. He was called up to the France U19s for a set of friendlies in October 2024. He was part of the Mali U23s for the 2025 Maurice Revello Tournament.

== Career statistics ==
=== Club ===
As of match played 20 March 2026

Appearances and goals by club, season and competition
Club	Season	League			National cup		Total	
Club	Season	Division	Apps	Goals	Apps	Goals	Apps	Goals
Angers B	2022–23	Championnat National 2	1	0	—		1	0
Angers B	2023–24	Championnat National 2	10	0	—		10	0
Angers B	2024–25	Championnat National 3	18	0	—		18	0
Angers B	2025–26	Championnat National 3	11	0	—		11	0
Angers B	Total		40	0	—		40	0
Angers	2023–24	Ligue 2	0	0	0	0	0	0
Angers	2025–26	Ligue 1	2	0	2	0	4	0
Angers	2026–27	Ligue 1	0	0	0	0	0	0
Angers	Total		2	0	2	0	4	0
Career total			42	0	2	0	44	0
