= Jaziel Mendoza =

Mexican footballer (born 2005)

Personal information
- Full name: Karol Jaziel Velázquez Mendoza
- Date of birth: 20 May 2005 (age 21)
- Place of birth: Culiacán, Sinaloa, Mexico
- Height: 1.77 m (5 ft 10 in)
- Position: Midfielder

Team information
- Current team: Cruz Azul Hidalgo
- Number: 67

Youth career
- 2019–2020: Zacatecas
- 2021–: Cruz Azul

Senior career*
Years	Team	Apps	(Gls)
2025–	Cruz Azul	2	(0)
2026–	Cruz Azul Hidalgo	7	(0)

International career^{‡}
2025–	Mexico U20	4	(1)
Medal record
Men's football
Representing Mexico
Central American and Caribbean Games
Silver medal – second place	2026 Santo Domingo
- * Club domestic league appearances and goals as of 31 October 2026 ‡ National team caps and goals as of 7 October 2025

Karol Jaziel Velázquez Mendoza (born 20 May 2005) is a Mexican professional footballer who plays as a midfielder for Liga de Expansión MX club Cruz Azul Hidalgo.

== Youth career ==
Mendoza began his career in 2019 with the third-division team of Mineros de Zacatecas leaving the club in 2020. In June 2021, he was recruited by Cruz Azul's youth academy, where he progressed through the U-17, U-18, and U-23 teams.

== Club career ==
Mendoza made his senior debut for Cruz Azul on 11 February 2025 in the CONCACAF Champions Cup against Haitian side Real Hope FA. He was part of the squad that went on to win the tournament. On 16 August 2025, Mendoza made his Liga MX debut, starting in a match against Santos Laguna.

== International career ==
In 2025, Mendoza was called up by coach Eduardo Arce to represent Mexico at the Maurice Revello Tournament and was subsequently selected for the squad for the FIFA U-20 World Cup held in Chile.

== Career statistics ==
=== Club ===
As of match played on 31 October 2026

Appearances and goals by club, season and competition
Club	Season	League			National cup		Continental (Note: Includes CONCACAF Champions Cup)		Other		Total	
Club	Season	Division	Apps	Goals	Apps	Goals	Apps	Goals	Apps	Goals	Apps	Goals
Cruz Azul	2024–25	Liga MX	—		—		1	0	—		1	0
Cruz Azul	2025–26	Liga MX	2	0	—		1	0	—		3	0
Cruz Azul	Total		2	0	—		2	0	—		4	0
Cruz Azul Hidalgo	2026–27	Liga de Expansión MX	7	0	—		—		—		7	0
Career total			9	0	0	0	2	0	0	0	11	0

=== International ===
As of match played on 7 October 2025

Appearances and goals by national team, year and competition
Team	Year	Competitive		Friendly		Total	
Team	Year	Apps	Goals	Apps	Goals	Apps	Goals
Mexico U20	2025	4 (Note: Three appearances and one goal in the 2025 Maurice Revello Tournament, one appearance in the 2025 FIFA U-20 World Cup.)	1	—		4	1
Mexico U20	Total	4	1	0	0	4	1
Career total		4	1	0	0	4	1

== Honours ==
Cruz Azul

- Liga MX: Clausura 2026
- CONCACAF Champions Cup: 2025
