= Bernardo Parra =

Mexican footballer (born 2005)

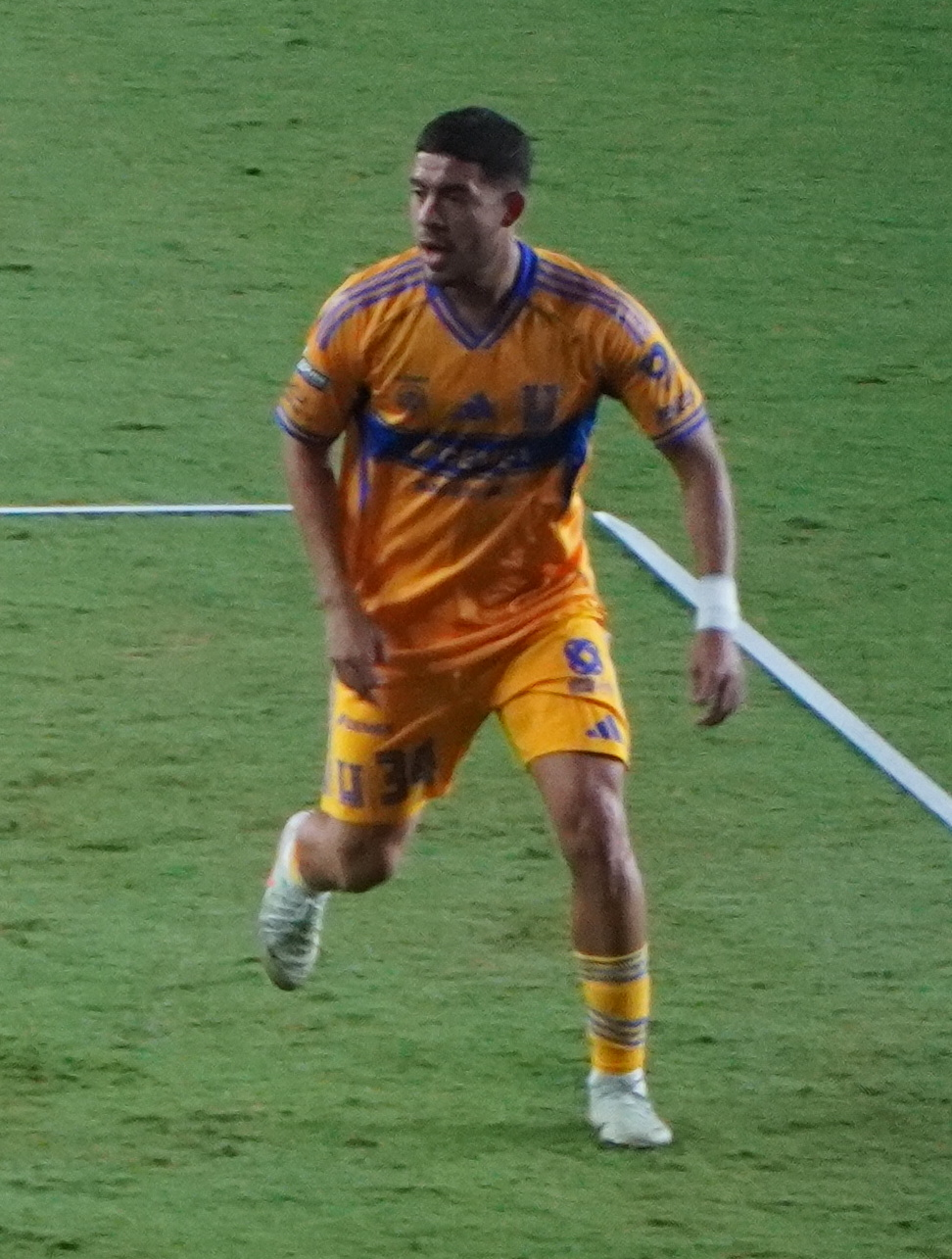
- Parra with UANL in 2025

Personal information
- Full name: Bernardo Emmanuel Parra Camacho
- Date of birth: 6 January 2005 (age 21)
- Place of birth: Tepic, Nayarit, Mexico
- Height: 1.77 m (5 ft 10 in)
- Position: Defensive midfielder

Team information
- Current team: Querétaro
- Number: 8

Youth career
- 2019–2025: UANL

Senior career*
Years	Team	Apps	(Gls)
2025–2026	UANL	20	(0)
2026–	Querétaro	22	(0)

International career^{‡}
2025	Mexico U20	4	(0)
Medal record
Men's football
Representing Mexico
Central American and Caribbean Games
Silver medal – second place	2026 Santo Domingo
- * Club domestic league appearances and goals as of 30 October 2026 ‡ National team caps and goals as of 25 October 2025

Bernardo Emmanuel Parra Camacho (born 6 January 2005) is a Mexican professional footballer who plays as a defensive midfielder for Liga MX club Querétaro.

== Club career ==
=== UANL ===
Parra began his career at the academy of UANL, progressing through all categories, until making his professional debut on 11 January 2025, being subbed in at the 89th minute of a 3–1 win against Atlético San Luis.

== Career statistics ==
=== Club ===
As of match played on 30 October 2026

Club	Season	League			Cup		Continental		Other		Total	
Club	Season	Division	Apps	Goals	Apps	Goals	Apps	Goals	Apps	Goals	Apps	Goals
UANL	2024–25	Liga MX	10	0	—		4 (Note: Appearances in CONCACAF Champions Cup)	0	—		14	0
UANL	2025–26	Liga MX	10	0	—		—		—		10	0
UANL	Total		20	0	—		4	0	—		24	0
Querétaro	2025–26	Liga MX	12	0	—		—		—		12	0
Querétaro	2026–27	Liga MX	10	0	—		—		1 (Note: Appearances in Leagues Cup)	0	11	0
Querétaro	Total		22	0	—		—		1	0	23	0
Career total			33	0	0	0	4	0	1	0	38	0

== International career ==
In 2025, Parra was called up by coach Eduardo Arce to represent Mexico at the 2025 Maurice Revello Tournament.
