= Dan Sinaté =

Footballer (born 2006)

Personal information
- Date of birth: 9 June 2006 (age 20)
- Place of birth: Chambray-lès-Tours, France
- Height: 1.81 m (5 ft 11 in)
- Position: Left-back

Team information
- Current team: Amiens (on loan from Angers)

Youth career
- 2011–2017: ES Genillé
- 2017–2018: Amboise
- 2018–2021: EB Saint-Cyr-sur-Loire
- 2021–2024: Monaco
- 2024–2025: Alavés
- 2025: Angers

Senior career*
Years	Team	Apps	(Gls)
2025–	Angers B	24	(0)
2025–	Angers	3	(0)
2026–	→ Amiens (loan)	0	(0)

International career^{‡}
2021–2022	France U16	8	(0)
2023	France U17	1	(0)
2025–	Mali U23	5	(0)
- * Club domestic league appearances and goals as of 20 May 2026 ‡ National team caps and goals as of 04:49, 26 March 2026 (UTC)

Dan Sinaté (born 9 June 2006) is a professional footballer who plays as a left-back for Ligue 3 club Amiens on loan from Ligue 1 club Angers. Born in France, he represents Mali at youth international level.

== Club career ==
Sinaté was part of the Monaco under-18 squad that won the Coupe Gambardella in 2023. On 22 February 2024, he signed his first professional contract with Monaco. He joined Spanish club Alavés in the summer of 2024 before signing for Angers on an amateur contract in January 2025. After playing for both the under-19s and reserves, he signed a professional contract with Angers in May 2025. Having made his senior debut in a Coupe de France match against Les Herbiers in December 2025, where he converted his penalty in a shoot-out victory, Sinaté made his first Ligue 1 appearance in a 2–0 defeat to Nice on 14 March 2026.

== International career ==
Sinaté represented France at under-16 and under-17 level. He later switched his allegiance to Mali, representing the country with the under-23s at the 2025 Maurice Revello Tournament.

== Personal life ==
Born in France, Sinaté is of Malian descent on his father's side.

== Honours ==
Monaco U18

- Coupe Gambardella: 2023
