= Silas Bjerre =

Danish footballer (born 2005)

Personal information
- Full name: Silas Bjerre Henriksen
- Date of birth: 18 February 2005 (age 21)
- Place of birth: Greve Strand, Denmark
- Height: 1.87 m (6 ft 2 in)
- Position: Goalkeeper

Team information
- Current team: Torreense
- Number: 44

Youth career
- –2021: Copenhagen
- 2021–2022: Nordsjælland
- 2022–2024: Marítimo

Senior career*
Years	Team	Apps	(Gls)
2024–	Torreense	2	(0)
- * Club domestic league appearances and goals as of 13:46, 9 February 2025 (UTC)

Silas Bjerre Henriksen (born 18 February 2005) is a Danish professional footballer who plays as a goalkeeper for Liga Portugal 2 club Torreense.

== Career ==
=== Club career ===
Silas Bjerre started his career in F.C. Copenhagen's academy, but moved to FC Nordsjælland in 2021. The following year he moved from Nordsjælland's U17 squad to Portuguese side Marítimo. Here he played for two years, where he trained a lot with the club's B-team and first team, but only played for the club's U19 team.

In July 2024 Bjerre moved to Liga Portugal 2 club Torreense on a contract until June 2027. Bjerre would be part of both the first team and the club's U23 team. According to Bjerre, he was also chased by several other clubs, but the choice fell on Torreense.

During the fall of 2024, Bjerre was the goalkeeper with the most clean sheets in the Portuguese U23 league, Liga Revelação, which made English club Brentford keep a close eye on him, according to media reports.

On 22 December 2024, Bjerre made his unexpected debut for Torreense in the Liga Portugal 2 against F.C. Penafiel. With regular first choice Lucas Paes injured, second choice Leandro Matheus played. However, the latter was sent off in the 97th minute, which meant that Bjerre was substituted for the final minutes. Due to the injury and suspension in that match, Bjerre also started in the following match against C.D. Mafra, where he became Torreense's hero when he saved a penalty kick to secure a 1–0 victory.
