= Omar Moreno (footballer) =

Mexican footballer (born 2005)

Personal information
- Full name: Omar Fernando Moreno Villegas
- Date of birth: 30 January 2005 (age 21)
- Place of birth: Hermosillo, Sonora, Mexico
- Height: 1.80 m (5 ft 11 in)
- Position: Attacking midfielder

Team information
- Current team: Puebla
- Number: 8

Youth career
- 2021–2025: Mazatlán

Senior career*
Years	Team	Apps	(Gls)
2023–2026	Mazatlán	39	(3)
2026–	Puebla	13	(3)

International career^{‡}
2023	Mexico U19	1	(1)
2025	Mexico U20	5	(1)
- * Club domestic league appearances and goals as of 20 November 2026 ‡ National team caps and goals as of 2 June 2026

Omar Fernando Moreno Villegas (born 30 January 2005) is a Mexican professional footballer who plays as an attacking midfielder for Liga MX club Puebla.

== Club career ==
Moreno began his career at the academy of Mazatlán, logging over 3,400 minutes with the youth teams, before making his debut on 12 January 2023 in a 1–2 loss to Atlas, being subbed in at the 79th minute.

On 29 May 2026, Moreno signed with Puebla.

== Career statistics ==
=== Club ===
As of match played on 20 November 2026

Appearances and goals by club, season and competition
Club	Season	League			Cup		Continental		Club World Cup		Other		Total	
Club	Season	Division	Apps	Goals	Apps	Goals	Apps	Goals	Apps	Goals	Apps	Goals	Apps	Goals
Mazatlán	2022–23	Liga MX	8	0	1 (Note: Appearance in Copa Sky por México)	0	—		—		—		9	0
Mazatlán	2023–24	Liga MX	4	0	—		—		—		—		4	0
Mazatlán	2024–25	Liga MX	12	2	—		—		—		1 (Note: Appearances in Leagues Cup)	0	13	2
Mazatlán	2025–26	Liga MX	15	1	—		—		—		1	0	16	1
Mazatlán	Total		39	3	1	0	0	0	0	0	2	0	42	3
Puebla	2026–27	Liga MX	13	3	—		—		—		3	0	16	3
Career total			52	6	1	0	0	0	0	0	5	0	58	6

== International career ==
In 2025, Moreno was called up by coach Eduardo Arce to represent Mexico at the 2025 Maurice Revello Tournament.
