= Sara Telek =

Austrian football referee

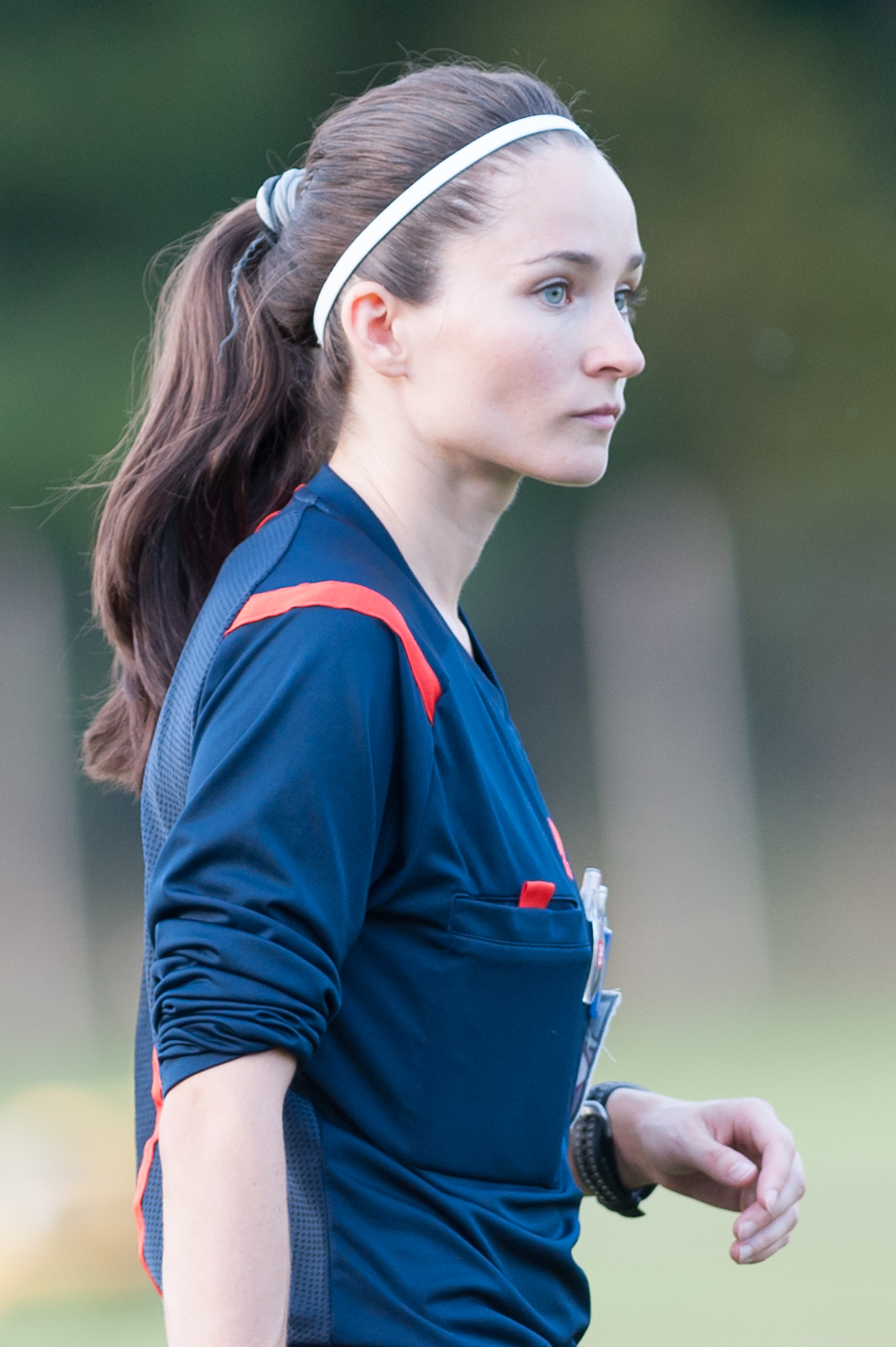
- Born: 8 August 1988 (age 38); Vienna, Austria

Domestic
Years	League	Role

International
Years	League	Role

Sara Telek (born 8 August 1988) is an Austrian football referee. Telek been a referee of the Women Frauen-Bundesliga since 2013. She was selected to become a referee at UEFA Women's Euro 2022.
