= Brad Mantsounga =

Congolese footballer (born 2007)

Personal information
- Full name: Brad-Hamilton Mantsounga Makouangou
- Date of birth: 6 September 2007 (age 19)
- Place of birth: Nice, France
- Height: 1.83 m (6 ft 0 in)
- Position: Centre-back

Team information
- Current team: Virton (on loan from Nice)
- Number: 2

Youth career
- Cavigal Nice
- 2020–2026: Nice

Senior career*
Years	Team	Apps	(Gls)
2024–	Nice II	22	(1)
2025–	Nice	1	(0)
2026–	→ Virton (loan)	0	(0)

International career^{‡}
2023	Congo U17	4	(0)
2025	Congo U20	2	(0)
- * Club domestic league appearances and goals as of 30 August 2026 ‡ National team caps and goals as of 21:10, 29 January 2026 (UTC)

Brad-Hamilton Mantsounga Makouangou (born 6 September 2007) is a professional footballer who plays as a centre-back for Challenger Pro League club Virton in Belgium on loan from Nice. Born in France, he represents Congo internationally.

== Career ==
Mantsounga is a product of the youth academies of the French clubs Cavigal Nice and Nice. He was promoted to Nice's reserves for the 2024–25 season, and on 25 September 2025, he signed a stagiary contract the club until 2027. On 11 January 2026, he debuted with the senior Nice team in a 1–1 (4–6) Coupe de France win over Nantes.

On 3 September 2026, Mantsounga was loaned to Virton in the Belgian second tier for the season.

== International career ==
Mantsounga was born in France to a Congolese father and Gabonese mother. He was called up to the Congo U17s for the 2023 U-17 Africa Cup of Nations. He was called up to the Congo U20s for the 2025 Maurice Revello Tournament.

== Career statistics ==
As of match played 4 February 2026

Appearances and goals by club, season and competition
Club	Season	League			Cup		Europe		Other		Total	
Club	Season	Division	Apps	Goals	Apps	Goals	Apps	Goals	Apps	Goals	Apps	Goals
Nice II	2024–25	Championnat National 3	22	1	—		—		—		22	1
Nice	2025–26	Ligue 1	1	0	1	0	2 (Note: Appearances in UEFA Europa League)	0	—		4	0
Career total			23	1	1	0	2	0	0	0	26	1
