= Dehmaine Tabibou =

French footballer (born 2005)

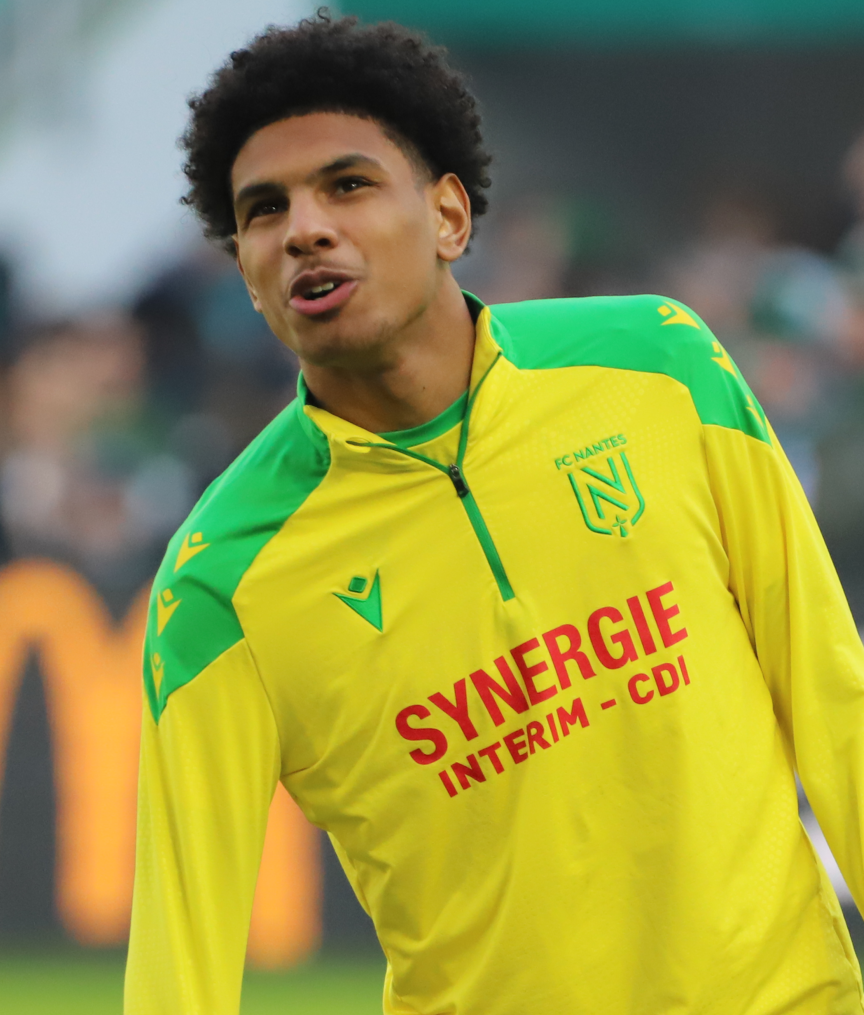
- Assoumani with Nantes in 2025

Personal information
- Full name: Dehmaine Tabibou Assoumani
- Date of birth: 17 April 2005 (age 21)
- Place of birth: Drancy, France
- Height: 1.81 m (5 ft 11 in)
- Position: Midfielder

Team information
- Current team: Nantes
- Number: 17

Youth career
- 2010–2015: Bourget FC
- 2015–2019: Blanc-Mesnil SF
- 2019–2020: Sarcelles AAS
- 2020–2024: Nantes

Senior career*
Years	Team	Apps	(Gls)
2023–	Nantes II	22	(2)
2024–	Nantes	38	(1)

International career^{‡}
2022–2023	France U18	7	(0)
2023–2024	France U19	18	(1)
2024–2025	France U20	10	(4)
2026–	France U21	2	(0)
Medal record
Men's football
Representing France
UEFA European Under-19 Championship
Runner-up	2024 Northern Ireland
- * Club domestic league appearances and goals as of 19:12, 26 April 2026 (UTC) ‡ National team caps and goals as of 23:28, 30 March 2026

Dehmaine Tabibou Assoumani (born 17 April 2005) is a French professional footballer who plays as a midfielder for Nantes.

== Club career ==
Tabibou is a youth product of Bourget FC, Blanc-Mesnil SF and Sarcelles AAS, before moving to Nantes's academy in 2020 finish his development. On 22 October 2022, he signed his first professional contract with Nantes until 2025. In 2023 he was promoted to Nantes' reserves, and he started training with their senior side in 2024. He made his senior and professional debut with Nantes as a substitute in a 2–1 Ligue 1 loss to Reims on 15 September 2024.

== International career ==
Born in France, Tabibou was born to a Comorian father and Algerian mother. He was part of the France U19s that made the finals at the 2024 UEFA European Under-19 Championship.

== Career statistics ==
As of match played 26 April 2026

Appearances and goals by club, season and competition
Club	Season	League			Cup		Europe		Other		Total	
Club	Season	Division	Apps	Goals	Apps	Goals	Apps	Goals	Apps	Goals	Apps	Goals
Nantes B	2022–23	Championnat National 2	3	0	—		—		—		3	0
Nantes B	2023–24	Championnat National 3	13	0	—		—		—		13	0
Nantes B	2024–25	Championnat National 3	6	2	—		—		—		6	2
Nantes B	2025–26	Championnat National 3	0	0	—		—		—		0	0
Nantes B	Total		22	2	—		—		—		22	2
Nantes	2024–25	Ligue 1	12	0	1	0	—		—		13	0
Nantes	2025–26	Ligue 1	26	1	2	0	—		—		28	1
Nantes	Total		38	1	3	0	—		—		41	1
Career total			60	3	3	0	0	0	0	0	63	3

== Honours ==
Nantes U19

- Championnat National U19: 2022–23

France U19

- UEFA European Under-19 Championship runner-up: 2024

France U20

- Maurice Revello Tournament: 2025
