= Tahiel Jiménez =

Mexican footballer

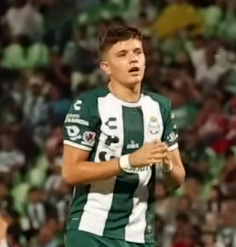
- Jiménez with Santos Laguna in 2024

Personal information
- Full name: Tahiel Adrián Jiménez Sánchez
- Date of birth: 22 January 2006 (age 20)
- Place of birth: Boca del Río, Veracruz, Mexico
- Height: 1.80 m (5 ft 11 in)
- Position: Striker

Team information
- Current team: Santos Laguna
- Number: 29

Youth career
- –2019: Querétaro
- 2022–: Santos Laguna

Senior career*
Years	Team	Apps	(Gls)
2024–	Santos Laguna	45	(7)

International career^{‡}
2023	Mexico U17	4	(1)
2024–	Mexico U20	20	(6)
Medal record
Men's football
Representing Mexico
Central American and Caribbean Games
Silver medal – second place	2026 Santo Domingo
- * Club domestic league appearances and goals as of 21 November 2026 ‡ National team caps and goals as of 11 October 2025

Tahiel Adrián Jiménez Sánchez (born 22 January 2006) is a Mexican professional footballer who plays as a striker for Liga MX club Santos Laguna and the Mexico national under-20 team.

== Club career ==
=== Early career ===
Jiménez was born on 22 January 2006 in Boca del Río, Veracruz, Mexico, as his father Walter Jiménez was playing for C.D. Veracruz at the time.

Jiménez joined the academy of Querétaro, where he played for their under-13s up until the summer of 2019. In 2022, he joined the academy of his father's former team, Santos Laguna. Jiménez progressed through the youth ranks of Santos Laguna during the clausura tournament, progressing from the under-16 to the under-19 teams prior to his debut.

=== Santos Laguna ===
On 12 April 2024, Jiménez made his professional debut for Santos Laguna after entering the pitch in the 75th minute for Stephano Carrillo in a 2–0 defeat to Necaxa.

Throughout the 2024–25 Liga MX season, Jiménez had made subsequent appearances for the club following the departures of Stephano Carillo and José Juan Macías from the club. On 1 September, Jiménez scored his first goal for Los Guerreros, a late-stoppage time winner over Necaxa to win 3–2.

== International career ==
As a youth international, Jiménez is eligible to represent both Mexico, his country of birth, and Argentina through his father.

In October 2023, Jiménez was called up for the 2023 FIFA U-17 World Cup in Indonesia. In Mexico's opening match of the tournament, Jiménez scored their only goal in a 3–1 loss to eventual champions Germany. He went on to appear in the rest of the games as Mexico were eliminated by Mali in the Round of 16.

In August 2024, Jiménez was called up to the Mexico under-20 squad for the first time. On 5 September, he made his debut, starting in a 2–1 defeat to Brazil. In the following game, on 8 September, Jiménez scored his first goal in a 3–2 defeat to Brazil.

On 20 June 2025, Jiménez was called up by Eduardo Arce for the 2025 Maurice Revello Tournament in France. In Mexico's opening match against Denmark, Jiménez scored a 97th-minute equalizer to send the game into penalties following a 3–3 draw, though his side ultimately lost 5–4. In the next game, Jiménez converted his penalty in the shoot-out against Japan, securing a 4–3 win. In the final group stage match, Jiménez scored against the Congo, and also converted his penalty in the shoot-out following a dramatic 3–3 draw. Mexico went on to finish fourth in the tournament following a 2–1 loss to Denmark in the third-place playoff.

On 10 September, Jiménez was called up for the 2025 FIFA U-20 World Cup in Chile, scoring against the host nation in a 4–1 win.

== Career statistics ==
As of match played on 21 November 2026

Club	Season	League			Cup		Continental		Other		Total	
Club	Season	Division	Apps	Goals	Apps	Goals	Apps	Goals	Apps	Goals	Apps	Goals
Santos Laguna	2023–24	Liga MX	2	0	—		—		—		2	0
Santos Laguna	2024–25	Liga MX	23	1	—		—		—		23	1
Santos Laguna	2025–26	Liga MX	12	0	—		—		—		12	0
Santos Laguna	2026–27	Liga MX	8	6	—		—		—		8	6
Career total			45	7	0	0	0	0	0	0	45	7
