= Lauge Sandgrav =

Danish footballer (born 2004)

Personal information
- Full name: Lauge Wesenberg Sandgrav
- Date of birth: 16 September 2004 (age 22)
- Place of birth: Virum, Denmark
- Height: 1.84 m (6 ft 0 in)
- Position: Midfielder

Team information
- Current team: Lyngby
- Number: 14

Youth career
- Virum-Sorgenfri BK
- Lyngby

Senior career*
Years	Team	Apps	(Gls)
2020–	Lyngby	66	(3)

International career^{‡}
2019–2020	Denmark U16	7	(1)
2020	Denmark U17	1	(0)
2021	Denmark U18	2	(0)
2022	Denmark U19	2	(0)
2023–	Denmark U20	3	(1)
- * Club domestic league appearances and goals as of 2 June 2026 ‡ National team caps and goals as of 16:00, 4 January 2025 (UTC)

Lauge Wesenberg Sandgrav (born 16 September 2004) is a Danish professional footballer who plays as a midfielder for Danish Superliga club Lyngby Boldklub.

== Career ==
=== Lyngby Boldklub ===
Born and raised in Virum, Sandgrav started playing at Virum-Sorgenfri Boldklub and later joined Lyngby Boldklub at the age of 12. He worked his way up through the youth ranks, before getting his professional debut for Lyngby at the age of 16 against SønderjyskE in the Danish Cup in December 2020 at the age of 16 years and 3 months, making him Lyngby's youngest ever debutant in their history.

Five months later, in May 2021, he also made his debut in the Danish Superliga when he was substituted for the last few minutes against OB. Here he once again became the club's youngest debutant - this time in the Danish Superliga.

In the following season, however, with Lyngby relegated to the Danish 1st Division, Sandgrav made just two appearances, playing the rest of the season for the club's U-19 team.

In the 2022–23 season, he did not get any playing time in the first team for the entire season, but was rewarded in December 2022 with a contract extension until June 2026 and would become a permanent part of the first team squad from the coming summer.

== Honours ==
Lyngby

- Danish 1st Division: 2025–26
