= Mads Enggård =

Danish footballer (born 2004)

Personal information
- Full name: Mads Enggård
- Date of birth: 20 January 2004 (age 22)
- Place of birth: Engesvang, Denmark
- Height: 1.80 m (5 ft 11 in)
- Position: Midfielder

Team information
- Current team: Mjällby
- Number: 6

Youth career
- Engesvang BK
- Ikast FS
- Midtjylland
- Randers

Senior career*
Years	Team	Apps	(Gls)
2020–2024	Randers	59	(4)
2024–2026	Molde	22	(0)
2025–2026	→ Vejle (loan)	25	(0)
2026–	Mjällby	0	(0)

International career^{‡}
2020	Denmark U17	1	(0)
2021–2022	Denmark U18	11	(0)
2022–2023	Denmark U19	8	(0)
2023–2025	Denmark U20	5	(1)
2023–	Denmark U21	6	(0)
- * Club domestic league appearances and goals as of 18 August 2026 ‡ National team caps and goals as of 14 November 2025

Mads Enggård (born 20 January 2004) is a Danish professional footballer who plays as a midfielder for Allsvenskan club Mjällby.

== Career ==
=== Randers FC ===
Enggård joined Randers FC as a U15 player from FC Midtjylland. He played his way up through the youth ranks and made his debut for Randers in the autumn of 2020 at the age of 16, when he came on in a Danish Cup game against Aarhus Fremad on 27 November 2020. He made one more appearance that season - also in a Danish Cup match - while sitting on the bench in four Danish Superliga matches.

In the 2021–22 season, Enggård's breakthrough began in earnest. After an appearance against Leicester City in the UEFA Europa Conference League in February 2022, he made his Danish Superliga debut on 4 March 2022 against FC Copenhagen. He made seven league appearances in that season.

On 25 August 2022, Enggård signed a new deal with Randers until June 2025. In July 2023, Enggård was again given a new contract, this time until June 2027. It was precisely in this 2023–24 season that young Enggård had his big breakthrough and became a profile, both in Randers, but also in the Danish Superliga.

=== Molde ===
On 19 August 2024, Enggård signed a four-year contract with Eliteserien club Molde.

A year later, in August 2025, due to lack of playing time, Enggård returned to Denmark, signing a loan-deal for the remainder of the season with Danish Superliga club Vejle Boldklub.

== Honours ==
Individual

- Danish Superliga Goal of the Month: July 2024,
