= Gustav Christensen (footballer) =

Danish footballer (born 2004)

Personal information
- Full name: Gustav Ørsøe Christensen
- Date of birth: 7 September 2004 (age 22)
- Place of birth: Ikast, Denmark
- Height: 1.78 m (5 ft 10 in)
- Position: Left-back

Team information
- Current team: Kristiansund (on loan from Hertha BSC)
- Number: 24

Youth career
- Ikast
- Midtjylland

Senior career*
Years	Team	Apps	(Gls)
2022–2023	Midtjylland	0	(0)
2023–	Hertha BSC	14	(0)
2023–	Hertha BSC II	19	(8)
2025–2026	→ FC Ingolstadt 04 (loan)	45	(1)
2026–	→ Kristiansund (loan)	0	(0)

International career^{‡}
2019–2020	Denmark U16	10	(4)
2020	Denmark U17	1	(2)
2021–2022	Denmark U18	9	(6)
2022–2023	Denmark U19	9	(3)
2023–2025	Denmark U20	10	(3)
- * Club domestic league appearances and goals as of 29 May 2026 ‡ National team caps and goals as of 13 June 2025

Gustav Ørsøe Christensen (born 7 September 2004) is a Danish professional footballer who plays as a winger for Eliteserien club Kristiansund, on loan from 2. Bundesliga club Hertha BSC.

== Professional career ==
Christensen is a youth product of Ikast and Midtjylland, and worked his way up the latter's youth systems before being promoted to their reserves in 2022. On 26 September 2019, he signed his first professional contract with Midtjylland. He made his professional and senior debut with Midtjylland as a late substitute in a 6–0 Danish Cup win over FA 2000 on 19 October 2022, where he scored his side's 5th goal.

On 1 July 2023, Christensen moved to Hertha BSC.

On 3 February 2025, Christensen joined FC Ingolstadt 04 on loan until the end of the season, with an option to make the move permanent. On 10 May 2025, the loan was extended for the 2025–26 season.

== International career ==
Christensen is a youth international for Denmark, having played for the Denmark U19s.
