= Oswaldo Virgen =

Mexican footballer (born 2005)

Personal information
- Full name: Oswaldo Michel Virgen Ureña
- Date of birth: 7 April 2005 (age 21)
- Place of birth: Guadalajara, Jalisco, Mexico
- Height: 1.80 m (5 ft 11 in)
- Position: Forward

Team information
- Current team: Toluca
- Number: 23

Youth career
- 2021–2025: Toluca

Senior career*
Years	Team	Apps	(Gls)
2025–	Toluca	13	(2)

International career^{‡}
2025	Mexico U20	9	(2)
- * Club domestic league appearances and goals as of 30 August 2026 ‡ National team caps and goals as of 11 October 2025

Oswaldo Michel Virgen Ureña (born 7 April 2005) is a Mexican professional footballer who plays as a forward for Liga MX club Toluca.

== Club career ==
=== Toluca ===
Virgen began his career at the academy of Toluca, progressing through all categories, until making his professional debut on 16 July 2025, being subbed on in the second half of a 4–2 win against Santos Laguna and on 13 September 2025, he scored his first goal as a professional in a 3–1 win against Puebla.

== Career statistics ==
=== Club ===
As of 13 June 2026

Appearances and goals by club, season and competition
Club	Season	League			Cup		Continental		Club World Cup		Other		Total	
Club	Season	Division	Apps	Goals	Apps	Goals	Apps	Goals	Apps	Goals	Apps	Goals	Apps	Goals
Toluca	2025–26	Liga MX	13	1	—		—		—		—		13	1
Career total			13	1	0	0	0	0	0	0	0	0	13	1

== International career ==
In 2025, Virgen was called up by coach Eduardo Arce to represent Mexico at the FIFA U-20 World Cup held in Chile.

== Honours ==
Toluca

- Liga MX: Apertura 2025
- CONCACAF Champions Cup: 2026
