= Mexico women's national under-23 football team =

Women's national under-23 football team representing Mexico

Mexico Women's U-23
- Nickname(s): El Tri Femenil; El Tri
- Association: Federacion Mexicana de Futbol
- Confederation: CONCACAF (North America)
- Head coach: Vanessa Martinez
- FIFA code: MEX
First colours	Second colours

First international
- Mexico 3–0 Dominican Republic (Mexico City, Mexico; 28 June 2025)

Biggest win
- Jamaica 0–7 Mexico (Moca, Dominican Republic; 3 March 2026)

Biggest defeat
- United States 1–0 Mexico (Miami, United States; 2 August 2026)
Medal record
Central American and Caribbean Games
Gold medal – first place	2026 Santo Domingo	Team

The Mexico U-23 women's national football team, is the national women’s under-23 football team of Mexico, and is operated and manage by the Federacion Mexicana de Futbol (Mexican Football Federation).

The team was formed in early 2025 with the objective to prepare players between the ages of 20-23 to make the jump to the senior national team. To accomplished this objective, the team will participate in regional tournaments such as the Central American and Caribbean Games, which in the past the senior national team would attend.

== History ==
The Mexico U-23 women’s national football team was formed on 17 February 2025 by the Mexican Football Federation as part of a reorganization and expansion of the youth program of the Mexico women's national football team, with the goal of preparing potential senior national team players between the ages 20–23 to be ready to make the jump to the senior team. Former Mexico national team player, Vanessa Martinez, was chosen as the first head-coach of the team The team had its first called up in 1 April 2025 for a training camp and subsequent match against Toluca.

The team played its first international match on 28 June 2025, facing the Dominican Republic women's national football team in Mexico City. The match ended in a 3–0 victory for Mexico.

On July 2026, the Mexican Football Federation announced that the team would represent Mexico in the women’s football tournament of the 2026 Central American and Caribbean Games, a competition in which in the past the senior team would participate. The Mexico U-23 team ended up winning the gold medal of the competition after defeating Colombia on penalties in the final on 5 August 2026. The team went unbeaten throughout the tournament.

== Results and schedule ==
The following is a list of match results in the last 12 months, as well as any future matches that have been scheduled.

=== 2025 ===
Win Draw Lose Fixture

25 October 2025 Friendly	Denmark	1–1	Mexico	Senec, Slovakia
				Stadium: National Training Center

28 October 2025 Friendly	Finland	1–1	Mexico	Järvenpää, Finland
	Råtts 63'	Report	Garcia 18'

=== 2026 ===
Win Draw Lose Fixture

3 Mach 2026 Friendly	United States	1–0	Mexico	Miami, Florida
	Weber 14'	Report		Stadium: FIU Soccer Stadium; Referee: Jorge Escobar (USA)

6 March 2026 Friendly	United States	0–2	Mexico	Miami, Florida
				Stadium: FIU Soccer Stadium

5 June 2026 Friendly	Norway	1–1	Mexico	Sweden
	Josendal 53'		Bosch 52'

8 June 2026 Friendly	Sweden	1–1	Mexico	Kalmar, Sweden
	Rehnberg 78'	Report	García 59'	Stadium: Fredriksskans

22 July 2026 Friendly	Dominican Republic	0–3	Mexico	Santo Domingo, Dominican Republic
			Frías 58'; Veloz 75'; Pérez 78'	Stadium: Centro Olímpico Juan Pablo Duarte

29 July 2026 2026 Central American and Caribbean Games - GS	Mexico	0–0	Puerto Rico	Santiago de los Caballeros, Dominican Republic
		Report		Stadium: Cibao Stadium; Attendance: 236

31 July 2026 2026 Central American and Caribbean Games - GS	Colombia	0–1	Mexico	Moca, Dominican Republic
		Report	García 29'	Stadium: Moca 85 Stadium; Attendance: 287

2 August 2026 2026 Central American and Caribbean Games - GS	Jamaica	0–7	Mexico	Moca, Dominican Republic
		Report	Frías 25'; Coury 29', 70'; Sanchez 38'; Vargas 65'; Flores 74'; Rausch 86'	Stadium: Moca 85 Stadium; Attendance: 109

4 August 2026 2026 Central American and Caribbean Games - SF	Mexico	4–1	El Salvador	Moca, Dominican Republic
	Bosch 25'; Frías 90', 120+3'; Vargas 115'	Report	Lopez 71'	Stadium: Moca 85 Stadium; Attendance: 109

6 August 2026 2026 Central American and Caribbean Games - Final	Colombia	1–1 (2–4 p)	Mexico	Santiago de los Caballeros, Dominican Republic
	Guerra 118'	Report	Mendoza 120+4'	Stadium: Cibao Stadium; Attendance: 540
	Penalties
	Carvajal (penalty scored); Guerra (penalty missed); Ibargüen (penalty missed); Viafara (penalty scored)		Pérez (penalty scored); Colin (penalty scored); Vargas (penalty scored); Veloz (penalty scored)

== Players ==
=== Current squad ===
The following 20 players were named to the squad on 17 July 2026 to compete at the 2026 Central American and Caribbean Games.

No.	Pos.	Player	Date of birth (age)	Club
	GK	Celeste Espino	August 9, 2003 (age 23)	(Mexican Football Federation) América
	GK	Azul Álvarez	January 1, 2003 (age 23)	(United States Soccer Federation) Baylor Bears
	DF	Karol Bernal	February 2, 2003 (age 23)	(Mexican Football Federation) América
	DF	Natalia Colin	May 17, 2005 (age 21)	(Mexican Football Federation) Guadalajara
	DF	Carol Cázares	June 14, 2003 (age 23)	(Mexican Football Federation) Monterrey
	DF	Alexandra Godínez	May 16, 2003 (age 23)	(Mexican Football Federation) Monterrey
	DF	Diana Guatemala	March 14, 2002 (age 24)	(Mexican Football Federation) Toluca
	DF	Ana Mendoza	August 7, 2005 (age 21)	(Mexican Football Federation) UNAM
	DF	Tanna Sánchez	December 21, 2002 (age 23)	(Mexican Football Federation) Cruz Azul
	DF	Talia Coury	December 14, 2005 (age 20)	(Mexican Football Federation) Tigres
	MF	Silvana Flores	April 18, 2002 (age 24)	(Italian Football Federation) Como 1907
	MF	Nicole Pérez	August 30, 2001 (age 25)	(Mexican Football Federation) Monterrey
	MF	Ella Sanchez	March 8, 2005 (age 21)	(Mexican Football Federation) Pachuca
	MF	Fátima Servín	May 17, 2005 (age 21)	(Mexican Football Federation) Monterrey
	MF	Lourdes Bosch	August 17, 2001 (age 25)	(Mexican Football Federation) Monterrey
	MF	América Frías	January 19, 2004 (age 22)	(Mexican Football Federation) Cruz Azul
	FW	Paola García	March 29, 2004 (age 22)	(Mexican Football Federation) Pachuca
	FW	Mayalu Rausch	April 11, 2001 (age 25)	(Mexican Football Federation) León
	FW	Valerie Vargas	May 25, 2005 (age 21)	(Mexican Football Federation) Monterrey
	FW	Allison Veloz	January 9, 2001 (age 25)	(Mexican Football Federation) Pachuca

Notes

- INJ - Injury
- PRE - Withdrawal prior to camp

== Honours ==
- Central American and Caribbean Games
  - (gold) Champions (1): 2026
