= 2024 Sud Ladies Cup =

5ème Sud Ladies Cup – Tournoi Maurice Revello (in French)

Tournament details
- Host country: France
- Dates: 27 May – 4 June
- Teams: 6 (from 5 associations)
- Venue(s): 2 (in 2 host cities)

Final positions
- Champions: France (1st title)
- Runners-up: Mexico
- Third place: Japan
- Fourth place: Morocco

Tournament statistics
- Matches played: 9
- Goals scored: 27 (3 per match)
- Top scorer(s): (Colombia) Daniela Garavito (2 goals)
- Best player(s): (Mexico) Natalia Colin
- Best goalkeeper: (Mexico) Itzel Velasco

The 2024 Sud Ladies Cup (officially French: 5ème Sud Ladies Cup – Tournoi Maurice Revello) was the fifth edition of the Sud Ladies Cup women's football tournament. It was held in the department of Vaucluse from 27 May to 4 June 2024. In this year, the tournament was contested by under-20 national teams.

Japan were the defending champions, but the hosts France would win the final on penalties.

== Venues ==
2024 Sud Ladies Cup is located in Provence-Alpes-Côte d'Azur
Avignon	Robion
Parc des Sports	Stade Éric Di Meco
Capacity: 17,518	Capacity:

== Teams ==
AFC

- Japan (3rd participation)

CAF

- Morocco (1st participation)

CONCACAF

- Mexico (3rd participation)
- Panama (2nd participation)

CONMEBOL

- Colombia (1st participation)

UEFA

- France (5th participation)

== Group stage ==
All times are local CET (UTC+2).

=== Group A ===
Pos	Team	Pld	W	D	L	GF	GA	GD	Pts	Qualification
1	Mexico	2	1	1	0	4	1	+3	4	Advance to final
2	Japan	2	1	0	1	2	4	−2	3	Advance to third place play-off
3	Colombia	2	0	1	1	2	3	−1	2	Advance to fifth place play-off

Source: Sud Ladies Cup
27 May 2024
21:00

Mexico	1–1	Colombia
Quiñónez 50'	Report	Viancha 30'
Penalties
Frías (penalty scored); Colin (penalty missed); Gordon (penalty scored); Valadez (penalty missed)	2–4	(penalty scored) Álvarez; (penalty scored) Perlaza; (penalty missed) Osorio; (penalty scored) Ortegón; (penalty scored) Garavito

Parc des Sports, Avignon
Referee: Abigail Byrne (England)

29 May 2024
21:00

Colombia	1–2	Japan
N. Hernández 61'	Report	Kashimura 48'; Sasaki 73'

Parc des Sports, Avignon
Referee: Anastasia Mylopoulou (Greece)

1 June 2024
21:00

Japan	0–3	Mexico
	Report	Vargas 34'; Saldívar 46'; Soto 79'

Parc des Sports, Avignon
Referee: Anya Voigt (United States)

=== Group B ===
Pos	Team	Pld	W	D	L	GF	GA	GD	Pts	Qualification
1	France (H)	2	2	0	0	6	0	+6	6	Advance to final
2	Morocco	2	1	0	1	2	4	−2	3	Advance to third place play-off
3	Panama	2	0	0	2	1	5	−4	0	Advance to fifth place play-off

Source: Sud Ladies Cup
(H) Hosts
28 May 2024
21:00

France	3–0	Morocco
Chossenotte 30'; Mendy 37'; Scannapiéco 89' (pen.)	Report

Parc des Sports, Avignon
Referee: Anya Voigt (United States)

31 May 2024
21:00

Morocco	2–1	Panama
El Madani 46'; Jbilou 90+1'	Report	Salazar 37'

Parc des Sports, Avignon
Referee: Abigail Byrne (England)

2 June 2024
21:00

France	3–0	Panama
A. Marques 5'; Seguin 68'; Haugou 88'	Report

Parc des Sports, Avignon
Referee: Anastasia Mylopoulou (Greece)

== Final stage ==
=== Fifth place play-off ===
4 June 2024
11:00

Colombia	4–0	Panama
Muñoz 36'; González 60'; Garavito 72', 87'

Stade Éric Di Meco, Robion
Referee: Anastasia Mylopoulou (Greece)

=== Third place play-off ===
4 June 2024
17:00

Japan	4–2	Morocco
Hijikata 19'; Itamura 33'; Koyama 48'; Okamura 58'		Boussate 45+7'; El Ghazouani 51'

Parc des Sports, Avignon
Referee: Anya Voigt (United States)

=== Final ===
4 June 2024
21:00

Mexico	0–0	France
Penalties
Frías (penalty missed); Vargas (penalty scored); Colin (penalty scored); García (penalty missed); Velasco (penalty scored)	3–4	(penalty scored) Haugou; (penalty scored) A. Marques; (penalty missed) Effa Effa; (penalty scored) Rastocle; (penalty scored) Seguin

Parc des Sports, Avignon
Referee: Abigail Byrne (England)

== Statistics ==
=== Goalscorers ===
There were 27 goals scored in 9 matches, for an average of 3 goals per match.

2 goals

- (Colombia) Daniela Garavito

1 goal

- (Colombia) Ana Milé González
- (Colombia) Natalia Hernández
- (Colombia) Yésica Muñoz
- (Colombia) Karla Viancha
- (France) Shana Chossenotte
- (France) Pauline Haugou
- (France) Alice Marques
- (France) Mélinda Mendy
- (France) Dona Scannapiéco
- (France) Maëlle Seguin
- (Japan) Maya Hijikata
- (Japan) Mao Itamura
- (Japan) Nana Kashimura
- (Japan) Shinomi Koyama
- (Japan) Raika Okamura
- (Japan) Rio Sasaki
- (Mexico) Julia Quiñónez
- (Mexico) Montserrat Saldívar
- (Mexico) Alice Soto
- (Mexico) Valerie Vargas
- (Morocco) Sofia Boussate
- (Morocco) Fatima El Ghazouani
- (Morocco) Doha El Madani
- (Morocco) Hajar Jbilou
- (Panama) Deysiré Salazar

Source: Sud Ladies Cup

=== Top assists ===
2 assists

- (Mexico) América Frías
- (Morocco) Rania Boutiebi

1 assist

- (Colombia) Greicy Landázury
- (Colombia) Karla Torres
- (Colombia) Karla Viancha
- (France) Adèle Connesson
- (France) Jade Rastocle
- (France) Camille Robillard
- (Japan) Manaka Hayashi
- (Japan) Shinomi Koyama
- (Japan) Miyu Matsunaga
- (Japan) Aemu Oyama
- (Mexico) Tatiana Flores
- (Morocco) Doha El Madani

=== Discipline ===
1 red card

- (Mexico) Ana Mendoza (against Colombia (red card) )

1 indirect red card

- (Morocco) Dania Boussatta (against France (yellow card) (yellow-red card) )
- (Panama) Mireilis Rojas (against Colombia (yellow card) (yellow-red card) )

2 yellow cards

- (Colombia) Mary José Álvarez
- (France) Marion Haelewyn
- (France) Alice Marques
- (Morocco) Hajar Jbilou
- (Panama) Sherline King

1 yellow card

- (Colombia) Ana Milé González
- (Colombia) Natalia Hernández
- (Colombia) Yésica Muñoz
- (Colombia) Juana Ortegón
- (Colombia) Katerine Osorio
- (France) Pauline Haugou
- (France) Chloé Neller
- (France) Léa Notel
- (France) Maëlle Seguin
- (Mexico) Tatiana Flores
- (Mexico) Ivonne González
- (Mexico) Fátima Servín
- (Mexico) Alice Soto
- (Mexico) Valerie Vargas
- (Morocco) Djennah Cherif
- (Panama) Sara Nieto
- (Panama) Génesis Pinto
- (Panama) Ana Quintero
- (Panama) Delineth Rivera
- (Panama) Meredith Rosas
- (Panama) Deysiré Salazar

=== Awards ===
After the final, the following players is rewarded for their performances during the competition.

- Best player: (Mexico) Natalia Colin
- Best goalkeeper: (Mexico) Itzel Velasco
- Topscorer: (Colombia) Daniela Garavito

== See also ==
- 2024 Maurice Revello Tournament
