= 2022 Sud Ladies Cup squads =

The 2022 Sud Ladies Cup was an international association football tournament held in Bouches-du-Rhône, France. The four national teams involved in the tournament were required to register a squad of 24 players; only players in these squads were eligible to take part in the tournament.

The age listed for each player is on 22 June 2022, the first day of the tournament. The club listed was the club for which the player last played a competitive match prior to the tournament. The nationality for each club reflects the national association (not the league) to which the club is affiliated. A flag is included for coaches that are of a different nationality than their own national team.

== France ==
The 24-player squad was announced on 16 June 2022. On 20 June, Chloé Tapia withdrew and was replaced by Baby-Jordy Benera.

Head coach: Sonia Haziraj

No.	Pos.	Player	Date of birth (age)	Club
1	GK	Marie-Morgane Sieber	15 July 2002 (aged 19)	(French Football Federation) Rodez
2	DF	Alice Sombath	16 October 2003 (aged 18)	(French Football Federation) Lyon
3	DF	Célina Ould Hocine	3 February 2002 (aged 20)	(French Football Federation) Paris FC
4	DF	Kysha Sylla	4 February 2004 (aged 18)	(French Football Federation) Lyon
5	DF	Thiniba Samoura	11 February 2004 (aged 18)	(French Football Federation) Paris FC
6	MF	Mégane Hoeltzel	21 April 2003 (aged 19)	(French Football Federation) Strasbourg
7	FW	Esther Mbakem-Niaro	7 January 2002 (aged 20)	(French Football Federation) Montpellier
8	MF	Magnaba Folquet	3 November 2003 (aged 18)	(French Football Federation) Paris Saint-Germain
9	FW	Manssita Traoré	9 September 2003 (aged 18)	(French Football Federation) Paris Saint-Germain
10	FW	Vicki Becho	3 October 2003 (aged 18)	(French Football Federation) Stade de Reims
11	DF	Lou Bogaert	25 June 2004 (aged 17)	(French Football Federation) Lille
12	FW	Yrma Mzé Issa	26 October 2003 (aged 18)	(French Football Federation) Lyon
13	MF	Laurina Fazer	13 October 2003 (aged 18)	(French Football Federation) Paris Saint-Germain
14	DF	Anaëlle Tchakounte	25 August 2003 (aged 18)	(French Football Federation) Paris FC
15	FW	Jade Nassi	26 April 2003 (aged 19)	(French Football Federation) Saint-Malo
16	GK	Marie Petiteau	12 June 2002 (aged 20)	(French Football Federation) Saint-Malo
17	MF	Océane Hurtré	17 February 2004 (aged 18)	(French Football Federation) Paris Saint-Germain
18	DF	Jade Le Guilly	18 June 2002 (aged 20)	(French Football Federation) Paris Saint-Germain
19	MF	Océane Picard	21 April 2002 (aged 20)	(French Football Federation) Metz
20	FW	Hawa Sangaré	20 July 2002 (aged 19)	(French Football Federation) Dijon
21	GK	Océane Toussaint	20 February 2004 (aged 18)	(French Football Federation) Paris Saint-Germain
22	FW	Kenza Chapelle	22 August 2002 (aged 19)	(French Football Federation) Fleury
23	MF	Cyrielle Blanc	23 January 2003 (aged 19)	(French Football Federation) Montpellier
24	MF	Baby-Jordy Benera	24 May 2004 (aged 18)	(French Football Federation) Paris Saint-Germain

== Mexico ==
The 20-player squad was announced on 15 June 2022.

Head coach: Maribel Domínguez

No.	Pos.	Player	Date of birth (age)	Club
1	GK	Celeste Espino	8 September 2003 (aged 18)	(Mexican Football Federation) Guadalajara
2	DF	Daniela Monroy	21 September 2002 (aged 19)	(Mexican Football Federation) Cruz Azul
3	DF	Samantha López	16 April 2003 (aged 19)	(Mexican Football Federation) Pumas UNAM
4	DF	Kinberly Guzmán	19 September 2002 (aged 19)	(Mexican Football Federation) Guadalajara
5	DF	Alexxandra Ramírez	23 May 2002 (aged 20)	(Mexican Football Federation) Santos Laguna
6	DF	Jana Gutiérrez	25 October 2003 (aged 18)	(Mexican Football Federation) Tigres UANL
7	FW	Aylín Avilez	18 May 2003 (aged 19)	(Mexican Football Federation) Monterrey
8	MF	Daniela Delgado	27 September 2002 (aged 19)	(Mexican Football Federation) Santos Laguna
9	FW	Alexia Villanueva	22 February 2003 (aged 19)	(Mexican Football Federation) Santos Laguna
10	MF	Anette Vázquez	11 March 2002 (aged 20)	(Mexican Football Federation) Guadalajara
11	MF	Bridgette Marín	1 January 2002 (aged 20)	(United States Soccer Federation) PSV Union
12	GK	Paola Manrique	28 April 2002 (aged 20)	(Mexican Football Federation) Pachuca
13	DF	Karol Bernal	2 February 2003 (aged 19)	(Mexican Football Federation) Guadalajara
14	DF	Carol Cázares	16 May 2003 (aged 19)	(Mexican Football Federation) Tigres UANL
15	MF	Isabella Gutiérrez	9 March 2004 (aged 18)	(United States Soccer Federation) East Carolina Pirates
16	MF	Natalia Mauleón	4 February 2002 (aged 20)	(Mexican Football Federation) Club América
17	MF	Ammanda Marroquín	3 April 2003 (aged 19)	(Mexican Football Federation) Tigres UANL
18	FW	América Frías	19 January 2004 (aged 18)	(United States Soccer Federation) Bay Area Surf
19	MF	Paola Chavero	16 May 2002 (aged 20)	(Mexican Football Federation) Pumas UNAM
20	MF	Blanky Serrano	29 October 2004 (aged 17)	(Mexican Football Federation) Pachuca

== Netherlands ==
The 24-player squad was announced on 2 June 2022. On 13 June, Daniëlle de Jong withdrew due to injury and was replaced by Femke Liefting.

Head coach: Roos Kwakkenbos

No.	Pos.	Player	Date of birth (age)	Club
1	GK	Lisan Alkemade	23 July 2002 (aged 19)	(Royal Dutch Football Association) PSV
2	DF	Kim Everaerts	6 January 2002 (aged 20)	(Royal Dutch Football Association) Twente
3	DF	Marit Auée	11 January 2002 (aged 20)	(Royal Dutch Football Association) PEC Zwolle
4	DF	Samantha van Diemen	28 January 2002 (aged 20)	(Royal Dutch Football Association) Feyenoord
5	DF	Nina Nijstad	5 March 2003 (aged 19)	(Royal Dutch Football Association) Heerenveen
6	MF	Dana Foederer	27 July 2002 (aged 19)	(Royal Dutch Football Association) Heerenveen
7	FW	Liz Rijsbergen	14 February 2002 (aged 20)	(Royal Dutch Football Association) ADO Den Haag
8	MF	Ella Peddemors	6 August 2002 (aged 19)	(Royal Dutch Football Association) Twente
9	FW	Sanne Koopman	15 November 2002 (aged 19)	(Royal Dutch Football Association) Alkmaar
10	MF	Danique Noordman	21 February 2004 (aged 18)	(Royal Dutch Football Association) PEC Zwolle
11	FW	Ziva Henry	31 May 2004 (aged 18)	(Royal Dutch Football Association) Ajax
12	DF	Louise van Oosten	2 July 2004 (aged 17)	(Royal Dutch Football Association) ADO Den Haag
13	DF	Fenna Meijer	7 February 2003 (aged 19)	(Royal Dutch Football Association) Heerenveen
14	DF	Senna Koeleman	14 July 2003 (aged 18)	(Royal Dutch Football Association) PSV
15	DF	Jeva Walk	18 January 2004 (aged 18)	(Royal Dutch Football Association) PEC Zwolle
16	GK	Claire Dinkla	22 June 2002 (aged 20)	(Royal Dutch Football Association) Heerenveen
17	FW	Zera Hulswit	29 April 2003 (aged 19)	(Royal Dutch Football Association) PSV
18	MF	Lena Mahieu	14 March 2004 (aged 18)	(Royal Dutch Football Association) PSV
19	FW	Nikée van Dijk	24 June 2003 (aged 18)	(Royal Dutch Football Association) Heerenveen
20	MF	Rosa van Gool	9 February 2004 (aged 18)	(Royal Dutch Football Association) Ajax
21	MF	Tess van Bentem	3 March 2003 (aged 19)	(Royal Dutch Football Association) PEC Zwolle
22	FW	Romée van de Lavoir	22 December 2002 (aged 19)	(Royal Dutch Football Association) Feyenoord
23	GK	Femke Liefting	2 January 2005 (aged 17)	(Royal Dutch Football Association) Alkmaar
24	FW	Charlotte Hulst	22 April 2003 (aged 19)	(Royal Dutch Football Association) Alkmaar

== United States ==
The 24-player squad was announced on 14 June 2022.

Head coach: Tracey Kevins

No.	Pos.	Player	Date of birth (age)	Club
1	GK	Mia Justus	3 September 2002 (aged 19)	(United States Soccer Federation) Florida State Seminoles
2	DF	Evelyn Shores	29 December 2004 (aged 17)	(United States Soccer Federation) Tophat
3	DF	Ayo Oke	5 April 2003 (aged 19)	(United States Soccer Federation) California Golden Bears
4	DF	Emily Mason	23 October 2002 (aged 19)	(United States Soccer Federation) Rutgers Scarlet Knights
5	DF	Lilly Reale	12 August 2003 (aged 18)	(United States Soccer Federation) UCLA Bruins
6	MF	Emily Colton	23 June 2003 (aged 18)	(United States Soccer Federation) North Carolina Tar Heels
7	FW	Simone Jackson	28 January 2003 (aged 19)	(United States Soccer Federation) USC Trojans
8	MF	Carina Lageyre	1 November 2003 (aged 18)	(United States Soccer Federation) Florida United
9	FW	Michelle Cooper	4 December 2002 (aged 19)	(United States Soccer Federation) Duke Blue Devils
10	MF	Alexis Missimo	30 January 2003 (aged 19)	(United States Soccer Federation) Texas Longhorns
11	DF	Makenna Morris	26 April 2002 (aged 20)	(United States Soccer Federation) Clemson Tigers
12	GK	Neeku Purcell	7 October 2003 (aged 18)	(United States Soccer Federation) OL Reign Academy
13	MF	Olivia Moultrie	17 September 2005 (aged 16)	(United States Soccer Federation) Portland Thorns
14	DF	Lauren Flynn	22 May 2002 (aged 20)	(United States Soccer Federation) Florida State Seminoles
15	DF	Aidan McConnell	1 February 2003 (aged 19)	(United States Soccer Federation) Wisconsin Badgers
16	FW	Avery Patterson	14 June 2002 (aged 20)	(United States Soccer Federation) North Carolina Tar Heels
17	MF	Sally Menti	10 March 2002 (aged 20)	(United States Soccer Federation) Santa Clara Broncos
18	FW	Trinity Byars	29 January 2003 (aged 19)	(United States Soccer Federation) Texas Longhorns
19	FW	Andrea Kitahata	1 January 2003 (aged 19)	(United States Soccer Federation) Stanford Cardinal
20	MF	Talia DellaPeruta	19 April 2002 (aged 20)	(United States Soccer Federation) North Carolina Tar Heels
21	MF	Korbin Albert	26 April 2003 (aged 19)	(United States Soccer Federation) Notre Dame Fighting Irish
23	FW	Ally Sentnor	18 February 2004 (aged 18)	(United States Soccer Federation) North Carolina Tar Heels
25	FW	Jaedyn Shaw	20 November 2004 (aged 17)	(United States Soccer Federation) Washington Spirit
	DF	Laney Rouse	31 August 2002 (aged 19)	(United States Soccer Federation) Virginia Cavaliers
