= 2022 FIFA U-17 Women's World Cup squads =

Each country's final squad has to comprise 21 players. The final squads were confirmed by FIFA on 4 October 2022.

== Group A ==
=== Brazil ===
Head coach: Simone Jatobá

No.	Pos.	Player	Date of birth (age)	Club
1	GK	Leilane	29 June 2005 (aged 17)	(Brazilian Football Confederation) Ferroviária
2	DF	Luana Gusmão	4 August 2006 (aged 16)	(Brazilian Football Confederation) Ferroviária
3	DF	Guta	5 May 2005 (aged 17)	(Brazilian Football Confederation) Internacional
4	DF	Grazy	18 August 2005 (aged 17)	(Brazilian Football Confederation) Ferroviária
5	DF	Kedima	25 March 2005 (aged 17)	(Brazilian Football Confederation) São Paulo
6	DF	Alice	9 May 2005 (aged 17)	(Brazilian Football Confederation) Internacional
7	FW	Aline	7 July 2005 (aged 17)	(Brazilian Football Confederation) Ferroviária
8	MF	Ana Julia	30 April 2005 (aged 17)	(Brazilian Football Confederation) São Paulo
9	FW	Jhonson	13 October 2005 (aged 16)	(Brazilian Football Confederation) Toledo
10	MF	Carol	1 June 2005 (aged 17)	(Brazilian Football Confederation) São Paulo
11	FW	Dudinha	4 July 2005 (aged 17)	(Brazilian Football Confederation) São Paulo
12	GK	Elu	8 June 2006 (aged 16)	(Brazilian Football Confederation) São Paulo
13	DF	Ana Beatriz	30 April 2006 (aged 16)	(Brazilian Football Confederation) São Paulo
14	MF	Myka	17 January 2007 (aged 15)	(Brazilian Football Confederation) Internacional
15	MF	Rebeca	1 September 2005 (aged 17)	(Brazilian Football Confederation) Fortaleza
16	FW	Ana Flávia	31 August 2005 (aged 17)	(Brazilian Football Confederation) São Paulo
17	MF	Lara	1 September 2005 (aged 17)	(Brazilian Football Confederation) Corinthians
18	MF	Gabi Berchon	12 September 2005 (aged 17)	(Brazilian Football Confederation) Internacional
19	FW	Rhaissa	17 July 2006 (aged 16)	(Brazilian Football Confederation) Ferroviária
20	MF	Juju	18 January 2007 (aged 15)	(United States Soccer Federation) Florida United
21	GK	Mariana	7 July 2005 (aged 17)	(Brazilian Football Confederation) Fluminense

=== India ===
Head coach: (Sweden) Thomas Dennerby

No.	Pos.	Player	Date of birth (age)	Club
1	GK	Monalisha Moirangthem	3 July 2006 (aged 16)	(All India Football Federation) KRYPHSA FC
2	DF	Purnima Kumari	10 February 2005 (aged 17)	(All India Football Federation) Jharkhand
3	DF	Naketa	9 September 2005 (aged 17)	(All India Football Federation) ARA FC
4	DF	Shilky Hemam	23 November 2005 (aged 16)	(All India Football Federation) Young Welfare Club
5	DF	Astam Oraon	5 February 2005 (aged 17)	(All India Football Federation) Jharkhand
6	MF	Babina Lisham	1 February 2005 (aged 17)	(All India Football Federation) Companeroes SC
7	FW	Neha	19 May 2006 (aged 16)	(All India Football Federation) HOPS FC
8	MF	Kajol Dsouza	28 April 2006 (aged 16)	(All India Football Federation) Parikrma FC
9	FW	Lynda Serto	28 February 2005 (aged 17)	(All India Football Federation) Young Welfare Club
10	FW	Lavanya Upadhyay	25 May 2006 (aged 16)	(All India Football Federation) Signature FC
11	FW	Anita Kumari	9 August 2005 (aged 17)	(All India Football Federation) Jharkhand
12	MF	Sheila Loktongbam	16 August 2006 (aged 16)	(All India Football Federation) ICSA Irengbam
13	GK	Melody Keisham	2 March 2006 (aged 16)	(All India Football Federation) Young Welfare Club
14	FW	Sudha Tirkey	8 October 2005 (aged 17)	(All India Football Federation) Jharkhand
15	MF	Shailja	29 August 2005 (aged 17)	(All India Football Federation) Hindustan FC
16	MF	Shubhangi Singh	11 June 2006 (aged 16)	(All India Football Federation) Bhuj Kutch FC
17	MF	Nitu Linda	5 April 2006 (aged 16)	(All India Football Federation) Jharkhand
18	FW	Rejiya Laishram	1 February 2005 (aged 17)	(All India Football Federation) Young Welfare Club
19	DF	Varshika	22 September 2006 (aged 16)	(All India Football Federation) HOPS FC
20	DF	Kajal	12 January 2005 (aged 17)	(All India Football Federation) HOPS FC
21	GK	Anjali Munda	10 May 2005 (aged 17)	(All India Football Federation) Jharkhand

=== Morocco ===
Head coach: (France) Anthony Rimasson

No.	Pos.	Player	Date of birth (age)	Club
1	GK	Louisa Derbali	29 November 2005 (aged 16)	(German Football Association) Borussia Mönchengladbach
2	DF	Hajar Said	22 May 2005 (aged 17)	(Royal Moroccan Football Federation) Najah Souss Agadir
3	DF	Dania Boussatta	16 February 2005 (aged 17)	(Royal Dutch Football Association) AFC DWS
4	DF	Nadia Benassou	4 February 2005 (aged 17)	(French Football Federation) FC Vendenheim
5	MF	Hiba Karami	1 June 2005 (aged 17)	(Royal Moroccan Football Federation) FUS Rabat
6	MF	Lina Aich	27 January 2006 (aged 16)	(French Football Federation) Stade Reims
7	FW	Kenza Laksiri	7 June 2006 (aged 16)	(Royal Belgian Football Association) RSC Anderlecht
8	DF	Wissal El-Assaoui	26 July 2005 (aged 17)	(Royal Moroccan Football Federation) Chabab Atlas Khénifra
9	MF	Samya Masnaoui	16 September 2005 (aged 17)	(Royal Dutch Football Association) AFC DWS
10	DF	Djennah Cherif	10 January 2006 (aged 16)	(Royal Dutch Football Association) Feyenoord Rotterdam
11	FW	Doha El-Madani	20 October 2005 (aged 16)	(Royal Moroccan Football Federation) Étoile Avenir
12	GK	Wissal Titah	28 September 2005 (aged 17)	(Royal Moroccan Football Federation) Chabab Atlas Khénifra
13	DF	Dania Mrabti	13 February 2005 (aged 17)	(Royal Dutch Football Association) Excelsior
14	FW	Kamilia Tayebi	15 February 2005 (aged 17)	(French Football Federation) FC Mulhouse
15	MF	Houda El-Mestour	12 March 2005 (aged 17)	(Royal Moroccan Football Federation) AS FAR
16	GK	Ameerah Maamry	22 May 2006 (aged 16)	(United States Soccer Federation) Racing Louisville FC
17	FW	Yasmine Zouhir	16 July 2005 (aged 17)	(French Football Federation) AS Saint-Étienne
18	MF	Ambre Basser	12 September 2005 (aged 17)	(French Football Federation) FC Girondins Bordeaux
19	MF	Mina El-Hamzaoui	15 November 2005 (aged 16)	(French Football Federation) RC Strasbourg
20	DF	Fatima El-Ghazouani	11 May 2005 (aged 17)	(French Football Federation) US Quevilly-Rouen
21	MF	Iman El-Hannachi	18 May 2005 (aged 17)	(The Football Association) Tottenham Hotspur FCW

=== United States ===
Head coach: (Spain) Natalia Astrain

No.	Pos.	Player	Date of birth (age)	Club
1	GK	Abigail Gundry	10 March 2005 (aged 17)	(United States Soccer Federation) NC Courage (ECNL)
2	DF	Nicola Fraser	25 January 2006 (aged 16)	(United States Soccer Federation) Real Colorado (ECNL)
3	DF	Savannah King	7 February 2005 (aged 17)	(United States Soccer Federation) LAFC So Cal (ECNL)
4	DF	Cameron Roller	21 June 2005 (aged 17)	(United States Soccer Federation) Solar SC (ECNL)
5	DF	Ella Emri	5 December 2005 (aged 16)	(United States Soccer Federation) San Diego Surf
6	FW	Samantha Smith	22 September 2005 (aged 17)	(United States Soccer Federation) Boise Thorns FC
7	MF	Riley Jackson	2 December 2005 (aged 16)	(United States Soccer Federation) Concorde Fire SC
8	MF	Charlotte Kohler	18 October 2005 (aged 16)	(United States Soccer Federation) Boise Thorns FC
9	FW	Taylor Suarez	27 May 2005 (aged 17)	(United States Soccer Federation) Charlotte SA
10	MF	Mia Bhuta	29 December 2005 (aged 16)	(United States Soccer Federation) Slammers FC HB Koge (ECNL)
11	FW	Nicollette Kiorpes	9 September 2005 (aged 17)	(United States Soccer Federation) NEFC
12	GK	Victoria Safradin	23 April 2005 (aged 17)	(United States Soccer Federation) International SC (OH)
13	FW	Emeri Adames	3 April 2006 (aged 16)	(United States Soccer Federation) Solar SC
14	FW	Melina Rebimbas	4 May 2005 (aged 17)	(United States Soccer Federation) Rutgers Prep
15	MF	Ella Sanchez	8 March 2005 (aged 17)	(United States Soccer Federation) Racing Louisville Academy
16	FW	Amalia Villarreal	27 March 2006 (aged 16)	(United States Soccer Federation) Solar SC (ECNL)
17	DF	Jordyn Bugg	11 August 2006 (aged 16)	(United States Soccer Federation) San Diego Surf
18	FW	Onyeka Gamero	23 February 2006 (aged 16)	(United States Soccer Federation) Beach FC (CA)
19	MF	Lauren Martinho	9 October 2005 (aged 17)	(United States Soccer Federation) NC Courage (ECNL)
20	DF	Gisele Thompson	2 December 2005 (aged 16)	(United States Soccer Federation) IMG Academy
21	GK	Valentina Amaral	5 April 2005 (aged 17)	(United States Soccer Federation) Florida Kraze Krush

== Group B ==
=== Chile ===
Head coach: Alex Castro

No.	Pos.	Player	Date of birth (age)	Club
1	GK	Catalina Mellado	23 May 2006 (aged 16)	(Football Federation of Chile) Colo-Colo
2	DF	Anaís Cifuentes	1 January 2005 (aged 17)	(Football Federation of Chile) Colo-Colo
3	DF	Monserrat Hernández	19 July 2005 (aged 17)	(Football Federation of Chile) Santiago Morning
4	DF	Tali Rovner	29 June 2005 (aged 17)	(Football Federation of Chile) Universidad Católica
5	DF	Catalina Figueroa	28 January 2005 (aged 17)	(Football Federation of Chile) Universidad Católica
6	MF	Anaís Álvarez	4 July 2007 (aged 15)	(Football Federation of Chile) Colo-Colo
7	FW	Constanza Oliver	8 December 2005 (aged 16)	(Football Federation of Chile) Santiago Morning
8	MF	Ámbar Figueroa	24 October 2007 (aged 14)	(Football Federation of Chile) Santiago Morning
9	FW	Maitte Tapia	16 September 2005 (aged 17)	(Football Federation of Chile) Palestino
10	MF	Paloma Bustamante	7 December 2005 (aged 16)	(Football Federation of Chile) Colo-Colo
11	FW	Natsumy Millones	1 January 2007 (aged 15)	(Football Federation of Chile) Coquimbo Unido
12	GK	Emelie Borie	31 July 2006 (aged 16)	(Football Federation of Chile) Club Universidad de Chile
13	DF	Emma González	27 December 2006 (aged 15)	(Football Federation of Chile) Club Universidad de Chile
14	MF	Sabrina Clavijo	16 January 2005 (aged 17)	(Football Federation of Chile) Palestino
15	FW	Arantza Suazo	23 February 2006 (aged 16)	(Football Federation of Chile) Deportes La Serena
16	MF	Rachel Ramírez	9 May 2006 (aged 16)	(Football Federation of Chile) Colo-Colo
17	FW	Mariel Pastenes	25 April 2005 (aged 17)	(Football Federation of Chile) Palestino
18	FW	Daniela Acevedo	28 February 2006 (aged 16)	(Football Federation of Chile) Club Universidad de Chile
19	DF	Constanza Gutiérrez	10 February 2006 (aged 16)	(Football Federation of Chile) Palestino
20	DF	Martina Oses	21 June 2006 (aged 16)	(Football Federation of Chile) Fernández Vial
21	GK	Javiera Cárdenas	5 May 2005 (aged 17)	(Football Federation of Chile) Club Universidad de Chile

=== Germany ===
Head coach: Friederike Kromp

No.	Pos.	Player	Date of birth (age)	Club
1	GK	Eve Boettcher	25 January 2005 (aged 17)	(German Football Association) RB Leipzig
2	DF	Annaleen Böhler	18 July 2005 (aged 17)	(German Football Association) FC Bayern Munich
3	DF	Antonia Dehm	19 September 2005 (aged 17)	(German Football Association) FC Bayern Munich
4	DF	Emily Wallrabenstein	9 September 2006 (aged 16)	(German Football Association) Eintracht Frankfurt
5	DF	Jella Veit	3 May 2005 (aged 17)	(German Football Association) Eintracht Frankfurt
6	MF	Mathilde Janzen	14 February 2005 (aged 17)	(German Football Association) TSG Hoffenheim
7	FW	Mara Alber	6 September 2005 (aged 17)	(German Football Association) TSG Hoffenheim
8	MF	Paulina Platner	16 November 2005 (aged 16)	(German Football Association) Eintracht Frankfurt
9	FW	Marie Steiner	4 September 2005 (aged 17)	(German Football Association) TSG Hoffenheim
10	MF	Alara Şehitler	27 November 2006 (aged 15)	(German Football Association) FV Ravensburg
11	MF	Svea Stoldt	3 December 2005 (aged 16)	(German Football Association) Hamburger SV
12	GK	Lina Altenburg	23 March 2005 (aged 17)	(German Football Association) Eintracht Frankfurt
13	DF	Sandra Walbeck	5 March 2005 (aged 17)	(German Football Association) 1. FC Köln
14	DF	Marlene Deyß	26 March 2005 (aged 17)	(German Football Association) Hamburger SV
15	MF	Laila Portella	7 May 2007 (aged 15)	(German Football Association) FC Esslingen
16	MF	Lilith Schmidt	8 June 2006 (aged 16)	(German Football Association) 1. FC Köln
17	FW	Paulina Bartz	9 May 2005 (aged 17)	(German Football Association) Eimsbütteler TV
18	FW	Melina Krüger	5 January 2006 (aged 16)	(German Football Association) Magdeburger FFC
19	FW	Loreen Bender	21 August 2005 (aged 17)	(German Football Association) Eintracht Frankfurt
20	DF	Laura Gloning	5 June 2005 (aged 17)	(German Football Association) FC Bayern Munich
21	GK	Hannah Etzold	13 April 2005 (aged 17)	(German Football Association) Werder Bremen

=== New Zealand ===
Head coach: Leon Birnie

No.	Pos.	Player	Date of birth (age)	Club
1	GK	Aimee Feinberg-Danieli	11 February 2005 (aged 17)	(New Zealand Football) Auckland United FC
2	DF	Suya Hearing	3 July 2005 (aged 17)	(New Zealand Football) Northern Rovers
3	DF	Ella McMillan	20 March 2005 (aged 17)	(New Zealand Football) Wellington Phoenix FC
4	DF	Marie Green	12 January 2005 (aged 17)	(New Zealand Football) Ellerslie AFC
5	DF	Manaia Elliott	21 April 2005 (aged 17)	(New Zealand Football) Melville United AFC
6	MF	Charlotte Mortlock	9 March 2006 (aged 16)	(New Zealand Football) Cashmere Technical
7	FW	Ruby Nathan	11 October 2005 (aged 17)	(New Zealand Football) Auckland United FC
8	MF	Helena Errington	31 July 2005 (aged 17)	(New Zealand Football) Western Suburbs FC
9	FW	Emily Clegg	1 November 2005 (aged 16)	(New Zealand Football) Auckland United FC
10	MF	Olivia Ingham	9 November 2005 (aged 16)	(New Zealand Football) Wellington Phoenix FC
11	MF	Kiara Bercelli	23 February 2005 (aged 17)	(Football Australia) Alamein FC
12	FW	Alexis Cook	1 July 2005 (aged 17)	(New Zealand Football) Northern Rovers
13	MF	Lara Colpi	5 May 2005 (aged 17)	(New Zealand Football) Western Springs AFC
14	MF	Olivia Page	5 May 2005 (aged 17)	(New Zealand Football) Eastern Suburbs AFC
15	MF	Ella McCann	25 March 2005 (aged 17)	(New Zealand Football) FC Nelson
16	DF	Rebekah Trewhitt	13 December 2005 (aged 16)	(New Zealand Football) Palmerston North Marist FC
17	DF	Lara Smith	18 March 2006 (aged 16)	(New Zealand Football) Wellington United
18	GK	Madeleine Iro	24 October 2005 (aged 16)	(New Zealand Football) Cashmere Technical
19	MF	Zoe Benson	14 August 2006 (aged 16)	(New Zealand Football) Eastern Suburbs AFC
20	MF	Megan Simpson	1 September 2006 (aged 16)	(New Zealand Football) Nomads United
21	GK	Sophie Campbell	23 February 2007 (aged 15)	(New Zealand Football) New Plymouth Rangers

=== Nigeria ===
Head coach: Bankole Olowookere

No.	Pos.	Player	Date of birth (age)	Club
1	GK	Faith Omilana	1 December 2005 (aged 16)	(Nigeria Football Federation) Naija Ratels
2	DF	Omamuzo Edafe	2 February 2006 (aged 16)	(Nigeria Football Federation) Rivers Angels
3	DF	Miracle Usani	20 June 2007 (aged 15)	(Nigeria Football Federation) Abia Angels
4	MF	Mary Aderemi	7 November 2007 (aged 14)	(Nigeria Football Federation) Bayelsa Queens
5	DF	Tumininu Adeshina	22 April 2006 (aged 16)	(Nigeria Football Federation) Naija Ratels
6	DF	Shakirat Oyinlola	8 January 2006 (aged 16)	(Nigeria Football Federation) Naija Ratels
7	FW	Amina Bello	18 December 2005 (aged 16)	(Nigeria Football Federation) Naija Ratels
8	MF	Blessing Emmanuel	7 June 2006 (aged 16)	(Nigeria Football Federation) Naija Ratels
9	FW	Alvine Dah-Zossu	22 October 2005 (aged 16)	(Nigeria Football Federation) Osun Babes
10	MF	Taiwo Afolabi	2 March 2007 (aged 15)	(Nigeria Football Federation) Delta Queens
11	MF	Chidera Okenwa	12 December 2005 (aged 16)	(Nigeria Football Federation) Abia Angels
12	MF	Alima Attervall Alase	6 November 2006 (aged 15)	(Swedish Football Association) IFK Göteborg
13	DF	Comfort Folorunsho	26 January 2006 (aged 16)	(Nigeria Football Federation) Delta Queens
14	FW	Yetunde Ayantosho	7 November 2007 (aged 14)	(Nigeria Football Federation) Osun Babes
15	DF	Edet Offiong	25 December 2005 (aged 16)	(Nigeria Football Federation) Abia Angels
16	GK	Linda Jiwuaku	6 June 2006 (aged 16)	(Nigeria Football Federation) Confluence Queens
17	FW	Opeyemi Ajakaye	30 December 2005 (aged 16)	(Nigeria Football Federation) Robo Queens
18	MF	Bisola Mosaku	19 October 2006 (aged 15)	(Nigeria Football Federation) Prince Kazeem Eletu
19	DF	Blessing Sunday	15 October 2005 (aged 16)	(Nigeria Football Federation) Edo Queens
20	FW	Edidiong Etim	29 September 2007 (aged 15)	(Nigeria Football Federation) Bayelsa Queens
21	GK	Jessica Inyiama	7 December 2005 (aged 16)	(Nigeria Football Federation) Rivers Angels

== Group C ==
=== China ===
Head coach: Wang Anzhi

No.	Pos.	Player	Date of birth (age)	Club
1	GK	Liu Chen	30 June 2006 (aged 16)	(Chinese Football Association) Shandong JingHua
2	DF	Xu Zhiyi	21 November 2005 (aged 16)	(Chinese Football Association) Wuxi Sports
3	DF	Wang Yi	27 January 2006 (aged 16)	(Chinese Football Association) Changzhou Changti
4	DF	Huang Jiaxin	25 January 2006 (aged 16)	(Chinese Football Association) Shanghai FA
5	DF	Wu Yejia	11 January 2006 (aged 16)	(Chinese Football Association) Wuxi Sports
6	MF	Lu Jiayu	18 January 2006 (aged 16)	(Chinese Football Association) Shanghai FA
7	MF	Huo Yuexin	8 March 2005 (aged 17)	(Chinese Football Association) Jiangsu Jiangning
8	MF	Wang Aifang	15 January 2006 (aged 16)	(Chinese Football Association) Liaoning Baiye
9	FW	Yin Lihong	27 October 2005 (aged 16)	(Chinese Football Association) Shanghai Shengli
10	DF	Qiao Ruiqi	17 April 2005 (aged 17)	(Chinese Football Association) Jiangsu Jiangning
11	MF	Wang Licheng	7 January 2005 (aged 17)	(Chinese Football Association) Sichuan WFC
12	GK	Guo Xinyu	14 March 2006 (aged 16)	(Chinese Football Association) Jiangsu Jiangning
13	FW	Zhang Hongpin	28 June 2005 (aged 17)	(Chinese Football Association) Hebei WFC
14	DF	Zeng Yujia	7 July 2006 (aged 16)	(Chinese Football Association) Beijing Xiannongtan
15	MF	Yu Xingyue	24 December 2006 (aged 15)	(Chinese Football Association) Evergrande Football School
16	MF	Ge Yu	15 February 2006 (aged 16)	(Chinese Football Association) Jiangsu Jiangning
17	MF	Ouyang Yuhuan	21 March 2006 (aged 16)	(Chinese Football Association) Shenzhen FA
18	FW	Bao Cunxin	13 April 2006 (aged 16)	(Chinese Football Association) Shaanxi Province
19	MF	Sun Yajie	27 January 2005 (aged 17)	(Chinese Football Association) Shanghai FA
20	DF	Wang Mijia	20 February 2005 (aged 17)	(Chinese Football Association) Dalian Professional WFC
21	GK	Chen Mengqi	22 September 2005 (aged 17)	(Chinese Football Association) Tianjin Shengde

=== Colombia ===
Head coach: Carlos Paniagua

No.	Pos.	Player	Date of birth (age)	Club
1	GK	Luisa Agudelo	27 March 2007 (aged 15)	(Colombian Football Federation) Cortuluá
2	MF	Mary Espitaleta	22 August 2005 (aged 17)	(Colombian Football Federation) Formas Íntimas
3	DF	Cristina Motta	15 September 2005 (aged 17)	(Colombian Football Federation) Fortaleza C.E.I.F.
4	DF	María Correa	13 January 2005 (aged 17)	(Colombian Football Federation) Atlético Dos Quebradas
5	DF	Stefanía Perlaza	25 September 2005 (aged 17)	(Colombian Football Federation) Deportivo Cali
6	MF	Eliana Agudelo	19 February 2006 (aged 16)	(Colombian Football Federation) Mochi Fútbol Club
7	MF	Daniela Garavito	5 April 2005 (aged 17)	(Colombian Football Federation) Soccer Future
8	MF	Natalia Hernández	19 January 2005 (aged 17)	(Colombian Football Federation) Palmira
9	FW	Yésica Muñoz	27 April 2005 (aged 17)	(Colombian Football Federation) Formas Íntimas
10	MF	Gabriela Rodríguez	10 May 2005 (aged 17)	(Colombian Football Federation) América de Cali
11	FW	Linda Caicedo	22 February 2005 (aged 17)	(Colombian Football Federation) Deportivo Cali
12	GK	Jimena Domínguez	26 October 2006 (aged 15)	(Colombian Football Federation) Deportivo Cali
13	DF	Ana María Guzmán	11 June 2005 (aged 17)	(Colombian Football Federation) Atlético Dos Quebradas
14	DF	Fernanda Viáfara	22 July 2006 (aged 16)	(Colombian Football Federation) Independiente Santa Fe
15	DF	Dayanna Beltrán	3 March 2005 (aged 17)	(Colombian Football Federation) Fortaleza C.E.I.F.
16	MF	Juana Ortegón	6 August 2006 (aged 16)	(Colombian Football Federation) Deportivo Cali
17	MF	Sofía Patiño	17 January 2006 (aged 16)	(Colombian Football Federation) Atlético Dos Quebradas
18	FW	Orianna Quintero	20 December 2005 (aged 16)	(Colombian Football Federation) América de Cali
19	DF	Elsa Gómez	19 March 2006 (aged 16)	(Colombian Football Federation) Atlético Dos Quebradas
20	MF	Karla Viancha	8 November 2005 (aged 16)	(Colombian Football Federation) Club Besser
21	GK	Camila Chuquen	24 August 2005 (aged 17)	(Colombian Football Federation) Soccer Future

=== Mexico ===
Head coach: Ana Galindo

No.	Pos.	Player	Date of birth (age)	Club
1	GK	Carmen López	17 March 2005 (aged 17)	(United States Soccer Federation) DKSC
2	DF	Michel Fong	2 June 2006 (aged 16)	(Mexican Football Federation) Tijuana
3	DF	Ana Mendoza	8 July 2005 (aged 17)	(Mexican Football Federation) Pumas UNAM
4	DF	Natalia Colin	17 May 2005 (aged 17)	(Mexican Football Federation) Toluca
5	DF	Giselle Espinoza	8 March 2005 (aged 17)	(United States Soccer Federation) Concorde Fire
6	MF	Julie López	24 February 2005 (aged 17)	(United States Soccer Federation) LAFC SoCal
7	FW	Maribel Flores	8 January 2005 (aged 17)	(United States Soccer Federation) Slammers FC HB Køge
8	MF	Fátima Servín	17 May 2005 (aged 17)	(Mexican Football Federation) Monterrey
9	FW	Tatiana Flores	15 September 2005 (aged 17)	(The Football Association) Chelsea
10	MF	Alice Soto	26 March 2006 (aged 16)	(Mexican Football Federation) Pachuca
11	FW	Valerie Vargas	25 May 2005 (aged 17)	(United States Soccer Federation) Beach FC
12	GK	Renatta Cota	12 May 2005 (aged 17)	(Mexican Football Federation) América
13	DF	Lauren Omholt	3 February 2005 (aged 17)	(United States Soccer Federation) DKSC
14	DF	Daniela Meza	28 February 2005 (aged 17)	(Mexican Football Federation) Atlas
15	MF	Grecia Pineda	2 January 2005 (aged 17)	(Mexican Football Federation) Pumas UNAM
16	MF	Jade Martínez	27 August 2005 (aged 17)	(United States Soccer Federation) DKSC
17	FW	Layla Sirdah	14 September 2005 (aged 17)	(United States Soccer Federation) Tophat SC
18	DF	Katherin Guijarro	4 April 2005 (aged 17)	Free agent
19	FW	Montserrat Saldívar	20 September 2006 (aged 16)	(Mexican Football Federation) América
20	MF	Sofía Jiménez	9 March 2005 (aged 17)	(Mexican Football Federation) Puebla
21	GK	Camila Vázquez	17 July 2007 (aged 15)	(Mexican Football Federation) Atlas

=== Spain ===
Head coach: Kenio Gonzalo

No.	Pos.	Player	Date of birth (age)	Club
1	GK	Sofía Fuente	14 March 2005 (aged 17)	(Royal Spanish Football Federation) Real Madrid CF
2	DF	Judit Pujols	25 February 2005 (aged 17)	(Royal Spanish Football Federation) FC Barcelona
3	DF	Yolanda Sierra	17 January 2005 (aged 17)	(Royal Spanish Football Federation) Atlético de Madrid
4	DF	Noelia Correro	8 August 2005 (aged 17)	(Royal Spanish Football Federation) Real Madrid CF
5	DF	Sandra Villafañe	18 September 2005 (aged 17)	(Royal Spanish Football Federation) Madrid CFF
6	DF	Marina Artero	24 October 2005 (aged 16)	(Royal Spanish Football Federation) Athletic Club
7	FW	Lucía Corrales	24 November 2005 (aged 16)	(Royal Spanish Football Federation) FC Barcelona
8	MF	Olaya Enrique	10 May 2005 (aged 17)	(Royal Spanish Football Federation) Real Madrid CF
9	MF	Vicky López	26 July 2006 (aged 16)	(Royal Spanish Football Federation) FC Barcelona
10	FW	Carla Camacho	2 May 2005 (aged 17)	(Royal Spanish Football Federation) Real Madrid CF
11	FW	Jone Amezaga	2 January 2005 (aged 17)	(Royal Spanish Football Federation) Athletic Club
12	MF	Ainhoa Alguacil	8 January 2006 (aged 16)	(Royal Spanish Football Federation) Valencia CF
13	GK	Eunate Astralaga	30 November 2005 (aged 16)	(Royal Spanish Football Federation) Athletic Club
14	MF	Nina Pou	23 October 2005 (aged 16)	(Royal Spanish Football Federation) FC Barcelona
15	DF	Sara Ortega	20 February 2005 (aged 17)	(Royal Spanish Football Federation) Athletic Club
16	MF	Cristina Librán	11 January 2006 (aged 16)	(Royal Spanish Football Federation) Madrid CFF
17	MF	Marina Rivas	2 July 2005 (aged 17)	(Royal Spanish Football Federation) Madrid CFF
18	DF	Naara Miranda	28 March 2005 (aged 17)	(Royal Spanish Football Federation) CDE Racing Féminas
19	FW	Laia Martret	28 August 2005 (aged 17)	(Royal Spanish Football Federation) FC Barcelona
20	FW	Paula Partido	2 March 2005 (aged 17)	(Royal Spanish Football Federation) Real Madrid CF
21	GK	Jimena Vicario	7 June 2005 (aged 17)	(Royal Spanish Football Federation) CD Parquesol

== Group D ==
=== Canada ===
Head coach: (New Zealand) Emma Humphries

No.	Pos.	Player	Date of birth (age)	Club
1	GK	Coralie Lallier	26 May 2005 (aged 17)	(Canadian Soccer Association) NDC-CDN Québec
2	DF	Mya Archibald	31 March 2005 (aged 17)	(Canadian Soccer Association) NDC-CDN British Columbia
3	DF	Ella Ottey	12 August 2005 (aged 17)	(Canadian Soccer Association) NDC-CDN Ontario
4	MF	Isabel Monck	30 January 2005 (aged 17)	(United States Soccer Federation) University of Memphis
5	DF	Zoe Markesini	7 October 2005 (aged 17)	(Canadian Soccer Association) NDC-CDN Ontario
6	DF	Clare Logan	24 August 2005 (aged 17)	(Canadian Soccer Association) NDC-CDN British Columbia
7	FW	Amanda Allen	21 February 2005 (aged 17)	(Canadian Soccer Association) NDC-CDN Ontario
8	MF	Felicia Roy	7 April 2006 (aged 16)	(Canadian Soccer Association) NDC-CDN Québec
9	FW	Kayla Briggs	5 July 2005 (aged 17)	(Canadian Soccer Association) NDC-CDN Ontario
10	MF	Jeneva Hernandez Gray	5 October 2006 (aged 16)	(Canadian Soccer Association) NDC-CDN British Columbia
11	FW	Annabelle Chukwu	8 February 2007 (aged 15)	(Canadian Soccer Association) NDC-CDN Ontario
12	DF	Janet Okeke	1 March 2006 (aged 16)	(Canadian Soccer Association) NDC-CDN Québec
13	MF	Anna Hauer	2 October 2005 (aged 17)	(Canadian Soccer Association) NDC-CDN British Columbia
14	FW	Jade Bordeleau	8 February 2005 (aged 17)	(Canadian Soccer Association) NDC-CDN Québec
15	MF	Emily Wong	9 July 2007 (aged 15)	(Canadian Soccer Association) NDC-CDN British Columbia
16	MF	Ashley Roberts	11 March 2006 (aged 16)	(Canadian Soccer Association) NDC-CDN British Columbia
17	DF	Iba Oching	28 November 2006 (aged 15)	(Canadian Soccer Association) NDC-CDN British Columbia
18	GK	Noelle Henning	4 February 2007 (aged 15)	(Canadian Soccer Association) NDC-CDN Ontario
19	DF	Renee Watson	28 May 2005 (aged 17)	(Canadian Soccer Association) NDC-CDN Ontario
20	FW	Jaime Perrault	8 August 2006 (aged 16)	(Canadian Soccer Association) NDC-CDN British Columbia
21	GK	Faith Fenwick	4 February 2005 (aged 17)	(Canadian Soccer Association) NDC-CDN Ontario

=== France ===
Head coach: Cécile Locatelli

No.	Pos.	Player	Date of birth (age)	Club
1	GK	Féérine Belhadj	14 February 2005 (aged 17)	(French Football Federation) Olympique Lyonnais
2	DF	Taeryne Job	10 July 2006 (aged 16)	(French Football Federation) AS Saint-Étienne
3	MF	Louna Belhout-Achi	11 January 2005 (aged 17)	(French Football Federation) Olympique Lyonnais
4	DF	Lola Boisset	20 July 2005 (aged 17)	(French Football Federation) FC Nantes
5	DF	Alice Marques	4 May 2005 (aged 17)	(French Football Federation) Olympique Lyonnais
6	MF	Wassilah Pacaud	22 September 2005 (aged 17)	(French Football Federation) EA Guingamp
7	DF	Fiona Liaigre	5 January 2005 (aged 17)	(French Football Federation) Girondins de Bordeaux
8	MF	Charline Coutel	12 June 2006 (aged 16)	(French Football Federation) Olympique Lyonnais
9	FW	Lucie Calba	24 February 2005 (aged 17)	(French Football Federation) FC Metz
10	FW	Shana Chossenotte	14 February 2005 (aged 17)	(French Football Federation) Stade de Reims
11	FW	Louise Martineau	28 July 2005 (aged 17)	(French Football Federation) ESOF La Roche sur Yon
12	FW	Juliette Mossard	9 July 2005 (aged 17)	(French Football Federation) FC Nantes
13	DF	Tara Elimbi	9 June 2005 (aged 17)	(French Football Federation) Paris Saint Germain
14	FW	Imane Touriss	11 February 2005 (aged 17)	(French Football Federation) EA Guingamp
15	MF	Jeanne Dumets	9 January 2005 (aged 17)	(French Football Federation) Le Havre AC
16	GK	Lisa Lebrun	24 June 2005 (aged 17)	(French Football Federation) FC Nantes
17	MF	Assa Sidibé	10 August 2005 (aged 17)	(French Football Federation) Paris FC
18	DF	Agathe Felden	21 December 2006 (aged 15)	(French Football Federation) FCE Mérignac Arlac
19	MF	Mélinda Mendy	21 December 2006 (aged 15)	(French Football Federation) Le Havre AC
20	MF	Fanny Rossi	8 November 2005 (aged 16)	(French Football Federation) Paris Saint Germain
21	GK	Julie Tissino	13 April 2005 (aged 17)	(French Football Federation) Grenoble Foot 38

=== Japan ===
Head coach: Michihisa Kano

No.	Pos.	Player	Date of birth (age)	Club
1	GK	Uruha Iwasaki	13 March 2006 (aged 16)	(Japan Football Association) Nojima Stella
2	FW	Uno Shiragaki	11 October 2005 (aged 17)	(Japan Football Association) Cerezo Osaka
3	DF	Raika Okamura	30 July 2005 (aged 17)	(Japan Football Association) Urawa Reds
4	DF	Sayami Kusunoki	26 April 2005 (aged 17)	(Japan Football Association) Cerezo Osaka
5	DF	Sakura Oya	18 March 2005 (aged 17)	(Japan Football Association) Nojima Stella
6	DF	Kokoro Yoshioka	7 July 2005 (aged 17)	(Japan Football Association) JFA Academy Fukushima
7	MF	Maho Konno	20 December 2005 (aged 16)	(Japan Football Association) Urawa Reds
8	MF	Miharu Shinjo	5 February 2007 (aged 15)	(Japan Football Association) Tokyo Verdy
9	FW	Moka Hiwatari	9 October 2005 (aged 17)	(Japan Football Association) Tokyo Verdy
10	MF	Hitomi Shibata	23 November 2005 (aged 16)	(Japan Football Association) Nojima Stella
11	MF	Miyu Matsunaga	30 August 2006 (aged 16)	(Japan Football Association) Tokyo Verdy
12	FW	Mao Itamura	6 August 2006 (aged 16)	(Japan Football Association) JFA Academy Fukushima
13	FW	Ai Tsujisawa	1 December 2005 (aged 16)	(Japan Football Association) Fujieda Junshin High School
14	MF	Momoko Tanikawa	7 May 2005 (aged 17)	(Japan Football Association) JFA Academy Fukushima
15	FW	Mio Takaoka	21 September 2005 (aged 17)	(Japan Football Association) Fujieda Junshin High School
16	DF	Rina Nakatani	27 April 2005 (aged 17)	(Japan Football Association) Cerezo Osaka
17	DF	Tōko Koga	6 January 2006 (aged 16)	(Japan Football Association) JFA Academy Fukushima
18	GK	Akari Kashima	7 July 2005 (aged 17)	(Japan Football Association) JFA Academy Fukushima
19	MF	Mao Kubota	30 May 2005 (aged 17)	(Japan Football Association) Fujieda Junshin High School
20	MF	Yuna Marui	30 August 2005 (aged 17)	(Japan Football Association) Cerezo Osaka
21	GK	Jessica Yuri Wulf	20 May 2005 (aged 17)	(Japan Football Association) Tokyo Verdy

=== Tanzania ===
Head coach: Bakari Shime

No.	Pos.	Player	Date of birth (age)	Club
1	GK	Husna Mtunda	31 May 2005 (aged 17)	(Tanzania Football Federation) Yanga Princess
2	DF	Noela Luhala	25 December 2005 (aged 16)	(Tanzania Football Federation) Yanga Princess
3	MF	Hasnath Ubamba	8 July 2006 (aged 16)	(Tanzania Football Federation) Fountain Gate
4	FW	Husna Mpanja	26 January 2006 (aged 16)	(Tanzania Football Federation) Tiger Queens
5	DF	Koku Kipanga	20 November 2005 (aged 16)	(Tanzania Football Federation) Simba Queens
6	MF	Joyce Lema	15 October 2006 (aged 15)	(Tanzania Football Federation) Fountain Gate
7	FW	Veronica Mapunda	27 August 2006 (aged 16)	(Tanzania Football Federation) Mlandizi Queens
8	FW	Shehati Mohamedi	2 October 2005 (aged 17)	(Tanzania Football Federation) Mlandizi Queens
9	MF	Aisha Mnunka	26 July 2005 (aged 17)	(Tanzania Football Federation) Simba Queens
10	FW	Zainabu Ally	1 November 2006 (aged 15)	(Tanzania Football Federation) Baobab Queens
11	DF	Dotto Evarist	16 July 2005 (aged 17)	(Tanzania Football Federation) Simba Queens
12	DF	Diana Mnally	11 September 2006 (aged 16)	(Tanzania Football Federation) Fountain Gate
13	MF	Fikiri Salum	1 September 2006 (aged 16)	(Tanzania Football Federation) Alliance Girls
14	FW	Rehema Mohamed	17 July 2005 (aged 17)	(Tanzania Football Federation) Mlandizi Queens
15	DF	Florentina Novatus	28 December 2006 (aged 15)	(Tanzania Football Federation) Baobab Queens
16	FW	Neema Kinega	19 February 2006 (aged 16)	(Tanzania Football Federation) Fountain Gate
17	DF	Christer Bahera	17 November 2005 (aged 16)	(Tanzania Football Federation) Fountain Gate
18	GK	Zulfa Makau	29 September 2006 (aged 16)	(Tanzania Football Federation) Yanga Princess
19	MF	Rahma Salim	13 January 2006 (aged 16)	(Tanzania Football Federation) Baobab Queens
20	GK	Audax Rwehumbiza	22 January 2007 (aged 15)	(Tanzania Football Federation) Mwenge Academy
21	DF	Violeth Mwamakamba	9 February 2005 (aged 17)	(Tanzania Football Federation) Simba Queens
