= 2024 in Japanese football =

Football in Japan
- Season: 2024

Men's football
- J1 League: Vissel Kobe
- J2 League: Shimizu S-Pulse
- J3 League: Omiya Ardija
- JFL: Tochigi City FC
- Emperor's Cup: Vissel Kobe
- JL Cup: Nagoya Grampus
- Super Cup: Kawasaki Frontale

Women's football
- Nadeshiko Division 1: Viamaterras Miyazaki
- Nadeshiko Division 2: Okayama Yunogo Belle

This article summarizes Japanese football in the 2024 season.

== National teams ==
=== Men's ===
==== Senior ====
5 September FIFA World Cup qualification 3R	Japan	7–0	China	Saitama, Japan
19:35 UTC+9	Endō 12'; Mitoma 45+2'; Minamino 52', 58'; Itō 77'; Maeda 87'; Kubo 90+5'	Report		Stadium: Saitama Stadium 2002; Attendance: 52,398; Referee: Abdulrahman Al-Jassim (Qatar)

10 September FIFA World Cup qualification 3R	Bahrain	0–5	Japan	Riffa, Bahrain
19:00 UTC+3		Report	Ueda 37' (pen.), 47'; Morita 61', 64'; Ogawa 81'	Stadium: Bahrain National Stadium; Attendance: 22,729; Referee: Rustam Lutfullin (Uzbekistan)

10 October FIFA World Cup qualification 3R	Saudi Arabia	0–2	Japan	Jeddah, Saudi Arabia
21:00 UTC+3		Report	Kamada 14'; Ogawa 81'	Stadium: King Abdullah Sports City Stadium; Attendance: 56,283; Referee: Kim Jong-hyeok (South Korea)

15 October FIFA World Cup qualification 3R	Japan	1–1	Australia	Saitama, Japan
19:35 UTC+9	Burgess 76' (o.g.)	Report	Taniguchi 58' (o.g.)	Stadium: Saitama Stadium 2002; Attendance: 58,730; Referee: Ahmed Al-Ali (Kuwait)

15 November FIFA World Cup qualification 3R	Indonesia	0–4	Japan	Jakarta, Indonesia
19:00 UTC+7		Report	Hubner 36' (o.g.); Minamino 40'; Morita 49'; Sugawara 69'	Stadium: Gelora Bung Karno Stadium; Attendance: 60,304; Referee: Mooud Bonyadifard (Iran)

19 November FIFA World Cup qualification 3R	China	1–3	Japan	Xiamen, China
20:00 UTC+8	Lin Liangming 48'	Report	Ogawa 39', 54'; Itakura 45+6'	Stadium: Xiamen Egret Stadium; Attendance: 45,336; Referee: Muhammad Taqi (Singapore)

- Fixtures & Results (2024), JFA.jp

==== U-23 ====
24 July 2024 Summer Olympic GS	Japan	5–0	Paraguay	Bordeaux, France
19:00 UTC+2	Mito 19', 63'; Yamamoto 69'; Fujio 81', 87'	Report		Stadium: Stade de Bordeaux; Attendance: 14,000; Referee: François Letexier (France)

27 July 2024 Summer Olympic GS	Japan	1–0	Mali	Bordeaux, France
21:00 UTC+2	Yamamoto 82'	Report		Stadium: Stade de Bordeaux; Referee: Edina Alves Batista (Brazil)

30 July 2024 Summer Olympic GS	Israel	0–1	Japan	Nantes, France
21:00 UTC+2		Report	Hosoya 90+1'	Stadium: Stade de la Beaujoire; Referee: Saíd Martínez (Honduras)

2 August 2024 Summer Olympic QF	Japan	0–3	Spain	Décines-Charpieu, France
17:00 UTC+2		Report	F. López 11', 73'; Ruiz 86'	Stadium: Stade de Lyon; Referee: Dahane Beida (Mauritania)

- Fixtures & Results (2024)

==== U-19 ====
25 September 2025 AFC U-20 Asian Cup qualification	Japan	2–0	Turkmenistan	Bishkek, Kyrgyzstan
15:00 UTC+6	Kanda 22', 48'	Report		Stadium: Dolen Omurzakov Stadium; Attendance: 254; Referee: Jansen Foo (Singapore)

27 September 2025 AFC U-20 Asian Cup qualification	Myanmar	0–6	Japan	Bishkek, Kyrgyzstan
15:00 UTC+6			Hiroi 25', 64'; Nakagawa 32', 82', 83'; Nishihara 45'	Stadium: Dolen Omurzakov Stadium; Attendance: 253; Referee: Morteza Mansourian (Iran)

29 September 2025 AFC U-20 Asian Cup qualification	Japan	1–1	Kyrgyzstan	Bishkek, Kyrgyzstan
20:00 UTC+6	Kanda 50'		Madanov 47'	Stadium: Dolen Omurzakov Stadium; Referee: Nivon Robesh (Sri Lanka)

13 November Friendly	U-19 Pumas UNAM (Mexico)	0–0	Japan	Mexico City, Mexico
11:00 UTC−6		Report		Stadium: Club Universidad Nacional Ground

16 November Friendly	Mexico	1–1 (1–2 p)	Japan	Mexico City, Mexico
10:00 UTC−6	Moreno 3'	Report	Yasuda 51'	Stadium: Centro de Alto Rendimiento

19 November Friendly	Venezuela	1–3	Japan	Mexico City, Mexico
13:00 UTC−6	Perez 70'	Report	Ikeda 10'; Kida 67'; Saito 73'	Stadium: Centro de Alto Rendimiento

- Fixtures & Results (U-19 2024), JFA.jp

==== U-18 ====
22 August SBS Cup	Japan	0–0	South Korea	Shizuoka
19:52 UTC+9		Report		Stadium: Kusanagi Athletic Stadium

23 August SBS Cup	Shizuoka U-18 Selection (Japan)	0–0 (3–5 p)	Japan	Numazu
18:50 UTC+9		Report		Stadium: Ashitaka Park Stadium

25 August SBS Cup	Japan	0–0 (7–6 p)	Argentina	Fukuroi
16:00 UTC+9		Report		Stadium: Ecopa Stadium

9 October Friendly	Japan	0–1	Sweden	Oliva
15:00 UTC+2		Report	Samuyiwa 9'	Stadium: Oliva Nova Sports Center

13 October Friendly	Sweden	1–4	Japan	Oliva
15:00 UTC+2	Jawla 41'	Report	Kawamura 6'; Yamaguchi 15', 22', 58'	Stadium: Oliva Nova Sports Center

15 October Friendly	United States	3–2	Japan	Oliva
12:00 UTC+2	Joyner 16'; Miller 43'; Klapija 54'	Report	Shimamoto 56'; Nawata 79'	Stadium: Oliva Nova Sports Center

- Fixtures & Results (U-18 2024), JFA.jp

==== U-17 ====
8 August Balcom BWM Cup	Sanfrecce Hiroshima U-18 (Japan)	1–2	Japan	Hiroshima
18:00 UTC+9	Shimon Kobayashi 15'	Report	Kanshiro Suemune 26'; Shungo Sugiura 61'	Stadium: Hot Staff Field Hiroshima

10 August Balcom BWM Cup	Hiroshima High School Selection (Japan)	0–2	Japan	Hiroshima
18:00 UTC+9		Report	Shuto Oishi 44'; Yuji Doi 59'	Stadium: Hiroshima Regional Park No.1 Ball Game Stadium

11 August Balcom BWM Cup	Japan	3–1	Uzbekistan	Hiroshima
14:30 UTC+9	Naru Nakatsumi 3', 24'; Muku Fukuta 28'	Report	Diyor Ermanov 49'	Stadium: Hiroshima Regional Park No.1 Ball Game Stadium

12 September IYS in Niigata	Japan	3–0	Peru	Shibata
15:00 UTC+9	Kantaro Maeda 48'; Ryuki Osa 49'; Kio Tanaka 64'	Gekisaka; JFA.en		Stadium: Green Stadium Shibata

14 September IYS in Niigata	Japan	4–3	United States	Shibata
15:00 UTC+9	Kio Tanaka 50', 67'; Ryuki Osa 54'; Ritsu Onishi 69'	Gekisaka; JFA.en	Aiden Hezarkani 49'; Andrew Baiera 64'; ? 90+3'	Stadium: Green Stadium Shibata

16 September IYS in Niigata	Niigata U-18 Selection (Japan)	3–3	Japan	Niigata
15:00 UTC+9	Shuto Imoto 29'; So Watanabe 54'; Kento Inaba 87'	Gekisaka; JFA.en	Ritsu Onishi 7'; Kio Tanaka 44'; Yusei Shima 62'	Stadium: Denka Big Swan Stadium

13 November Friendly	Republic of Ireland	0–2	Japan	Poreč, Croatia
12:00 UTC+1		Report	Kento Hamasaki 10'; Shion Nakayama 23'	Stadium: Sports Center Zelena Laguna

16 November Friendly	Portugal	3–1	Japan	Poreč, Croatia
12:00 UTC+1	Goal 9', 18', 68'	Report	Haruto Tatsukawa 26'	Stadium: Sports Center Zelena Laguna

18 November Friendly	Croatia	1–2	Japan	Poreč, Croatia
12:00 UTC+1	Goal 46'	Report	Yusei Shima 59'; Haruto Tatsukawa 80'	Stadium: Sports Center Zelena Laguna

- Fixtures & Results (U-17 2024), JFA.jp

==== U-16 ====
16 August CFA Peace Cup	Japan	1–1	Uzbekistan	Shenyang. China
19:35 UTC+8				Stadium: Shenyang Olympic Sports Centre Stadium

18 August CFA Peace Cup	China	1–2	Japan	Shenyang. China
19:35 UTC+8				Stadium: Shenyang Olympic Sports Centre Stadium

20 August CFA Peace Cup	Japan	0–1	Vietnam	Shenyang. China
--:-- UTC+8				Stadium: Shenyang Olympic Sports Centre Stadium

23 October 2025 AFC U-17 Asian Cup qualification	Japan	9–2	Nepal	Doha, Qatar
20:30 UTC+3	Daichi Tani 17', 38', 43', 61'; Hiroto Asada 19', 45+2', 64'; Mibuki Kasai 73'; Kaiji Chonan 77'	Report	Sabin Kumar 12'; Bigyan Khadka 88'	Stadium: Hamad bin Khalifa Stadium; Referee: Phurpa Wangchuk (Bhutan)

25 October 2025 AFC U-17 Asian Cup qualification	Mongolia	0–7	Japan	Doha, Qatar
20:30 UTC+3			Hyoei Kawabata 10', 47'; Batmend Baasanjav 41' (o.g.); Mibuki Kasai 56'; Hiroto Asada 74', 88'; Daichi Tani 84'	Stadium: Hamad bin Khalifa Stadium; Referee: Ahmed Imam (Kuwait)

27 October 2025 AFC U-17 Asian Cup qualification	Japan	5–0	Qatar	Doha, Qatar
20:30 UTC+3	Kosuke Imai 17'; Daichi Tani 51'; Seifeldin Hassanein 57' (o.g.); Taiga Seguchi 72'; Hiroto Asada 87'			Stadium: Aspire Academy Pitch 7 Referee: Sanzhar Zhakypbekov (Kyrgyzstan)

12 December Friendly	Spain	5–1	Japan	Alicante, Spain
11:00 UTC+1	Goal 3', 39', 57', 60', 71'	Report	Minato Yoshida 25'	Stadium: Albir Garden Resort

14 December Friendly	Spain	2–2	Japan	Alicante, Spain
11:00 UTC+1	Goal 47', 73'	Report	Raiki Anzai 5'; Yuito Kamo 19'	Stadium: Albir Garden Resort

17 December Friendly	Valencia (Spain)	2–1	Japan	Paterna, Spain
12:00 UTC+1	Goal 87', 88'	Report	Yuito Kamo 33'	Stadium: Ciudad Deportiva de Paterna

- Fixtures & Results (U-16 2024), JFA.jp

==== U-15 ====
29 October Val de Marne Tournament	Italy	1–0	Japan	Limeil-Brévannes, France
14:00 UTC+2	? 21'	Report		Stadium: Didier Pironi Sports Complex

31 October Val de Marne Tournament	France	3–2	Japan	Le Plessis-Trévise, France
16:00 UTC+2	?; ?; ?	Report	? 47' (o.g.); Eito Takaki 76'	Stadium: Philippe Deuleveult Sports Complex

2 November Val de Marne Tournament	Switzerland	1–3	Japan	Toulon, France
14:00 UTC+2	? 22'	Report	Eito Takaki 33', 80+2'; Chimezie Kai Ezemuokwe 80+4'	Stadium: Léo Lagrange Sports Complex

- Fixtures & Results (U-15 2024), JFA.jp

==== Futsal ====
3 February Friendly	Portugal	4–1	Japan	Porto, Portugal
20:00 UTC+0				Stadium: Centro de Desportos e Congressos de Matosinhos

5 February Friendly	Portugal	2–1	Japan	Porto, Portugal
20:00 UTC+0				Stadium: Centro de Desportos e Congressos de Matosinhos

18 April 2024 AFC Futsal Asian Cup	Japan	2–3	Kyrgyzstan	Bangkok, Thailand
				Stadium: Bangkok Arena

20 April 2024 AFC Futsal Asian Cup	South Korea	0–5	Japan	Bangkok, Thailand
				Stadium: Bangkok Arena

22 April 2024 AFC Futsal Asian Cup	Japan	1–1	Tajikistan	Bangkok, Thailand
				Stadium: Bangkok Arena

- Fixtures & Results (2024), JFA.jp

=== Women's ===
==== Senior ====
13 July MS&AD Cup	Japan	4–0	Ghana	Kanazawa, Japan
15:20 UTC+9	Tanaka 51'; Hamano 65'; Fujino 67'; Ueki 80'	Report (JFA)		Stadium: Kanazawa Go Go Curry Stadium; Attendance: 9,648; Referee: Oh Hyeon-jeong (Korea)

19 July Unofficial friendly	Japan	1–1	Colombia	Le Touquet, France
			Ramírez

25 July Olympic Games GS	Spain	2–1	Japan	Nantes, France
17:00 UTC+2	Bonmatí 22'; Caldentey 74'	Report	Fujino 13'	Stadium: Stade de la Beaujoire; Attendance: 10,377

28 July Olympic Games GS	Brazil	1–2	Japan	Paris, France
17:00 UTC+2	Jheniffer 56'	Report	Kumagai 90+2' (pen.); Tanikawa 90+6'	Stadium: Parc de Princes; Attendance: 40,918

31 July Olympic Games GS	Japan	3–1	Nigeria	Nantes, France
17:00 UTC+2	Hamano 22'; Tanaka 32'; Kitagawa 45+5'	Report	Echegini 42'	Stadium: Stade de la Beaujoire; Attendance: 6,480; Referee: Emikar Calderas (Venezuela

3 August Olympic Games QF	United States	1–0 (a.e.t.)	Japan	Paris, France
15:00 UTC+2	Rodman 105+2'	Report		Stadium: Parc de Princes; Attendance: 43,004; Referee: Tess Olofsson (Sweden)

26 October Mizuho Blue Dream Match	Japan	4–0	South Korea	Tokyo, Japan
14:20 UTC+9	Kitagawa 33'; Fujino 34'; Tanaka 37'; Tanikawa 56'	Report (JFA); Report (KFA)		Stadium: Japan National Stadium; Attendance: 12,420

- Fixtures & Results (2024), JFA.jp

==== U-20 ====
4 March 2024 AFC U-20 Asian Cup Group B	Japan	10–0	Vietnam	JAR Stadium, Tashkent
16:00	Matsukubo 11', 31', 44'; Hijikata 57', 64'; Tsujisawa 67'; Sasaki 70'; Sasai 73'; Yoneda 83'; Shirasawa 84'	Report		Attendance: 60; Referee: Kim Yu-jeong (South Korea)

7 March 2024 AFC U-20 Asian Cup Group B	China	0–2	Japan	JAR Stadium, Tashkent
16:00		Report	Hijikata 26'; Amano 88'	Attendance: 85; Referee: Kim Yu-jeong (South Korea)

10 March 2024 AFC U-20 Asian Cup Group B	Japan	0–1	North Korea	JAR Stadium, Tashkent
13:00		Report	Chae Un-yong 22'	Attendance: 70; Referee: Choki Om (Bhutan)

13 March 2024 AFC U-20 Asian Cup SF	Australia	1–5	Japan	JAR Stadium, Tashkent
16:00	Trimis 13'	Report	Yoneda 3'; Shiragaki 63'; Hijikata 83'; Sasai 88'; Chinnama 89' (o.g.)	Attendance: 88; Referee: Dong Fangyu (China)

16 March 2024 AFC U-20 Asian Cup F	Japan	1–2	North Korea	JAR Stadium, Tashkent
18:00	Tsujisawa 20'		Jon Ryong-yong 44', 86'	Referee: Dong Fangyu (China)

29 May 2024 Sud Ladies Cup Group A	Colombia	1–2	Japan	Parc des Sports, Avignon
	N. Hernández 61'		Kashimura 48'; Sasaki 73'

1 June 2024 Sud Ladies Cup Group A	Japan	0–3	Mexico	Parc des Sports, Avignon
			Vargas 34'; Saldívar 46'; Soto 79'

4 June 2024 Sud Ladies Cup 3rd place	Japan	4–2	Morocco	Parc des Sports, Avignon
	Hijikata 19'; Itamura 33'; Koyama 48'; Okamura 58'		Boussate 45+7'; El Ghazouani 51'

2 September 2024 FIFA U-20 World Cup Group E	Japan	7–0	New Zealand	Estadio El Techo, Bogotá
20:00	Hijikata 16', 38'; Sasai 41', 90+1'; Oyama 45'; Koyama 60'; Hayama 75'	Report		Referee: Dione Rissios (Chile)

5 September 2024 FIFA U-20 World Cup Group E	Japan	4–1	Ghana	Estadio El Techo, Bogotá
17:00	Sasai 45'; Matsukubo 45+6'; Hayama 50'; Matsunaga 90'	Report	Nyamekye 83' (pen.)	Referee: Karen Hernández (Mexico)

8 September 2024 FIFA U-20 World Cup Group E	Austria	0–2	Japan	Estadio El Techo, Bogotá
18:00		Report	Hijikata 38', 79'	Referee: Shahenda El-Maghrabi (Egypt)

12 September 2024 FIFA U-20 World Cup R16	Japan	2–1	Nigeria	Estadio El Techo, Bogotá
20:00	Matsunaga 33'; Hijikata 65'	Report	Shobowale 90+1'	Referee: Natalie Simon (United States)

15 September 2024 FIFA U-20 World Cup QF	Japan	1–0 (a.e.t.)	Spain	Estadio Atanasio Girardot, Medellín
18:00	Yoneda 102'	Report		Attendance: 4,583; Referee: Anahí Fernández (Uruguay)

18 September 2024 FIFA U-20 World Cup SF	Japan	2–0	Netherlands	Estadio Pascual Guerrero, Cali
20:00	Matsukubo 55', 83'	Report		Attendance: 8,733; Referee: Karen Hernández (Mexico)

22 September 2024 FIFA U-20 World Cup F	North Korea	1–0	Japan	Estadio El Campín, Bogotá
16:00 COT	Choe Il-son 15'	Report		Attendance: 32,908; Referee: Maria Sole Ferrieri (Italy)

- Fixtures & Results (2024), JFA.jp

==== U-17 ====
7 May 2024 AFC U-17 Asian Cup GS	Japan	4–0	Thailand	Gianyar
16:00 UTC+8	Shinjo 51'; Sakaki 65'; Tsuda 69', 87'	Report		Stadium: Kapten I Wayan Dipta Stadium; Referee: Mahsa Ghorbani (Iran)

10 May 2024 AFC U-17 Asian Cup GS	Australia	1–4	Japan	Gianyar
19:00 UTC+8	Dos Santos 90+6'	Report	Sato 3', 10'; Shinjo 65'; Hirakawa 80'	Stadium: Kapten I Wayan Dipta Stadium; Referee: Yang Shu-ting (Chinese Taipei)

13 May 2024 AFC U-17 Asian Cup GS	Japan	4–0	China	Gianyar
16:00 UTC+8	Fukushima 9'; Kikuchi 74', 86'; Nezu 90+5'	Report		Stadium: Kapten I Wayan Dipta Stadium; Referee: Cha Min-ji (South Korea)

16 May 2024 AFC U-17 Asian Cup SF	Japan	3–0	South Korea	Gianyar
15:00 UTC+8	Nezu 40'; Shinjo 68', 88'	Report		Stadium: Kapten I Wayan Dipta Stadium; Referee: Rebecca Durcau (Australia)

19 May 2024 AFC U-17 Asian Cup Final	North Korea	1–0	Japan	Gianyar
19:00 UTC+8	Jon Il-chong 46'	Report		Stadium: Kapten I Wayan Dipta Stadium; Attendance: 1,325; Referee: Veronika Bernatskaia (Kyrgyzstan)

17 October 2024 FIFA U-17 World Cup GS	Japan	v	Poland	Estadio Félix Sánchez, Santo Domingo
16:00		Report

20 October 2024 FIFA U-17 World Cup GS	Japan	v	Brazil	Estadio Félix Sánchez, Santo Domingo
16:00		Report

23 October 2024 FIFA U-17 World Cup GS	Zambia	v	Japan	Estadio Félix Sánchez, Santo Domingo
16:00		Report

- Fixtures & Results (2024), JFA.jp

== Club competitions ==
=== League (men) ===
==== Promotion and relegation ====
League	Promoted to league	Relegated from league
J1 League	Machida Zelvia ▲; Júbilo Iwata ▲; Tokyo Verdy ▲	Yokohama FC ▼
J2 League	Ehime FC ▲; Kagoshima United ▲	Omiya Ardija ▼; Zweigen Kanazawa ▼
J3 League	No promotion	No relegation
Japan Football League	Tochigi City FC ▲	No relegation

==== J.League ====
===== J1 League =====
Pos	Team	Pld	W	D	L	GF	GA	GD	Pts	Qualification or relegation
1	Vissel Kobe (C)	38	21	9	8	61	36	+25	72	Qualification for the AFC Champions League Elite league stage (Note: Since the winners of the 2024 Emperor's Cup, Vissel Kobe, had already qualified for the Champions League Elite, the spot given to the Emperor's Cup winners (Champions League Elite) was passed to the third-placed team. Consequently, the spot given to the third-placed team (Champions League Two) was passed to the fourth-placed team.)
2	Sanfrecce Hiroshima	38	19	11	8	72	43	+29	68	Qualification for the AFC Champions League Elite league stage
3	Machida Zelvia	38	19	9	10	54	34	+20	66	Qualification for the AFC Champions League Elite league stage
4	Gamba Osaka	38	18	12	8	49	35	+14	66	Qualification for the AFC Champions League Two group stage
5	Kashima Antlers	38	18	11	9	60	41	+19	65	
6	Tokyo Verdy	38	14	14	10	51	51	0	56	
7	FC Tokyo	38	15	9	14	53	51	+2	54	
8	Kawasaki Frontale	38	13	13	12	66	57	+9	52	
9	Yokohama F. Marinos	38	15	7	16	61	62	−1	52	
10	Cerezo Osaka	38	13	13	12	43	48	−5	52	
11	Nagoya Grampus	38	15	5	18	44	47	−3	50	
12	Avispa Fukuoka	38	12	14	12	33	38	−5	50	
13	Urawa Red Diamonds	38	12	12	14	49	45	+4	48	
14	Kyoto Sanga	38	12	11	15	43	55	−12	47	
15	Shonan Bellmare	38	12	9	17	53	58	−5	45	
16	Albirex Niigata	38	10	12	16	44	59	−15	42	
17	Kashiwa Reysol	38	9	14	15	39	51	−12	41	
18	Júbilo Iwata (R)	38	10	8	20	47	68	−21	38	Relegation to the J2 League
19	Hokkaido Consadole Sapporo (R)	38	9	10	19	43	66	−23	37	Relegation to the J2 League
20	Sagan Tosu (R)	38	10	5	23	48	68	−20	35	Relegation to the J2 League

Source: J1 League, J.League Data Site
Rules for classification: 1) Points; 2) Goal difference; 3) Goals scored; 4) Head-to-head points; 5) Head-to-head goal difference; 6) Head-to-head goals scored; 7) Fewer disciplinary points.
(C) Champions; (R) Relegated

===== J2 League =====
Pos	Team	Pld	W	D	L	GF	GA	GD	Pts	Promotion or relegation
1	Shimizu S-Pulse (C, P)	38	26	4	8	68	38	+30	82	Promotion to the 2025 J1 League
2	Yokohama FC (P)	38	22	10	6	60	27	+33	76	Promotion to the 2025 J1 League
3	V-Varen Nagasaki	38	21	12	5	74	39	+35	75	Qualification for the promotion play-offs
4	Montedio Yamagata	38	20	6	12	55	36	+19	66	Qualification for the promotion play-offs
5	Fagiano Okayama (O, P)	38	17	14	7	48	29	+19	65	Qualification for the promotion play-offs
6	Vegalta Sendai	38	18	10	10	50	44	+6	64	Qualification for the promotion play-offs
7	JEF United Chiba	38	19	4	15	67	48	+19	61	
8	Tokushima Vortis	38	16	7	15	42	44	−2	55	
9	Iwaki FC	38	15	9	14	53	41	+12	54	
10	Blaublitz Akita	38	15	9	14	36	35	+1	54	
11	Renofa Yamaguchi	38	15	8	15	43	44	−1	53	
12	Roasso Kumamoto	38	13	7	18	53	62	−9	46	
13	Fujieda MYFC	38	14	4	20	38	57	−19	46	
14	Ventforet Kofu	38	12	9	17	54	57	−3	45	
15	Mito HollyHock	38	11	11	16	39	51	−12	44	
16	Oita Trinita	38	10	13	15	33	47	−14	43	
17	Ehime FC	38	10	10	18	41	69	−28	40	
18	Tochigi SC (R)	38	7	13	18	33	57	−24	34	Relegation to the 2025 J3 League
19	Kagoshima United (R)	38	7	9	22	35	59	−24	30	Relegation to the 2025 J3 League
20	Thespa Gunma (R)	38	3	9	26	24	62	−38	18	Relegation to the 2025 J3 League

Source: Meiji Yasuda J2 League, J.League Data Site
Rules for classification: 1) Points; 2) Goal difference; 3) Goals scored; 4) Head-to-head points; 5) Head-to-head goal difference; 6) Head-to-head goal scored; 7) Fair-play points.
(C) Champions; (O) Play-off winners; (P) Promoted; (R) Relegated

===== J3 League =====
Pos	Team	Pld	W	D	L	GF	GA	GD	Pts	Promotion or relegation
1	Omiya Ardija (C, P)	38	25	10	3	72	32	+40	85	Promotion to the 2025 J2 League
2	FC Imabari (P)	38	22	7	9	62	38	+24	73	Promotion to the 2025 J2 League
3	Kataller Toyama (O, P)	38	16	16	6	54	36	+18	64	Qualification for the promotion play-offs
4	Matsumoto Yamaga	38	16	12	10	61	45	+16	60	Qualification for the promotion play-offs
5	Fukushima United	38	18	5	15	64	49	+15	59	Qualification for the promotion play-offs
6	FC Osaka	38	15	13	10	43	31	+12	58	Qualification for the promotion play-offs
7	Giravanz Kitakyushu	38	15	11	12	41	39	+2	56	
8	FC Gifu	38	15	8	15	64	56	+8	53	
9	SC Sagamihara	38	14	11	13	41	41	0	53	
10	Azul Claro Numazu	38	15	7	16	53	46	+7	52	
11	Vanraure Hachinohe	38	13	13	12	44	42	+2	52	
12	Zweigen Kanazawa	38	13	11	14	50	52	−2	50	
13	Gainare Tottori	38	14	8	16	49	65	−16	50	
14	FC Ryukyu	38	12	11	15	45	54	−9	47	
15	Tegevajaro Miyazaki	38	12	10	16	46	50	−4	46	
16	Kamatamare Sanuki	38	10	13	15	48	52	−4	43	
17	Nara Club	38	7	18	13	43	56	−13	39	
18	Nagano Parceiro	38	7	16	15	44	57	−13	37	
19	YSCC Yokohama (R)	38	7	11	20	34	64	−30	32	Qualification for the relegation/promotion play-offs
20	Iwate Grulla Morioka (R)	38	5	7	26	27	80	−53	22	Relegation to the 2025 JFL

Source: Meiji Yasuda J3 League, J.League Data Site
Rules for classification: 1) Points; 2) Goal difference; 3) Goals scored; 4) Head-to-head points; 5) Head-to-head goal difference; 6) Head-to-head goal scored; 7) Fair-play points.
(C) Champions; (O) Play-off winners; (P) Promoted; (R) Relegated

==== Japan Football League (JFL) ====
Pos	Team	Pld	W	D	L	GF	GA	GD	Pts	Promotion, qualification or relegation
1	Tochigi City (C, P)	30	19	7	4	66	35	+31	64	Promotion to 2025 J3 League
2	Kochi United (O, P)	30	16	7	7	36	22	+14	55	Qualification for promotion playoffs
3	Tiamo Hirakata	30	15	5	10	49	45	+4	50	
4	Reilac Shiga	30	14	6	10	47	32	+15	48	
5	Veertien Mie	30	13	9	8	41	33	+8	48	
6	Verspah Oita	30	11	12	7	37	37	0	45	
7	Honda FC	30	11	10	9	34	27	+7	43	
8	Briobecca Urayasu	30	12	6	12	39	36	+3	42	
9	Okinawa SV	30	11	8	11	52	44	+8	41	
10	ReinMeer Aomori	30	9	14	7	32	26	+6	41	
11	Atletico Suzuka	30	10	7	13	39	42	−3	37	
12	Sony Sendai	30	10	7	13	34	40	−6	37	Disbanded after the season
13	Maruyasu Okazaki	30	6	12	12	30	39	−9	30	
14	Criacao Shinjuku	30	5	11	14	19	44	−25	26	
15	Yokogawa Musashino	30	5	8	17	26	56	−30	23	
16	Minebea Mitsumi (O)	30	5	7	18	25	48	−23	22	Qualification for relegation playoffs

Source: Japan Football League Soccerway
Rules for classification: 1) Points; 2) Goal difference; 3) Goals scored; 4) Head-to-head points; 5) Head-to-head goal difference; 6) Head-to-head goal scored; 7) Fair-play points.
(C) Champions; (O) Play-off winners; (P) Promoted

==== Regional Leagues ====
===== JRFCL Final Round =====
Pos	Team	Pld	W	D	L	GF	GA	GD	Pts	Promotion
1	Asuka FC (P)	3	2	0	1	4	5	−1	6	Promoted to the JFL
2	Vonds Ichihara	3	1	1	1	7	5	+2	4	Qualification for JFL promotion/relegation play-off
3	Fukui United	3	1	1	1	9	9	0	4	
4	J-Lease	3	0	2	1	4	5	−1	2	

Updated to match(es) played on 24 November 2024. Source: JFA
(P) Promoted

=== League (women) ===
==== Promotion and relegation ====
League	Promoted to league	Relegated from league
WE League		
Nadeshiko League Division 1		
Nadeshiko League Division 2		

==== WE League ====
Pos	Team	Pld	W	D	L	GF	GA	GD	Pts	Qualification
1	Urawa Red Diamonds (C)	22	18	3	1	55	17	+38	57	Qualification to the 2024–25 AFC Women's Champions League
2	INAC Kobe Leonessa	22	15	4	3	39	12	+27	49	
3	Nippon TV Tokyo Verdy Beleza	22	13	7	2	47	18	+29	46	
4	Albirex Niigata	22	13	2	7	26	18	+8	41	
5	Sanfrecce Hiroshima Regina	22	9	4	9	26	25	+1	31	
6	JEF United Chiba	22	6	7	9	18	23	−5	25	
7	Omiya Ardija Ventus	22	7	4	11	17	32	−15	25	
8	Chifure AS Elfen Saitama	22	7	2	13	20	29	−9	23	
9	Cerezo Osaka Yanmar	22	6	3	13	19	31	−12	21	
10	MyNavi Sendai	22	5	6	11	22	40	−18	21	
11	AC Nagano Parceiro	22	4	6	12	21	40	−19	18	
12	Nojima Stella Kanagawa Sagamihara	22	3	4	15	16	41	−25	13	

Source: WE League, WE League Data Site
Rules for classification: 1) Points;2) Goal difference;3) Number of goals scored.
(C) Champions

=== Cup competitions (men) ===
==== Fujifilm Super Cup ====
17 February 2024
13:35 JST

Vissel Kobe	0–1	Kawasaki Frontale
	Report	Van Wermeskerken 48'

Japan National Stadium, Tokyo
Attendance: 52,142
Referee: Akihiko Ikeuchi

=== Cup competitions (women) ===
==== WE League Cup ====
14 October 2023
16:03 JST

Sanfrecce Hiroshima Regina	0–0	Albirex Niigata
	Report (WE League)
Penalties
	4–2

Kawasaki Todoroki Stadium, Kawasaki, Kanagawa
Attendance: 6,261

== See also ==
- Japan Football Association (JFA)
