= Football at the 2026 Central American and Caribbean Games =

- Venue: Estadio Cibao FC; Estadio Olímpico (La Vega); Estadio Complejo Deportivo Moca 85
- Location: Santo Domingo, Dominican Republic
- Dates: 29 July – 7 August

The association football competition at the 2026 Central American and Caribbean Games was held in Santo Domingo, Dominican Republic, from 29 July to 7 August 2026 at Estadio Cibao FC, Estadio Olímpico, and Estadio Complejo Deportivo Moca 85.

== Participating nations ==
The number of athletes a nation entered is in parentheses beside the name of the country.

Men

- Colombia (20)
- Costa Rica (20)
- Cuba (20)
- Dominican Republic (20)
- Guatemala (20)
- Mexico (20)
- Panama (20)
- Venezuela (20)

Women

- Colombia (20)
- Costa Rica (20)
- Dominican Republic (20)
- El Salvador (20)
- Jamaica (20)
- Mexico (20)
- Puerto Rico (20)
- Venezuela (20)

== Medal table ==
* Host nation (Dominican Republic)

Rank	Nation	Gold	Silver	Bronze	Total
1	Mexico (MEX)	1	1	0	2
2	Venezuela (VEN)	1	0	0	1
3	Colombia (COL)	0	1	0	1
4	El Salvador (ESA)	0	0	1	1
4	Panama (PAN)	0	0	1	1
Totals (5 entries)		2	2	2	6

== Medal summary ==
Event	Gold	Silver	Bronze
Men's tournament	Venezuela; Diego Ochoa; Luigi Pagano; Ricardo Rincones; Marcos Maitán; Jhon Mancilla; Sebastián Hernández; Santos Torrealba; Jesús González; Diego Claut; Luis Carrero; Charly Vegas; Erickson Lira; Wilder Wilches; Aytor Herrera; Anthwan Díaz; Juan Uribe; Gustavo Lozano; Aquiles Zamora; Santiago Pita; Henrry Díaz	Mexico; Emmanuel Ochoa; Juan Uribe; Rodrigo Pachuca; Diego Ochoa; Jaziel Mendoza; Bernardo Parra; Rogelio González; Gael García; Tahiel Jiménez; Octavio Vázquez; Joaquín Moxica; Giovanny Camacho; Luis Navarrete; Jonathan Pérez; Sebastián Aceves; Israel Tello; Marco Fava; Jesús Serrato; Mateo Levy; Brandon Téllez	Panama; Lucca Bellina; Abdul Morales; Joshua Pierre; Ángel Díaz; Kevin Quintero; Blás Pérez; Rubén Collymore; Luis Villarreal; Oscar Peñalba; Ryan Gómez; Albert Córdoba; Ian Flores; Kevin Bernal; Miguel Muñoz; Juan Hall; Allan Saldaña; Javier Arboleda; Anel Ryce; Francisco Córdoba; Carlos Sinisterra
Women's tournament	Mexico; Celeste Espino; Alexandra Godínez; Karol Bernal; Tanna Sánchez; Natalia Colin; Ella Sanchez; Lourdes Bosch; Talia Coury; Paola García; Nicole Pérez; Valerie Vargas; Azul Álvarez; Diana Guatemala; Ana Mendoza; Carol Cázares; Fátima Servín; Silvana Flores; Mayalu Rausch; América Frías; Allison Veloz	Colombia; Natalia Giraldo; María Carvajal; Liz Osorio; María Viáfara; Stefanía Perlaza; Melissa Moreno; Mariana Zamorano; Sara Martínez; Ingrid Guerra; Ana Mile González; Melanin Aponzá; Jimena Ospina; María Baldonvino; Michelle Vásquez; Mariana Muñoz; Juana Ortegón; Laura Garavito; Kelly Ibargüen; Angie Salazar; Paula Escobar	El Salvador; Idalia Serrano; Juana Plata; Jasmine Dybala; Sarina Villa; Andrea Amaya; Alejandra Chirino; Makenna Domínguez; Victoria Sánchez; Yoselyn López; Maggie Segovia; Amber Marinero; Amaya González; Ashlin Fuentes; Emely Rubio; Mya Ulloa; Olivia Gómez; Karen Reyes; Natalie Navarro; Christine Duarte; Dariella Argueta
