= Mayalu Rausch =

Mexican footballer (born 2001)

Personal information
- Full name: Mayalu Ann Rausch Tamayo
- Date of birth: 11 April 2001 (age 25)
- Place of birth: Baden-Württemberg, Germany
- Height: 1.67 m (5 ft 6 in)
- Position: Forward

Team information
- Current team: León
- Number: 16

Youth career
- 2015–2018: 1899 Hoffenheim

Senior career*
Years	Team	Apps	(Gls)
2018–2021	1899 Hoffenheim II	47	(2)
2022–	León	118	(14)

International career
2025–	Mexico U23		
Medal record
Women's football
Representing Mexico
Central American and Caribbean Games
Gold medal – first place	2026 Santo Domingo	Team
- * Club domestic league appearances and goals as of 9 February 2026

Mayalu Ann Rausch Tamayo (born 11 April 2001) is a professional footballer who plays as a Forward for Liga MX Femenil side León. Born and raised in Germany, she represents Mexico internationally.

== Career ==
Rausch started her career in 2018 with 1899 Hoffenheim II. Afterwards, she signed for León in 2022.

== International career ==
Since 2025, Rausch has been part of the Mexico U-23 team.

== Honours ==
Mexico U23

- Central American and Caribbean Gold Medal: 2026
