= Talia Coury =

Mexican footballer (born 2005)

Personal information
- Date of birth: 14 December 2005 (age 20)
- Place of birth: Phoenix, Arizona, United States
- Height: 1.73 m (5 ft 8 in)
- Positions: Center-back; defensive midfielder

Team information
- Current team: Tigres UANL
- Number: 13

College career
Years	Team	Apps	(Gls)
2024–2025	Idaho State Bengals	23	(4)

Senior career*
Years	Team	Apps	(Gls)
2026	Minnesota Aurora FC		
2026–	Tigres UANL		

International career^{‡}
2025–	Mexico U23		
Medal record
Women's football
Representing Mexico
Central American and Caribbean Games
Gold medal – first place	2026 Santo Domingo	Team
- * Club domestic league appearances and goals as of 17 December 2024 ‡ National team caps and goals as of 8 April 2023

Natalia Coury (born 14 December 2005) is a professional footballer who plays for Liga Femenil side Tigres UANL. Primarily a center-back, she can also play as a defensive midfielder. Born in the United States, she has played for the Mexico U23 national team.

== College career ==
Coury played college soccer for the Idaho State Bengals women's soccer team in 2018. In 2024 and 2025, she made 23 appearances and scored 4 goals during her stint with the team.

== Club career ==
=== Minnesota Aurora FC (2026) ===
During the 2026 season, Coury played with Minnesota Aurora FC, where her team won the regular season championship and reached the semifinals in the playoffs.

=== Tigres UANL (2026–present) ===
Coury signed her first professional contract with Liga Femenil side Tigres UANL on 6 July 2026.

== International career ==
Coury was called to the Mexico U23 national team for the first time in October 2025, where she played against Denmark and Finland. She was called back to the team five months later.

In 2026, Coury was included with the Mexican U23 squad for the Central American and Caribbean Games, where the team won the gold medal, defeating Colombia in the final.

== Honors ==
Mexico U23

- Central American and Caribbean Gold Medal: 2026
