= Alexandra Godínez =

Mexican footballer (born 2003)

Personal information
- Full name: Alexandra Guadalupe Godínez García
- Date of birth: 16 May 2003 (age 23)
- Place of birth: Zapopan, Jalisco, Mexico
- Height: 1.70 m (5 ft 7 in)
- Position: Left-back

Team information
- Current team: Monterrey
- Number: 5

Senior career*
Years	Team	Apps	(Gls)
2019–2021	Puebla	70	(0)
2021–2023	América	11	(0)
2023–2026	Pachuca	97	(1)
2026–	Monterrey	3	(0)

International career^{‡}
2026–	Mexico U-23	4	(0)
Medal record
Women's football
Representing Mexico
Central American and Caribbean Games
Gold medal – first place	2026 Santo Domingo	Team
- * Club domestic league appearances and goals as of 9 September 2026 ‡ National team caps and goals as of 9 September 2026

Alexandra Guadalupe Godínez García (born 16 May 2003) is a Mexican professional footballer who plays as a Right-back for Liga Femenil side Monterrey. She is the sister of the fellow footballer Damaris Godínez.

== Career ==
In 2019, she started her career in Puebla. In 2021, she was transferred to América. In 2023, she joined to Pachuca.

== Honours ==
Mexico U23

- Central American and Caribbean Gold Medal: 2026
