= Ella Sanchez =

Mexican footballer (born 2005)

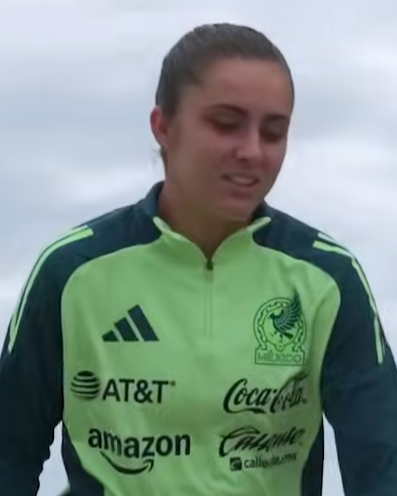
- Sanchez with Mexico in 2025

Personal information
- Full name: Ella Ryan Sanchez Stickel
- Birth name: Ella Ryan Sanchez
- Date of birth: 8 March 2005 (age 21)
- Place of birth: Ohio, U.S.
- Height: 1.65 m (5 ft 5 in)
- Position: Attacking midfielder

Team information
- Current team: Pachuca
- Number: 16

Youth career
- Racing Louisville

Senior career*
| Years | Team | Apps | (Gls) |
| 2022–2023 | Racing Louisville (USL W) | 16 | (4) |
| 2023– | Pachuca | 49 | (3) |
| 2026 | → FC Juárez (loan) | 19 | (2) |

International career^{‡}
| 2022 | United States U-17 | 7 | (0) |
| 2025– | Mexico | 1 | (0) |
Medal record
Women's football
Representing Mexico
Central American and Caribbean Games
| Gold medal – first place | 2026 Santo Domingo | Team |
- * Club domestic league appearances and goals as of 6 January 2026 ‡ National team caps and goals as of 3 June 2025

Ella Ryan Sanchez Stickel (born 8 March 2005) is a professional footballer who plays as an attacking midfielder for Liga Femenil club Pachuca. Born in the United States, she plays for the Mexico national team. She signed with Pachuca out of the Racing Louisville Academy at age 18 in 2023.

Sanchez represented the United States at youth level, appearing at the 2022 FIFA U-17 Women's World Cup. In 2025, she changed her allegiance to Mexico and debuted for them at senior level.

== Early life ==
Sanchez grew up in Louisville, Kentucky, and attended Ballard High School. She played high school soccer for three seasons, setting the school scoring record with 144 goals and 60 assists, and earned first-team all-state recognition twice. She was named the Kentucky Gatorade Player of the Year after her junior season, having scored 64 goals and led Ballard to the regional semifinals. She played club soccer for the Racing Louisville Academy (while her father was the director of the academy), being named ECNL All-American in 2021. Later that year, she dressed as a first-team player for Racing Louisville in the Women's Cup exhibition championship game against Bayern Munich. She later also played for Racing's USL W League side.

== Club career ==
On July 3, 2023, it was announced that Sanchez had signed her first professional contract with Mexican club Pachuca. She made her professional debut on July 24, coming on as a second-half substitute for Nina Nicosia in a 2–0 loss to Cruz Azul. However, she played primarily for the under-19 side during her first year and a half in Pachuca, making 24 appearances and scoring 2 goals. On November 3, she made her first start for the senior team in her fifth appearance, but was sent off after a foul against Daniela Delgado as Las Tuzas lost 3–0 to Guadalajara. On March 25, 2024, she scored her first Liga Femenil goal to conclude a 4–0 victory over Santos Laguna at the Estadio Hidalgo.

Sanchez became a first-team regular at the start of the Clausura 2025. On January 26, 2025, she scored her first goal of the season, opening a 5–0 win over Atlético San Luis. She ended the Clausura by coming off the bench in both legs of the final, helping Pachuca win 3–2 on aggregate against Club América to secure their first Liga Femenil championship. Later that year, on August 19, Sanchez and Pachuca made their CONCACAF W Champions Cup debut and won the match 6–0 against Panamanian club Chorrillo.

On December 23, 2025, Sanchez joined FC Juárez on loan for the Clausura 2026. On January 6, 2026, she made a goalscoring debut for Las Bravas in a 3–2 loss to Mazatlán. She finished the loan with 2 goals in 19 appearances.

== International career ==
Sanchez holds United States and Mexican citizenship. She was called into virtual training camp with the United States under-17 team in February 2021. The following year, she was selected to the roster for the 2022 FIFA U-17 Women's World Cup in India. She appeared in three games and started in the team's quarterfinal match again Nigeria, where they lost on penalties. She was invited to train with the combined under-18/under-19 team in April 2023.

Sanchez was called into the inaugural training camp of the Mexico under-23 team in March–April 2025. She received her first senior call-up with Mexico in May. She made her international debut for Mexico on June 3, 2025, starting in a 1–0 friendly win against Uruguay.

In 2026, Sanchez was included with the Mexican squad for the Central American and Caribbean Games, where the team won the gold medal, defeating Colombia in the final.

== Personal life ==
Sanchez the second oldest of four children born to Shana (née Stickel) and Mario Sanchez. Her father played professional soccer before becoming a soccer coach, and her mother played college soccer at Cal Poly. Her older brother, Sebastian, turned professional with Louisville City.

== Honors ==
Pachuca

- Liga Femenil: Clausura 2025
- Campeón de Campeonas: 2025

Mexico U23

- Central American and Caribbean Gold Medal: 2026
