= Abigail Byrne =

English football referee

- Born: 19 April 1992 (age 34); Bury St Edmunds, Suffolk, England
- Other occupation: Credit control

Domestic
Years	League	Role
2016–2019	National League	Assistant referee
2016-2022	Isthmian League	Referee
2017-	Women's Super League	Referee
2022-	National League	Referee
2024-	English Football League	Referee

International
Years	League	Role
2019–	FIFA listed	Referee

Abigail Byrne (born 19 April 1992) is an English professional football referee from Suffolk working for Professional Game Match Officials Limited. Since 2016, she has officiated primarily in the Women's Super League, as well as for FIFA and UEFA as a FIFA international referee since 2019.

She also officiates in men's professional football on the English Football League and National League.

== Domestic refereeing career ==
Byrne has been a qualified referee with Suffolk County Football Association since 2011 and was trained by their Referees Academy based at Ipswich Town F.C. She refereed many of her early games on the Bury & District Sunday League. She is a member of the Bury St Edmunds Referees Association and is dual registered with Cambridgeshire County Football Association.

She was promoted as a referee through the National League System via the Eastern Counties Football League between 2015 and 2016, followed by the Isthmian League between 2016 and 2022, where she was voted Referee of the Year in 2019, and onto the National League in 2022.

Byrne has achieved success domestically in the women's game, officiating in 5 Women's FA Cup Finals at Wembley Stadium; 2019& 2024 as referee, 2017 as Assistant referee and 2020 & 2023 as Fourth Official. She also took charge of the 2021 FA Women's League Cup final at Vicarage Road.

She was the first female referee to take charge of Soccer Aid, in the 2023 edition at Old Trafford. Usain Bolt and Jill Scott were the respective captains.

She also became only the third female referee to be appointed to referee a match in the English Football League when she refereed AFC Wimbledon vs Swindon Town F.C. in League 2 on 26 December 2024.

== International Refereeing career ==
Byrne was promoted to the UEFA Category 1 Referees List for 2022.

She was selected to referee at the 2023 UEFA Women's Under-19 Championship in Belgium where she refereed 2 matches.

She went to the 2024 Sud Ladies Cup in Avignon, France for International teams preparing for the 2024 FIFA U-20 Women's World Cup. She refereed 3 matches including the final between France and Mexico.

In October 2024, she was selected to represent UEFA at the 2024 FIFA U-17 Women's World Cup in Dominican Republic where she refereed 3 matches, including the opening game between Dominican Republic and Ecuador, and the quarter final between North Korea and Poland. This tournament was used as a trial for Football video support as an alternative to VAR (Video assistant referee).

== Personal life ==
Byrne was educated at Mildenhall College Academy in Mildenhall, Suffolk in the same year group as English international Cricketer Tymal Mills.

Her brother is Adam Marriott, a Professional Footballer who played for Cambridge United F.C., Stevenage F.C., Lincoln City F.C. and Boston United F.C.

She got married in 2017 to George Byrne, a Select Group 2 Assistant referee operating in the EFL Championship.
