= Tanna Sánchez =

Mexican footballer (born 2001)

Personal information
- Full name: Tanna Sánchez Carreto
- Date of birth: 21 December 2001 (age 24)
- Place of birth: Puebla City, Puebla, Mexico
- Height: 1.68 m (5 ft 6 in)
- Position: Centre-back

Team information
- Current team: Cruz Azul
- Number: 4

College career
Years	Team	Apps	(Gls)
2020–2023	Alabama Crimson Tide	55	(3)

Senior career*
Years	Team	Apps	(Gls)
2024–2026	Monterrey	53	(3)
2026–	Cruz Azul	0	(0)

International career^{‡}
2017–2018	Mexico U17		
2019–2020	Mexico U20		
Medal record
Women's football
Representing Mexico
Central American and Caribbean Games
Gold medal – first place	2026 Santo Domingo	Team
- * Club domestic league appearances and goals as of 1 February 2026 ‡ National team caps and goals as of 23 February 2021

Tanna Sánchez Carreto (born 21 December 2001) is a Mexican footballer who plays as a centre-back for Liga Femenil club Cruz Azul.

== College career ==
Sánchez has attended the University of Alabama in Tuscaloosa.

== Club career ==
In 2024, she started her career in Monterrey.

== International career ==
Sánchez was member of the squad that played the Mexico women's national under-17 football team at the 2018 FIFA U-17 Women's World Cup.

In 2026, Sánchez was included with the Mexican squad for the Central American and Caribbean Games, where the team won the gold medal, defeating Colombia in the final.

== Honours ==
Mexico U23

- Central American and Caribbean Gold Medal: 2026
