= Allison Veloz =

American soccer player (born 2001)

Personal information
- Full name: Allison Rose Veloz
- Date of birth: January 9, 2001 (age 25)
- Place of birth: Corona, California, U.S.
- Position: Forward

Team information
- Current team: Pachuca
- Number: 11

Youth career
- Willow Canyon High School

College career
Years	Team	Apps	(Gls)
2020–2021	Long Beach City College		
2022–2023	Northern Arizona University	38	(11)

Senior career*
Years	Team	Apps	(Gls)
2024–2025	Necaxa	33	(7)
2025–2026	Monterrey	18	(2)
2026–	Pachuca	0	(0)
Medal record
Women's football
Representing Mexico
Central American and Caribbean Games
Gold medal – first place	2026 Santo Domingo	Team
- * Club domestic league appearances and goals as of February 2, 2026

Allison Rose Veloz (born January 9, 2001) is a professional football player who plays as a forward for Liga Femenil club Pachuca. Born in the US, Veloz represents Mexico internationally.

== Early life and education ==
Allison Veloz was born in Corona, California, and attended Willow Canyon High School in Surprise, Arizona. While at Willow Canyon, Veloz excelled in both soccer and track and field. She set multiple school soccer records, including most goals and points scored in a single game, season, and career. In track and field, she was an Arizona state champion in the heptathlon and set the school record in the javelin throw.

== College career ==
Veloz began her collegiate soccer career at Long Beach City College from 2020 to 2021. There, she earned conference player of the year honors and set school records for most goals scored in a season.

In 2022, she transferred to Northern Arizona University to play for the Northern Arizona Lumberjacks. Over her two seasons at NAU, she played 38 games, scoring 11 goals and providing three assists. In her senior year, she led the team with seven goals and four game-winning goals, earning a spot on the Big Sky First Team All-Conference and Big Sky All-Tournament Team.

== Club career ==
In July 2024, Veloz signed her first professional contract with Necaxa in Liga MX Femenil. She quickly made an impact, scoring her first professional goal in a 1–0 victory over Santos Laguna. Her contributions helped Necaxa secure their first victory of the Apertura 2024 season.

== International career ==
In 2026, Veloz was included with the Mexican squad for the Central American and Caribbean Games, where the team won the gold medal, defeating Colombia in the final.

== Personal life ==
Veloz is the daughter of Melissa Lindley and Ruben Veloz. She has an older brother, Evan, and a younger sister, Willow. She chose to attend Northern Arizona University because of its positive environment and strong team support.

== Honors ==
Mexico U23

- Central American and Caribbean Gold Medal: 2026
