= Paola García (footballer) =

Mexican footballer (born 2004)

Personal information
- Full name: Marcia Paola García Ramírez
- Date of birth: 29 March 2004 (age 22)
- Place of birth: Guadalajara, Jalisco, Mexico
- Height: 1.65 m (5 ft 5 in)
- Position: Forward

Team information
- Current team: Pachuca
- Number: 26

Senior career*
Years	Team	Apps	(Gls)
2020–2025	Atlas	111	(37)
2025–	Pachuca	0	(0)

International career^{‡}
2023–2024	Mexico U-20		
Medal record
Women's football
Representing Mexico
Central American and Caribbean Games
Gold medal – first place	2026 Santo Domingo	Team
- * Club domestic league appearances and goals as of 4 June 2023 ‡ National team caps and goals as of 12 March 2022

Marcia Paola García Ramírez (born 29 September 2004) is a Mexican professional footballer who plays as a Forward for Liga Femenil side Pachuca.

== Career ==
In 2020, she started her career in Atlas.

== International career ==
Since 2023, García has been part of the Mexico U-20 team.

== Honours ==
Guadalajara

- Liga MX Femenil: Clausura 2022

Mexico U23

- Central American and Caribbean Gold Medal: 2026
