= Carol Cázares =

Mexican footballer (born 2003)

Personal information
- Full name: Carol Cázares Carrera
- Date of birth: 14 June 2003 (age 23)
- Place of birth: San Pedro Garza García, Nuevo León, Mexico
- Height: 1.77 m (5 ft 10 in)
- Position: Centre-back

Team information
- Current team: Monterrey
- Number: 33

College career
| Years | Team | Apps | (Gls) |
| 2020–2021 | Montverde Academy | | |

Senior career*
| Years | Team | Apps | (Gls) |
| 2021–2022 | UANL | 2 | (0) |
| 2023–2024 | FC Viktoria 1889 Berlin | | |
| 2024– | Monterrey | 24 | (3) |

International career^{‡}
| 2022 | Mexico U-20 | | |
Medal record
Women's football
Representing Mexico
Central American and Caribbean Games
| Gold medal – first place | 2026 Santo Domingo | Team |
- * Club domestic league appearances and goals as of 1 February 2026 ‡ National team caps and goals as of 14 July 2023

Carol Cázares Carrera (born 14 June 2003) is a Mexican professional footballer who plays as a centre-back for Liga MX Femenil side Monterrey.

== Career ==
Cázares started her career in 2021 with UANL. In 2023, she was transferred to FC Viktoria 1889 Berlin. Since 2024, she is part of Monterrey.

== International career ==
Cazares was also part of the team that participated in the 2022 FIFA U-20 Women's World Cup in Costa Rica.

== Honours ==
Mexico U23

- Central American and Caribbean Gold Medal: 2026
