= Daniela Delgado =

Mexican footballer (born 2002)

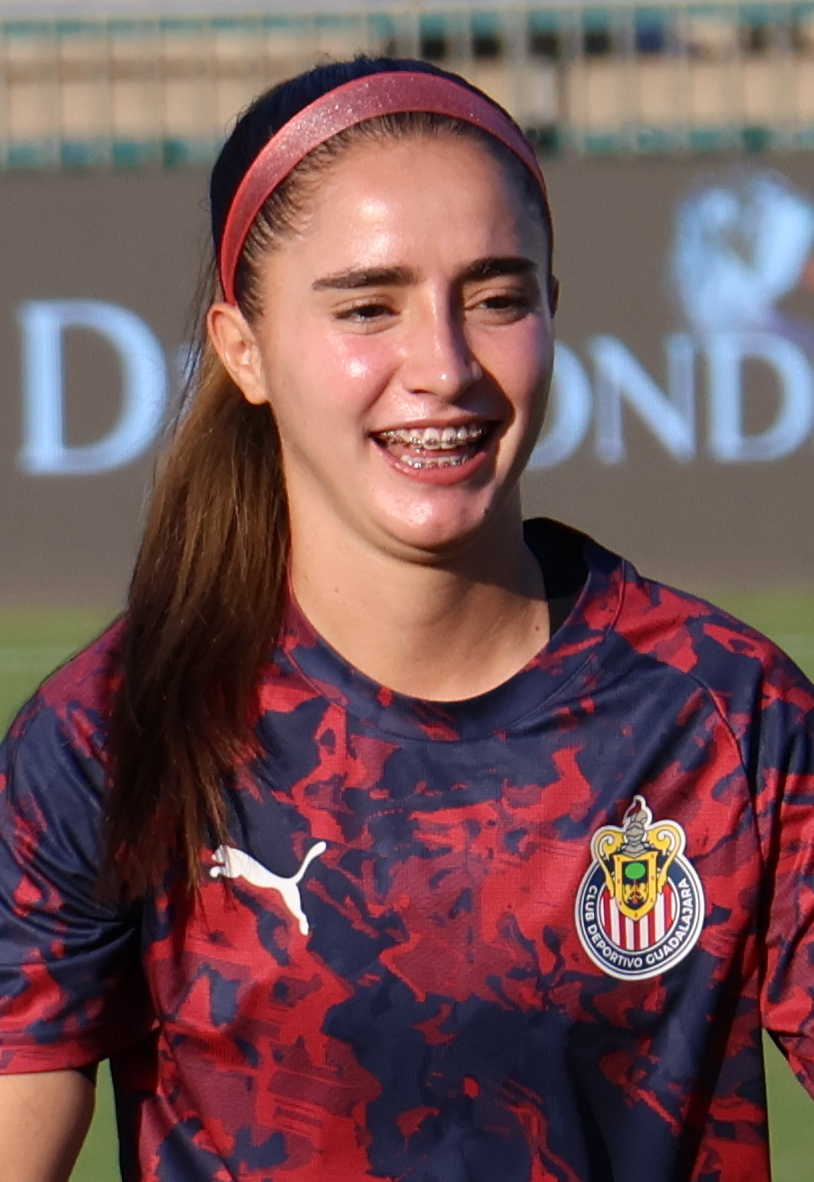
- Delgado with Guadalajara in 2025

Personal information
- Full name: Daniela Delgado Félix
- Date of birth: 27 September 2002 (age 24)
- Place of birth: Durango, Mexico
- Height: 1.63 m (5 ft 4 in)
- Position: Midfielder

Team information
- Current team: Atlético San Luis (on loan from Guadalajara)
- Number: 33

Senior career*
Years	Team	Apps	(Gls)
2017–2023	Santos Laguna	151	(8)
2023–	Guadalajara	62	(0)
2026–	→ Atlético San Luis (loan)	0	(0)

International career
2021–2022	Mexico U20		
- * Club domestic league appearances and goals as of 1 February 2026

Daniela Delgado Félix (born 27 September 2002) is a Mexican professional footballer who plays as midfielder for Liga MX Femenil club Atlético San Luis.

== Club career ==
Delgado began playing for Santos Laguna during the closing season of Liga MX Femenil. In 2023 she was transferred to Guadalajara.

== International career ==
Delgado also played for the Mexico women's national under-20 football team and was selected for the 2022 FIFA U-20 Women's World Cup.
