= Natalia Colin =

Mexican footballer (born 2005)

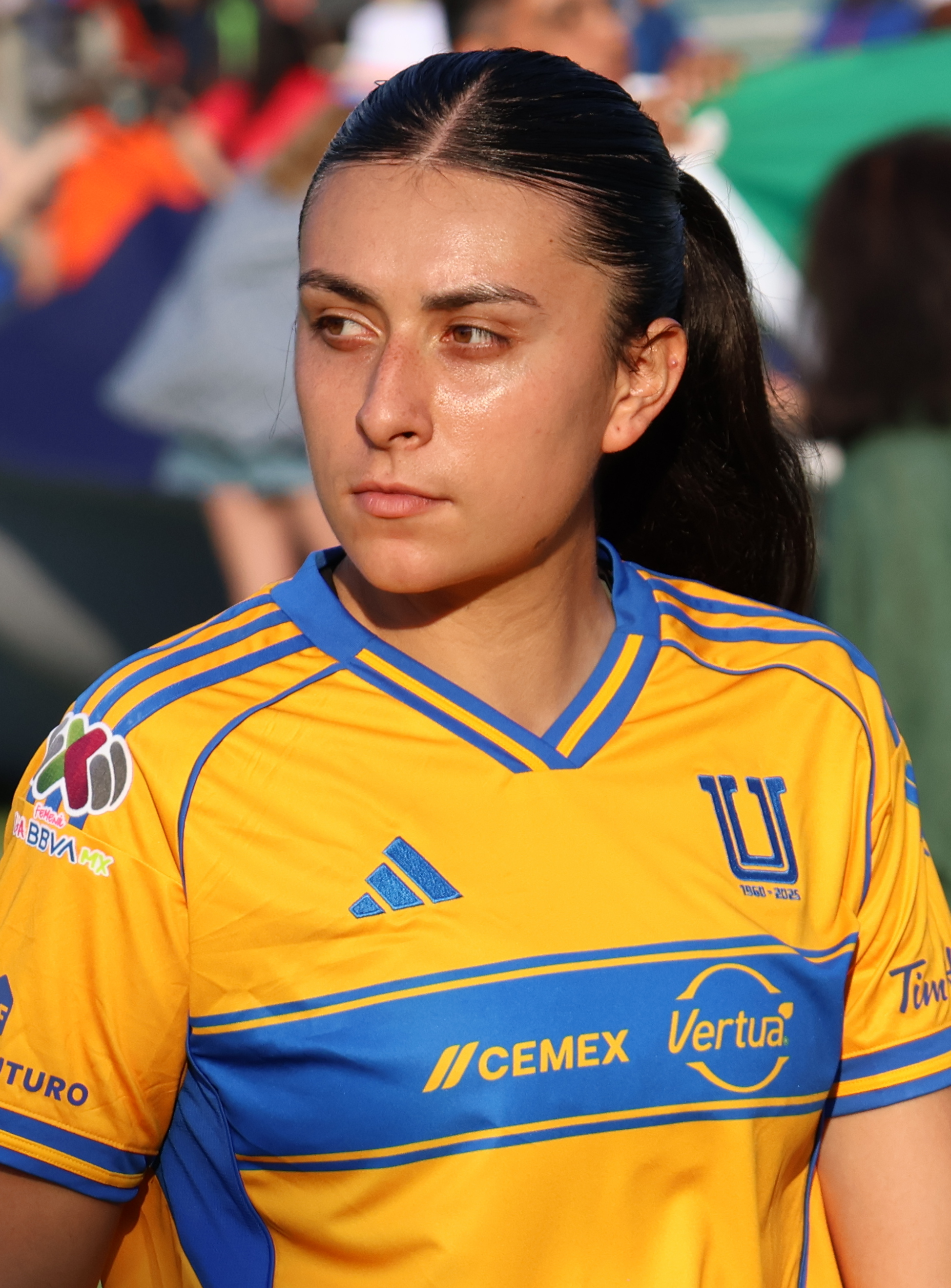
- Colin with Tigres UANL in 2025

Personal information
- Full name: Natalia Judith Colin Ruiz
- Date of birth: 17 May 2005 (age 21)
- Place of birth: Chicago, Illinois, United States
- Height: 1.73 m (5 ft 8 in)
- Position: Centre-back

Team information
- Current team: Guadalajara
- Number: 4

Senior career*
Years	Team	Apps	(Gls)
2021–2024	Toluca	72	(5)
2024–	UANL	38	(3)
2026–	→ Guadalajara (loan)	7	(0)

International career
2023–2024	Mexico U20		
2025–	Mexico U23		
2025–	Mexico	2	(0)
Medal record
Women's football
Representing Mexico
Central American and Caribbean Games
Gold medal – first place	2026 Santo Domingo	Team
- * Club domestic league appearances and goals as of 7 October 2026

Natalia Judith Colin Ruiz (born 17 May 2005) is a professional footballer who plays as a centre-back for Liga MX Femenil club Guadalajara, on loan from Tigres UANL. Born and raised in the United States, she represents Mexico internationally.

== Career ==
Colin started her career in 2021 with Toluca. Afterwards, she signed for UANL in 2023.

== International career ==
From 2023 to 2024, Colin was a part of the Mexico U-20 team.

== Honours ==
UANL

- Liga MX Femenil: Apertura 2025

Mexico U-20

- CONCACAF Women's U-20 Championship: 2023

Mexico U23

- Central American and Caribbean Gold Medal: 2026
