= Fátima Servín =

Mexican footballer (born 2005)

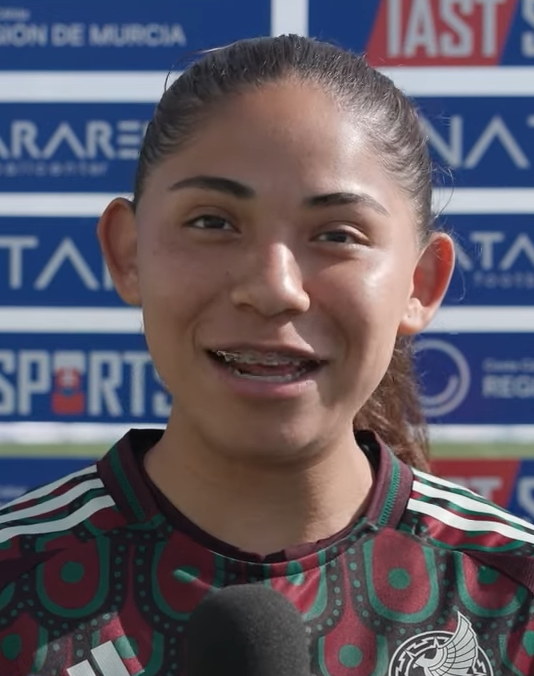
- Servín with Mexico in 2025

Personal information
- Full name: Fátima Servín Sánchez
- Date of birth: 17 May 2005 (age 21)
- Place of birth: Querétaro City, Querétaro, Mexico
- Height: 1.67 m (5 ft 6 in)
- Position: Attacking midfielder

Team information
- Current team: Monterrey
- Number: 27

Senior career*
Years	Team	Apps	(Gls)
2019–2022	Querétaro	77	(6)
2022–	Monterrey	75	(6)

International career^{‡}
2022	Mexico U-17		
2023–	Mexico U-20		
2024–	Mexico	4	(1)
Medal record
Women's football
Representing Mexico
Central American and Caribbean Games
Gold medal – first place	2026 Santo Domingo	Team
- * Club domestic league appearances and goals as of 1 February 2026 ‡ National team caps and goals as of 20 February 2025

Fátima Servín Sánchez (born 17 May 2005) is a Mexican professional footballer who plays as an attacking midfielder for Liga MX Femenil club Monterrey and the Mexico national team.

== Club career ==
Servín started her career in 2019 with Querétaro. Afterwards, she signed for Monterrey in 2022.

== International career ==
Servín has been part of the Mexico women's national football team program since the U-17 level. She was part of the Mexico U-17 team that participated on the 2022 CONCACAF Women's U-17 Championship and 2022 FIFA U-17 Women's World Cup.

Since 2023, Servín has been part of the Mexico U-20 team. She scored the deciding goal in the 88th minute of the 2023 CONCACAF Women's U-20 Championship final, defeating the United States 2–1.

== Career statistics ==
No.	Date	Venue	Opponent	Score	Result	Competition
1.	19 February 2025	Pinatar Arena, San Pedro del Pinatar, Spain	Chinese Taipei	2–0	4–0	2025 Pinatar Cup

== Honours ==
Mexico U20

- CONCACAF Women's U-20 Championship: 2023

Mexico U23

- Central American and Caribbean Gold Medal: 2026
