= América Frías =

Mexican footballer (born 2004)

Personal information
- Full name: Andrea América Frías
- Date of birth: 19 January 2004 (age 22)
- Place of birth: Los Angeles, California, United States
- Height: 1.75 m (5 ft 9 in)
- Position: Attacking midfielder

Team information
- Current team: Cruz Azul
- Number: 5

College career
Years	Team	Apps	(Gls)
2022–2025	UCLA Bruins	60	(1)

Senior career*
Years	Team	Apps	(Gls)
2026–	Cruz Azul	4	(0)

International career
2022–2024	Mexico U20		
Medal record
Women's football
Representing Mexico
Central American and Caribbean Games
Gold medal – first place	2026 Santo Domingo	Team
- * Club domestic league appearances and goals as of 1 February 2026

Andrea América Frías (born 19 January 2004) is a professional footballer who plays as a attacking midfielder for Liga Femenil club Cruz Azul. Born and raised in the United States, she represents Mexico internationally.

== Career ==
Frías started her career in 2026 with Cruz Azul.

== International career ==
From 2023 to 2024, Frías was a part of the Mexico U-20 team.

In 2026, Frías was included with the Mexican squad for the Central American and Caribbean Games, where the team won the gold medal, defeating Colombia in the final.

== Honours ==
Guadalajara

Mexico U23

- Central American and Caribbean Gold Medal: 2026
