= Celeste Espino =

Mexican footballer (born 2003)

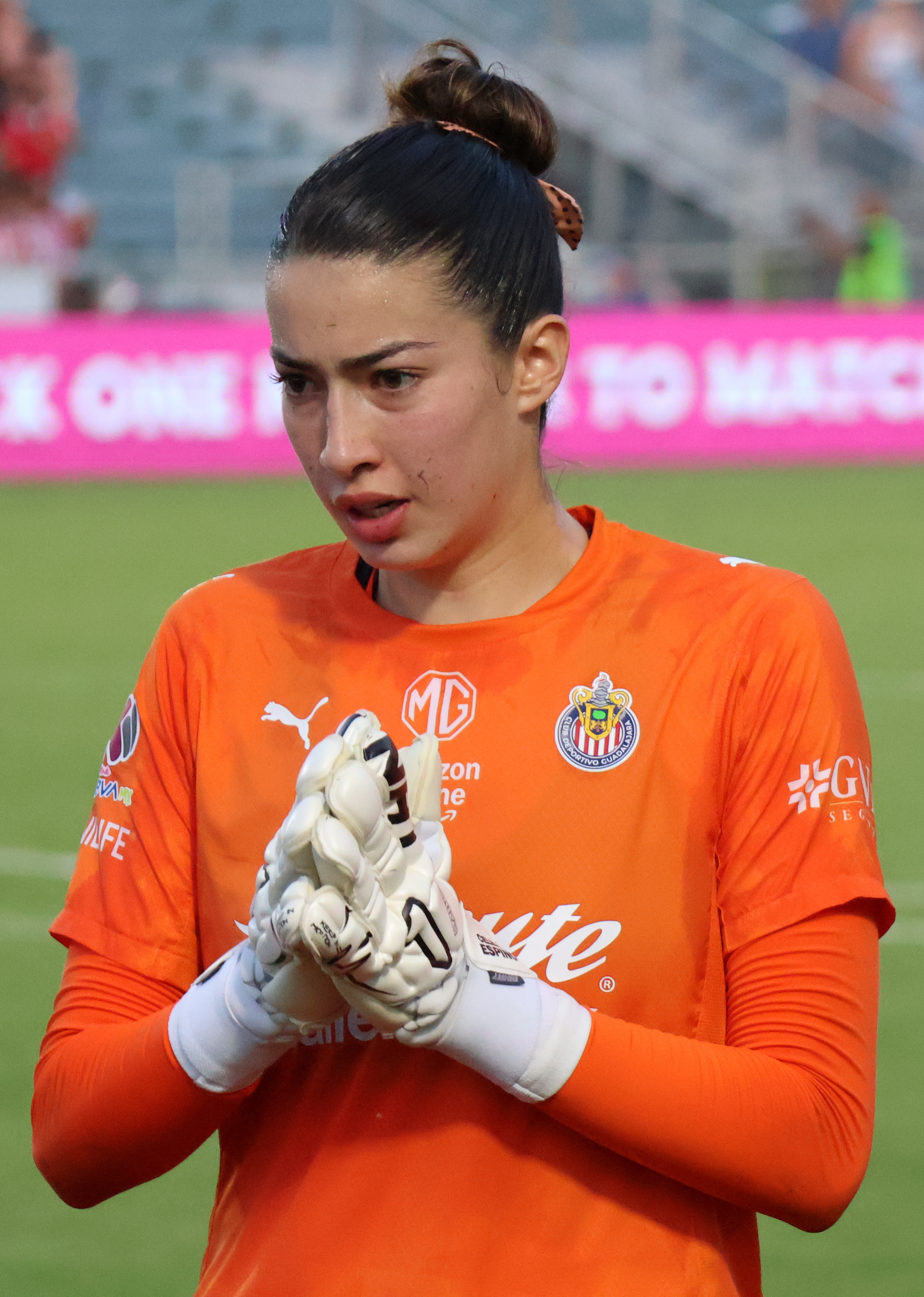
- Espino with Guadalajara in 2025

Personal information
- Full name: Celeste Maryel Espino Mendoza
- Date of birth: 9 August 2003 (age 23)
- Place of birth: Zapopan, Jalisco, Mexico
- Height: 1.76 m (5 ft 9 in)
- Position: Goalkeeper

Team information
- Current team: América
- Number: 1

Senior career*
Years	Team	Apps	(Gls)
2019–2026	Guadalajara	74	(0)
2026–	América	0	(0)

International career^{‡}
2021–2022	Mexico U20	9	(0)
2024–	Mexico	5	(0)
Medal record
Women's football
Representing Mexico
Central American and Caribbean Games
Gold medal – first place	2026 Santo Domingo	Team
- * Club domestic league appearances and goals as of 14 June 2026 ‡ National team caps and goals as of 14 June 2026

Celeste Maryel Espino Mendoza (born 9 August 2003) is a Mexican professional footballer who plays as a goalkeeper for Liga Femenil side Club América and the Mexico women's national football team.

== Playing career ==
=== Guadalajara (2019–2026) ===
Espino is a product of Guadalajara youth academy. She was promoted to the senior team in 2019. While mostly used as back-up keeper, starting in 2021, Espino began to play an important role at Chivas, including by helping the team win its second league title during the Clausura 2022 tournament.

On 23 March 2023, Chivas announced that Espino had suffered an ACL injury during a training session, which left her out of action for nearly a year. She returned to play on 4 March 2024, during a league match against Necaxa.

On 13 June 2026, Chivas announced that Espino was departing the club after declining to extend her contract. She played a total of 74 league games during her time at Chivas.

=== Club America (2026-present) ===
after multiple rumors pointed towards Espino suprisinglly joining Chivas’ main rival, Club América, the Mexico City side finally made her signing official on 1 July 2026.

== International career ==
=== Youth ===
Espino played for the Mexico women's national under-20 football team during the 2022 CONCACAF Women's U-20 Championship, in which she was part of the starting line-up in five out of the seven games that Mexico played in the competition. Espino was also selected for the 2022 FIFA U-20 Women's World Cup, in which she initiated every match that Mexico played in that tournament.

=== Senior ===
Espino made her official debut with the senior Mexico women's national football team on 1 June 2024, in a friendly match against Canada in which she was part of the starting lineup. The match ended in 2–0 defeat for Mexico.

== Honours ==
Guadalajara

- Liga MX Femenil: Clausura 2022

Mexico U23

- Central American and Caribbean Games, gold medal, Santo Domingo 2026.
