= Karol Bernal =

Mexican footballer (born 2003)

Personal information
- Full name: Karol Esthefany Bernal Castañeda
- Date of birth: 2 February 2003 (age 23)
- Place of birth: Durango, Durango, Mexico
- Height: 1.67 m (5 ft 6 in)
- Positions: Centre-back; left-back

Team information
- Current team: América
- Number: 4

Senior career*
Years	Team	Apps	(Gls)
2018–2026	C.F. Monterrey	128	(4)
2021–2022	→ C.D. Guadalajara (loan)	48	(1)
2026–	América	0	(0)

International career^{‡}
2023–	Mexico	6	(0)
Medal record
Women's football
Representing Mexico
Central American and Caribbean Games
Gold medal – first place	2026 Santo Domingo	Team
- * Club domestic league appearances and goals as of 8 July 2026 ‡ National team caps and goals as of 2 March 2025

Karol Esthefany Bernal Castañeda (born 2 February 2003) is a Mexican professional footballer who plays as a center-back or left-back for Liga MX Femenil side Club América and the Mexico women's national football team. She has won the Liga MX Femenil with club C.F. Monterrey three times and one time with Liga MX Femenil club C.D. Guadalajara during her professional career.

== Club career ==
=== Monterrey (2018–2026) ===
Bernal signed her first professional contract with Monterrey in 2018 at the age of 15. She made her professional debut with Monterrey on 19 August 2018 on a league match against Querétaro.

==== Loan to C.D. Guadalajara (2021–2022) ====
Bernal left Monterrey on a two-year loan to Chivas with no option to buy ahead of the Clausura 2021 tournament, as part of the transaction to transfer Andrea Sánchez from Chivas to Monterrey. With Chivas, Bernal made 48 appearances and scored one goal, helping the team win the Clausura 2022 league title and the 2022 Campeón de Campeonas championship.

On 25 November 2022, Monterrey announced that Bernal was returning to the club after her loan with Chivas ended.

==== Return to Monterrey and breakthrough (2023–2026) ====
After her return to Monterrey, Bernal immediately became a regular starter for Monterrey. Although her team was unable to win any championship in 2023, Bernal's performances allowed her to be called to the Mexico women's national football team. In 2024, Monterrey was able to win back-to-back league championships, with Bernal being a key figured in the team's defense. Even though Bernal was for the most part consistent in 2025, Monterrey had a disappointing campaign during that year. During the Clausura 2026 tournament, Monterrey returned to the spotlight under head-coach Amandine Miquel, reaching the final of the tournament but Bernal became mostly relegated to the bench due to injuries and technical decisions.

On 18 June 2026, Monterrey announced that after eight years, Bernal was leaving the club after her contract with the team concluded.

=== Club América (2026–present) ===
On 1 July 2026, Club América announced that Bernal was joining the club after her departure from Monterrey.

== International career ==
Bernal has been part of the Mexico women's national team program since the U-15 level, having making appearances with the U-17 and U-20 national teams as well.

Bernal was called to the senior Mexico women's national football team for the first time In February 2023 as part of the Mexico squad for the 2023 Women's Revelations Cup. She made her debut with the senior national team coming as substitution on the first match of the 2023 Women's Revelations Cup against Nigeria.

== Honours ==
Monterrey

- Liga MX Femenil: Apertura 2019, Clausura 2024, Apertura 2024

Guadalajara

- Liga MX Femenil: Clausura 2022
- Campeón de Campeones: 2022

Mexico U23

- Central American and Caribbean Games, gold medal Santo Domingo 2026.
