= Ana Mendoza (footballer) =

Mexican footballer (born 2005)

Personal information
- Full name: Ana Mendoza González
- Date of birth: 7 August 2005 (age 21)
- Place of birth: Tepotzotlán, State of Mexico, Mexico
- Height: 1.67 m (5 ft 6 in)
- Position: Centre-back

Team information
- Current team: UNAM
- Number: 3

Youth career
- 2021–2022: UNAM

Senior career*
Years	Team	Apps	(Gls)
2022–	UNAM	115	(6)

International career
2022	Mexico U-17	3	(0)
2023–2024	Mexico U-20	9	(0)
2024–	Mexico	1	(0)
Medal record
Women's football
Representing Mexico
Central American and Caribbean Games
Gold medal – first place	2026 Santo Domingo	Team
- * Club domestic league appearances and goals as of 31 January 2026

Ana Mendoza González (born 7 August 2005) is a Mexican professional footballer who plays as a centre-back for Liga MX Femenil side UNAM and the Mexico women's national football team.

== Club career ==
=== UNAM (2021–2022 ===
Mendoza is a product of Club Universidad Nacional (also known as Pumas or UNAM) youth academy, having been part of Pumas's U-17 and U-18 teams from 2021 to 2022, and winning the Liga MX Femenil U-18 Apertura 2022 championship with the U-18 side.

Mendoza professional debut with Pumas came at the age of 17 and while she was still part of the U-18 side, when she called for a 15 August 2022 league match against Santos Laguna as part of the Apertura 2022 tournament, in which she was part of the starting line-up. Mendoza played a total of 3 games with Pumas' first-team during the Apertura 2022 before being promoted full-time to the first-team ahead of the Clausura 2023 tournament.

== International career ==
Mendoza was part of the Mexico U-17 side that participated at the 2022 FIFA U-17 Women's World Cup, being part of the starting lineup in all three group-stage games that Mexico played. She was also part of the Mexico U-20 team that won 2023 CONCACAF Women's U-20 Championship and that participated at the 2024 FIFA U-20 Women's World Cup.

On 18 October 2024, Mendoza was named for the first time to the senior Mexico women's national football team by manager Pedro López for friendly matches against Venezuela and Thailand. She subsequently made her debut with the senior national team on 29 October 2024 during the match against Thailand.

== Career statistics ==
=== Club ===
As of match played 17 February 2024

Appearances and goals by club, season and competition
Club	Season	League			Total	
Club	Season	Division	Apps	Goals	Apps	Goals
UNAM	2022–23	Liga MX Femenil	16	0	16	0
UNAM	2023–24	Liga MX Femenil	37	0	37	0
UNAM	2024–25	Liga MX Femenil	21	1	21	1
UNAM	Total		74	1	74	0
Career total			74	1	74	1

== Honours ==
Mexico U-20

- CONCACAF Women's U-20 Championship: 2023

Mexico U23

- Central American and Caribbean Gold Medal: 2026
