= Valerie Vargas =

Mexican footballer (born 2005)

Personal information
- Full name: Valerie Vargas Arceo
- Date of birth: 25 May 2005 (age 21)
- Place of birth: Los Angeles, California, United States
- Height: 1.71 m (5 ft 7 in)
- Position: Attacking midfielder

Team information
- Current team: Monterrey
- Number: 11

College career
Years	Team	Apps	(Gls)
2023–2025	UCLA Bruins	52	(5)

Senior career*
Years	Team	Apps	(Gls)
2026–	Monterrey	4	(0)

International career
2023–2024	Mexico U20		
Medal record
Women's football
Representing Mexico
Central American and Caribbean Games
Gold medal – first place	2026 Santo Domingo	Team
- * Club domestic league appearances and goals as of 1 February 2026

Valerie Vargas Arceo (born 25 May 2005) is a professional footballer who plays as a attacking midfielder for Liga MX Femenil club Monterrey. Born and raised in the United States, she represents Mexico internationally.

== Career ==
Vargas started her career in 2026 with Monterrey.

== International career ==
From 2023 to 2024, Vargas was a part of the Mexico U-20 team.

== Honors ==
Mexico U23

- Central American and Caribbean Gold Medal: 2026
